= Lebanon =

Country in West Asia

Lebanese Republic الجمهورية اللبنانية al-Jumhūriyyah al-Lubnāniyyah
- Flag
- Anthem: كلّنا للوطن; Kullunā li-l-waṭan; "All of us, for our country!"
- Location of Lebanon (in green)

- Capital and largest city: Beirut; 33°54′N 35°32′E
- Official languages: Arabic
- Local vernacular: Lebanese Arabic
- Recognised minority language: French (Note: Article 11 of the Constitution of Lebanon states: "Arabic is the official national language. A law shall determine the cases in which the French language can be used." See French language in Lebanon.)
- Ethnic groups (2021): 95% Arab (Note: The Maronite and Melkite communities are known to oppose being characterized as Arab.); 4% Armenian; 1% others
- Religion (2024): 53.31% Islam; 26.84% Shia; 0.64% Alawite; 26.55% Sunni; 41.40% Christianity; 28.11% Catholic; 8.30% Orthodox; 2.92% Armenian Apostolic; 0.53% Protestant; 1.64% other Christians; 5.21% Druze; 0.08% no religion
- Demonym: Lebanese
- Government: Unitary parliamentary republic under confessionalism
  - President: Joseph Aoun
  - Prime Minister: Nawaf Salam
  - Speaker of the Parliament: Nabih Berri
- Legislature: Parliament

Establishment
  - Emirate of Mount Lebanon: 1516
  - Double Qaim-Maqamate of Mount Lebanon: 1 December 1843
  - Mount Lebanon Mutasarrifate: 9 June 1861
  - Greater Lebanon: 1 September 1920
  - Constitution: 23 May 1926
  - Independence declared: 22 November 1943
  - French mandate ended: 24 October 1945
  - Withdrawal of French forces: 17 April 1946
  - Israeli troops withdrawn: 24 May 2000
  - Syrian troops withdrawn: 30 April 2005

Area
  - Total: 10,452 km^{2} (4,036 sq mi) (161st)
  - Water (%): 1.8

Population
  - 2024 estimate: 5,364,482 (117th)
  - Density: 513/km^{2} (1,328.7/sq mi)
- GDP (PPP): 2022 estimate
  - Total: ▲$78.233 billion (108th)
  - Per capita: ▲$11,793 (114th)
- GDP (nominal): 2022 estimate
  - Total: ▲$21.780 billion (103rd)
  - Per capita: ▲$3,283 (133rd)
- Gini (2011): ▼31.8 medium inequality
- HDI (2023): ▲0.752 high (102nd)
- Currency: Lebanese pound (LBP)
- Time zone: UTC+2 (EET)
  - Summer (DST): UTC+3 (EEST)
- Calling code: +961
- ISO 3166 code: LB
- Internet TLD: .lb; .لبنان

Lebanon, (Note: /ˈlɛbənɒn, -nən/ LEB-ə-non, -nən; Arabic: لُبْنَان, romanized: Lubnān, local pronunciation: [lɪbˈneːn]; French: Liban, pronounced [libɑ̃].) officially the Lebanese Republic, (Note: Arabic: الجمهورية اللبنانية, romanized: al-Jumhūriyyah al-Lubnāniyyah; French: République libanaise, pronounced [ʁe.py.blik li.ba.nɛz]) is a country in the Levant region of West Asia. Situated at the crossroads of the Mediterranean Basin and the Arabian Peninsula, it is bordered by Syria to the north and east, Israel to the south, and the Mediterranean Sea to the west; Cyprus lies a short distance from the coastline. Lebanon has a population of more than five million and an area of 10,452 square kilometres (4,036 sq mi). Beirut is the country's capital and largest city.

Human habitation in Lebanon dates to 5000 BC. From 3200 to 539 BC, it was part of Phoenicia, a maritime civilization that spanned the Mediterranean Basin. In 64 BC, the region became part of the Roman Empire and the subsequent Byzantine Empire. After the seventh century, it came under the rule of different Arab Islamic caliphates, including the Rashidun, Umayyad and Abbasid caliphates. The 11th century saw the establishment of Christian Crusader states, which fell to the Ayyubids and the Mamluks. Lebanon came under Ottoman rule in the early 16th century. Under Ottoman sultan Abdulmejid I, the first Lebanese proto-state, the Mount Lebanon Mutasarrifate, was established as a home for Maronite Christians, as part of the Tanzimat reforms.

After the dissolution of the Ottoman Empire following World War I, Lebanon came under the Mandate for Syria and the Lebanon, administered by France, which established Greater Lebanon. By 1943, Lebanon had gained independence from Free France and established a distinct form of confessional government, with the state's major religious groups being apportioned specific political powers. The new Lebanese state was relatively stable, but this was ultimately shattered by the outbreak of the Lebanese Civil War (1975–1990). Lebanon was also subjugated by two military occupations: Syria from 1976 to 2005 and Israel from 1982 to 2000. It has been the scene of several conflicts with Israel, of which the ongoing war marks the fourth Israeli invasion since 1978.

Lebanon is a developing country, ranked 102nd on the Human Development Index. It has been classified as a lower-middle-income country. The Lebanese liquidity crisis, coupled with nationwide corruption and disasters such as the 2020 Beirut explosion, precipitated the collapse of Lebanon's currency and fomented political instability, widespread resource shortages, and high unemployment and poverty. The World Bank has defined Lebanon's economic crisis as one of the world's worst since the 19th century. Despite the country's small size, Lebanese culture is renowned both in the Arab world and globally, powered primarily by the large and influential Lebanese diaspora. Lebanon is a founding member of the United Nations and the Arab League, and a member of the Non-Aligned Movement, the Organization of Islamic Cooperation, the Organisation internationale de la Francophonie, and the Group of 77.

== Etymology ==
The name of Mount Lebanon originates from the Phoenician root lbn (𐤋𐤁𐤍) meaning "white", apparently from its snow-capped peaks. Occurrences of the name have been found in different Middle Bronze Age texts from the library of Ebla, and three of the twelve tablets of the Epic of Gilgamesh. The name is recorded in Egypt as rmnn (Ancient Egyptian: 𓂋𓐰𓏠𓈖𓐰𓈖𓈉; it had no letter corresponding to l). The name occurs nearly 70 times in the Hebrew Bible as לְבָנוֹן Ləḇānon.

Lebanon as the name of an administrative unit (as opposed to the mountain range) that was introduced with the Ottoman reforms of 1861 as the Mount Lebanon Mutasarrifate (Arabic: متصرفية جبل لبنان, romanized: Mutaṣarrifīyat Jabal Lubnān; Ottoman Turkish: جبل لبنان متصرفليغى), continued in the name of Greater Lebanon (Arabic: دولة لبنان الكبير Dawlat Lubnān al-Kabīr; French: État du Grand Liban) in 1920, and eventually in the name of the sovereign Republic of Lebanon (Arabic: الجمهورية اللبنانية al-Jumhūriyyah al-Lubnāniyyah) upon its independence in 1943.

== History ==
=== Antiquity ===
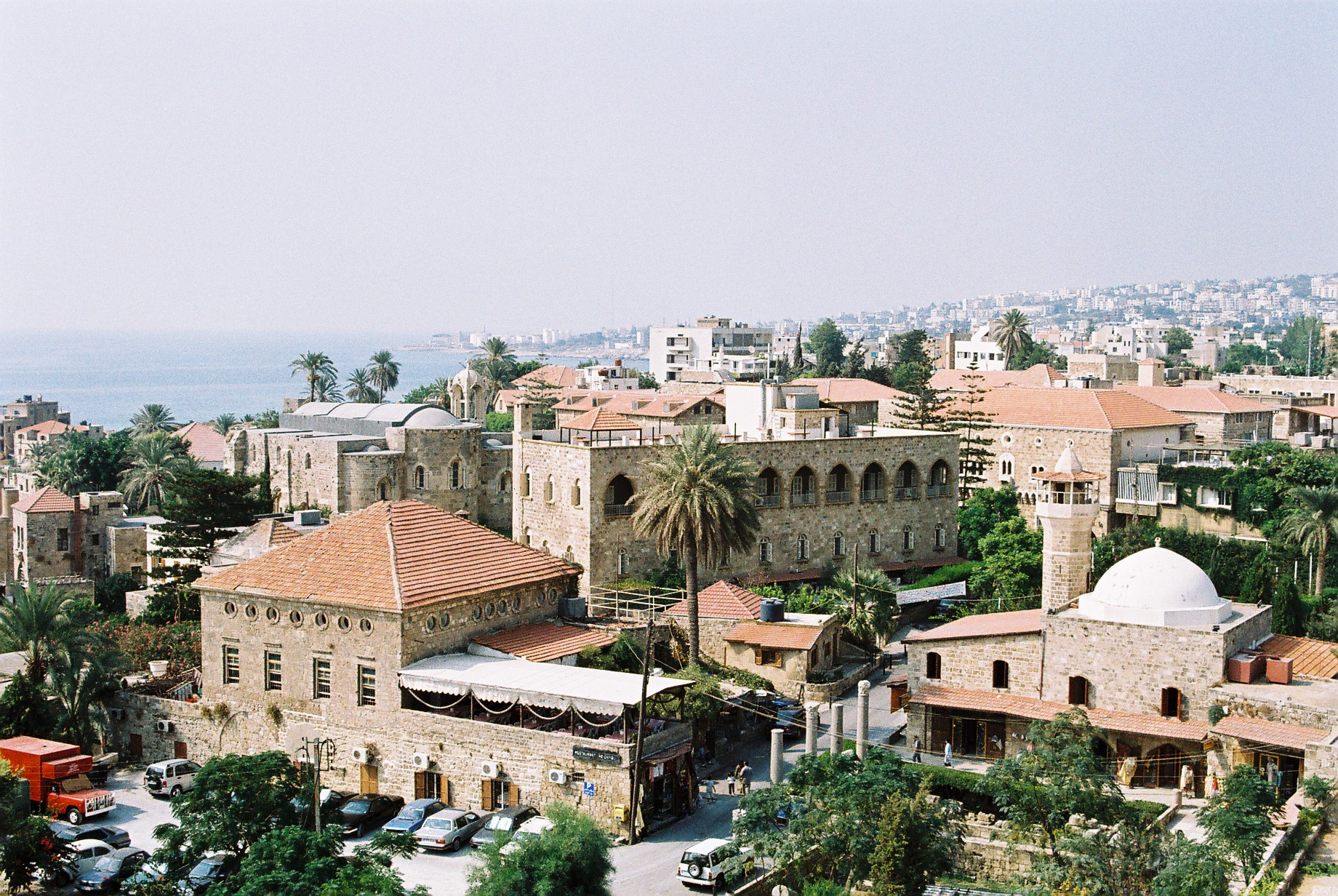
Byblos is believed to have been first occupied between 8800 and 7000 BC and continuously inhabited since 5000 BC, making it among the oldest continuously inhabited cities in the world. It is a UNESCO World Heritage Site.

The Natufian culture was the first to become sedentary at around 12000 BC.

Evidence of early settlement in Lebanon was found in Byblos, considered among the oldest continuously inhabited cities in the world. The evidence dates back to earlier than 5000 BC. Archaeologists discovered remnants of prehistoric huts with crushed limestone floors, primitive weapons, and burial jars left by the Neolithic and Chalcolithic fishing communities who lived on the shore of the Mediterranean Sea over 7,000 years ago.

Lebanon was part of northern Canaan, and consequently became the homeland of Canaanite descendants, the Phoenicians, a seafaring people based in the coastal strip of the northern Levant who spread across the Mediterranean in the first millennium BC. The most prominent Phoenician cities were Byblos, Sidon and Tyre. According to the Bible, King Hiram of Tyre collaborated closely with Solomon, supplying cedar logs for Solomon's Temple and sending skilled workers. The Phoenicians are credited with the invention of the oldest verified alphabet, which subsequently inspired the Greek alphabet and the Latin one thereafter.

In the 9th century BC, Phoenician colonies, including Carthage in present-day Tunisia and Cádiz in present-day Spain, flourished throughout the Mediterranean. Subsequently, foreign powers, starting with the Neo-Assyrian Empire, imposed tribute and attacked non-compliant cities. The Neo-Babylonian Empire took control in the 6th century BC. In 539 BC, the cities of Phoenicia were then incorporated into the Achaemenid Empire by Cyrus the Great. The Phoenician city-states were later incorporated into the empire of Alexander the Great following the siege of Tyre in 332 BCE.

A map of Phoenicia, trade routes and the Phoenician colony of Carthage

In 64 BC, the Roman general Pompey had the region of Syria annexed into the Roman Republic. The area was then split into two Imperial Provinces under the Roman Empire, Coele-Syria and Phoenice, the latter which the land of present-day Lebanon was a part of.

The region that is now Lebanon, as with the rest of Syria and much of Anatolia, became a major center of Christianity in the Roman Empire during the early spread of the faith. During the late 4th and early 5th century, a hermit named Maron established a monastic tradition focused on the importance of monotheism and asceticism near the Mediterranean mountain range known as Mount Lebanon. The monks who followed Maron spread his teachings among Lebanese in the region. These Christians became known as Maronites and moved into the mountains to avoid religious persecution by Roman authorities. During the frequent Roman–Persian Wars that lasted for many centuries, the Sasanian Empire occupied what is now Lebanon from 619 till 629.

=== Middle Ages ===
During the 7th century, Muslims conquered Syria from the Byzantines, incorporating the region, including modern-day Lebanon, under the Islamic Caliphate. In the era of Uthman's caliphate (644–656), Islam gained significant influence in Damascus, led by Mu'awiya, a relative of Uthman, serving as the governor. Mu'awiya sent forces to the coastal region of Lebanon, prompting conversions to Islam among the coastal population.The mountainous areas retained their Christian or other cultural practices. Despite Islam and Arabic becoming officially dominant, the population's conversion from Christianity and Syriac language was gradual. The Maronite community, in particular, managed to maintain a large degree of autonomy despite the succession of rulers over Lebanon and Syria. The relative isolation of the Lebanese mountains meant the mountains served as a refuge in the times of religious and political crises in the Levant. As such, the mountains displayed religious diversity and the existence of several well-established sects and religions, notably, Maronites, Druze, Shiite Muslims, Ismailis, Alawites and Jacobites.

After the Islamic conquest, Mediterranean trade declined for three centuries due to conflicts with the Byzantines. The ports of Tyre, Sidon, Beirut, and Tripoli struggled to recover, sustaining small populations under Umayyad and Abbasid rule. Christians and Jews were often obligated to pay the jizya, or poll tax levied on non-Muslims. During the 980s, the Fatimid Caliphate took control of the Levant, including Mount Lebanon, resulting in the rejuvenation of Mediterranean trade along the Lebanese coast through renewed connections with Byzantium and Italy. This resurgence saw Tripoli and Tyre flourishing well into the 11th century, focusing on exports such as textiles, sugar, and glassware.

During the 11th century, the Druze religion emerged from a branch of Shia Islam. The new religion gained followers in the southern portion of Mount Lebanon. The southern portion of Mount Lebanon was ruled by Druze feudal families till the early 14th century. The Maronite population increased gradually in Northern Mount Lebanon and the Druze have remained in Southern Mount Lebanon until the modern era. Keserwan, Jabal Amel and the Beqaa Valley was ruled by Shia feudal families under the Mamluks and the Ottoman Empire. Major cities on the coast, Sidon, Tyre, Acre, Tripoli, Beirut, and others, were directly administered by the Muslim Caliphs and the people became more fully absorbed by the Arab culture.

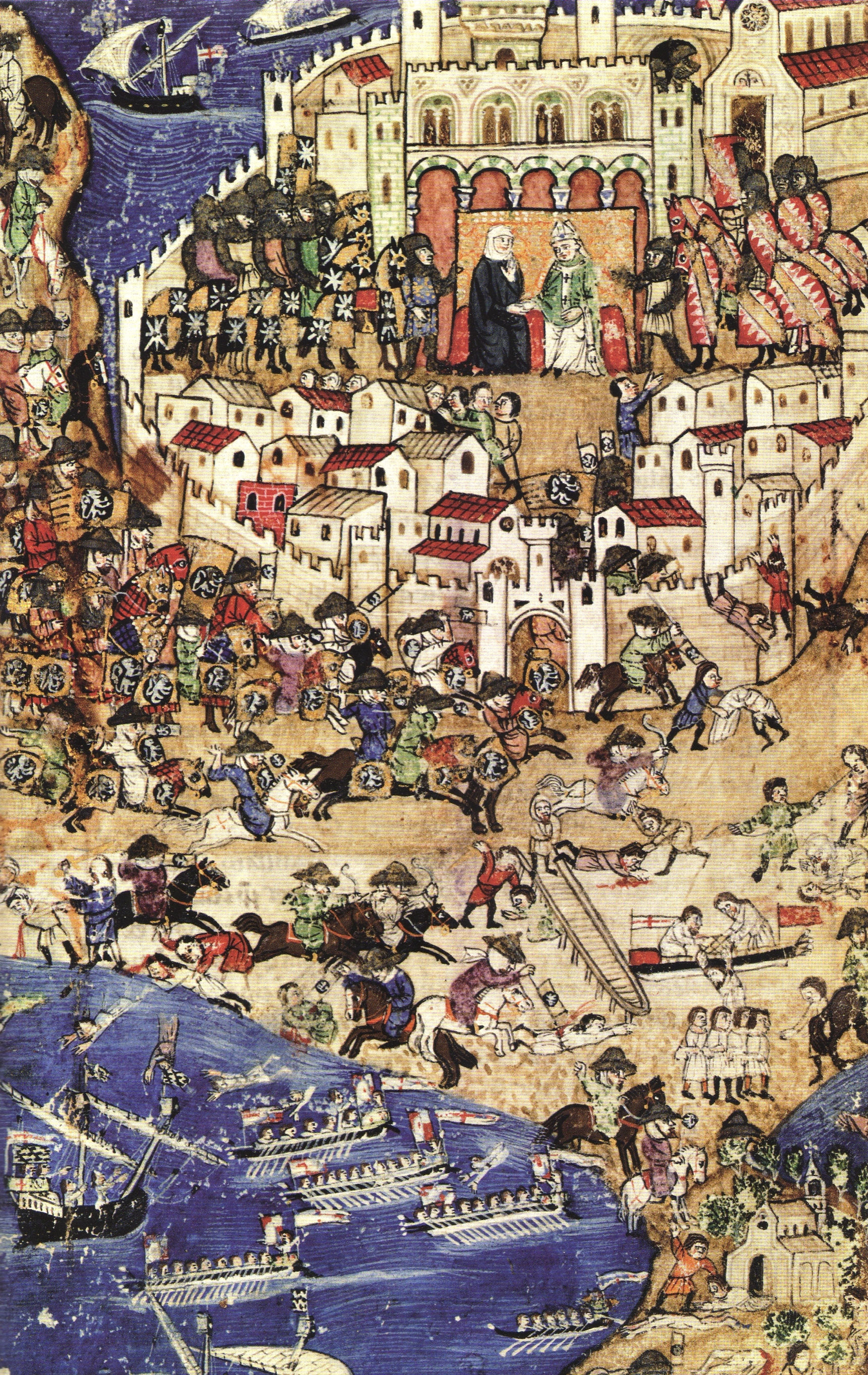
The Fall of Tripoli to the Egyptian Mamluks and destruction of the Crusader state, the County of Tripoli, 1289

Following the fall of Roman Anatolia to the Muslim Turks, the Byzantines put out a call to the Pope in Rome for assistance in the 11th century. The result was a series of wars known as the Crusades launched by the Franks from Western Europe to reclaim the former Byzantine Christian territories in the Eastern Mediterranean, especially Syria and Palestine (the Levant). The First Crusade succeeded in temporarily establishing the Kingdom of Jerusalem and the County of Tripoli as Roman Catholic Christian states along the coast. These crusader states made a lasting impact on the region, though their control was limited, and the region returned to full Muslim control after two centuries following the conquest by the Mamluks.

Among the most lasting effects of the Crusades in this region was the contact between the Franks (i.e., the French) and the Maronites. Unlike most other Christian communities in the Eastern Mediterranean, who swore allegiance to Constantinople or other local patriarchs, the Maronites proclaimed allegiance to the Pope in Rome. As such the Franks saw them as Roman Catholic brethren. These initial contacts led to centuries of support for the Maronites from France and Italy, even after the fall of the Crusader states in the region.

=== Ottoman rule ===
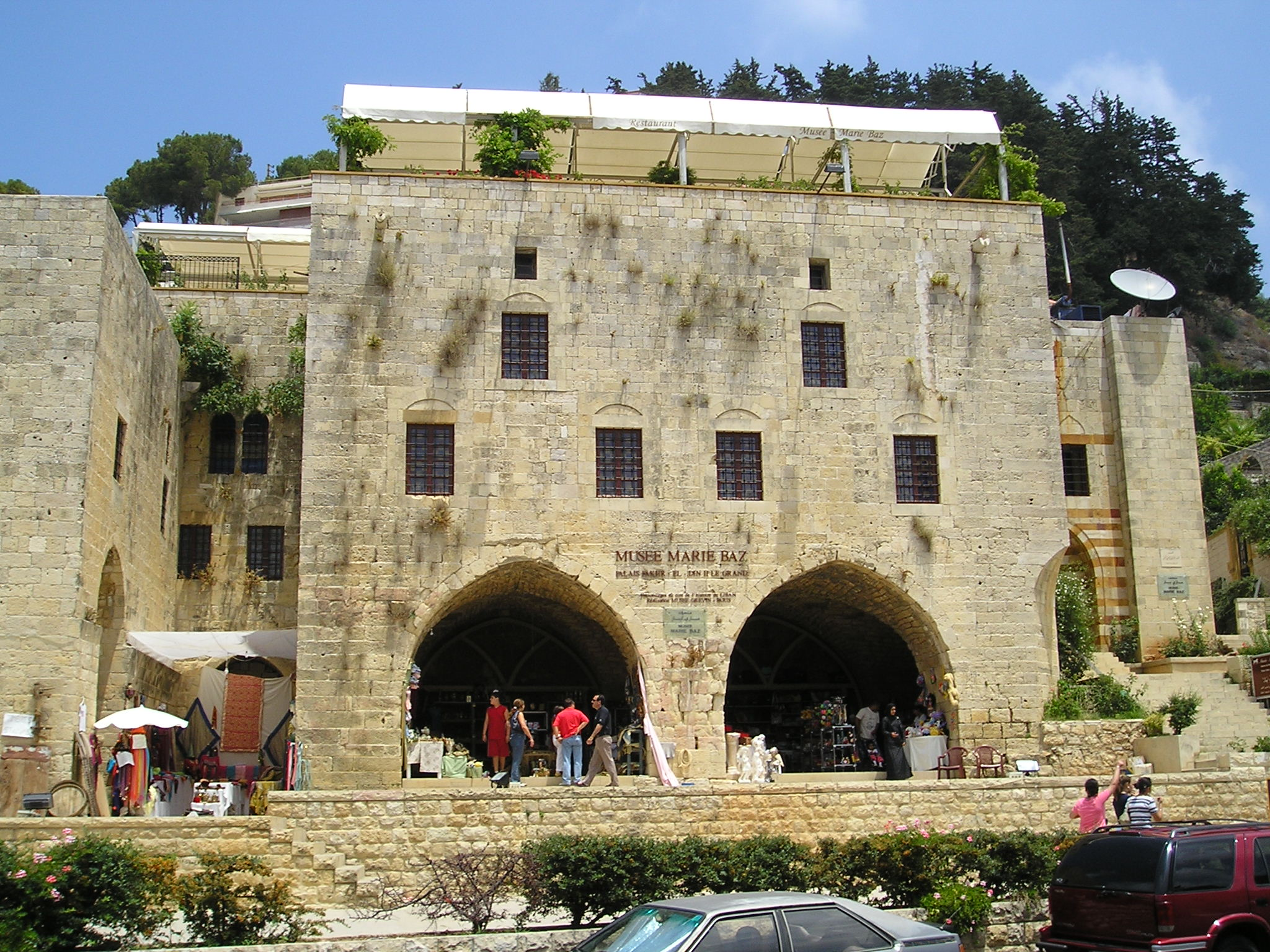
Fakhreddine II Palace, 17th century

In 1516, Lebanon became part of the Ottoman Empire, with governance administered indirectly through local emirs. Lebanon's area was organized into provinces: Northern and Southern Mount Lebanon, Tripoli, Baalbek and Beqaa Valley, and Jabal Amil.

In 1590, Druze tribal leader Fakhr al-Din II succeeded Korkmaz in southern Mount Lebanon and quickly asserted his authority as the paramount emir of the Druze in the Shouf region. Eventually, he was appointed Sanjak-bey, overseeing various Ottoman sub-provinces and tax collection. Expanding his influence extensively, he even constructed a fort in Palmyra.

This expansion raised concerns for Ottoman Sultan Murad IV, leading to a punitive expedition in 1633. Fakhr al-Din II was captured, imprisoned for two years, and subsequently executed in April 1635, along with one of his sons. Surviving members of his family continued to govern a reduced area under closer Ottoman supervision until the late 17th century. On the death of the last Maan emir, various members of the Shihab clan ruled Mount Lebanon until 1830.

While the history of Druze-Christian relations in Lebanon has generally been marked by harmony and peaceful coexistence, there were occasional periods of tension, notably during the 1860 Mount Lebanon civil war, during which around 10,000 Christians were killed by the Druze. Shortly afterwards, the Emirate of Mount Lebanon, which lasted about 400 years, was replaced by the Mount Lebanon Mutasarrifate, as a result of a European-Ottoman treaty called the Règlement Organique. The Mount Lebanon Mutasarrifate (1861–1918, Arabic: متصرفية جبل لبنان; Turkish: Cebel-i Lübnan Mutasarrıflığı) was one of the Ottoman Empire's subdivisions following the Tanzimat reform. After 1861 there existed an autonomous Mount Lebanon with a Christian mutasarrıf, which had been created as a homeland for the Maronites under European diplomatic pressure following the 1860 massacres. The Maronite Catholics and the Druze founded modern Lebanon in the early eighteenth century, through the ruling and social system known as the "Maronite-Druze dualism" in Mount Lebanon Mutasarrifate.

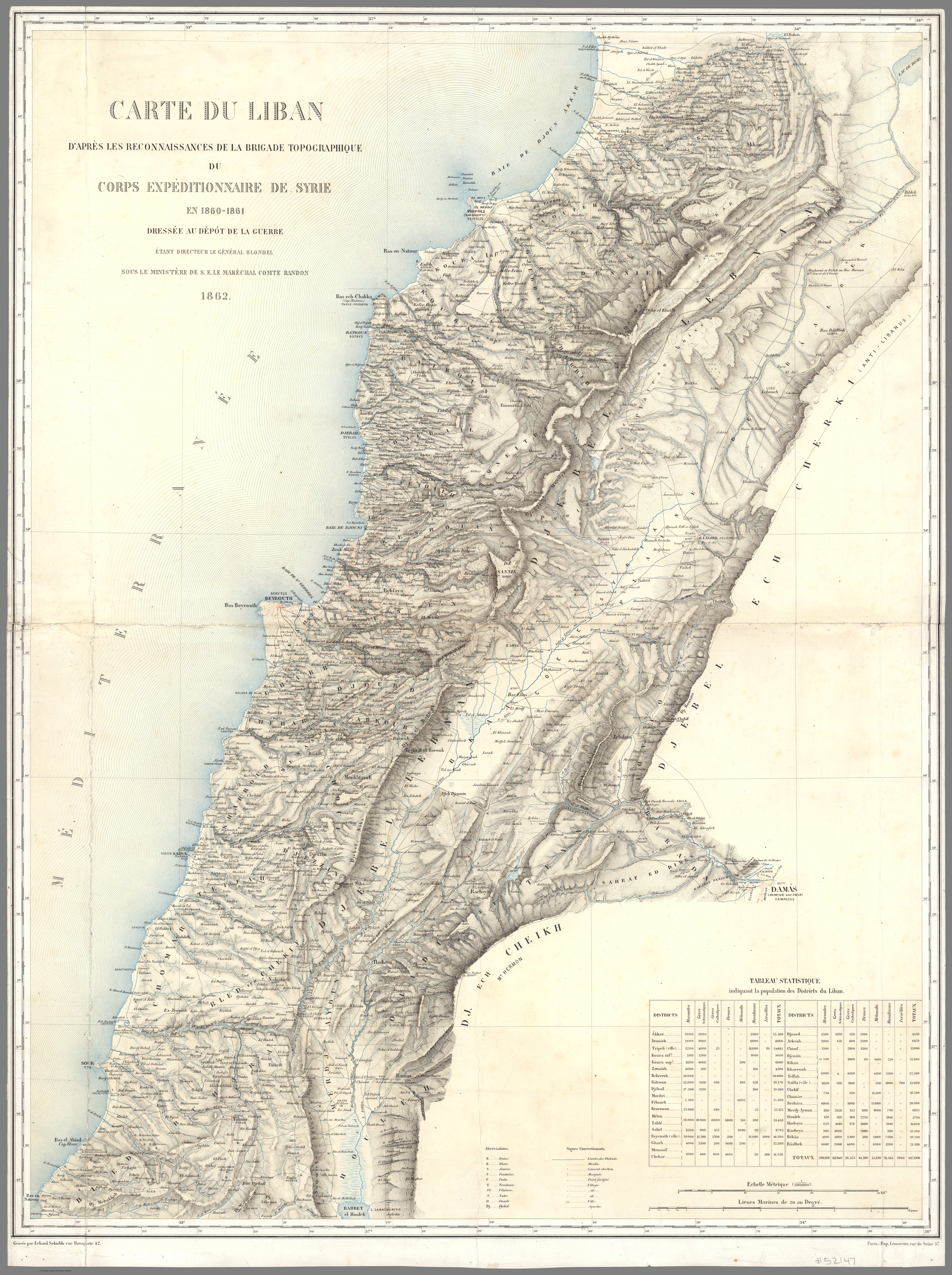
An 1862 map drawn by the French expedition of Beaufort d'Hautpoul, later used as a template for the 1920 borders of Greater Lebanon.

The Baalbek and Beqaa Valley and Jabal Amel was ruled intermittently by various Shia feudal families, especially the Al Ali Alsagheer in Jabal Amel that remained in power until 1865 when Ottomans took direct ruling of the region. Youssef Bey Karam, a Lebanese nationalist played an influential role in Lebanon's independence during this era.

Lebanon experienced profound devastation in the First World War when the Ottoman army assumed direct control, disrupting supplies and confiscating animals, ultimately leading to a severe famine. During the war, approximately 100,000 people in Beirut and Mount Lebanon died due to starvation.

=== French Mandate ===
Amidst the height of the First World War, the Sykes–Picot Agreement of 1916, a secret pact between Britain and France, delineated Lebanon and its surrounding areas as regions open to potential French influence or control. After the Allies emerged victorious in the war, the Ottoman Empire ultimately collapsed, losing control over the area. Soon after the war, Patriarch Elias Peter Hoayek, representing the Maronite Christians, successfully campaigned for an expanded territory at the 1919 Paris Peace Conference, also including areas with significant Muslim and Druze populations in addition to the Christian-dominated Mount Lebanon.

In 1920, King Faisal I proclaimed the Arab Kingdom of Syria's independence and asserted control over Lebanon. However, following a defeat to the French at the Battle of Maysalun, the kingdom was dissolved. Around the same time, at the San Remo Conference, tasked with deciding the fate of former Ottoman territories, it was determined that Syria and Lebanon would fall under French rule. Shortly afterward, the formal division of territories took place in the Treaty of Sèvres, signed a few months later.

On 1 September 1920, Greater Lebanon, or Grand Liban, was established under French control as a League of Nations Mandate, following the terms outlined in the proposed Mandate for Syria and the Lebanon. Greater Lebanon united the regions of Mount Lebanon, North Lebanon, South Lebanon, and the Bekaa, with Beirut as its designated capital. These specified boundaries later evolved into the present-day configuration of Lebanon. This arrangement was ratified in July 1922. The Lebanese Republic was officially proclaimed on 1 September 1926, with the adoption of a constitution inspired by the French constitution on 23 May 1926. While a Lebanese government was established, the country continued to be under French control.

==== Pressure on German-occupied France ====
A map of the French Mandate and the states created in 1920

Lebanon gained a measure of independence while France was occupied by Germany. General Henri Dentz, the Vichy High commissioner for Syria and Lebanon, played a major role in the independence of the nation. The Vichy authorities in 1941 allowed Germany to move aircraft and supplies through Syria to Iraq where they were used against British forces. The United Kingdom, fearing that Nazi Germany would gain full control of Lebanon and Syria by pressure on the weak Vichy government, sent its army into Syria and Lebanon.

After the fighting ended in Lebanon, General Charles de Gaulle visited the area. Under political pressure from both inside and outside Lebanon, de Gaulle recognized the independence of Lebanon. On 26 November 1941, General Georges Catroux announced that Lebanon would become independent under the authority of the Free French government. Elections were held in 1943 and on 8 November 1943 the new Lebanese government unilaterally abolished the mandate. The French reacted by imprisoning the new government. Lebanese nationalists declared a provisional government, and the British diplomatically intervened on their behalf. In the face of intense British pressure and protests by Lebanese nationalists, the French reluctantly released the government officials on 22 November 1943, and accepted the independence of Lebanon.

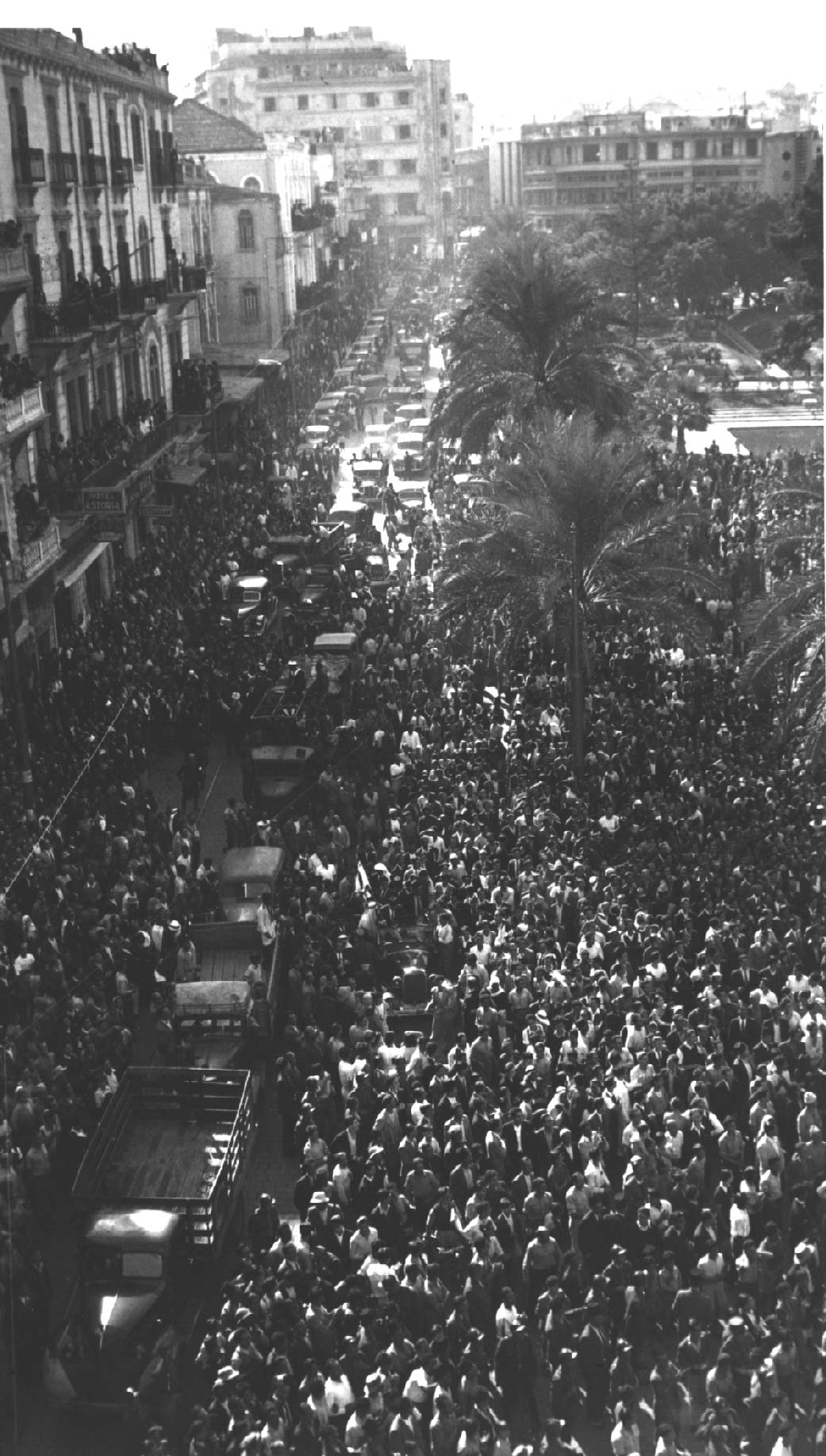
Martyrs' Square in Beirut during celebrations marking the release by the French of Lebanon's government from Rashayya prison on 22 November 1943

=== Independence from Free France ===
Following the end of World War II in Europe the French mandate may be said to have been terminated without any formal action on the part of the League of Nations or its successor the United Nations. The mandate was ended by the declaration of the mandatory power, and of the new states themselves, of their independence, followed by a process of piecemeal unconditional recognition by other powers, culminating in formal admission to the United Nations. Article 78 of the UN Charter ended the status of tutelage for any member state: "The trusteeship system shall not apply to territories which have become Members of the United Nations, relationship among which shall be based on respect for the principle of sovereign equality." So when the UN officially came into existence on 24 October 1945, after ratification of the United Nations Charter by the five permanent members, as both Syria and Lebanon were founding member states, the French mandate for both was legally terminated on that date and full independence attained. The last French troops withdrew in December 1946.

Lebanon's unwritten National Pact of 1943 required that its president be Maronite Christian, its speaker of the parliament to be a Shia Muslim, its prime minister be Sunni Muslim, and the Deputy Speaker of Parliament and the Deputy Prime Minister be Greek Orthodox.

Lebanon's history since independence has been marked by alternating periods of political stability and turmoil interspersed with prosperity built on Beirut's position as a regional center for finance and trade.

In May 1948, Lebanon supported neighboring Arab countries in a war against Israel. While some irregular forces crossed the border and carried out minor skirmishes against Israel, it was without the support of the Lebanese government, and Lebanese troops did not officially invade. Lebanon agreed to support the forces with covering artillery fire, armored cars, volunteers and logistical support. On 5–6 June 1948, the Lebanese army – led by the then Minister of National Defense, Emir Majid Arslan – captured Al-Malkiyya. This was Lebanon's only success in the war.

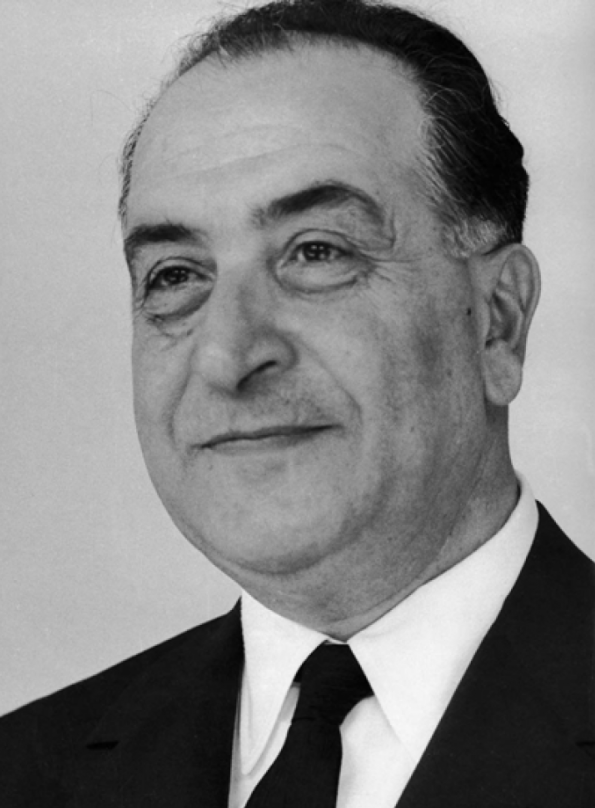
Under Fouad Chehab, Lebanon experienced economic growth and sectarian harmony

100,000 Palestinians fled to Lebanon because of the war. Israel did not permit their return after the cease-fire. As of 2017, between 174,000 and 450,000 Palestinian refugees live in Lebanon with about half in refugee camps (although these are often decades old and resemble neighborhoods). Often Palestinians are legally barred from owning property or performing certain occupations. According to Human Rights Watch, Palestinian refugees in Lebanon live in "appalling social and economic conditions."

In 1958, during the last months of President Camille Chamoun's term, an insurrection broke out, instigated by Lebanese Muslims who wanted to make Lebanon a member of the United Arab Republic. Chamoun requested assistance, and 5,000 United States Marines were briefly dispatched to Beirut on 15 July. After the crisis, a new government was formed, led by the popular former general Fouad Chehab.

Until the early 1970s, Lebanon was dubbed "the Switzerland of the Middle East" for its unique status as both a snow-capped holiday destination and secure banking hub for Gulf Arabs. Beirut was also nicknamed "the Paris of the Middle East."

=== Civil War and occupation ===
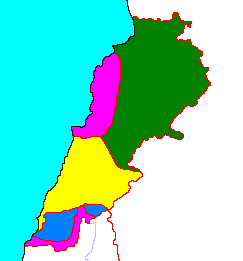
Map showing power balance in Lebanon, 1983: controlled by Syria controlled by Christian groups controlled by Israel controlled by the UN

With the defeat of the Palestine Liberation Organization in Jordan, many Palestinian militants relocated to Lebanon in 1970 and increased their armed campaign against Israel. The relocation also led to sectarian tensions between Palestinians versus the Maronites and other Lebanese factions. In 1975, following increasing tensions, largely boosted by Palestinian militant presence in the south, a full-scale civil war broke out in Lebanon. The war pitted a coalition of Christian groups against the joint forces of the PLO, left-wing Druze and Muslim militias. In October 1976 the Arab League agreed to establish a predominantly Syrian Arab Deterrent Force, which was charged with restoring calm.

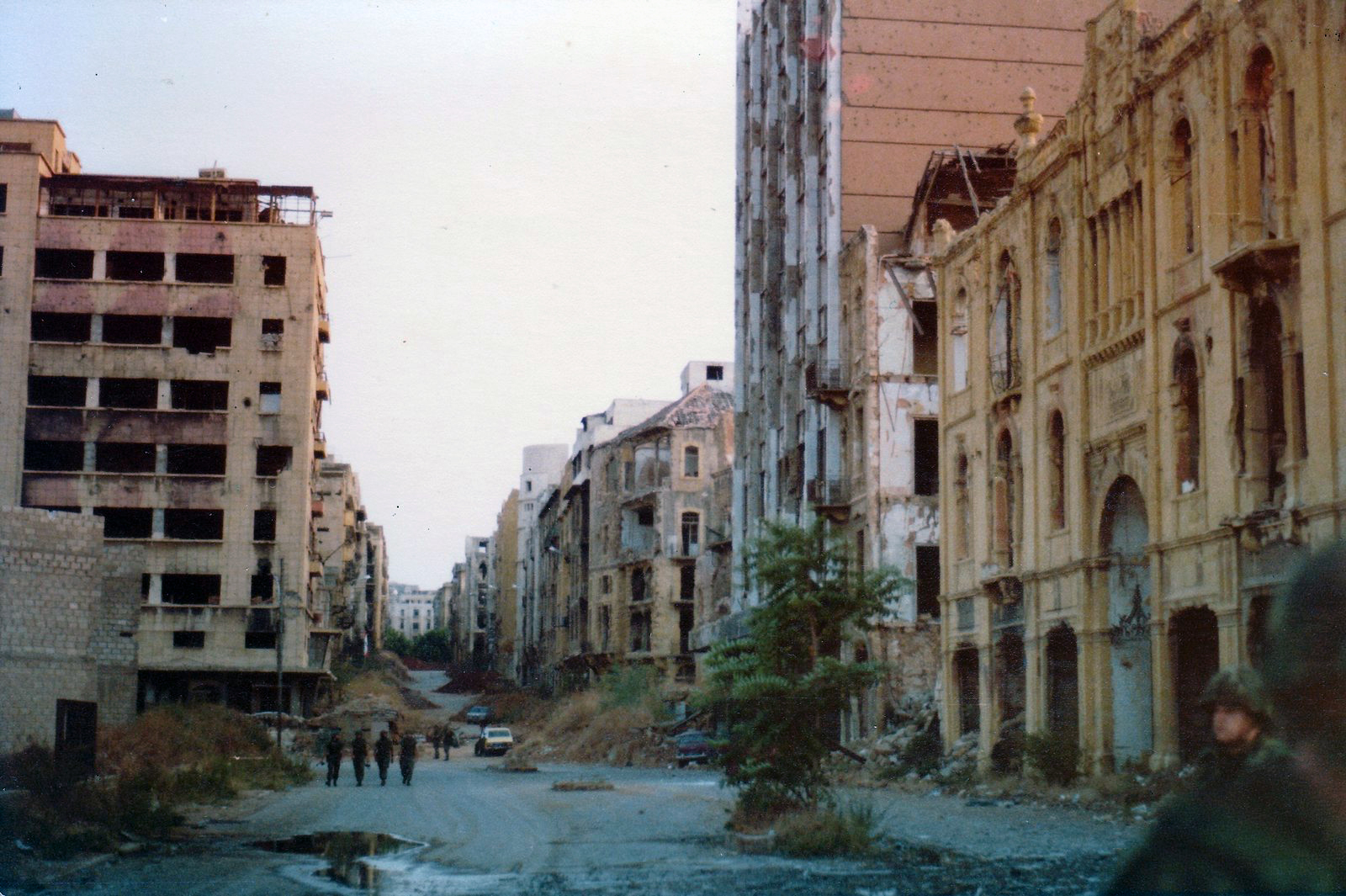
The Green Line that separated west and east Beirut, 1982

PLO attacks from Lebanon into Israel in 1977 and 1978 escalated tensions between two countries. On 11 March 1978, Fatah militants in northern Israel, hijacked two passenger buses, that killed 37 Israelis before being killed in a firefight with Israeli forces. Israel invaded Lebanon four days later and occupied most of the area south of the Litani River. The UNSC passed the Resolution 425 calling for immediate Israeli withdrawal and creating the U.N Interim Force in Lebanon (UNIFIL), charged with attempting to establish peace. Israeli forces withdrew later in 1978, but retained control of the southern region by managing a 19-kilometre-wide (12 mi) security zone along the border. These positions were held by the South Lebanon Army (SLA), a Christian militia under the leadership of Major Saad Haddad backed by Israel. The Israeli Prime Minister Menachem Begin, compared the plight of the Christian minority in southern Lebanon (then about 5% of the population in SLA territory) to that of European Jews during World War II.

The PLO routinely attacked Israel during the period of the cease-fire, with over 270 documented attacks. People in Galilee regularly had to leave their homes during these shellings. Documents captured in PLO headquarters after the invasion showed they had come from Lebanon. PLO leader Yasser Arafat refused to condemn these attacks on the grounds that the cease-fire was only relevant to Lebanon. In April 1980 the killing of two UNIFIL soldiers and the injuring of a third by the South Lebanon Army, near At Tiri, in the buffer zone led to a military conflict. On 17 July 1981, Israeli aircraft bombed multi-story apartment buildings in Beirut that contained offices of PLO associated groups. The Lebanese delegate to the United Nations Security Council claimed that 300 civilians had been killed and 800 wounded. The bombing led to worldwide condemnation, and a temporary embargo on the export of U.S. aircraft to Israel.

In August 1981, defense minister Ariel Sharon began to draw up plans to attack PLO military infrastructure in West Beirut, where PLO headquarters and command bunkers were located. In 1982, PLO attacks from Lebanon on Israel led to an Israeli invasion, aiming to support Lebanese forces in driving out the PLO. A multinational force of American, French and Italian contingents (joined in 1983 by a British contingent) were deployed in Beirut after the Israeli siege of the city, to supervise the evacuation of the PLO. The civil war re-emerged in September 1982 after the assassination of President Bachir Gemayel, an Israeli ally, and subsequent fighting. During this time a number of sectarian massacres occurred, such as in Sabra and Shatila, and in several refugee camps. The multinational force was withdrawn in the spring of 1984, following a devastating bombing attack during the previous year.

During the early 1980s, Hezbollah, a Shiite Islamist militant group and political party, came into existence through the efforts of Shiite clerics who were financially supported and trained by Iran. Arising in the aftermath of the 1982 war and drawing inspiration from the Islamic Revolution in Iran, Hezbollah actively engaged in combat against Israel as well as suicide attacks, car bombings and assassinations. Their objectives encompassed eliminating Israel, fighting for the Shia cause in the civil war, ending Western presence in Lebanon, and establishing a Shiite Khomeinist Islamic state.

In the late 1980s, as Amine Gemayel's second term as president drew to an end, the Lebanese pound collapsed. At the end of 1987 US$1 was worth £L500. This meant the legal minimum wage was worth just $17 a month. Most goods in shops were priced in dollars. A Save the Children director estimated that 200,000–300,000 children were in need of assistance and were living almost entirely on bread, which was subsidized by the government. Those who could relied on foreign assistance. Hezbollah was receiving about $3–5 million a month from Iran. In September 1988, the Parliament failed to elect a successor to President Gemayel as a result of differences between the Christians, Muslims, and Syrians. The Arab League Summit of May 1989 led to the formation of a Saudi–Moroccan–Algerian committee to solve the crisis.

On 16 September 1989 the committee issued a peace plan which was accepted by all. A ceasefire was established, the ports and airports were re-opened and refugees began to return. In the same month, the parliament agreed to the Taif Agreement, which included an outline timetable for Syrian withdrawal from Lebanon and a formula for the de-confessionalization of the Lebanese political system. The civil war ended at the end of 1990 after 16 years; it had caused massive loss of human life and property and devastated the country's economy. It is estimated that 150,000 people were killed and another 200,000 wounded. Nearly a million civilians were displaced by the war, and some never returned. Parts of Lebanon were left in ruins. The agreement has still not been implemented in full and Lebanon's political system continues to be divided along sectarian lines.

Conflict between Israel and Lebanese militants continued, leading to a series of violent events and clashes including the Qana massacre. In May 2000, Israeli forces fully withdrew from Lebanon. Since then, 25 May is regarded by the Lebanese as the Liberation Day. The internal political situation in Lebanon significantly changed in the early 2000s. After the Israeli withdrawal from southern Lebanon and the death of former Syrian president Hafez al-Assad in 2000, the Syrian military presence faced criticism and resistance from the Lebanese population.

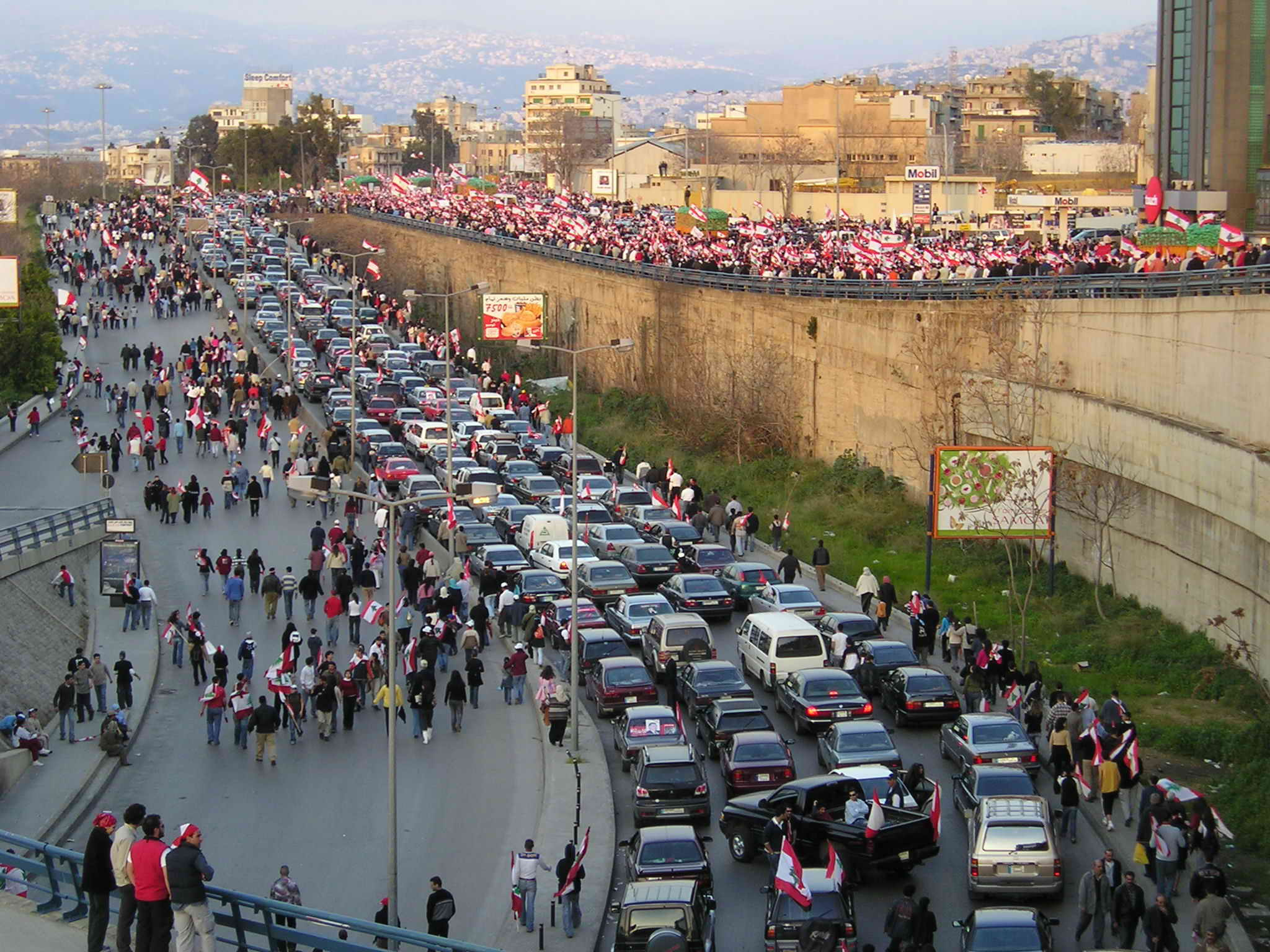
Demonstrations in Lebanon triggered by the assassination of Rafik Hariri on 14 February 2005

On 14 February 2005, former Prime Minister Rafic Hariri was assassinated in a car bomb explosion. Leaders of the March 14 Alliance accused Syria of the attack, while Syria and the March 8 Alliance claimed that Israel was behind the assassination. It marked the beginning of a series of assassinations that resulted in the death of many prominent Lebanese figures and triggered the demonstrations which demanded the withdrawal of the Syrian troops from Lebanon and the establishment of an international commission to investigate the assassination. (Note: 2005: Bassel Fleihan, Lebanese legislator and Minister of Economy and Commerce; Samir Kassir, Columnist and Democratic Left Movement leader; George Hawi, former head of Lebanese Communist Party; Gibran Tueni, Editor in Chief of "An Nahar" newspaper. 2006: Pierre Gemayel, Minister of Industry. 2007: Walid Eido, MP; Antoine Ghanim, MP.) Under the pressure from the West, Syria began withdrew from Lebanon by 26 April. UNSC Resolution 1595 called for an investigation into the assassination. The UN International Independent Investigation Commission published preliminary findings on 20 October 2005 in the Mehlis report, which cited indications that the assassination was organized by Syrian and Lebanese intelligence services.

=== Post-war revolution and spillover of the Syrian conflict ===
On 12 July 2006, Hezbollah launched a series of rocket attacks and raids into Israeli territory, where they killed three Israeli soldiers and captured two others. Israel responded with airstrikes and artillery fire on targets in Lebanon, and a ground invasion of southern Lebanon, resulting in the 2006 Lebanon War. The conflict was officially ended by the UNSC Resolution 1701 on 14 August 2006, which ordered a ceasefire, the withdrawal of Israeli forces from Lebanon, and the disarmament of Hezbollah. Some 1,191 Lebanese and 160 Israelis were killed in the conflict. Beirut's southern suburb was heavily damaged by Israeli airstrikes.

In 2007, the Nahr al-Bared refugee camp became the center of the 2007 Lebanon conflict between the Lebanese Army and Fatah al-Islam. At least 169 soldiers, 287 insurgents and 47 civilians were killed in the battle. Funds for the reconstruction of the area have been slow to materialize. Between 2006 and 2008, a series of protests led by groups opposed to the pro-Western Prime Minister Fouad Siniora demanded the creation of a national unity government, over which the mostly Shia opposition groups would have veto power. When Émile Lahoud's presidential term ended in October 2007, the opposition refused to vote for a successor unless a power-sharing deal was reached, leaving Lebanon without a president.

On 7 May 2008, Hezbollah and Amal forces, sparked by a government declaration that Hezbollah's communications network was illegal, seized western Beirut, the most important Sunni center in Lebanon, leading to an intrastate military conflict. The Lebanese government denounced the violence as a coup attempt. At least 62 people died in the resulting clashes between pro-government and opposition militias. On 21 May 2008, the signing of the Doha Agreement ended the fighting. As part of the accord, which ended 18 months of political paralysis, Michel Suleiman became president and a national unity government was established, granting a veto to the opposition. The agreement was a victory for opposition forces, as the government caved in to all their main demands.

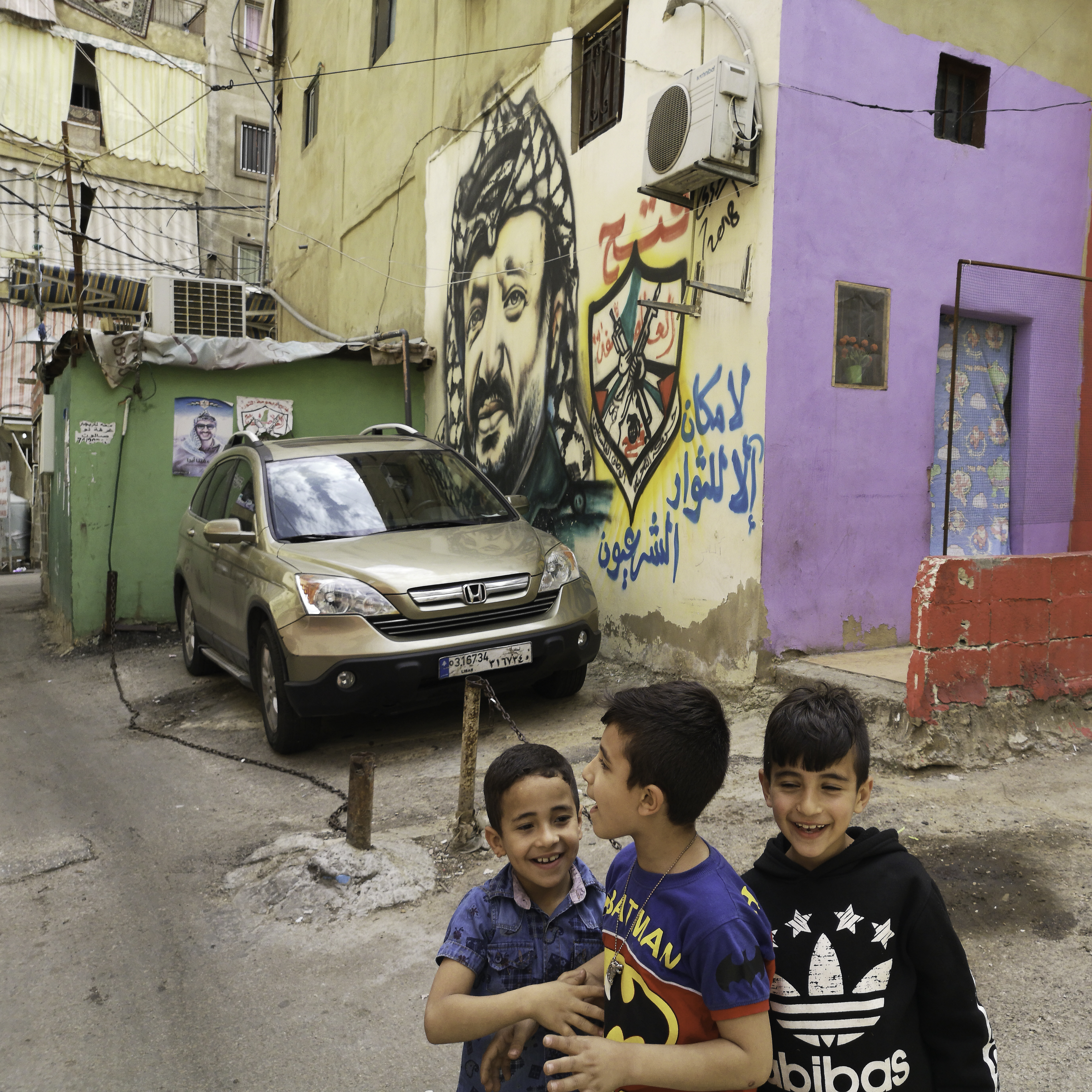
Over 20,000 Syrian and Palestinian refugees live in the Shatila refugee camp on the outskirts of Beirut.

In early January 2011, the national unity government collapsed due to growing tensions stemming from the Special Tribunal for Lebanon, which was expected to indict Hezbollah members for the Hariri assassination. The parliament elected Najib Mikati, the candidate for the Hezbollah-led March 8 Alliance, Prime Minister of Lebanon, making him responsible for forming a new government. Hezbollah leader Hassan Nasrallah later accused Israel of assassinating Hariri. A report leaked by the Al-Akhbar newspaper in November 2010 stated that Hezbollah had drafted plans for a violent takeover of the country in case the Special Tribunal for Lebanon issued an indictment against its members.

In 2012, the Syrian civil war threatened to spill over in Lebanon, causing incidents of sectarian violence and armed clashes between Sunnis and Alawites in Tripoli. According to UNHCR, the number of Syrian refugees in Lebanon increased from around 250,000 in early 2013 to 1,000,000 in late 2014. In 2013, The Lebanese Forces Party, the Kataeb Party and the Free Patriotic Movement voiced concerns that the country's sectarian based political system is being undermined by the influx of Syrian refugees. On 6 May 2015, UNHCR suspended registration of Syrian refugees at the request of the Lebanese government. In February 2016, the Lebanese government signed the Lebanon Compact, granting a minimum of €400 million of support for refugees and vulnerable Lebanese citizens. As of October 2016, the government estimated that the country hosts 1.5 million Syrians.

=== National crisis (2019–present) ===
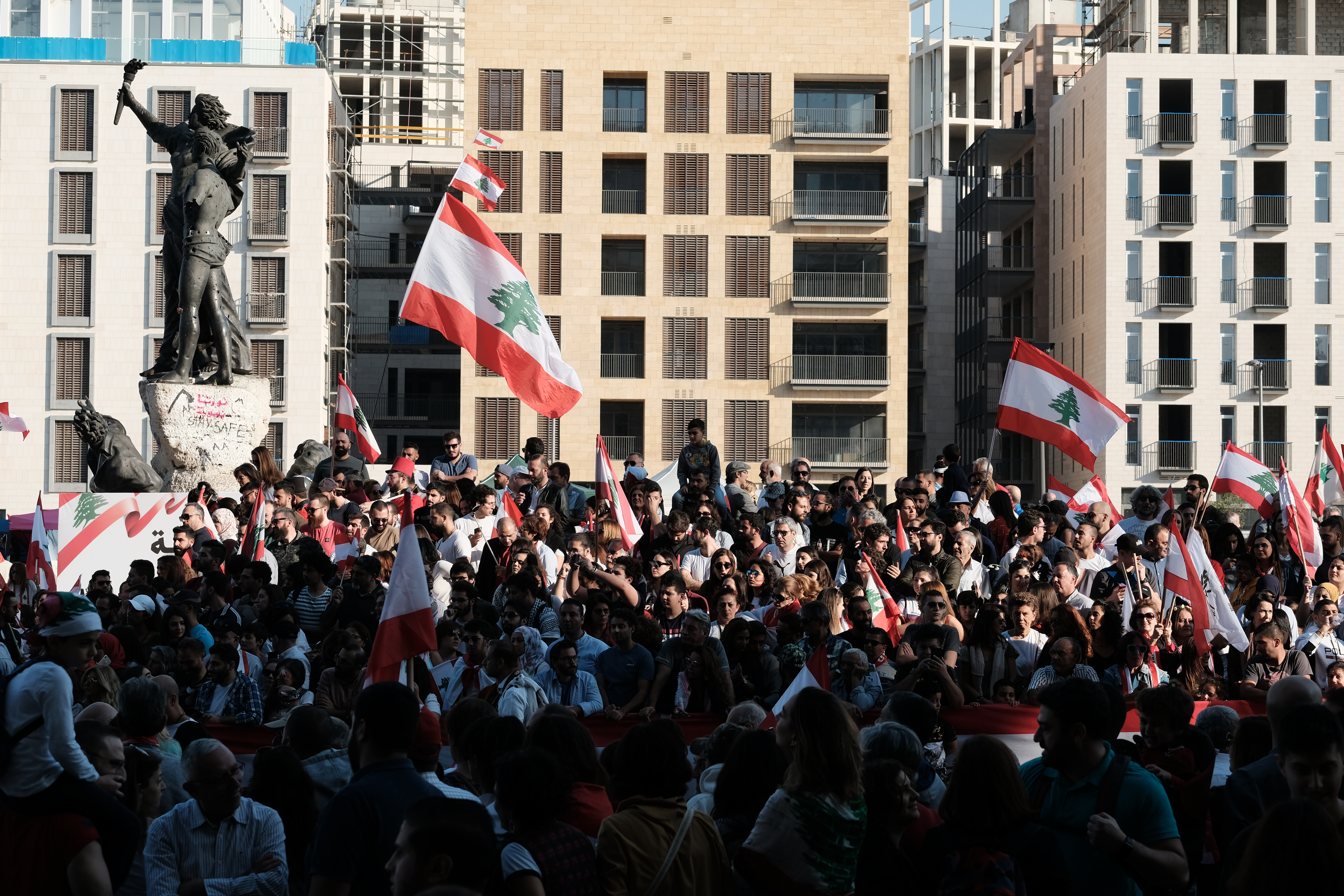
The 2019 protests were non-sectarian, crossing the Sunni–Shia Muslim / Christian sociological and religious divide.

On 17 October 2019, the first of a series of mass civil demonstrations erupted; they were initially triggered by planned taxes on gasoline, tobacco and online phone calls such as through WhatsApp, but quickly expanded into a country-wide condemnation of sectarian rule, a stagnant economy and liquidity crisis, unemployment, endemic corruption in the public sector, legislation (such as banking secrecy) that is perceived to shield the ruling class from accountability and failures from the government to provide basic services such as electricity, water and sanitation.

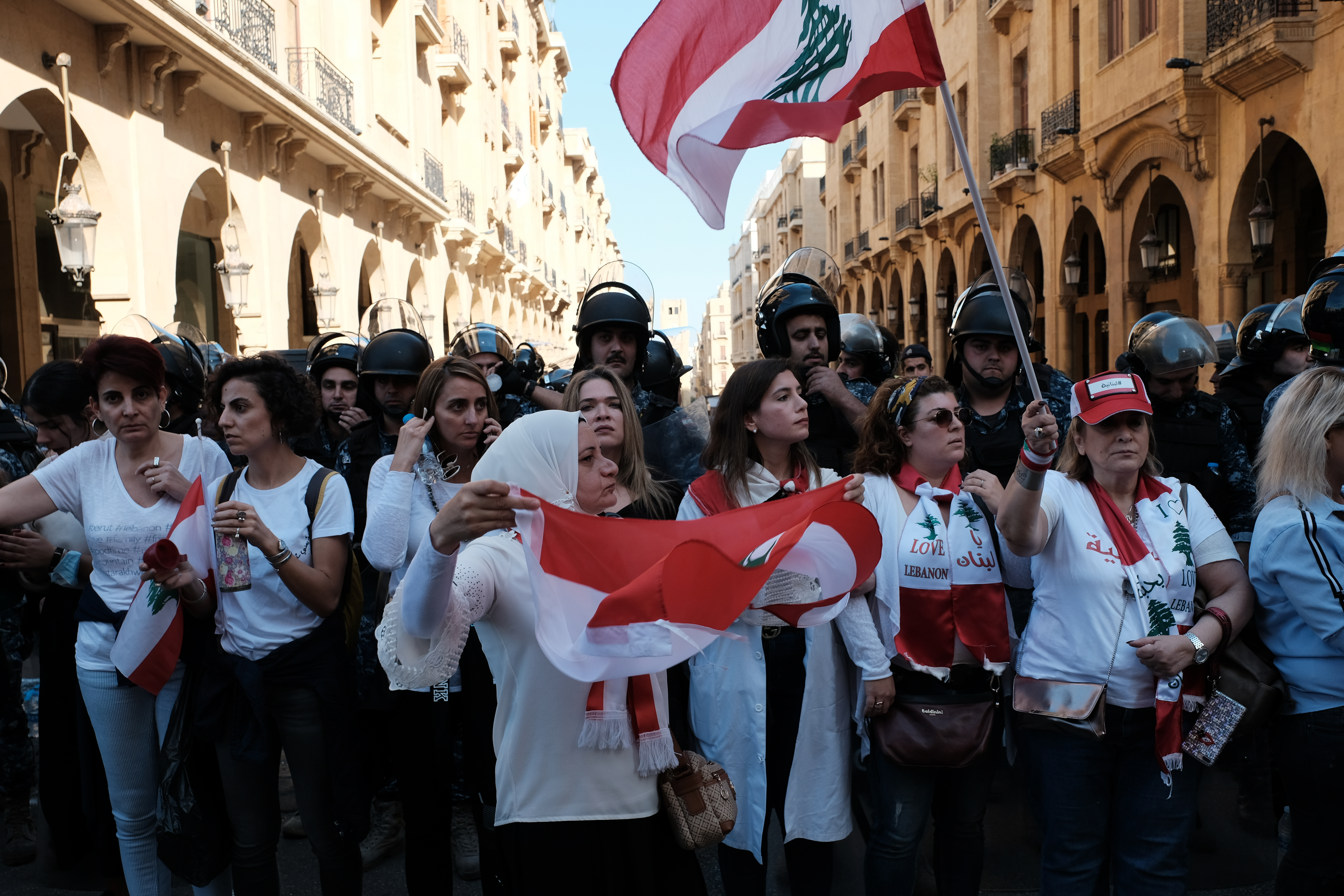
Women protesters forming a line between riot police and protesters in Riad el Solh, Beirut; 19 November 2019

As a result of the protests, Lebanon entered a political crisis, with Prime Minister Saad Hariri tendering his resignation and echoing protestors' demands for a government of independent specialists. Other politicians targeted by the protests have remained in power. On 19 December 2019, former Minister of Education Hassan Diab was designated the next prime minister and tasked with forming a new cabinet. Protests and acts of civil disobedience continued, with protesters denouncing and condemning the designation of Diab as prime minister. By July 2020, Lebanon was suffering the worst economic crisis in decades. Lebanon was the first country in the Middle East and North Africa to see its inflation rate exceed 50% for 30 consecutive days, according to Steve H. Hanke, professor of applied economics at the Johns Hopkins University.

On 4 August 2020, an explosion at the port of Beirut, Lebanon's main port, destroyed the surrounding areas, killing over 200 people, and injuring thousands more. The cause of the explosion was later determined to be 2,750 tonnes of ammonium nitrate that had been unsafely stored, and accidentally set on fire that Tuesday afternoon. Protests resumed within days following the explosion, which resulted in the resignation of Prime Minister Hassan Diab and his cabinet on 10 August 2020, nonetheless continuing to stay in office in a caretaker capacity. Demonstrations continued into 2021 with Lebanese blocking the roads with burned tires protesting against the poverty and the economic crisis.

On 11 March 2021 the caretaker minister of energy Raymond Ghajar warned that Lebanon was threatened with "total darkness" at the end of March if no money was secured to buy fuel for power stations. In August 2021, a large fuel explosion in northern Lebanon killed 28 people. September saw the formation of a new cabinet led by former prime minister Najib Mikati. On 9 October 2021, the entire nation lost power for 24 hours after its two main power stations ran out of power due to the currency and fuel shortage. Days later, sectarian violence in Beirut killed a number of people in the deadliest clashes in the country since 2008. By January 2022, BBC News reported that the crisis in Lebanon had deepened further, with the value of the Lebanese pound plummeting and a scheduled general election expected to be delayed indefinitely. The postponement of parliamentary elections was said to prolong the political deadlock in the country. The European Parliament called Lebanon's present situation a 'man-made disaster caused by a handful of men across the political class'.

In May 2022, Lebanon held its first election since a painful economic crisis dragged it to the brink of becoming a failed state. Lebanon's crisis has been so severe that more than 80 percent of the population is now considered poor by the United Nations. In the election the Shia Muslim Hezbollah movement (and its allies) lost their parliamentary majority. Hezbollah did not lose any of its seats, but its allies lost seats. Hezbollah's ally, President Michel Aoun's Free Patriotic Movement, was no longer the biggest Christian party after the election. A rival Christian party, the Lebanese Forces led by Samir Geagea, became the largest Christian-based party in parliament. The Sunni Future Movement, led by former prime minister Saad Hariri, did not participate in the election, leaving a political vacuum for other Sunni politicians to fill. The Lebanese crisis became so severe that multiple boats left the coast holding migrants in a desperate run from the country. Many proved unsuccessful and fatal. In April 2022, 6 people died and around 50 people were rescued after an overloaded boat sunk in Tripoli. On 22 September, at least 94 people were killed when a boat carrying migrants from Lebanon capsized off Syria's coast. 9 people survived. Many were declared missing and some were found either dead or injured. Dead bodies were sent to nearby hospitals. 40 people remained missing as of 24 September.

On 1 February 2023, the central bank of Lebanon devalued the Lebanese pound by 90% amid the ongoing financial crisis. This was the first time Lebanon had devalued its official exchange rate in 25 years. As of 2023, Lebanon is considered to have become a failed state, suffering from chronic poverty, economic mismanagement and a banking collapse.

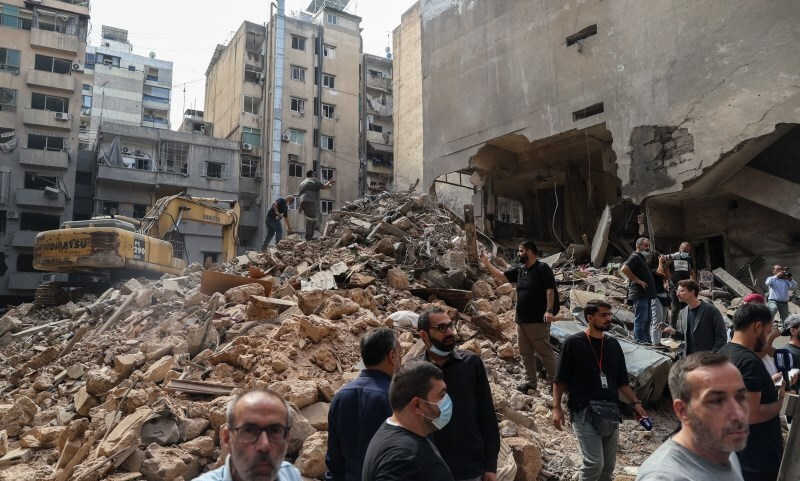
Aftermath of the October 2024 Bachoura airstrike in central Beirut

The Gaza war sparked a renewed Israel–Hezbollah conflict. In 2024, Hezbollah said it would not stop attacking Israel until Israel ceases its attacks in Gaza. Starting with the Israeli explosion of Lebanese pagers and walkie talkies in September 2024, the conflict escalated severely, with the 23 September 2024 Israeli airstrikes on Lebanon killing at least 558 people, and sparking a mass exodus from southern Lebanon. On 27 September 2024, Hezbollah leader Hassan Nasrallah was killed in an Israeli airstrike. On 1 October 2024, Lebanon was invaded by Israel with the objective of destroying infrastructure belonging to Hezbollah in the south of the country. In November 2024, a ceasefire deal was signed between Israel and the Lebanese armed group Hezbollah to end 13 months of conflict. According to the agreement, Hezbollah was given 60 days to end its armed presence in southern Lebanon and Israeli forces were obliged to withdraw from the area over the same period.

The fall of Assad's Baathist regime in Syria was another blow to its Lebanese ally, Hezbollah, which was already weakened because of Israeli military actions. An analysis by the United States Institute of Peace reported on a sense that the Syrian regime change in December 2024 started a new chapter in Lebanese politics.

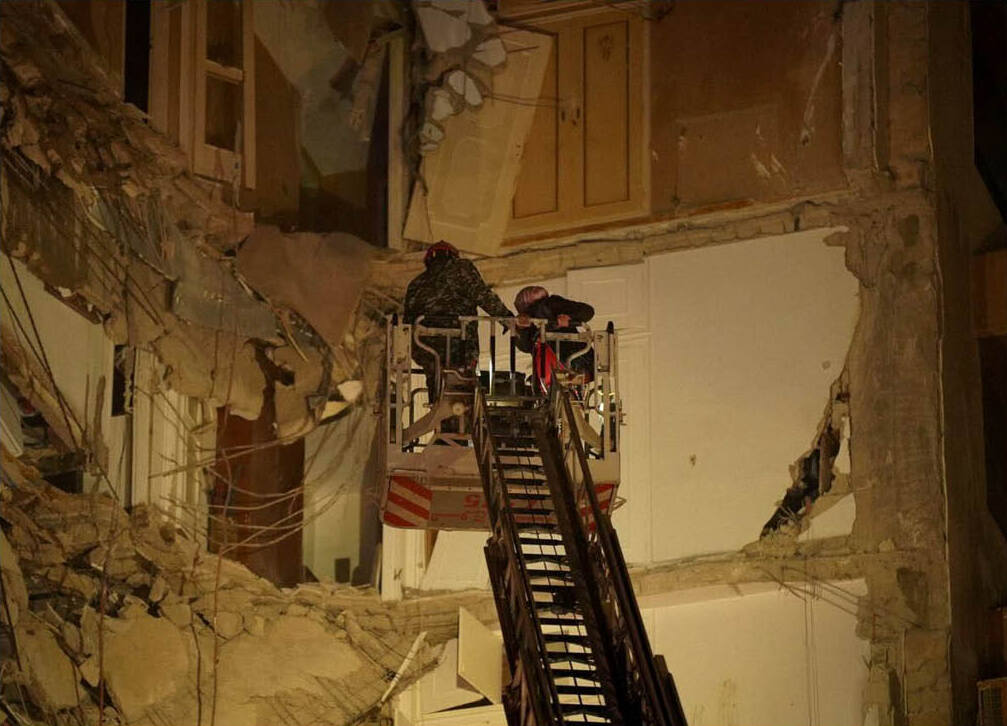
Aftermath of the 8 April 2026 Israeli airstrikes on Lebanon, which killed 357 people.

In January 2025, Joseph Aoun, the Lebanese army commander, was elected Lebanese 14th president after a two-year vacancy. In February 2025, Prime Minister Nawaf Salam, former president of the International Court of Justice (ICJ), formed a new government of 24 ministers after two-year caretaker cabinet. On 26 February 2025, Lebanon's government of Nawaf Salam won a confidence vote in parliament.

Since 2 March 2026, intensified Israeli attacks across Lebanon have killed over 1,000 people and displaced nearly 1 million, representing approximately 20% of the country's population. On 24 March, Israeli Defence Minister Israel Katz announced plans to establish a "defensive buffer zone" by occupying southern Lebanon up to the Litani River. This plan was expanded on 31 March, when Katz stated that residential structures in border villages would be demolished to prevent the return of approximately 600,000 displaced residents.

== Geography ==
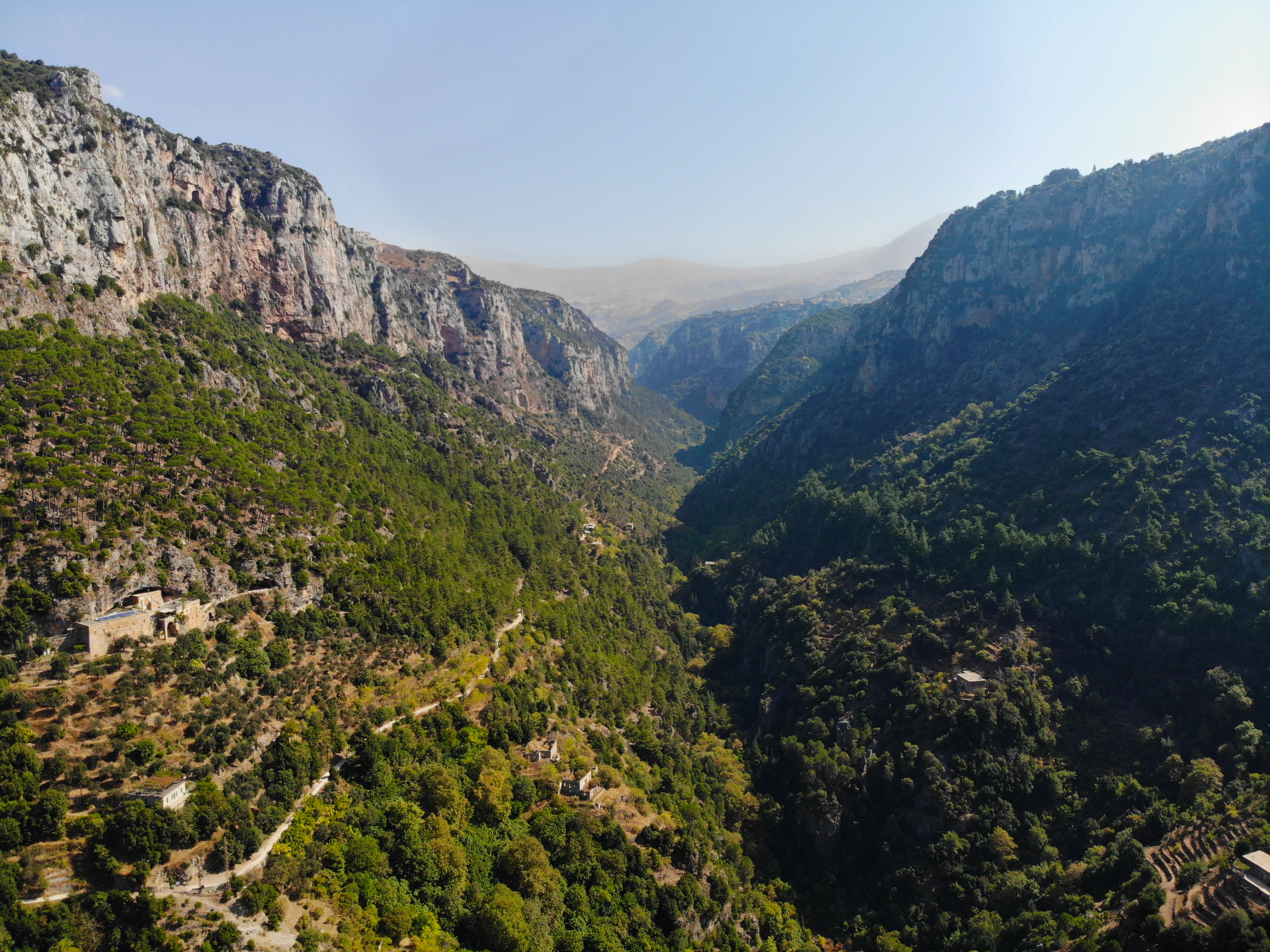
Kadisha Valley, a view from Qannoubine Monastery

Lebanon is located in West Asia between latitudes 33° and 35° N and longitudes 35° and 37° E. Its land straddles the "northwest of the Arabian Plate". The country's surface area is 10,452 square kilometres (4,036 sq mi) of which 10,230 square kilometres (3,950 sq mi) is land. Lebanon has a coastline and border of 225 kilometres (140 mi) on the Mediterranean Sea to the west, a 375 kilometres (233 mi) border shared with Syria to the north and east and a 79 kilometres (49 mi) long border with Israel to the south. The border with the Israeli-occupied Golan Heights is disputed by Lebanon in a small area called Shebaa Farms.

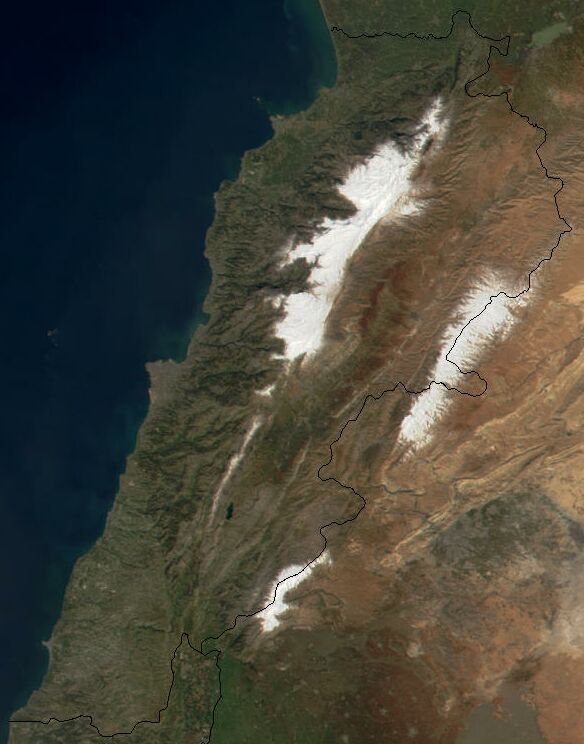
Lebanon from space. Snow cover can be seen on the western Mount Lebanon and eastern Anti-Lebanon mountain ranges.

Lebanon is divided into four distinct physiographic regions: the coastal plain, the Lebanon mountain range, the Beqaa Valley and the Anti-Lebanon Mountains. The narrow and discontinuous coastal plain stretches from the Syrian border in the north where it widens to form the Akkar plain to Ras al-Naqoura at the border with Israel in the south. The fertile coastal plain is formed of marine sediments and river deposited alluvium alternating with sandy bays and rocky beaches. Lebanon's mountains rise steeply parallel to the Mediterranean coast and form a ridge of limestone and sandstone that runs for most of the country's length.

The mountain range varies in width between 10 km (6 mi) and 56 km (35 mi); it is carved by narrow and deep gorges. The Lebanon mountains peak at 3,088 metres (10,131 ft) above sea level in Qurnat as Sawda' in North Lebanon and gradually slope to the south before rising again to a height of 2,695 metres (8,842 ft) in Mount Sannine. The Beqaa valley sits between the Lebanon mountains in the west and the Anti-Lebanon range in the east; it is a part of the Great Rift Valley system. The valley is 180 km (112 mi) long and 10 to 26 km (6 to 16 mi) wide, its fertile soil is formed by alluvial deposits. The Anti-Lebanon range runs parallel to the Lebanon mountains, its highest peak is in Mount Hermon at 2,814 metres (9,232 ft).

The mountains of Lebanon are drained by seasonal torrents and rivers foremost of which is the 145 kilometres (90 mi) long Leontes that rises in the Beqaa Valley to the west of Baalbek and empties into the Mediterranean Sea north of Tyre. Lebanon has 16 rivers all of which are non-navigable; 13 rivers originate from Mount Lebanon and run through the steep gorges and into the Mediterranean Sea, the other three arise in the Beqaa Valley.

=== Climate ===
Lebanon has a moderate Mediterranean climate. In coastal areas, winters are generally cool and rainy whilst summers are hot and humid. In more elevated areas, temperatures usually drop below freezing during the winter with heavy snow cover that remains until early summer on the higher mountaintops. Although most of Lebanon receives a relatively large amount of rainfall, when measured annually in comparison to its arid surroundings, certain areas in north-eastern Lebanon receives only little because of the rain shadow created by the high peaks of the western mountain range. Storm Adam 2025 saw severe polar weather system affecting Lebanon with low temperatures and snow expected to fall at elevations as low as 300 meters above sea level.

=== Environment ===
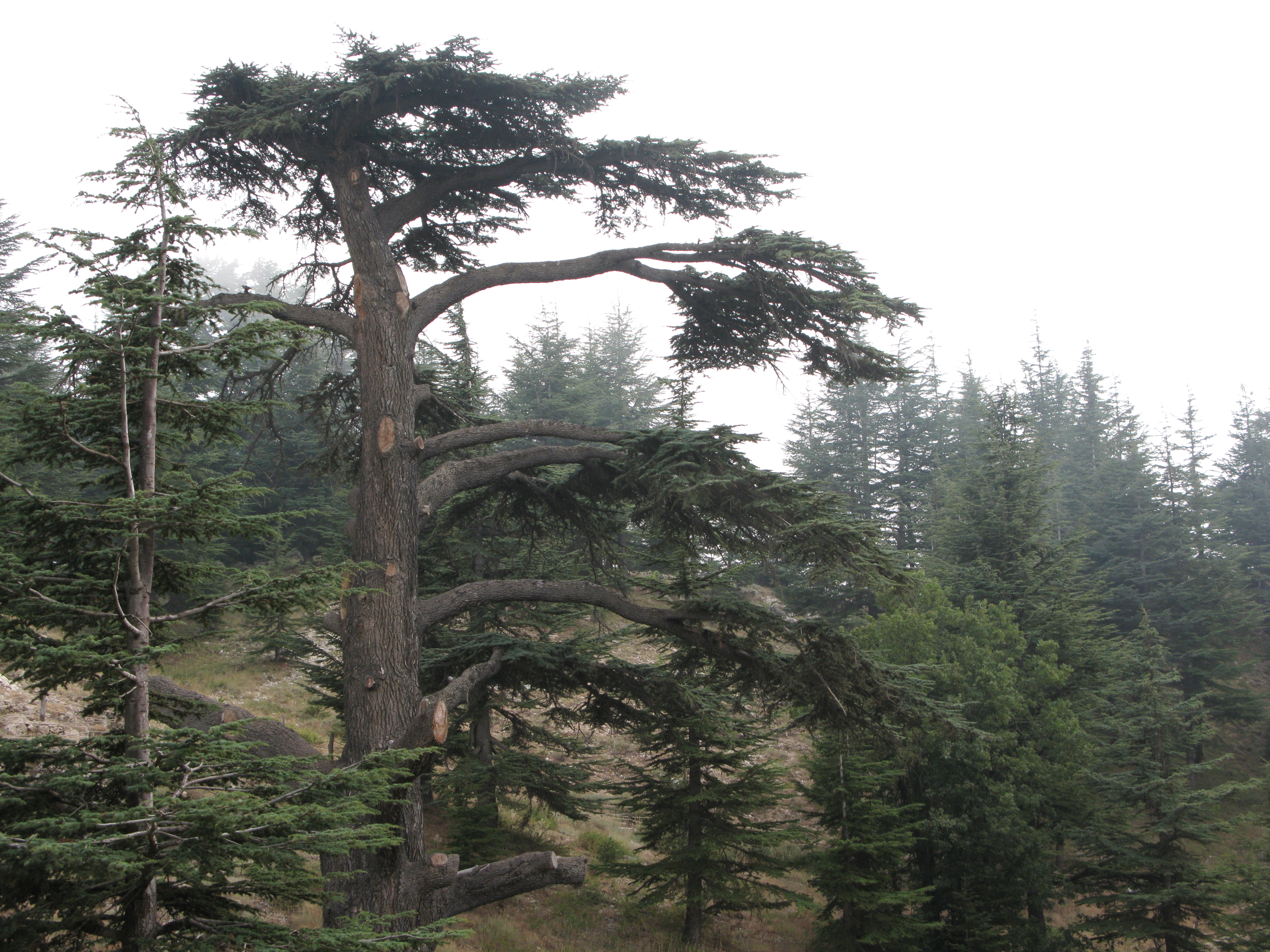
The Lebanon cedar is the national emblem of Lebanon.

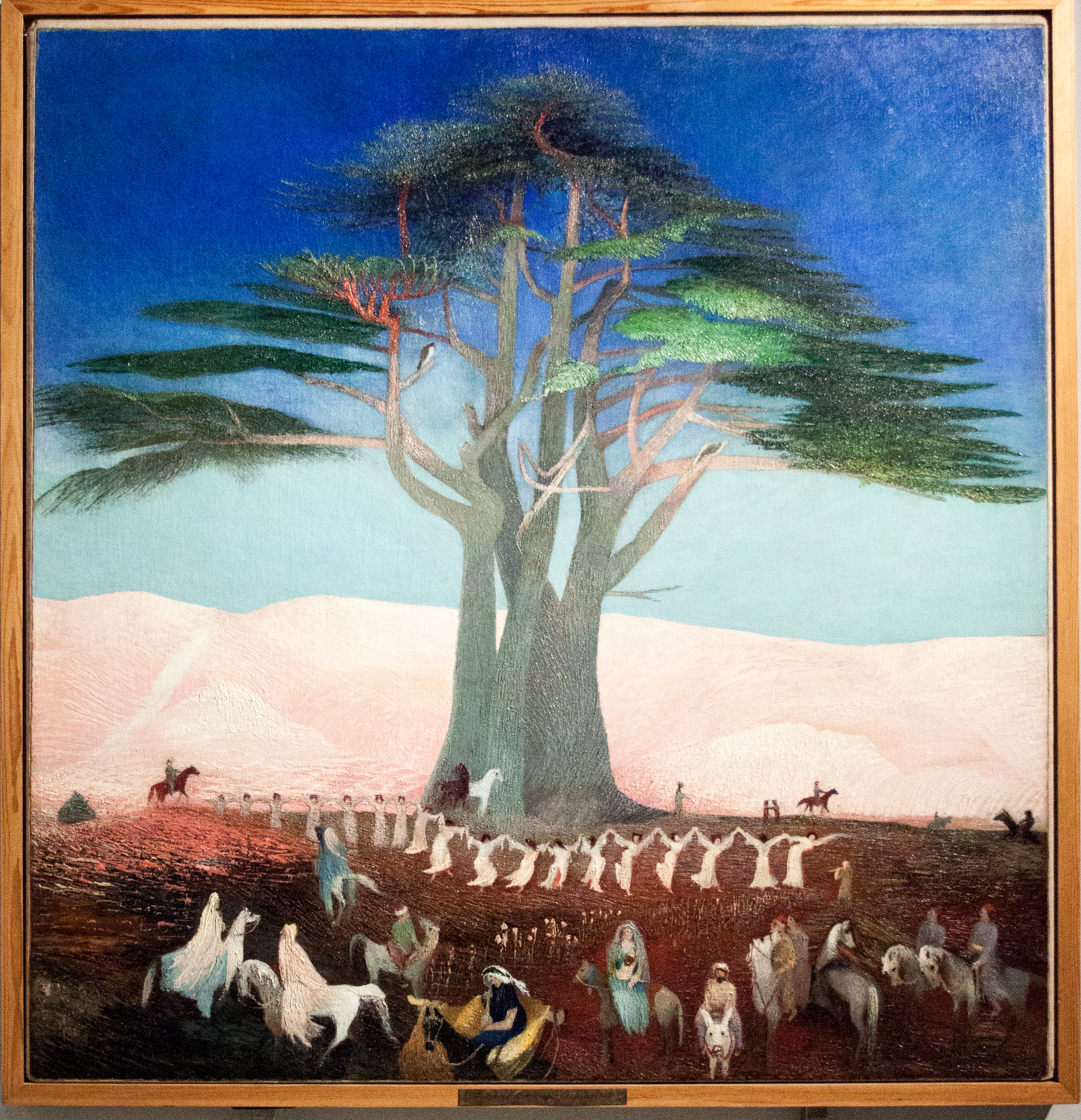
'Pilgrimage to the Cedars of Libanon' – painting by a Hungarian painter, Csontváry Kosztka Tivadar

In ancient times, Lebanon was covered by large forests of cedar trees, the national emblem of the country. Millennia of deforestation have altered the hydrology in Mount Lebanon and changed the regional climate adversely. As of 2012, forests covered 13.4% of the Lebanese land area; they are under constant threat from wildfires caused by the long dry summer season.

As a result of longstanding exploitation, few old cedar trees remain in pockets of forests in Lebanon, but there is an active program to conserve and regenerate the forests. The Lebanese approach has emphasized natural regeneration over planting by creating the right conditions for germination and growth. The Lebanese state has created several nature reserves that contain cedars, including the Shouf Biosphere Reserve, the Jaj Cedar Reserve, the Tannourine Reserve, the Ammouaa and Karm Shbat Reserves in the Akkar district, and the Forest of the Cedars of God near Bsharri. Lebanon had a 2019 Forest Landscape Integrity Index mean score of 3.76/10, ranking it 141st globally out of 172 countries.

In 2010, the Environment Ministry set a 10-year plan to increase the national forest coverage by 20%, which is equivalent to the planting of two million new trees each year. The plan, which was funded by the United States Agency for International Development (USAID), and implemented by the U.S. Forest Service (USFS), through the Lebanon Reforestation Initiative (LRI), was inaugurated in 2011 by planting cedar, pine, wild almond, juniper, fir, oak and other seedlings, in ten regions around Lebanon. As of 2016, forests covered 13.6% of Lebanon, and other wooded lands represented a further 11%. Since 2011, over 600,000 trees, including cedars and other native species, have been planted throughout the country as part of the Lebanon Reforestation Initiative (LRI).

Lebanon contains two terrestrial ecoregions: Eastern Mediterranean conifer–sclerophyllous–broadleaf forests and Southern Anatolian montane conifer and deciduous forests.

Beirut and Mount Lebanon have been facing a severe garbage crisis. After the closure of the Bourj Hammoud dump in 1997, the al-Naameh dumpsite was opened by the government in 1998. The al-Naameh dumpsite was planned to contain 2 million tons of waste for a limited period of six years at the most. It was designed to be a temporary solution, while the government would have devised a long-term plan. Sixteen years later al-Naameh was still open and exceeded its capacity by 13 million tons. In July 2015 the residents of the area, already protesting in the recent years, forced the closure of the dumpsite. The inefficiency of the government, as well as the corruption inside of the waste management company Sukleen in charge of managing the garbage in Lebanon, have resulted in piles of garbage blocking streets in Mount Lebanon and Beirut.

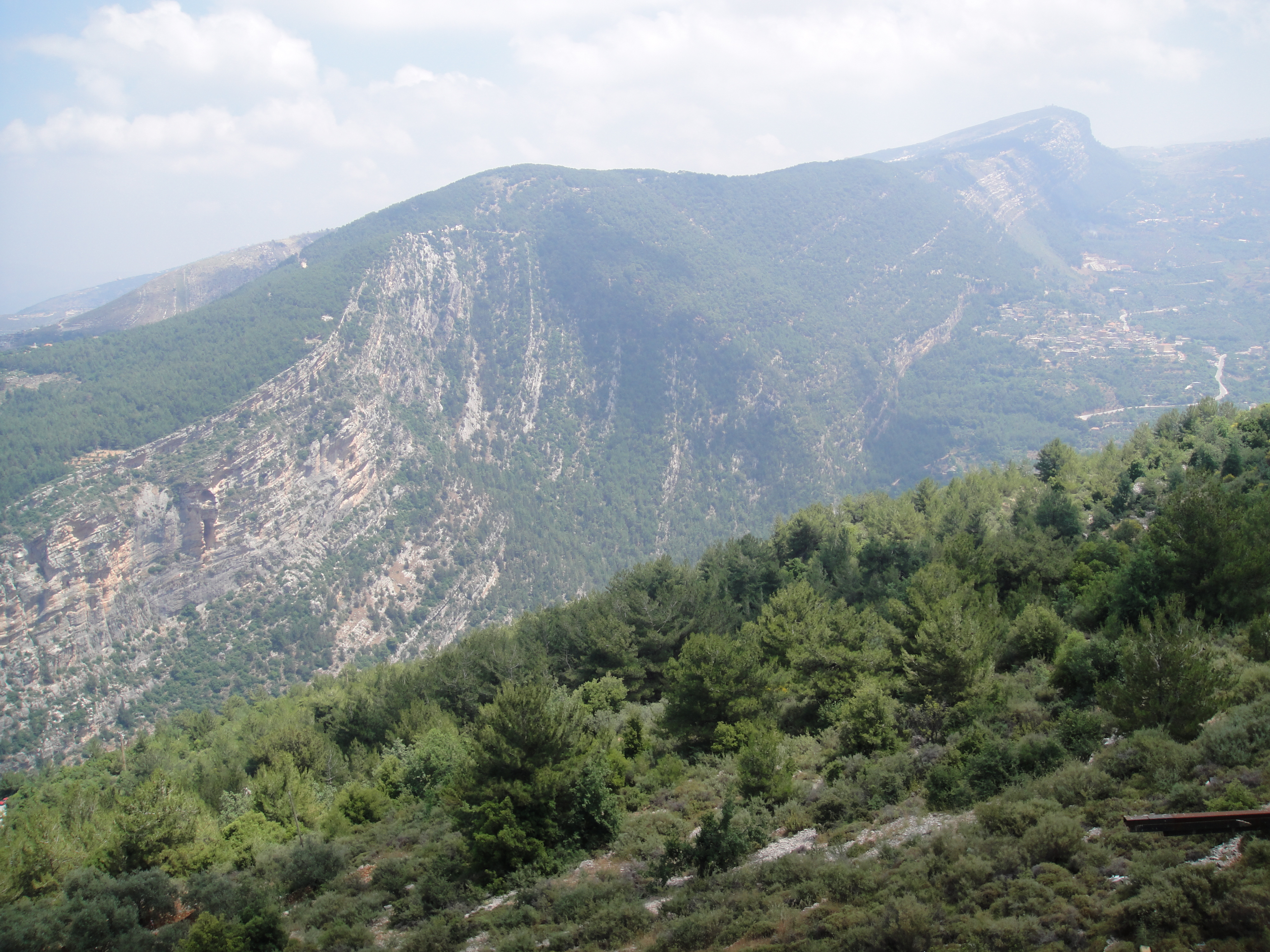
Mount Lebanon is a mountain range in Lebanon. It averages above 2,500 m (8,200 ft) in elevation.

In December 2015, the Lebanese government signed an agreement with Chinook Industrial Mining, part owned by Chinook Sciences, to export over 100,000 tons of untreated waste from Beirut and the surrounding area. The waste had accumulated in temporary locations following the government closure of the county's largest land fill site five months earlier. The contract was jointly signed with Howa International which has offices in the Netherlands and Germany. The contract is reported to cost $212 per ton. The waste, which is compacted and infectious, would have to be sorted and was estimated to be enough to fill 2,000 containers. Initial reports that the waste was to be exported to Sierra Leone have been denied by diplomats.

In February 2016, the government withdrew from negotiations after it was revealed that documents relating to the export of the trash to Russia were forgeries. On 19 March 2016, the Cabinet reopened the Naameh landfill for 60 days in line with a plan it passed a few days earlier to end the trash crisis. The plan also stipulates the establishment of landfills in Bourj Hammoud and Costa Brava, east and south of Beirut respectively. Sukleen trucks began removing piled garbage from Karantina and heading to Naameh. Environment Minister Mohammad Machnouk announced during a chat with activists that over 8,000 tons of garbage had been collected up to that point in only 24 hours as part of the government's trash plan. The plan's execution was ongoing at last report. In 2017, Human Rights Watch found that Lebanon's garbage crisis, and open burning of waste in particular, was posing a health risk to residents and violating the state's obligations under international law.

In September 2018, Lebanon's parliament passed a law that banned open dumping and burning of waste. Despite penalties set in case of violations, Lebanese municipalities have been openly burning the waste, putting the lives of people in danger. In October 2018, Human Rights Watch researchers witnessed the open burning of dumps in al-Qantara and Qabrikha. On Sunday 13 October 2019 at night, a series of about 100 forest fires according to Lebanese Civil Defense, broke out and spread over large areas of Lebanon's forests. Lebanese Prime Minister Saad Al-Hariri confirmed his contact with a number of countries to send assistance via helicopters and firefighting planes, Cyprus, Jordan, Turkey and Greece participated in firefighting. According to press reports on Tuesday (15 October), fire has decreased in different places due to the rains. Lebanon's ongoing economic crisis has precipitated electricity shortages, prompting an increased reliance on diesel generators and subsequently contributing to environmental deterioration and health hazards. The scarcity of power has led to a heightened contamination of water sources. The compromised infrastructure, marked by sewage infiltrating drinking water, has given rise to significant health concerns, including an increase in cases of Hepatitis A. The health service, grappling with workforce shortages due to emigration, struggles amid a growing public health crisis.

== Government and politics ==
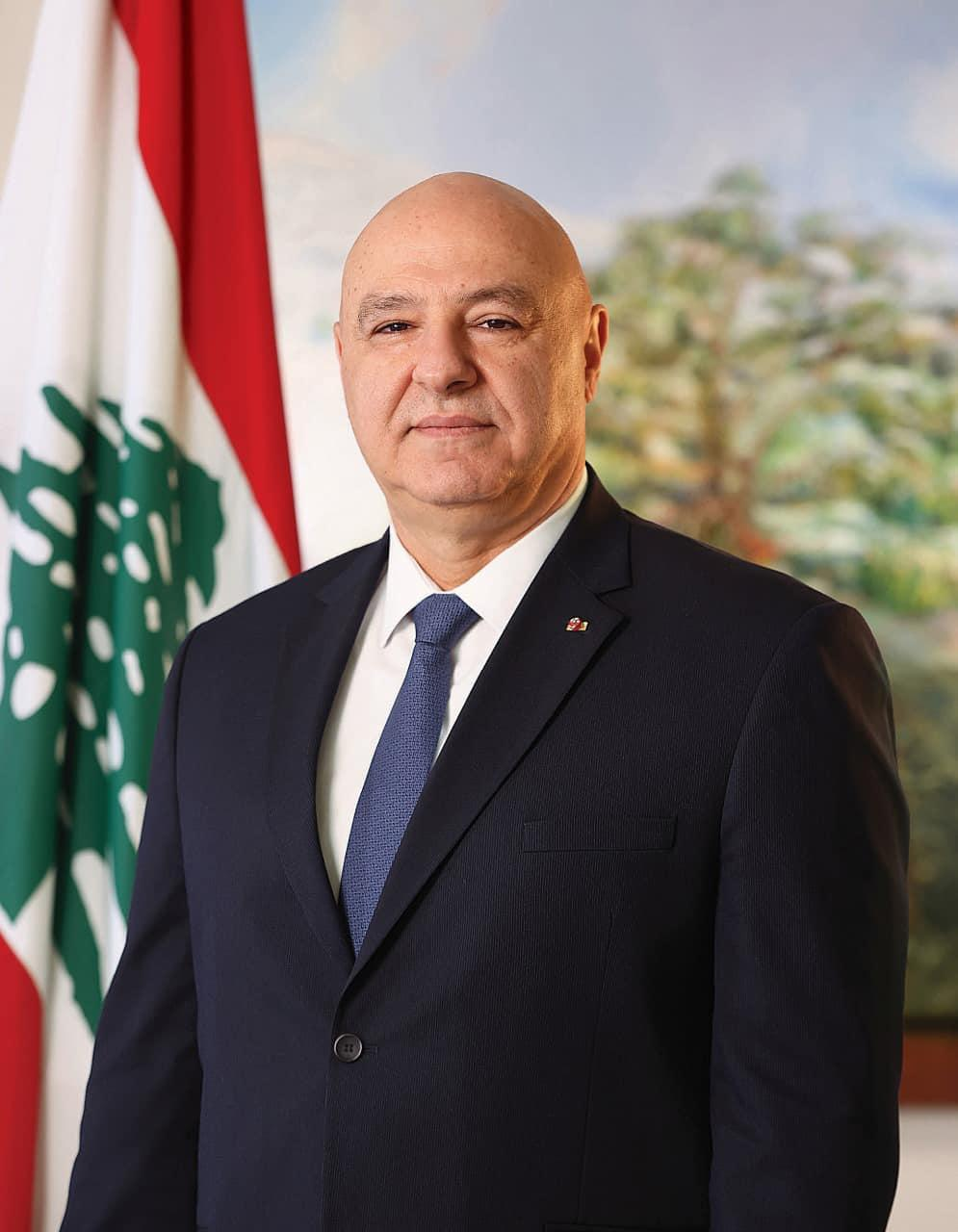
Joseph Aoun
President

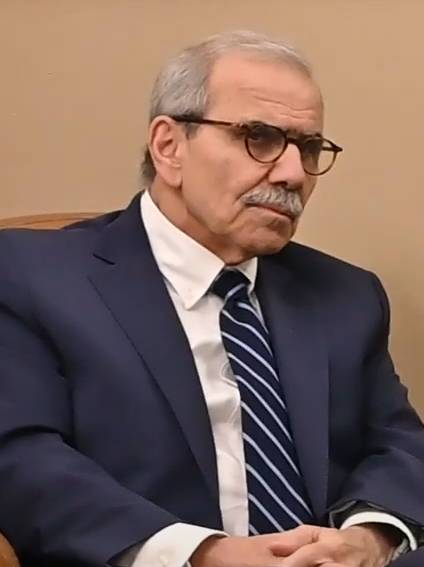
Nawaf Salam
Prime Minister

Lebanon is a parliamentary democracy that includes confessionalism. The National Pact, erected in 1943, laid out a governing arrangement intended to harmonize the interests of the country's major religious groups. The president has to be a Maronite Christian, the prime minister a Sunni Muslim, the speaker of the Parliament a Shi'a Muslim, the deputy prime minister and the deputy speaker of Parliament Eastern Orthodox. This system is intended to deter sectarian conflict and to represent fairly the demographic distribution of the 18 recognized religious groups in government.

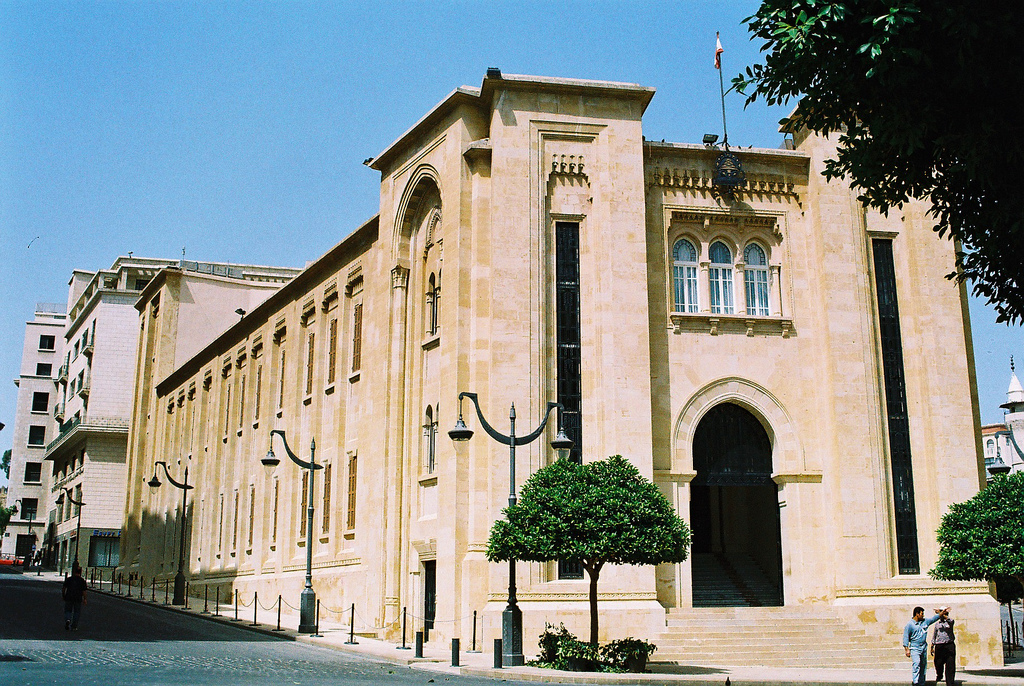
The Lebanese Parliament building at the Place de l'Étoile

Until 1975, Freedom House considered Lebanon to be among only two (together with Israel) politically free countries in the Middle East and North Africa region. The country lost this status with the outbreak of the Civil War, and has not regained it since. Lebanon was rated "Partly Free" in 2013. Even so, Freedom House still ranks Lebanon as among the most democratic nations in the Arab world. According to the V-Dem Democracy indices Lebanon is 2023 the second most electoral democratic country in the Middle East. Until 2005, Palestinians were forbidden to work in over 70 jobs because they did not have Lebanese citizenship. After liberalization laws were passed in 2007, the number of banned jobs dropped to around 20. In 2010, Palestinians were granted the same rights to work as other foreigners in the country. Lebanon's national legislature is the unicameral Parliament of Lebanon. Its 128 seats are divided equally between Christians and Muslims, proportionately between the 18 different denominations and proportionately between its 26 regions. Prior to 1990, the ratio stood at 6:5 in favor of Christians, but the Taif Agreement, which put an end to the 1975–1990 civil war, adjusted the ratio to grant equal representation to followers of the two religions.

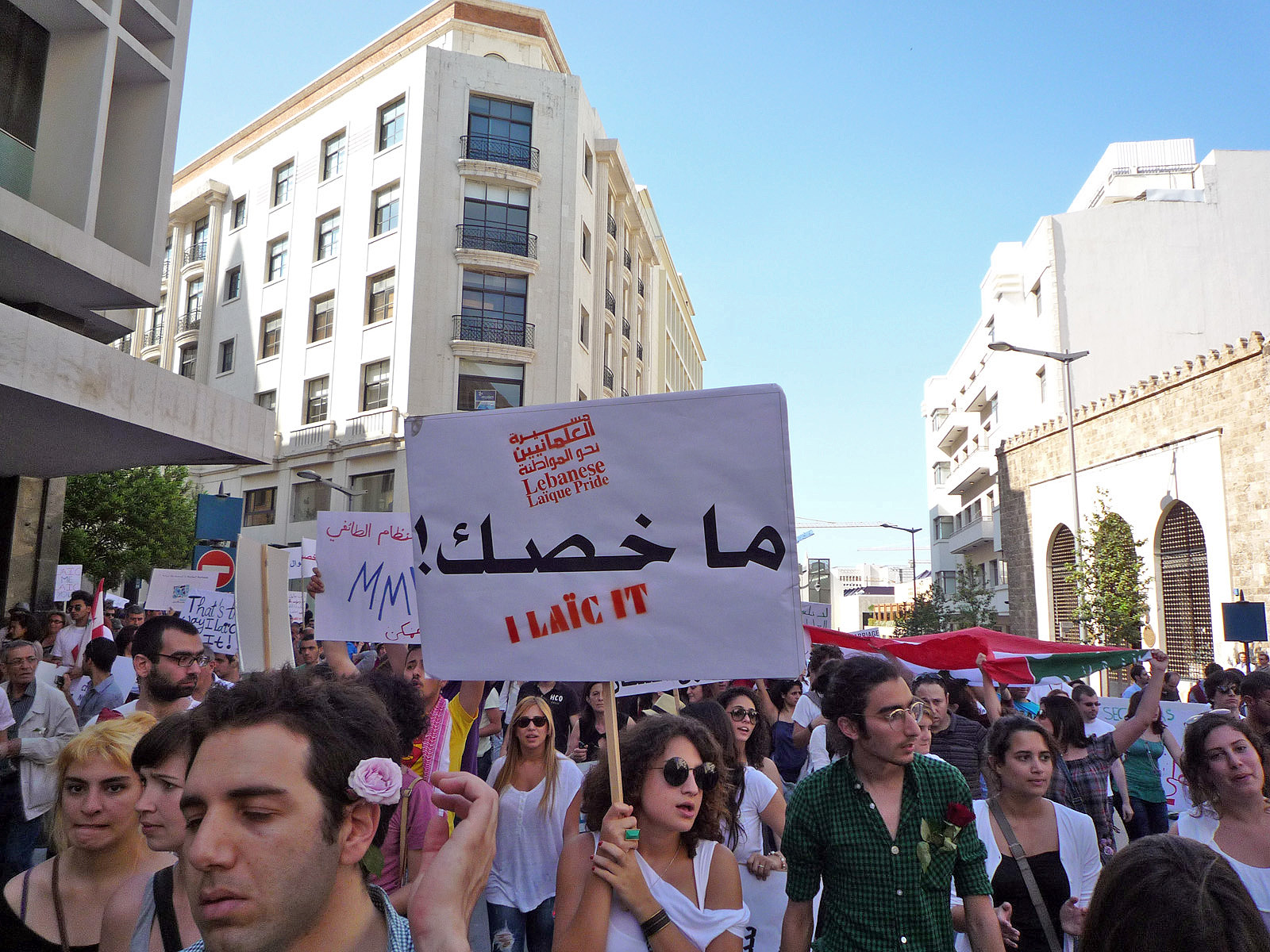
One of many protests in Beirut

The Parliament is elected for a four-year term by popular vote on the basis of sectarian proportional representation. The executive branch consists of the President, the head of state, and the Prime Minister, the head of government. The parliament elects the president for a non-renewable six-year term by a two-thirds majority. The president appoints the Prime Minister, following consultations with the parliament. The president and the prime minister form a cabinet, which must also adhere to the sectarian distribution set out by confessionalism.

In an unprecedented move, the Lebanese parliament has extended its own term twice amid protests, the last being on 5 November 2014, an act which comes in direct contradiction with democracy and article #42 of the Lebanese constitution as no elections have taken place. Lebanon was without a President between May 2014 and October 2016. Nationwide elections were finally scheduled for May 2018. As of August 2019, the Lebanese cabinet included two ministers directly affiliated with Hezbollah, in addition to a close but officially non-member minister. The most recent parliamentary elections were held on 15 May 2022.

=== Administrative divisions ===
Lebanon is divided into nine governorates (muḥāfaẓāt, Arabic: محافظات; singular muḥāfaẓah, Arabic: محافظة) which are further subdivided into twenty-five districts (aqdyah, Arabic: أقضية; singular: qadāʾ Arabic: قضاء). The districts themselves are also divided into several municipalities, each enclosing a group of cities or villages. The governorates and their respective districts are listed below:

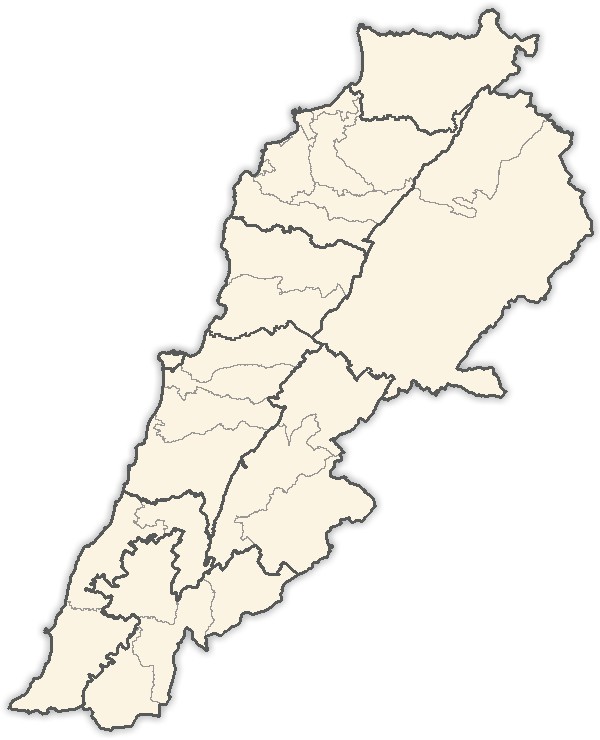

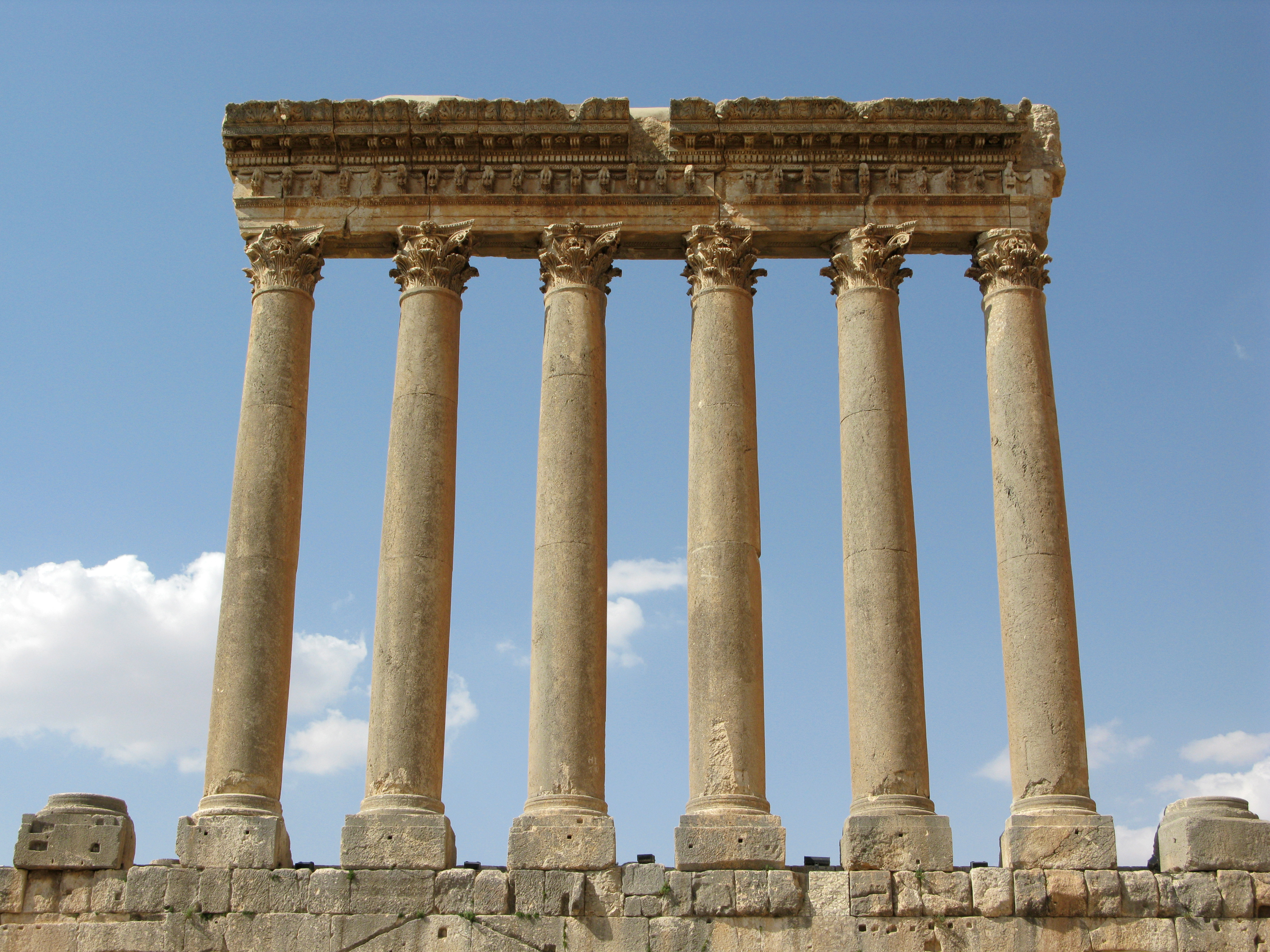
Corinthian capitals of the Temple of Jupiter in Baalbek

- Beirut Governorate
  - Beirut Governorate comprises the city of Beirut and is not divided into districts.
- Akkar Governorate
  - Akkar
- Baalbek-Hermel Governorate
  - Baalbek
  - Hermel
- Beqaa Governorate
  - Rashaya
  - Western Beqaa (al-Beqaa al-Gharbi)
  - Zahle
- Keserwan-Jbeil Governorate
  - Byblos (Jbeil)
  - Keserwan
- Mount Lebanon Governorate (Jabal Lubnan/Jabal Lebnen)
  - Aley
  - Baabda
  - Chouf
  - Matn
- Nabatieh Governorate (Jabal Amel)
  - Bint Jbeil
  - Hasbaya
  - Marjeyoun
  - Nabatieh
- North Governorate (ash-Shamal/shmel)
  - Batroun
  - Bsharri
  - Koura
  - Miniyeh-Danniyeh
  - Tripoli
  - Zgharta
- South Governorate (al-Janoub/Jnub)
  - Jezzine
  - Sidon (Saida)
  - Tyre (Sur)

=== Foreign relations ===
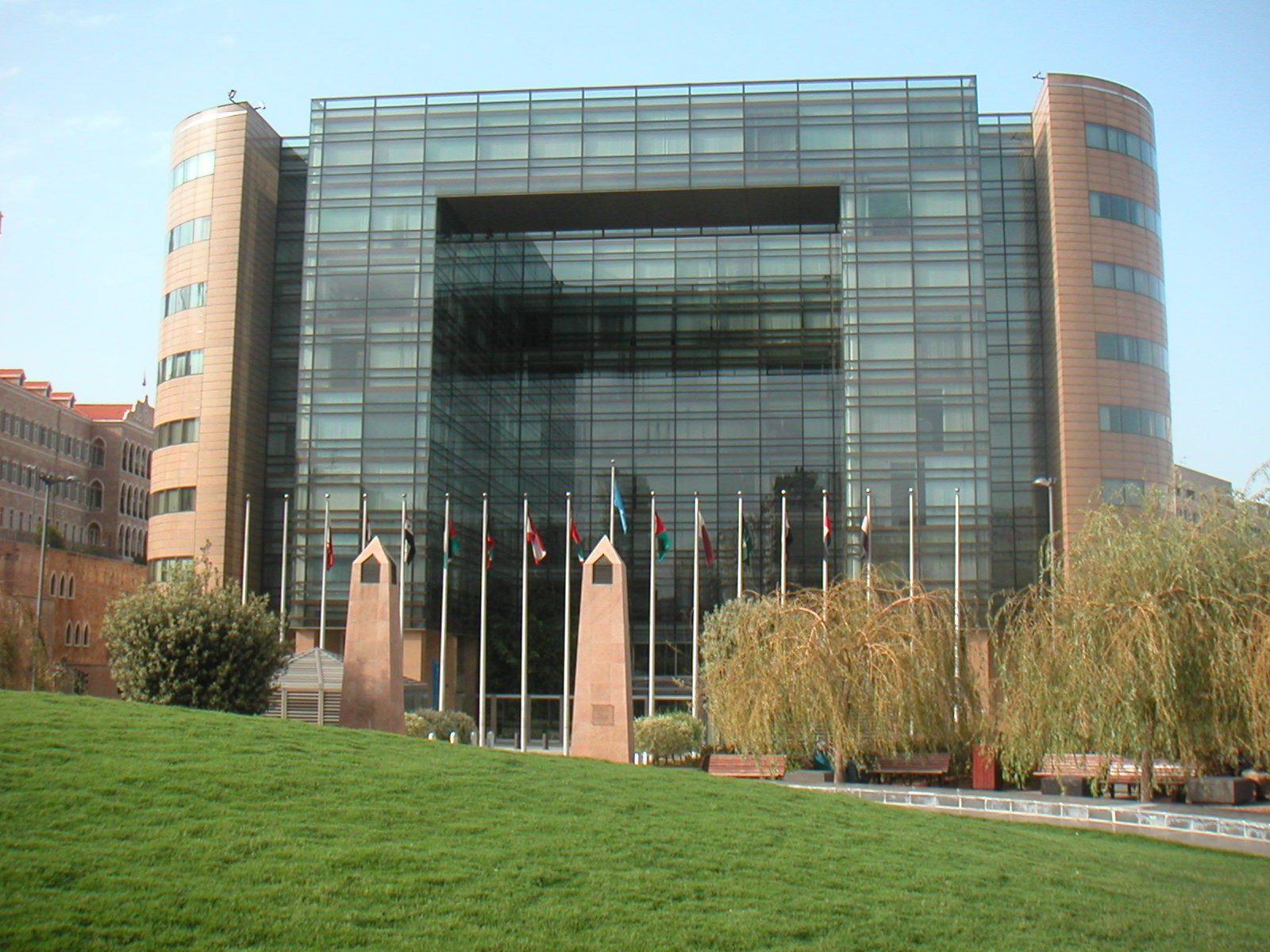
United Nations Lebanon headquarters in Beirut

Lebanon concluded negotiations on an association agreement with the European Union in late 2001, and both sides initialed the accord in January 2002. It is included in the European Union's European Neighbourhood Policy (ENP), which aims at bringing the EU and its neighbours closer. Lebanon also has bilateral trade agreements with several Arab states and is working toward accession to the World Trade Organization.

Lebanon enjoys good relations with virtually all of the other Arab countries (despite historic tensions with Libya and Syria), and hosted an Arab League Summit in March 2002 for the first time in over 35 years. Lebanon is a member of the Francophonie countries and hosted the Francophonie Summit in October 2002 as well as the Jeux de la Francophonie in 2009.

=== Military ===
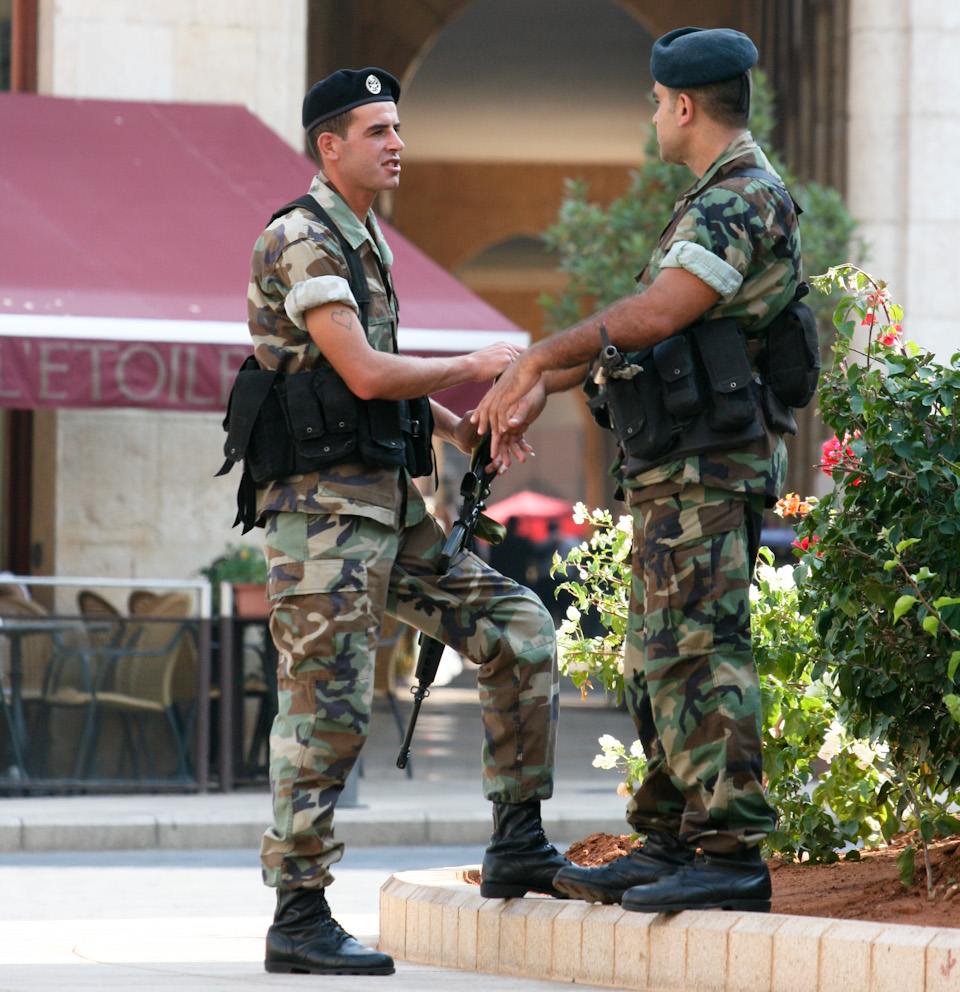
Soldiers of the Lebanese army, 2009

The Lebanese Armed Forces (LAF) has 72,000 active personnel, including 1,100 in the air force, and 1,000 in the navy. The Lebanese Armed Forces' primary missions include defending Lebanon and its citizens against external aggression, maintaining internal stability and security, confronting threats against the country's vital interests, engaging in social development activities, and undertaking relief operations in coordination with public and humanitarian institutions.

Lebanon is a major recipient of foreign military aid. With over $400 million since 2005, it is the second largest per capita recipient of American military aid behind Israel.

The LAF is considered less powerful and influential than Hezbollah in Lebanon. Hezbollah claims to have around 100,000 personnel, including 20,000 active fighters and 20,000 in reserves and is supplied with advanced weaponry, including rockets and drones from Iran. It possesses "a larger arsenal of artillery than most nations enjoy." A report from the Center for Strategic and International Studies in 2018 called it "the world's most heavily armed non-state actor." In June 2024, experts estimated that Hezbollah had 150,000–200,000 rockets and missiles of various ranges.

Hezbollah effectively controls large portions of southern Lebanon, and has greater military strength than the Lebanese armed forces. The government of Lebanon has been unable or unwilling to prevent Hezbollah attacks on Israel, and violent conflict between Israel and Hezbollah in southern Lebanon. Many Islamist and Palestinian militias operate in refugee camps because of an agreement that prevents the Lebanese Army from entering them. Many people wanted by the Lebanese government are believed to have taken refuge in the camp as a result of the lack of Lebanese authority.

=== Law ===
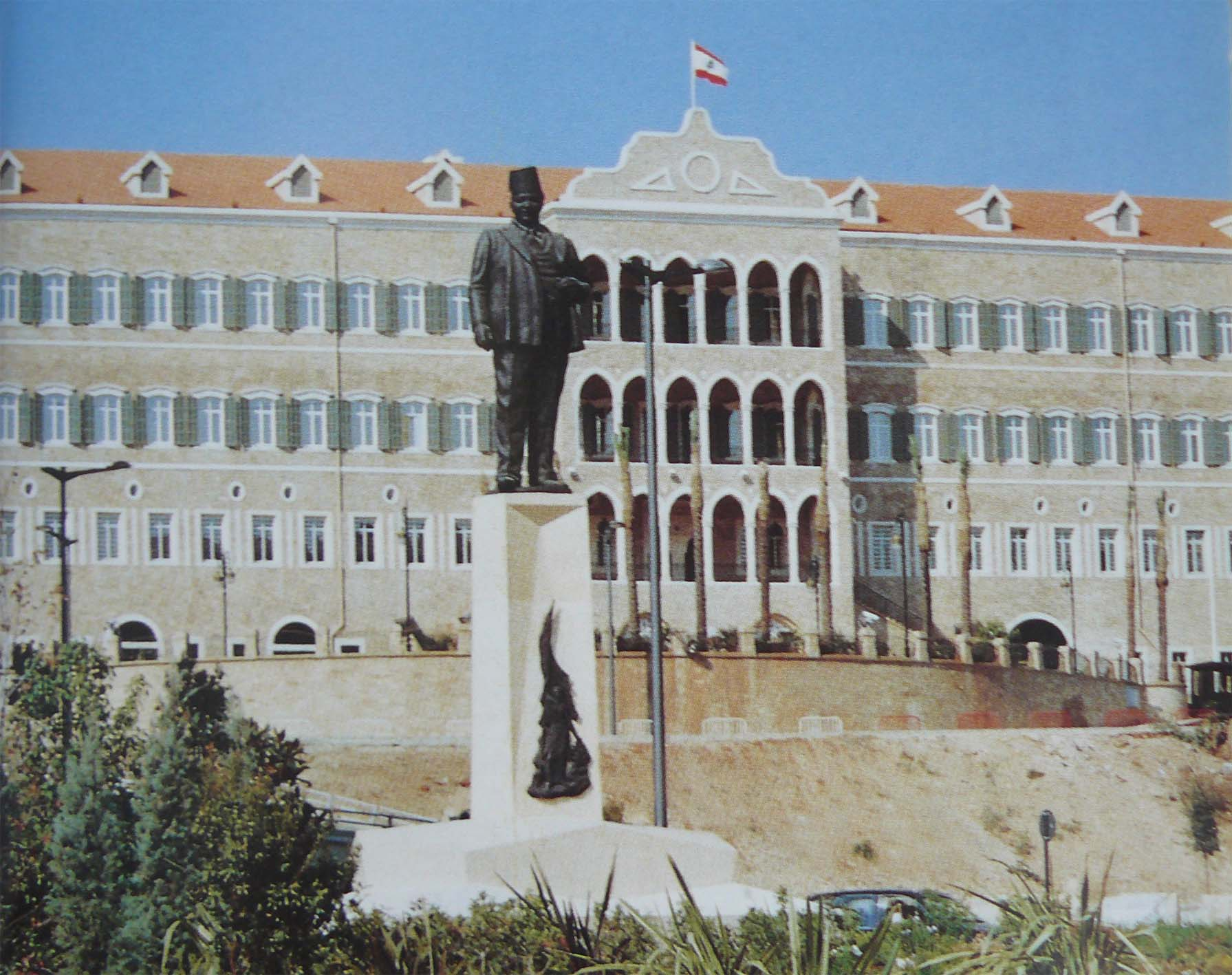
Grand Serail from Riad El Solh Square, Beirut

There are 18 officially recognized religious groups in Lebanon, each with its own family law legislation and set of religious courts. The Lebanese legal system is based on the French system, and is a civil law country, with the exception for matters related to personal status (succession, marriage, divorce, adoption, etc.), which are governed by a separate set of laws designed for each sectarian community. For instance, the Islamic personal status laws are inspired by the Sharia law. For Muslims, these tribunals deal with questions of marriage, divorce, custody, and inheritance and wills. For non-Muslims, personal status jurisdiction is split: the law of inheritance and wills falls under national civil jurisdiction, while Christian and Jewish religious courts are competent for marriage, divorce, and custody. Catholics can additionally appeal before the Vatican Rota court.

The most notable set of codified laws is the Code des Obligations et des Contrats promulgated in 1932 and equivalent to the French Civil Code. Capital punishment was abolished in 2026; Lebanon is the only Arab country to not retain the death penalty. The Lebanese court system consists of three levels: courts of first instance, courts of appeal, and the court of cassation. The Constitutional Council rules on constitutionality of laws and electoral frauds. There also is a system of religious courts having jurisdiction over personal status matters within their own communities, with rules on matters such as marriage and inheritance.

In 1990, article 95 was amended to provide that the parliament shall take necessary measures to abolish political structure based on religious affiliation, but that until such time only the highest positions in public civil service, including the judiciary, military, security forces, public and mixed institutions, shall be divided equally between Christians and Muslims without regard to the denominational affiliation within each community.

In August 2026, the government of Lebanon abolished the death penalty.

==== LGBT rights ====
Male homosexuality is illegal in Lebanon. Discrimination against LGBTQ people in Lebanon is widespread. According to 2019 survey by the Pew Research Center, 85% of Lebanese respondents believe that homosexuality should not be accepted by society.

A gender and sexuality conference, held annually in Lebanon, since 2013, was moved abroad in 2019 after a religious group on Facebook called for the organizers' arrest and the cancellation of the conference for "inciting immorality." General Security Forces shut down the 2018 conference and indefinitely denied non-Lebanese LGBT activists who attended the conference permission to re-enter the country.

== Economy ==
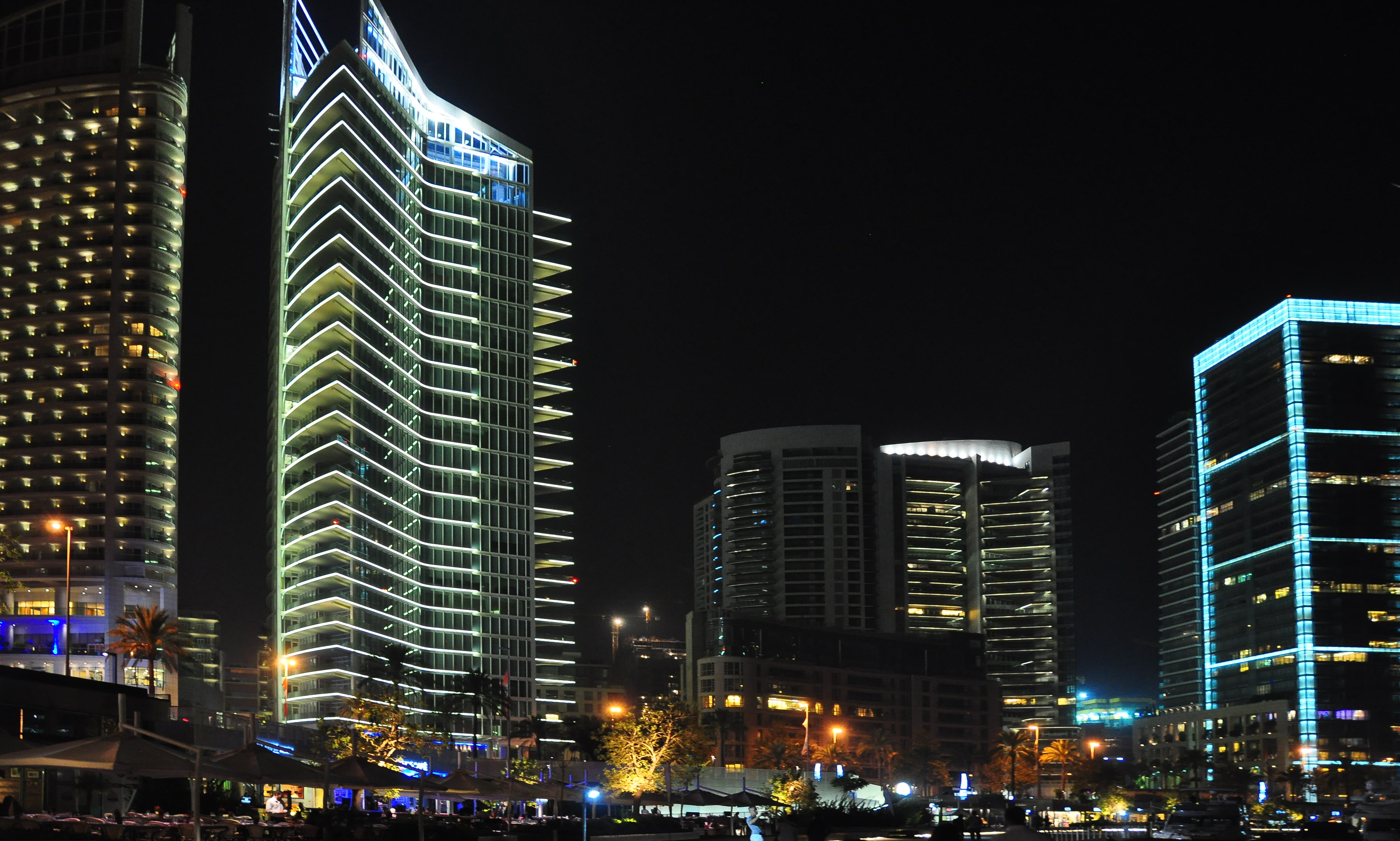
Beirut Central District

Lebanon's constitution states that 'the economic system is free and ensures private initiative and the right to private property'. Lebanon's economy follows a laissez-faire model. Most of the economy is dollarized, and the country has no restrictions on the movement of capital across its borders. The Lebanese government's intervention in foreign trade is minimal. The Investment Development Authority of Lebanon was established with the aim of promoting investment in Lebanon. In 2001, Investment Law No.360 was enacted to reinforce the organisation's mission.

As of 2026, Lebanon was suffering a severe economic crisis. As of 2024, the GDP has shrunk by 40% compared with 2017, and the exchange rate against the USD increased by more than 60 times. The 2025 annual inflation rate is 14.6%, and the monthly minimum wage equivalent to approximately $313. According to the United Nations, three out of every four Lebanese individuals fall below the poverty line. The crisis stems from a long-term Ponzi scheme by the Central Bank of Lebanon, borrowing dollars at high interest rates to sustain deficits and maintain a currency peg. By 2019, insufficient new deposits led to an unsustainable situation, resulting in weeks-long bank closures, arbitrary capital controls, and ultimately, the country's default in 2020.

Throughout the Ottoman and French mandatory periods and into the 1960s, Lebanon experienced prosperity, serving as a hub for banking, financial services, and a key distribution center for the Middle East. The local economy thrived with a foundation in industries related to food processing, clothing, jewelry, and carpets. This prosperity was later marred by four decades of conflict. Following the end of the civil war, Lebanon has developed a service-based economy centered around finance, real estate, and tourism. Nearly 65% of the Lebanese workforce attain employment in the services sector. The GDP contribution, accordingly, amounts to roughly 67.3% of the annual Lebanese GDP. However, dependence on the tourism and banking sectors leaves the economy vulnerable to political instability.

The urban population in Lebanon is noted for its commercial enterprise. Emigration has yielded Lebanese "commercial networks" throughout the world. In 2008, Remittances from Lebanese abroad totalled $8.2 billion and account for one-fifth of the country's economy. In 2005, Lebanon had the largest proportion of skilled labor among Arab States.

=== Agriculture ===
The agricultural sector in Lebanon employs 20–25% of the total workforce, and contributed 3.1% to the country's GDP, as of 2020. Lebanon has the highest proportion of cultivable land in the Arab world. Major crops include apples, peaches, oranges, and lemons. A significant portion of the country's factories, approximately one-third, is dedicated to producing packaged food items, ranging from poultry to pickles. However, despite favorable conditions for farming and diverse microclimates, the country depends on food imports, constituting 80% of its consumption. This is mainly attributed to the small scale of many farms, preventing the benefits of economies of scale. The ongoing economic crisis and devaluation of the Lebanese pound have also negatively impacted the agricultural sector, particularly through elevated costs for essential imports such as seeds and fertilizers. This economic strain compounds existing burdens for farmers, including escalating debts and inefficient agricultural practices. Consequently, farmers are observing a decline in revenues and encountering difficulties in meeting loan repayment obligations.

The commodities market in Lebanon includes substantial gold coin production, however according to International Air Transport Association (IATA) standards, they must be declared upon exportation to any foreign country.

=== Manufacturing and industry ===
Industry in Lebanon is mainly limited to small businesses that reassemble and package imported parts. In 2004, industry ranked second in workforce, with 26% of the Lebanese working population, and second in GDP contribution, with 21% of Lebanon's GDP.

Oil has recently been discovered inland and in the seabed between Lebanon, Cyprus, Israel and Egypt and talks are underway between Cyprus and Egypt to reach an agreement regarding the exploration of these resources. The seabed separating Lebanon and Cyprus is believed to hold significant quantities of crude oil and natural gas. On 10 May 2013, the Lebanese minister of energy and water clarified that seismic images of the Lebanese sea bed are undergoing detailed explanation of their contents and that up till now, approximately 10% have been covered. Preliminary inspection of the results showed, with over 50% probability, that 10% of Lebanon's exclusive economic zone held up to 660 million barrels of oil and up to 30×10^{12} cu ft of gas.

Lebanon has a significant drug industry, including both production and trade. Western intelligence estimate an annual production of over 4 million pounds of hashish and 20,000 pounds of heroin, generating profits exceeding $4 billion. In recent decades, Hezbollah has intensified its engagement in the drug economy, with narcotics serving as a significant revenue stream for the group. Despite some of the harvest being retained for local use, a significant amount is smuggled worldwide. Despite ongoing efforts, the government's inability to control the drug-producing Beqaa Valley and address illicit Captagon factories allows for the persistent occurrence of drug trades, impacting Lebanon's economy and regional stability.

=== Science and technology ===
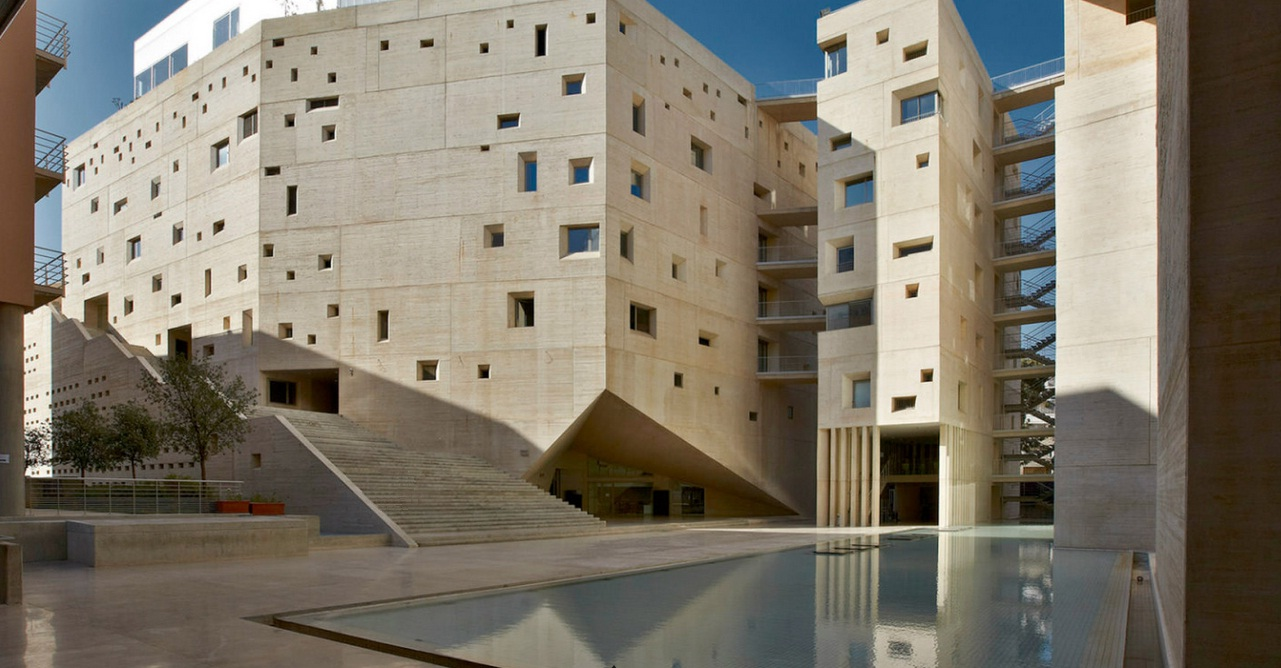
Saint Joseph University of Beirut's Campus of Innovation and Sports on Damascus Street, Beirut

Lebanon was ranked 90th in the Global Innovation Index in 2025. Notable scientists from Lebanon include Hassan Kamel Al-Sabbah, Rammal Rammal, and Edgar Choueiri.

In 1960, a science club from a university in Beirut started a Lebanese space program called "the Lebanese Rocket Society". They achieved great success until 1966 where the program was stopped because of both war and external pressure.

=== Development ===
In the 1950s, GDP growth was the second highest in the world. Despite having no oil reserves, Lebanon, as the Arab world's banking center and among its trading center, had a high national income.

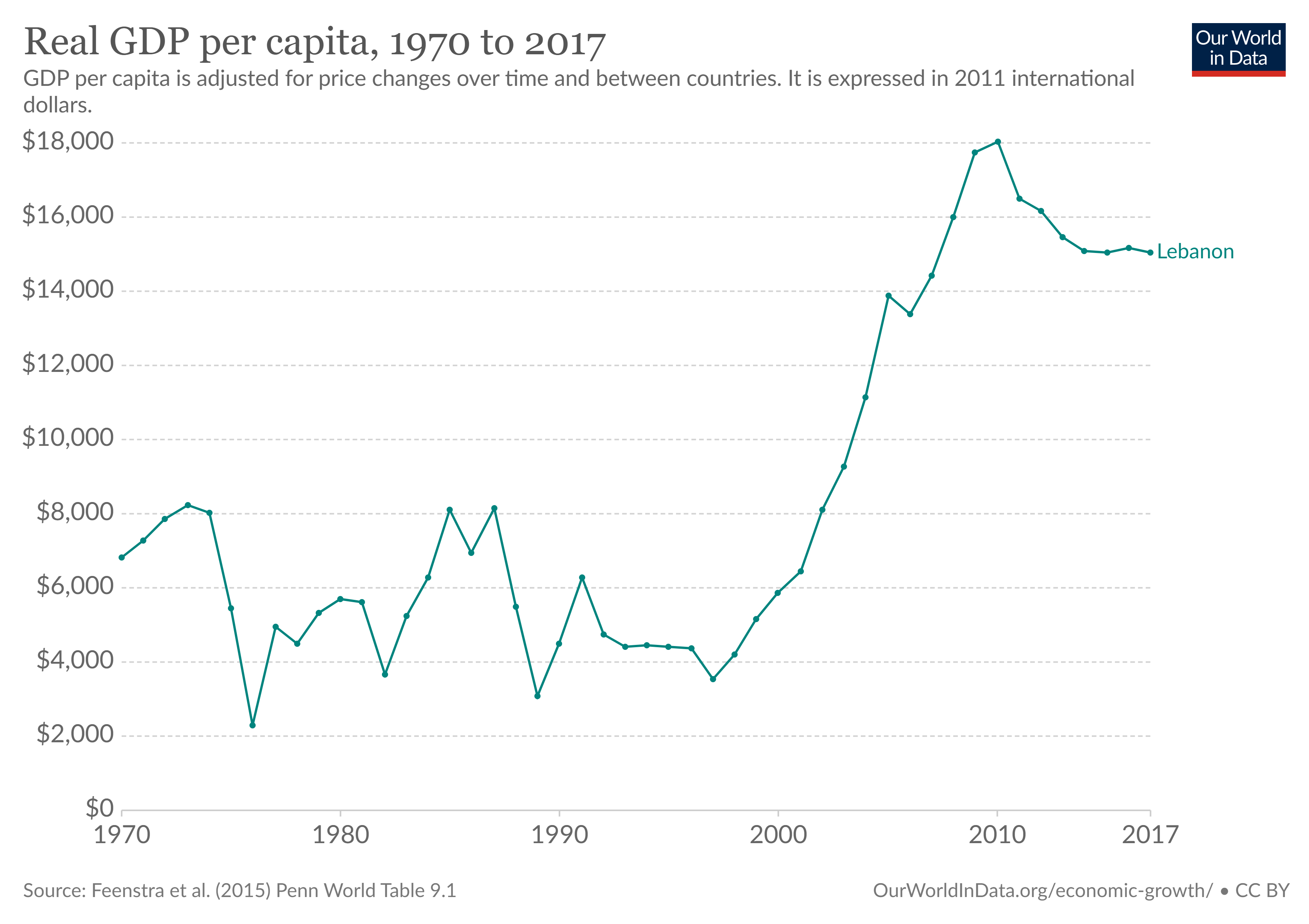
Lebanese real GDP 1970–2017

The 1975–1990 civil war heavily damaged Lebanon's economic infrastructure, cut national output by half, and all but ended Lebanon's position as a West Asian entrepôt and banking hub. The subsequent period of relative peace enabled the central government to restore control in Beirut, begin collecting taxes, and regain access to key port and government facilities. Economic recovery has been helped by a financially sound banking system and resilient small- and medium-scale manufacturers, with family remittances, banking services, manufactured and farm exports, and international aid as the main sources of foreign exchange.

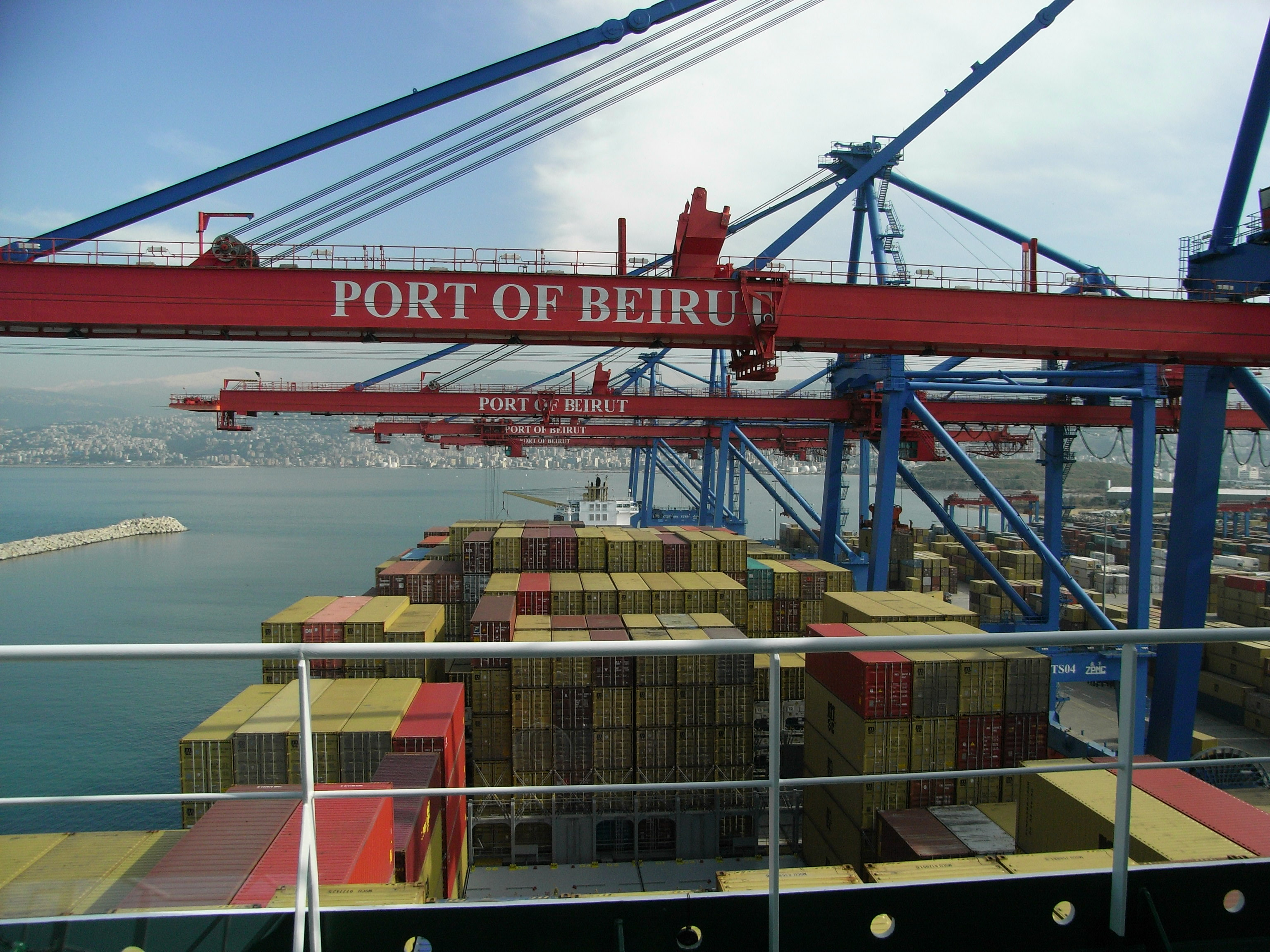
Port of Beirut

Until July 2006, Lebanon enjoyed considerable stability, Beirut's reconstruction was almost complete, and increasing numbers of tourists poured into the nation's resorts. The economy witnessed growth, with bank assets reaching over 75 billion US dollars. Market capitalization was also at an all-time high, estimated at $10.9 billion at the end of the second quarter of 2006. The month-long 2006 war severely damaged Lebanon's fragile economy, especially the tourism sector. According to a preliminary report published by the Lebanese Ministry of Finance on 30 August 2006, a major economic decline was expected as a result of the fighting.

Over the course of 2008 Lebanon rebuilt its infrastructure mainly in the real estate and tourism sectors, resulting in a comparatively robust post war economy. Major contributors to the reconstruction of Lebanon include Saudi Arabia (with US$1.5 billion pledged), the European Union (with about $1 billion) and a few other Persian Gulf countries with contributions of up to $800 million.

=== Tourism ===
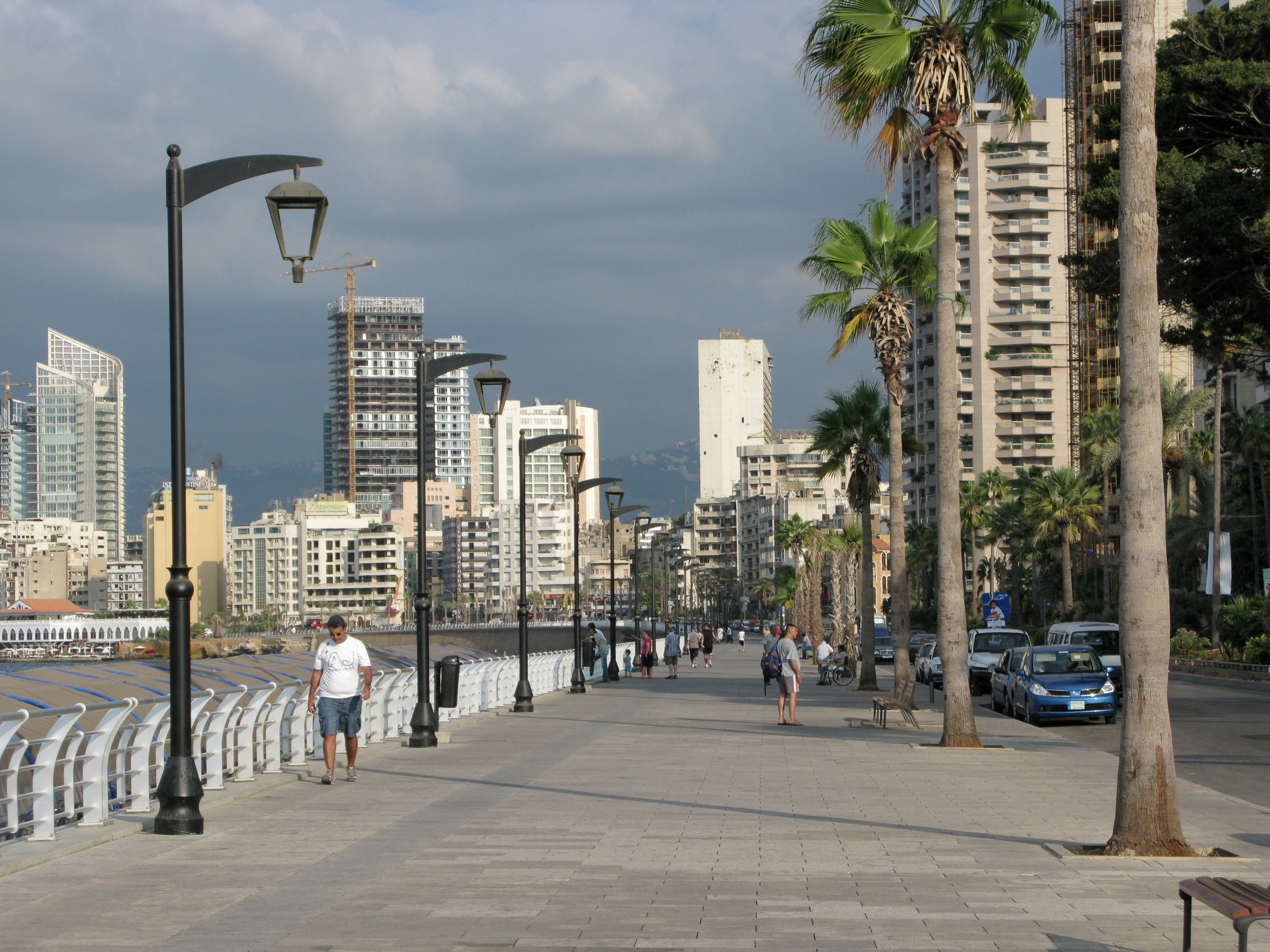
Beirut is the tourism hub of the country.

The tourism industry accounts for about 10% of GDP. Lebanon attracted around 1,333,000 tourists in 2008, thus placing it as 79th out of 191 countries. In 2009, The New York Times ranked Beirut the No. 1 travel destination worldwide due to its nightlife and hospitality. In January 2010, the Ministry of Tourism announced that 1,851,081 tourists had visited Lebanon in 2009, a 39% increase from 2008. In 2009, Lebanon hosted the largest number of tourists to date, eclipsing the previous record set before the Lebanese Civil War. Tourist arrivals reached two million in 2010, but fell by 37% for the first 10 months of 2012, a decline caused by the war in neighbouring Syria.

In 2011, Saudi Arabia, Jordan, and Japan were the three most popular origin countries of foreign tourists to Lebanon. In summer, a considerable number of visitors to Lebanon consists of Lebanese expatriates coming to visit their hometowns. In 2012, it was reported that an influx of Japanese tourists had caused a rise in popularity of Japanese cuisine in Lebanon.

On 4 May, the United Arab Emirates (UAE) has announced that it will lift its travel ban on Lebanon, effective 7 May 2025. This decision follows a meeting between Lebanese President Joseph Aoun and UAE President Sheikh Mohamed bin Zayed in Abu Dhabi, during which both leaders agreed to facilitate travel and improve movement between the two countries.

== Demographics ==
Lebanon had an estimated population of 5,592,631 in 2021, with the number of Lebanese nationals estimated at 4,680,212 in July; however, no official census has been conducted since 1932 due to the sensitive confessional political balance between Lebanon's various religious groups. Identifying all Lebanese as ethnically Arab is a widely employed example of panethnicity, as the Lebanese "are descended from many different peoples who are either indigenous, or have occupied, invaded, or settled this corner of the world", making Lebanon, "a mosaic of closely interrelated cultures". (Note: Some Phoenicianist activists are known to oppose being characterized as Arab, but from a statistical perspective are often counted as such.)

The fertility rate fell from 5.00 in 1971 to 1.75 in 2004. Fertility rates vary considerably among the different religious groups: in 2004, it was 2.10 for Shiites, 1.76 for Sunnis and 1.61 for Maronites.

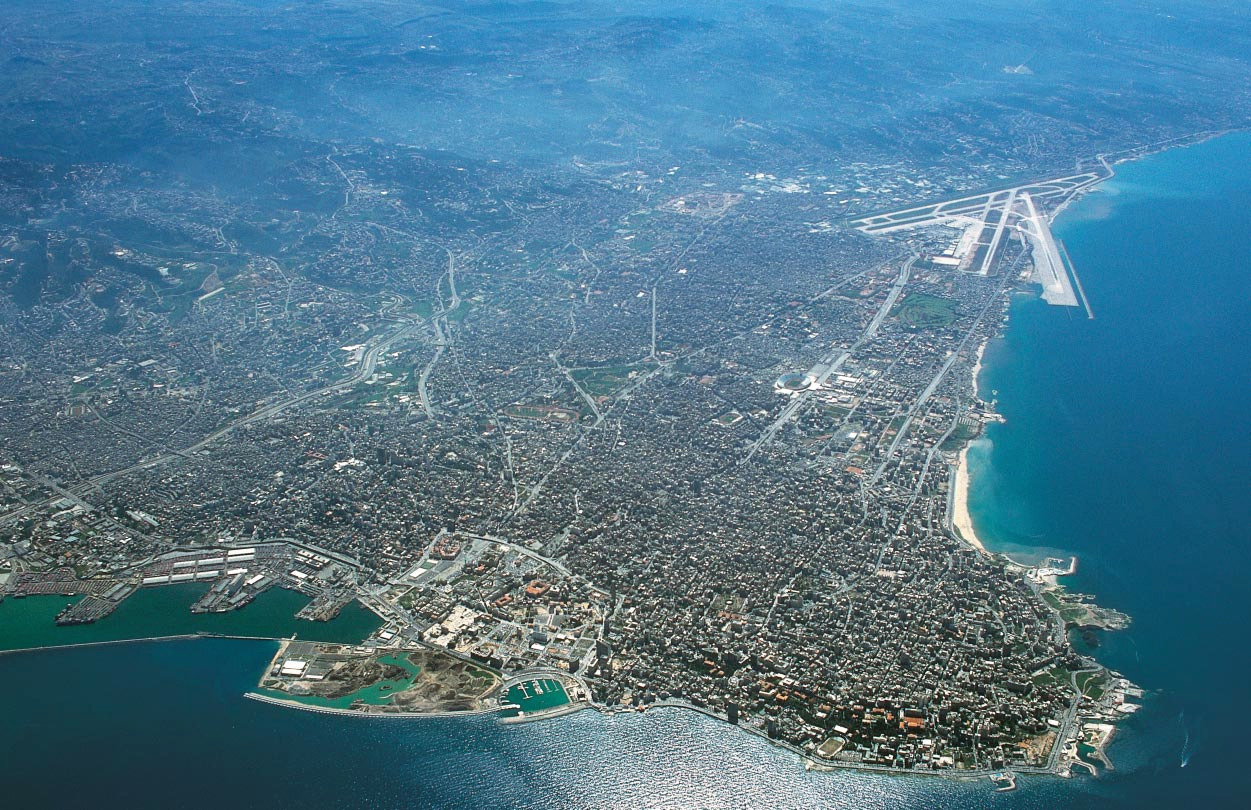
Beirut, located on the Mediterranean Sea, is the most populous city in Lebanon.

Lebanese people have a long history of emigration stretching back to the 19th century; including partial ancestry, more Lebanese live outside the country than in Lebanon itself. The country has experienced a series of migration waves since independence: over 1.8 million people emigrated from the country between 1975 and 2011. Consequently, millions of people of Lebanese descent are spread throughout the world, especially in Latin America; Brazil and Argentina have the largest Lebanese communities, with the former having the largest population in the world, at 5–7 million. North America likewise hosts a large diaspora, particularly in Canada (approximately 250,000–700,000) and the United States (around 2 million). Australia is home to over 270,000 Lebanese.

Large numbers of Lebanese migrated to West Africa, particularly to the Ivory Coast (100,000) and Senegal (30,000). The Persian Gulf hosts many Lebanese expatriates, led by Saudi Arabia with 269,000 Lebanese citizens. Around a third of the Lebanese workforce, about 350,000, reportedly live in Gulf countries according to some sources. Over 50% of the Lebanese diaspora are Christian, partly due to the large period of Christian emigration before 1943.

Lebanon has the largest number of refugees per capita in the world. As of 2024, Lebanon hosted over 1.6 million refugees and asylum seekers: 449,957 from Palestine, 100,000 from Iraq, over 1.1 million from Syria, and at least 4,000 from Sudan. According to the Economic and Social Commission for Western Asia of the United Nations, among the Syrian refugees, 71% live in poverty and 80% lack legal residency. Other estimates put the Syrian refugee population at 1.5 million in 2024, compared to over 1.25 million according to a 2013 estimate by the United Nations.

In the last three decades, lengthy and destructive armed conflicts have ravaged the country. The majority of Lebanese have been affected by armed conflict; those with direct personal experience include 75% of the population, and most others report suffering a range of hardships. In total, almost the entire population (96%) has been affected in some way – either personally or because of the wider consequences of armed conflict.

Largest cities or towns in Lebanon Source?
Rank	Name	Governorate	Pop.	Rank	Name	Governorate	Pop.
1	Beirut	Beirut	1,916,100	11	Nabatieh	Nabatieh	50,000
2	Tripoli	North	1,150,000	12	Zgharta	North	45,000
3	Jounieh	Mount Lebanon	450,000	13	Bint Jbeil	Nabatieh	30,000
4	Zahlé	Beqaa	130,000	14	Bsharri	North	25,000
5	Sidon	South	110,000	15	Baakleen	Mount Lebanon	20,000
6	Aley	Mount Lebanon	100,000
7	Tyre	South	85,000
8	Byblos	Mount Lebanon	80,000
9	Baalbek	Baalbek-Hermel	70,000
10	Batroun	North Governorate	55,000

=== Religion ===
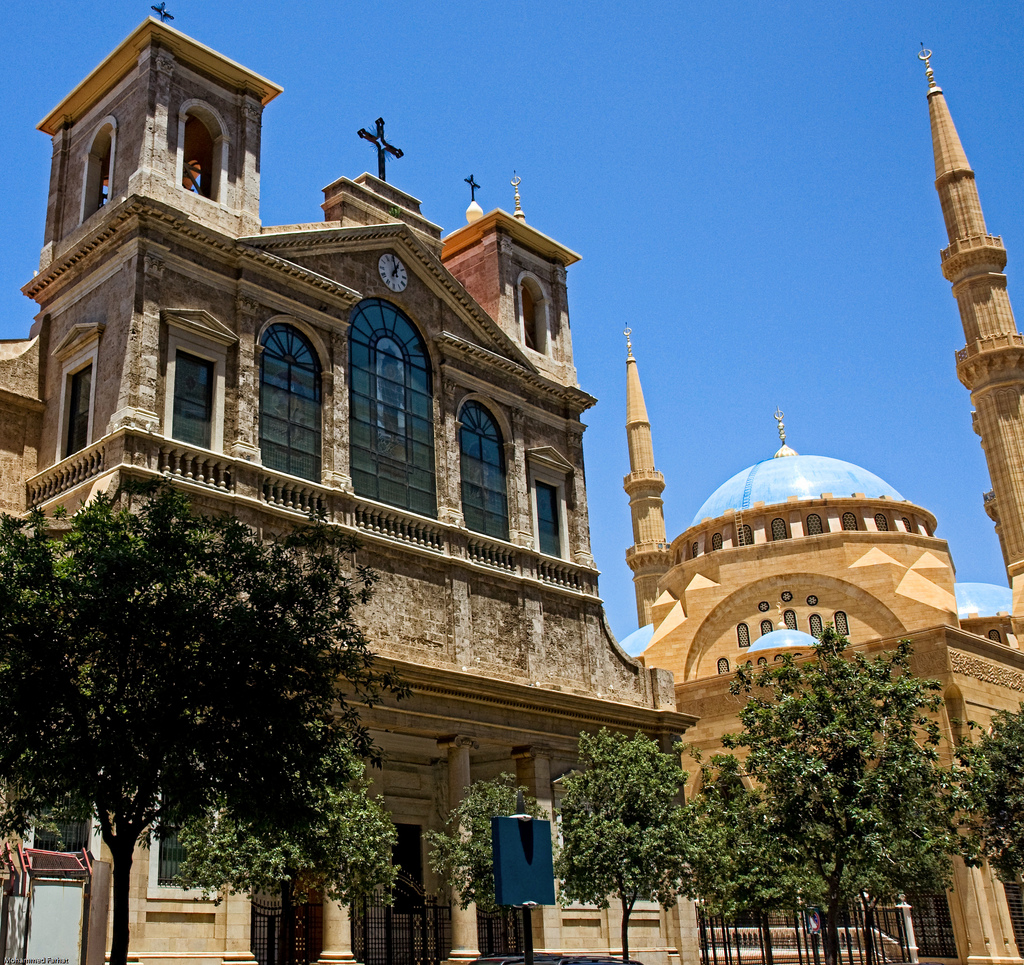
Saint George Maronite Cathedral and the Mohammad Al-Amin Mosque in the capital Beirut.

Distribution of religious groups of Lebanon according to 2009 municipal election data with the boundaries of ancient Mount Lebanon Mutasarrifate marked with a dotted line.

Lebanon is the most religiously diverse country in West Asia and the Mediterranean. Because the relative sizes of different religions and religious sects remains a sensitive issue, a national census has not been conducted since 1932. There are 18 state-recognized religious sects: four Muslim, 12 Christian, one Druze, and one Jewish. The Lebanese government counts its Druze citizens as part of its Muslim population, although most Druze today do not identify as Muslims.

It is believed that there has been a decline in the ratio of Christians to Muslims over the past 60 years, due to higher emigration rates of Christians, and a higher birth rate in the Muslim population. When the last census was held in 1932, Christians made up 53% of Lebanon's population. In 1956, it was estimated that the population was 54% Christian and 44% Muslim.

A demographic study conducted by the research firm Statistics Lebanon found that approximately 27% of the population was Sunni, 27% Shia, 21% Maronite, 8% Greek Orthodox, 5% Druze, 5% Melkite, and 1% Protestant, with the remaining 6% mostly belonging to smaller non-native to Lebanon Christian denominations. The CIA World Factbook estimates (2020) the following (data does not include Lebanon's sizable Syrian and Palestinian refugee populations): Muslim 67.8% (31.9% Sunni, 31.2% Shia, smaller percentages of Alawites and Ismailis), Christian 32.4% (Maronite Catholics are the largest Christian group), Druze 4.5%, and very small numbers of Jews, Baha'is, Buddhists, and Hindus. Other sources like Euronews or the Madrid-based diary La Razón estimate the percentage of Christians to be around 53%. A study based on voter registration numbers shows that by 2011, the Christian population was stable compared to that of previous years, making up 34.35% of the population; Muslims, the Druze included, were 65.47% of the population. The World Values Survey of 2014 put the percentage of atheists in Lebanon at 3.3%. Survey data indicates a decrease in religious faith within Lebanon, especially noticeable among young people.

The Sunni residents primarily live in Western Beirut, the Southern coast of Lebanon, and Northern Lebanon. The Shi'a residents primarily live in Southern Beirut, the Beqaa Valley, and Southern Lebanon. The Maronite Catholic residents primarily live in Eastern Beirut and around Mount Lebanon. The Greek Orthodox residents primarily live in the Koura region, Akkar, Metn, and Beirut (Achrafieh). The Melkite Catholic residents live mainly in Beirut, on the eastern slopes of the Lebanon mountains, and in Zahlé. The Druze residents are concentrated in the rural, mountainous areas east and south of Beirut.

=== Language ===
Article 11 of Lebanon's Constitution states that "Arabic is the official national language. A law determines the cases in which the French language is to be used". The majority of Lebanese people speak Lebanese Arabic, which is grouped in a larger category called Levantine Arabic, while Modern Standard Arabic is mostly used in magazines, newspapers, and formal broadcast media. Lebanese Sign Language is the language of the Deaf community.

There is also significant presence of French, and of English. Almost 40% of Lebanese are considered francophone, and another 15% "partial francophone", and 70% of Lebanon's secondary schools use French as a second language of instruction. By comparison, English is used as a secondary language in 30% of Lebanon's secondary schools. The use of French is a legacy of France's historic ties to the region, including its League of Nations mandate over Lebanon following World War I; as of 2005, some 20% of the population used French on a daily basis. The use of Arabic by Lebanon's educated youth is declining, as they usually prefer to speak in French and, to a lesser extent, English, which are seen as more fashionable.

English is increasingly used in science and business interactions. Lebanese citizens of Armenian, Greek, or Assyrian descent often speak their ancestral languages with varying degrees of fluency. As of 2009, there were around 150,000 Armenians in Lebanon, or around 5% of the population.

=== Education ===
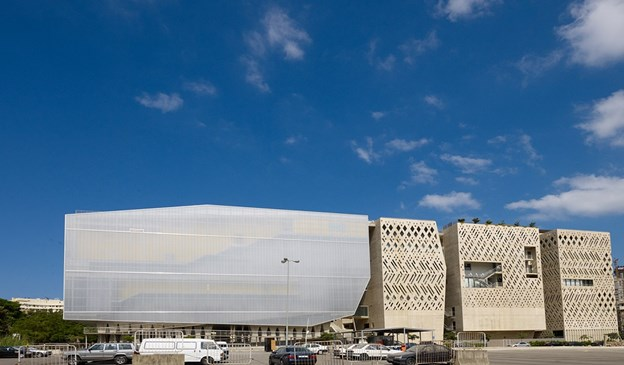
The Innovation and Sports Campus of Saint Joseph University

According to surveys from the World Economic Forum's 2013 Global Information Technology Report, Lebanon has been ranked globally as the fourth best country for math and science education, and as the tenth best overall for quality of education. In quality of management schools, the country was ranked 13th worldwide.

In 2008, the United Nations assigned Lebanon an education index of 0.871. The index, which is determined by the adult literacy rate and the combined primary, secondary, and tertiary gross enrollment ratio, ranked Lebanon 88th out of the 177 countries participating. All Lebanese schools are required to follow a prescribed curriculum designed by the Ministry of Education. Some of the 1,400 private schools offer IB programs, and may add more courses to their curriculum with approval from the Ministry of Education. The first eight years of education are compulsory by law.

Lebanon has forty-one nationally accredited universities, several of which are internationally recognized. The American University of Beirut (AUB) and the Saint Joseph University of Beirut (USJ) were the first Anglophone and the first Francophone universities to open in Lebanon, respectively.

Universities in Lebanon, both public and private, largely operate in French or English. The top-ranking universities in the country are the American University of Beirut (#2 in the Middle East as of 2022 and #226 worldwide), University of Balamand (#17 in the region and #802–850 worldwide), Lebanese American University (#17 in the region and #501 worldwide), Université Saint Joseph de Beyrouth (#2 in Lebanon and #631–640 worldwide), Université Libanaise (#577 worldwide) and Holy Spirit University of Kaslik (#600s worldwide as of 2020). Notre Dame University-Louaize (NDU) (#701 as of 2021).

=== Health ===
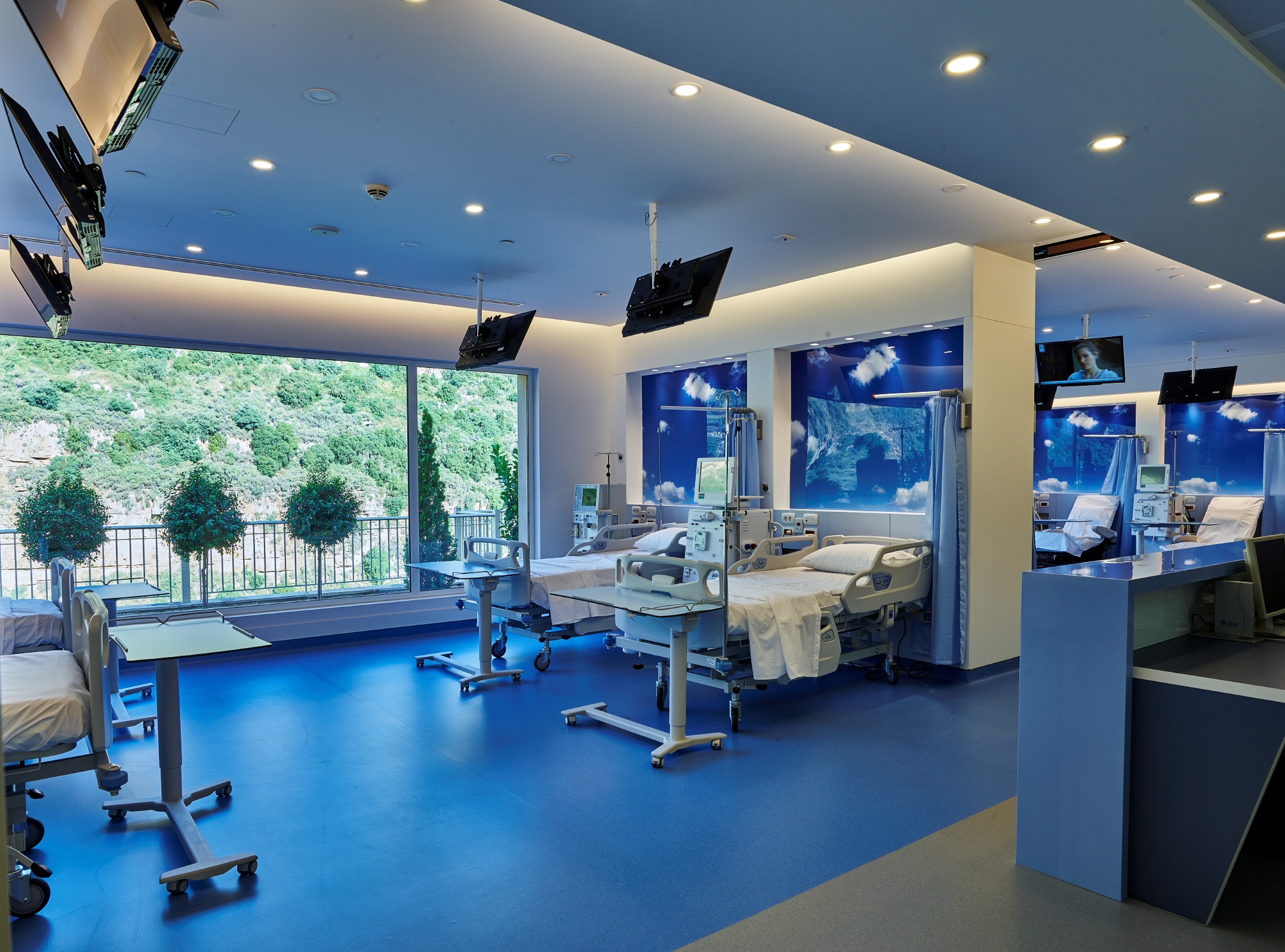
Belluve Medical Center

In 2010, spending on healthcare accounted for 7.03% of Lebanon's GDP. In 2009, there were 31.29 physicians and 19.71 nurses per 10,000 inhabitants. The life expectancy at birth was 72.59 years in 2011, or 70.48 years for males and 74.80 years for females. By the end of the civil war, only one-third of Lebanon's public hospitals were operational, each with an average of 20 beds. By 2009, Lebanon had 28 public hospitals, with a total of 2,550 beds.

At public hospitals, hospitalized uninsured patients pay 5% of the bill, in comparison with 15% in private hospitals, with the Ministry of Public Health reimbursing the remainder. The Ministry of Public Health contracts with 138 private hospitals and 25 public hospitals.

In 2011, there were 236,643 subsidized admissions to hospitals; 164,244 in private hospitals, and 72,399 in public hospitals. More patients visit private hospitals than public hospitals, because the private beds supply is higher. In 2017, the top 10 leading causes of reported hospital deaths were: malignant neoplasm of bronchus or lung (4.6%), Acute myocardial infarction (3%), pneumonia (2.2%), exposure to unspecified factor, unspecified place (2.1%), acute kidney injury (1.4%), intra-cerebral hemorrhage (1.2%), malignant neoplasm of colon (1.2%), malignant neoplasm of pancreas (1.1%), malignant neoplasm of prostate (1.1%), malignant neoplasm of bladder (0.8%).

Recently, there has been an increase in foodborne illnesses in Lebanon. This has raised public awareness on the importance of food safety, including in the realms of food storage, preservation, and preparation. More restaurants are seeking information and compliance with International Organization for Standardization.

The Asfouriyeh Hospital, founded in 1896 in Lebanon, is considered the first modern mental health hospital in the Middle East. The devastating impact of the Lebanese Civil War led to the hospital's closure in 1982.

== Culture ==
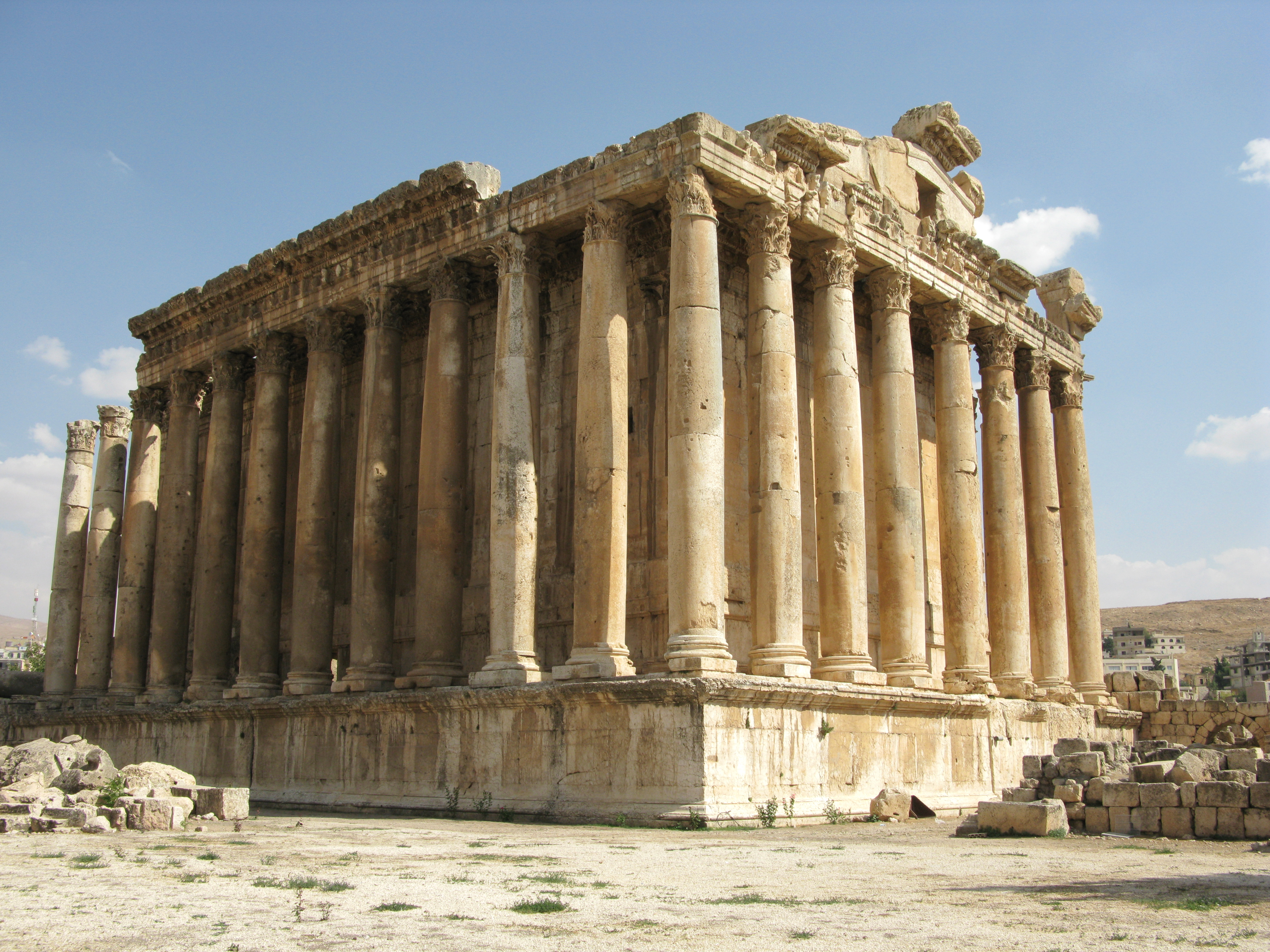
The Temple of Bacchus is considered among the best preserved Roman temples in the world, c. 150 AD.

The culture of Lebanon reflects the legacy of various civilizations spanning thousands of years. Originally home to the Canaanite-Phoenicians, and then conquered and occupied by the Assyrians, the Persians, the Greeks, the Romans, the Arabs, the Crusaders, the Ottoman Turks and most recently the French, Lebanese culture has over the millennia evolved by borrowing from all of these groups.

Lebanon's diverse population, composed of different ethnic and religious groups, has further contributed to the country's festivals, musical styles and literature as well as cuisine. Despite the ethnic, linguistic, religious and denominational diversity of the Lebanese, they "share an almost common culture". Lebanese Arabic is universally spoken while food, music, and literature are deep-rooted "in wider Mediterranean and Levantine norms".

=== Arts ===
In visual arts, Moustafa Farroukh was among Lebanon's most prominent painters of the 20th century. Formally trained in Rome and Paris, he exhibited in venues from Paris to New York to Beirut over his career. Many more contemporary artists are active, such as Walid Raad, a contemporary media artist residing in New York. In the field of photography, the Arab Image Foundation has a collection of over 400,000 photographs from Lebanon and the Middle East. The photographs can be viewed in a research center and various events and publications have been produced in Lebanon and worldwide to promote the collection.

=== Literature ===
In literature, Kahlil Gibran is the third best-selling poet of all time, behind Shakespeare and Laozi. He is particularly known for his 1923 book The Prophet, which has been translated into over twenty different languages. Ameen Rihani was a major figure in the mahjar literary movement developed by Arab emigrants in North America, and an early theorist of Arab nationalism. Mikhail Naimy is widely recognized as among the most important figures in modern Arabic letters and among the most important spiritual writers of the 20th century. Several contemporary Lebanese writers have also achieved international success; including Elias Khoury, Amin Maalouf, Hanan al-Shaykh, and Georges Schéhadé.

=== Music ===
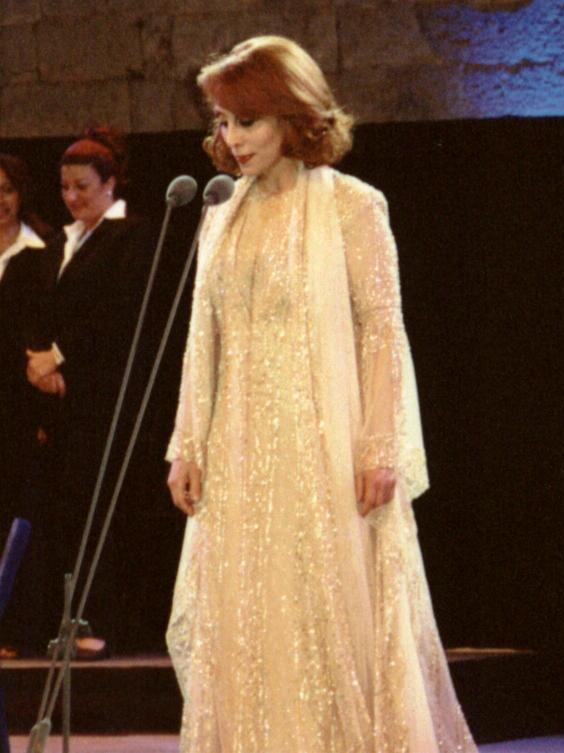
Fairuz

While traditional folk music remains popular in Lebanon, modern music reconciling Western and traditional Arabic styles, pop, and fusion are rapidly advancing in popularity. Lebanese artists like Fairuz, Majida El Roumi, Wadih El Safi, Sabah, Julia Boutros or Najwa Karam are widely known and appreciated in Lebanon and in the Arab world. Radio stations feature a variety of music, including traditional Lebanese, classical Arabic, Armenian and modern French, English, American, and Latin tunes.

=== Media and cinema ===
The cinema of Lebanon, according to film critic and historian, Roy Armes, was the only cinema in the Arabic-speaking region, besides the dominant Egyptian cinema, that could amount to a national cinema. Cinema in Lebanon has been in existence since the 1920s. Lebanon has produced over 500 films, with many films including Egyptian filmmakers and film stars.

The media of Lebanon is a regional center of production and the most liberal and free in the Arab world. According to Press freedom's Reporters Without Borders, "the media have more freedom in Lebanon than in any other Arab country". Despite its small population and geographic size, Lebanon plays an influential role in the production of information in the Arab world and is "at the core of a regional media network with global implications".

=== Holidays and festivals ===
Lebanon celebrates national and both Christian and Muslim holidays. Christian holidays are celebrated following both the Gregorian calendar and Julian calendar. Greek Orthodox (with the exception of Easter), Catholics, Protestants, and Melkite Christians follow the Gregorian Calendar and thus celebrate Christmas on 25 December. Armenian Apostolic Christians celebrate Christmas on 6 January, as they follow the Julian Calendar.

Muslim holidays are followed based on the Islamic lunar calendar. Muslim holidays that are celebrated include Eid al-Fitr (the three-day feast at the end of the Ramadan month), Eid al-Adha (The Feast of the Sacrifice) which is celebrated during the annual pilgrimage to Mecca and also celebrates Abraham's willingness to sacrifice his son to God, the Birth of the Islamic prophet Muhammad, and Ashura (the Shiite Day of Mourning). Lebanon's National Holidays include Workers Day, Independence Day, and Martyrs Day. Music festivals, often hosted at historical sites, are a customary element of Lebanese culture.

Among the most famous are Baalbeck International Festival, Byblos International Festival, Beiteddine International Festival, Jounieh International Festival, Broumana Festival, Batroun International Festival, Ehmej Festival, Dhour Chwer Festival and Tyr Festival. These festivals are promoted by Lebanon's Ministry of Tourism. Lebanon hosts about 15 concerts from international performers each year, ranking 1st for nightlife in the Middle East, and 6th worldwide.

=== Cuisine ===
Lebanese cuisine is similar to those of many countries in the Eastern Mediterranean, such as Syria, Turkey, Greece, and Cyprus. The Lebanese national dishes are the kibbe, a meat pie made from finely minced lamb and burghul (cracked wheat), and the tabbouleh, a salad made from parsley, tomatoes, and burghul wheat. Lebanese restaurant meals begin with a wide array of mezze – small savoury dishes, such as dips, salads, and pastries. The mezze are typically followed by a selection of grilled meat or fish. In general, meals are finished with Arabic coffee and fresh fruit, though sometimes a selection of traditional sweets will be offered as well.

=== Sports ===
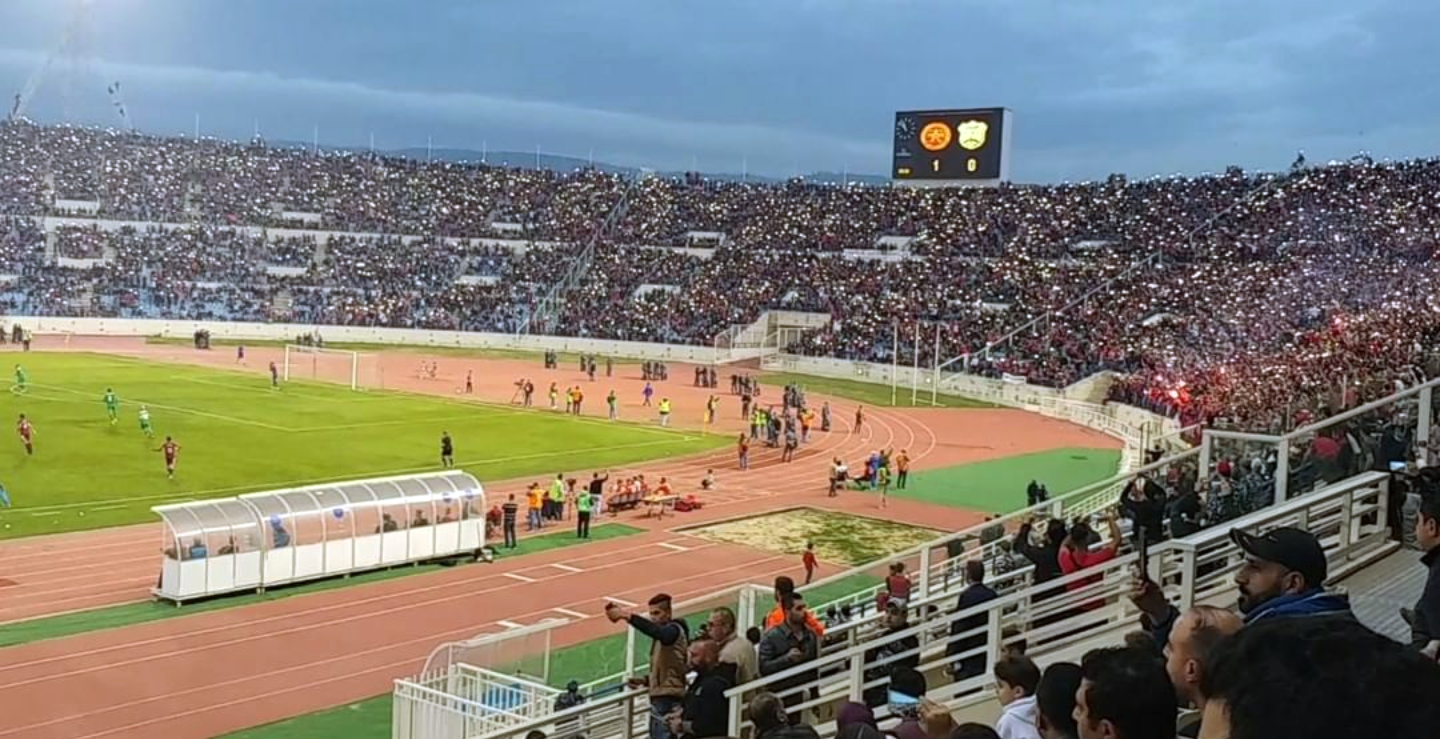
Camille Chamoun Sports City Stadium in Beirut

Lebanon has six ski resorts. The country's unique geography makes it possible to go skiing in the morning and swimming in the Mediterranean Sea in the afternoon. At the competitive level, basketball and football are among Lebanon's most popular sports. Canoeing, cycling, rafting, climbing, swimming, sailing and caving are among the other common leisure sports in Lebanon. The Beirut Marathon is held every fall, drawing top runners from Lebanon and abroad.

Rugby league is a relatively new but growing sport in Lebanon. The Lebanon national rugby league team participated in the 2000 Rugby League World Cup, and narrowly missed qualification for the 2008 and 2013 tournaments. They qualified again for the 2017 World Cup reaching the quarter-finals, narrowly losing 24–22 to Tonga. This ensured qualification for 2021. Their 2021 quarterfinal was not as competitive, losing 48–4 to eventual champions Australia. Lebanon also took part in the 2009 European Cup where, after narrowly failing to qualify for the final, the team defeated Ireland to finish 3rd in the tournament.

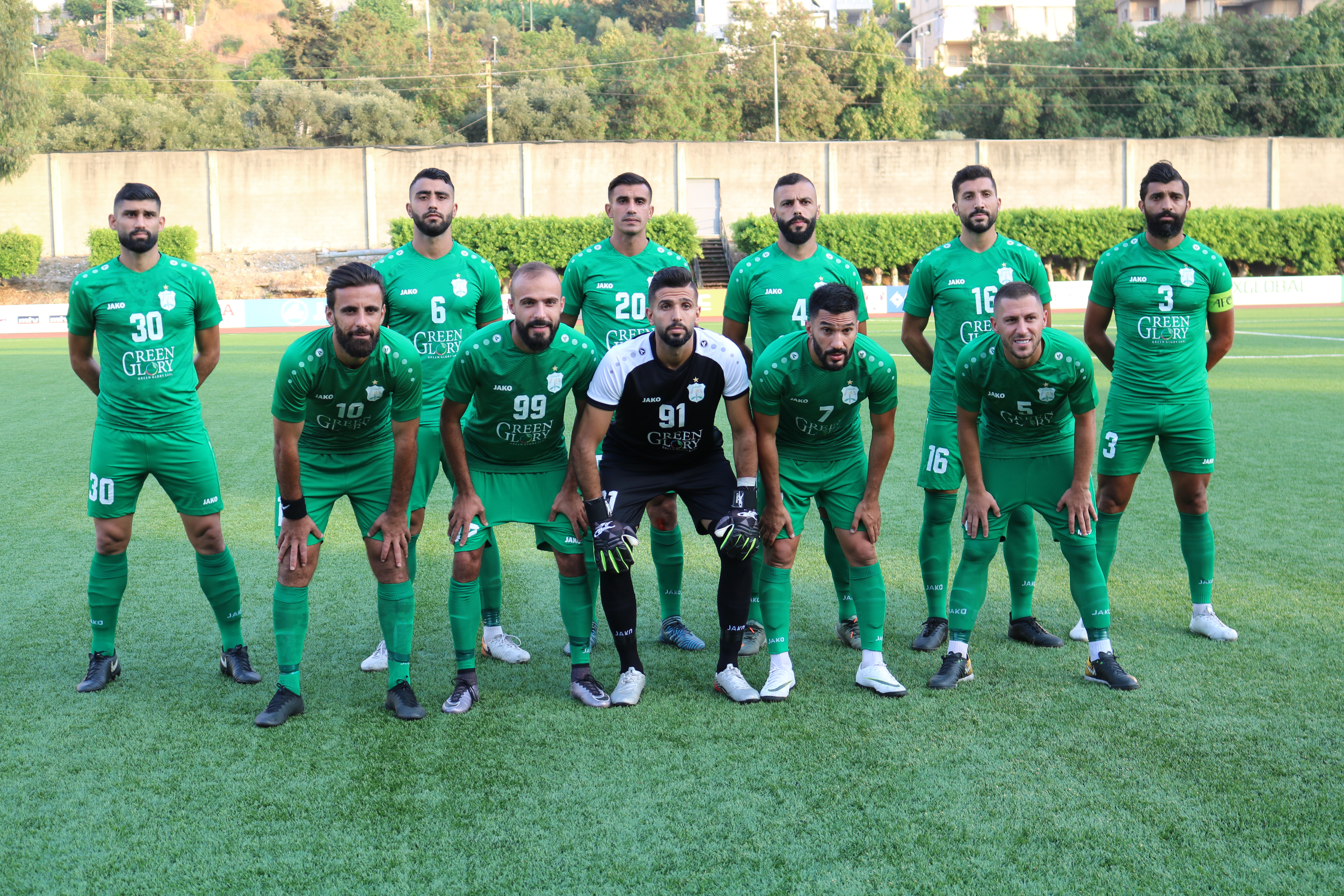
Al Ansar FC in Beirut

Lebanon participates in basketball. The Lebanese National Team qualified for the FIBA World Championship three times in a row. Dominant basketball teams are Sporting Al Riyadi Beirut, who are the Arab and Asian champions, and Club Sagesse, who have earned the Asian and Arab championships.

Football is also among the more popular sports in the country. The top football league is the Lebanese Premier League, whose most successful clubs are Al Ansar FC and Nejmeh SC. In recent years, Lebanon has hosted the AFC Asian Cup and the Pan Arab Games. Lebanon hosted the 2009 Jeux de la Francophonie, and have participated in every Olympic Games since its independence, winning a total of four medals. Water sports in Lebanon have been very active in recent years. Since 2012 and with the emergence of the Lebanon Water Festival NGO, more emphasis has been placed on those sports, and Lebanon has been pushed forward as a water sport destination internationally. They host different contests and water show sports that encourage their fans to participate and win big.

== See also ==
- Outline of Lebanon
