= Sehnaoui =

Sehnaoui (Arabic: صحناوي) is a Lebanese surname that comes from the Syrian town of Sahnaya, it may refer to:

- Antoun Sehnaoui, Lebanese banker and film producer
- Khalil Sehnaoui, Belgian-Lebanese information security consultant
- Mouna Bassili Sehnaoui (born 1945), Lebanese painter, writer and artist, mother of Khalil
- Nada Sehnaoui (born 1958), Lebanese visual artist and political activist
- Nicolas Sehnaoui (born 1967), Lebanese politician, cousin of Antoun and Khalil, nephew of Mouna
