= Antoun Sehnaoui =

Lebanese banker and film producer (born 1972)

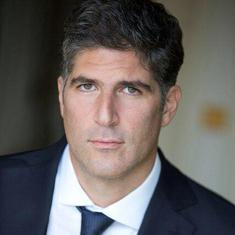
- Sehnaoui in 2019
- Born: November 3, 1972 (age 53); Beirut, Lebanon
- Occupations: Banker, philanthropist, producer
- Organization(s): Société Générale de Banque au Liban, Ezekiel Film Production
- Children: 2
- Parents: Nabil Sehnaoui (father); May Sehnaoui (mother)
- Relatives: Nicolas Sehnaoui (cousin), Khalil Sehnaoui (cousin), Mouna Bassili Sehnaoui (aunt)
- Website: antounsehnaoui.com

Antoun Sehnaoui (Arabic: أنطون الصحناوي; born 3 November 1972) is a Lebanese banker and film producer. He is the chairman of the board of the SGBL Group, comprising the Société Générale de Banque au Liban (SGBL), the Société Générale de Banque in Jordan (SGBJ), and financial company Fidus Wealth Management. He is also the chairman of the board of the Compagnie Financière Richelieu, a European banking group comprising Banque Richelieu France, Banque Richelieu Monaco, and Richelieu Gestion. He is also a member of the board of the Lebanese Banking Association, and a member of the Academy of Motion Picture Arts and Sciences.

== Early life and education ==
Sehnaoui was born in Beirut on November 3, 1972, to Nabil Sehnaoui. He grew up in Lebanon during the Lebanese Civil War and attended the Collège Notre-Dame de Jamhour. He then moved to the United States where he graduated from the University of Southern California.

== Banking ==
Sehnaoui suddenly became chairman of the SGBL Group in October 2007. In 2011 SGBL acquired most of the assets of the Lebanese Canadian Bank and in 2017 it expanded into the United Arab Emirates, opening a fully owned subsidiary within the Abu Dhabi Global Market, and into the USA market by acquiring Pikes Peak National Bank in Colorado. SGBL is the third largest bank in Lebanon in terms of deposits and assets, and the fourth in terms of profitability. Sehnaoui expanded into Europe in 2018 with the acquisition of Banque Richelieu in France and Monaco.

== Media ==
In 1998, Sehnaoui created NewsMedia SAL, a publishing company, and then Executive, an independent business magazine focused on Lebanon and the GCC countries. Executive is a publication concerning economic and financial matters across the Middle East and North Africa (MENA) region. In 2010, Executive became a member of the Business Publications Audit (BPA) Worldwide. Yasser Akkaoui is the editor-in-chief of Executive.

== Film production ==
Sehnaoui is a partner in the production company "Rouge International", in collaboration with French actress and producer Julie Gayet, and founded the production company "Ezekiel Film Production". The movie Clouds of Sils Maria was released in 2014 and went on to receive over 25 awards nominations and 9 wins including the César Award for best supporting actress for Kristen Stewart. The movie The Insult was released in 2017 and was selected as the Lebanese entry for the Best Foreign Language Film as well as being nominated in the category at the 90th Academy Awards.

== Philanthropy and Personal Life ==
Sehnaoui supports the Beirut International Film Festival, the French Book Fair, and more than a dozen arts and cultural festivals a year. He agreed to lend an antique bed bought at auction at Bonhams of London to Ordsall Hall for a duration of five years.

He is also a patron of Lebanese sports through a partnership with the National Basketball Federation and made a US$7 million donation in 2017 for the financing of the new sports center of the Lebanese American University (LAU)

Sehnaoui donated, in the name of his parents, the Saint Charbel Makhlouf Shrine in St. Patrick's Cathedral (Manhattan) in New-York city that was inaugurated on October 28 of 2017. The inauguration ceremony was attended by Lebanese Maronite Patriarch Bechara Boutros al-Rahi as well as Cardinal Timothy M. Dolan. The shrine features a mosaic of Saint Charbel Makhlouf along with national Lebanese emblems such as the lebanese cedar and a relic of the Saint.

He is also a patron of animal rights activists.

In January 2026, Annahar and Ynet reported that Sehnaoui was in a relationship with U.S. National Security official Morgan Ortagus, formerly the Deputy Presidential Envoy to the Middle East.

== Controversies ==
In 2022 in Lebanon Public Prosecutor Judge pressed charges against the Société Générale de Banque au Liban (SGBL) and its CEO Antoun Sehnaoui "over alleged money laundering". According to Daraj Media, Antoun Sehnaoui owes part of his fortune to the financial policies of Riad Salameh who was governor of Lebanon's central bank, Banque du Liban, from August 1993 until July 2023, accused of corruption, and, since 2023, under sanctions by Canada, the United Kingdom and the United States. The Daraj journalist Ramy al Amine writes that Antoun Sehnaoui enriched himself through "through so-called financial engineering operations which enriched bankers and led the country into the worst economic crisis in its history, pushing most Lebanese to the brink of collapse and plunging them below the poverty line".

In 2015, Tarek Yatim, who was believed to be the bodyguard of Antoun Sehnaoui, stabbed to death a Lebanese citizen, George Rif, during a road rage incident. Sehnaoui denied any link between him and the case in question.

News emerged about Sehnaoui alleging that he had affiliation with the fundamentalist Christian party Jnoud al Rab (Soldiers of God) and was providing funds for the group. Though he did not directly deny funding or sponsoring the group, he called the accusations "fabrications and false news". According to the International Centre for the Study of Radicalisation "the bulk of the financing of Soldiers of God falls on the shoulders of Antoun Sehnaoui".

In July 2026, Antoun Sehnaoui sat at the same table as Israeli Prime Minister Benjamin Netanyahu during a private memorial dinner in Washington, D.C. The dinner was held at the Four Seasons Hotel in Washington, D.C., to honor the memory of the late U.S. Senator Lindsey Graham. The private memorial gathering was co-hosted by Sehnaoui and Morgan Ortagus, a former U.S. diplomat and Trump administration envoy. The dinner lasted roughly three hours and drew around 20 Republican and Democratic U.S. senators (including Ted Cruz, John Fetterman, and Chris Coons) alongside senior Trump administration advisers like Stephen Miller.

The photograph emerged while Lebanon is still heavily reeling from military conflict with Israel. The image of a Lebanese important figure hosting the Israeli Prime Minister has been widely condemned by critics in Beirut as an act of political tone-deafness or treason. Lebanon and Israel remain officially in a state of war. Lebanese law strictly prohibits its citizens from engaging in direct contact, normalisation, or dealings with Israeli officials and institutions.

== See also ==
- Marwan Kheireddine
- Salim Sfeir
