= Akkaoui =

Akkaoui is a surname. Notable people with the surname include:

- Malika Akkaoui (born 1987), Moroccan middle-distance runner
- Yasser Akkaoui (born 1969), Lebanese activist and journalist
