= Nada Sehnaoui =

Lebanese visual artist and activist

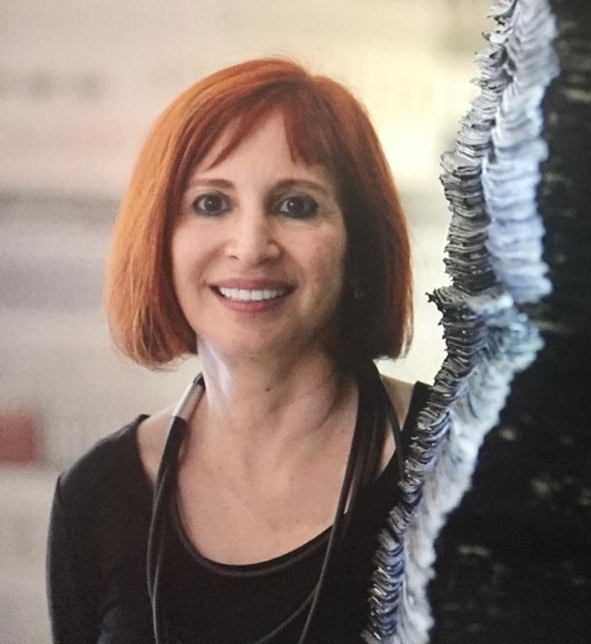
- Born: 1950 (age 75–76); Beirut, Lebanon
- Occupations: Visual artist, political activist
- Years active: 1993-–present
- Notable work: Peindre L'Orient-Le Jour (1999), Haven't 15 Years of Hiding in the Toilets Been Enough (2008), How Many How Many More (2016–present).

Nada Sehnaoui (born 1958) is a visual artist and political activist. Her artworks, spanning painting, mixed media works, sculpture and installations, have been widely exhibited internationally, and have been featured in the press and print publications worldwide.

Sehnaoui, who was born in Beirut and received her academic training in history, sociology, film, and the fine arts, is a pioneer of large-scale ephemeral public art installations in Lebanon and the Middle East. Active since the early nineteen-nineties, she has been a part of shaping the postwar Lebanese artistic scene through artworks that seek to provoke a discussion around issues surrounding the memory of wars, in particular the 1975-1990 Lebanese Civil War. She has denounced the personal and collective amnesia surrounding this conflict, as well as Lebanon's physical and political fragmentation that followed it. Her works not only underscore the imperative of reflecting on the multiple memories of that war but also on the processes and necessity of national reconciliation. She questions the writing of History and the construction of identity, in the Arab world and beyond, and continuously asks for reflection and rebellion against the status quo.

Sehnaoui's paintings, sculptures, and installations are characteristically time- and labor-intensive, drawing a parallel between her artistic process and the time necessary to process memory. She is known for her recurrent use of repetition as a stylistic and meaning-breeding effect, intersecting the work's experiential time, creative time, and archival time, especially in her large-scale installations, staged in urban spaces and in institutions, and which make use of everyday life objects. She is also preoccupied with the aesthetics and emotional charge of conceptual art.

Her body of work includes installations such as Fractions of Memory (2003), Waynoun? Where are They? (2006), Haven’t 15 Years of Hiding in the Toilets Been Enough? (2008), and Light at the End of the Tunnel (2012), and series of paintings incorporating layers of paint, objects, words and images, as seen for instance in Peindre L'Orient-Le Jour (2000), How Many How Many More (2014–present), orTulips for a Wounded Country (1992–present).

Sehnaoui's works have been exhibited internationally in Europe, the United States, and the Middle East and North Africa, including in New York, Boston, Washington D.C., London, Paris, Marseille, Liège, Houston, Munich, Beirut, Dubai, and Doha.

An activist in the fields of human rights and political reform, Sehnaoui is a member of Beirut Madinati, an urban public policy organization under whose umbrella she ran for a seat on Beirut's municipal council in 2016. She is also a founding member of the Civil Center for National Initiative, whose works include a legal campaign to remove reference to sect from state records, and an initiative to legally administer civil marriages in Lebanon.

== Early life and studies ==
Born and raised in Beirut, Sehnaoui was a teenager when the 1975 Lebanese Civil War broke out. She witnessed up close the physical and mental division of the Lebanese capital city into East and West Beirut, and the eminent danger of crossing the demarcation line separating her house in East Beirut from her school in West Beirut.

She subsequently travelled abroad to pursue higher education, studying at Paris Nanterre University and the University of Sorbonne Nouvelle Paris III, from which she graduated in 1981 with, respectively, a master's degree in sociology and a Diploma in Theoretical Film Studies. In 1983, she moved to the United States where she pursued studies in film production at Boston University. In 1985, she returned to Beirut where her son Abdallah Salam was born a year later. When in Lebanon, she completed the thesis for her DEA-Diplôme d'Études Approfondies in History at Paris-Sorbonne University (1987). In 1989 she returned to the United States with her family and enrolled at Boston's School of the Museum of Fine Arts, from which she graduated in 1995 with a diploma and a fifth year. That same year, she moved back to Beirut, where she has since based her artistic practice.

== Artistic career ==
=== Early works: paintings and mixed media series (1993–2000) ===
Shaped by her experience of wartime Beirut, Sehnaoui was interested early on in exploring issues of separation and fragmentation, delving not only into the Lebanese capital's history but also tackling those of other cities wounded by war. She notably actively engaged with the visual and textual archives of different wars around the globe and started incorporating them in her paintings and mixed media artworks. This close engagement with text characterizes not only Sehnaoui's early career, but also her later works.

One of her first painting series, War Games (c. 1995), pointed to issues surrounding physical and mental division, and the difficulty of crossing from one side of town to another in times of war. The paintings, in which she sometimes inserted archival images, press clippings, or text, referenced the divided urban landscapes of Beirut and Jerusalem. Likewise, the series of paintings Sarajevo (1995), which used similar techniques, bore witness to the everyday life of this city's inhabitants during the Yugoslavian Wars while drawing parallels with the life circumstances of wartime Beirut.

From the mid-nineties on, Sehnaoui further developed her focus on the memory of the Civil War, and in particular the collective amnesia of the conflict condoned by Lebanon's Amnesty Law of 1991. Thus, Lebanese War Statistics (1995) took as a starting point accounts of the number of dead, wounded, and disappeared persons during the Lebanese Civil War, as published in Western media such as The New York Times and France's Le Monde. The series of mixed media works, using paint, text, and bandages, memorialized the conflict's victims, in the aim of healing the country.

When Reading T.S. Eliot (1999) featured rows of painted fragments of Eliot's poems set on large canvases. The series of works pointed to time's cyclicality and human vanity, drawing on the poet's meditation on existential concerns, and, further, making a parallel between post-World War I disillusionment and post-Civil-War Lebanon.

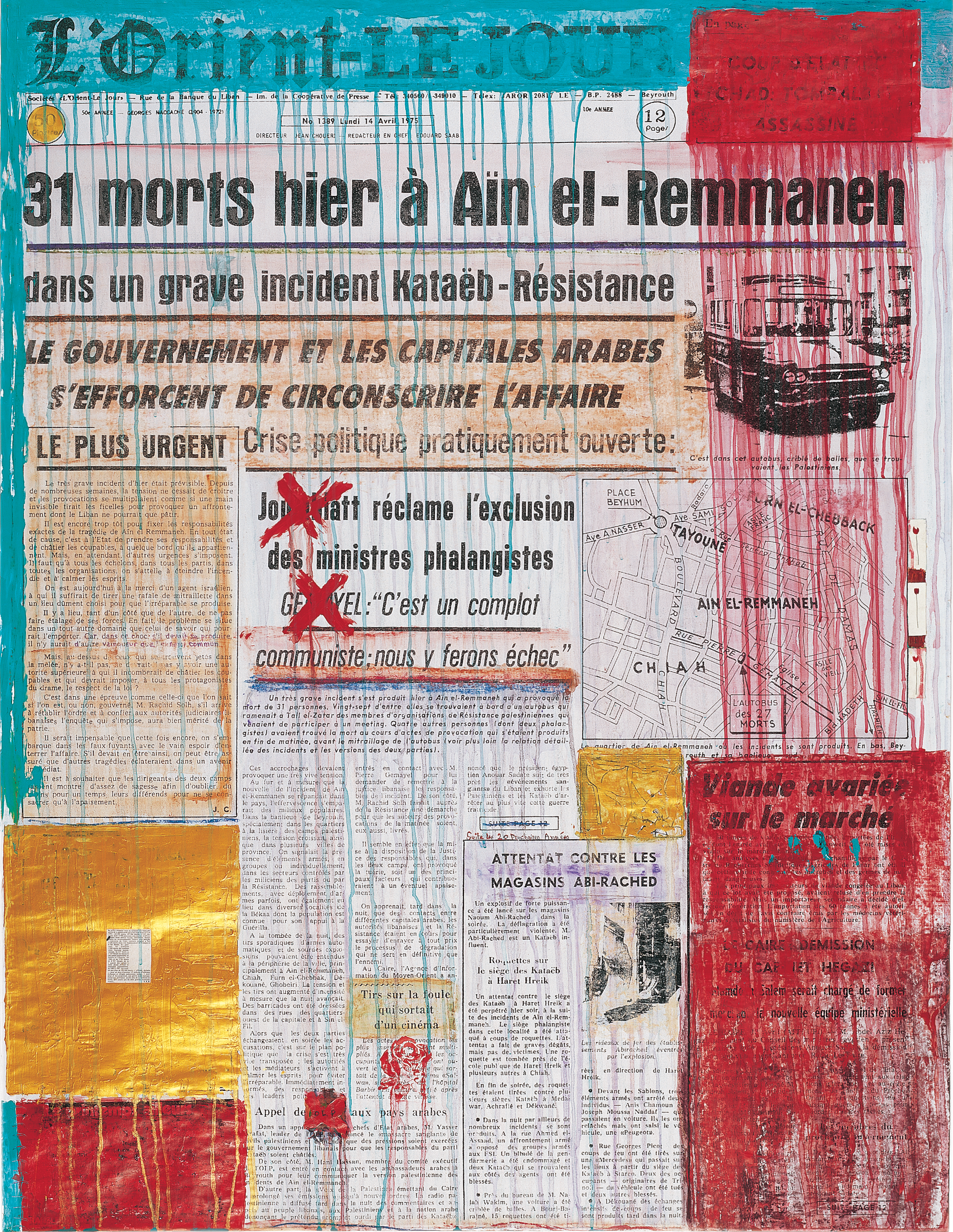
Nada Sehnaoui, Painting the L'Orient-Le Jour, 1999. Mixed media on paper, 117x152 cm. Private collection.

With Peindre L'Orient-Le Jour (in English: Painting the L'Orient-Le Jour) (1999), Sehnaoui painted over, cut up, reconfigured and rewrote the front page of Lebanon's leading Francophone newspaper, every day for an entire year. She reorganized the news, masking certain articles while bringing others forward to the front page, to comment on information and disinformation, journalistic truth and the use of archives.

Then, Sehnaoui's series of mixed media works, Martyrs' Square Revisited (2000) used photographs of downtown Beirut right before the beginning of postwar reconstruction period to spur reflection around the history and memory of the Lebanese war and of the city of Beirut, and pondered its future development after destruction.

Throughout the nineteen-nineties, Sehnaoui also tackled specific sociopolitical topics related to Lebanon. Legal Violence (1998), for instance, dealt with women's rights to the guardianship of their children under Lebanese family laws, which are administered by religious courts belonging to Lebanon's different sects.

=== Installations (2001–2012) ===
A pioneer of ephemeral art installations in Lebanon, Sehnaoui has also exhibited such works in Tunis (Tunisia), Marseilles (France), London (United Kingdom), Liège (Belgium) and Doha (Qatar). Since 2001, she has been creating large-scale, site-specific, installations in institutions and urban spaces. These works generally repurpose dozens of mundane everyday objects, and their underlying message conveys the urgency of national reconciliation and social change. They constitute spaces for personal meditation, social reflection, and collective healing, often using the trope of repetition to breed meaning. Sehnaoui has used objects as varied as rolling pins, brooms, and toilet seats to convey the importance of acknowledging the legacy and memory of war and to promote national healing.

Her first installation, Promenade in Your Dreams (2001), asked more than 1,600 students of the International College, a Beirut private school, to describe the school of their dreams, writing or drawing it on the school formatted paper that were later glued on wooden tablets. Sehnaoui then exhibited the responses in the school's open-air amphitheater.

Her following installations dealt with the collective memory of the Lebanese Civil War. In 2003, Fractions of Memory started with an open call to the public to share a memory of daily life before the war, writing it on a sheet of paper, resulting in 360 structures constructed with 20 tons of paper displaying their responses, which were exhibited in Martyrs' Square, in the heart of downtown Beirut.

Likewise, Plastic Memory Containers (2004) probed the relationship of the inhabitants of the Lebanese city of Byblos with their 6,000-year-old heritage, which they generally claimed to take pride in, and simultaneously asked them about their recollections of the recent past, which proved more difficult to them. Sehnaoui then filled one hundred white plastic buckets with 3,000 pieces of crumbled papers on which was written a text questioning the meaning of a 6000-year-old history while having no memory of the recent past.

Extending her installation practice internationally to address global issues, the same year, Sehnaoui staged Sand, a reaction to desertification and the shortage of drinking water in Tunisia, during the 3rd Mediterranean Art Biennale in Tunis.

In 2006, the Lebanese Committee of the Families of the kidnapped and the disappeared commissioned Sehnaoui to create the installation Waynoun?/Where Are They? At the time, more than 3,000 individuals were thought to still be missing in the aftermath of the Civil War, and the 1991 Amnesty law prevented inquiries into their whereabouts or deaths. Sehnaoui called attention to this situation with an installation exhibiting 3,000 names and 400 photographs glued on white and black balloons, which was exhibited in the ruins of an unfinished cinema nicknamed the Dome (or the Egg) in downtown Beirut.

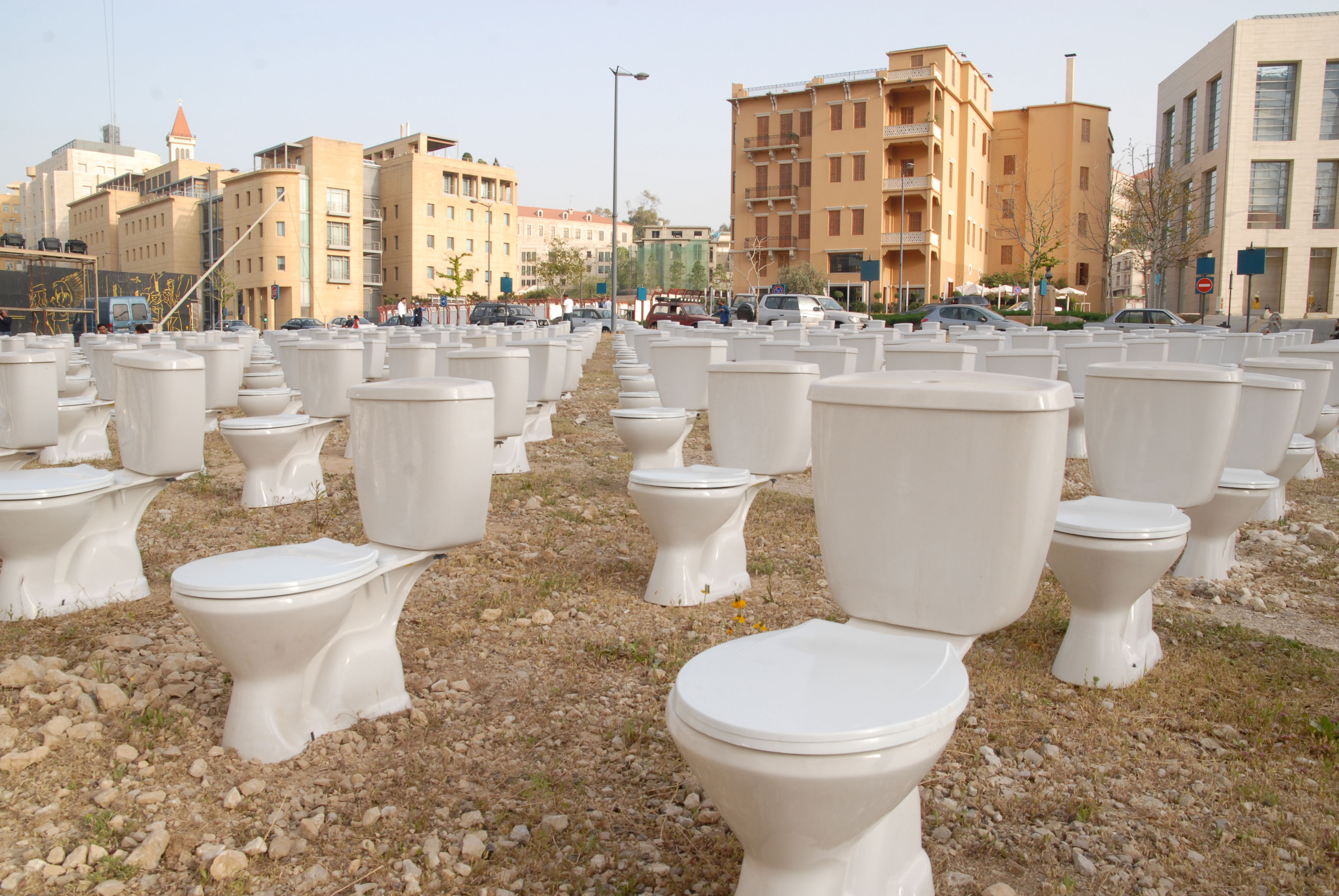
Nada Sehnaoui, View of installation Haven't 15 Years of Hiding in the Toilets Been Enough? Downtown Beirut, 2008.

Two years later, Sehnaoui exhibited Haven’t 15 Years of Hiding in the Toilets Been Enough?, an installation consisting of six hundred toilet seats lined up in a grid near Martyrs' Square, in the center of downtown Beirut. The work was based on Sehnaoui's memories of the Civil War, a time when many Lebanese citizens used to hide in bathrooms to take refuge from bombs and sniper fire.

In 2008, Sehnaoui also presented the installation Migratory Symphony, which tackled issues of immigration, in Marseilles. For this work, Sehnaoui interrogated one hundred school children about their family stories of migration, an urgent topic on both sides of the Mediterranean. Migratory Symphony was followed by Rubble, staged in Doha, Qatar, in 2009. This work had its roots in the aftermath of the 2006 Lebanon war, when Sehnaoui had taken more than four hundred photographs of the aftermath of Israeli bombings of Beirut. The display, beyond the specific origin of the photographs, proposed a reflection on humankind's universal capacity to turn fellow human beings' lives into rubble.

In 2010, focusing on the question of meditation as a tool for healing, Sehnaoui presented This too Shall Pass, an installation made out of several rows of concentric circles of rolling pins, shown at Sursock Museum in Beirut. The installation was conceived as a prayer for the future, particularly in Lebanon after the 2006 Lebanon War.

In 2011, she exhibited To Sweep, an accumulation of dozens of brooms appearing to sweep words such as "obscurantism," "terrorism," "war" and "totalitarianism," referencing the acts of remembering and forgetting. The artwork, first shown in Beirut at the Beirut Exhibition Center and then in London at the Royal College of Art, embodied a general gesture of civil contestation as well as a metaphor for starting again, one particularly important to the Arab world at the time, in the context of the Arab Spring. To Sehnaoui, sweeping represents not only an everyday mundane action but also a powerful collective project following a war or a revolution.

Sehnaoui's latest urban installation, Light at the end of the Tunnel, was staged in 2012 in Beirut's waterfront Zaitunay Bay neighborhood. Consisting of 360 interlocking red wooden parallelepipeds, it invited passers-by to reflect on the politics embedded in a simple city walk, and acted as the manifestation of a collective will for a brighter future.

=== Return to painting and sculpture (2016–present) ===
Sehnaoui's 2016 exhibition, Along These Lines, at Isabelle Van Den Eyde Gallery in Dubai, and her following solo show, How Many How Many More, at Galerie Tanit in Beirut in March 2019, marked her return to painting and sculpture after a decade of focusing mainly on large-scale installations. According to Sehnaoui, the shift stemmed from a deep need to paint, as she considers herself a painter who broadened her practice to the public space. The works, although smaller in scale than her public installations, are likewise labour-intensive, as Sehnaoui insists on the importance of the meditative time of creation. Their themes are in the continuation of her overarching project to work on collective memory and build a hopeful future, and crystallize her concerns with reckoning with the memory of wars and fostering national reconciliation. Deepening her philosophical reflection, Sehnaoui also proposes a meditation on time, repetition, resilience, and hope at the personal and societal level.

==== Painting ====
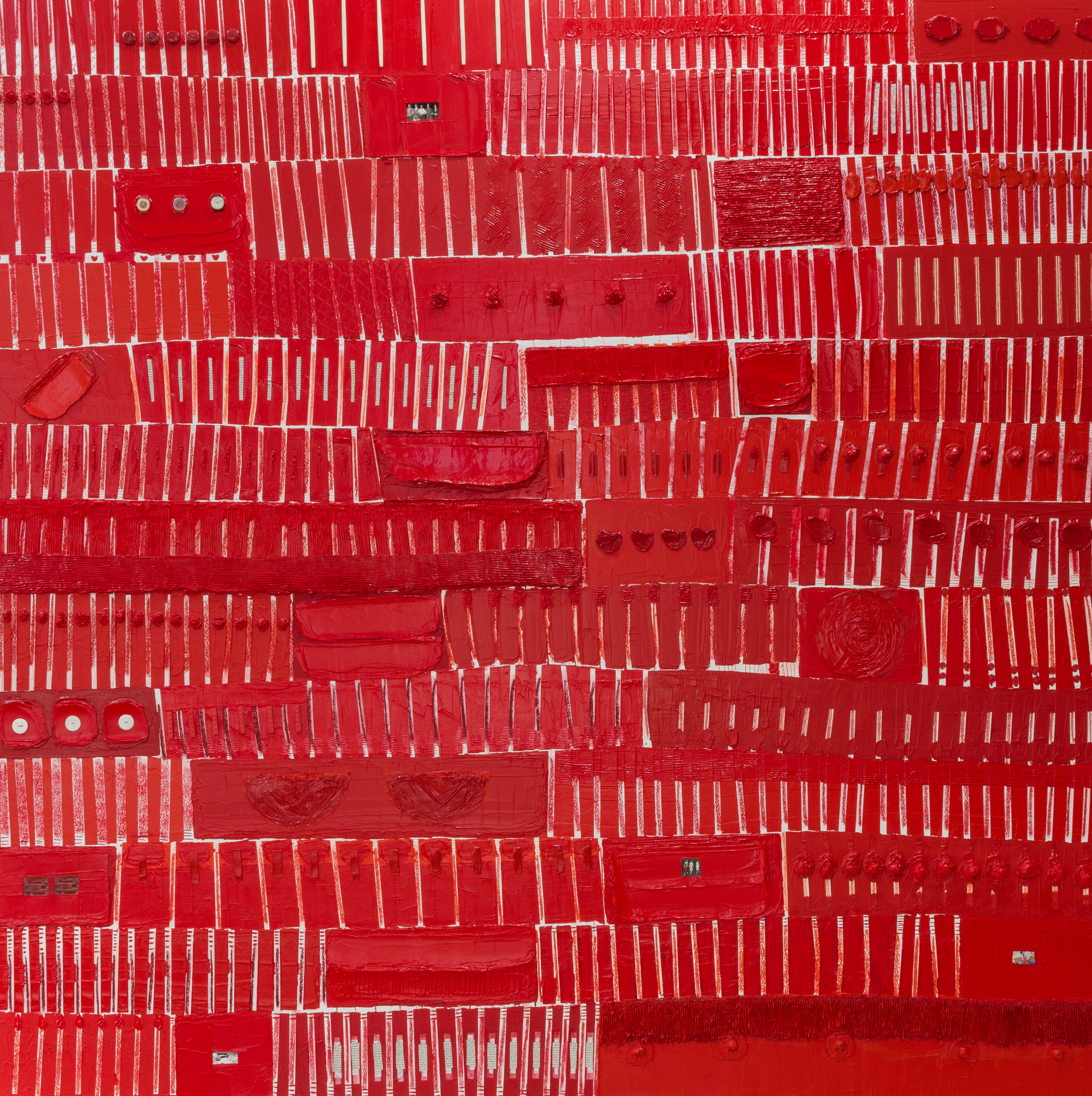
Nada Sehnaoui, How Many How Many More VIII, 2018–2019. Acrylics, pastels, crayons, maps, newspapers, photographs and beads on canvas, 200 x 200 cm.

In 2019, Sehnaoui exhibited an ongoing series of paintings, Tulips for a Wounded Country, which began as prints in 1991. This series was first spurred by a walk in tulip fields in the Netherlands. These dozens of paintings of flowers, alone or arranged in vivid grids, constitute peace offerings to Lebanon, full of hopeful and celebratory symbolism, and envision the possibility of a non-violent world. In 2016 and 2019, she also exhibited a collection of large-scale paintings, How Many How Many More, marked by systematic repetitive series of colored stripes within which she inserted archival photographs, buttons, beads, open medication capsules, and strips of newspaper, creating works at once cheerful and elegiac. The series started as a reaction to the ongoing wars in the Arab world, notably in Syria, and led to a personal reflection on the finiteness of human life, as well as a plea for peace. These works are simultaneously abstract paintings, collages, and landscapes that underscore the way memory is at once fragmentary, personal, and collective, as the repetition of stripes is meant to echo one counting the days of life.

==== Sculptures and installations ====
In 2018 and 2019, Sehnaoui also conceived several sculptures addressing the socio-political stagnation in Lebanon and the need for a national reconciliation. In Pieces represented a three-dimensional map of Lebanon cut into interlocking parts, resembling the separated pieces of a puzzle and constituting at once a metaphor for the continuous divisions plaguing the country and the ability of Lebanese to reunite their nation. Les Mauvaises Nouvelles du Monde (in English: the Bad News of the World), meanwhile, was a close to two-meter-high pile of issues of An-Nahar newspapers glued together and painted black, commenting on the omnipresence of bad news and disinformation, while seeking to exorcise them. In this work, information is no longer legible, and the 24-hour news cycle metaphorically interrupted. Another work, Broken, assembled punched-in ping pong balls in a vertical pole, making reference to the duality between vulnerability and resilience at the personal and the State level. In 2019, the installation Lungs displayed a line of several exhaust pipes, painted white, on an exhibition wall, to call attention, at once, to pollution, the collective desire to symbolically breathe, and to emit a wishful sigh of political and social relief.

== Selected exhibitions ==
=== Solo exhibitions ===
2019 How Many How Many More. Galerie Tanit, Beirut, Lebanon.

2016 Along These Lines. Gallery Isabelle Van Den Eynde, Dubai, United Arab Emirates.

2009 Rubble. The Gallery at Virginia Commonwealth University in Qatar, Doha.

2008 Haven't 15 Years of Hiding in the Toilets Been Enough? Starco center, Beirut, Lebanon.

2006 Waynoun? Where Are They? Downtown, Beirut, Lebanon.

2003 Fractions of Memory. Martyrs' Square, Beirut, Lebanon.

2000 Peindre L'Orient-Le Jour. Galerie Épreuve d’Artiste, Beirut, Lebanon.

=== Group exhibitions ===
2018 Féminités Plurielles. Galerie Tanit, Beirut, Lebanon.

2017 Ourouba. Beirut Art Fair, Beirut, Lebanon.

2011 Subtitled. Royal College of Art, London, United Kingdom.

2011 Rebirth – Lebanon XXI^{st} Century Contemporary Art. Beirut Exhibition Center, Beirut, Lebanon.

2010 30th Salon d’Automne. Nicolas Ibrahim Sursock Museum, Beirut, Lebanon.

2010 Convergence, New Art From Lebanon. American University Museum. Katzen Art Center, Washington, D.C., United States.

2008 L’Art au Féminin. Museum of Modern Art of Algiers, Algers, Algeria.

2007 Transmission Survie, Voix de Femme. Musée d’Art Moderne et Contemporain, Liège, Belgium.

2005 Levant Foundation Art from Lebanon. Gramillion Gallery, Houston, United States.

2004 Lebanon – The Artist's View II. The Gallery at Cork Street, London.

2004 IIIe Biennale Méditerranéenne des Arts de Tunis. Khaireddine Palace, Tunis, Tunisia.

2001 L’Exception libanaise. Centre Wallonie-Bruxelles, Paris, France.

1999 Rossler Gallery, Munich, Germany.

== Public collections ==
Sehnaoui's artworks are part of several prominent institutional and private collections, including the Commissariat Général aux Relations Internationales de la Communauté Wallonie Bruxelles (Brussels), the Collection of the Ministry of Culture of the United Arab Emirates, the Saradar Collection (Beirut), the Sursock Museum (Beirut), and the MACAM museum (Alita, Lebanon).

== Selected publications ==
=== Books ===
Sehnaoui is the author of the book L'Occidentalisation de la vie quotidienne à Beyrouth 1860–1914 (2002), which analyzes the westernization of daily life in Beirut during the decades of the Mount Lebanon Mutasarrifate, a time of rapid modernization and lifestyle changes in the future Lebanese capital. In addition, Sehnaoui contributed with "Histoire d'une Toile" to the journal Bahithat (2005–2006), where she discussed her making of the portrait of the Lebanese Azoury family.

Sehnaoui has been featured in several publications about Lebanese and international contemporary art, including the Luciano Benetton collection's It's Always Been, Contemporary Artists from Lebanon (2018), including Amal Traboulsi's Galerie Épreuve d'Artiste, Chronique d'une galerie sur fonds de guerre (2017), Carla Calargé's Liban. Mémoires fragmentées d'une guerre obsédante: L'Anamnèse dans la production culturelle francophone (2000–2015), David Carrier and Joachim Pissarro's Wild Art (2013), and Resonances, 82 Lebanese Artists Reviewed by Helen Khal (2011).

=== Exhibition catalogues ===
2018 Féminités Plurielles. Galerie Tanit, Beirut, Lebanon.

2016 Along These Lines. Gallery Isabelle Van Den Eynde, Dubai, United Arab Emirates.

2013 Syri-Arts, 101 Works of Art for Syrian Refugee Children in Lebanon.

2011 Rebirth: Lebanon XXI^{st} Century Contemporary Art. Beirut Exhibition Center, Lebanon.

2010, 2004, 2003, 2000, 1997, 1995 Salon d’Automne, Nicolas Ibrahim Sursock Museum, Beirut, Lebanon.

2010 Convergence, New Art from Lebanon. American University Museum, Katzen Art Center, Washington, D.C., United States.

2008 L'Art au féminin. Musée National d’Art Moderne et Contemporain, Algiers, Algeria.

2007 Sign and Calligraphy, ArtParis-Abu Dhabi, United Arab Emirates.

2006 Pinceaux pour Plumes, 42 peintres libanais à l’appel du livre. Nicolas Ibrahim Sursock Museum, Beirut, Lebanon.

2004 Lebanon: The Artist's View II. The Gallery at Cork Street, London, United Kingdom.

2001 L’Exception libanaise. Centre Wallonie-Bruxelles, Paris, France.

2000 Peindre L'Orient le Jour. L'Orient-Le Jour, Beirut, Lebanon.

2000 Nada Sehnaoui and T.S. Eliot. Denise Bibro Fine Art, New York City, United States.

=== International press ===
Sehnaoui has been featured in several international newspapers and magazines, among them Le Monde, the Los Angeles Times, El Mundo, The Washington Post, L’Express International, Courrier International, and Le Figaro.

== Civic and political activism ==
Sehnaoui is actively engaged in Lebanese civic and political life. She advocates for the enactment of civil laws to both transcend the Lebanese sectarian system and advance individual freedoms, progressive policies to safeguard the environment and public health, and measures to empower women and give effect to human rights.

Sehnaoui is a founding member of the Civil Center for National Initiative, whose works include a legal campaign to remove reference to sect from state records and an initiative to administer civil marriages in the country. She is also a member of Beirut Madinati (in English: Beirut my city), an urban public policy organization which works outside dominant confessional political parties. She has run for municipal office twice in Beirut, the second time under the umbrella of Beirut Madinati in 2016, against candidates from traditional sectarian parties. Despite earning around 28,000 votes (representing around 40% of the votes), she did not win the race.

In addition, since the late 1990s, she has published several articles on human rights and politics in the Lebanese Francophone and Arabic-language press, notably the daily An-Nahar newspaper, where she has been making the case for social justice, human rights and political reform. Among the issues she has addressed are civil marriage, the environment, censorship, women's rights, human rights, and smoking bans. She has called for reform of the sectarian political system and the laws governing parliamentary elections, and pondered the continuous social and political weight of the aftermath of the Civil War in Lebanon.
