= Hawkama =

Hawkamah is a regional institute of corporate governance launched by the Dubai International Financial Centre in cooperation with the Organisation for Economic Co-operation and Development (OECD) and other international bodies. The focus of the institute is to provide guidance and assistance to public and private sector in Middle East and Africa to adopt good governance standards.

Capital Concept, a corporate governance advisory company founded in 2005 by Yasser Akkaoui, was instrumental in the establishment of Hawkamah.
