= Rami Ollaik =

Lebanese based writer, activist, attorney, and professor (born 1972)

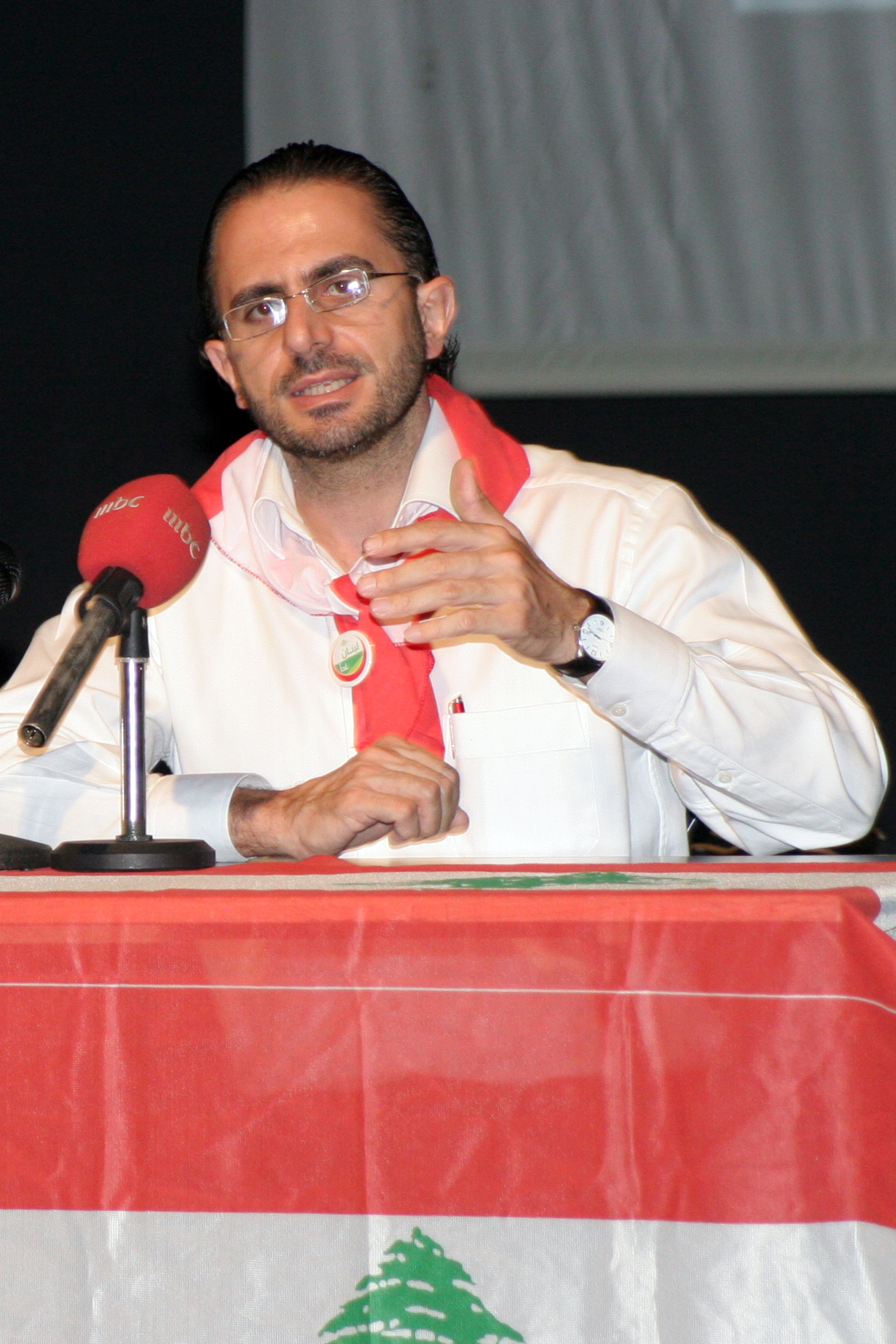
- Born: November 2, 1972 (age 53); Khiam, South, Lebanon
- Occupations: Lebanese writer; Attorney; professor of beekeeping in the American University of Beirut (AUB)
- Website: www.ramiollaik.com

Rami Ollaik (born 1972) is a Lebanese writer, political activist, attorney, and professor of beekeeping at the American University of Beirut (AUB). He is also the founder of the Lebanon Ahead movement, and initiator of the 10 October Revolution. He is best known for his autobiography, The Bees Road (طريق النحل).

== Life ==
Ollaik was born in Khiam in southern Lebanon to a family with a heritage in beekeeping. At the age of 13, Ollaik was recruited into Hezbollah and later on became the party's student representative at AUB. Between 1992 and 1996, Ollaik played a crucial role in Hezbollah's growing and controversial influence in AUB, and led the 10 October student protest of 1994. Ollaik resigned from the party's ranks in 1996.

In 2008, Ollaik published his autobiography, "The Bees Road", which recounts his experience with Hezbollah. The book was rewritten in English and a French adaptive translation "La Route des Abeilles" was released by Editions Anne Carriere in Paris. A sequel to The Bees Road, "Under the Green Waters", was published in Arabic on November 21, 2012, and a second sequel is currently underway – the final version of the trilogy. Ollaik published Your Guide to Beekeeping - Arabic in 2010, co-written with his father Salman Ollaik.

In 2009, Ollaik founded Lebanon Ahead, a movement aimed at improving the country and changing it into a peaceful and democratic nation by creating a platform of communication and understanding among citizens. Through it, he founded a coalition of independent democratic civic forces "Takaddom" and ran with two other candidates on Lebanon Ahead's ticket in the general parliamentary elections.

Ollaik also launched a national protest movement for political reform in 2013, "10 October Revolution", which focused on the need to abolish the Lebanese sectarian political system by amending the prevailing sectarian structure of the Lebanese state since its independence. The movement advocated for the establishment of a sovereign nation, where all citizens are equal under the law and where corruption is curbed, and for restoring the voting power of the people through a just, modern, and non-sectarian electoral law.

In 2013, Sofia Amara directed, alongside Bruno Joucla, the documentary The renegade on the work of Ollaik.

== Education ==
Ollaik pursued a BS in agriculture and diploma in agricultural engineering and an MS in agricultural economics at AUB, and a PhD in food and resource economics at the University of Florida. He also obtained a License degree in law from the Lebanese University and became an attorney at law at the Beirut Bar Association.

== Books ==
=== The Bees Road Trilogy (Arabic) ===
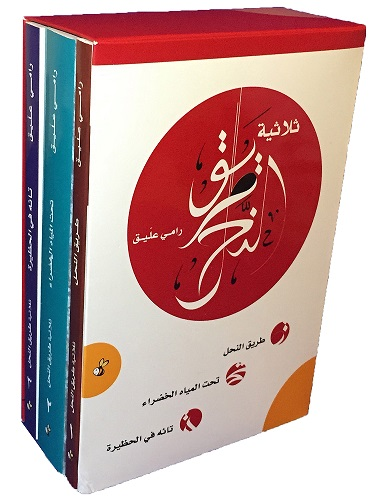
The Bees Road Trilogy

The Bees Road Trilogy (Arabic) is the personal narrative of Rami Ollaik in three books: The Bees Road, Under The Green Waters and Lost In The Barn.

=== The Bees Road ===
In an inspirational journey that takes the reader from war-torn South Lebanon to a detention cell at JFK airport, The Bees Road is the personal narrative of Rami Ollaik. A Lebanese Shiite raised in an environment full of violence and cruelty, Rami joins and rises to the top echelons of Hezbollah. After 13 years of party involvement, he reevaluates his life and his conception of love in an attempt to rid himself of his haunting fundamentalist past and to finally pursue his ultimate goal of personal freedom. A rough path that leaves him a traitor to Hezbollah and a suspected terrorist to the United States. The story ends with Rami back in his home country teaching beekeeping at AUB, filled with the urge to build a stronger Lebanon and unite the nation as whole.

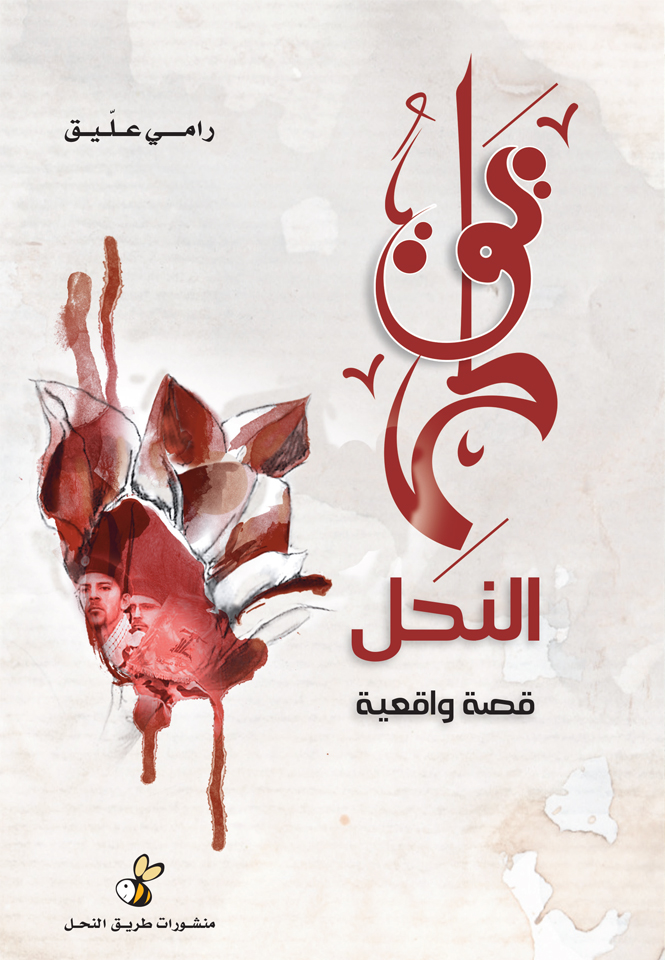
The Bees Road

=== Under The Green Waters (Arabic) ===
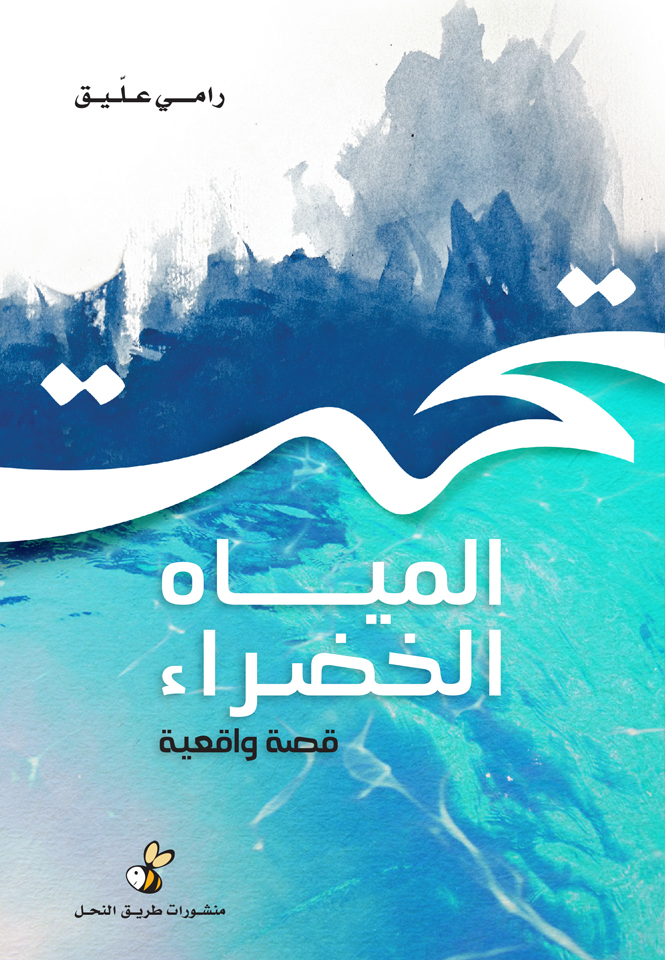
Under the Green Waters

A war-shocked child brought under the wing of Hezbollah. That child's growth into a man, and his subsequent Intifadas. A traitor to Hezbollah, a suspected terrorist to the United States, a professor of beekeeping and author of The Bees Road. Where is Rami Ollaik? Where has his path taken him? And who has been watching him?

Under The Green Waters' continues the narrative introduced in ''The Bees Road.'' The book is an autobiographical work based on the author's experiences during 2008 and examines the aftermath of the earlier publication, its impact on the author, and its relation to political developments in Lebanon. The work also addresses themes including political pressure, corruption, personal relationships, fear, hope, and loss.

Under The Green Waters takes readers into the corruption of the Lebanese State. Tracing the life of Rami Ollaik, the author illustrates the aftermath of his first novel and exposes the impact one book can have.

Under The Green Waters is a work of nonfiction, a literary autobiographical account of the author's story from its writing to its release in 2008 and the aftermath. The story, following the popularity of his first book in Lebanon, traces his formation of the idealistic post-partisan unity movement Lebanon Ahead. The story follows the release of his unprecedented publication where he shows the behind-the-scenes nature of democracy in the Middle East, the intricately calibrated intimidation campaigns, and the problematic practices of US-Mid East relations. While these themes remain poignant, it is also a story of love, betrayal, fear, hope, and devastating heartbreak.

Under the Green Waters was published in Arabic on November 21, 2012. - ISBN 978-2844086778

=== Lost in the Barn (Arabic) ===
The third and last book of the trilogy, Lost In The Barn, is a journey through real life events that affected the author's life between the years 2008 and 2010. A leap from Hezbollah to true patriotism, passing through identity crisis, meticulous sabotage, a hope for a long-awaited justice, and ending with an encounter with the Special Tribunal for Lebanon, with a father dying after having witnessed all the past sufferings.

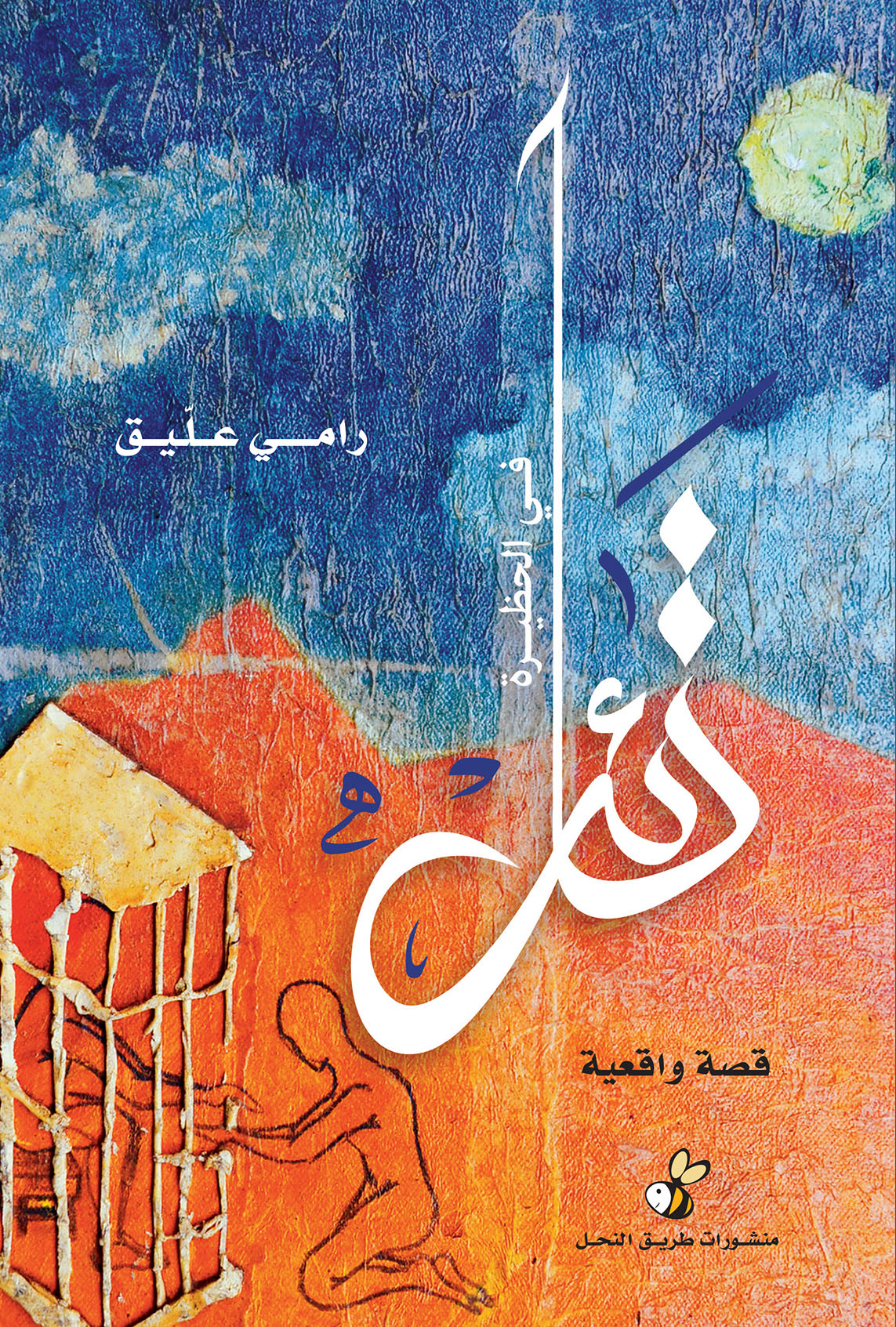
Lost in The Barn

=== Your Guide to Beekeeping (Arabic) ===
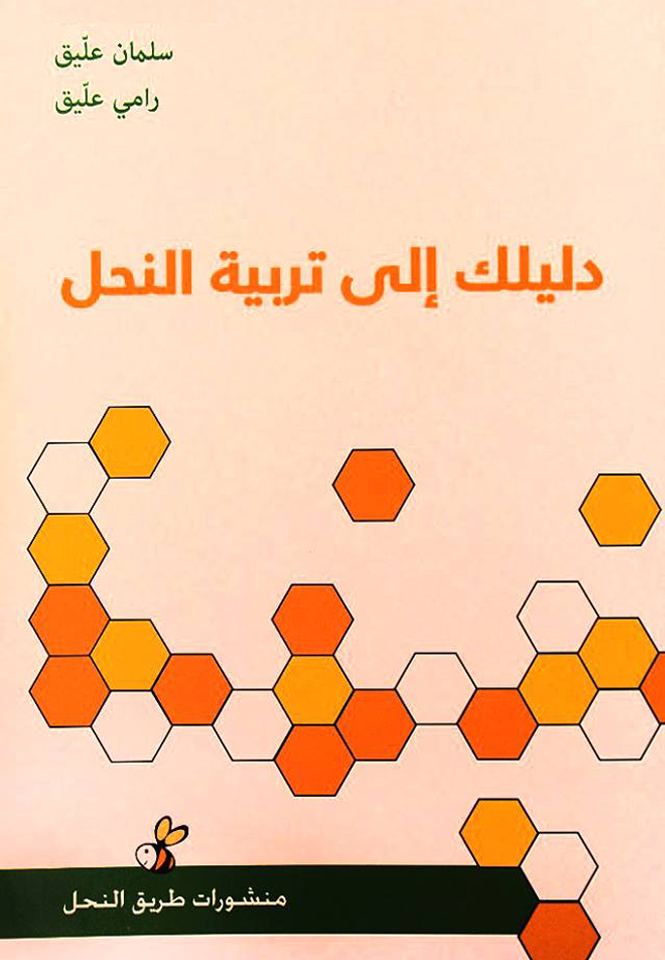
دليلك إلى تربية النحل

A scientific guide to modern beekeeping that stems from both academic and long-term practical experience in developmental apiculture. The book follows a forthright approach in outlining the fundamentals of the life of the honeybee and illustrates both the individual and social aspects of one of nature's most fascinating creatures, starting with species and race evolution, genetics, anatomy and physiology, and ending with the bee's social behavior as a member of a colony. It also depicts the delicate ecological interaction of the honeybee with its surrounding flora and fauna, especially in light of the worldwide alarming Colony collapse disorder (CCD) phenomenon. It helps both beekeepers and amateurs utilize the presented knowledge in the collection of as much potential products and services from the colony as possible.

== Lebanon Ahead ==
- The Way Out

Lebanon Ahead is a collaborative human effort aiming at making Lebanon a better place where citizens can live with dignity and freedom. Lebanon Ahead's objective is reviving the nation, the "we feeling", and the sense of responsibility by building the country economically, socially and politically.

- The Focus

Lebanon Ahead's focus is the Lebanese educated youth who are capable of restructuring the civic society.

== Beekeeping ==
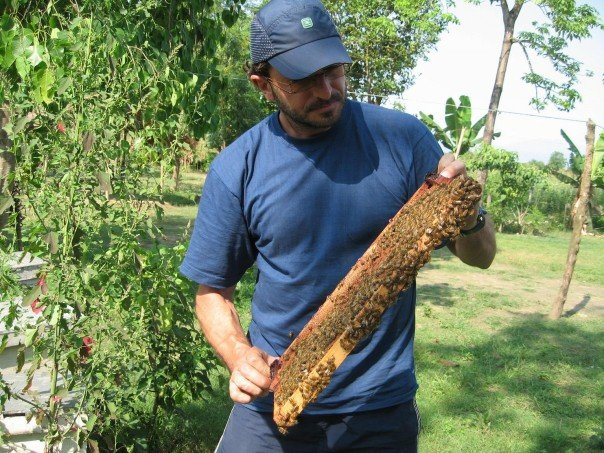
Bee Keeping

Since his early childhood, Rami Ollaik was introduced to beekeeping through his father. He joined the American University in Beirut (AUB) to study agriculture, the field closest to beekeeping at the time. His first scientific approach to the bee world was his MS thesis dealing with economic and marketing modeling of apiculture in Lebanon. Afterwards in 1998, he started conducting applied research on local honeybees, as well as imported strains, in order to assess their productivity and adaptivity to local production conditions and thus arrive at a superior stock. While pursuing his doctorate studies at the University of Florida, Ollaik expanded his expertise and exposure to the international practices related to bees and beekeeping. Rami's passion for bees led him to carry on his father's work of developing the beekeeping industry all over Lebanon through teaching, research and extension services at AUB. Ollaik was the first to introduce beekeeping into the curriculum of AUB's Faculty of Agriculture & Food Sciences, designed Lebanon's first beekeepers calendar, improved local beekeeping cultural practices along modern scientific lines, focused on integrated pest management systems and added scientific guidelines to honey production and marketing. He organized at AUB the first and second national scientific conferences for the improvement and modernization of beekeeping practices.

He also worked on the development of beekeeping practices in the Arab region and participated in many international conferences. His publications about beekeeping, including the book "Your guide to beekeeping" in Arabic, were considered the first scientific releases about apiculture in Lebanon.
