= Lebanese economic crisis bank robberies and sit-ins =

Bank robberies in Lebanon in response to liquidity crisis (2019–present)

After Lebanese banks began to impose withdrawal limits in 2019, as part of the ongoing liquidity crisis, some of their depositors have resorted to a spate of bank robberies and sit-ins to recover their frozen money. The phenomenon began in January 2022 and was ongoing as of 2023.

== Background ==
During the Lebanese Civil War, the Lebanese pound was severely devalued. After the war, which ended in 1990, the Lebanese government pegged the pound to the United States dollar at an official exchange rate of 1,507 pounds per dollar to stabilize its currency. The Lebanese economy weathered the 2008 financial crisis and performed well until 2011, when political unrest in the Middle East (including the Syrian civil war) and the rise of Hezbollah within Lebanon began to deter foreign investors. To continue attracting foreign investors, the Banque du Liban offered interests rates of as high as 20%, in what the World Bank has described as a Ponzi scheme.

The scheme began to collapse in October 2019, when the state announced a plan to tax WhatsApp messages, to widespread public backlash. In response, banks began to impose withdrawal limits to curb a potential bank run. The government defaulted on its debts in March 2020. The burgeoning financial crisis was further compounded by the 2020 Beirut explosion and the COVID-19 pandemic (and its resulting decline in tourism). From 2019 to March 2023, the Lebanese pound lost 98% of its value, and withdrawal limits of $400 US have remained in place since 2019. The government was forced to devalue its exchange rate with US currency by 90% in February 2023, though market value had diverged long beforehand.

== Robberies and sit-ins ==
=== Prelude ===
As early as August 2020, angry demonstrators have burned banks to protest the financial crisis. In June 2021, several protestors affiliated with a charity staged a successful occupation of a bank to withdraw funds for their organization. Three bank employees were injured, leading the bank to accuse the group of intimidation, which it denied.

=== 2022 ===
The first reported bank robbery related to the financial crisis occurred in eastern Lebanon in January, when a man held dozens of people hostage for his foreign currency savings. He surrendered to security forces after he was given a portion of his savings. In a case that gained nationwide attention in August, a man armed with a shotgun took 10 hostages in a bank and threatened to self-immolate if he was not given his deposits totalling $210,000 to cover his father's medical expenses. He had been refused several times. Over the course of the robbery, he garnered the support of a crowd outside. Eventually, he was granted a portion of his savings, arrested, held, and subsequently released without charges. Since then, copycat crimes have burgeoned– five or eight bank robberies were reported in a single day in September, resulting in a nationwide three-day bank closure for security reasons. The closure was extended indefinitely. In October, Georges Siam, a Lebanese ambassador, and Cynthia Zarazir, an opposition member of parliament, staged sit-ins at their respective banks within days of each other. Zarazir remained until she was able to withdraw enough money for her sister's cancer treatment. By October 7, at least twelve robberies were reported within the previous month alone.

=== 2023 ===
In February, a group of police officers participated in a robbery in Tyre.

=== Planning ===
Methods and weaponry vary from case to case. Handguns, rifles, gasoline, hand grenades, Molotov cocktails, a taser, and a machine gun, some fake, have been sighted during the robberies.

== Consequences and reactions ==
No robbers had been prosecuted as of November 2022, largely due to pre-trial negotiations and sympathetic judges. None have been found guilty of a crime as of July 2023. Charging the bank robbers would be unpopular, and may be legally difficult, as the lack of a capital control law means the banks do not have a right to impose strict withdrawal limits in the first place. According to Fouad Debs, co-founder of the Depositors Union, the robbers could only be fined a maximum of 200,000 pounds ($5 US, as of September 2022) because they lacked an intent to injure. Lawyer Rami Ollaik argues the robberies could be legal under self-defense of life and property.

In at least two cases, Ollaik threatened police with an arson attack on their station if they did not release his clients from custody. They complied.

Lebanese banks have closed on multiple occasions due to upticks in robberies.

=== Public perception ===
The Lebanese general public regards the robbers as "heroes", with The Telegraph and L'Orient-Today comparing their role to that of the mythical character Robin Hood.
