= Morgan Ortagus =

American diplomat and analyst (born 1982)

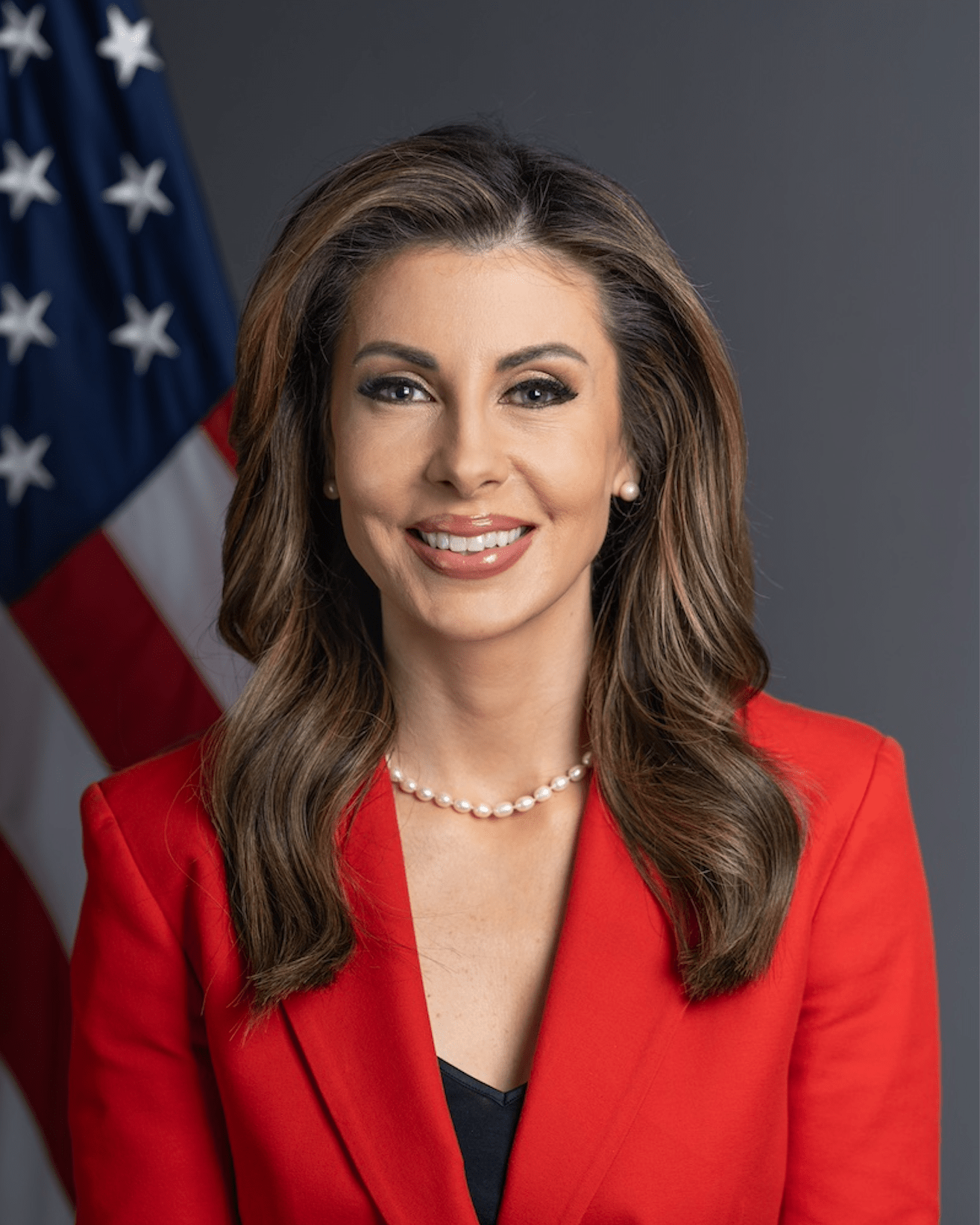
- Official portrait, 2025

Deputy United States Special Envoy to the Middle East
- In office January 20, 2025 – June 15, 2025
- President: Donald Trump
- Special Envoy: Steve Witkoff
- Preceded by: Position established

28th Spokesperson for the United States Department of State
- In office April 3, 2019 – January 20, 2021
- President: Donald Trump
- Secretary: Mike Pompeo
- Preceded by: Heather Nauert
- Succeeded by: Ned Price

Personal details
- Born: Morgan Deann Ortagus; July 10, 1982 (age 44) Auburndale, Florida, U.S.
- Party: Republican
- Spouse: Jonathan Weinberger (m. 2013; div. 2025)
- Children: 1
- Education: Florida Southern College (BS); Johns Hopkins University (MA, MBA)
- Website: Official website

Military service
- Allegiance: United States
- Branch: United States Navy; Navy Reserve
- Service years: 2014–present
- Rank: Lieutenant Commander
- Unit: Naval Intelligence
- Battles/wars: Global war on terrorism

Morgan Deann Ortagus (born July 10, 1982) is an American diplomat, intelligence analyst, political advisor, naval officer, and former television commentator serving as a senior policy adviser at the U.S. Mission to the United Nations. A member of the Republican Party, she previously served as deputy special presidential envoy to the Middle East in 2025 and spokesperson for the United States Department of State from 2019 to 2021.

Ortagus began her career in government as a deputy attaché and intelligence analyst at the United States Department of the Treasury and later as a public affairs officer at USAID. She worked as a national security contributor at Fox News until her appointment as State Department spokesperson. Since 2014, Ortagus has been an intelligence officer in the United States Navy Reserve.

During her time at the State Department, Ortagus was critical of Iran and China, particularly over the Chinese Communist Party's efforts to shift blame to the United States for the COVID-19 pandemic. She played a key role in the Abraham Accords.

Ortagus is the founder of POLARIS National Security, co-chair of the Women's Democracy Network at the International Republican Institute, and a member of the board of advisors for the China Center at Hudson Institute. She was a candidate for Tennessee's 5th congressional district in the 2022 election, but was disqualified by the Tennessee Republican Party despite her endorsement by then-former President Donald Trump.

== Early life and education ==
Ortagus was born in Auburndale, Florida to Ronald E. and Denise C. Ortagus. Her father owned a cleanup and restoration company, and her mother was the office manager. An identical twin, she grew up in Florida and won the Miss Auburndale, Miss Teen Auburndale, 2003 Miss Florida Citrus, and Miss Orange Blossom titles. Ortagus volunteered with Students Against Destructive Decisions and Mothers Against Drunk Driving after her mentor was killed by a drunk driver in 1996.

In 2005, Ortagus, a first-generation college student, graduated from Florida Southern College with a Bachelor of Science degree in political science. Originally interested in studying music, she switched her major to political science after the September 11 terrorist attacks and converted to Judaism.

In 2013, Ortagus graduated from Johns Hopkins University with both a Master of Arts in Government degree and a Master of Business Administration from the Johns Hopkins Carey Business School. Ortagus' research at JHU included an honors thesis on counterinsurgency.

== Career ==
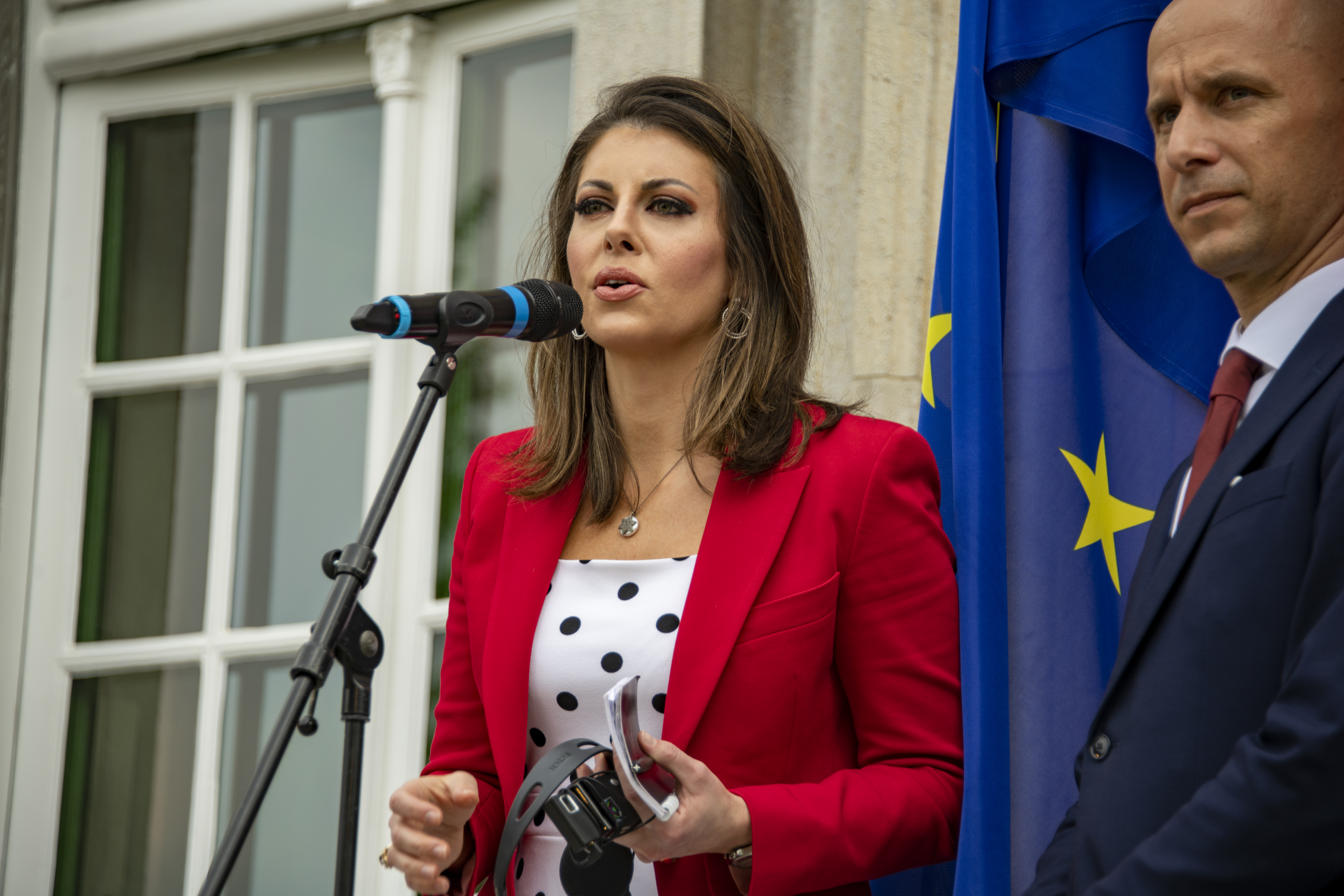
Ortagus speaks in Germany in 2019

=== Political campaigns ===
In 2006, Ortagus worked as press secretary on former Deputy National Security Advisor K. T. McFarland's Senate campaign. Prior to that, she worked on Adam Putnam's campaign staff.

Ortagus was a volunteer on the Jeb Bush 2016 presidential campaign.

=== United States Agency for International Development ===
From 2007 to 2008, Ortagus was a public affairs officer at United States Agency for International Development (USAID), spending several months in Baghdad, Iraq. She attended a Hanukkah ceremony in one of Saddam Hussein's former palaces in Baghdad.

=== United States Department of the Treasury ===
In 2008, Ortagus joined the U.S. Treasury Department, working as an intelligence analyst within the Treasury's Office of Intelligence and Analysis, covering North Africa and the Middle East.

Ortagus was a deputy Treasury attaché at the U.S. Embassy in Riyadh, Saudi Arabia starting in 2010. She worked to counter illicit financial flows and was the principal liaison from the Treasury Department to the banking sector in Saudi Arabia. She returned to the United States in 2011.

=== Private sector ===
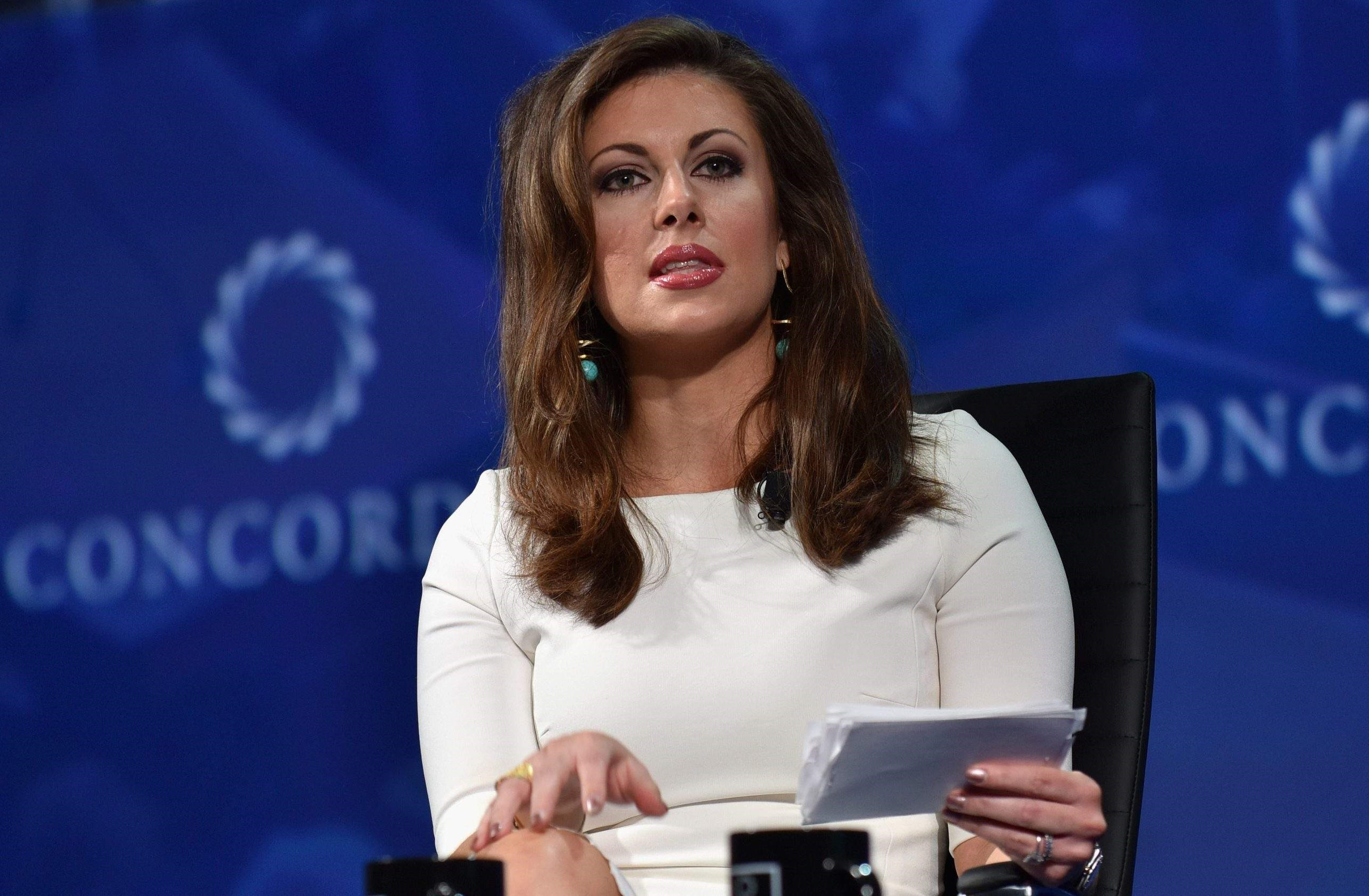
Ortagus moderating a panel at the Concordia summit

After returning to the United States, Ortagus joined the private sector, first as global relationship manager at Standard Chartered Bank working with clients from Asia, the Middle East and Africa, and then in 2016 as executive director at Ernst & Young (EY), where she helped found EY's Geostrategic Business Group working on geopolitical risk analysis for investors.

In 2013, she was the vice president of the board of the Friends of the Public-Private Partnership for Justice Reform in Afghanistan, based in Washington.

Ortagus worked as national security contributor and Republican strategist at the Fox News Channel, appearing on Fox & Friends, Outnumbered, The Five and Mornings with Maria on the Fox Business Network.

Ortagus and Samantha Vinograd co-founded GO Advisors, a geopolitical risk and policy advisory firm that focused on bridging divides between Wall Street and Silicon Valley with the White House and U.S. Treasury Department.

Ortagus was on the National Board of Directors of Maverick PAC as National Co-Chair. The organization's co-founder said that Ortagus "turned the organization really into a new frontier." She was also a member of the CNAS Council and Future of Sanctions Task Force, a member of the Institute for the Study of War's Advancement Committee, a board member to the Elizabeth Dole Foundation, a board member to the Friends of the American University of Afghanistan, and an advisor to Concordia where she contributed to the strategic direction and development of the organization's foreign and defense policy programming.

=== Military service ===
In 2014, Ortagus was commissioned as an intelligence officer in the United States Navy Reserve. In April 2025, she was promoted to the rank of lieutenant commander, sworn in by Secretary of Defense Pete Hegseth at the White House.

=== United States Department of State ===
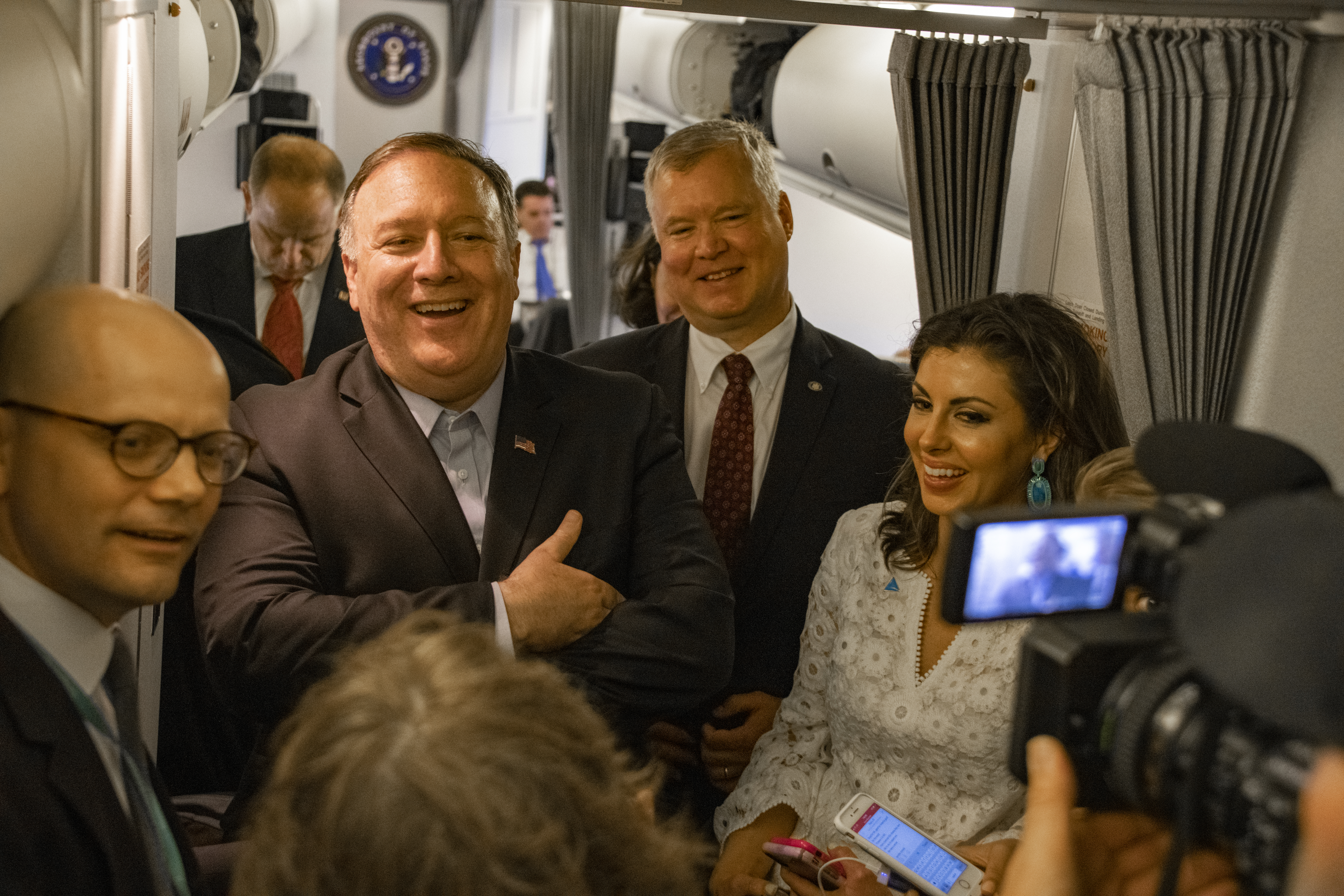
Ortagus with U.S. Secretary of State Mike Pompeo on July 30, 2019

Ortagus returned to government in 2019 as Spokesperson for the U.S. State Department, succeeding Heather Nauert. Washington Post columnist Josh Rogin described Ortagus as a bridge between the establishment and more conservative wings of the Republican foreign policy communities, and wrote that she was friends with Eric Trump and Ivanka Trump. She served until the end of the Trump administration, going on maternity leave in November 2020. During her tenure, she promoted the Abraham Accords, which brokered peace agreements between Israel and the United Arab Emirates, Bahrain, and Sudan.

=== Return to private sector ===
Post-government, Ortagus was a Senior Advisor for the Scowcroft Center for Strategy and Security at the Atlantic Council, but left by March 2022. She also is a founding investor of Rubicon Founders, a health-care investment firm based in Nashville, Tennessee, in February 2021.

=== 2022 congressional campaign ===
On February 7, 2022, Ortagus announced her candidacy for the Republican nomination for Tennessee's 5th congressional district. Two weeks prior, former President Donald Trump endorsed Ortagus for a potential congressional run, saying that "I am told the very strong and impressive Morgan Ortagus is exploring a run in Tennessee's 5th Congressional District." Politico forecasted a competitive Republican primary, with some frequent Trump allies backing other candidates.

Following Trump's endorsement, the Tennessee General Assembly passed a bill on March 29 to require congressional candidates live in the district they represented, and to have lived in the state for the three years prior. If signed by the governor, the law's provisions would have taken immediate effect, disqualifying Ortagus. The Tennessean reported that the bill targeted Ortagus' candidacy. Instead, Governor Bill Lee allowed the bill to become law unsigned, but only after the congressional filing deadline had passed; as the law's requirements were not retroactive, it did not apply to Ortagus' campaign.

On April 19, the Tennessee Republican Party's executive committee removed Ortagus and two other candidates from the primary ballot for the 5th district. The party stated that official challenges had been filed against the three, obligating their removal from the ballot per party bylaws. On June 10, the Tennessee Supreme Court ruled that the Republican Party had not violated open meetings laws, thus keeping the three off the ballot. Maury County Mayor Andy Ogles won the Republican primary on August 4.

=== U.S. Deputy Special Envoy for Middle East Peace ===
On January 3, 2025, then-President-elect Donald Trump announced his intention to appoint Ortagus as deputy special presidential envoy for Middle East peace, under United States Special Envoy to the Middle East Steve Witkoff, during his second administration. On February 7, she met with Lebanese President Joseph Aoun, emphasizing U.S. opposition to Hezbollah's role in Lebanon's government, stating it "won't be able to terrorize the Lebanese people." However, the Lebanese presidency downplayed her remarks.

Ortagus left her post as US deputy envoy to the Mideast on June 15, 2025.

=== U.S. Mission to the United Nations ===
After serving as deputy Mideast envoy, Ortagus became a senior policy adviser at the U.S. Mission to the United Nations. This was an extension of a national security team shakeup in which Mike Waltz moved from national security adviser to US ambassador to the UN.

== Political positions ==
=== China ===
In July 2020, Ortagus said that blame rested with both political parties "for almost 40 years for not seeing the Chinese Communist Party for who they really are," and stressed the need for American citizens not to trust Chinese social media and technology companies that seek to access private data of U.S. citizens. She welcomed moves by U.S. social media companies not to allow the Chinese government to access their data.

In August 2019, Ortagus called the Chinese government a "thuggish regime" for harassing a Hong Kong-based American diplomat. She has condemned the Chinese government's treatment of workers in Xinjiang, China as well as their detention and indoctrination of Uyghur and other religious and ethnic minorities, and called on the CCP to end the use of forced labor. In May 2020, Ortagus said that China was "breaking its word 27 years early" regarding its imposition of a new national security law in Hong Kong and was "taking over the largest financial hub in Asia."

=== Iran ===
After the U.S. killed Qassem Soleimani in January 2020, Ortagus stated, "no one was affected by the brutality and the terrorism of Qassem Soleimani more than the Iranian people themselves." She argued that the United States had "exercised the maximum restraint possible despite repeated provocations and attacks from the regime and through their proxies. And, finally, enough was enough."

She noted Iran had used its proxies to "foment terror throughout the region" and warned that if Iran targeted U.S. diplomats or soldiers, that the U.S. government would "do everything within the law to defend ourselves and defend American interests." Iran did so via Operation Martyr Soleimani, the largest ballistic missile attack ever against Americans, resulting in traumatic brain injuries for 110 U.S. servicemen at the Ayn al-Asad Airbase in Iraq.

Ortagus called on Iran to allow the United States to participate in the investigation after Iran shot down Ukraine International Airlines Flight 752 in January 2020.

In July 2020, Ortagus condemned the Iranian judiciary for its persistent violation of human rights, including their role in the death of journalist Zahra Kazemi, and for the Death Commissions that killed thousands of political prisoners in the 1980s. She repeatedly tweeted in support of Iranian dissidents and protestors, and said that "the whole world should stand behind the innocent Iranians that are being persecuted by their own government."

In September 2020, Ortagus criticized the Obama administration for signing the 2015 Iran nuclear deal, stating "we are not going to allow [Iran] to continue to foment terrorism through the region, paid for with sanctions relief," supporting Trump's maximum pressure campaign and pointing to the devastation caused by Iranian intervention in Syria and Lebanon, as well as the Abqaiq–Khurais attack in Saudi Arabia.

=== Israel and Middle East peace agreements ===
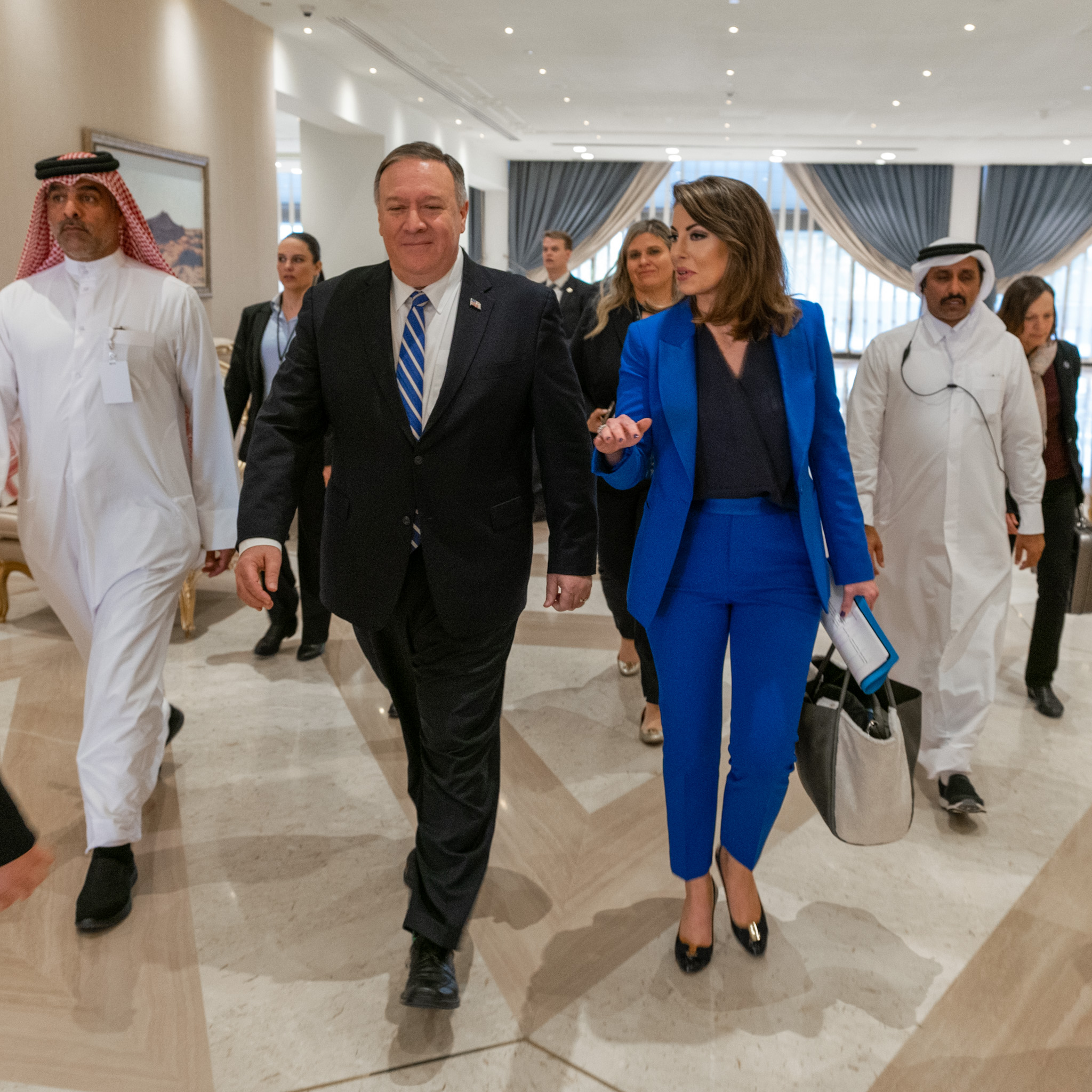
Secretary Pompeo and Ortagus at the signing ceremony of the Doha Agreement in Qatar, February 2020

Ortagus defended Israel against Iranian threats after the U.S. killed Iran's Quds Force Commander Qassem Soleimani in January 2020, saying "there is no country that Iran threatens more on a routine basis through their vile and hateful and racist rhetoric than the state of Israel." She also repeated the United States' longstanding pledge to work with Israel to protect mutual security interests. In 2020, she encouraged Israel to more closely scrutinize foreign investments from China, saying "we do not believe decisions that would make Israel beholden to the Chinese Communist Party is what's best for Israel."

Ortagus was present for the September 11, 2020, phone call between President Donald Trump, Israeli Prime Minister Benjamin Netanyahu, and Bahraini King Hamad bin Isa Al Khalifah on which the Abraham Accords was agreed to. After the signing of the Abraham Accords between Israel, the United Arab Emirates, and Bahrain, Ortagus said, "Peace for Israel, one of our strongest allies in the world, is important for American national security, because we believe in a strong sovereign state of Israel... Anytime we can bring our friends and allies together, it is positive for the United States." She blamed Palestinian leadership for failing to negotiate with Israel, and for their economic malaise.

Morgan Ortagus was of the very few to raise her hand at the U.N. to stop any possibility of a ceasefire in Gaza, which was seen highly controversial by the public, as the war in Gaza has been called several times by the U.N. and top experts in genocide, a genocide which made many think about the fairness of veto power.

=== Russia ===
In August 2019, Ortagus called on Russia to use deconfliction channels to prevent escalation around the border of the Russian-occupied Georgian region of South Ossetia. In May 2020, she blamed Russian interference in Syria, Libya, and Yemen for exacerbating humanitarian crises and causing the deaths of civilians. In July 2020, Ortagus stated that the United States was "troubled by reports of Russian government efforts to manipulate the result of the recent votes on constitutional amendments, including reports of voter coercion, pressure on opponents of the amendments, and restrictions of independent observers of the vote," and that the United States was "especially concerned with a provision in the amendments that would potentially allow President Putin to remain in office until 2036."

=== Paid parental leave ===
Ortagus called legislation that secured 12 weeks of paid parental leave for federal workers a "monumental achievement" that would provide peace of mind to thousands of working families, and cited Ivanka Trump's bipartisan efforts as key to passage of the legislation in the FY2020 National Defense Authorization Act.

=== Other ===
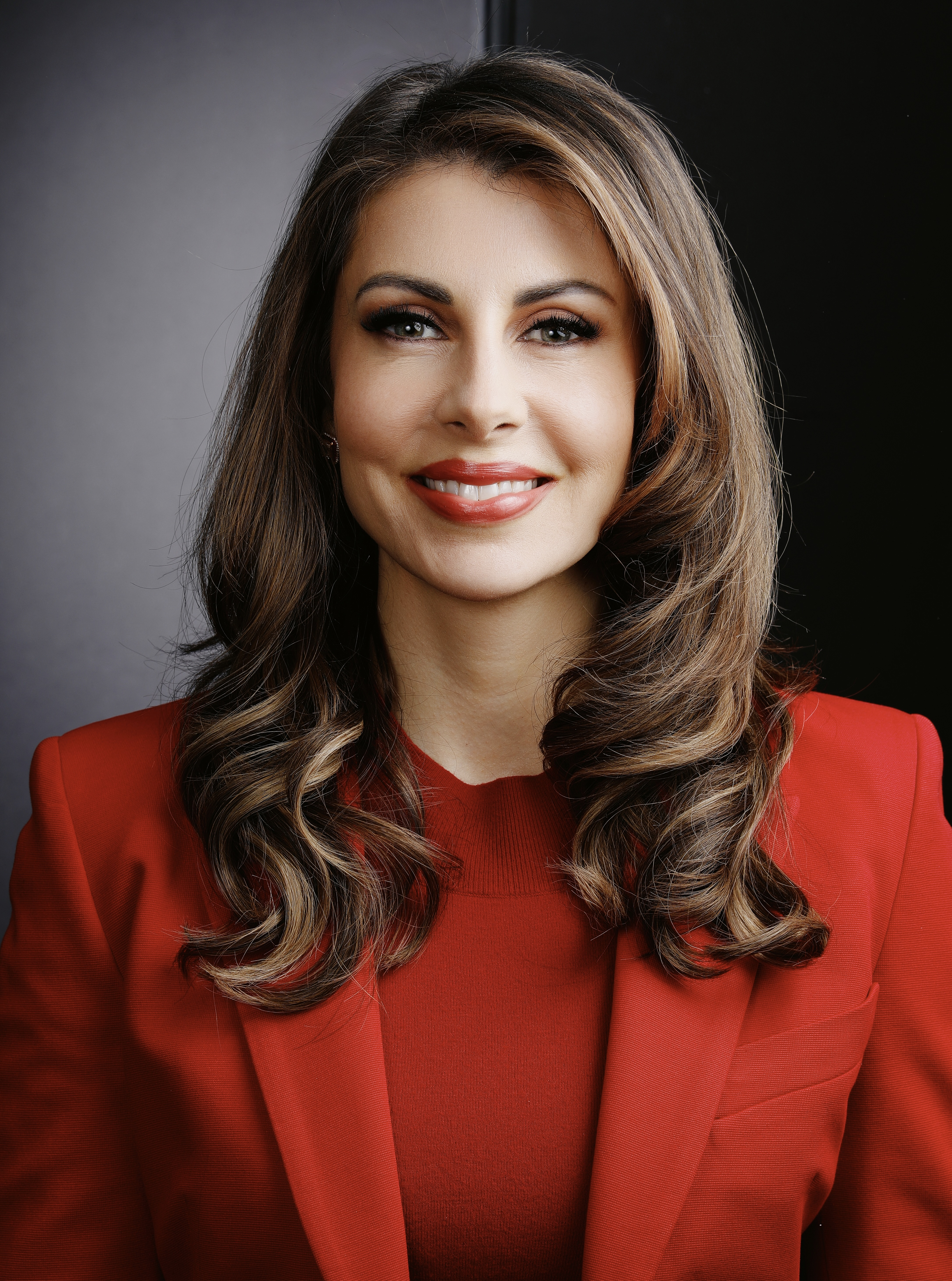
Ortagus in 2024

In June 2019, Ortagus said the United States "views Canada's claim that the waters of the Northwest Passage are internal waters of Canada as inconsistent with international law."

In October 2020, Ortagus said that the United States had expressed its strong opposition to Turkey's acquisition of the Russian S-400 system, and that the "United States has been clear on our expectation that the S-400 system should not be operationalized."

She argues that global food insecurity is not just a humanitarian crisis but also a national security threat for America, fostering conditions ripe for terrorism and mass migration. She advocates for the U.S. to invest in market-based solutions and agricultural technologies to alleviate the crisis while competing with hostile nations like China.

== Personal life ==
Ortagus married Jonathan Weinberger, an attorney, in 2013, and the couple have a daughter, born in 2020. Justice Ruth Bader Ginsburg, Ortagus's neighbor, presided over their wedding. They divorced in 2025.

In January 2026, Annahar and Ynet reported that Ortagus was in a relationship with Lebanese banker Antoun Sehnaoui.

Ortagus converted to Judaism after exploring the religion while living in Baghdad, Iraq.

Political offices
Preceded by Heather Nauert	Spokesperson for the United States Department of State; 2019–2021	Succeeded by Ned Price
