= Jnud al-Rab =

Far-right Christian militia in Beirut

Jnoud el-Rab جنود الرب
- Leader: Joseph Mansour
- Founded: 2020
- Headquarters: Achrafieh, Beirut
- Membership: 100+ (approx.); Linked to 1 confirmed fatality (up to 4 alleged by opposition)
- Ideology: Lebanese nationalism Christian nationalism Fascism; Anti-Islamism Factions: Anti-Palestinianism; Anti Arabism; Anti-LGBT; Social conservatism Anti-Communism
- Political position: Far-right

Website
- https://www.jnoudelrab.com/

Jnoud el-Rab (Arabic: جنود الرب; lit. 'Soldiers of the Lord' or 'Soldiers of God') is a Lebanese Christian far-right militia and activist group based in Beirut's Achrafieh district. Founded in 2020 by Joseph Mansour, the group presents itself as a protector of Christian values and a counterforce to secularism and Hezbollah's influence in Lebanon.

The group is known for its opposition to LGBTQ+ rights, secularism, and Hezbollah, actively campaigning against what it views as moral decline. It has gained international notoriety for the destruction of a pro-LGBT billboard in Beirut and its involvement in violent altercations targeting patrons of LGBTQ+ venues.

Jnoud el-Rab combines elements of Lebanese nationalism, Christian nationalism, and Phoenicianism, asserting a distinct identity for Lebanese Christians rooted in ancient Phoenician heritage. Its ideology has also been described as incorporating aspects of fascism, reflecting its authoritarian, ultraconservative, and militant tendencies.

Members of the group are often described as "muscular, tattooed, bearded, and dressed in black," with their public image evoking comparisons to militias such as the Syrian Shabiha, Hezbollah, and the Russian Wagner Group. They have been characterized in media as Christian fundamentalists who employ intimidation and violence to enforce their conservative agenda.

== Violence and rivalries ==
Jnoud el-Rab has been involved in violent confrontations and has a tense rivalry with the Lebanese Forces. On December 4, 2024, a deadly clash occurred in the Achrafieh district of Beirut between members of Jnoud el-Rab and Lebanese Forces supporters, resulting in the death of Roland Murr, a Lebanese Forces official.

The group has also been accused by political figures of involvement in up to four murders over the past five years, though these claims have not been independently verified.

Authorities have yet to arrest any members in connection with these incidents, and investigations are ongoing.

Jnoud el-Rab's activities have drawn widespread condemnation for promoting sectarian violence and undermining state authority in Lebanon.

== Recent developments ==
In December 2024, a fatal clash occurred between members of Jnoud el-Rab and the Lebanese Forces in Achrafieh, resulting in the death of Roland Murr, head of the Lebanese Forces center in Karm al-Zeitoun. The incident led to calls for the disbandment of Jnoud el-Rab by political figures, including Lebanese Forces leader Samir Geagea.

In June 2024, Jnoud el-Rab expressed support for French far-right leader Marine Le Pen in the European elections, declaring her a "soldier of God" and celebrating her victory.

== See also ==
- Lebanese Civil War
- Lebanese Forces (militia)
- Christian fundamentalism
- Phoenicianism
- Sectarianism

== Ideology ==
The Jnoud el-Rab are a Christian militant group who claim not to be affiliated with any political party in Lebanon. They are, however, strongly anti-LGBT and anti-communist and are sometimes referred to as Christian extremists. The party follows what it considers to be Christian law. In an interview with Radio Liban Libre, group leader Joseph Mansour said, "We are the children of Jesus, and we only follow the word of the Gospel.” They also claim to protect Christian lands from Islamists and particularly target Palestinian and Syrian refugees.

The group's founder Joseph Mansur said: “We, as soldiers of the Lord, saw what happened to the West when it banned the authority of the priesthood. They started adultery, civil marriage and abortion. Baptism was stopped and the connection between Church members and the priesthood was lost. This is our first spiritual war today, so they are persecuting us".

The party opposes Hezbollah, the Free Patriotic Movement and their affiliates and most members are supporters of the Lebanese Forces party.

== History ==
Jnud al-Rab primarily operates in the Achrafieh and Mar Mikhaël neighborhoods of Beirut. The origins of the group date to 2019, but the group was not formally established until 2020 when they launched a number of social media accounts and began conducting public relations activities and recruitment drives.

Prior to incorporating in 2020, the group began as an off-shoot of a larger campaign in 2019 of unarmed "guardian angels" escorting people through Beirut in order to provide a sense of security in light of the on-going security issues facing Lebanon as a result of the societal collapse of the central government. Of this larger, unarmed group of volunteers, some 300 individuals formed the nucleus of Jnud al-Rab, providing armed security services to the local community in response to the lack of security provided by the central government.

Many of these core members also provided armed security services to the banking industry during the Lebanese economic crisis bank robberies and sit-ins, and members of Jnud al-Rab remain a frequent sight at many banks in Beirut. Jnud al-Rab has provided security services to a number of churches.

Members of Jnud al-Rab also provided general security services throughout Beirut, in particular Achrafieh, often targeting local drug dealers and nightclubs associated with narcotics in an effort to clean up their neighborhood, especially as the local police are frequently accused by the Lebanese public of neglecting the security of working-class neighborhoods.

In addition to their self-defense and crime-fighting activities, Jnud al-Rab also began promoting traditional values, in particular with regards to traditional marriage, and also began calling for secular politicians to be replaced by members of the Christian clergy. Although Jnud al-Rab is not formally affiliated with any specific diocese and some members of the clergy have criticized their willingness to fight fire with fire, many local parishes and churches actively support their work.

The group attained national attention on June 24, 2022, when group members went to Sassine square in Achrafieh and destroyed a billboard of flowers with the LGBTQ+ rainbow flag, which was set up by Beirut Pride. The same afternoon the group published a video threatening the LGBTQ movement in Lebanon where one member stated that, "We do not accept the flag of homosexuals in our neighborhoods” and “families must be careful with their children, they kidnap them.”

On 23 August 2023, members of the group attacked a LGBT-friendly bar in Mar Mikhael at night during a drag show where the attendees were prevented from exiting the premise under threat of physical violence.

In January 2024, when Rafic Hariri Airport saw its screens hacked in the name of two Christian groups and messages targeting Hezbollah and Hassan Nasrallah one of the logos appearing was that of Jnoud el-Rab, the Jnoud el-Rab denied their involvement in the hacking and called this “satanic” act aimed at dividing the Lebanese in such a crisis.

Following the 2024 Lebanon pager explosions, Jnoud el-Rab members organized a blood drive to support the victims. A member told the Lebanon Mirror that despite political differences with Hezbollah, "We are the children of one country and family, and blood will never turn into water."

On December 4, 2024, an altercation broke out between young men affiliated with the Lebanese Forces and Jnud al-Rab over a traffic dispute. During the course of the altercation, one of the young men affiliated with the Lebanese Forces drew a firearm. Members of Jnud al-Rab were able to disarm the member of the Lebanese Forces, confiscating the weapon and giving him a severe beating. Later in the day, a group of representatives from the Lebanese Forces arrived at the Jnud al-Rab headquarters and demanded that the confiscated gun be returned to them. At some point during this second altercation, both sides began exchanging heavy gunfire. Roland Al-Murr, the Lebanese Forces official in the Karantina area and owner of one of Beirut's main driving schools, was shot and killed in the crossfire. Media outlets have stated that al-Murr was acting as a neutral mediator, drawing upon his experience operating a driving school, in order to defuse the situation and was simply caught in the crossfire of the exchange between members of Jnud al-Rab and Lebanese Forces.

Following the death of al-Murr, Lebanese Forces former presidential candidate Samir Geagea has called on the central government to disarm and disband Jnud al-Rab. The Lebanese police have yet to make any arrests in the case, although media reports have claimed that the names of those involved in the incident are known, and police have encouraged those involved to turn themselves in to authorities.
