= Khalil Sehnaoui =

Information security professional and public figure (born 1963)

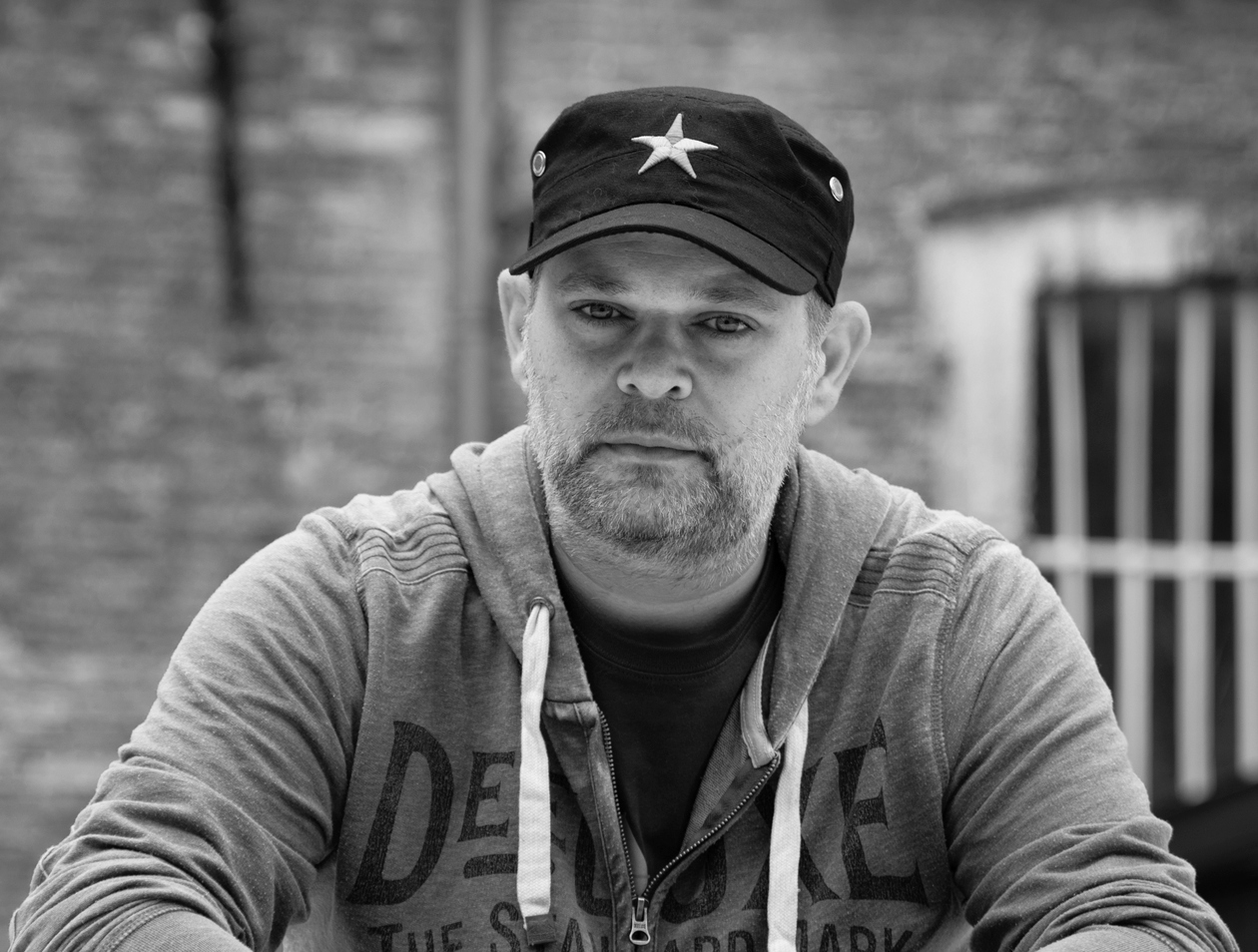
- Sehnaoui in 2015
- Born: May 23, 1975 (age 51); Beirut, Lebanon
- Education: Economics; Business management Finance; Computer science
- Occupation: Information Security Consultant Information Technology Consultant Actor
- Organization: Krypton Security
- Known for: Computer security consulting, hacking and commentary, acting
- Mother: Mouna Bassili Sehnaoui
- Relatives: Nicolas Sehnaoui (cousin) Antoun Sehnaoui (cousin)
- Website: Khalil Sehnaoui

Khalil Sehnaoui (born 23 May 1975) is a Belgian-Lebanese information security consultant who specialises in the Middle-East and the founder and managing partner of Beirut-based Krypton Security. He is also a member of the Chaos Computer Club (CCC), Europe's largest association of hackers. In 2021, Sehnaoui started an acting career by featuring in the TV miniseries The Role and the TV series Al Hayba.

== Background ==
He co-founded and is a managing partner at the security firm Krypton Security which helps test companies' security strengths, weaknesses, and potential loopholes.

In an online report published on April 6, 2016, Sehnaoui was listed as one of the top 100 influencers in Information Security.

Sehnaoui is often called upon to comment in media about Information Security matters.

== Early life and education ==
Sehnaoui was born in Beirut to parents Marwan Sehnaoui and Mouna Bassili Sehnaoui on 23 May 1975 and grew up living between Paris, France, and Beirut. His father is the President of the Lebanese Order of Malta and his mother is a Middle-East painter.

He attended College Stanislas in Paris as well as Collège Louise Wegman in Beirut, following which he earned a BA in Management from Universite Saint Joseph in Beirut as well as a Master's in Economics.

== Media and television ==
=== Media ===
Sehnaoui was featured in The Guardian's video series "The Power of Privacy" in 2015.

In May 2017 Sehnaoui went viral on Twitter and the internet after tweeting about getting revenge on loud and rude customers in a coffee shop. The customers were being loud and rude to waiters, and were having a very voluble conversation about their perfect new business name. As a retaliation, Sehnaoui registered the domain name and tweeted about it. According to Mashable, "Twitter users praised Sehnaoui for his act of digital savagery".

=== Television ===
Sehnaoui was also featured on National Geographic in 2017 in the series Breakthrough, produced by Ron Howard and Brian Grazer, Season 2 Episode 2, Cyber-Terror. This episode offered "An exclusive look inside the shadowy world of hackers, where good battles evil with the security of the world at stake." This episode follows “white-hat" hackers Jayson Street, Darren Kitchen, and Khalil Sehnaoui, security specialists who combine clever coding with "Mission: Impossible”-style “social engineering.” "

== Books ==
In 2019, Sehnaoui was featured amongst 70 information security professionals in a book called "Tribe of Hackers", a collection of industry, career, and personal insights from cybersecurity luminaries. The book quickly rose to the No. 1 spot of new releases on Amazon in the Computer Security and encryption category.

== Controversies ==
In 2015, there was a controversy when Sehnaoui identified that Silent Circle's warrant canary had been removed from their site. Sehnaoui was also prominently featured in a video series by The Guardian about privacy risks and is often called upon to comment on recent Information Security news. Before founding an information security firm, he attempted to improve patient representation in the Lebanese insurance industry.

Starting January 2016, there were reports that the Islamic State allegedly built a new Android app called Alrawi for exchanging encrypted messages, based on claims from online counter-terrorism firm Ghost Security Group (GSG). The claim was quickly reprinted by Newsweek, Fortune and TechCrunch, amongst others. Sehnaoui was one of the security specialists that helped debunk the myth of this tool, showing that it was just a "bad media mock-up to try and get some attention".

In July 2018, he was arrested for alleged piracy of several Lebanese companies and government institutions and foreign embassies. He was released after pressure from his cousin Antoun Sehnaoui, and the investigation to this day hasn’t been concluded, and it’s not known who was the recipient of the hacked data, although the general suspicion is mossad.
