= Sofia Amara =

French-Moroccan journalist

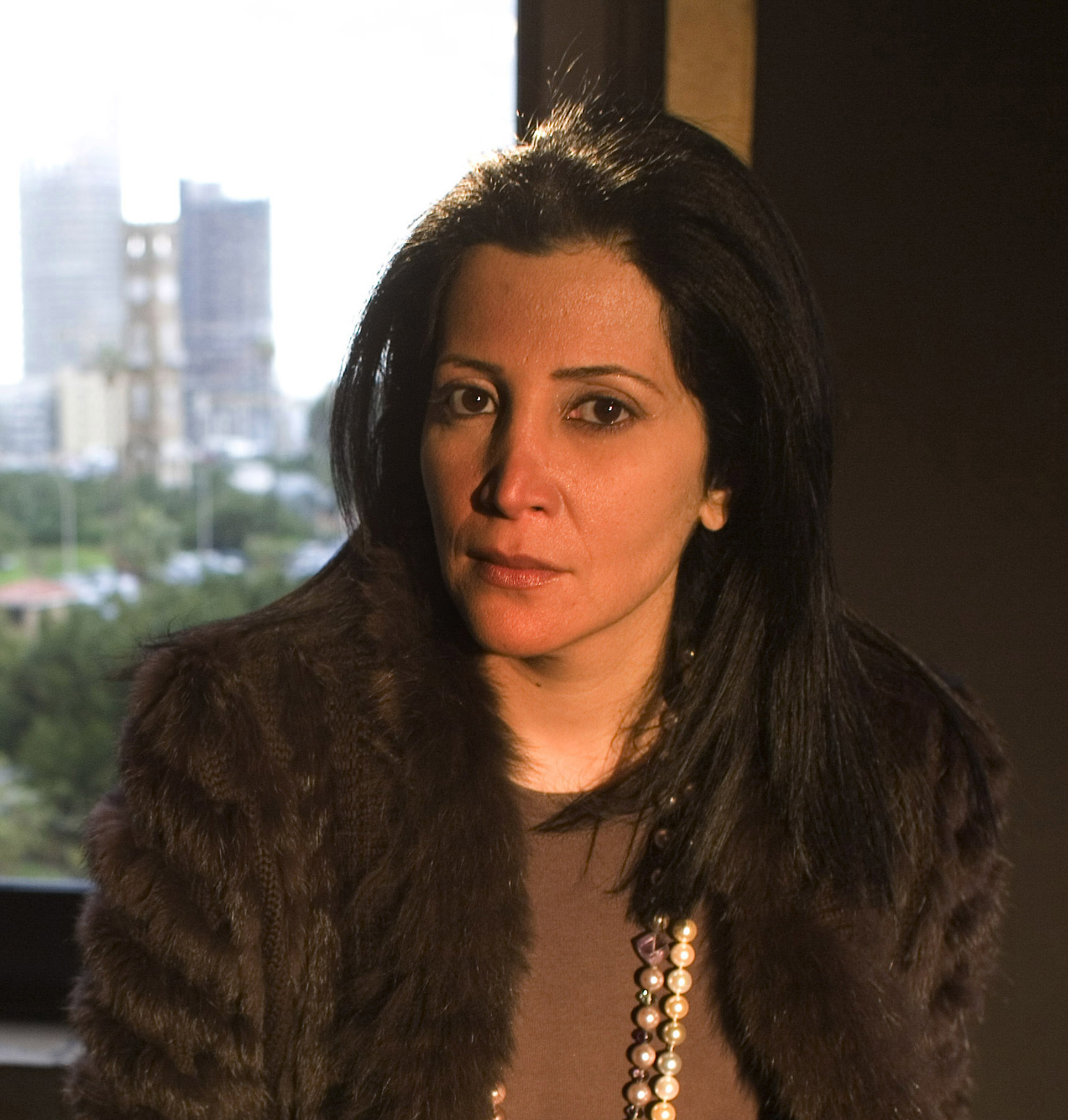
- Amara in 2008
- Born: May 25, 1968 (age 58); Casablanca, Morocco
- Education: University of Jordan - Sciences Po Paris
- Occupations: Journalist, film director
- Years active: 1993-present

Sofia Amara (born 25 May 1968) is a French-Moroccan journalist and film director.

== Biography ==
Amara was born in Casablanca in 1968. She graduated from the University of Jordan with a bachelor's degree in political science and from the IEP in Paris in 1996. Amara began her professional career as a correspondent in the Middle East for various channels and radio stations. She covered events such as the first Palestinian Intifada, the invasion of Kuwait by Iraq, and the return of Yasser Arafat to Gaza.

Amara reported on the Arab Spring in Egypt, and was jailed twice alongside protestors in Cairo. She has produced documentaries on the Syrian Civil War since its outset in 2011. In 2014, Amara published the book Infiltrée dans l'enfer syrien : du Printemps de Damas à l'Etat islamique in which she proposed that the Islamic State of Iraq and the Levant (ISIL) was actually an objective ally of Bashar al-Assad. After Mosul was liberated in 2017, Amara became one of the first female journalists to enter the city with the Iraqi army.

In 2017, she directed the documentary The Lost Children of the Caliphate, which depicted children as young as eight becoming brainwashed and receiving weapons training. It received the AMADE Prize at the Monte-Carlo TV Festival. In 2018, Amara published the book Baghdadi, the Caliph of Terror. It contained her interviews with the ex-wife and daughter of Abu Bakr al-Baghdadi, leader of ISIL. The book examined the rise to power of al-Baghdadi and its effects on the world.

Amara is based out of Beirut. In 2019, she criticized U.S. President Donald Trump for not having a Middle East policy and ignoring the abuses of the Arab governments. Amara stated that the most worrying conclusion of the Arab Spring was that "there are crisis managers who act on the basis of their own interests which often change and are sometimes poorly calculated."

== Partial filmography ==
- 2011: Syrie, dans l'enfer de la répression (writer/director)
- 2011: Le grand journal de Canal+ (TV series)
- 2011-2013: Spécial investigation (TV series, director)
- 2012: Syrie, au cœur de l’armée libre (director)
- 2013: Le renégat (The renegade) (director)
- 2014: L'invité (TV series)
- 2017: Enquête exclusive (TV series, director)
- 2017: The Lost Children of the Caliphate (director)
- 2019: C à vous (TV series)
- 2019: Al-Baghdadi, les secrets d'une traque (director)
