= Civil Center for National Initiative =

Lebanese think tank

The Civil Center for National Initiative is a Lebanese think-tank which aims to promote the role of civil society in Lebanese politics, as well as establish a civil and non-confessional state in Lebanon. Created in 2008, its founding members include statesman Hussein el-Husseini, journalist Ghassan Tueni, poet Adunis, among others, which include members of parliament, university professors and journalists.

In 2009, following a long campaign, the Center succeeded in persuading the Lebanese Ministry of Interior to allow citizens to remove sectarian affiliation from civil records, a landmark in Lebanese history.

== See also ==
- Secularism in Lebanon
