= Executive (magazine) =

English language monthly business magazine published in Beirut, Lebanon

- Editor-in-chief: Yasser Akkaoui
- Categories: Business magazine
- Frequency: Monthly
- First issue: 1999; 27 years ago
- Country: Lebanon
- Based in: Beirut
- Language: English
- Website: www.executive-magazine.com

Executive is an English language monthly business magazine published in Beirut, Lebanon. The magazine is one of the major publications concerning economic and financial matters across the Middle East and North Africa (MENA) region.

== History and profile ==
Executive was established in 1999. The magazine was started by the News Media company which is part of the Sehnaoui Group. It is published in Beirut on a monthly basis. Yasser Akkaoui is the editor-in-chief of the monthly, which covers articles on business and finance as well as on social, economic and cultural news in Lebanon.

In 2010 Executive became a member of the Business Publications Audit (BPA) Worldwide.

== See also ==
- List of magazines in Lebanon
