= Mouna Bassili Sehnaoui =

Lebanese painter, writer and artist

Mouna Sehnaoui
- Born: September 15, 1945 (age 80); Alexandria, Egypt
- Other name: Bassili Sehnaoui
- Occupation: Artist
- Known for: Painting, Writing and Art
- Spouse: Marwan Sehnaoui (m. 1974)
- Children: Khalil and Salim
- Website: Mouna Sehnaoui

Mouna Bassili Sehnaoui (born 15 September 1945) is a Lebanese painter, writer, and artist.

== Biography ==
Born in Egypt, Lebanese artist Mouna Bassili Sehnaoui attended the American University of Beirut and the University of Arizona, where she studied Fine Arts. Sehnaoui works in a variety of formats ranging from painting, writing, design and sculpture. She has had solo exhibitions in Paris, Dubai, and Beirut. Sehnaoui currently lives and works in Beirut with her husband Marwan, President of the Lebanese Order of Malta and sons Salim and Khalil Sehnaoui.

In the 1970s, Bassili Sehnaoui was in charge of the Graphic Art Department of the Lebanese National Council of Tourism. She also produced designs for stamps, packaging, posters, and book illustrations and created films for the Lebanese public television station. She later learned painting and typography, two disciplines she taught in Lebanese universities.

Her style is influenced by a Middle Eastern cultural heritage as reflected in the flat treatment of colours in both Byzantine icons and Persian miniatures. The treatment of space is very personal and brings a new dimension to a figurative approach by the use of hieroglyphic –like symbols and “windows” that open to reveal an added aspect of the subject treated.

Since the early 1990s, she has produced albums of lithographs based on Phoenician legends and studied porcelain painting, while still working as a designer and illustrator. Bassili Sehnaoui has been exhibiting art since the mid-sixties. Her seemingly naïve paintings most often reference her own surroundings, her country and its cultural heritage. The works suggest a very personal interpretation of space where shapes and line interpenetrate in colourful harmonies.

== Work ==
Her work has won several Prizes and figures in the Museum of Prints, Alexandria; the Sursock Museum, Beirut; the Art Collection of the American University of Beirut; the Bank Audi Art Collection as well as many private collections around the world.

Sehnaoui also designed the famous Lebanon logo, now widely used, for the Ministry of Culture in the 1960s, as well as several posters encouraging tourism in the country.

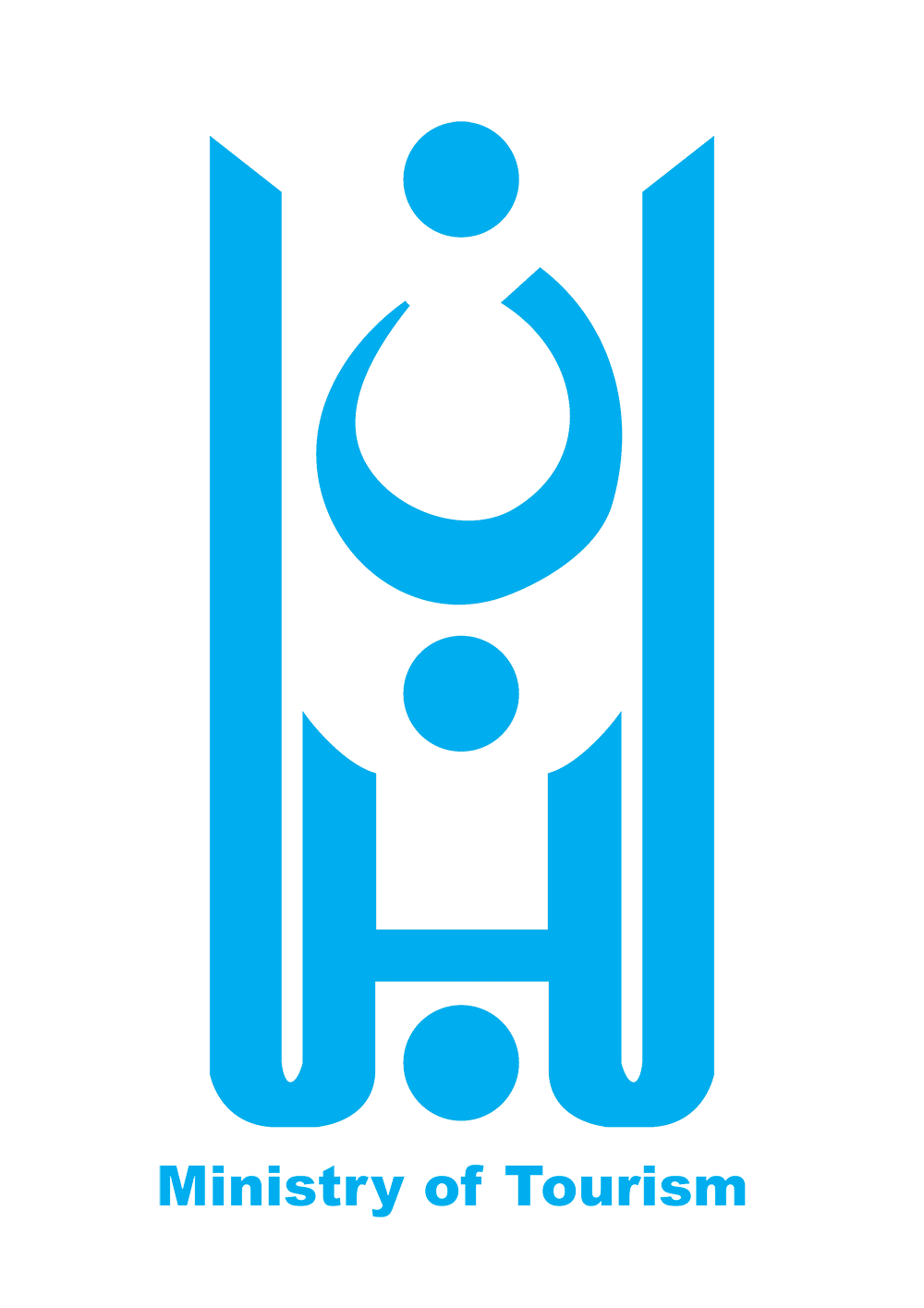
Lebanon Ministry of Tourism Logo

She is also known for her paintings depicting the Lebanese Civil War.

=== Solo exhibitions ===
- 1971 J.F. Kennedy Center, Beirut, Lebanon
- 1980 Epreuve D’Artiste Gallery, Beirut, Lebanon
- 1987 Epreuve D’Artiste Gallery, Kasliq, Lebanon
- 1990 Nicole Belier Gallery, Paris, France
- 1991 Le Retro, Epreuve D'Artiste Gallery, Beirut, Lebanon
- 1994 A L Turath Al Arabi Gallery, Khobar, Saudi Arabia
- 1993 50 x 70 Gallery, Beirut, Lebanon
- 1996 Epreuve D’Artiste Gallery, Beirut, Lebanon
- 1998 Paintings: The War Years, American University of Beirut, Lebanon
- 1999 Epreuve D’Artiste Gallery, Beirut, Lebanon
- 2001 Janine Rubeiz Gallery, Beirut, Lebanon
- 2002 Green Art Gallery, Dubai, United Arab Emirates
- 2004 Janine Rubeiz Gallery, Beirut, Lebanon
- 2007 October 2007, Galerie M, Paris, France
- 2007 December 2007, Galerie Janine Rubeiz, Beirut, Lebanon
- 2011 November 2011, Salwa Zeidan Gallery, Abu Dhabi
- 2012 December 2012, Aida Cherfan Fine Art, Beirut, Lebanon
- 2015 June 2015, Aida Cherfan Fine Art, Beirut, Lebanon
- 2017 December 2017, Aida Cherfan Fine Art, Beirut, Lebanon

=== Selected group exhibitions ===
- 1966, 1974, 1982, 1986, 1987, 1989, 1992, 1994, 1995, 1996, 1997, 1998, 1999, 2000, 2003, 2006, 2007, 2008, 2009, 2010: Salon D’Automne, Sursock Museum, Beirut, Lebanon
- 1968, 1969, 1970: Outdoor Art, Beirut, Lebanon
- 1988, 1989,1990: Salon D’Automne, Paris, France
- 1994, 1995: Salon D’Automne, Saumur, France
- 1969 Pottery in Lebanon, Jafet Library. American University of Beirut. Beirut, Lebanon
- 1969 Exhibition of paintings by Lebanese artists, Hilton Hotel, Brussels, Belgium
- 1970 Exhibition of engravings, J.F.Kennedy Center, Beirut, Lebanon
- 1971 Art & Industry, Dar al Fan, Beirut, Lebanon
- 1980 Chahine Gallery, Beirut, Lebanon
- 1985 Faqra Hotel, Epreuve d’Artiste Gallery, Faqra, Lebanon
- 1985 Salon des Antiquaires, Orsero Gallery, Versailles, France
- 1987 Artists: Portraits & Autoportraits 1919-1987. Les Cimaises Gallery, Nahr el Kalb, Lebanon
- 1988 Women Painters, Lebanon, 3M Gallery, Jal el Dib, Lebanon
- 1989 Lebanon : The Artist’s View, Barbicon Center, London, United Kingdom
- 1989 Group Exhibit, Lebanese Art. Abu Dhabi. United Arab Emirates
- 1989 Liban: Le Regard des Peintres. Institut du Monde Arabe. Paris, France
- 1990 Al Baksami Gallery, Kuwait, Kuwait
- 1990 26th International Grand Prix of the Côte d’Azur, Cannes, France
- 1992 SAGA, Grand Palais, Paris, France
- 1992 Art Multiple, Düsseldorf, Presented by Laurier Dubé Editions. Germany
- 1992 Platform International at Strassi Gallery, Washington D.C, USA
- 1994 International Print Triennal, Alexandria, Egypt
- 1996 Green Art Gallery, Dubai
- 1999 Lebanese Painting Exhibition, Hotel Metropole, Monte-Carlo
- 2001 “Art Libanais”, Sursock Museum, Beirut, Lebanon
- 2003 Women by Women, The Institute for Women’s Studies in The Arab World, Lebanese American University. Beirut, Lebanon
- 2003 « Les Créateurs au Musée », Musée National, Beirut, Lebanon
- 2010 Contemparabia 2010, Beirut, Lebanon
- 2010 Convergence: New Art from Lebanon. American University Museum, Katzen Arts Center, Washington D.C.
- 2011 Rebirth. Beirut Exhibition Center, BIEL, Beirut, Lebanon.
- 2012 Start, Beirut Lebanon

=== Selected books ===
- 1982 Libano Text: Fulvio Roiter. Map illustration: Mouna Bassili Sehnaoui. Ed. Magnus Edizioni spa 1982
- 1999 Histoires et Mythes Illustre du Liban D'Antan Text: Nina Jidejian. Illustrations: Mouna Bassili Sehnaoui. Ed. Dar An Nahar 1999
- 2001 Professions & Callings Text: Fifi Abou Dib. Paintings: Mouna Bassili Sehnaoui. Ed. Dar An Nahar 2001
- 2008 The Fifth Day Text: Joseph Tarrab, Concept and Paintings: Mouna Bassili Sehnaoui, Ed. Dar An Nahar 2008
- 2011 Berytus The School of Law, Text: Nina Jidejian. Illustrations: Mouna Bassili Sehnaoui. Ed.Dar An Nahar 2011
