= Yasser Akkaoui =

Lebanese-Swiss activist and publisher

Yasser Akkaoui (born March 22, 1969) is a Lebanese-Swiss corporate governance activist and publisher. He advises companies and regulators in the Middle East on how to embed a culture of accountability and transparency in their corporate culture. Akkaoui has been the publisher of Executive magazine since 2001, a platform he uses to advocate for reforms in the Middle East. He is often invited to speak at international conferences on the topic of corporate governance and his insight has contributed to the publication of reports discussing the development of policies and reforms in the Arab World.

== Civil society ==
Akkaoui is actively involved in civil society in the Middle East. He has been a committee member of Human Rights Watch in the Middle East since 2010. He is a member of the Organisation for Economic Co-operation and Development's taskforce for Middle East and North Africa stock exchanges. He is the regional consultant for the Center for International Private Enterprise (CIPE). In April 2010, he was invited to Washington by US president Barack Obama, along with delegates from around the world invested in advancing entrepreneurship, to discuss the state of entrepreneurship in the Middle East and North Africa.

Since 2011, Akkaoui is the chairman of the Lebanese Center for Policy Studies (LCPS), the most respected think tank in the Middle East. Established in 1989, it operates as an independently managed, politically neutral, think tank initiating many advocacy initiatives for judicial reforms, transparent budget process, decentralization and local governance, and the enhancement of the function of business associations in policy making. In a recent survey of think tanks conducted by the University of Pennsylvania, LCPS was ranked first out of eleven Lebanese think tanks and eighth out of 217 Arab think tanks. (LINK) From 2008 to 2012, he has been a board member of the Lebanese Transparency Association (LTA), Transparency International’s Lebanese chapter and through LTA, he has co-founded the Institute of Directors in 2010 which aims on promoting good governance in Lebanon. As of 2014, Akkaoui is on the steering committee of the Middle East and North Africa Private Equity Association.

Akkaoui founded the Center for Strategic Studies, a non-governmental non-profit organization dedicated to raising awareness on employment issues and developing resources strategies. The association provides guidance to the government on labor economic policies, especially the strong relationship between foreign direct investment and the labor market.

== Corporate Governance Consulting ==
Through Capital Concept, a company he founded in 2005, Akkaoui advises companies and regulators in the Middle East on corporate governance and was instrumental in the generation of a number of codes. He has advised large companies in the Middle East such as Al Qudra Holding, one of the region's largest investment groups. He is often invited to deliver presentations on corporate governance in the Middle East. For instance, in February 2009, in partnership with the Bahrain Accountants Association and the Bahrain Journalists Association, Akkaoui delivered a presentation on corporate governance for family owned businesses in Bahrain; in April 2009, he was part of a delegation invited by CIPE and the Yemeni Businessmen Club to train board of directors in Yemen on corporate governance. In November 2010, Akkaoui was invited to Oman to be part of a conference on the growth of corporate governance in the MENA region.

In 2006, Capital Concept was instrumental in the creation of Hawkama, the Dubai-based institute of corporate governance for the Middle East and helped raise funds for its setup.

== Media ==
As a publisher, Akkaoui has been representing the interests of Executive Magazine since 2001, a media platform he uses to advocate reforms in the Middle East. Executive, established in 1999, is dedicated to providing its readers with in-depth and forward thinking analysis, solid reporting and punchy opinion on Middle Eastern business, economy and public policy. Executive's mission is to cover issues that impact the economic development of the Middle East as well as widespread abuses of human rights, corruption in public and private spheres and disregard for the environment and cultural heritage.

In 2010, Executive Magazine became the first Lebanon-based, pan-Arab member of Business Publications Audit BPA Worldwide, the world's largest media auditing organization.

In May 2013, Akkaoui was elected board member of Lebanon's chapter of the International Advertising Association for a two-year mandate.

In the same month, he was also selected to be Lebanon's representative of the Cannes Lions International Festival of Creativity for the 2013 and 2014 awards.

== Human Resources Consulting ==
Akkaoui also founded PrimeJob, an executive search advisory firm working along with several established Middle Eastern companies through which he promotes the free movement of labor in the region.

== Education ==
Akkaoui teaches an entrepreneurship course at the American University of Beirut (AUB) as well as at the Ecole Superieure des Affaires (ESA). He also teaches strategic management at AUB.

== Art ==
Akkaoui has been a strategic partner for the Beirut Art Fair since its inception in 2010. The Beirut Art Fair, held annually, is an exhibition of contemporary art and design from the Middle East, North Africa and South Asia region featuring 40 galleries in an indoor/outdoor space of 5,000 square meters.
