= Personal status law in Lebanon =

Legal systems in Lebanon that apply based on individual religion

In Lebanon, personal status law refers to the system under which each citizen is governed by specific laws and subject to specific obligations, corresponding to their legally recognized religion. Instead of a common or unified civil personal status law, Lebanon uses 15 legal frameworks and religious courts to represent the 18 officially recognized sects, and the law operates under the premise that every citizen, even an atheist, belongs to one such sect. It affects large aspects of daily life for Lebanese citizens, especially in the realms of marriage and family law, including child custody and (especially for Muslim sects) inheritance.

Criticisms about personal status law in Lebanon range from access to civil marriage to its discrimination against women. Activists have campaigned for a secular Lebanon and the removal of personal status law from the constitution. This arrangement was codified in Article 9 of the Lebanese Constitution and has not changed since 1926.

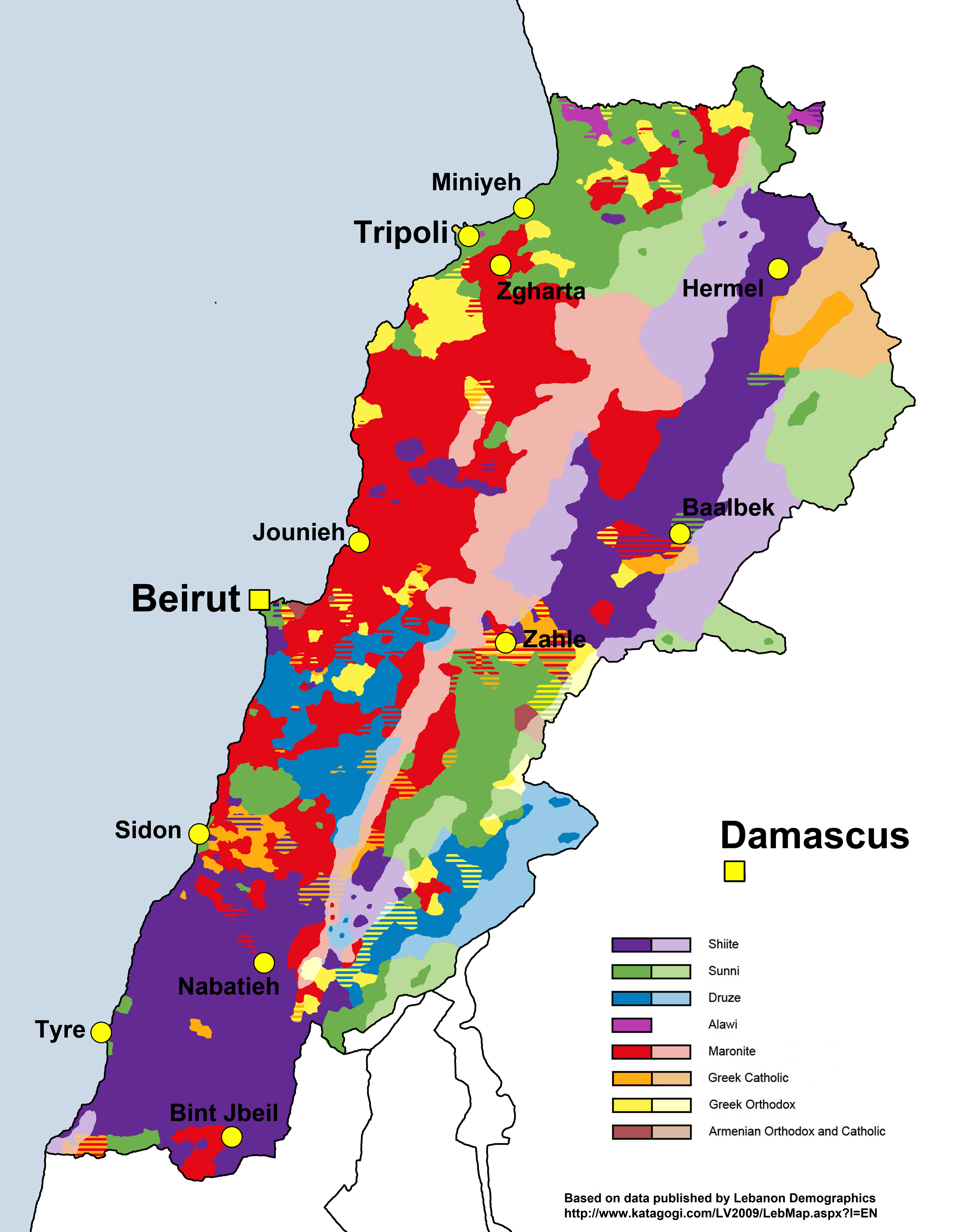
Religious groups in Lebanon

== History ==
=== Tanzimat reforms & sectarianization of Lebanon ===
During the 19th century, the region of Mount Lebanon was nominally ruled by the Ottoman Empire, but was locally administered by several powerful families from Muslim, Druze, and Maronite backgrounds. This arrangement existed under the Millet system, which afforded communities degrees of autonomy on religious matters. The Ottoman Tanzimat reforms, alongside pressure from western powers and local rivalries, upended the delicate balance that had existed, and as a result sectarianism became entrenched in the region: sect became a principle characteristic.

The sectarian conflict of 1860 further solidified the new sectarian reality of Mount Lebanon. Following the conflict, the Règlement Organique split Mount Lebanon into different administrative regions among sectarian lines. This entrenched sectarian boundaries into a legal and political system in Lebanon for the first time. However, only six religious communities were recognized by the Règlement Organique; Maronite, Sunni, Greek Orthodox, Greek Catholic, Druze, and Shi'a.

For the rest of the 19th century, Lebanon operated under a mix of different and competing personal status laws. Ottoman secularization under the Tanzimat reforms ran parallel to the Règlement Organique. For example, secular courts such as the Nizamiye Courts were introduced in 1879, whilst religious courts still held influence over family rights and other personal status areas.

=== 1917 Ottoman Law of Family Rights ===
Whilst not officially part of the Tanzimat reforms, the 1917 Ottoman Law of Family Rights similarly enacted sweeping changes by attempting to create a uniform civil personal status law across the empire, including in Lebanon. This reform was instituted by the Committee of Union and Progress against the backdrop of a faltering Ottoman Empire at the end of WW1, in an aim to simplify and modernize the Ottoman legal system. In Lebanon, this was the first (and last) time that a unified civil personal status law existed. It was short-lived, however, as in 1919 it was repealed as the Ottoman Empire fell. For example, in Turkey, Atatürk implemented a civil personal status law based on the Swiss Code.

=== French Mandate (1920–1943) ===
Flag of Greater Lebanon during the French mandate (1920–1943)

After the creation of Greater Lebanon as a French Mandate in 1920, the Ottoman Law of Family Rights was abandoned and replaced with an earlier sectarian model. As such, the French formalized 18 separate sectarian identities within Lebanon, each with their own court and legal system. This included 12 Christian, 4 Muslim, 1 Druze, and 1 Jewish communities. The 1926 constitution contained two relevant articles for the sectarian Personal Status Law:

Article 7: "All Lebanese shall be equal before the law. They shall equally enjoy civil and political rights and shall equally be bound by public obligations and duties without any distinction."

Article 9: "Freedom of conscience is absolute. In assuming the obligations of glorifying God, the Most High, the State respects all religions and creeds and safeguards the freedom of exercising the religious rites under its protection, without disturbing the public order. It also guarantees the respect of the system of personal status and religious interests of the people, regardless of their different creeds."

These articles created a precedent which promised equal treatment to all citizens whilst protecting communalism at the same time. In 1932, a census was taken to record Lebanon's population, which would end up being the only census of Lebanon's demographics. As such, it remains important and has influenced both the number of sects recognized in Lebanon and the power-sharing agreement enshrined in the constitution. Multiple attempts were made during the Mandate period to reform Lebanon and introduce a civil code for all sects. However, these were all blocked by conservative sectarian powers.

=== Independence and civil war ===
When Lebanon gained its independence in 1943, there were once again calls for reform of personal status laws. However, the National Pact of 1943 entrenched confessionalism and furthered the sectarianization of Lebanon. Furthermore, Articles 7 and 9 of the 1926 Lebanese constitution remained in place, which enshrined the old system of personal status law in the now independent Lebanon.

During the Civil War (1975–1990), whilst most of the state became frozen in conflict, personal status courts seem to have more or less survived, and kept working in their respective communities throughout the war. The Taif agreement saw an end to the conflict; the political system of confessionalism was overhauled and rebalanced. However, personal status law would remain unchanged.

== Modern legal framework ==
Personal status law in Lebanon has remained largely unchanged since its institutionalization in the 1926 constitution. There are 15 different courts which represent the 18 officially recognized sects; the 3 sects without their own courts have the option to use another which is similar in religious jurisdiction. Each sect has confessional courts of first instance and of appeal, but while Islamic courts are convened under the auspices of the state, Christian and Jewish courts are autonomous.

Whilst each individual court acts independently of the other, they must follow the constitution. The Court of Cassation is the highest court in Lebanon, and can act as an arbitrator between courts when there are conflicts. This can happen, for instance, in the case of interfaith marriages, which are not uncommon. Given the lack of a civil law, certain legal options are impossible in Lebanon: for example, it is impossible to legally marry as a Baha'i couple in Lebanon, because the Baha'i faith is not officially recognized. They would have to marry in another country. During the COVID-19 pandemic when the state of Ohio began conducting online civil marriages, several Lebanese couples made use of the service, given that travel abroad to marry was usually reserved to those who could afford it.

In addition, in her study of religious disputes, anthropologist Maya Mikdashi observes that the Plenary Assembly of Lebanon's Court of Cassation places importance on the official registration of conversions. Rather than assessing the sincerity of an individual in terms of their religious beliefs, the court examines whether the required administrative procedures were completed. Failure to register a conversion can therefore affect which religious court has jurisdiction over a personal status dispute.

In addition, the Court of Cassation's Plenary Assembly has treated the refusal to investigate the sincerity of an individual's conversion as a protection of freedom of religion and expression.

Even if the administrative procedures for registering conversions are officially the same for men and women, their legal consequences can differ according to gender. Mikdashi argues that this reflects the interaction between religious affiliation and gender, where changing one's sect can alter the legal framework governing family relationships and individual rights.

Given the differences in legal rulings between the courts, people from disadvantaged backgrounds sometimes change their official sect in order to achieve favourable outcomes. For example, one sect might have looser rules surrounding divorce, meaning a husband or wife might convert in order to legally divorce. The law prevents the strict requirement of proof on conversion, meaning it cannot stop citizens from announcing a change in religion. This has created a system in which sectarianism is practiced fluidly, many changing their legal religious characteristic, rather than a dogmatic focus on their sect.

In Lebanon, personal status is bureaucratically managed through these state census registries and family civil extracts, which provide a serial number to each individual. However, Lebanese citizens are organised through family numbers, following a patriarchal formula. Women are permanently registered under a male figure, be it their father or, if married, their husband. Consequently, women cannot legally be inscribed as heads of household, restricting their exercise of power as legal guardians for children, who are also registered under their father's family number. Therefore, they automatically inherit their father's sect and municipality.

== Key issues and debates ==
=== Civil marriage ===
Whilst civil marriage is not possible in Lebanon, in 2013 one couple managed to argue they had the right to one after removing their religious affiliations from civil records. This put them in a legal greyzone wherein their right to marriage outweighed them being 'outside' the personal status law. The Court of Cassation eventually recognized their civil marriage, unaffiliated with the personal status courts. However, many who wish for a civil marriage in Lebanon still do not take this path given the legal complications and difficulties of being religiously unaffiliated.

=== Gender equality ===
Critics of Lebanon's Personal Status Laws argue that the lack of a civil law enables discrimination based on gender, which runs contrary to Article 7 in the constitution, which states that "All Lebanese shall be equal in front of the law". This is seen in areas such as the weight of testimonials, inheritance, and divorce. Given the centrality of sect, and the ensuing centrality of gender and sex to sect, gender differences and inequality become a major factor of day-to-day life.

Personal status law in Lebanon is heavily tied to nationality laws. Women are not legally entitled to pass their Lebanese citizenship to their husbands or to their children, this right being reserved strictly to men. This frequently leads to children requiring residency visas and facing foreign tuition fees for public education, as well as encountering work restrictions.

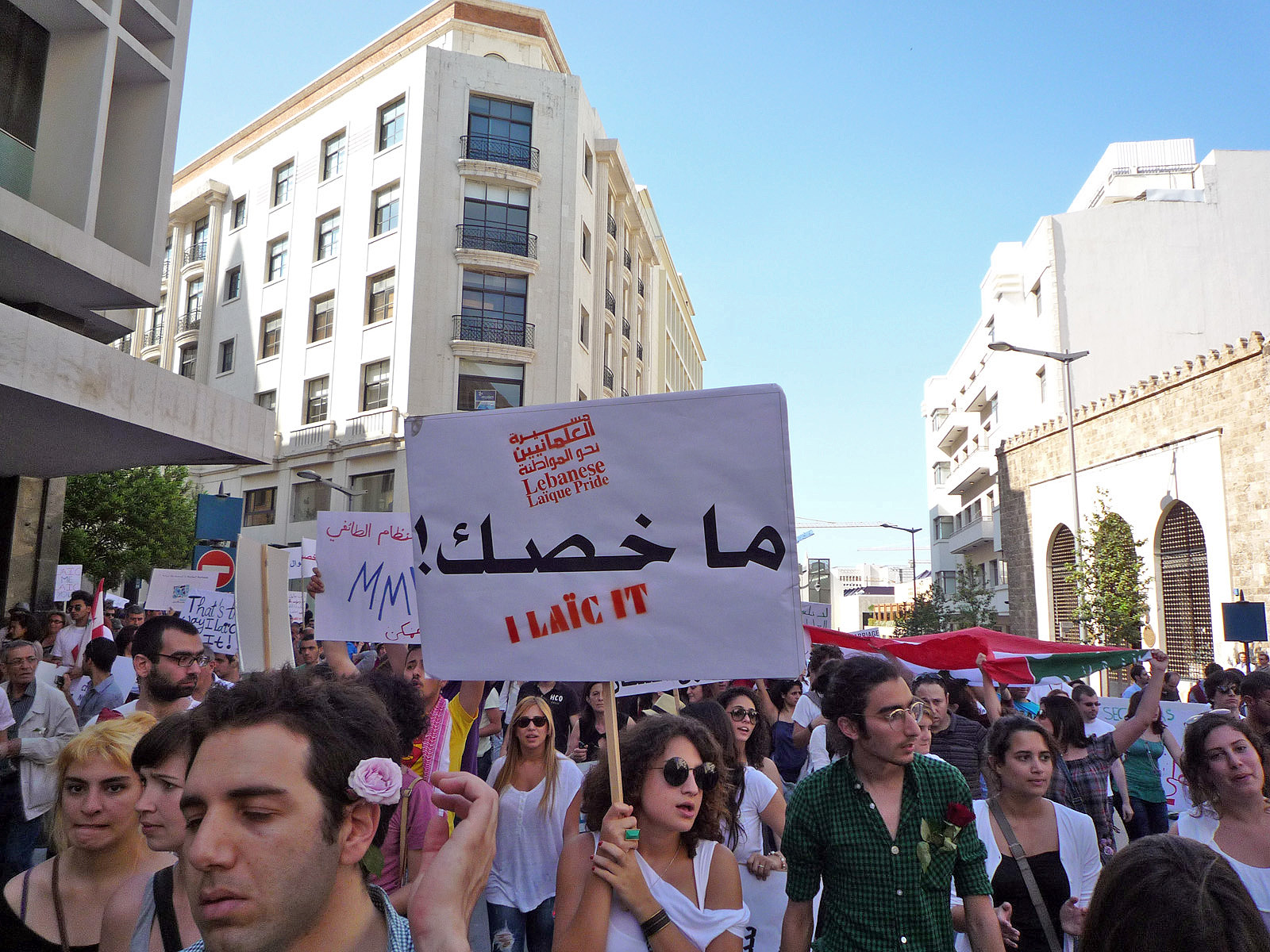
"Laïque Pride" rally in Beirut in 2010

=== Secularism ===
Secularism stands as an 'opposite' to the sectarian Personal Status Law, and there have been many in Lebanon who wish to see a civil, or secular, law which does away with the confessional system. Academic Maya Mikdashi has argued that this has evolved into a form of Evangelical Secularism, where people should culturally 'act secular' - and in doing so move away from the current personal status law. However, others argue that a turn to secularism would not solve the issues inherent in the current system, given that the state would still remain in control, and continue existing discriminatory practices under different names.

Laïque Pride began in 2010 as a popular movement to end sectarianism and introduce a Civil code. Those attending wished to focus on the individuality of Lebanese citizens, and thus end the pigeon-holing which personal status law relies on.

== Reform efforts ==
There have been several efforts to reform Lebanon's personal status laws, although all have failed as of 2026.

Following independence in 1943, several lawmakers attempted to pass a civil marriage bill to reform the Personal Status Law. In 1952 and again in 1962 the Lebanese parliament debated civil tribunes for a civil personal status law. In 1973 the New Unified Personal Status Law Proposal was presented to the Lebanese Parliament by Abdallāh Lahhūd of the Democratic Party. All three of these would be defeated by religious groups unified in their opposition, who enjoyed positions of power due to the sectarian nature of the Personal Status Law.

In 1998, then President of Lebanon Elias Hrawi proposed an optional civil marriage law following the Taif Agreement. This would be considered one of the most serious reform attempts because it came from inside the government. However, whilst 22 ministers agreed to sign, Prime Minister Rafiq Hariri refused to sign it. This meant that whilst it passed the cabinet, it was eventually withdrawn and not implemented.

In 2011, the Chaml organization, a secular NGO introduced a draft law on civil marriage to the Lebanese parliament. However, it was immediately struck down, which means it was never debated. One of the latest reform effort happened in 2022, when a white paper was presented by the Adyan Foundation. This was created through interfaith discussions within Lebanon, and promoted changing the personal status law from within, whilst creating an avenue for optional civil marriage. However, it again was not debated in parliament and has thus not been implemented to date.

== See also ==
- Confessionalism
- Lebanese Constitution
- Freedom of religion in Lebanon
- Taif Agreement
