= Irreligion in Lebanon =

Irreligion is very uncommon in Lebanon, as Islam and Christianity are the predominant faiths. It is difficult to quantify the number of atheists or agnostics in Lebanon as they are not officially counted in the census of the country. The Lebanese Constitution guarantees the freedom of belief. There is a great stigma attached to being an atheist in Lebanon, thus many Lebanese atheists communicate via the internet. It is difficult not to have your religion stated at birth, although a baby made history in doing so in 2014.

Lebanon's last official population census – taken in 1932 during the French Mandate of Greater Lebanon – states that 0% of the Lebanese population is atheist. Consequently, none of the government's parliamentary seats are reserved for that share of the electorate.

Most modern estimates still do not include any atheist communities or districts in Lebanon.

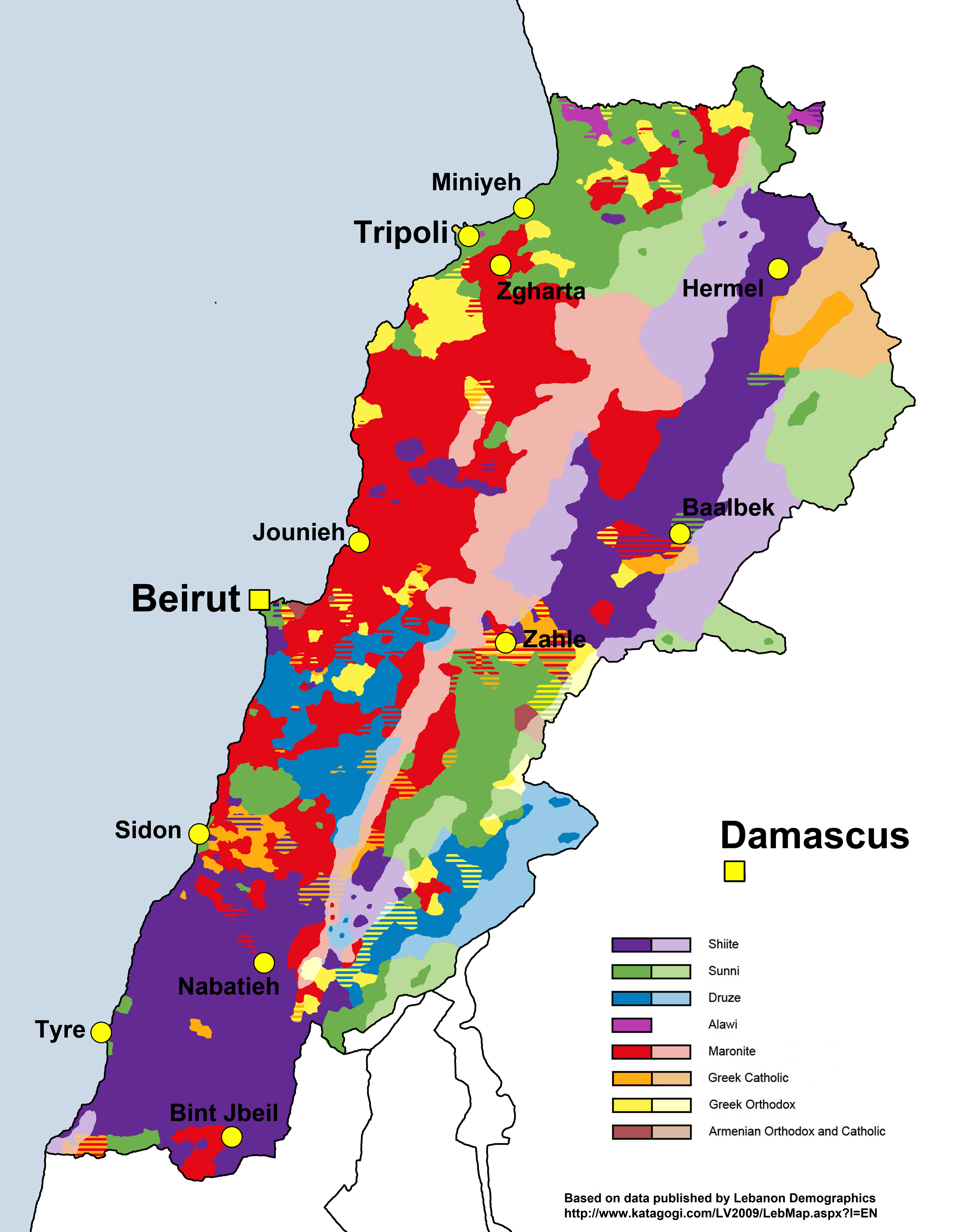
Lebanon religious groups distribution

Atheists may not marry in Lebanon as marriage must be performed according to either Muslim or Christian religious rites. Publicly blaspheming God is punishable with a minimum of one month up to one year of prison time according to article 473 of the Penal Code of Lebanon. The exact wording of the clause is that "blaspheming God publicly" is illegal. In addition, disrespecting Christianity or Islam is punishable by a minimum of three years to a maximum of six years of jail time according to article 474 of the Penal Code.

Life in Lebanon is largely divided along sectarian lines. Schools, housing, and political parties are generally segregated along religious lines. For example, East Beirut and West Beirut are almost exclusively Christian and Muslim, respectively. Muslims and Christians have different civil codes, meaning that the punishment for a crime and other civil procedure (like divorce) may be different for a Christian than a Muslim.

== Irreligion in the Lebanese Government ==
The Lebanese government is structured around the unofficial National Pact. It is a multiconfessionalist government, meaning parliamentary seats are reserved for certain religious groups. The Pact used data from the 1932 census, which counted 0 atheists in Lebanon. Among other things, it stipulated that:

- The President is always a Maronite Catholic.
- The Prime Minister is always a Sunni Muslim.
- The Speaker of the House of Deputies is always a Shiite.
- The Parliament is always structured in a ratio of 6:5 in favour of Christians.

The 4th point of the Agreement was changed by the Taif Agreement (1989), and the parliament's new structure gave Muslims and Christians equal representation. Although the new agreement used more recent data, it still gave no reserved seats for atheists in any governmental post. While the confessionalist nature of the government was supposed to be temporary, it was expanded by future constitutional amendments and is still in full force today.

== Student organisations ==
In recent years, there has been some calls by student groups for Lebanese society to become more secular. One such group, "Laique Pride" (after the French concept of laicité) advocates for an end to the confessional government in favour of a secular one. In 2011, they held a rally in Beirut on 27 February.

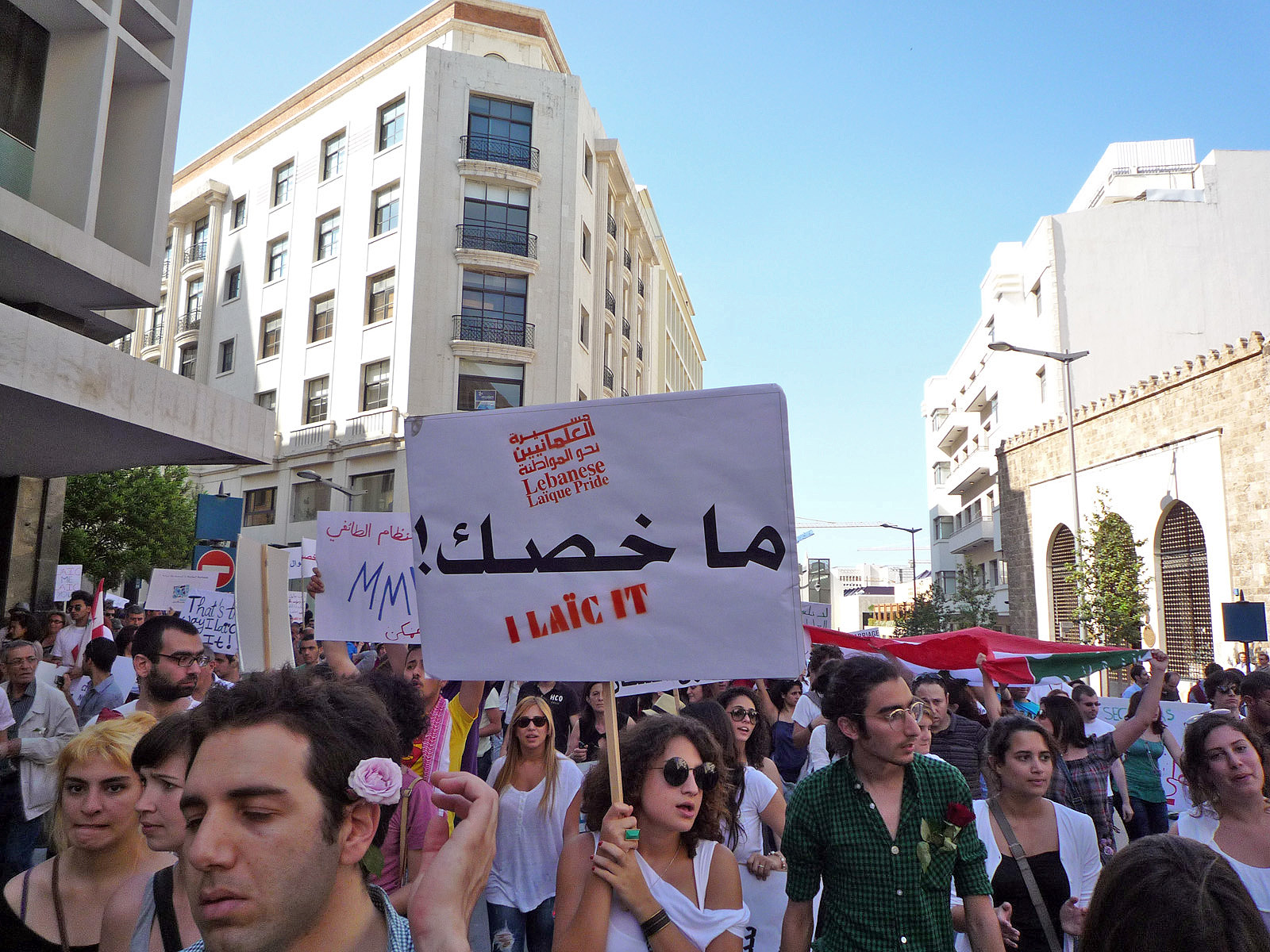
Beirut protest

The university with the most student activists for secularism in the government is the American University of Beirut (AUB). One of the organisations there is the Secular Club, which was set up after the 2008 conflict. Its goal, according to former president Joumana Talhouk, is "to create a political space where people from different social and sectarian backgrounds can unite under common principles." Another example of student activism is the far-left Red Oak Club. According to former president Theresa Sahyoun, the Red Oak Club and the Secular Club managed to find "common ground" and endorse the August 2016 Martyrs' Square protest organized by Laïque Pride.

== Opposition to irreligion ==
The overwhelming majority of Lebanese people are against the removal of religion in the public/private sphere. Both Christians and Muslims generally prefer to keep the Lebanese government divided along sectarian lines to increase their influence.

Following Ghadi Darwish being the first child born in Lebanon without a designated sect, the Sunni Grand Mufti of Lebanon issued a fatwa condemning civil marriage and calling the idea a "germ" in Lebanese society.

== List of notable non-religious Lebanese ==
- Husayn Muruwwa
- As'ad AbuKhalil
- Rania Khalek
- Gad Saad
- George Hawi
- Ziad Rahbani
- Joumana Haddad
- Rabih Alameddine
- Mia Khalifa

== See also ==
- Religion in Lebanon
- Secularism in Lebanon
- Freedom of religion in Lebanon
- Christianity in Lebanon
- Islam in Lebanon
- Demographics of Lebanon
