= Laïque Pride =

Lebanese secularist protest movement

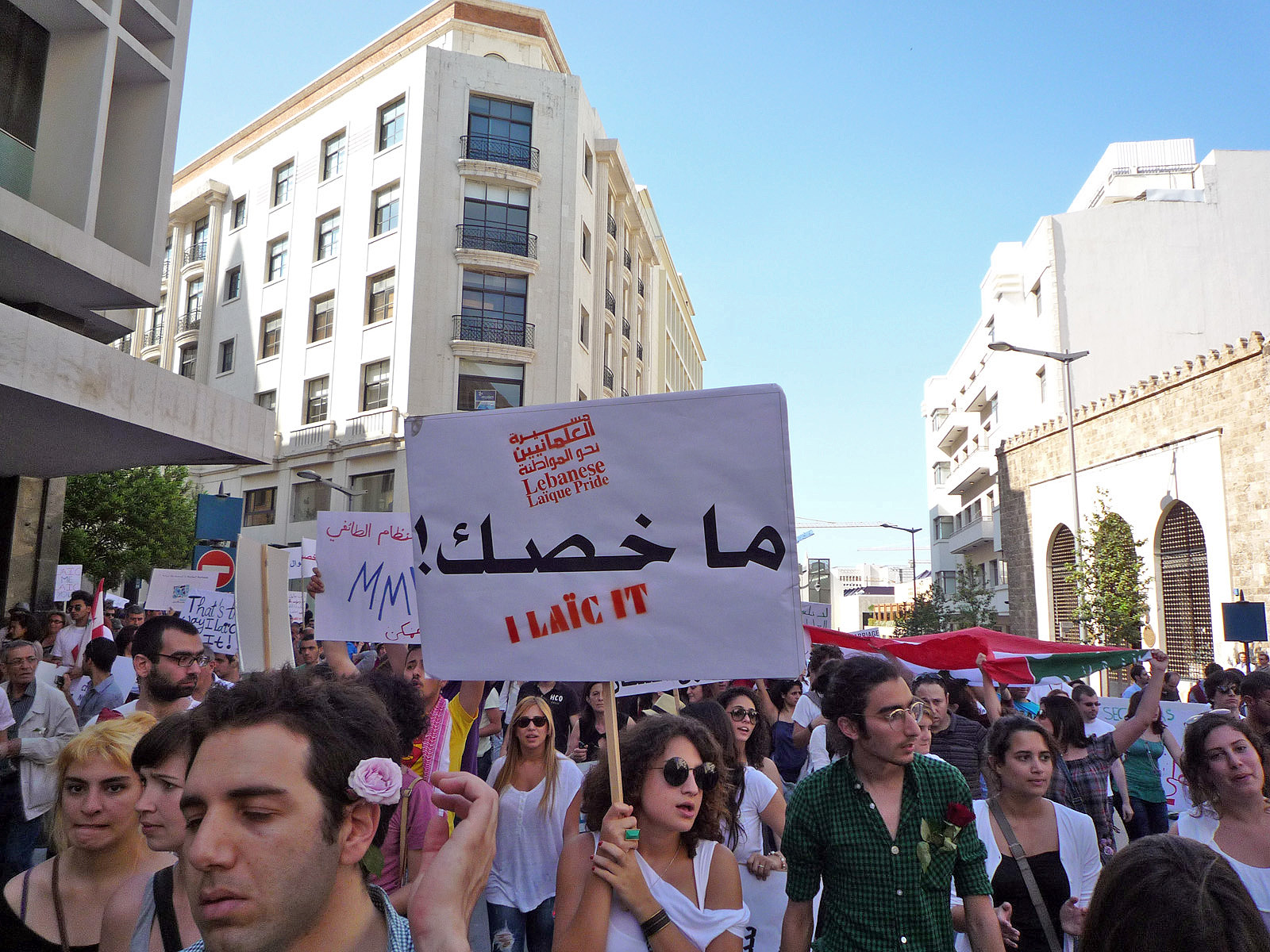
"The Laique Pride" rally in Beirut Central District, Lebanon, 2010

Lebanese Laïque Pride, also Laïque Pride, Laic Pride, or Secular Pride, is a Lebanese secularist protest movement. The movement consists of various religious and social groups that are united in their call for secularism, women's rights, and media freedom in Lebanon. They advocate for "equality among all Lebanese citizens and the separation of religion and politics." The group is opposed to political sectarianism and confessionalism in Lebanon.

Laïque pride began in the winter of 2009 as a Facebook conversation between five friends, split between Paris and Beirut, who were concerned about the rising censorship of arts in Lebanon. The first march took place in 2010 and marches continued until 2013. Within a matter of months, the group organized peaceful marches against sectarianism in Lebanon and in favor of "secular Lebanon." These marches mobilized participants around issues of personal status and citizenship and reflected what Maya Mikdashi describes as “evangelical secularism,” a movement that promotes secularism while drawing on Islamic practices and the "global, missionary character of state modernity".The event serves as a platform for activists to advocate for the importance of secularism, equality, and freedom of religion in Lebanon, to ensure wider tolerance across the country.

In April 2010, more than 5,000 people participated in a Laïque Pride rally, calling for "an end to the country's deep-rooted sectarian system" and for a "secular Lebanon." The march covered roughly 1km, from the Beirut seafront to the Parliament, and participants carried identity documents with the religious affliation replaced by '/' and civil marriage certificates issued abroad, as well as signs sich as 'What is my sect? None of your business!' and 'I want to be President of the Republic. Should I convert to Christianity?'. The rally was inspired by the San Francisco gay pride marches of the 1970s, which were all about the announcement of presence and demanding rights. In the Lebanese case, their pride was about declaring the presence of and telling everyone about the existence of secular people in Lebanon whose needs were not being met. Initial demands of the movement include the enactment of a civil marriage law independent of any religious sects. Within the organization of the march, according to Maya Mikdashi, tensions regarding the inclusion of LGBTQ rights in the rally had arisen due to a split within the leadership regarding possibly alienating major parts of Lebanese society in the promotion of secularism in Lebanon, due to a perceived "larger trend of homophobia" in Lebanon. Mikdashi notes that while a majority of the organizers were queer, some groups in the coalition sought to keep the march from being associated with LGBTQ rights and organizers banned both rainbow flags and Hizbollah flags. Some LGBTQ activists felt betrayed and brought rainbow flags anyway, which became the most photographed signs in international press coverage.

In May 2012, the movement issued demands, of which four were concerning women's rights and two were concerning media freedom. Laïque Pride also supports the enacting of a unified Civil Code for the Personal Status Law.

== See also ==
- Secularist movement in Lebanon
- Sectarianism in Lebanon
