= Sectarianism in Lebanon =

Sectarianism in Lebanon refers to the formal and informal organization of Lebanese politics and society along religious lines. It has been formalized and legalized within state and non-state institutions and is inscribed in its constitution. Lebanon recognizes 18 different sects: 55% of the population is Muslim (27% Sunni, 27% Shia, small percentage of Alawites and Ismailis), 40.5% is Christian, the majority being Maronites Catholics and Greek Orthodox (with smaller groups including Greek Catholics, Armenian Orthodox, Armenian Catholics, Syriac Orthodox, Syriac Catholics, Assyrians, Chaldean Catholics, Copts, Protestants), while 4.52% is Druze. The foundations of sectarianism in Lebanon dates back to the mid-19th century during Ottoman rule. It was subsequently reinforced with the creation of the Republic of Lebanon in 1920, during the French Mandate era and the 1926 constitution, and in the National Pact of 1943. In 1990, with the Taif Agreement, the constitution was revised but did not structurally change aspects relating to political sectarianism. The dynamic nature of sectarianism in Lebanon has prompted some historians and authors to refer to it as "the sectarian state par excellence" because it is a mixture of religious communities and their myriad sub-divisions, with a constitutional and political order to match.

Despite the religious nature of sectarian affiliations, sectarianism in Lebanon is commonly considered to be a political project, as it not only relies on, but also reproduces, complex and unstable relations between religious and sectarian affiliation, on the one hand, and politics, violence, conflict, and co-existence, on the other. Sectarianism can therefore in Lebanon best be seen as a religious division that dictates: how people treat each other in daily life, determines their personal legal status and how the political parties are divided. Through the sectarian discourse, religion becomes the defining characteristic of the public and political subject, following a logic that has been established by (religious) authorities.

Some scholars and journalists define sectarianism as fixed pre-existing communal categories in society, and use it to explain political, cultural, or religious conflicts between groups. Other scholars conceive of sectarianism as a set of social practices where daily life is organised on the basis of communal norms and rules that individuals strategically use and transcend. Historian Maya Mikdashi conceives of sectarianism as, first and foremost, a biopolitical, governmental process that often has little to do with individual faith. Because sect is a governmental status inherited patrilinially, it is possible to, for example, be an atheist by faith while being a Muslim by law.

Recent scholarship also highlights the transnational dimensions of sectarianism, noting how sectarian narratives and political interpretations circulate through diaspora networks, media, and migration between Lebanon and communities abroad.

== History ==
=== 19th century ===
Historians have argued that the origins of sectarianism lay at the "intersection of nineteenth-century European colonialism and Ottoman modernization." The traditional order of Lebanese society during Ottoman domination was not primarily organized along sectarian lines. Ottoman Lebanese society could be described as divided between an elite community that controlled religious and secular knowledge and common villagers that constituted the bulk of the society. Elite membership was thus determined by rank rather than religious affiliation, and relied on familial power constructed through a network of family alliances that often cut across religious lines. However, between 1840 and 1860, this social order began to be questioned and transformed, and religion entered the political sphere. The end of Ibrahim Pasha's occupation in 1840 created a power vacuum that various actors tried to exploit. Some of these actors relied on a religious base for their claims: the Maronite Church, for instance, called for the restoration of a Christian emirate in the region, while Maronite peasants asked for equality in the name of the Edict of Gulhane which in 1839 had guaranteed the rights of Ottoman citizens regardless of their religion. Moreover, the establishment of a new order in Mount Lebanon became the arena for the clash between European and Ottoman interests. While the Ottoman Empire attempted centralization through the Tanzimat reforms, European powers favoured local autonomies on religious bases. This European practice altered the meaning of religion in the multi-confessional society because it "emphasized sectarian identity as the only viable marker of political reform and the only authentic basis for political claims."

=== French mandate ===
In the decades that followed, a colonial strategy and technique to assert control and perpetuate power used by the French during their mandate rule of Lebanon was divide and rule, and during this era sectarianism was institutionalized through the codification of personal status laws. The establishment of the Ja'fari court in 1926, facilitated by the French as a "quasi-colonial institution", provided Shi'a Muslims with sectarian rights through the institutionalization of Shi’a Islam, and hence gave rise to political Shi’ism. The "variation in the institutionalization of social welfare across different sectarian communities forged and exacerbated social disparities". Additionally, with the standardization, codification and bureaucratization of Shi’a Islam, a Shi’i collective identity began to form and the Shi’i community started to "practice" sectarianism. "The French colonial state contributed to rendering the Shi‘i community in Jabal ‘Amil and Beirut more visible, more empowered, but also more sectarian, in ways that it had never quite been before." This fundamental transformation led by the French created a new political reality that paved the way for the "mobilization" and "radicalization" of the Shi’a community during the Lebanese civil war.

Subsequently, the formation of the modern Lebanese nation-state in 1920 and its official independence in 1943 was founded on politicized sectarianism as the only form of governance and presumed egalitarianism between individual citizens and recognized sectarian groups." Hence, "in many ways sectarian identification converged with personal status, or madhhab, whereby the state recognized one official personal status per sect." Eighteen sects are officially recognized today, but only fifteen madhhabs. Regarding the Shi’i sect, this group was not officially recognized under the Ottoman Empire, while "the expansion of sectarian rights under the French mandate laid the foundation for Shi’i citizens in the postcolonial state, which entailed the formation of Ja’fari shari’a courts."

Meanwhile, when it came to the school system during the French mandate Lebanon's sectarianism was further allowed to establish itself. In 1920 the French founded the "Service de l’instruction publique" (SIP) whose task it was to oversee the education system in the French mandates. This French government body allowed different religious groups in Lebanon to establish their own religious schools with their own curriculum. Although the SIP did take control over the curriculum of the public schools in Lebanon. The non-religious private schools however would also be granted the right to establish their own curriculum in 1924, however this did come with the clause that a limited amount of French had to be taught in the school. Although the different religious groups were able to establish their own schools, students did not necessarily select a school solely based on their sectarian affiliation. While sect affiliation was one factor in school choice, other considerations—such as social class, political ideology, cultural alignment, and geographical proximity—also played a significant role. Consequently, although community affiliations influenced educational structures, the boundaries within the education system were often more fluid than those within the state apparatus.

However, so far, the main emphasis of the majority of research has been on the top-down sectarianism, whereby policies and institutionalization have formed the main aspect of research. What is often forgotten is the bottom-up approach towards sectarianism. Scholars like Linda Sayed and Nadya Sbaiti have studied sectarianism from this often neglected approach and have come to the conclusion that citizens themselves have had a more flexible understanding of this segregation of groups in their society. After all, sectarianism became institutionalised in Lebanon only upon it becoming a French mandate. Its population was thus used to the non-sectarian institutions of the late Ottoman Empire and had yet to be accustomed to the newly established sectarian institutions. For instance, Linda Sayed shows that Shi’i citizens used the court-system, created by the French rulers, in a rather pragmatic way than in a rigid sectarian sense and Nadya Sbaiti shows that people used the school-system in the same pragmatic fashion, creating communities of knowledge. In other words, people’s choices regarding the education of their children was rather based on guaranteeing at least a basic education "in the hope of some incremental if not dramatic betterment. Their decisions often centered around this goal and evinced less concern with the allegedly ‘unique’ confessional-communal characteristics reflected by a given school."

=== National Pact (1943) ===
Lebanon gained independence on 22 November 1943. Shortly thereafter, the National Pact was agreed upon and established the political foundations of modern Lebanon and laid the foundations of a sectarian power-sharing system (also known as confessionalism) based on the 1932 census. The 1932 census is the only official census conducted in Lebanon: with a total population of 1,046,164 persons, Maronites made up 33.57%, Sunnis made up 18.57% and Shiites made up 15.92% (with several other denominations making up the remainder). The National Pact served to reinforce the sectarian system that had begun under the French Mandate, by formalizing the confessional distribution of the highest public offices and top administrative ranks according to the proportional distribution of the dominant sects within the population. Because the census showed a slight Christian dominance over Muslims, seats in the Chamber of Deputies (parliament) were distributed by a six-to-five ratio favoring Christians over Muslims. This ratio was to be applied to all highest-level public and administrative offices, such as ministers and directors. Furthermore, it was agreed that the President of the Republic would be a Maronite Christian; the Premier of the Council of Ministers would be a Sunni Muslim; the President of the National Assembly would be a Shiite Muslim; and the Deputy Speaker of Parliament a Greek Orthodox Christian. The referencing of Lebanon's census during every election year was supposed to determine the positions allotted to each religious sect, and yet this has not been done since 1932. Updating the census would result in an alteration of the power balance, thus changing the relative strength of ethnic communities - possibly in favour of Muslim communities, given the higher growth rate that has been observed within them.

=== Lebanese Civil War (1975-1990) ===
During the three decades following independence from the French Mandate, the sectarian system established with the National Pact and developments in the region brought about escalating tensions that culminated with a civil strife that lasted from 1975 until 1990. During this conflict, sectarianism reached its peak: militia politics gripped Lebanon, representing another form of popular mobilization along sectarian lines against the elite-dominated Lebanese state. The beginning of the war dates to 13 April 1975, when a Maronite militia opened fire on a bus full of civilians in response to an assassination attempt of a Maronite leader, allegedly by Muslims affiliated with the Palestine Liberation Organization (PLO).

In the years leading up to the civil war, Christians had already begun setting up armed militias against what they "saw as an attempt by the PLO to seize Lebanon" due to the presence of the organization in the South of the country. These militias merged in 1976 under the umbrella of the Lebanese Forces, which became the armed group of the Lebanese Front's coalition - the Maronite alliance dominated by Kataeb Party (also known as Phalanges). In the first months of the conflict, the Lebanese Front main rival was the alliance between the Lebanese National Movement (LNM) - a coalition of nationalist and progressive Druze and Sunni movements - and the PLO. The PLO constituted the main military force of the LNM, but the alliance counted also smaller militias and, from January 1976, the Muslim splinter faction of the Lebanese army, the Lebanese Arab Army. In this first phase of the conflict, the Shiite front led by Imam Musa al-Sadr tried to maintain a neutral position, even though a military group, Amal, was formed. The rapid militarization of the fronts accompanied an escalation of violence that led in January 1976 to the massacres of Karantina (by Lebanese Forces) and Damour (by PLO and LNM forces). The first months of violence were accompanied by an intense political debate between the Lebanese Front and the LNM, especially in the context of the Committee for National Dialogue that tried to reinforce a first ceasefire during September and October 1975. The CND focused its debate around the possibility to reform the Lebanese political system from a sectarian to a secular one. Despite the Committee approving this reform, an alliance of Maronite leaders sabotaged it, blocking the way to any reform.

Syria entered the conflict in June 1976, in order to avoid a PLO takeover of Lebanon – Syria's entry into the war resulted in a de facto division of the country into zones controlled by Syria, the PLO, and Maronite militias. Initially Syrian intervention backed the Lebanese Front and was supported by Amal. At the same time, Israel opened its frontier with Southern Lebanon, co-opting dissident Christian units within Lebanese Army to put pressure in the southern regions. In March 1978 these units took control of the region, supported by Israel with the Operation Litani. Given the fact that the Shiite community was based in the South of the country, the Christian presence caused a reaction and reinforcement from Amal - with Syrian support. With Imam Musa al-Sadr's disappearance in August 1978, Amal moved further in supporting Lebanese Shiite cause, distancing itself from all fronts involved in the conflict.

The Lebanese Civil War officially became a regional dilemma when Israel invaded in 1982 with two avowed aims: destroy the PLO military infrastructure and secure its northern frontier through the establishment of a Christian Lebanon. Israel's invasion did indeed lead to PLO retreat from the country and the election of Bachir Gemayel, Maronite leader and commander of the Lebanese Forces, as President of Lebanon. On 14 September 1982, less than a month after his election, Gemayel was killed during an attack on his party headquarters. The death of their commander led to a retaliation against Palestinians by the Lebanese Forces, with a three-days long massacre in the camps of Sabra and Chatila in West Beirut. Amin Gemayel was elected president at the end of the month to replace his brother Bachir, thus bringing Kataeb party in control of the state. This situation, added to Israeli presence and conflicting approaches on how to resist it, brought to the fragmentation of Lebanon territory, divided in a multitude of "mini-states, run by militias who claimed to be defending their region/sect against the expansionism of the Phalangist state".

While Christians were in control of the state, Muslim militias landscape was more fragmented than ever. In the post-1983 context, the Sunni community experienced political marginalization due to PLO withdrawal, the disappearance of its major leaders, LNM dissolution, and political disappearance of Murabitun, its most important militia. The Shi'a community, on the other hand, was more active but more and more fragmented: the main contraposition was between a "legalist" faction that supported a political solution to the conflict, and a "radical" front that supported the continuation of the war. This latter front was mainly represented by the newborn Hezbollah, whose purpose was the establishment of an Islamic Republic in Lebanon and who soon remained the sole anti-Israeli resistance in the country after Israel withdraw in 1985. Amal kept an intermediate position between these two factions, but engaged in fighting Palestinian presence in the country during the so-called "War of the Camps", in tacit agreement with Israel. Finally, the Druze community under the leadership of Walid Jumblatt engaged in a revenge against 19th-century Maronite expansionism in order to restore the lost glory of Druze feudal status. The socio-sectarian model proposed by Jumblatt merged sectarian and class fractures, and found its main opposition in the Shiite Amal anti-feudalism. The result of this fragmentation was that between 1985 and 1990 each militia started taking control over parts of territory and population, initiating a sectarian and political cleansing within them. This also meant a growing "pressure on the individual to define him/herself in terms of a unique social and cultural sectarian identity".

In March 1989, Prime Minister (and Acting President) General Michel Aoun, with the backing of the PLO and Iraqi president Saddam Hussein, launched a "liberation war" against the Syrian army, which was still controlling part of the country. In doing so, General Aoun internationalized the Lebanese crisis by emphasizing "the destructive role of the Syrian army in the country". His decision resulted in multilateral negotiations as well as efforts to strengthen the role of the UN. By 1989, what had begun as an internal war between Lebanese factions had become a regional conflict that directly drew in Syria, Israel, Iran, Europe and the United States - with Iraq, Libya, Saudi Arabia, and the Soviet Union involved indirectly by providing financial support and weaponry to different militias.

After fifteen years of war, at least 71,328 were killed and 97,184 injured. Moreover, sectarian cleansing led to about 157,500 displaced Muslims and 670,000 Christians. To this it should be added the expulsion and displacement of Palestinians, perceived as "a people too many". Finally, the war led to the emigration of 894,717 people from Lebanon, with serious consequences for the country's economy.

Moreover, during the civil war, motives for violent acts were questioned due to its sectarian character. Such an event was the 1985-shelling of the Cassation Court, which lead to set the archive on fire. It is speculated that the archive held personal sensitive information that was of political importance for an individual in the sectarian system.

=== Taif Agreement (1989) ===
After twenty-two days of discussions and negotiations, the surviving members of the 1972 parliament reached an agreement to end the Civil War on 22 October 1989. The Taif Agreement reconfigured the political power-sharing formula that formed that basis of government in Lebanon under the National Pact of 1943. As noted by Eugene Rogan, "the terms of Lebanon's political re-construction, enshrined in the Taif [Agreement], preserved many of the elements of the confessional system set up in the National Pact but modified the structure to reflect the demographic realities of modern Lebanon." As such, several key provisions of the National Pact were changed: it relocated most presidential powers in favor of Parliament and the Council of Ministers and, as such, the Maronite Christian President lost most of his executive powers and only retained symbolic roles; it redistributed important public offices, including those of Parliament, Council of Ministers, general directors, and grade-one posts, evenly between Muslims and Christians thereby upsetting the traditional ratio of six to five that favored Christians under the National Pact; it "recognized the chronic instability of confessionalism and called for devising a national strategy for its political demise. It required the formation of a national committee to examine ways to achieve deconfessionalization and the formation of a non-confessional Parliament," which has not yet been implemented to date and it required the disarmament of all Lebanese militias; however, Hezbollah was allowed to retain its militant wing as a "resistance force" in recognition of its fight against Israel in the South.

== Political system ==
The Lebanese political system is republican, democratic, parliamentary, liberal and confessional. Its republican nature was established in 1926 with the creation of Lebanon, and is guaranteed within the Constitution. The Constitution also established its liberal, democratic, and representative nature. In regards to the latter, Lebanon adopted a unicameralist parliamentary system, but for a long time the power balance between the Chamber of Deputies and the President actually favoured the latter. Power balance was adjusted with Taif Agreement and the subsequent Constitutional Amendment of 1990. Unlike the aspects just mentioned, confessionalism is not established within the Constitution: in fact, the Constitutional Amendment of 1990 provided for the overcoming of confessionalism in several steps. However, these steps have never been taken and the only provision of the Amendment currently applied is section (3) of Article 95, which guarantees political rights to the confessions. The confessional nature of the Lebanese political system is translated into three main aspects:

- the key government positions are customarily assigned as follows: the president must be a Maronite Christian, the prime minister a Sunni Muslim, and the speaker of parliament a Shiite Muslim.
- the distribution of parliamentary seats is done on a confessional basis.
- grade one posts in public offices are distributed following a confessional representation logic.

As a consequence, "ruling political parties are defined more by religious affiliations than economic or social policy". This, however, does not prevent the forming of alliances, either formal or informal, across religious divides. Both the March 8 Alliance and the March 14 Alliance are coalitions that comprehend Christian and Muslim parties. March 8 includes Hezbollah (Shia Muslim) and the Free Patriotic Movement (Christian), while March 14 includes Future Movement (Sunni Muslim) and both the Lebanese Forces and the Kataeb party (Maronite Christian). The opposition between these two alliances lies mainly in their respectively pro-Syrian and anti-Syrian agenda.

Lebanese political system is dominated by elites, including "traditional leaders, military veterans, former militia leaders, and wealthy businessmen". A consequence of this is the apparently lack of opposition. As Freedom House reports, "consolidation of power among political elites also hampers intraparty competition" and government decisions are "the result of negotiation among the country’s dominant political figures, regardless of formal titles and positions; meanwhile, the legislature generally facilitates these policies rather than serving as an independent institutional check on the government".

=== Major sectarian parties by demographic ===
==== Christian ====
Party		Leader	Alliance	Sect	Notes
Lebanese Forces القوات اللبنانية al-Quwwāt al-Lubnānīyah	LF	Samir Geagea	March 14	Christian	The Lebanese Forces is a Christian-based political party and former militia during the Lebanese Civil War. It currently holds 19 of the 128 seats in Lebanon's parliament and is therefore the largest party in parliament. It was a major Christian player during the civil war while it controlled its own Maronite canton (Marounistan) north of the country.
Free Patriotic Movement التيار الوطني الحرّ at-Tayyār al-Waṭanī al-Horr	FPM	Gebran Bassil	March 8	Christian	The Free Patriotic Movement is Christian-based political party which follows the agenda of former president Michel Aoun. It currently holds 17 seats of the 128 seats in Lebanon's parliament. The party has large support in Christian districts like Batroun and Jezzine.
Kataeb Party (Phalanges) حزب الكتائب اللبنانية Ḥizb al-Katā'ib al-Lubnānīya	Kataeb	Samy Gemayel	March 14	Mainly Maronite	The Phalange Party is a Christian-based political party of Maronite majority and former militia. it currently holds 4 of the 128 seats in parliament, all of which are Maronite Christian. As a militia, it played a pivotal role during the Lebanese Civil War as it controlled its own Maronite canton (Marounistan) as part of the Lebanese Front. The party is also led by the Gemayel family, a notable Maronite family based in the regions of Achrafieh and Metn which carries the legacy of Pierre and Bashir Gemayel.
Armenian Revolutionary Federation Հայ Յեղափոխական Դաշնակցութիւն Hay Heghapokhagan Tashnagtsutiun	ARF ՀՅԴ	Hagop Pakradounian	March 8	Mainly Armenian	The Armenian Revolutionary Federation (or Tashnag for short) is Christian-based political party which primarily represents Lebanon's Armenian population. It currently holds 3 seats of the 128 seats in Lebanon's parliament, all of which are of Armenian Orthodox faith.
Marada Movement تيار المردة Tayyār al-Marada	MM	Suleiman Frangieh	March 8	Mainly Maronite	The Marada Movement is a former militia active during the Lebanese Civil War named after the legendary Marada (also called Mardaites) warriors of the early Middle Ages that fought on the external edge of the Byzantine Empire. The party holds 2 of the 128 seats in parliament and is popular in the districts of Zgharta and Koura. The party was founded and led by the Frangieh family who also claim descendance from the Maradites.

==== Muslim ====
Party		Leader	Alliance	Primary demographic	Notes
Amal Movement حركة أمل Ḥarakat Amal	Amal أمل	Nabih Berri	March 8	Mainly Shiite	The Amal Movement is a political party and former militia mostly affiliated with the Shia community. The party gained attention from Shia outcry after the disappearance of Musa al-Sadr and saw a renewal in popularity after Israel's invasion of Lebanon in 1978. The Iranian Revolution of 1978–79 also provided momentum for the party. The Amal Movement has 14 members in parliament.
Future Movement تيار المستقبل Tayyār al-Mustaqbal	FM	Saad Hariri	March 14	Mainly Sunni	The Future Movement is a political party affiliated with the Sunni sect but is officially secular. The party held the largest parliamentary bloc from 1996 until 2009. However, after Saad Hariri's boycott, many Sunnis in North II, Beirut II and Akkar chose to follow boycott as well, after which his resignation created a large vacuum in Sunni politics.
Hezbollah حزب الله Ḥizbu 'llāh	HA	Naim Qassem	March 8	Shiite	Hezbollah is a political party and militant group affiliated both demographically and ideologically with the Shia sect. The organization was established as part of an Iranian effort, through funding and the dispatch of a core group of Islamic Revolutionary Guard Corps (pasdaran) instructors, to aggregate a variety of Lebanese Shia groups into a unified organization to resist the Israeli occupation and to grow representation of Shias in government offices.
Islamic Charitable Projects Association جمعية المشاريع الخيرية الإسلامية Jamʿīyah al-Mashārīʿ al-Khayrīyah al-ʾIslāmīyah	ICPA الأحباش al-Aḥbāsh	Shaykh Hussam Qaraqira	March 8	Sunni	The Ahbash have been noted for their ardent criticism of conservative strains of Islam, including the Salafi movement and Wahhabism. The movement has been described as one of the "most controversial Muslim associations" among modern Islamic groups and, within Sunni Islam, opponents of the Ahbash have frequently referred to the movement as unorthodox and deviant.
Islamic Group الجماعة الإسلامية Al-Jama'ah Al-Islamiyah	IG	Azzam Al-Ayyoubi	March 14	Sunni	The Islamic Group is a Sunni Islamist group founded in 1964 as the Lebanese branch of the Muslim Brotherhood. It supports the idea of establishing a legal order in Lebanon that is based on Islamic shari'a. As a local branch it closely follows the doctrines of the Muslim Brotherhood.

==== Druze ====
Party		Leader	Alliance	Primary demographic	Notes
Progressive Socialist Party الحزب التقدمي الإشتراكي Ḥizb at-Taqadummi al-Ishtiraki	PSP	Walid Jumblatt	March 14	Officially Secular Mainly Druze	The Progressive Socialist Party is officially secular and has members from all Lebanese sects, but most of its support comes from the Druze, who support the Jumblatt family, and its regional base is in Mount Lebanon Governorate, especially the Chouf District. During the Lebanese Civil war its militia sympathised with the Palestinians. Despite Jumblatt's initial reluctance to engage in paramilitarism, it built its own military wing, the People's Liberation Army (PLA) which proved to be one of the strongest private armies in the Lebanese Civil War of 1975 to 1990. It conquered much of Mount Lebanon and the Chouf District controlling its own canton.
Lebanese Democratic Party الحزب الديمقراطي اللبناني al-Ḥizb ad-Dimoqrati al-Lubnāni	LDP	Prince Talal Arslan	March 8	Officially Secular Mainly Druze	The Lebanese Democratic Party is officially secular and has members from all Lebanese sects, but most of its support comes from the Druze, who support the Arslan family. It is part of the March 8 Alliance and currently has 0 seats in parliament after the 2022 general elections.
Arab Unification Party تيار النوحيد اللبناني Tayyār at-Tawhid al-Lubnany	LUM	Wiam Wahhab	March 8	Officially secular Mainly Druze	The party supports pan-Arab ideas and gets most of its support from the Druze community in the Chouf district. It is led by Wiam Wahab.

== Social Impacts of Sectarianism ==
Sectarianism shapes Lebanese society on different levels. At the political level, distribution of key state figures and parliamentary seats is done on confessional basis. Also, parties are often organized along confessional lines. Partly due to the state's inability to provide the necessary services, parties and sects provide welfare services to the population, recreating sectarian divide at the societal level. The sectarian affiliation may also shape the access to economic opportunities depending on which group controls the area or sector. Finally, family law, also referred to as personal status law, is determined by confessional community. Therefore, the laws relating to ones personal status, such as inheritance or divorce laws, vary between sects. This leads to difficulties in entering an inter-faith marriage and to tactical conversions.

=== Sectarianism as a Form of Discrimination ===
Lara Deeb's research demonstrates that despite efforts to eliminate structural and institutional practices, interpersonal discrimination endures in Lebanese society. Individuals tend to exhibit "sectarian" behaviors, aligning with themselves own sect while discriminating against others. This discrimination permeates kinship, affecting personal interactions, decisions, assumptions, and conflicts, presenting sectarianism as a hindrance to social cohesion and perpetuating discriminatory practices at both institutional and interpersonal levels.

=== Symbolism in Inter-Sect Marriages ===
Inter-sect marriages, or "mixed-marriages" as Lara Deeb (2024) refers to them, challenge societal norms and can serve as powerful symbols of unity and resistance against sectarianism. This significance was particularly highlighted during the October 2019 Revolution, when people began proudly sharing their inter-sect relationships on social media platforms as a form of resistance against the political system. These unions showcase personal narratives that contribute to reshaping communities and fostering a deeper understanding of shared humanity, representing a collective effort to transcend sectarian divisions.

Mixed-marriages can have several effects. On the one hand, as Maya Mikdashi has found, the sectarian based jurisprudence affects religious conversions of partners in inter-faith marriages, leading to conversions for legal or cultural reasons, as well as multiple codes of family law applying. However, on the other hand, there are examples of mixed-marriages that do not change either partner's sect as Deeb points out.

Inter-sect or mixed-marriages do however have disproportionate effects on partners depending on their gender and the predominant power of patriarchal distinctions in Lebanese society. Therefore, it may put different, albeit usually in all cases still noticeable, forms of pressure on both partners within such couples. This is a major intersection between the concepts of Sectarianism and Sextarianism as coined by Mikdashi and voiced by Deeb.

=== Sectarianism and Gender ===
Scholars such as Mikdashi highlight the intersectionality of sectarianism and gender. Mikdashi introduced the term 'sextarianism' to describe the effects of gender and sect in jurisprudence and state organisation, often to the disadvantage of women. According to Mikdashi, this can be traced back to the 1932 census in Lebanon, where patriarchal ideals were enshrined in legal codes. An example of sextarianism in Lebanon is the citizenship right which is patrilineal. To reflect the effects of 'sextarianism', Mikdashi reflect on the relationship between "sex" and "sect" in Lebanese law through the process where citizenship and sectarian membership is mediated by the personal status courts in Lebanon. As such courts follow recognized religious law (depending on the recognized sect the court represents), rights between spouses Mikdashi argues are unequal to women, leading Lebanese citizens to covert to other officially recognized sects that grant them legal and practical advantages in matters such as inheritance and divorce rights. Such effects, according to Mikdashi are also evident in the legal status and rights of children of Lebanese citizens, where the conversion of the father has much more legal implications than of the mother.

Different meanings of Sectarianism

The term sectarianism carries three different meanings. First of all, it refers to the interpersonal and institutional discrimination against people from a different sect in Lebanese society. Secondly, the term sectarianism signifies the system in which the Lebanese population is divided into eighteen sectarian categories acknowledged by the state. Each denoted sect has to abide by its own personal status laws. Lastly, sectarianism also encompasses Lebanon's political system since 1943, where the eighteen recognised sects are allocated specific political positions according to the National Pact of 1943.

== Refugee question ==
Given the delicate sectarian balance, the Lebanese state tends to avoid demographic alterations when this is possible. This attitude has consequences for what concerns immigration and refugees. According to UNHCR reports, Lebanon hosts the largest number of refugees compared to its national population (1 in 8 at the end of 2020, 1 in 5 if also the 480.000 Palestinians refugees registered with UNRWA are included). The three largest refugee populations are Syrians (840.929 UNHCR refugees in 2022), Palestinians (480.290 UNRWA refugees), and Iraqis (8.983 UNHCR refugees in 2022). Given that the demographic composition of these countries sees a wide majority of Muslims, both Sunni and Shia, and given the impact these numbers have on the Lebanese population, there is a tendency to avoid naturalizing the refugee population within the national one. Refusal of refugees' naturalization means that the refugee population is considered as foreigner, and thus has some restrictions concerning access to jobs, education and health services. For instance, foreign population need a work permit to be able to work, Lebanese must be preferred when hiring and some professions are barred to foreigners.

The case of Palestinians is emblematic in this sense. Palestinian refugees started immigrating in the country since 1948, but since then the great majority of them has never been able to acquire Lebanese citizenship. Officially this policy is determined by Lebanon's support for Palestinians' right of return, but indeed it followed sectarian rules. For instance, Christian Palestinians and those who had kinship ties with Christian families did get chances to be naturalized. Non-acceptance of Palestinians resettlement in Lebanon is also stated in Taif Agreement and was reiterated within the Oslo process. The non-naturalization policies are mainly supported by Christian and Shiite parties: "non-naturalised Palestinians being overwhelmingly Sunni Muslims, their settlement might add troops and a sizeable electoral base to the Sunni faction in Lebanon".

The Syrians also experienced the consequences of this no-naturalization policy, and continue to do so. Since the beginning of the Syrian war, Lebanon adopted a policy of non-recognition of the refugee status to Syrians, rather referring to them as "displaced" or "guests". Thus, the government refused to build any refugee camp, additionally informal camps by NGOs are considered illegal. According to observers, this attitude was guided by the fear that the emergency displacement would have turned into long-term stay, a fear that within the first few years of conflict came true. Long-term stay was an unwelcomed situation both for sectarian balance and the precarious situation of Lebanese economy in general, even though it also translated to a great flow of international humanitarian aids and funding. Despite the fundings, also granted by EU with 2016 Lebanese Compact, Lebanese policy since 2014 has been regulated by the so-called "October Policy". The policy aims at reducing the number of refugees, by closing Syrian borders and encouraging and later planning Syrians return, increasing security and "ease the burdens of local and national authorities". These policies were also guided by the spillovers from the Syrian war, in which Hezbollah soon got involved taking the side of the Syrian regime. In Lebanon this translated to scattered clashes and incidents and therefore to an increasing securitization, operated by different actors including the Lebanese Armed Forces and Hezbollah.

== See also ==
- Sectarianism
- Sectarian violence
- Religion in Lebanon
- Confessionalism
- Za'im system
