= Secularist movement in Lebanon =

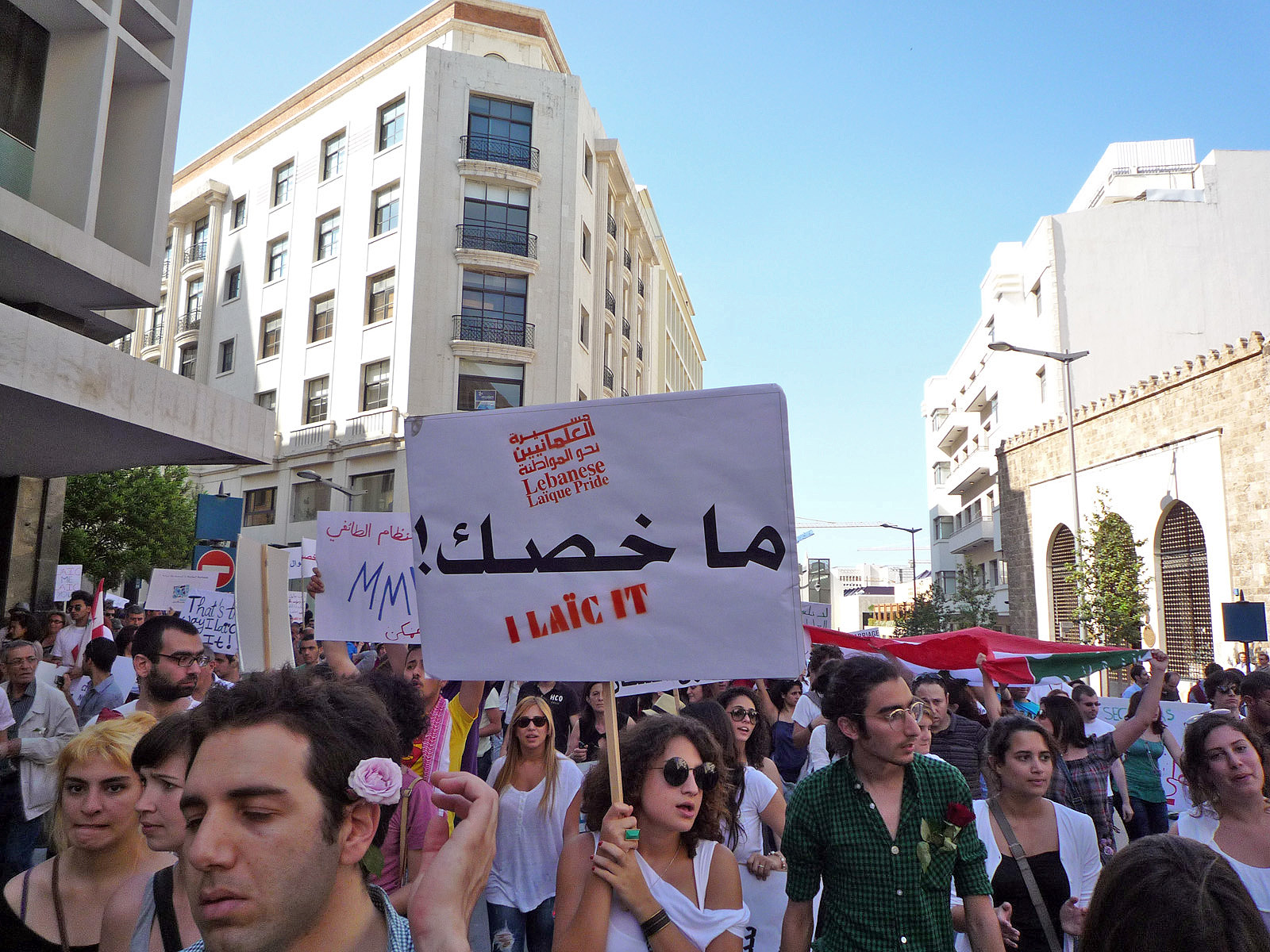
Laïque Pride rally in Beirut Central District, Lebanon

The Secularist Movement in Lebanon has emerged as a response to the country's confessionalist system, deeply rooted in a consociational framework where top offices are allocated based on religious affiliations. This movement, driven by a growing number of Lebanese citizens, advocates for a shift towards secularism within the national government.

In April 2010, Laïque Pride, a secular group co-founded by feminist Yalda Younes, organized a march that drew more than 7,000 participants to Martyrs' Square, Beirut, calling for "an end to the country's deep-rooted sectarian system" and for a "secular Lebanon". Laïque Pride supports the enacting of a unified Civil Code for the Personal Status Law. Notably, the movement gained momentum in response to Hizb ut-Tahrir's influence and calls for an Islamic caliphate in Beirut.

Throughout subsequent years, Laïque Pride continued its advocacy efforts. In 2011, hundreds of protesters rallied in Beirut on 27 February in a Laïque Pride march, calling for reform of the country's confessional political system. At the same time, a peaceful sit-in took place in Saida. At a march in May 2012 in which 600 participated, Laïque Pride issued six demands, four concerning women's rights and two concerning media freedom. Secular student clubs from Saint Joseph University (USJ), the Lebanese Academy of Fine Arts (ALBA), as the American University of Beirut (AUB) also participated in the march. Nearly a decade after the first Laïque Pride march, during the October 2019 uprising, a group of organizers planned a "March for Secularism," drawing inspiration from the Laïque Pride marches held between 2010 and 2013.

== Civil status and secular citizenship campaigns ==
Secular activism in Lebanon has involved legal and bureaucratic campaigns concerning civil marriage and the registration of religious affiliation. Multiple proposals from 1951 to 1998 attempted to introduce civil marriage. In 2011, the civil society organisation Chaml submitted another bill to Parliament. Two Lebanese citizens who had removed their secterian affiliation from their individual records conducted and registered a civil marriage in Lebanon 2013. They relied on Article 17 of Decree 60 LR and French civil law. Another bill was introduced in 2014, but was not enacted. Maya Mikdashi observes that most of these proposals would have created an optional civil marriage system alongside the existing religious systems, rather than replacing them with a unified personal status law. Mikdashi further distinguishes between optional civil marriage and optional secural personal status law. The latter would also regulate matters such as inheritance, child custody and burial.

A similar campaign also sought to remove secterian affiliation from individual civil-registration documents. This campaign was brought up by four citizens and in 2007, a government legal advisory body concluded that freedom of religion included the right to remove secterian identification. In 2009, the Ministry of Interior issued a binding memorandum allowing citizens to replace the reference of their confession with a slash on civil registry records. Participants understood this removal as both a declaration of non secterianism and as a strategy to create sufficient administrative pressure to push the adoption of secular presonal-status legislation. However, Mikdashi argues that the campaign also had an unintended consequence: citizens who removed their sectarian affiliation sometimes became more dependent on religieus authorities, as they were required to demonstrate their religious status to access certain legal rights.

Nonetheless, removing secterian affiliation created legal and administrative difficulties. Marriage, divorce, inheritence, electoral eligibility and the registration of children remained connected to recognised personal status communities. And some citizens who removed their affiliation found themselves unable to exercise those rights. This resulted in administrative directives requiring them to obtain certificates from religious authorities when completing certain procedures. Some participants eventually restored their former affiliation in order to marry, inherit property, register children or obtain employment.

== Evangelical Secularism ==
According to some scholars, such as Maya Mikdashi, the Laique Pride movement in Lebanon demanded, what she calls, an “Evangelical Secularism”. According to this notion, the individuals should first abolish their sectarian attachments and only then they can become secular citizens. What distinguishes Evangelical secularists within this movement is their emphasis on contrasting secularism with sectarianism rather than religion as a whole. In this sense, evangelical secularists did not immediately advocate the abolition of political sectarianism, but rather aimed to promote a "culture of secularism" in the public sphere. Their strategy focused on changing the attitudes of their fellow citizens, believing that only when the influence of sectarian culture diminished could Lebanon safely move away from political sectarianism. However, as pointed out by Maya Mikdashi secular activists did not put much attention to women's rights, it was assumed that ones the "culture of secularism" was homogenously obtained, sexual differences and women's rights will naturally become more liberal. Their main concern regarding political sectarianism is that changing it before citizens are ready could lead to one sect or religion dominating the state, potentially eroding Lebanese pluralism. Maya Mikdashi points to the fact that the evangelical sectarianism movement and aims did not suppress political sectarian lines in society. Instead, secularism created a new category of citizens, on the basis of superior, liberal and progressive moral values.

Evangelical secularism adopts a broad and inclusive approach, drawing inspiration from diverse influences such as Muslim, Christian, statist, leftist, and queer perspectives. The central tenet revolves around a belief in the ability of individuals to transcend sectarian affiliations and to embody the characteristics of modern secular citizens. This form of secularism goes beyond mere ideology, actively pursuing personal growth and fostering integration into communities that transcend sectarian boundaries.

The activism associated with evangelical secularism is characterized by campaigns advocating specific legal reforms. These initiatives include the promotion of an optional civil marriage law, a secular personal status law, and the removal of religious identification from census records. The overall goal of these campaigns is to challenge the dominant influence of religious and sectarian institutions. Advocates emphasize the need for the establishment of a secular or civil personal status, asserting authority over all aspects of life currently governed by religious personal status laws and the Laique Pride march.

The public expression of evangelical secularism is prominently manifested in the Laique Pride marches, which function as a platform that brings together diverse causes and activist groups united under the common banner of secularism. The movement is driven by a collective desire for national unity, a reformed state, and a more resilient social structure. Central to this is the desire to strengthen the state's sovereignty over violence, by bringing gender-based violence from the domestic to the public sphere. Evangelical secularism is positioned as a dynamic force operating at the intersection of secularism and biopolitics, underscoring the intricate relationship between secular ideals and the governance of life.

== Student organizations ==
Student organizations have played a key role in secular movements in Lebanon, particularly those at the American University of Beirut.

One of these secular originations is the Secular Club, a progressive student organization established after the 2008 conflict. According to former club president Joumana Talhouk, the goal of the club is "to create a political space where people from different social and sectarian backgrounds can unite under common principles".

Another organization is the far-left Red Oak Club. According to former president Theresa Sahyoun, the Red Oak Club and the Secular Club managed to find common ground and endorse the August 2016 Martyrs' Square protest.

== See also ==
- Christianity in Lebanon
- Civil Center for National Initiative
- Constitution of Lebanon
- Culture of Lebanon
- Demographics of Lebanon
- Freedom of religion in Lebanon
- Irreligion in Lebanon
- Islam and secularism
- Politics in Lebanon
- Religion in Lebanon
- Sectarianism in Lebanon
- Secularity
- Separation of church and state
