= Freedom of religion in Lebanon =

Freedom of religion in Lebanon is a right protected by the state. However to be a Lebanese citizen one must belong to one of the eighteen recognised religions/sects. The Constitution declares equality of rights and duties for all citizens without discrimination or preference. This is generally respected between the different sects of Lebanon, however discrimination between different sects/religions does happen.

Power is distributed among different religious and sectarian groups. The position of president is reserved for a Maronite Christian; the role of Presidency of Parliament for a Shiite Muslim; and the role of Prime Minister for a Sunni Muslim. The government has generally respected these rights; however, the National Pact agreement in 1943 restricted the constitutional provision for apportioning political offices according to religious affiliation. There have been periodic reports of tension between religious groups, attributable to competition for political power, and citizens continue to struggle with the legacy of the civil war that was fought along sectarian lines.

In 2023, the non-profit organization Freedom House gave the country a 3 out of 4 score for religious freedom. The Freedom House is a think tank based and funded by the United States. The think tank focuses on studying the expression of freedom around the world.

== Religious demography ==
Lebanon, founded as a modern state in 1943, has a population of over 5 million. Because parity among confessional groups remains a sensitive issue, a national census has not been conducted since 1932. However, the most recent demographic study conducted in 2012 by Statistics Lebanon, a Beirut-based research firm, estimated Lebanon's population at approximately 54% Muslim (27% Shia; 27% Sunni), 5.6% Druze and 40.4% Christian (21% Maronite, 8% Greek Orthodox, 5% Melkite, 1% Protestant, 4% Armenian, 1% other Christians). The Druze do not consider themselves to be Muslims, but under the Lebanese political division (Parliament of Lebanon Seat Allocation) the community is designated as one of the five Lebanese Muslim communities (Sunni, Shia, Druze, Alawi, and Ismaili). Lastly there are, in significantly smaller numbers, Jews, Baháʼís, Mormons, Buddhists, and Hindus.

From the eighteen officially recognized religious groups, four are Muslim, twelve are Christian, one is Druze, and one is Jewish. The main branches of Islam are Shi'a and Sunni. The smallest Muslim communities are splintered from Shi'ism, such as the Alawites and the Ismaili ("Sevener") Shi'a order. The Maronite community, by far the largest Christian group, has had a centuries-long affiliation with the Roman Catholic Church but has its own patriarch, liturgy, and ecclesiastical customs. The second largest Christian group is the Greek Orthodox Church who maintains a Greek-language liturgy. Other Lebanese Christians are Melkite Catholics; Protestant Christians like evangelicals (including Protestant groups such as the Baptists and Seventh-day Adventists); and Latins (Roman Catholic). Other non-native to Lebanon Christian groups are divided among Armenian Orthodox (Gregorians); Armenian Catholics; Syriac Orthodox (Jacobites); Syriac Catholics; Assyrians (Assyrian Church of the East); Chaldean Catholics; and Copts. The Lebanese Druze, who refer to themselves as al-Muwahhideen (Arabic: الموحدين), or "believers in one God," are concentrated in the rural, mountainous areas located east and south of Beirut. Divisions and rivalries between various groups date back many centuries, and while relationships between religious adherents of different confessions were generally amicable, group identity was highly significant in most aspects of cultural interaction.

Foreign missionaries present in the country operated their missions in schools, hospitals, and places of worship.

Many people fleeing from religious mistreatment and discrimination in neighboring states have immigrated to Lebanon. These people include Kurds, Shi'a, and Assyrians from Iraq, as well as Copts from Egypt, Sudan and Libya. Precise figures were unavailable due to the lack of census data and assimilation of these groups into society.

== Legal and policy framework ==
In Lebanon, freedom of religion and religious choice are manifestations of the modern state. The Constitution of Lebanon provides for freedom of religion and the freedom to practice all religious rites provided that the public order is not disturbed. According to Article 9 of the Lebanese Constitution, all religions and creeds are to be protected and the exercise of freedom of religion is to be guaranteed providing that the public order is not disturbed. The Constitution requires the state to respect all religions and denominations and guarantee respect for the personal status and religious interests of persons of every religious sect. It also declares equality of rights and duties for all citizens without discrimination or preference but stipulates a balance of power distributed among the major religious groups. The Government generally respected these rights in practice; however, there were some restrictions, and the constitutional provision for apportioning political offices according to religious affiliation may be viewed as inherently discriminatory.

The Government permits recognized religious groups to exercise authority over matters pertaining to personal status, such as marriage, divorce, child custody, and inheritance. The "Twelver" Shi'a, Sunni, Christian, and Druze confessions have state-appointed, government-subsidized clerical courts that administer family and personal status law.

The Constitution provides that Lebanese Christians and Lebanese Muslims be represented equally in Parliament, the Cabinet, and high-level civil service positions, which include the ministry ranks of Secretary General and Director General. It also provides that these posts be distributed proportionally among the recognized religious groups. The constitutional provision for the distribution of political power and positions according to the principle of religious representation is designed to prevent a dominant position being gained by any one confessional group. The National Pact of 1943 stipulates that the president, prime minister, and speaker of parliament be Maronite Christian, Sunni Muslim, and Shi'a Muslim, respectively. This distribution of political power functions at both the national and local levels of government.

The 1989 Taif Agreement, which ended the country's 15-year civil war, reaffirmed this arrangement but, significantly, mandated increased Muslim representation in Parliament so that it would be equal to that of the Christian community and reduced the power of the Christian Maronite presidency. In addition, the Taif Agreement, which concluded the country's 15-year civil war, endorsed the constitutional provision of appointing most senior government officials according to religious affiliation. This practice is operative in all three branches of government. The Taif Agreement also stipulated a cabinet with power equally allocated between Muslims and Christians. The political establishment has been reluctant to change this "confessional" system, because citizens perceive it as critical to the country's stability.

Formal recognition by the Government is a legal requirement for religious groups to conduct most religious activities. A group that seeks official recognition must submit a statement of its doctrine and moral principles for government review to ensure that such principles do not contradict popular values or the Constitution. The group must ensure that the number of its adherents is sufficient to maintain its continuity.

Alternatively, religious groups may apply for recognition through recognized religious groups. Official recognition conveys certain benefits, such as tax-exempt status and the right to apply the religion's codes to personal status matters.

Some religious groups do not enjoy official recognition, such as Baháʼís, Buddhists, Hindus, and unregistered Protestant Christian groups. They are disadvantaged under the law in that their members do not qualify for certain government positions, but they are permitted to perform their religious rites freely. For example, a follower of the Baháʼí Faith cannot run for Parliament as a Baháʼí candidate because there is no seat allocated for the confession, nor could such an individual hold senior positions in the Government, as these are also allocated on a confessional basis. However, a number of members of unregistered religious groups are recorded under the recognized religions. For example, most Baháʼís are registered under the Shi'a sect. As such, a member of the Baháʼí community can run for office and fill a seat allocated to the Shi'a sect. Similarly, Mormons are registered under the Greek Orthodox faith. Government decisions on granting official recognition of religious groups do not appear to be arbitrary.

The Government permits the publication in different languages of religious materials of every registered religion.

The Government recognizes the following holy days as national holidays: Armenian Christmas, Eid al-Adha, St. Maroun Day, Islamic New Year, Ashura, Good Friday, Easter (both Western and Eastern rites), the birth of the Prophet Muhammad, All Saints' Day, Feast of the Assumption, Eid al-Fitr, and Christmas. The Government also excuses Armenian public sector employees from work on St. Vartan Day.

=== Conversion ===
An individual may change religions if the head of the religious group the person wishes to join approves of this change. Refusal is not reported to occur in practice. Religion is encoded on national identity cards and noted on ikhraaj qaid (official registry) documents, and the Government complies with requests of citizens to change their civil records to reflect their new religious status. Even though both man and women have the right to convert conversion doesn't always have equal effects for both, such as in marriage. In Lebanese law the religion of the husband determines the legal sect that his children fall under, not the mother, in case of conversion.

In Lebanon, proselytizing (or converting people to another religion) is not punishable by law. As Maya Mikdashi shows in her analysis of religious conversion in Lebanon, changing one's religion was a practice embedded in and maintained by the secular state.

Religious conversion does not always imply a shift in one's belief. In many cases, people viewed religious conversion as a way to transcend bureaucratic categories or leverage laws. For instance, one can convert to protect their inheritance. It is not just common to convert to a religion for legal advantages, but it's possible to convert back after the court case. For example, there are cases in which a person converted to Christianity went to court and simply converted back to Sunni Islam.

== Restrictions on religious freedom ==
The 1989 Ta'if Agreement called for the eventual elimination of political sectarianism in favor of "expertise and competence". However, little progress has been made in this regard.

Unrecognized groups, such as Baháʼís, Buddhists, Hindus, and some evangelical denominations, may own property and assemble for worship without government interference. However, they are disadvantaged under the law because legally they may not marry, divorce, or inherit property in the country. Protestant evangelical churches are required to register with the Evangelical Synod, a nongovernmental advisory group that represents those churches with the Government. It is self-governing and oversees religious matters for Protestant congregations. Representatives of some churches have complained that the Synod has refused to accept new Protestant groups into its membership since 1975, thereby crippling their clergy's ability to minister to the members of those communities Many families have relatives who belong to different religious communities, and intermarriage is not uncommon; however, intermarriage is difficult to arrange in practice between members of some groups. Shari'a, which applies to personal status matters of Muslims, forbids the marriage of a non-Muslim male to a Muslim woman. Druze religious leaders will perform marriages only of Druze couples. There are no procedures for civil marriage; however, the Government recognizes civil marriage ceremonies performed outside the country.

The Government does not require citizens' religious affiliations to be indicated on their passports; however, religious affiliation is encoded on national identity cards and noted on ikhraaj qaid (Arabic: إخراج قيد) documents. The ikhraj qaid, a civil document that indicates personal status information, can be presented by citizens instead of an identity card when they apply for various purposes, such as to obtain government employment or to enroll in or be employed at a university.

In most cases, religious groups administer their own family and personal status laws. Many of these laws discriminate against women. For example, Sunni inheritance law provides a son twice the inheritance of a daughter. Although Muslim men may divorce easily, Muslim women may do so only with the concurrence of their husbands.

Article 473 of the Penal Code of Lebanon stipulates a maximum prison term of 1 year for anyone convicted of "blaspheming God publicly." There were no prosecutions reported under this law during the reporting period.

Students and teachers found to be working while on tourist visas are deemed to have violated their visa status and are consequently deported. The same sanction applies to religious workers not working under the auspices of a government-registered religious organization.

There were no reports of religious prisoners or detainees in the country.

== Interreligious and intersect marriages ==
As described above in "Religious Demography", there are a variety of sects and religious groups in Lebanon. Sects in Lebanon are based on several factors, including religion and ethnicity. Additionally, different sects are associated with different socioeconomic backgrounds. The combination of all these factors, create that -although depending on the region in Lebanon or the neighborhood in the city (especially Beirut)- Lebanese people live their lives segregated from other groups to a certain extent. Nevertheless, in daily lived experiences there is interaction of all sorts between different sects, especially in neighborhoods such as Ras Beirut. Demonstrating that sectarian lines are not fixed or impossible to cross, but rather reproduced and challenged via every-day actions. Nevertheless, marriages can face difficulty in receiving support or acceptance from the family.

Whether families accept interreligious (or intersect) marriage depends on several factors which are defined by feelings affinity or similarity (which is thought to lead to a harmonious marriage and thus the well-being of the people, which are important factors for parental consensus). People's exposure to different sects and religions; and knowability about the future in-laws, and the commonality they experience towards the (family of) the partner, indicate their approach toward interreligious marriages. In some occasions, the age of the bride, the economic status of the groom and how religious the family is may also play a role to accept or reject an interreligious or intersect marriage. These factors does not guarantee acceptance or tolerance, but they have influence.

== See also ==
- Religion in Lebanon
- Secularism in Lebanon
- Human rights in Lebanon
