= Islam in Lebanon =

Islam in Lebanon الإسلام في لبنان
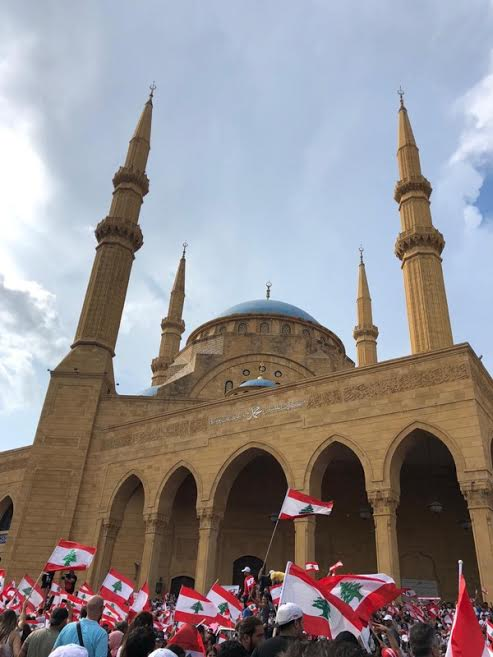
- Mohammad Al-Amin Mosque during 2019 Lebanese revolution

Total population
- 2-3.5 million

Religions
- Shia Islam, Sunni Islam, Alawite, Ismaili

Sects of Islam in Lebanon (2020)
Muslim denomination	percent
Sunni Muslims	31.9%
Twelver Shia Muslims	31.2%

Islam has a long, continuous history in Lebanon. The majority of the Lebanese population in Lebanon is Muslim, although the precise percentage is difficult to ascertain by the Hezbollah–Israel conflict. The Lebanese constitution officially guarantees freedom of religion for government-registered religions, including five denominations of Islam, although a blasphemy law and restrictions on religious groups that "disturb the public order" exist as well. Under the Taif Agreement, Muslims are allocated proportional representation across multiple governmental positions.

The Lebanese Druze community are sometimes counted as a branch of Islam within Lebanon, though most Druze followers do not consider themselves Muslim and do not follow the Five Pillars of Islam.

== Demographics ==
Lebanese Muslims
Year	Percent
1932	42.0%
1985	68.0%
2010	54.0%
2012	53.5%
2014	56.9%
2018	61.1%
2022	53.4%

It is difficult to obtain precise demographic information within Lebanon, as the country has not had an official census since 1932. In that census, Muslims amounted to 42% of the population (with slightly more Sunni than Shia Muslims), but Christians (primarily Maronites) composed a small majority of the population. Lebanon was a French mandate between World War I and World War II, and was founded in part to serve as a home for Christians within West Asia.

Demographic estimates since the 1932 census have found a significantly higher proportion of Muslims than the census did. This increase is not generally believed to be a result of population changes, but rather due to less biased estimation processes.

Current demographic estimates generally agree that Muslims represent the majority of the Lebanese population, though estimates range from 60 to 70% of the Lebanese population. According to the May 2025 edition of the CIA World Factbook, the Muslim population is estimated to be 67.8%, (Note: the estimate is 72.3% if Druze are included as Muslim) of which approximately 47% are Sunni, 47% are Shia, and the remainder are Alawite or Ismaili. Pew Research estimated the 2020 proportion of Muslims in Lebanon in 2020 at 61.2%. Statistics Lebanon, a non-governmental research firm, estimated that 69.3% of Lebanese people Muslims, with approximately 45% of these Muslims being Shia, 45% being Sunni, and 10% being Alawite or Ismaili. A Central Intelligence Agency (CIA) study in 1985 put the numbers of Muslims at 68% of the population in 1985.

The Druze are sometimes designated as one of the five Lebanese Muslim communities (Sunni, Shia, Druze, Alawi, and Ismaili), even though most Druze do not identify as Muslims, and they do not accept the five pillars of Islam.

In Lebanon, the different Muslim sects are spread across distinct regions. Sunnis are mainly concentrated in West Beirut, Tripoli in the north, Sidon in the south, and parts of the Bekaa Valley such as Arsal. Shias are largely based in South Lebanon, particularly around Tyre, Nabatieh, and Bint Jbeil, as well as in the Bekaa Valley around Baalbek and Hermel, and in Beirut’s southern suburbs known as Dahieh. Alawites, who make up a very small community, are mostly found in the Jabal Mohsen neighborhood of Tripoli.

Distribution of Lebanese muslims in 2014
1. Lebanese Sunni Muslims (49.7%)
2. Lebanese Shia Muslims (48.9%)
3. Alawites (1.43%)
Distribution of Lebanese muslims in 2022
1. Lebanese Sunni Muslims (49.6%)
2. Lebanese Shia Muslims (48.9%)
3. Alawites (1.47%)

In 2014, according to *وقائع إنتخابية عن لبنان، حسب لوائح الناخبين الرسمية الصادرة عن وزارة الداخلية اللبنانية لسنة ٢٠١٤*, Muslims made up 56.9% of registered voters aged 21 and above: 28.26% Sunnis, 27.83% Shias, and 0.81% Alawites. In 2022, based on the registered voters aged 21+ for the elections, Muslims represented 56.83%: 28.21% Sunnis, 27.77% Shias, and 0.84% Alawites. The overall proportions remained very stable between 2014 and 2022, with only slight increases in all three groups.

Year	Muslims			
Year	Total	Sunnis	Shias	Alawites
2014	56.9%	28.26%	27.83%	0.81%
2022	56.83%	28.21%	27.77%	0.84%

Year	Muslims			
Year	Total	Sunnis	Shias	Alawites
2014	1 999 770	993 124	978 043	28 603
2022	2 272 545	1 128 282	1 110 707	33 556
Growth	+272 775	+135 158	+132 664	+4 953
% growth	▲12.00%	▲11.98%	▲11.94%	▲14.76%

Distribution of Lebanese Muslims by governorates
Governorates of Lebanon	2014		2022	
Governorates of Lebanon	Pop.	%	Pop.	%
Nabatieh Governorate	362 100	85.59%	387 513	78.79%
South Governorate	308 976	78.34%	362 277	78.11%
North Governorate	306 989	54.63%	353 253	55.63%
Beirut Governorate	285 542	61.17%	313 610	59.31%
Baalbek-Hermel Governorate	250 655	85.79%	280 120	84.25%
Akkar Governorate	186 098	72.27%	221 292	73.26%
Beqaa Governorate	155 190	51.59%	174 990	50.9%
Mount Lebanon Governorate	119 248	18.41%	133 700	18.78%
Keserwan-Jbeil Governorate	24 972	14.68%	22 120	12.08%
Total Lebanese Muslim population	1 999 770	56.9%	2 272 545	56.83%

Repartition of Lebanese Sunni Muslims by governorates
Governorates of Lebanon	2014		2022	
Governorates of Lebanon	Pop.	%	Pop.	%
North Governorate	286 292	28.83%	330 089	29.02%
Beirut Governorate	211 862	21.33%	231 695	20.37%
Akkar Governorate	170 566	17.17%	202 146	17.77%
Beqaa Governorate	109 859	11.06%	121 858	10.71%
Mount Lebanon Governorate	70 918	7.14%	75 289	6.62%
South Governorate	68 671	6.93%	79 501	6.99%
Baalbek-Hermel Governorate	41 084	4.14%	48 328	4.25%
Nabatieh Governorate	30 716	3.09%	36 877	3.24%
Keserwan-Jbeil Governorate	3 156	0.32%	2 499	0.22%
Total Lebanese Sunni population	993 124	100%	1 128 282	100%

Repartition of Lebanese Shia Muslims by governorates
Governorates of Lebanon	2014		2022	
Governorates of Lebanon	Pop.	%	Pop.	%
Nabatieh Governorate	346 331	35.41%	374 296	33.61%
South Governorate	240 280	24.57%	282 768	25.39%
Baalbek-Hermel Governorate	209 463	21.42%	231 702	20.8%
Beirut Governorate	73 517	7.52%	81 915	7.35%
Mount Lebanon Governorate	52 701	5.39%	58 411	5.24%
Beqaa Governorate	45 313	4.63%	53 132	4.77%
Keserwan-Jbeil Governorate	17 210	1.76%	19 617	1.76%
North Governorate	5 201	0.53%	5 288	0.47%
Akkar Governorate	3 012	0.31%	3 578	0.32%
Total Lebanese Shia population	978 043	100%	1 110 707	100%

Distribution of Lebanese Alawites by governorates
Governorates of Lebanon	2014		2022	
Governorates of Lebanon	Pop.	%	Pop.	%
North Governorate	15 496	54.18%	17 876	53.27%
Akkar Governorate	12 520	43.77%	15 568	46.39%
Mount Lebanon Governorate	220	0.77%	0	0%
Beirut Governorate	163	0.57%	0	0%
Baalbek-Hermel Governorate	108	0.38%	90	0.27%
Nabatieh Governorate	38	0.13%	10	0.03%
South Governorate	25	0.09%	8	0.02%
Beqaa Governorate	18	0.06%	0	0%
Keserwan-Jbeil Governorate	15	0.05%	4	0.01%
Total Lebanese Alawite population	28 603	100%	33 556	100%

== Current political and religious issues ==
Although Lebanon is officially a secular country, religious identity and religious leadership play significant roles for the Lebanese government. Religious groups must register with the Lebanese government, and citizens report their religious identity to the Ministry of Interior’s (MOI’s) Personal Status Directorate. The government considers the Druze a sect of Islam. Religious identities play a critical role in maintaining the balance of power within the Lebanese government; the National Pact of 1943 guarantees that the Prime Minister must be a Sunnite, and the Speaker of Parliament must be a Shiite, and the President must be a Maronite Christian. Under the National Pact, 45% of the governmental and parliamentary positions were reserved for Muslims. Since the Taif Agreement in 1990, this has been revised to a 50-50 split between Muslims and Christians.

Family matters such as marriage, divorce and inheritance are still handled by the religious authorities representing a person's faith. Calls for civil marriage are unanimously rejected by the religious authorities but civil marriages conducted in another country are recognized by Lebanese civil authorities.

Atheism is not recognized by the state. However, the Minister of the Interior Ziad Baroud made it possible in 2009 to have the religious sect removed from one’s Lebanese identity card. This does not, however, deny religious authorities complete control over civil family issues inside the country.

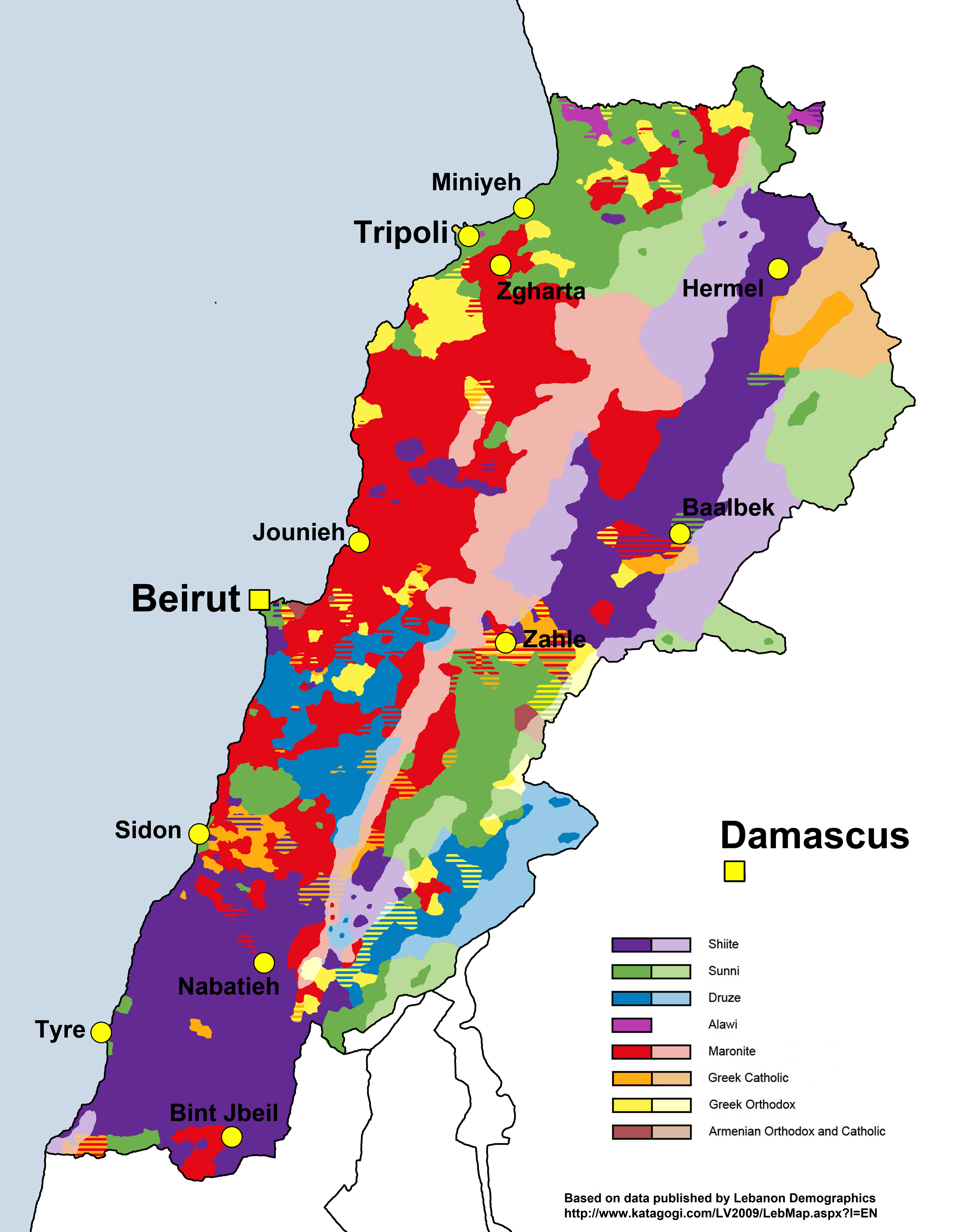
Distribution of Lebanon's religious groups according to 2009 municipal election data.

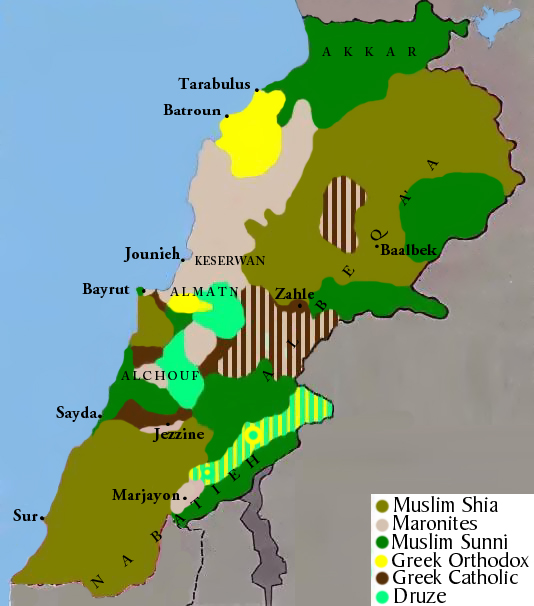
An estimate of the area distribution of Lebanon's main religious groups.

== Branches ==
Lebanese Muslims are divided into many branches like Shiites, Sunnis, Alawites, and Ismailis.

The Druze are sometimes considered a fifth branch of Islam for governmental purposes, despite significant religious differences between the faiths most don't identify as Muslims.

=== Shia Islam ===
The Lebanese Shia Muslims are around 29%-31% of the total population. Twelvers are the predominant Shia group, followed by Alawites and Ismailis. The Speaker of Parliament is always a Shi'a Muslim, as it is the only high post that Shi'as are eligible for. The Shiites are largely concentrated in northern and central Beqaa, Southern Lebanon, in south Beirut (southern parts of Greater Beirut).

=== Sunni Islam ===
The Lebanese Sunni Muslims constitute around 27%–29% of the total population with the Hanafi and Shafiʽi madhhab being the predominant Sunni groups. Sunni notables traditionally held power in the Lebanese state together, and they are still the only ones eligible for the post of Prime Minister Sunnis form the majority in west Beirut, Tripoli, Sidon, Central and Western Beqaa and hasbaya, ikleem al kharroub, Miniyeh, and Danniyeh districts, and Akkar in the north.

Several large Sufi orders are active in the country, including the Naqshbandi and Qadiriyya tariqas.

=== Druze ===
The Lebanese Druze constitute 5% of the population and can be found primarily in Mount Lebanon and the Shouf District. Under the Lebanese political division (Parliament of Lebanon Seat Allocation) the Druze community is designated as one of the five Lebanese Muslim communities (Sunni, Shia, Druze, Alawi, and Ismaili). Most Druze do not identify as Muslims.

== See also ==
- Religion in Lebanon
- Secularism in Lebanon
- Christianity in Lebanon
- Shia Islam in Lebanon
- Sunni Islam in Lebanon
- Druze in Lebanon
