= Sextarianism =

2022 book

- Author: Maya Mikdashi
- Published: May 2022
- Publisher: Stanford University Press
- ISBN: 978-1-5036-3156-4

Sextarianism: Sovereignty, Secularism and the State in Lebanon is a 2022 book by Maya Mikdashi, published by Stanford University Press. In the work, Mikdashi explores the relationship between sect, sex and sexuality in Lebanon.

== Premise ==
Mikdashi argues that sectarianism cannot be studied in isolation, because the practice of sectarianism always goes hand in hand with the practice of sexism. Moreover, she states that the category 'sect' is already a patriarchal inheritance. Mikdashi argues that a person's sect is not determined by faith. It is determined by the sect of their father. For this reason, she proposes the term "sextarianism". Sex, sexuality and sect together define citizenship, and, since the concept of citizenship is the basis of the modern nation-state, sextarianism therefore forms the basis for the legal bureaucratic systems of the state and thus for state power. Complete citizenship requires membership in of the one eighteen sects, which needs to recognized by the Lebanese state. This system was established by the French mandate. The system itself recognized communities on the basis of their own personal status law. Citizenship itself is inherited through the father. Lebanese men can pass their nationality to foreign wives and to their children. Lebanese women cannot. It emphasizes how state power articulates, disarticulates, and manages sexual difference bureaucratically, ideologically, and legally. To further illustrate the dimensions by which the dynamics of sextarianism in Lebanese society can be explained, Mikdashi refers to two central concepts: Evangelical Secularism (chapter 4), and the Epidermal State (chapter 5).

=== Evangelical Secularism and the Epidermal State ===
Evangelical secularism as coined by Mikdashi refers to the idea that secularism is the opposite of sectarianism rather than of religion and the belief that the state should be secular in its practice in addition to being anchored in the culture of the citizens of the state. Mikdashi uses 'evangelical' secularism because she links it to daʿwah (Arabic: دعوة, Arabic: [ˈdaʕwah], "invitation"), which scholars have used to study how Islamic reformers try to produce ethical Muslims by saturating life with Islamic morality and practices. Likewise, evangelical secularists intend to induce people with a secular culture to produce modern secular citizens. This is seen as a necessary step before political change can succeed. In this understanding, religion should be something that is only expressed and of significance in the private sphere. For them, being secular is a choice, just as they are convinced that religion is a choice. They believe that individuals should identify with their state as citizens rather than identifying with a sect as political identification. However, Mikdashi warns that the idea that secular people are modern citizens produces a hierarchy between those who identify as secular citizens and those who do not.

The 'epidermal' state refers to epidermis, the skin, but Mikdashi uses it more broadly to refer to the body. She argues that state power uses the body as a site of interrogation to make sex and sexuality visible in order to regulate it. The state does this based on laws, medical practices, bureaucracy and violence which are not based on natural truths or distinctions but on constructed differences. These practices disproportionally target vulnerable people such as women, queer people, refugees and migrant workers. Mikdashi argues that state sovereignty decides what legal use of violence is while they are rarely held accountable for excessive violence.

=== Sextarianism ===
Sextarianism builds on Joan Scott’s theorization of the constitutive nature of sexual difference to the history of secularism. According to Mikdashi, sextarianism provided her with the chance to examine the Lebanese state without separating or favoring sectarian differences from sexual differences. This approach is rooted in the ways the state regulates and creates both sexual and sectarian distinctions. The Lebanese legal system shapes sexual difference across various areas of law. Mikdashi argues that sexual difference plays a more significant role as a legal cateogry than sectarian difference. The Lebanese state handles both sexual and sectarian differences through its judicial and governmental/bureaucratic structures. Mikdashi ties this development to the concepts of the evangelical and state-based secularism which by emphasising the sectarian sphere through its sovereignty, securitisation, and citizenship laws, manages to enshrine its view into society. The second concept, the epidermal state, is used by Mikdashi to show the site and mode with which states manifest their power to enforce sextarianism.

The examples Mikdashi uses to construct this term are mostly on hymen and anal examinations conducted by (mostly) the state, functioning as examples of the state enacting sextarian bodily violence, relying on different gendered preconceptions and tools of the state.

Although sextarianism is introduced in the context of Lebanon, the term is applicable beyond the Lebanese example. Mikdashi argues that sectarianism in Lebanon functions merely as a bureaucratic rather than a purely religious system, which makes sextarianism relevant to any context where bureaucratic governance of personal status laws intersects with gender.

Mikdashi also refers to the idea that sextarianism unpacks how heterosexuality, the sex binary, and civil and criminal law are key to secularism's management of sexual and religious difference, with secularism's investment in sex manifesting as the regulation of straight and queer sexualities and a sex-gender binary system.
