= National Pact =

Lebanese confessionalist agreement

The National Pact (Arabic: الميثاق الوطني, romanized: al Mithaq al Watani) is an unwritten agreement that laid the foundation of Lebanon as a multiconfessional state following negotiations between the Shia, Sunni, Maronite, and Druze leaderships. Enacted in the summer of 1943, the National Pact was formed by President Bechara El Khoury and Prime Minister Riad Al Solh. Mainly centered around the interests of political elites, the Maronite elite served as a voice for the Christian population of Lebanon, while the Sunni elite represented the voice of the Muslim population. The pact also established Lebanon's independence from France.

Key points of the agreement stipulate that:

- Lebanese Christians do not seek Western intervention, and accept that Lebanon had Arab features.
- Lebanese Muslims abandon their aspirations to unite with Syria and the Arab World.
- The president of the Republic and the commander of the Lebanese Armed Forces must be Maronite Catholic.
- The prime minister of the Republic must be a Sunni Muslim.
- The speaker of the Parliament must be a Shia Muslim.
- The deputy speaker of the Parliament and the deputy prime minister must be Greek Orthodox Christian.
- The chief of the General Staff of the Lebanese Armed Forces must be a Druze.
- There must be a ratio of 6:5 in favour of Christians to Muslims (and Druze) in the Lebanese Parliament.

Lebanese Muslims
Year	Percent
1932	42%
1985	75%
2010	54%
2012	53.5%
2020	67.8%

Lebanese Christians
Year	Percent
1932	51%
1985	25%
2010	40.5%
2012	41%
2020	32.4%

A Christian majority of 51% in the 1932 census was the underpinning of a government structure that gave the Christians control of the presidency, command of the armed forces, and parliamentary majority. However, following a wider trend, the generally poorer Muslim population has increased faster than the richer Christians. Additionally, the Christians were emigrating in large numbers, further eroding their only marginal population edge, and it soon became clear that Christians wielded a disproportionate amount of power. As years passed without a new census, dissatisfaction with the government structure and sectarian rifts increased, eventually sparking the Lebanese Civil War. The Taif Agreement of 1989 changed the ratio of Parliament to 1:1 and reduced the power of the Maronite president; it also provided that eventually, the Parliament would become bicameral, with a Senate representing religious communities and a Chamber of Deputies chosen on a non-sectarian basis. It is commonly believed that once this bicameral Parliament is established, the Senate would have a 1:1 Christian-to-Muslim ratio similarly to the current Parliament and the president of the Senate would be required to be a Druze, in accordance with the dictates of the National Pact.

== History ==
=== Pursuit of Lebanese independence ===
In 1922, the French Mandate of Syria and Lebanon assigned France control of the government of what are now Lebanon and Syria, separating them from the former Ottoman Empire. It provided for the placement of French troops within both nations in order to defend both states and their sovereignty, in addition to establishing Lebanese and Syrian militias to support the Mandate. Additionally, the French mandate allowed France complete access to infrastructure in both Lebanon and Syria, sole control over their foreign relations, and power over the excavation and archeological research of antique artifacts in both countries. It established the official languages in both nations as French and Arabic. Also, it specified that France must report back to the League of Nations on a yearly basis with a report of the progress in Lebanon and Syria.

Though promising both countries financial compensation and reimbursement for these decisions, there was significant pushback from those in both Syria and Lebanon. In Lebanon specifically, prior to attaining independence, much of the government's efforts and politics in general were simply centered around gaining independence from France. When finally on the verge of attaining independence, the difficulty in finding effective ways of organizing the government became most apparent given the enormous religious diversity of the country. The creation of the National Pact gave Lebanon a solidified structure to pursue with their new found independence, though not necessarily appeasing all religious groups within the country. For many, it provided a necessary order and an outward sense of unity and multi-confessionalism that would allow them to maintain their own political state..

=== Implications of the 1932 Lebanese census ===
In 1932, the Lebanese government under French mandate conducted a census that ultimately determined political representation within the Lebanese government after acquiring independence through the National Pact. The census served not only to ascertain the ratios of different religious sects within Lebanon, ultimately determining their ratios within the government, but it also determined Lebanese citizenship through a focus on the documentation of immigrants. Because the results of the census demonstrated a Maronite Christian majority of 51%, the National Pact then set in place the requirements of a Maronite Christian always holding the presidency and the parliament having a 6:5 ratio in favor of Christians.

Controversies arose in response to the census, the first of which being that the census did not provide accurate definition of Lebanese citizenship. Instead, it worked off a definition created by the Ottoman Empire defining it as a presence in Lebanon during August 1924, the last time such a presence would have been recorded. This made it difficult to assure that the resulting ratios enumerated by the census were entirely accurate representations of the demographics of the population. Because of this, some argued that the census itself was biased, that it was created with the intention of maintaining a status quo representation of Lebanon as a Western Euro-American-allied Christian nation and that it helped maintain the power of the elites.

This would be increasingly important as the 1932 Lebanese census became the basis for the creation of all of the ratios defined within the National Pact, perpetuating power of the Maronite Christians within the government in Lebanon. Because Maronite Christians were more closely aligned with the French authorities and French interests in Lebanon, many feared that their subsequent power and the establishment of the National Pact assuring Lebanese independence was undertaken with purpose of adhering to French interests.

== Introduction and reception ==
The National Pact was first introduced to the public on October 7, 1943, by Riad Al Solh in his ministerial declaration in attempts to present a uniquely Lebanese identity, separate from both the Western and the Eastern worlds. They chose to depict the National Pact as a representation of the fundamental base for shared belief between the different sects of Lebanon. Additionally, the elite reiterated that this was the only way that Lebanon could attain independence and, that though Sunnis may be unhappy with the lack of union with Syria, the definition of Lebanon having Arab features is the best form of compromise. Unfortunately for the Lebanese elite, however, this was no guarantee that the public would receive it well. The assumption that the Lebanese public would immediately support the National Pact simply because of the elite consensus was not an accurate one. Generally, there continued to be dissenting voices towards the Pact throughout its establishment, none of which taking hold to create any legitimate change to the government that it put in place.

Though this dissent did exist amongst various groups, the established system was generally tolerated by most sects until 1958, when the threats to the National Pact in tandem with other political conflict lead to disruption of the order that the Pact had established in Lebanon.

== Implications ==
=== Immobilism ===
It is argued that the National Pact created immobilism, which led to "administrative inefficiency both in decision-making and implementation". Although Lebanon went through huge social mobility, such as a rapid demographic change and urbanization after its independence, the state could not deal with social inequality and public discontent, because of the rigid form of power-sharing which lacked flexibility to accommodate changes in society. Once power-sharing took its form, it became the political and economic interests of those in power to maintain the system.

=== Sectarian divisions ===
It is also argued that the National Pact cemented the extant sectarian divisions by institutionalizing them through power-sharing. Politicians were usually regarded as representing religious communities, which resulted in non-coherent policy in the government. "The state-idea of Lebanon, fragile as it was, strengthened the sectarian differences already extant".

=== Lebanese Civil War ===
The weakness of state and lack of national identity with fragmented sub-national segments made Lebanon susceptible to external factors. "The external dimension of the National Pact" was characterized with neutrality either toward "the Christian West or the Islamic Arab world". Such attitude could be maintained as long as "faulty assumption" "that the balance-of-power in the region would remain unchanged" was valid. However, in reality, external environment around Lebanon after its independence dramatically changed. Specifically, two threats to the power of the National Pact in addition to the rising tensions between Muslims and Christians over political power in tandem to nearby violence of the Arab-Israeli War and accusations of a corrupt election all led to the Lebanese Civil War.

Specifically, the first violation of the National Pact occurred when Lebanon accepted assistance through the Eisenhower doctrine. The second threat to the National Pact occurred when the Egyptian-Syrian United Arab Republic and the Pan-Arab Campaign began pushing Lebanon to join and unite with other Arab countries, threatening the portion of the National Pact identifying Lebanon as an independent nation separate from other countries in the region. On top of the nearby violence and the threats to the National Pact, there was also increased tension between the Muslim sects within Lebanon and the Christian sects. Many larger groups began fragmenting, some uniting with Palestinian refugees fleeing the Arab-Israeli War, some of them joining leftist groups and opposing the National Pact, certain groups' stress about involvement of the Lebanese military, and also various right wing organizations who agreed with the National Pact and its maintenance of national order.

== Controversy ==
Though technically at the time of its passing, the National Pact guaranteed the president to be Maronite Christian due to the majority Christian population in Lebanon, however, due to the lack of checks on the president within the Lebanese constitution the decision to always have a Maronite president had much larger implications than were initially intended. The Lebanese Constitution leaves the presidential position unchecked by parliament, so an elected Maronite president would have complete executive authority. Additionally, the fear for many that the 1932 national census that led to the statistics ultimately resulting in a permanent Maronite Christian presidency may not have been entirely accurate due to inability to define Lebanese citizenship and the feared bias to maintain the status quo, also called the presidency into question. Many feared that the desire of the political elite to identify Lebanon as a primarily Christian nation led to inherent biases within the census and the ultimate decision to divide the government along the ratios that it did. This was reiterated by the idea that the Maronite Christians were the most closely aligned with the French mandate in Lebanon. So, some believed that the National Pact was put into place in order to maintain the same status quo as was held under the French mandate under the guise of promoting independence.

Some other controversy that surrounds the National Pact is that it was formulated through constitutional amendments, though much of the processes it stipulates and requirements are never actually detailed. For this reason, there is no written time limit on how long the stipulations within the National Pact should take place, even though the demographics of the Lebanese population may not always be with a Maronite Christian majority. Additionally, no processes were detailed describing the ways the governmental proportions should be enacted. In fact, the National Pact directly contradicts other aspects of the constitution stating that anyone can run for office solely on the basis of merit and competence, never once acknowledging religious affiliation.

== See also ==
- Politics of Lebanon
- Religion in Lebanon
- Reserved political positions
