= Taif Agreement =

1989 agreement intended to end the Lebanese Civil War

National Reconciliation Accord
- Type: Peace agreement
- Context: Ending the Lebanese Civil War
- Signed: October 22, 1989; 36 years ago
- Location: Taif, Saudi Arabia
- Effective: November 5, 1989; 36 years ago
- Mediators: Saudi Arabia; United States (discreetly)
- Parties: Lebanon; Syria; South Lebanon Army; Hezbollah; Other armed factions
- Language: Arabic

The 1989 Taif Agreement (Arabic: اتفاق الطائف, French: Accord de Taëf), officially known as the National Reconciliation Accord (وثيقة الوفاق الوطني), was reached to provide "the basis for the ending of the civil war and the return to political normalcy in Lebanon". Negotiated in Taif, Saudi Arabia, it was designed to end the 15 year-long Lebanese Civil War, and reassert the Lebanese government's authority in southern Lebanon, which was controlled at the time by the Christian-separatist South Lebanon Army under the occupational hegemony of Israel. Though the agreement set a time frame for withdrawal of Syrian military forces from Lebanon, stipulating that the Syrian occupation end within two years, Syria did not withdraw its forces from the country until 2005. It was signed on 22 October 1989 and ratified by the Lebanese parliament on 5 November 1989.

== Overview ==
The treaty was fathered by the Speaker of the Parliament Hussein El-Husseini and negotiated in Ta'if, Saudi Arabia, by the surviving members of Lebanon's 1972 parliament. The agreement came into effect with the active mediation of Saudi Arabia, discreet participation by the United States, and behind-the-scenes influence from Syria.

The agreement covered political reform, the ending of the Lebanese Civil War, the establishment of special relations between Lebanon and Syria, and a framework for the beginning of complete Syrian withdrawal from Lebanon. Since Rafik Hariri was a former Saudi diplomatic representative, he played a significant role in constructing the Taif Agreement. It is also argued that the Taif Accord reoriented Lebanon toward the Arab world, especially Syria. In other words, the Taif Accord positioned Lebanon as a country with "an Arab identity and belonging." The agreement was finalized and confirmed only after the development of an anti-Saddam Hussein international alliance. The alliance included Saudi Arabia, Egypt, Syria, France, Iran and the United States.

The agreement formed the principle of "mutual coexistence" (العيش المشترك) between Lebanon's different sects and their "proper political representation" (التمثيل السياسي الصحيح) as the main objective of post-civil war parliamentary electoral laws. It also restructured the National Pact political system in Lebanon by transferring some of the power away from the Maronite Christian community, which had been given a privileged status in Lebanon under the period of French rule. Prior to the agreement, the Sunni Muslim Prime Minister was appointed by and responsible to the Maronite President. After the Taif agreement the Prime Minister was responsible to the legislature, as in a traditional parliamentary system. Therefore, the agreement changed the power-sharing formula that had favoured the Christians to a 50:50 ratio and enhanced the powers of the Sunni Prime Minister over those of the Christian president. Prior to the Taif negotiations, a Maronite Christian, General Michel Aoun, had been appointed Prime Minister by President Amine Gemayel on 22 September 1988. This had caused a serious political crisis of a split premiership, as the post was reserved for a Sunni Muslim due to the National Pact of 1943, and Omar Karami held this office. The Taif agreement helped to overcome this crisis by preparing the election of a new president.

The agreement also provided for the disarmament of all national and non national militias. Hezbollah was allowed to stay armed in its capacity as a "resistance force" rather than a militia, fighting Israel in the south, a privilege obtained – according to the Swedish academic Magnus Ranstorp – in part by using its leverage as holder of a number of Western hostages.

Although the Taif Agreement identified the abolition of political sectarianism as a national priority, it provided no timeframe for doing so. The Chamber of Deputies was increased in size to 128 members, shared equally between Christians and Muslims, rather than elected by universal suffrage that would have provided a Muslim majority (excluding the expatriate community, a majority of which is Christian). A cabinet was established similarly divided equally between Christians and Muslims.

According to As'ad AbuKhalil, the agreement greatly diminished the power of the President to the benefit of the Council of Ministers, although there is ongoing debate about whether this power has shifted to the Council as a whole or the Prime Minister. The president, having had significant executive power prior to the agreement, was reduced to a figurehead with no real and/or considerable power, as in most parliamentary republics. He also noted that the agreement extended the term of the Speaker of the Lebanese Parliament from one year to four years, although the position "remains largely without meaningful authority".

The agreement was ratified on 5 November 1989. The Parliament met on the same day at the Qoleiat air base in North Lebanon and elected President René Moawad, 409 days after Amine Gemayel vacated this position upon the expiration of his term in 1988. Moawad was unable to occupy the Presidential Palace which was still in use by General Michel Aoun. Moawad was assassinated seventeen days later in a car bombing in Beirut on 22 November 1989 as his motorcade returned from Lebanese Independence Day ceremonies. He was succeeded by Elias Hrawi, who remained in office until 1998.

The Taif Agreement largely focused on addressing sectarian representation. Simultaneously, omitting topics connected to issues such as economics, gender and ideology, which were also center in the Lebanese civil war.

== Political reform ==
The agreement contained multiple constitutional amendments, which came into force following President Hrawi's signature in September 1990. Among the most major changes:

- The ratio of Christians to Muslims in Parliament was reduced from 6:5 to 1:1.
- The term duration of the Speaker of the House was increased from one year to four years. (Article 44 of the constitution)
- Article 17 of the constitution was amended from "the executive power is vested in the President of the Republic, who exercises with the assistance of his ministers" to "the executive power is vested in the Council of Ministers, who exercise it according to the dispositions of this constitution".
- Presidential prerogatives were somewhat curtailed. Among the powers lost were:
  - Require parliamentary consultations before nominating the Prime Minister.
  - Cannot dismiss or appoint individual ministers at will (requires approval of the Council).
  - Introduce laws in Parliament. Instead, he introduces them to the Cabinet, who then vote to transmit it to Parliament.
  - Nominate or dismiss state employees, which became the Council's duty. In reality, this had little impact in political life as civil servants were generally nominated by ministers and then voted on in cabinet, before being appointed by the President.
- "The Chamber of Deputies [...] shall take the appropriate measures to bring about the abolition of political confessionalism according to a transitional plan." (Article 95 of the constitution)

== Disarmament of militias ==
Hrawi’s government set 30 April 1991 as the final date imposing the surrender of all territory, heavy artillery, and disbandment of militias.

=== Jbeil-Keserwan ===
The LF had already agreed to hand over the Keserwan and Jbeil districts in April 1990 to the LAF under General Elie Hayek (Mount Lebanon commander), with the condition that its 10,000 men strong force remain intact.

=== Metn-Baabda ===
In 1989/90 the Metn and Baabda areas, which had been the heartland of the Phalange Party and the LF since the 1950s, experienced unprecedented fighting and shelling following Michel Aoun’s offensives against Samir Geagea’s LF. On 13 October 1990, during the Syrian assault on Baabda Palace, Aoun escaped to the French embassy. The LAF under General Elie Hayek began moving South from Kisrawan and East from Beirut into the Metn and Baabda. Following the battle for the Presidential Palace in which 150 of their soldiers were killed the Syrian army executed up to 80 of the defenders. Atrocities also occurred in the Metn where the SSNP and Hobeika’s LF were at the forefront of the Syrian operations.

=== East/West Beirut ===
Following the end of the Elimination War on 13 October 1990, LAF soldiers began dismantling militia positions on the Green Line. Soon after, barrages and checkpoints blocking access between the cantons were dismantled, allowing traffic to move freely between the East and West for the first time since 1976. In addition, the LAF moved into Martyrs’ Square, which had been the site of some of the most intense fighting in the entire Civil War. On 3 December 1990 Samir Geagea’s LF officially withdrew from East Beirut with a 2,000 man parade featuring hundreds of vehicles, including tanks and artillery. They also stripped Beirut port of all its equipment including cranes and tugboats.

A few years later, the company Solidere would be mandated by the government to rebuild the completely destroyed downtown.

=== Aley-Chouf ===
The LAF had not been present in the Chouf and most parts of Aley since 1975 when fighting first broke out; in addition, the area was devoid of Christians following the mountain war. On 30 April 1991, the final date of militia disbandment, the Lebanese Army under the command of Hayek entered the Aley and Chouf districts, taking position at former PLA checkpoints and seizing all artillery material. The Chouf Mountains were the last areas of Mount Lebanon that the LAF moved into. Slowly after, Christians began returning to their homeland in these territories, but it was not until the Mountain Reconciliation in 2001 that the mass return of Christians was finalized.

=== North (LF-held) ===
Up until the 30 April 1991, all LF apparatus and positions were integrated into the national army. The army entered the districts of Bcharre (LF/Maronite heartland) to take command of any remaining positions, although there was no animosity or historic entrance as two presidents during the war (Bachir and Amine Gemayel) had been Phalangists, therefore army/LF cooperation had been an everyday affair.

=== North (Syrian-held) ===
Most Syrian troops withdrew from Akkar and Tripoli in the two years following Hrawi's signature of the Accord to Tartous governorate in Syria or the Beqaa Valley in Lebanon (as there was no time limit on their presence in the Beqaa).

=== South ===
From 7 February 1991, the Lebanese army began deploying in villages next to the Israeli ‘security zone’. On 15 February Fatah fighters crushed a revolt by a group of their own members who refused to leave their positions in one of the villages. 10 people were killed in the fighting.

On 4 July 1991, following the failure of disarmament negotiations, as required by the Taif agreement, the Lebanese Army attacked Palestinian positions in Southern Lebanon. The offensive, involving 10,000 troops against an estimated 5,000 militia, lasted 3 days and ended with the Army taking all the Palestinian positions around Sidon. In the agreement that followed all heavy weapons were surrendered and infantry weapons only allowed in the two refugee camps, Ain al-Hilweh and Mieh Mieh. 73 people were killed in the fighting, and 200 wounded, mostly Palestinian.

As the South was occupied by Israel and the South Lebanon Army (SLA) militia, the army was not deployed there until the year 2000, when Israel and the SLA retreated South of the Blue Line. As a result of the occupation in 1989, the Taif Agreement enabled "resistance" groups to remain armed in the South until Israeli withdrawal (principally Hezbollah).

The LAF entered the South in 2000 for the first time since 1976 – 24 years after it retreated following the Palestinian insurgency in South Lebanon. Despite the IDF withdrawal in 2000, Hezbollah did not disarm - with approval from President Lahoud and Syria - because 40Km^{2} of the 10,452km^{2} remained occupied in the Shebaa farms, in agreement with international law, the resistance was allowed to keep its arms on guard, while waiting for a unified defense strategy and diplomacy to liberate the remaining 40km2.

=== Beqaa Valley ===
The agreement stipulated the withdrawal of all Syrian troops to the Beqaa valley by 2 years at most, but did not provide a time frame for their full withdrawal of the country. This loophole enabled the Syrian Arab Army to occupy the Beqaa for the next 15 years and dominate political life for the same period, until its complete retreat in March 2005 following the Cedar Revolution and UN Resolution 1559.

== See also ==
- Doha Agreement of 2008
- History of Lebanon
- UN Security Council Resolution 1559
- 2017 Lebanon–Saudi Arabia dispute
- Confessionalism
- National Pact
- Disarmament of Hezbollah
