= Confessionalism (politics) =

System of government that is a de jure mix of religion and politics

Confessionalism is a system of government that is a de jure mix of religion and politics. It typically entails the distribution of political and institutional power proportionally among confessional communities.

== Governmental structure ==
Some countries' political systems distribute power across the major religions in the country. This can be required by the constitution or through unwritten tradition.

The repartition of assembly seats on a confessional basis in the Middle East was invented by the Ottoman Empire (e.g. in the Ottoman Parliament) and continued in several post-Ottoman countries with reserved seats for non-Muslim minorities, namely Christian (Jordan and Iraq), or for all religious communities including Muslim subgroups and Christian churches (Lebanon). A similar system prevails in Iran for the Armenian, Assyrian, Jewish and Zoroastrian minorities.

In the politics of Iraq, following the invasion of Iraq in 2003, the occupying administration introduced a system where power was shared between the three main ethno-religious groups: Shia Muslim Arabs, Sunni Muslim Arabs and Kurds. The constitution of Iraq encouraged such power-sharing, due to the parliamentary system and the initial requirement for a super-majority to elect the president. Although not explicitly required in the constitution, political tradition has continued to date for the president to be a Kurd, the speaker of Parliament a Sunni Muslim Arab and the prime minister a Shi'ite Muslim Arab.

In Lebanon, the concept of confessionalism holds an important political meaning, since political power and government institutions are organized according to religious confessions (as it happened in Switzerland, Germany, the Netherlands and other countries before). For example, the National Pact (an unwritten covenant) and later the Taif Agreement provide for a Maronite Christian president, a Sunni Muslim prime minister, and a Shia Muslim speaker of parliament.

Although the system was meant to be a temporary solution "until such time as the Chamber enacts new electoral laws on a non-confessional basis", more than 80 years later, it remains the system of government. All posts in government and seats in the legislature are apportioned amongst different religious groups according to a political agreement, as the relative demographic weight of those groups is unknown. The constitution of 1926, amended after the Taif Agreement of 1990 and the Doha agreement of 2008 specified that there should be 54 Christian deputies and 54 Muslim deputies, even though in practice there are 64 deputies each. In addition, within those two groups, seats should be shared according to the demographic weight of each community.

The Lebanese constitution also guarantees segmental autonomy to 18 recognized communities in the country in domains such as education. Lebanon also presents other characteristics of confessionalism. Since 2005 Lebanese politics has been polarized around two trans-religious coalitions with the majority never able to govern alone. There is, however, another section of the constitution that addresses the development of outside parties not represented by popular support.

== Political parties ==
In some countries there are political parties whose main ideology is based on a religion, such as Christian democratic parties and Islamic political parties.

In the politics of the Netherlands the term "confessionalism" refers to any political ideology based on religion. A traditional norm in society, extending to many facets of cultural life, termed pillarisation. Dutch parties usually labelled as confessionalist are the Christian Union and the Reformed Political Party, both exclusively Protestant.

Political parties with religious ideology are sometimes banned on the grounds of promoting violence and hatred (e.g. Vlaams Blok and Batasuna), altering the national character, or having outside support.

In some cases bans are written into the constitution. Bulgaria’s Constitution prohibits religious political parties. The Constitution of Turkey states the country is secular, and the constitutional court ruled that the Islamist Virtue Party was unconstitutional. The political parties in Portugal are forbidden from using a name that has religious connotation, although the parties are still allowed to adopt a religious ideology, thus allowing the formation of CDS – People's Party.

== Multiconfessionalism ==
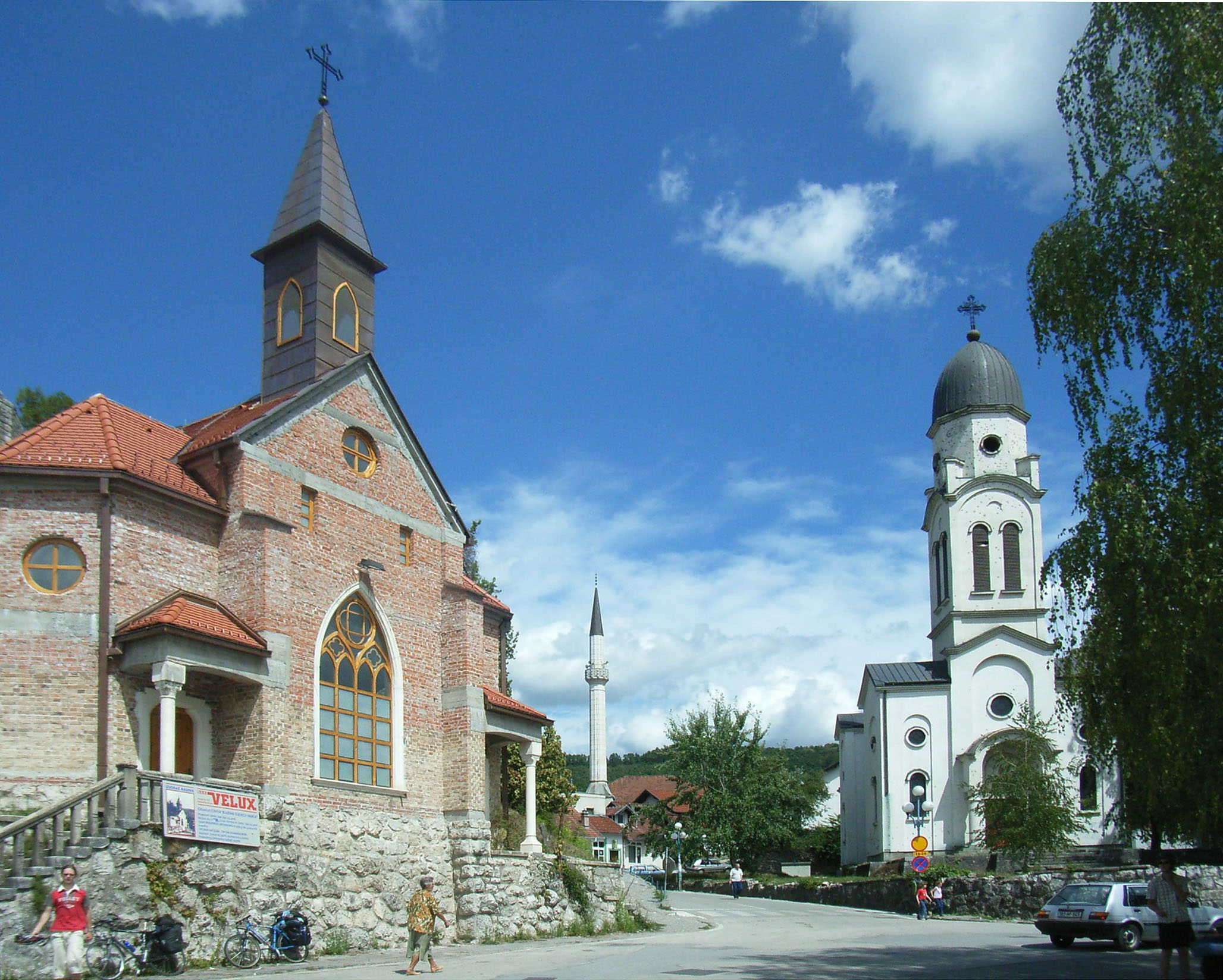
Catholic church, mosque and Serbian Orthodox church in Bosanska Krupa, Bosnia and Herzegovina.

Multiconfessional countries have a power sharing arrangement between people of different faiths, usually three or more significant confessional groups within the same jurisdiction. Examples of modern countries deemed multiconfessional are Lebanon and Bosnia and Herzegovina.

The "National Pact" in Lebanon is a formal agreement altering the 1926 Constitution, which laid the foundation of Lebanon as a confessionalist state. Instead of a minority wielding the most power, political power became more representative.

The 3 dominant religions of Bosnia and Herzegovina (Islam, Eastern Orthodox Church, Roman Catholic Church) are practiced by the three native ethnic groups of the country: Bosniaks, Bosnian Serbs and Bosnian Croats respectively. Religious nationalism that emerged as part of the breakup of Yugoslavia would later cause the Bosnian War.

== See also ==
- Religions by country
- Multiculturalism
- Religious pluralism
- Consociationalism
- Secularism
- Laïcité
