= Religion in Lebanon =

Religion in Lebanon (2023)
1. Shiism (32.2%)
2. Sunnism (31.2%)
3. Alawism and Ismailism (0.60%)
4. Maronite Catholics (16.0%)
5. Greek Orthodoxy (7.62%)
6. Other Christians (6.86%)
7. Druze (5.50%)
Religion in Lebanon (Pew Research Center 2020)
1. Islam (67.8%)
2. Christianity (27.9%)
3. Other religions (4.30%)

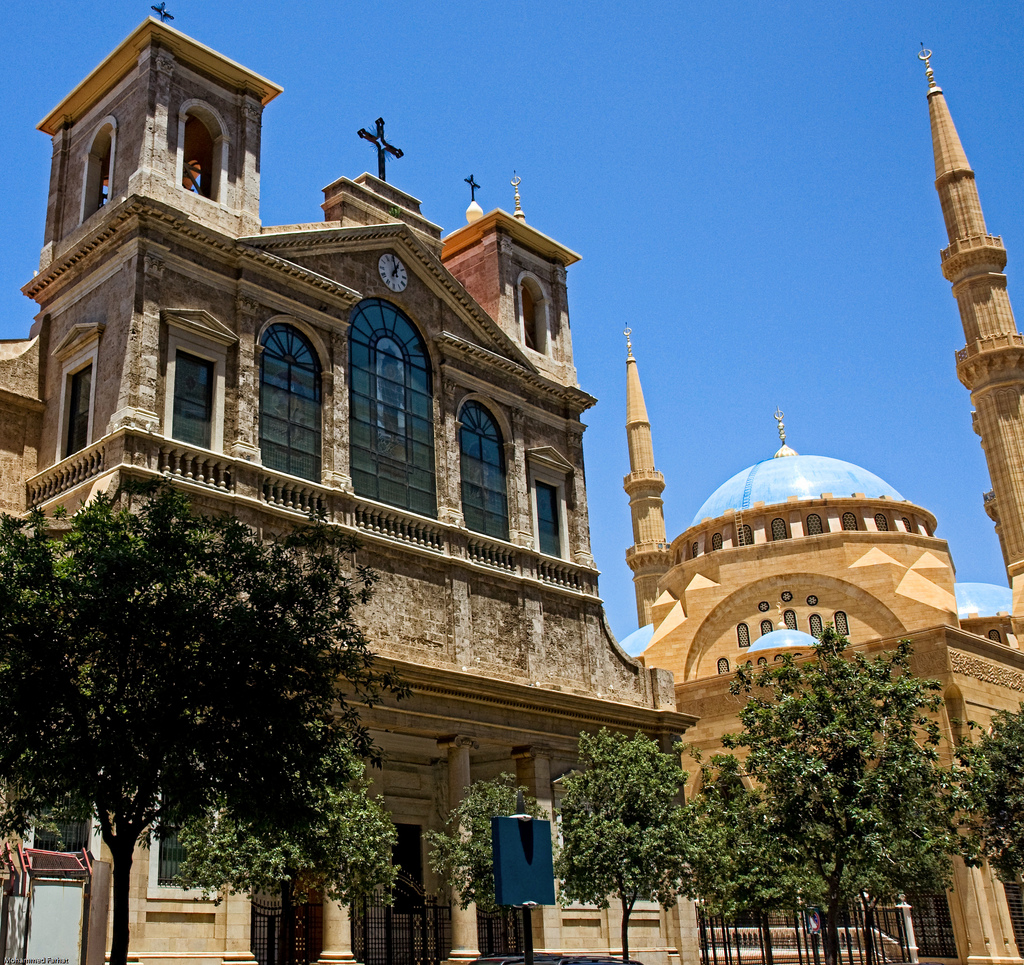
Saint George Maronite Cathedral and the Mohammad Al-Amin Mosque in the capital Beirut.

Religion in Lebanon is characterized by a diversity of religious beliefs and practices. The main religious groups in the country are Shia Muslims, Sunni Muslims, Roman Catholic Christians (Maronites, Melkites, etc.), Greek Orthodox Christians and Druze.

Lebanon officially recognizes 18 religious communities or sects: Islam (Sunni, Shia, Alawites, and Isma'ili), Druze, Christianity (the Maronite Church, the Greek Orthodox Church, the Melkite Greek Catholic Church, evangelical Protestantism, the Armenian Apostolic Church, the Armenian Catholic Church, the Latin Church, the Syriac Catholic Church, the Syriac Orthodox Church, the Assyrian Church of the East, the Chaldean Catholic Church, the Coptic Orthodox Church) and Judaism.

Statistics quoted in 2023 indicate that 32.2% are Shia, 31.2% are Sunni, 16.0% are Maronite, 7.6% are Greek Orthodox, 5.5% are Druze. The rest belong to other smaller Muslim and Christian denominations. Besides Lebanese citizens in Lebanon, a large proportion of the country's population are displaced refugees, accounting for 2 million out of 6 million in 2024. The refugees, who are mostly of Syrian or Palestinian origin, are predominantly Sunni Muslims, but include Christians and Shia Muslims. Lebanon differs from other Middle East countries in that Muslims have become the majority more recently, after the Lebanese Civil War. Christians were once a majority inside Lebanon and are still an overwhelming majority in the Lebanese diaspora, which consists of nearly 14 million people.

Under the National Pact, the president of Lebanon must be a Maronite Christian, the prime minister a Sunni Muslim, and the speaker of parliament a Shia Muslim.

== Population by religious affiliation ==
=== 1895 estimate and 1913 census in Mount Lebanon ===
Current religious groups in Lebanon, with the boundaries of Mount Lebanon marked with a dotted line.

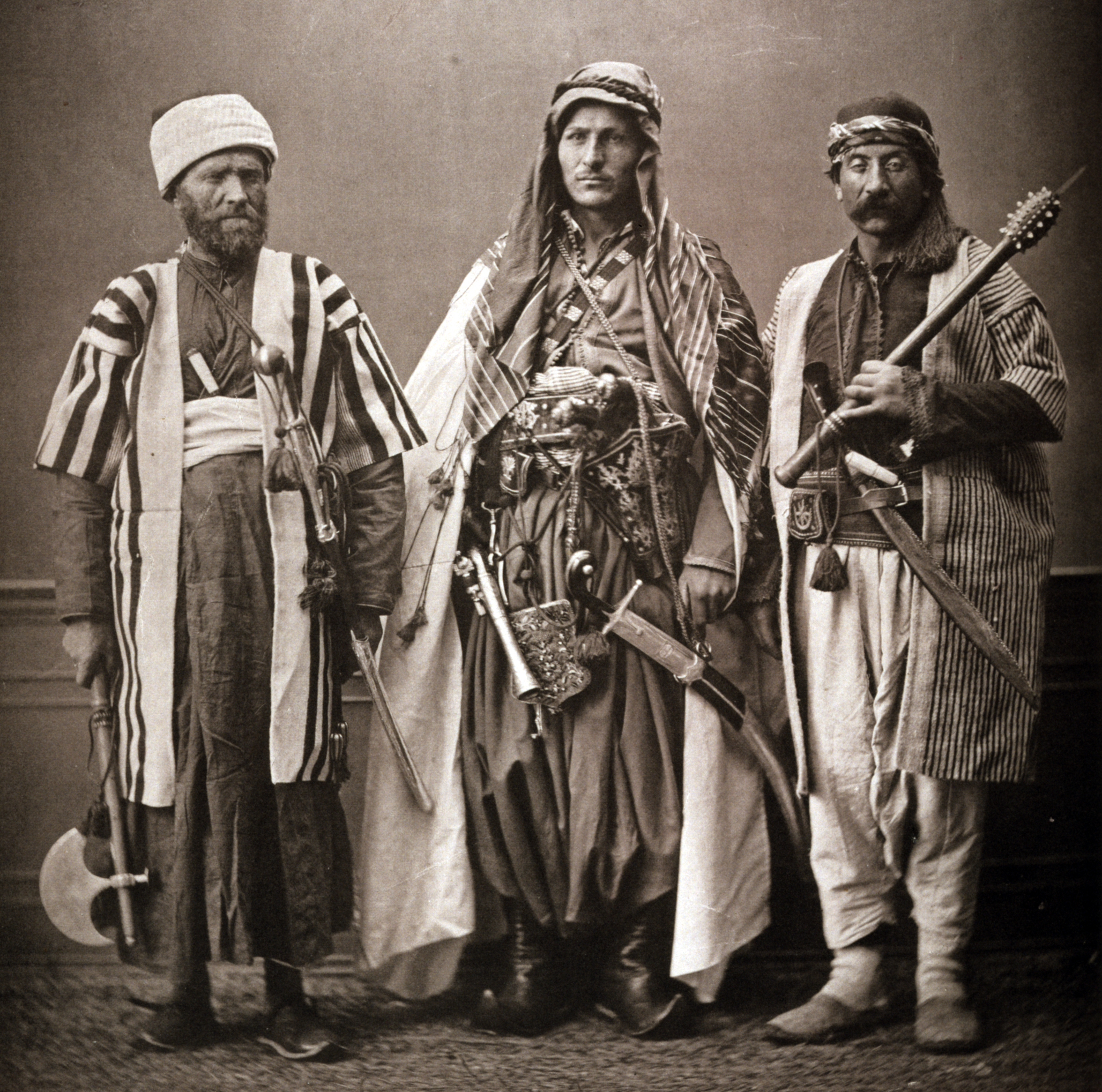
Two Lebanese Christians from Zahlé and Zgharta, and one Druze from Chouf in 1873.

An estimate and census were made in Mount Lebanon during Ottoman rule, the main Christian-majority territory in present-day Lebanon. These were after the 1860 civil conflict in Mount Lebanon and Damascus but before the Great Famine of Mount Lebanon during World War I, which caused the death of about 200,000 people, half the population.

Religion in Mount Lebanon according to official estimates and censuses
| Religion | | 1895 estimate | | 1913 census | |
| Religion | | # | % | # | % |
Christians
| Roman Catholic | Maronite | 229,680 | 57.49% | 242,308 | 58.42% |
| Roman Catholic | Melkite | 34,472 | 8.63% | 31,936 | 7.70% |
| Roman Catholic | Total | 264,152 | 66.12% | 274,244 | 66.12% |
| Greek Orthodox | | 54,208 | 13.57% | 52,356 | 12.62% |
| Other Christians | | 936 | 0.23% | 2,882 | 0.69% |
| Total Christians | | 319,296 | 79.92% | 329,482 | 79.44% |
Druze
| Druze | | 49,812 | 12.47% | 47,290 | 11.40% |
Muslims
| Shiite | | 16,846 | 4.22% | 23,413 | 5.65% |
| Sunni | | 13,576 | 3.40% | 14,529 | 3.50% |
| Total Muslims | | 30,422 | 7.61% | 37,942 | 9.15% |
| Total population | | 399,530 | 100% | 414,747 | 100% |

=== Censuses of 1922 and 1932 ===
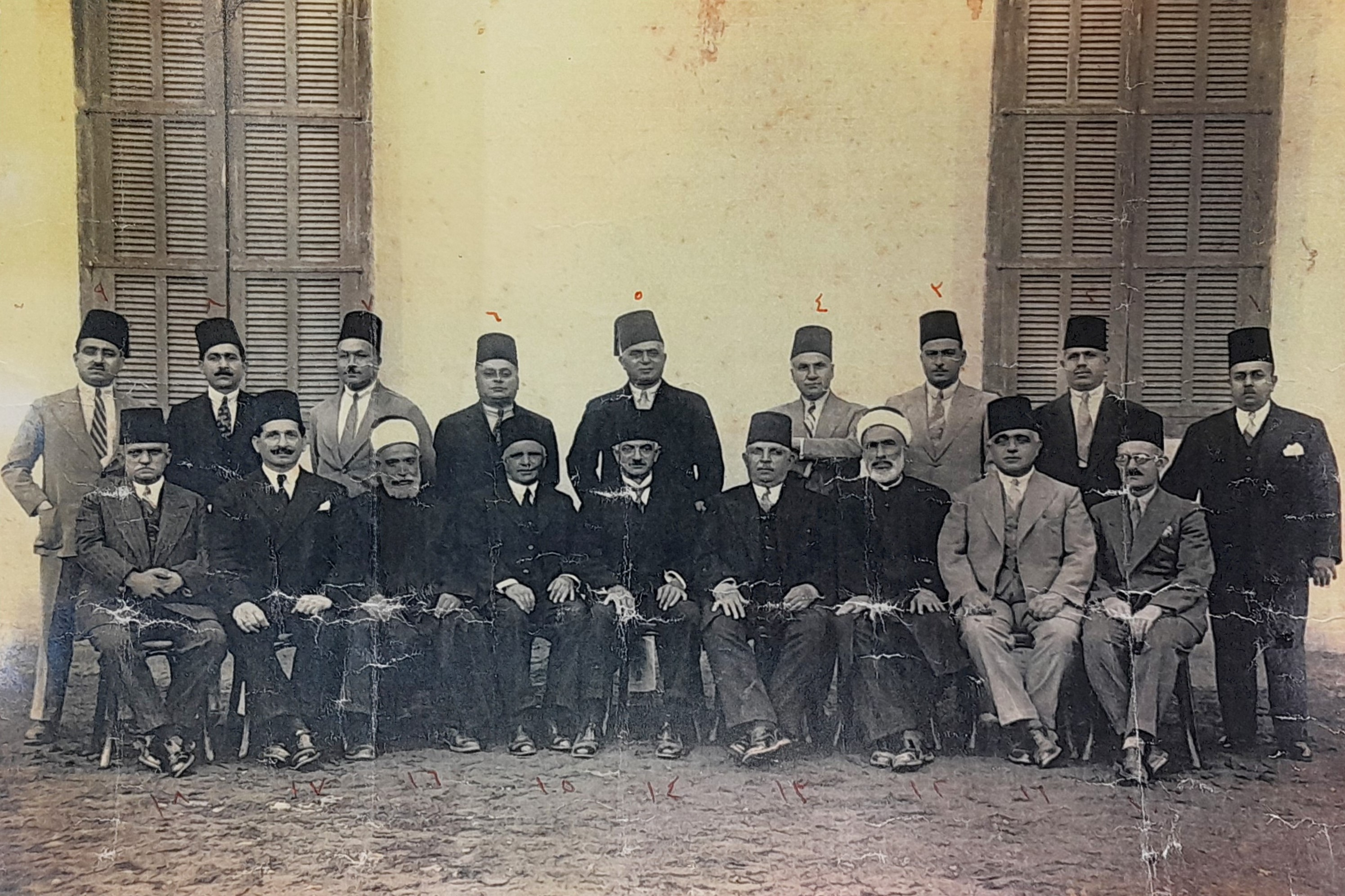
Members of the Al-Makassed Islamic Philanthropic Association in Serail Hill, Beirut in 1926.

No official census has been taken since 1932, reflecting the political sensitivity in Lebanon over confessional (i.e., religious) balance. As a result, the religious affiliation of the Lebanese population is very difficult to establish with certainty and various sources are used to get the possible estimate of the population by religious affiliation.

Religion in Lebanon according to censuses
| Religion | | 1922 census | | 1932 census | |
| Religion | | # | % | # | % |
Christians
| Roman Catholic | Maronite | 199,182 | 31.66% | 226,378 | 28.82% |
| Roman Catholic | Melkite | 42,426 | 6.74% | 45,999 | 5.86% |
| Roman Catholic | Armenian | | 0.00% | 5,964 | 0.76% |
| Roman Catholic | Syriac | 12,651 | 2.01% | 2,675 | 0.34% |
| Roman Catholic | Latin | | 0.00% | | 0.00% |
| Roman Catholic | Chaldean | | 0.00% | 528 | 0.07% |
| Roman Catholic | Total | 254,259 | 40.42% | 281,544 | 35.84% |
| Greek Orthodox | | 81,409 | 12.94% | 76,522 | 9.74% |
| Armenian Apostolic | | | 0.00% | 25,462 | 3.24% |
| Protestant | | | 0.00% | 6,712 | 0.85% |
| Syriac Orthodox | | | 0.00% | 2,574 | 0.33% |
| Total Christians | | 355,668 | 56.54% | 392,544 | 49.97% |
Muslims
| Sunni | | 124,786 | 19.84% | 175,925 | 22.40% |
| Shiite | | 104,947 | 16.68% | 154,208 | 19.63% |
| Total Muslims | | 229,733 | 36.52% | 330,133 | 42.03% |
Druze
| Druze | | 43,633 | 6.94% | 53,047 | 6.75% |
Others
| Jews, Baháʼí, etc. | | | 0.00% | 9,819 | 1.25% |
| Total population | | 629,034 | 100% | 785,543 | 100% |

=== Official estimates of 1943, 1951 and 1956 ===
These estimates were made before the arrival of thousands of Palestinian and Syrian refugees, the Lebanese civil war, and the Hezbollah-Israel conflict, so Lebanon's demographics have changed drastically since then.

Religion in Lebanon according to official estimates
| Religion | | 1943 estimate | | 1951 estimate | | 1956 estimate | |
| Religion | | # | % | # | % | # | % |
Christians
| Roman Catholic | Maronite | 318,201 | 30.41% | 377,544 | 29.41% | 423,708 | 30.10% |
| Roman Catholic | Melkite | 61,956 | 5.92% | 81,764 | 6.37% | 87,788 | 6.24% |
| Roman Catholic | Armenian | | 0.00% | 14,218 | 1.11% | 14,622 | 1.04% |
| Roman Catholic | Syriac | | 0.00% | 5,911 | 0.46% | 5,699 | 0.40% |
| Roman Catholic | Latin | | 0.00% | 4,127 | 0.32% | 4,506 | 0.32% |
| Roman Catholic | Chaldean | | 0.00% | 1,390 | 0.11% | 1,466 | 0.10% |
| Roman Catholic | Total | 380,157 | 36.33% | 484,954 | 37.77% | 537,789 | 38.20% |
| Greek Orthodox | | 106,658 | 10.19% | 130,858 | 10.19% | 148,927 | 10.58% |
| Armenian Apostolic | | 58,007 | 5.54% | 67,139 | 5.23% | 63,679 | 4.52% |
| Protestant | | | 0.00% | 12,641 | 0.98% | 14,365 | 1.02% |
| Syriac Orthodox | | | 0.00% | 4,562 | 0.36% | 4,798 | 0.34% |
| Total Christians | | 544,822 | 52.07% | 700,154 | 54.53% | 769,558 | 54.66% |
Muslims
| Sunni | | 222,594 | 21.27% | 271,734 | 21.16% | 285,698 | 20.29% |
| Shiite | | 200,698 | 19.18% | 237,107 | 18.47% | 250,605 | 17.80% |
| Total Muslims | | 423,292 | 40.45% | 508,841 | 39.63% | 536,303 | 38.09% |
Druze
| Druze | | 71,711 | 6.85% | 62,268 | 4.85% | 88,131 | 6.26% |
Others
| Jews, Baháʼí, etc. | | 6,596 | 0.63% | 12,677 | 0.99% | 13,876 | 0.99% |
| Total population | | 1,046,421 | 100% | 1,283,940 | 100% | 1,407,868 | 100% |

=== Recent estimates ===
In 2023, the United States Department of State cited a study conducted by Statistics Lebanon, a Beirut-based research firm, estimating Lebanon's population to be 69.3% Muslim (32.2% Shia; 31.2% Sunni; 5.5% Druze; 0.6% Alawites and Ismailis combined) and 30.5% Christian. 52.5% of Christians are Maronite and 25% Greek Orthodox, and other Christian groups include Greek Catholics (Melkites), Armenian Orthodox, Armenian Catholics, Syriac Orthodox, Syriac Catholics, Assyrians, Chaldean Catholics, Copts, Protestants (including Presbyterians, Baptists, and Seventh-day Adventists), Roman (Latin) Catholics, and members of the Church of Jesus Christ.

According to Pew Research Center data from 2020, 67.8% of Lebanon's population was Muslim, and 27.9% of the population was Christian. Pew reported that the Muslim percentage increased at least 5 percentage points between 2010 and 2020. In a report from 2009, Pew estimated the number of Shia Muslims at 45-55% of all Lebanese muslims.

Lebanon has small community of Hindus estimated in 2020 to be less than 10,000. There is a very small and ancient community of Zoroastrians, numbering between 100 and 500 individuals. Lebanon has a Jewish population estimated at less than 100.

Lebanon's complex socio-political environment and history of conflict have heavily influenced these trends, with shifts in population numbers reflecting broader regional upheavals, such as the Syrian civil war, the Lebanese-Israeli conflicts, and internal economic and political struggles.

=== Graphical trend based on official data (1895–1956) ===
Religion in Mount Lebanon (1895 estimate)
1. Christianity (79.9%)
2. Druze (12.5%)
3. Islam (7.61%)
Religion in Mount Lebanon (1913 census)
1. Christianity (79.4%)
2. Druze (11.4%)
3. Islam (9.15%)
Religion in Lebanon (1922 census)
1. Christianity (56.5%)
2. Islam (36.5%)
3. Druze (6.94%)
Religion in Lebanon (1932 census)
1. Christianity (50.0%)
2. Islam (42.0%)
3. Druze (6.75%)
4. Other religions (1.25%)
Religion in Lebanon (1943 estimate)
1. Christianity (52.1%)
2. Islam (40.5%)
3. Druze (6.85%)
4. Other religions (0.63%)
Religion in Lebanon (1951 estimate)
1. Christianity (54.5%)
2. Islam (39.6%)
3. Druze (4.85%)
4. Other religions (0.99%)
Religion in Lebanon (1956 estimate)
1. Christianity (54.7%)
2. Islam (38.1%)
3. Druze (6.26%)
4. Other religions (0.99%)

== Geographical distribution of religion in Lebanon ==
=== Christians and Druze ===
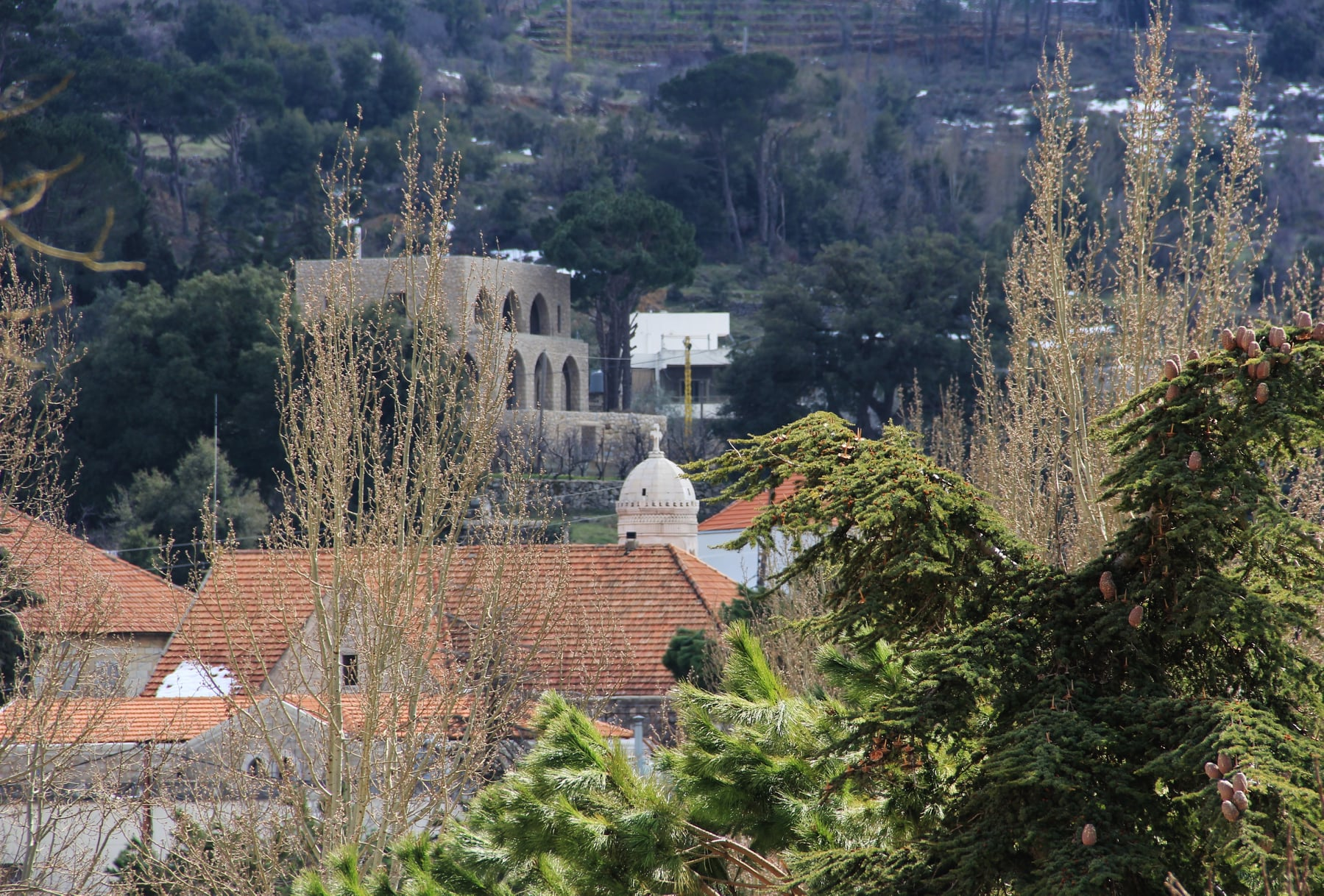
A Christian Church and a Druze Khalwa in the Shuf Mountains.

Historically, the Druzes and the Christians in the Shuf Mountains have lived together in complete harmony since the 1860 Christian–Druze war. The Druzite and Maronite community in Lebanon played an important role in the formation of the modern state of Lebanon. Contact between Christians (members of the Maronite, Eastern Orthodox, Melkite, and other churches) and the Unitarian Druze led to the presence of mixed villages and towns in Mount Lebanon (Aley District, Baabda District, and Chouf District), Rashaya District, Hasbaya, Matn District, and Marjeyoun District.

==== Christians ====
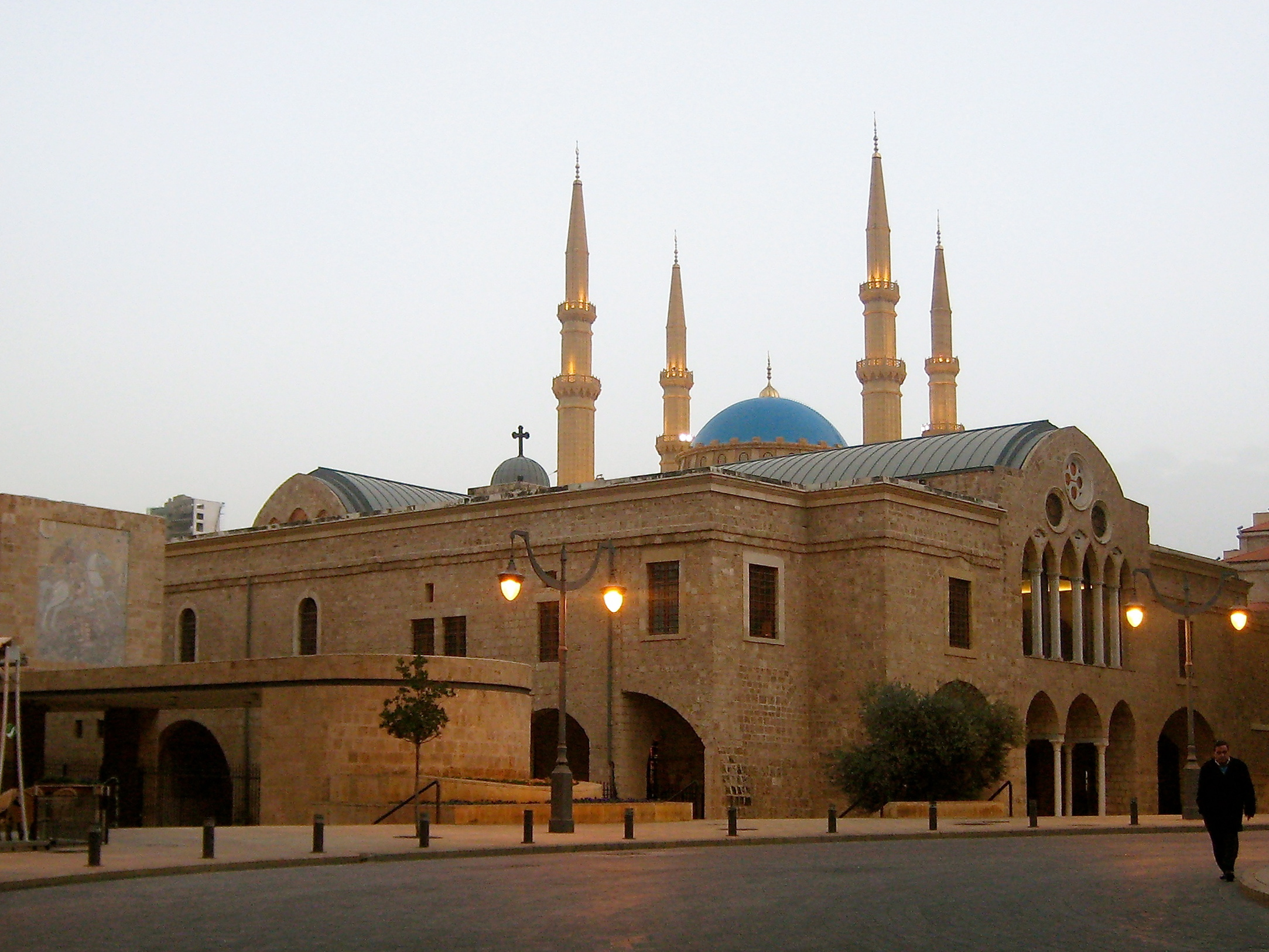
View of the Saint George Greek Orthodox Cathedral in Beirut.

Lebanese Christians form a large proportion of the total population, and they are divided into many branches, including Maronite, Eastern Orthodox, Melkite, and other communities. Lebanon used to be a Christian majority country a few decades back, making up over 60% of the population.

Lebanese Maronite Catholics are concentrated in the northern parts of Greater Beirut, the northern part of Mount Lebanon Governorate, the southern part of North Governorate, parts of Beqaa Governorate and South Governorate.

Lebanese Greek Orthodox are concentrated in north Beirut, as well as Lebanese North areas including Zgharta, Bsharri, Koura, and Batroun.

Lebanese Greek Catholics are found across the country but in particular in districts on the eastern slopes of the Lebanese mountain range and in Zahlé, where they are a majority. They are also, along with the Maronites, the main group in Jezzine.

Lebanese Protestants are concentrated mainly within the area of Beirut and Greater Beirut.

The other Lebanese Christians and non-native Christian communities are concentrated in similar areas like in east Beirut (northern parts of Greater Beirut), Mount Lebanon, North, Zahlé, and Jezzine.

Distribution of Christians in Lebanon by municipality

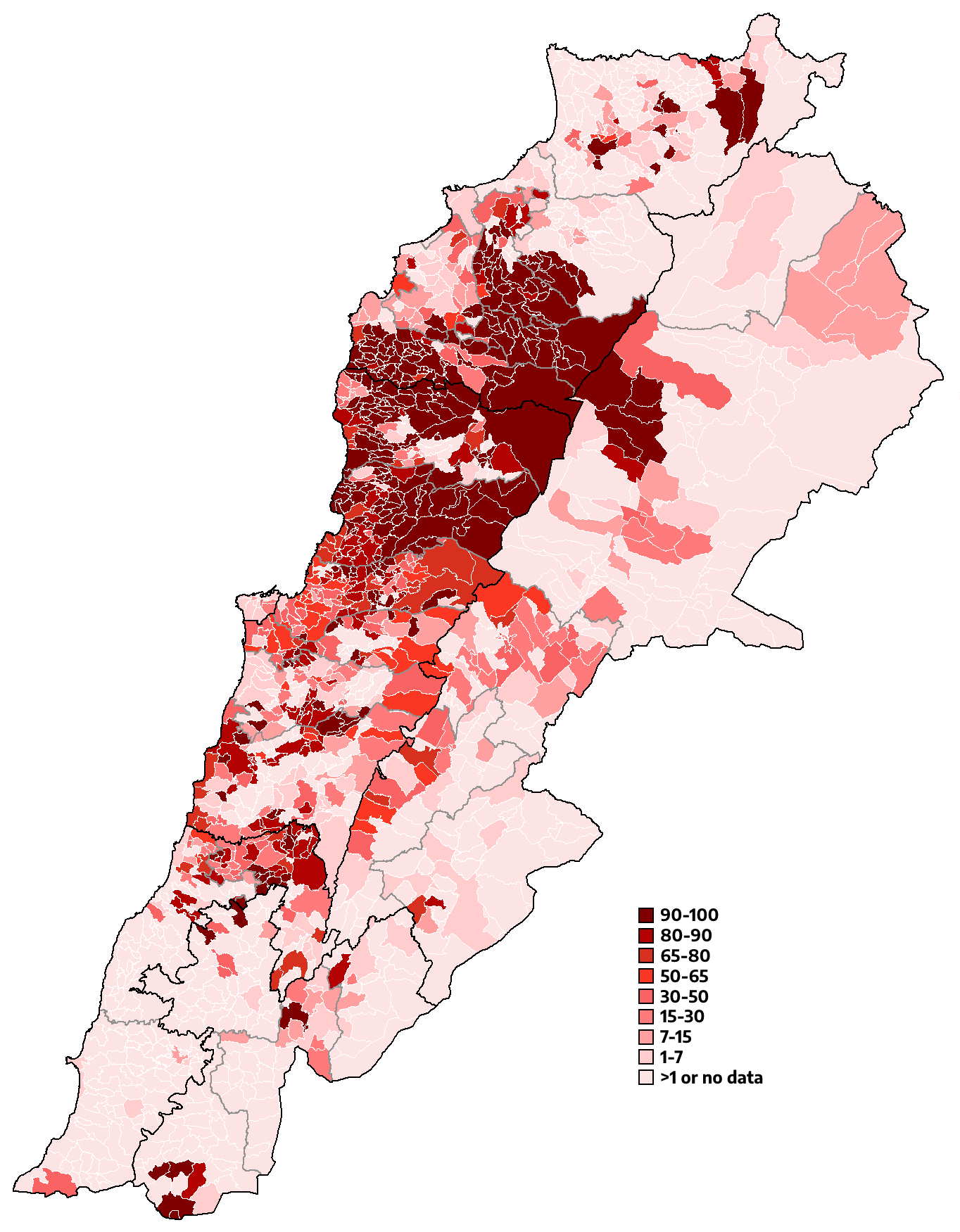
Maronite Catholic Christians

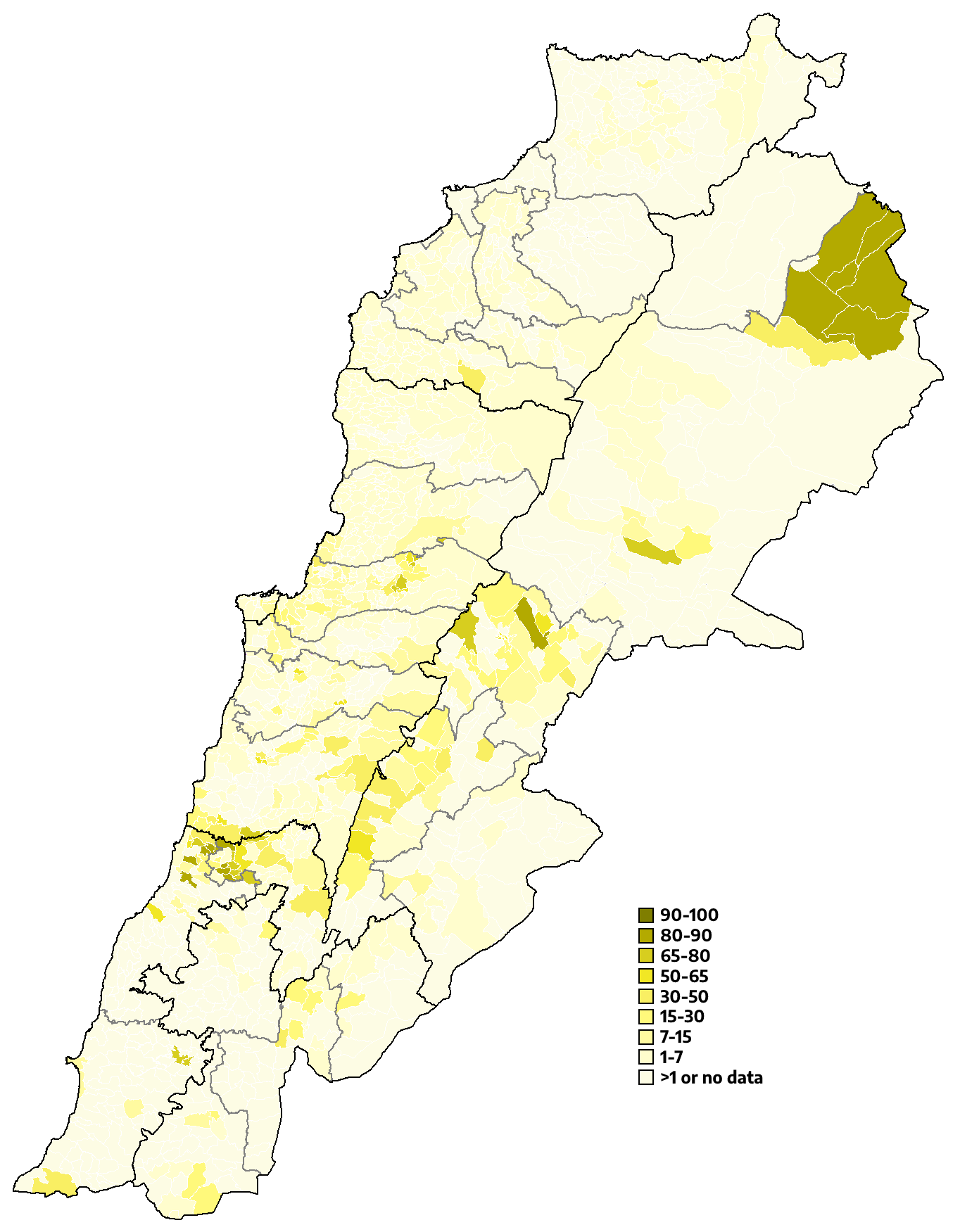
Melkite Catholic Christians

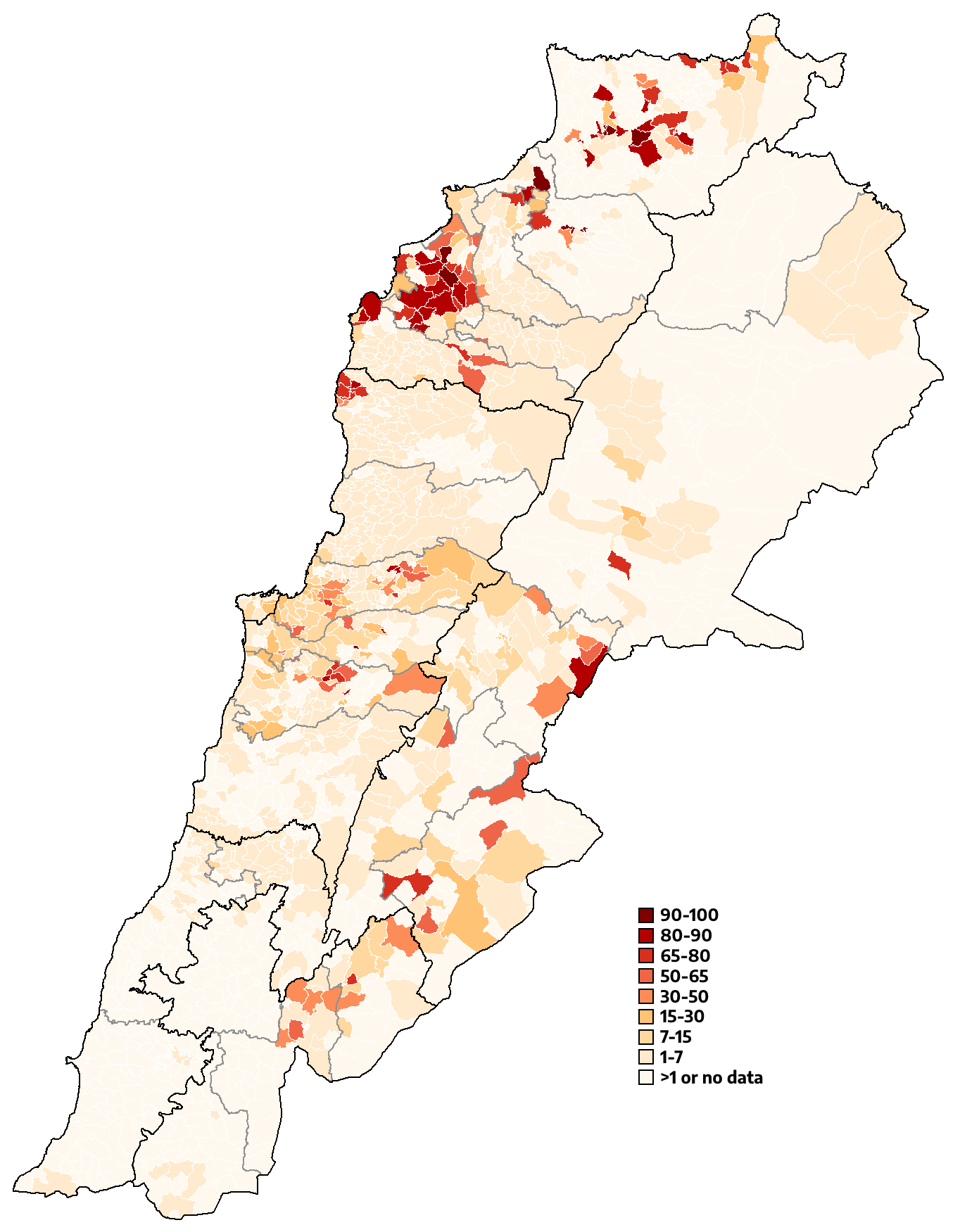
Greek Orthodox Christians

==== Druze ====
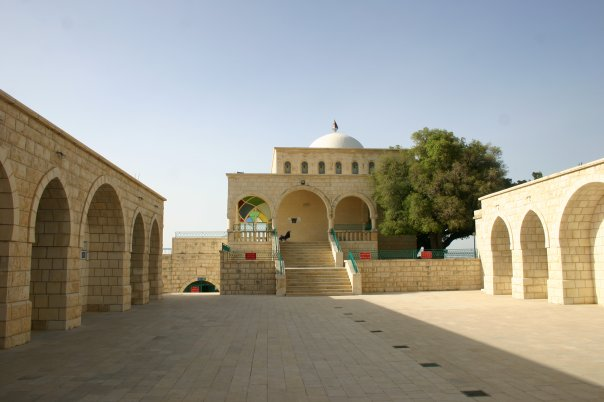
Prophet Job shrine in Niha village, Mount Lebanon.

The Druze are concentrated in the rural, mountainous areas east and south of Beirut. The Lebanese Druze are estimated to constitute 5.2 percent of Lebanon's population. They live in 136 villages in Hasbaya, Rashaya, Chouf, Aley, Marjeyoun and Beirut, and they constitute the majority of the population Aley, Baakleen, Hasbaya and Rashaya. The Druze make up more than half of the population of the Aley District, and they constitute about a third of the residents of the Rachaya District, and they constitute about the quarter of residents of the Chouf District and the Matn District.

Distribution of Druze in Lebanon by municipality

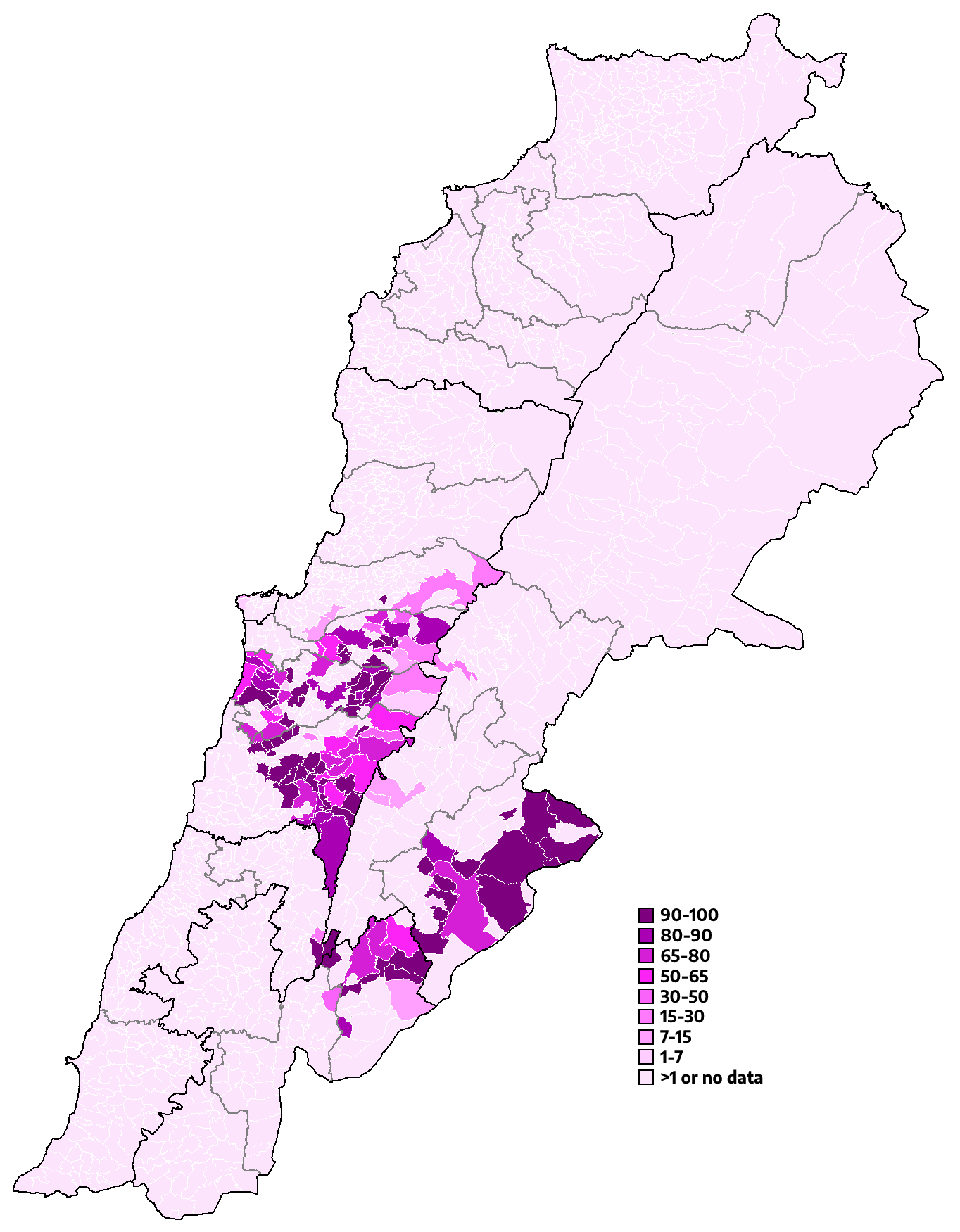
Druze

=== Muslims ===
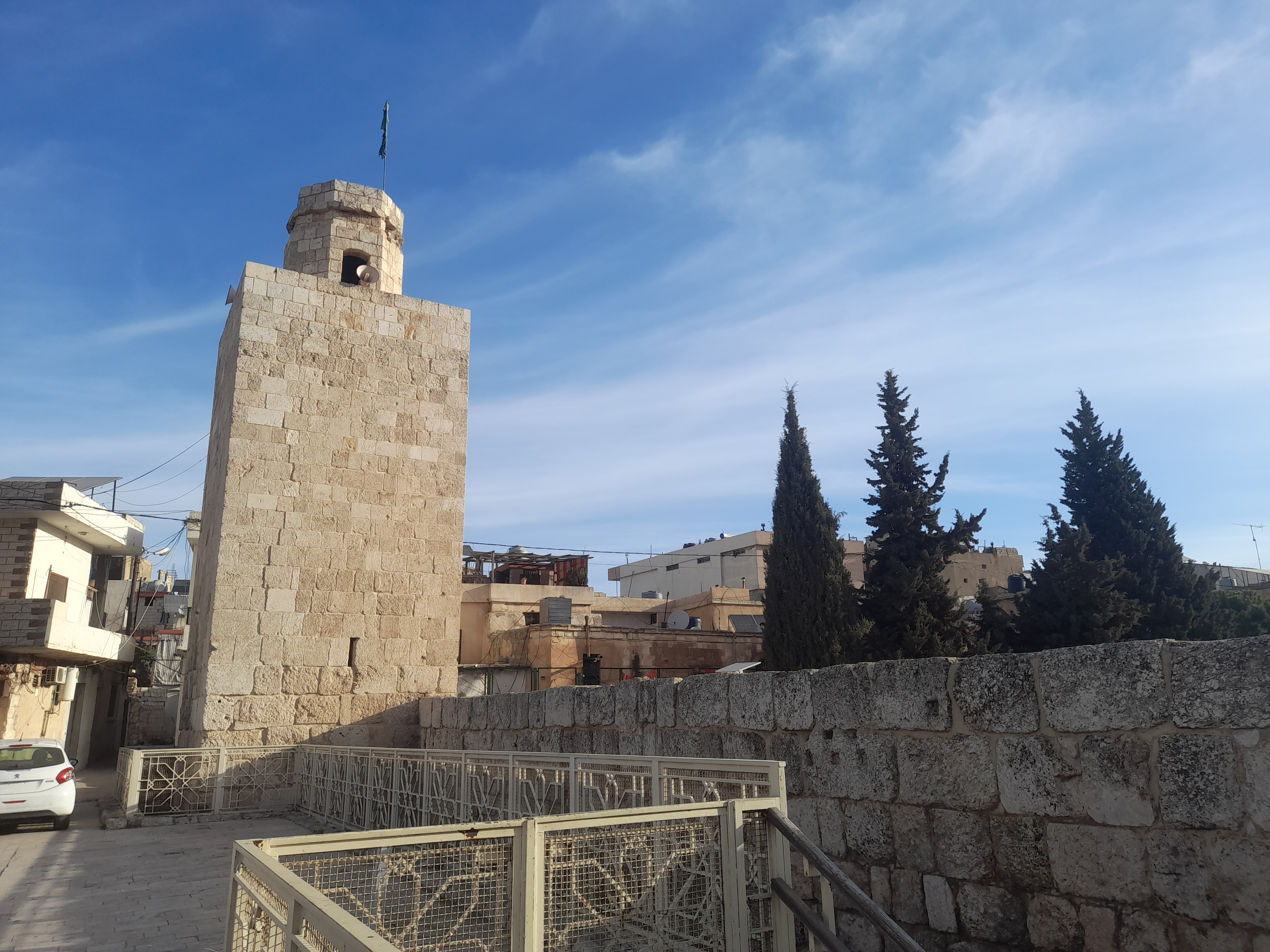
The Umayyad Mosque of Baalbek.

Lebanese Muslims form a large number of the total population, and they are divided into many sects, which include Sunnis, Shias, Alawites, and Ismailis.

Lebanese Sunnis are mainly residents of the major cities: west Beirut, Tripoli, and Sidon. Sunnis are also present in rural areas, which include Akkar, Ikleem al Kharoub, and the western Beqaa Valley.

Lebanese Shias are concentrated in Southern Lebanon, Baalbek District, Hermel District and the south Beirut (southern parts of Greater Beirut).

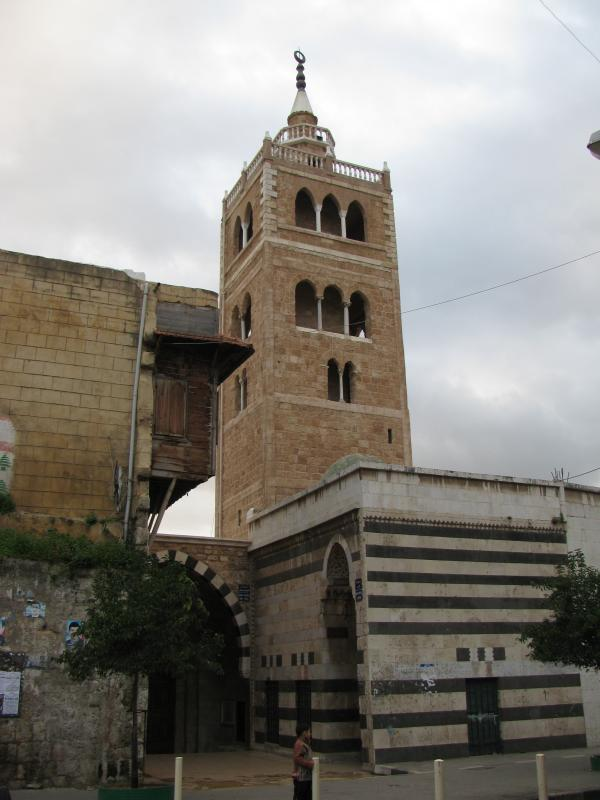
Minaret of the Mansouri Mosque in Tripoli

Distribution of Muslims in Lebanon by municipality

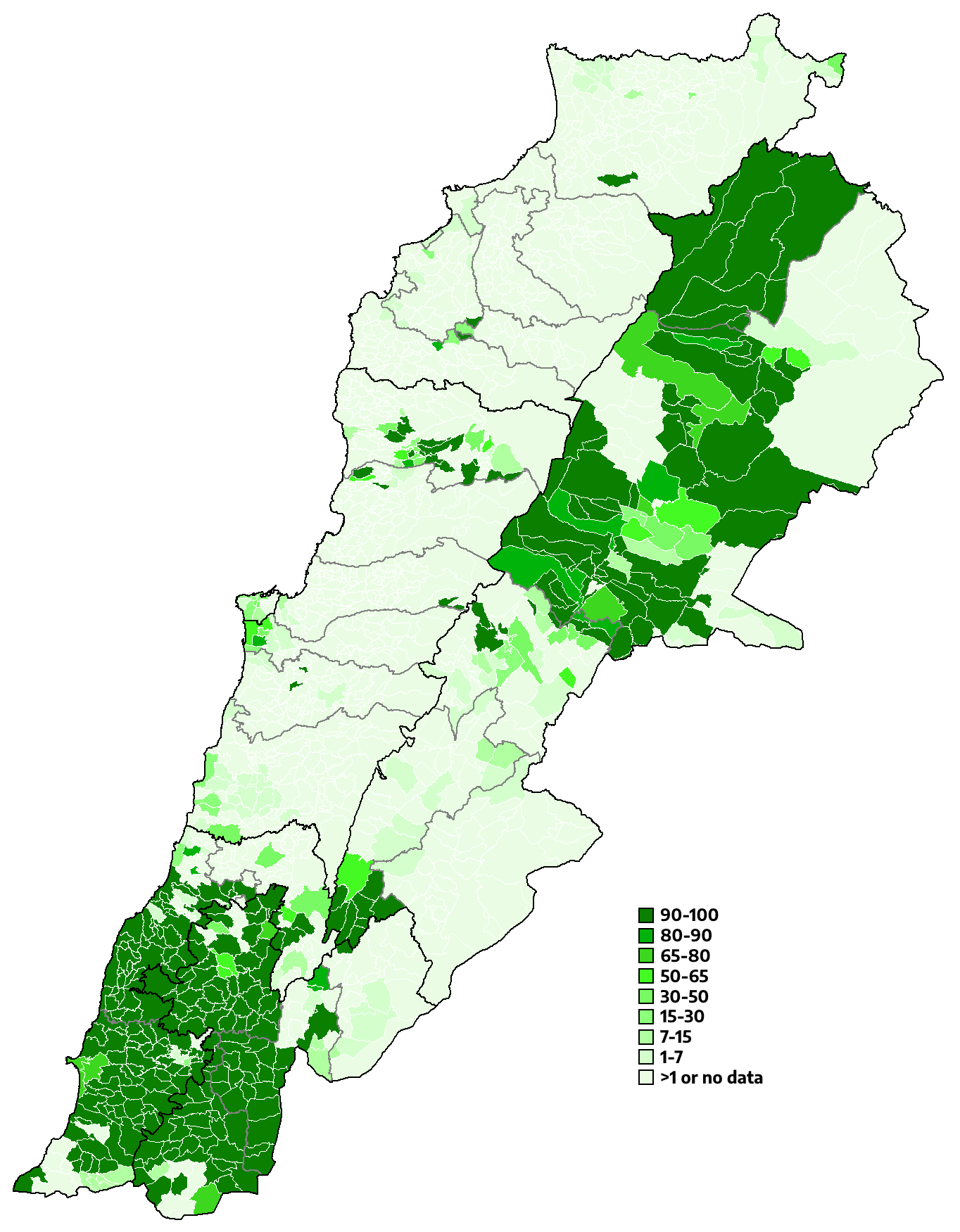
Shia Muslims

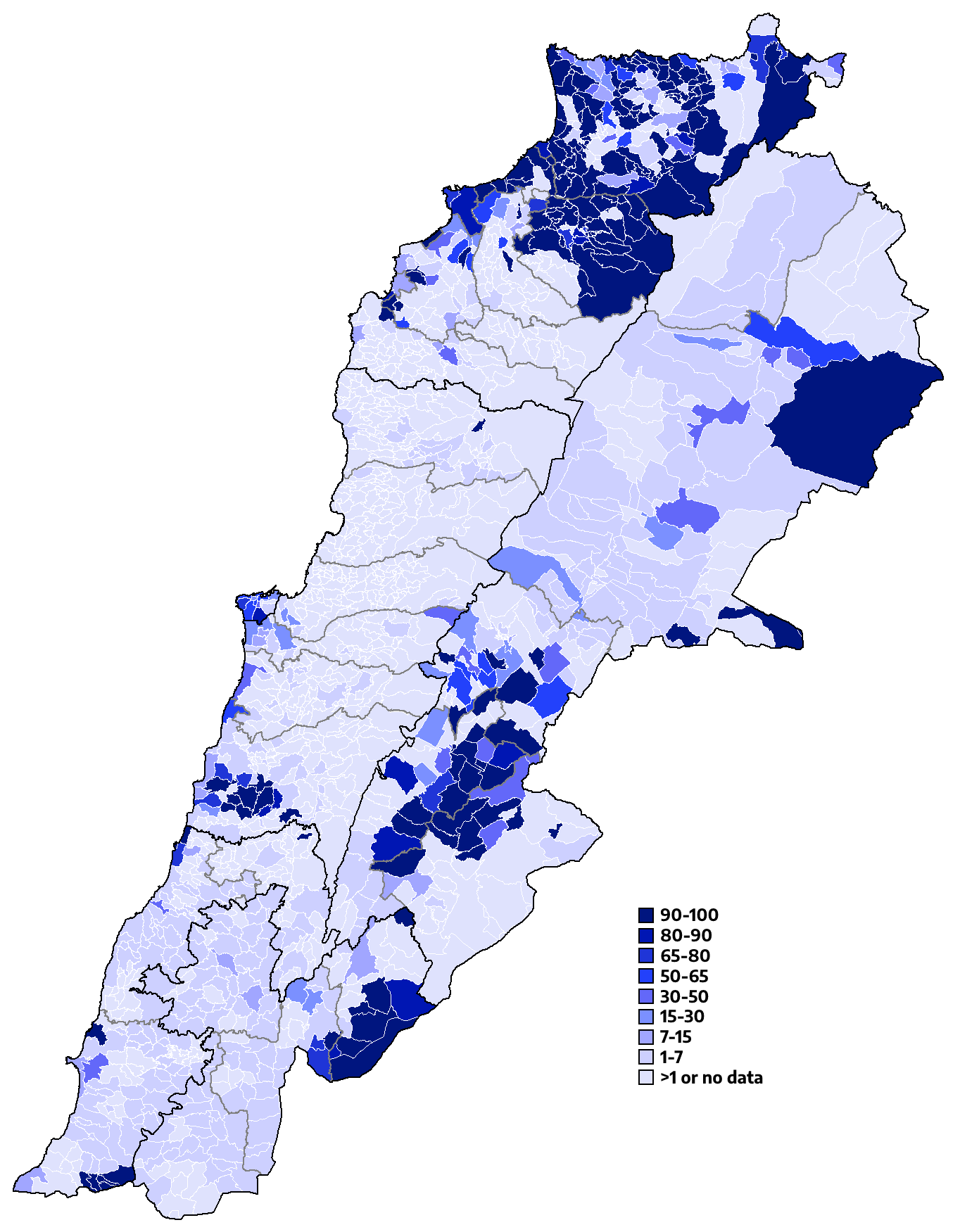
Sunni Muslims

=== Jews ===
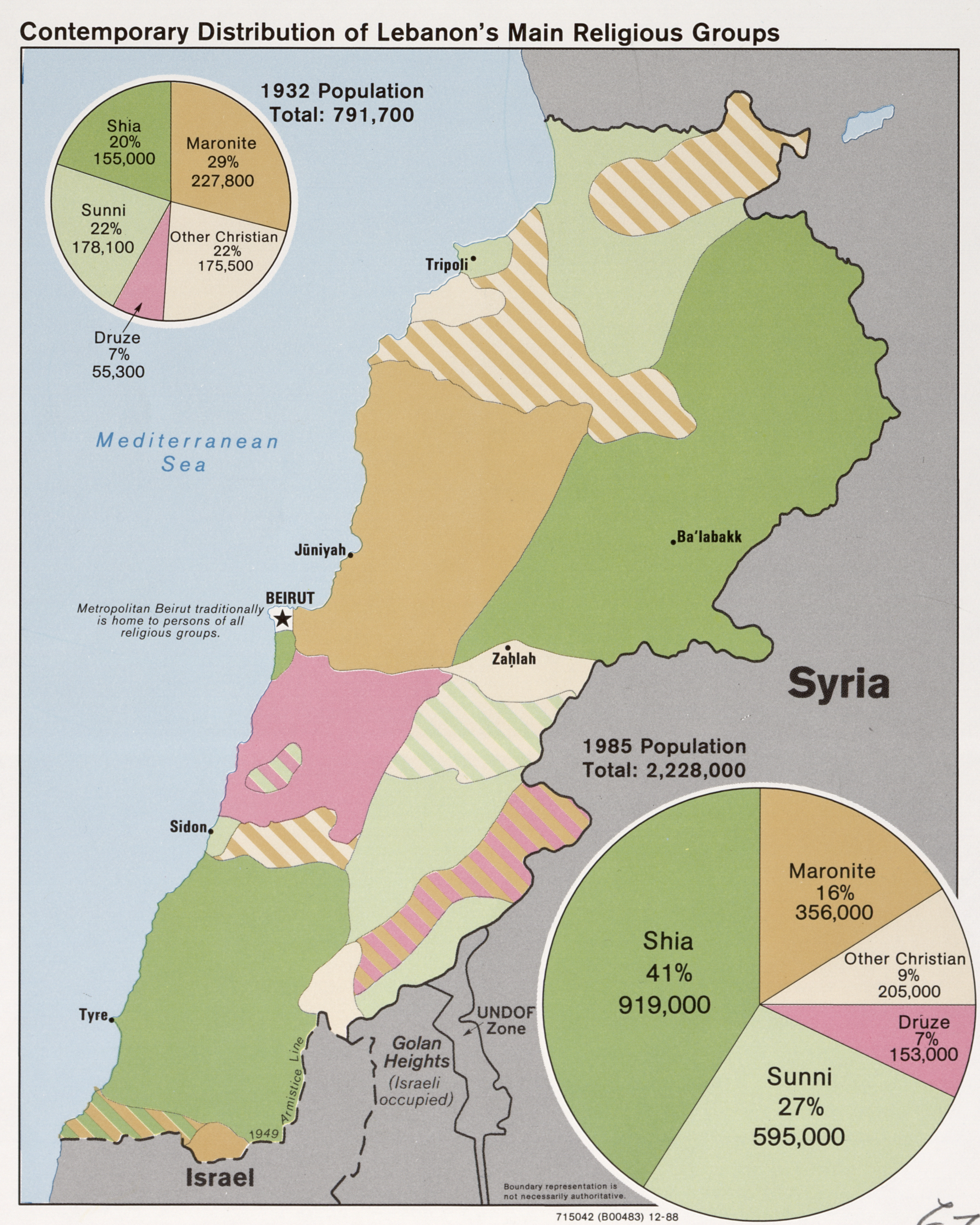
Estimated distribution of main religious groups, 1985, by the CIA

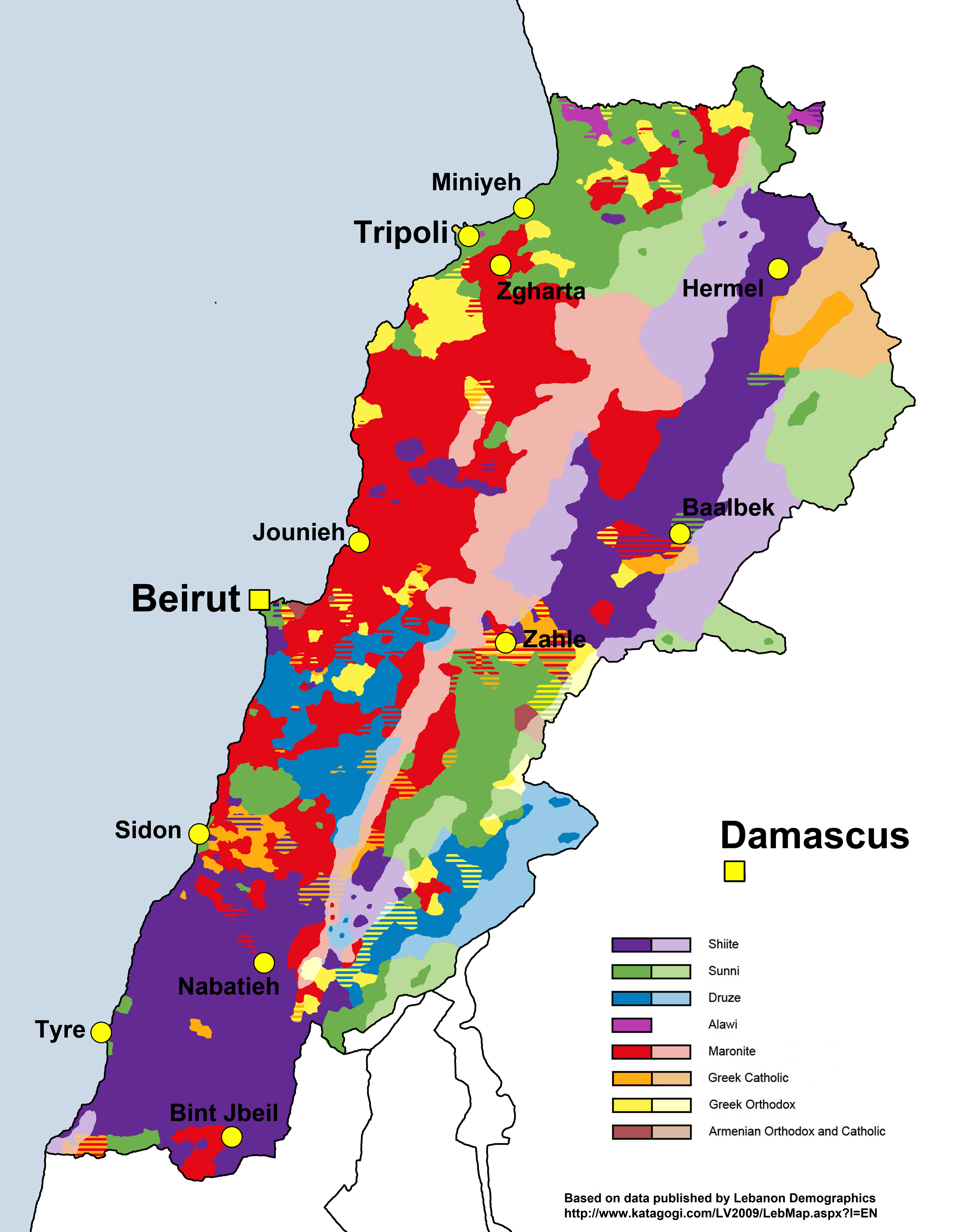
Lebanon religious groups distribution

Maps of religion distribution in Lebanon

As of 2023, the Jews in Lebanon make up the smallest recognized religious group, with merely, according to official statistics, 4000 persons or 0.11% of the population. However, these numbers are higher than in actuality due to unreported deaths. Efforts to locate Lebanese Jews are very rare.

The majority of the remaining Jewish population is concentrated in Beirut. The Jewish community was traditionally located in Wadi Abu Jamil and Ras Beirut, with other communities in Chouf, Deir al-Qamar, Aley, Bhamdoun, and Hasbaya.

== Religion and society ==
=== Religion and politics ===
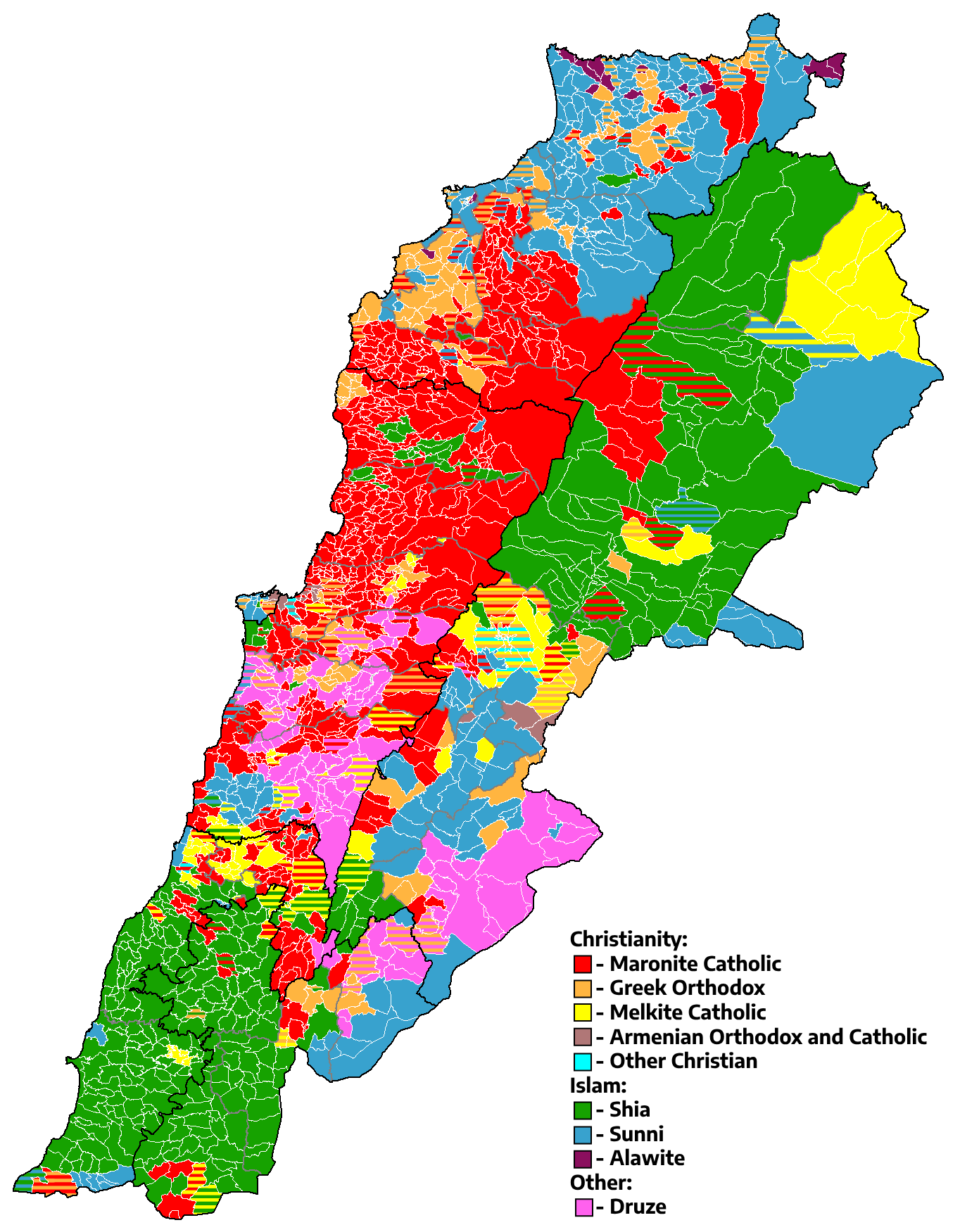
Religious map of Lebanon by municipality according to municipal elections data.

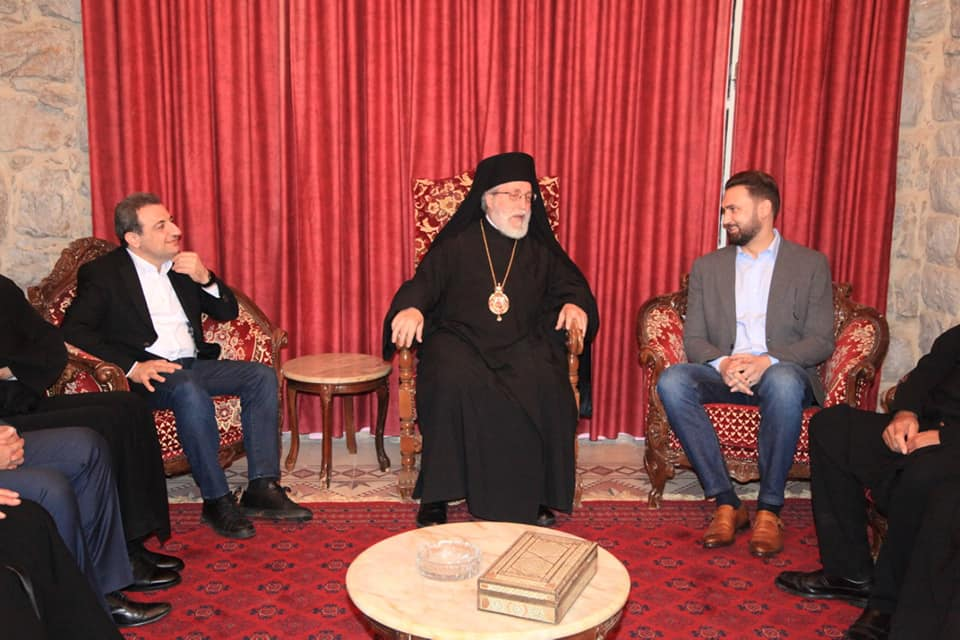
Taymur Jumblatt visits Eastern Orthodox Christian religious leaders.

The Maronite Catholics and the Druze founded modern Lebanon in the early eighteenth century, through a governing and social system known as the "Maronite-Druze dualism" in the Mount Lebanon Mutasarrifate.

Religion plays a major role in politics. Some researchers describe the political system in Lebanon as "coming out of the womb of religion and politics". After independence from France in 1943, the leaders of Lebanon agreed on the distribution of the political positions in the country according to religious affiliation, known as the National Pact. Under the terms of this agreement between the various political and religious leaders of Lebanon, the president of the country must be a Maronite, the prime minister must be a Sunni, and the speaker of Parliament must be a Shia. This has further sustained a power balance which has been founded on religious-sectarian values.

Many political parties are organized along sectarian lines and represent the interests of their respective religious communities. It is not rare to find the clergy involved in political activities, either as members or as leaders.

Since Lebanon is a country that is ruled by a sectarian system, family matters such as marriage, divorce and inheritance are handled by the religious authorities representing a person's faith. The modern Lebanese state regulates the intersection between rights, sex, and kinship through the simultaneous application of civil and personal status law and through civil institutions that provide oversight over the legal system as a whole. Calls for civil marriage are unanimously rejected by the religious authorities but civil marriages conducted in another country are recognized by Lebanese civil authorities. In the case of Lebanon, many Lebanese couples therefore conducted their civil marriage in Cyprus, which became a well-known destination for such instances.

Overall, societal norms and family dynamics create significant obstacles for mixed-sect couples in Lebanon, impacting their relationships and the acceptance of their unions within their communities and families. In practice mixed couples often state that they prioritize shared values rather than shared religion. In other words, it is more important to them that they are committed to believing in something larger than themselves rather than practicing the same religion. According to research by Lara Deeb, family opposition to mixed marriage is rarely about actual religious difference, but is far more rooted in status, regional differences, islamophobia and social pressure. Another finding of Deeb's research is that faith can also serve as a source of strength, helping parents accept their child's choice and bond with new in-laws.

Non-religion is not recognized by the state. However, following intense pressure and lobbying by the Civil Center for National Initiative, the Minister of the Interior Ziyad Baroud made it possible to have a citizen's religious sect removed from his identity card in 2009.

In April 2010, Laïque Pride, a secular group co-founded by feminist Yalda Younes, called for "an end to the country's deep-rooted sectarian system" and for a "secular Lebanon". Laïque Pride supports the enacting of a unified Civil Code for the Personal Status Law.

On April 26, 2010, in response to Hizb ut-Tahrir's growing appeal in Beirut and demands to re-establish an Islamic caliphate, a Laïque Pride march was held in Beirut. Three days later, 70,000 gathered in Martyrs' Square, Beirut for a march organized by Laïque Pride.

In 2011, hundreds of protesters rallied in Beirut on 27 February in a Laïque Pride march, calling for reform of the country's confessional political system. At the same time, a peaceful sit-in took place in Sidon.

In October 2019, and until August 2020, a series of civil protests ensued in Lebanon, now known as the 17 October Revolution condemning sectarian rule amongst a myriad of other issues plaguing their country. Lina Khatib, a journalist for Al Jazeera, has labelled these protests as "cross-sectarian". She notes: "They are taking place across Lebanon, rather than only in Beirut. And they are demanding the fall of the government from the outset, while criticizing political leaders from every sect."

== Aspects ==
Religion plays a major role of many everyday lives in Lebanon. Rituals, worship, and other religious activities are very prominent in an individual's daily life; it is also a principal organizer of social life. The degree of religiosity varies among individuals; in recent decades, religious households are becoming more connected through interreligious marriages.

=== Sacred sites and pilgrimages ===
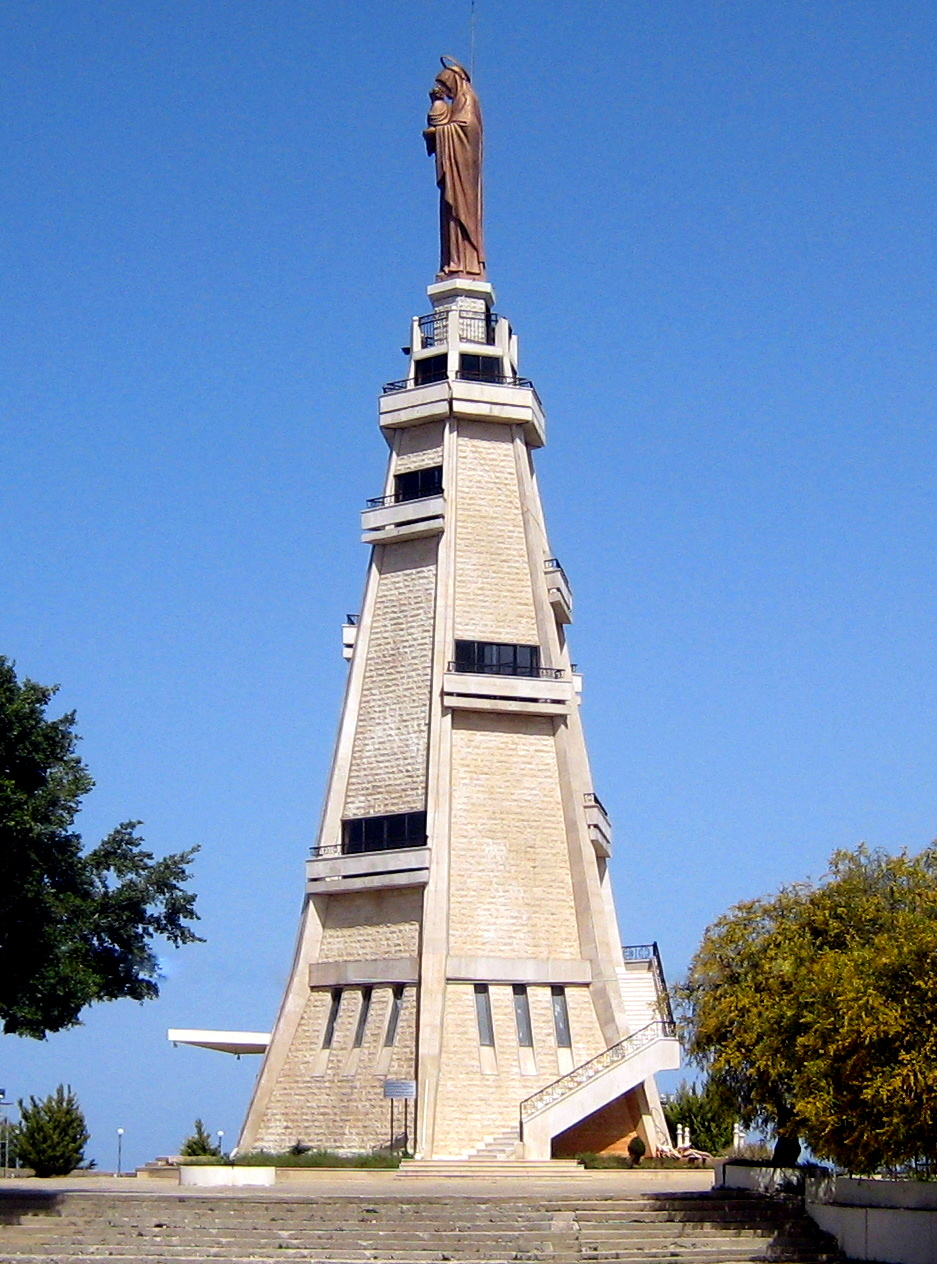
Our Lady of Mantara, a Melkite Greek Catholic Marian shrine, in Maghdouché, Lebanon.

Lebanon holds a historical significance in religious pilgrimages due its rich history of sacred sites admired by multiple faiths. Over the centuries, the shared religious sites have fostered a natural dialogue between the faithful from different religious communities. In May 1997, pope John Paul II proclaimed Lebanon as the Holy Land for its place in the Bible and its sacred sites.

Our Lady of Mantara is a Melkite Greek Catholic Marian shrine and sanctuary which is shared by many different religious communities. The sanctuary is in the Maghdouché village of South Lebanon, which overlooks the city of Sidon and the Palestinian refugee camp of Ain-el-Hilweh. Saydet El Mantara attracts pilgrims from all over Lebanon and the world. For Christians and Muslims, the shrine is regarded as a miraculous and blessed site. The Virgin of Maghdouche is visited particularly for eye problems, protection of children, and miracles are attributed to her like protecting the village from invaders and enemies. She is called ‘Umm el Kol’ (‘the mother of all’) who reaches out to all pilgrims from different denominations.

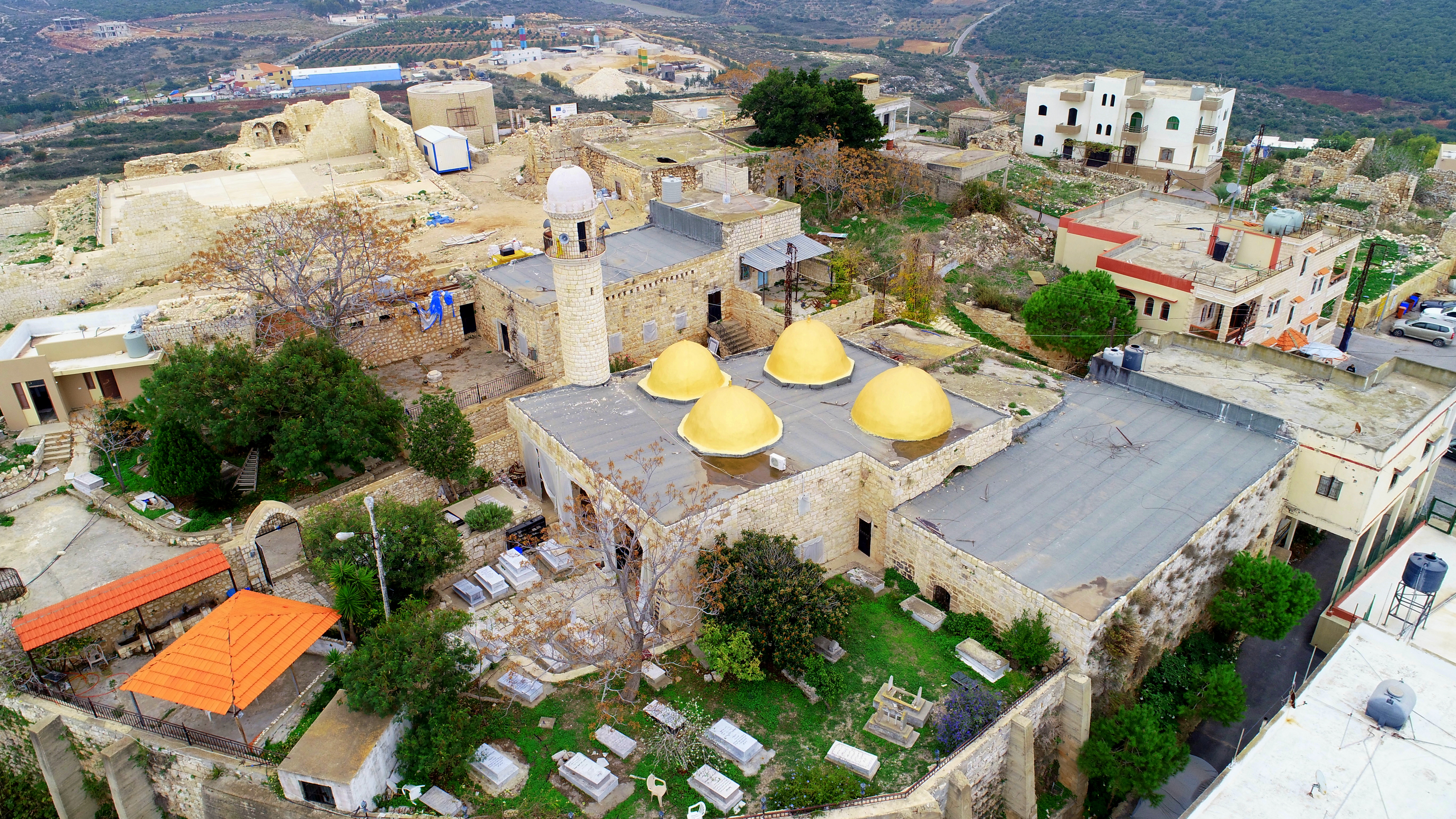
Maqam Shamoun Al Safa (Arabic: مقام شمعون الصفا), a Shi'ite Islamic shrine and mosque, located in the Shamaa village, in Tyre District of the South Governorate, Lebanon.

The Maqâm of Shamoun Al Safa is a Shi’ite Islamic shrine and mosque located in the Shamaa village in Tyre district in southern Lebanon. The shrine was built or renovated by the Fatimids in 1097. The shrine is dedicated to Shamoun Al Safa, identified as the apostle Peter who preached in the area in the 1st century. He is considered as a saint by the Roman Catholic and Orthodox churches under the name of Saint Peter, but also under the name of Shamoun El Safa by followers of Islam. On 15 November 2024, the shrine was heavily damaged during the 2024 Israeli invasion of Lebanon.

=== Figures ===
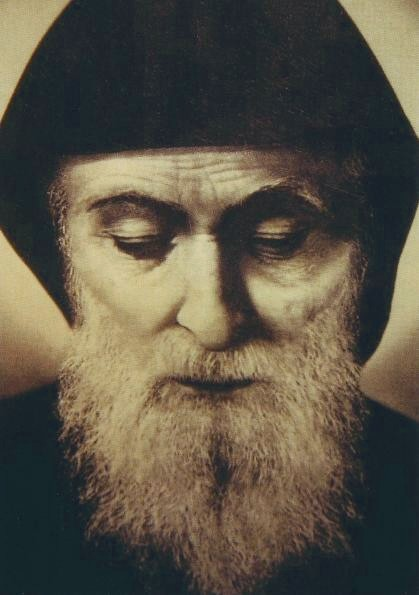
Saint Sharbel Makhlouf

Saint Sharbel Makhlouf (1828-1898), born as Yousef Antoun Makhlouf, in the village of Bkaakafra (North Lebanon). Saint Sharbal belonged to the Maronite community. He became Lebanon's first saint canonized by the Roman Catholic Church in 1977. There are little to no sources authored by himself; his younger life is lightly documented. Makhlouf was the youngest in a family of five children. His family lived in a rural mountain village. On 25 February 1950, his tomb was re-opened and his body remained still intact after 52 years. In the second investigation, files indicated that 2,200 miraculous events were recorded over a two-year period. By 1955, the Monastery of Saint Maron received more than 300,000 letters and thousands of pilgrims visiting the site. In December 2025, Pope Leo XIV became the first pope to visit Saint Sharbel Makhlouf in the Mount Lebanon region.

== Freedom of religion ==
According to Article 9 of the Lebanese Constitution, all religions and creeds are to be protected and the exercise of freedom of religion is to be guaranteed providing that the public order is not disturbed. In 2023 and 2024, Freedom House gave Lebanon a score of 3 out of 4 for freedom of religious expression.

An individual may change religions if the head of the religious group the person wishes to join approves of this change. Religion is encoded on national identity cards and noted on ikhraaj qaid (official registry) documents, and the Government complies with requests of citizens to change their civil records to reflect their new religious status. In Lebanon, proselytizing is not punishable by law in contrast to many countries in the Arab World.

Unrecognized groups, such as Baháʼís, Buddhists, Hindus, and some evangelical denominations, may own property and assemble for worship without government interference. However, they are disadvantaged under the law because legally they may not marry, divorce, or inherit property in the country.

== Gallery ==
Mohammad Al-Amin Mosque in downtown Beirut

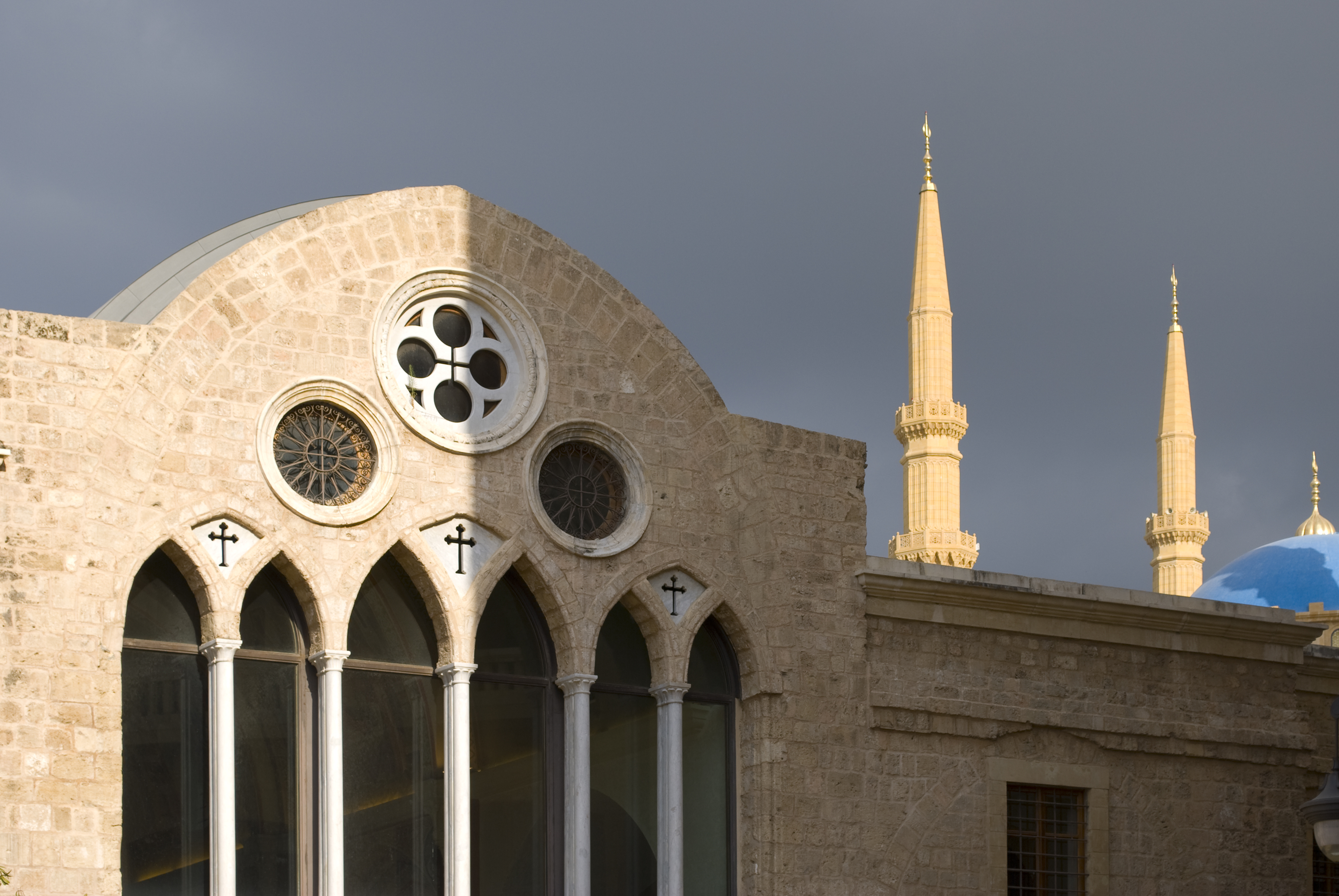
Saint George Eastern Orthodox Cathedral in downtown Beirut

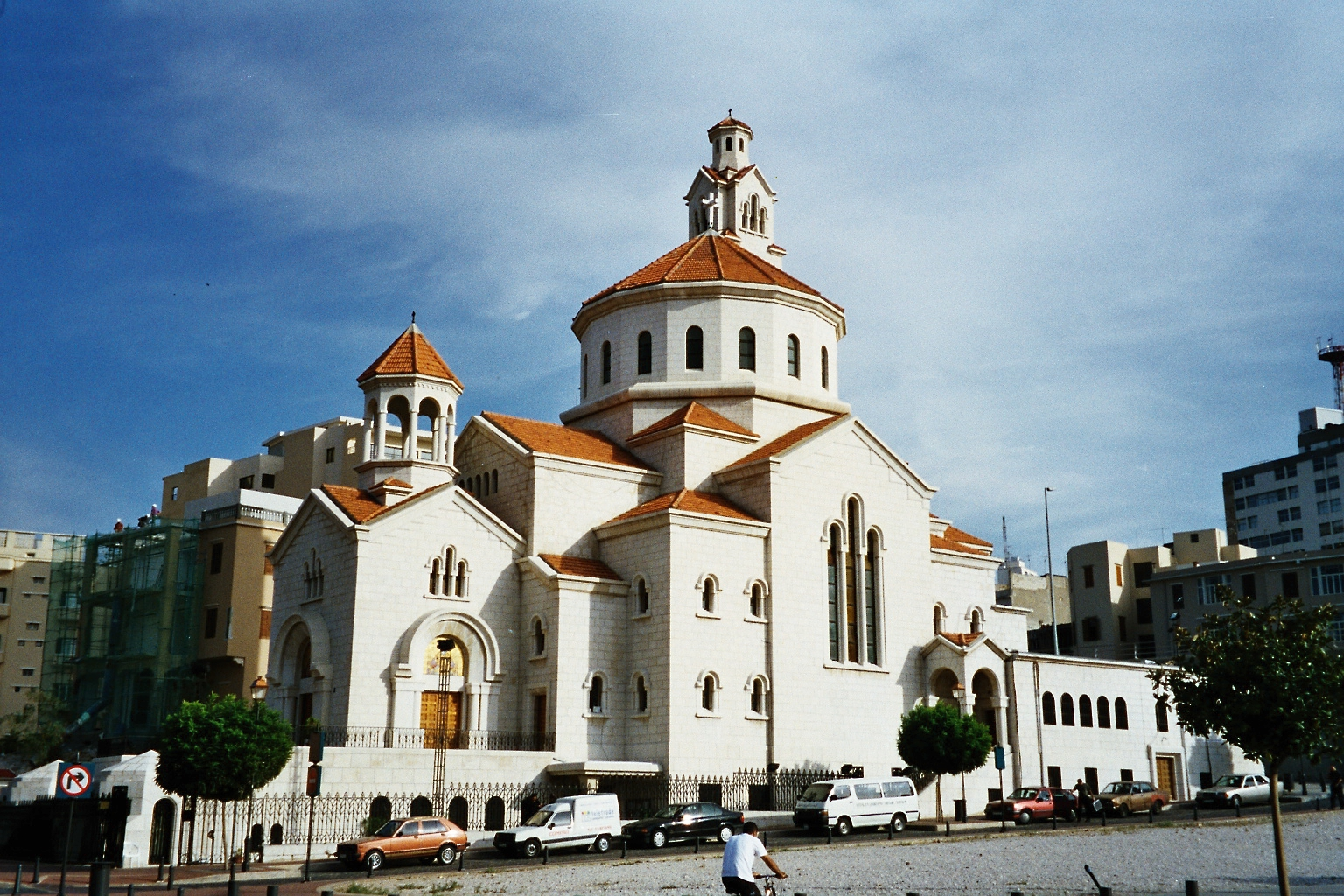
Cathedral of Saint Elias and Saint Gregory the Illuminator in Beirut

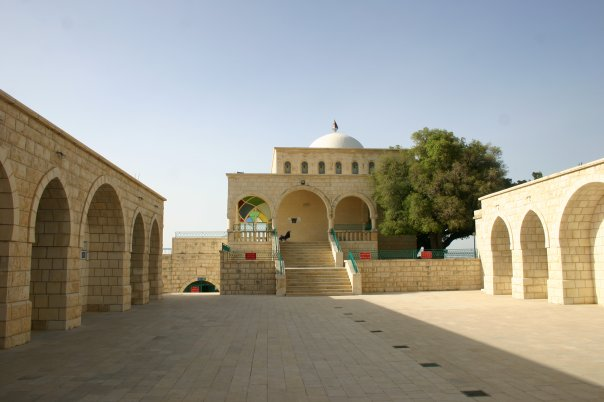
Druze Prophet of Job Shrine

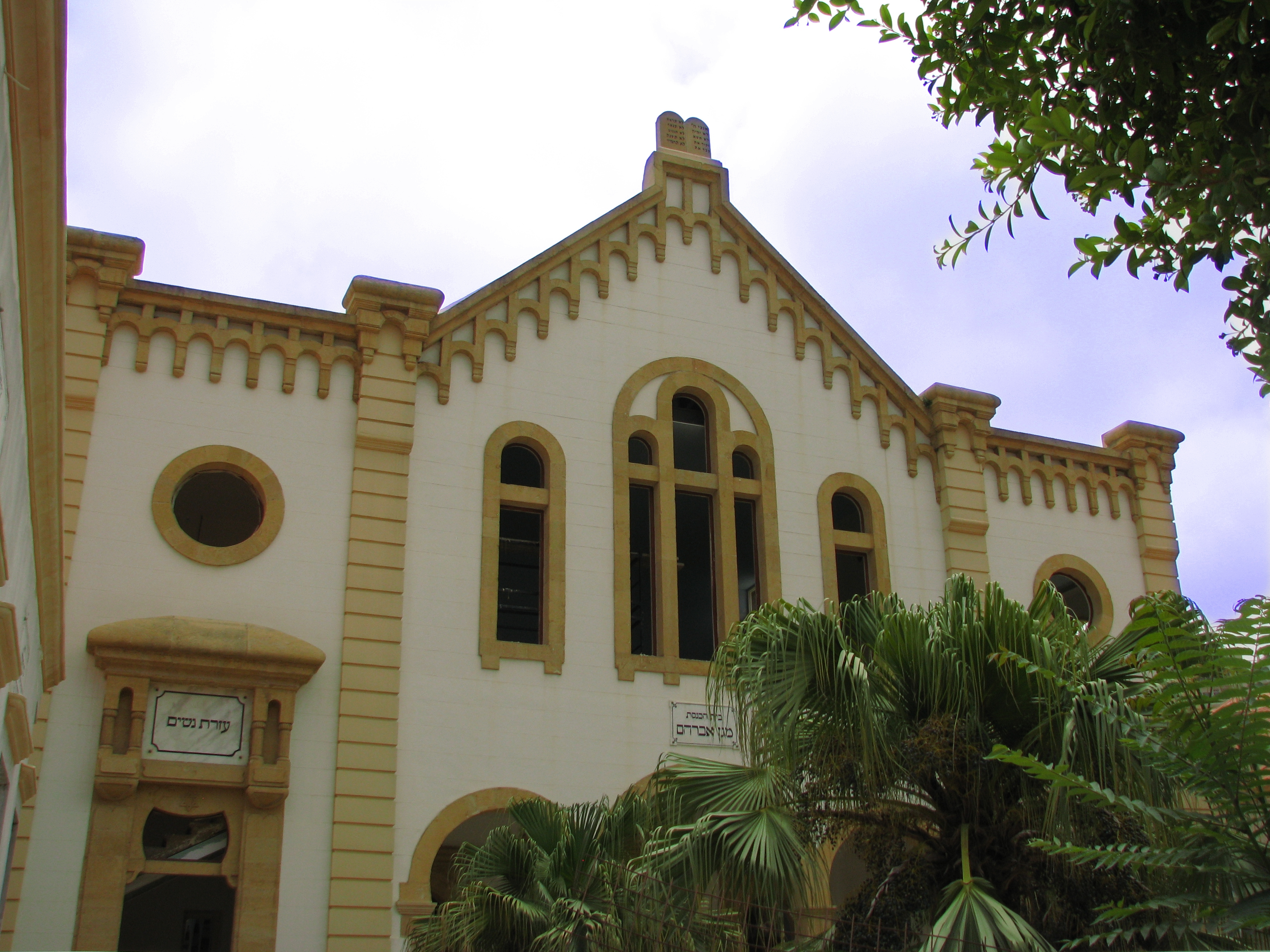
Maghen Abraham Synagogue in Wadi Abu Jamil, Beirut

== See also ==
- Christianity in Lebanon
- Islam in Lebanon
- History of the Jews in Lebanon
- Secularism in Lebanon
- Irreligion in Lebanon
- Freedom of religion in Lebanon
- Freemasonry in Lebanon
- Demographics of Lebanon
