= Monastery of Saint Maron =

Cave and former Maronite monastery in Lebanon

- Deir Mar Maroun
- Location within Lebanon
- 34.35°N 36.366667°E
- Periods: Ancient Rome, Byzantine Empire, Mamluk, Ottoman Empire
- Location: Beqaa Valley, Lebanon

Site notes
- Condition: recently cleaned, falling into disrepair
- Public access: Yes

The Monastery of Saint Maron (Arabic, Latinized: Deir Mar Maroun), also called the Cave of the Monks, is an ancient cavern initially developed as a refuge structure by the Romans and later used as a Maronite monastery and carved out of solid rock in the side of a cliff. It is located around 200 metres (660 ft) from Ain ez Zarqa, the source of the Orontes River, south of Hermel in Baalbek-Hermel Governorate, northern Lebanon.

== History ==
The cavern is situated 90 metres (300 ft) above the river. It consists of three levels with rock stairways, numerous altars, and small cells, suggested to have been the residence of Saint Maron and his early followers in the fourth century CE, during the foundation of the Maronite Church. It is suggested that Maron worked and even died in the monastery. Later occupation in Mamluk and Ottoman Empire periods is attested by loopholes cut into the walls. The monastery is commonly thought to have been constructed by Romans, however the date, builders and origins of the structure are not certain.

The structure has fallen into disrepair, having been used as shelter for sheep, goats, and the occasional shepherd over the years. The cavern is located on land owned by the Lebanese Ministry of Energy and Water, but has been the subject of an ongoing dispute between the Maronite Archdiocese and the Dandash family, who stake an old claim on the land. The Maronite Archdiocese has retained rights to renovate the landmark and has stated its intention to begin a restoration project.

It is noteworthy to pinpoint that historians Della Volpe and D'Ambrosio think that the structure built by the Romans in the second century was not a refuge but a defense fortification of the fertile Beqaa valley (colonised by Roman veterans in Pagus Augusti and in Heliopolis) against the Persian attacks from the north.

This amazing three-level cave/monastery is cut into sheer rock that is more than 90 meters high. The site is made up of an altar, staircase and small cells carved from the rock. According to some historians, Roman engineers were the first to inhabit the site in the second century, staying in an opening they carved into rocks while they worked to irrigate the surrounding areas.In the fourth century, Saint Maron, a Syriac monk, is said to have inhabited the cave.

It is suggested that Maron worked there (with many disciples, including: James of Cyrrhus, Limnaeus, Domnina, Cyra, Marana, Abraham the Hermit) and even died in the monastery.

Even if greatly damaged during Arab conquest of the region, later occupation in Mamluk and Ottoman Empire periods is attested by loopholes cut into the walls. The monastery is commonly thought to have been constructed by Romans, however the date, builders and origins of the structure are not certain.

== Restoration ==
The cavern is located on land owned by the Lebanese Ministry of Energy and Water, but has been the subject of an ongoing dispute between the Maronite Archdiocese and the Dandash family, who also assert a claim on the land. The Maronite Archdiocese has retained rights to renovate the landmark and has stated its intention to begin a restoration project.

The site has only reported to have been cleaned and no work has started on the monument, even if suggested to be of national importance.

== See also ==
- Maronites
- Roman Phoenicia
