= Ain ez Zarqa =

Coordinates: 34°21′08″N 36°22′23″E

Ain ez Zarqa (also spelled Ayn ez Zarqa or Ain-el-Zerqa) is a natural artesian karst spring located south of Hermel in the Beqaa Governorate, in central Lebanon. Producing an average of 3,435 gallons per second, it is the main source of the Orontes River. Because of its heavy flow, it is characterized as a first-magnitude spring. It sits beneath the caves at Deir Mar Maroun, an ancient monastery carved into the cliffs that surround the spring. Melting snow from these nearby heights supplements the spring's large groundwater reservoir, in the Jurassic and Cretaceous strata. It is estimated that the spring's phreatic zone reservoir contains as much as 10 billion cubic metres of storage. As a result, its flow has been less affected by overpumping and drought than other springs in the Orontes river basin.
