= Baháʼí Faith in Lebanon =

The Baháʼí Faith (بهائی) has a following of at least several hundred people in Lebanon dating back to 1870. The community includes around 400 people, with a centre in Beit Mery, just outside the capital Beirut, and cemeteries in Machgara and Khaldeh. On the other hand, the Association of Religion Data Archives (relying on World Christian Encyclopedia) estimated some 3,900 Baháʼís in 2005.

== History ==
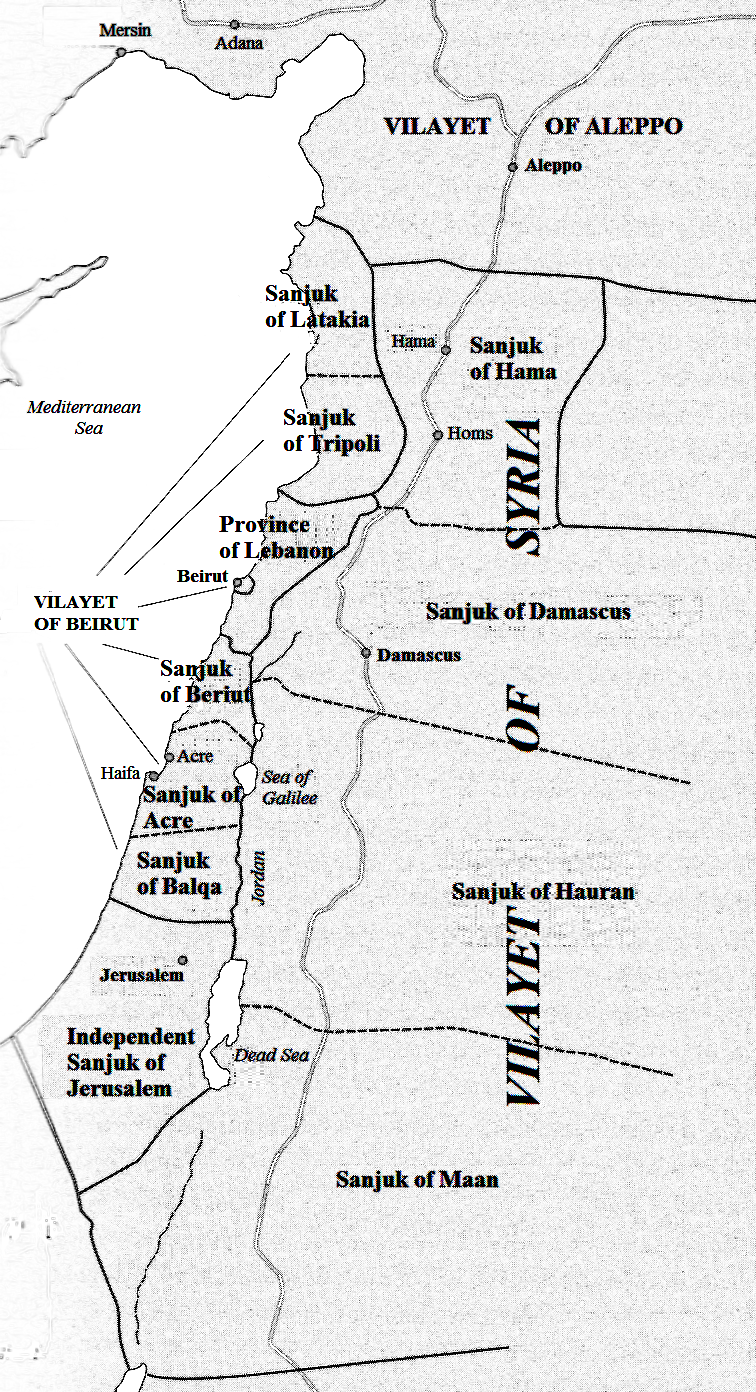
Ottoman subdivisions when the first Baháʼís came to Lebanon

The first Baháʼís who came to present day Lebanon were Iranians who came in the 1870s. The founder of the Baháʼí Faith, Baháʼu'lláh, was exiled to Acre, which was at the time was part of the same Ottoman province, or vilayet, of Beirut.

In 1880, Baháʼu'lláh's son ʻAbdu'l-Bahá, visited Beirut at the invitation of Midhat Pasha, the Ottoman governor of the Syria Vilayet. A Beirut newspaper described his visit by saying "His Excellency, the learned, erudite, intelligent and illustrious ʻAbbas Effendi, resident of the city of ʻAkka, has arrived in our city". Following the visit Baha'u'llah wrote the "Tablet of the Land of Ba (Beirut)", later described as a "glowing tribute" to ʻAbdu'l-Bahá.

During his visits to Beirut, ʻAbdu'l-Bahá also met Muhammad Abduh, one of the key figures of Islamic Modernism and the Salafi movement, at a time when the two men were both opposed to the Ottoman ulama and shared similar goals of religious reform. Rashid Rida asserts that during his visits to Beirut, ʻAbdu'l-Bahá would attend Abduh's study sessions. Regarding the meetings of ʻAbdu'l-Bahá and Muhammad ʻAbduh, Shoghi Effendi asserts that "His several interviews with the well-known Shaykh Muhammad ʻAbdu served to enhance immensely the growing prestige of the community and spread abroad the fame of its most distinguished member."

In 1894 a Lebanese Christian, Ibrahim George Kheiralla, converted to the Baháʼí Faith whilst traveling in Cairo. After Abdu'l-Bahá wrote a specific tablet to him, he moved to Chicago in the United States and was instrumental in converting many of the early Baháʼí followers there.

Two Beirut universities - the American University of Beirut and the Saint Joseph University - had significant Baha'i student populations in the early twentieth century. The first Baha'i student was recorded in the 1890s, the “Society of the Baháʼí Students of Beirut" was formed in 1906 and by 1929 there were over 60 Baha'i students from Iran, Iraq, Egypt and Palestine. The university promoted "internationalism" as a core value and acknowledged the Baha'i students as a significant contribution to this vision. The Baha'i leader, Shoghi Effendi, studied at the American University of Beirut, graduating in 1917.

A Shia Sheikh in the eastern village of Machgara, Jaʼafar Al-Tahhan, converted to the Baháʼí Faith in 1923, and that village is now the centre of the community, with the only Lebanese local Spiritual Assembly.

The Encyclopedia of the Orient reported that there were 4,000 Baháʼís living in Lebanon, or around 0.13% of the population.

In 1968, a prominent Baháʼí academic, Suheil Bushrui, became a visiting professor at the American University of Beirut. In the 1980s he was appointed an advisor by President Amine Gemayel, indicating how Baháʼís are accepted. Bushrui was a noted scholar on Khalil Gibran, having published more than one volume about him and served as the Kahlil Gibran Chair for Values and Peace at the University of Maryland.

== Treatment ==
The Baha'i Faith is not one of the 18 recognised sects in Lebanon, so many Baháʼís are officially listed according to the religion of their ancestors, mostly Shiite. Baháʼí marriages are therefore not recognised, so Baháʼís tend to travel to Cyprus to have a civil wedding, which is recognised when they return. Baháʼís often face backlash and oppression for practicing their faith, such as an attack on the Baha'i cemetery in Machgara in 2023, in which tombstones were broken, which has led to many leaving the country. .

== See also ==
- Khalil Gibran who knew ʻAbdu'l-Bahá, head of the religion in his lifetime.
- History of Lebanon
- Religion in Lebanon
