= Marco Augusto Dueñas =

Spanish sculptor

Marco Augusto Dueñas (born 1971) is a sculptor, born in Córdoba, Spain.

In 1986 he joined the Madrid Schools of Arts and Crafts for three years, combining his studies with work as a jewellery designer. At 17 he designed and created sculptures for private individuals and restored the altar of the church of the former convent of the Merced County Council. In 1993 he graduated from the Mateo Inurria Art School in Córdoba, Spain.

In 2005 he was invited to participate in a global contest by Pope Benedict XVI to make a sculpture of Santa Rafaela María Porras, to be exhibited in the Vatican. The sculpture, 6 metres (19.7 ft) high and made of white marble, is permanently exposed on the exterior facade of St. Peter's Basilica and was blessed by the Pope on 20 January 2010. During that year, he was asked, yet again, to create another sculpture for the Vatican - of Saint Maron. The sculpture, 5.4 metres (17.7 ft) high and made of white Carrara marble, is exposed on the exterior facade of St. Peter's Basilica and blessed by the Pope on 23 February 2011. Some of his sculptures and bas-reliefs have been made for Almudena Cathedral.
