= Maron =

Monk and namesake of the Maronite Church

Saint Maron
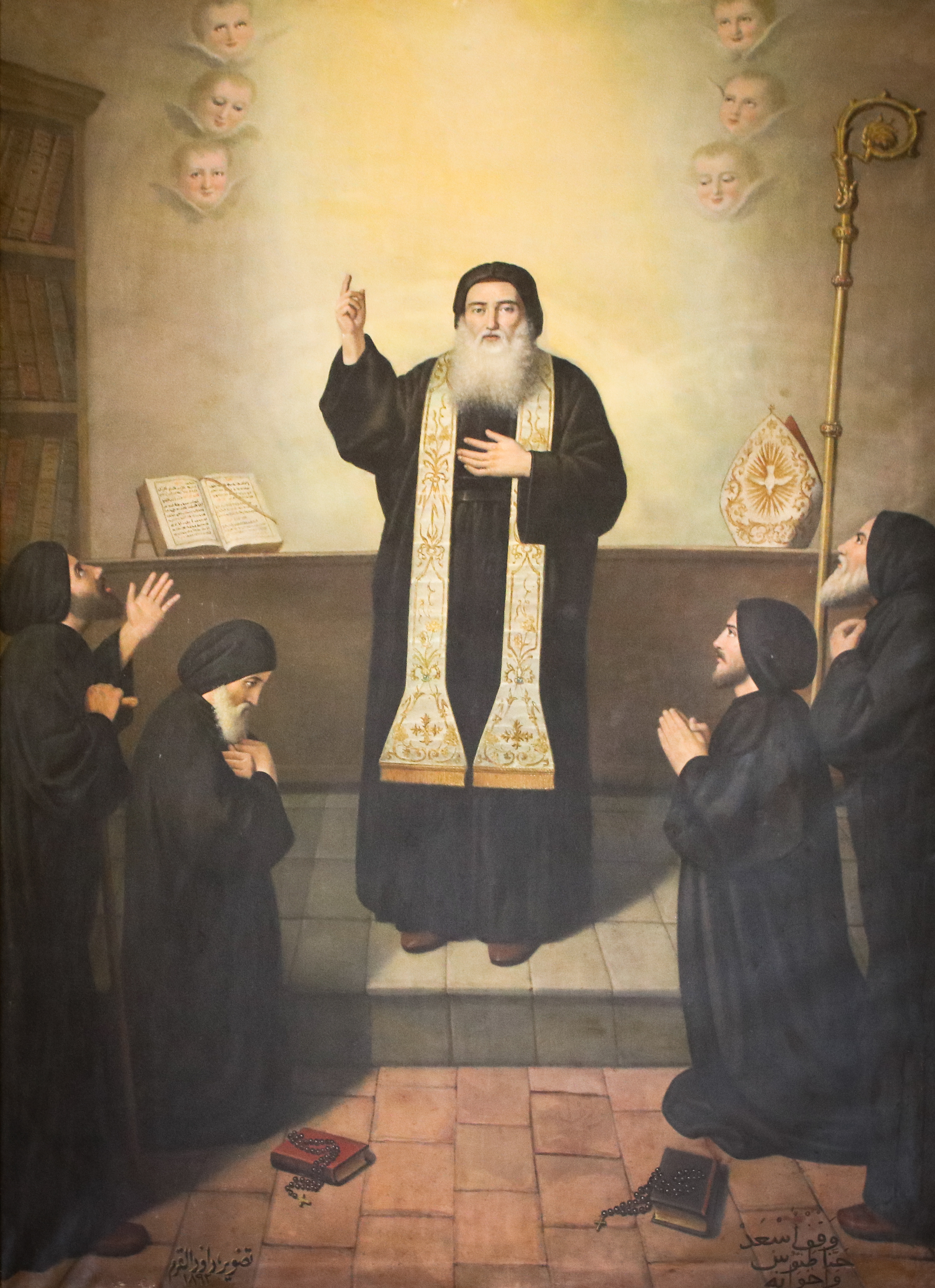
- 19th-century depiction of Saint Maron
- Born: 340 AD; Coele Syria, Eastern Roman Empire (Modern-day Syria)
- Died: 410 AD (aged 70); Kalota, Coele Syria, Eastern Roman Empire
- Venerated in: Catholic Church (especially Maronite Church); Eastern Orthodox Church
- Feast: February 9 (Maronite Church); February 14 (Eastern Orthodox Church)

Maron, also called Maroun or Maro (Syriac: ܡܪܘܢ, Mārōn; Arabic: مَارُون, Mārūn; Latin: Maron; Ancient Greek: Μάρων), was a 4th-century Syriac Christian hermit monk in the Taurus Mountains whose followers, after his death, founded a religious Christian movement that became known as the Maronite Church which is presently in full communion with the Holy See and the Catholic Church. The religious community which grew from this movement are the modern Maronites.

Maron, revered as a highly spiritual ascetic monk with a connection to God through his communion with the natural environment, garnered widespread respect within Christian circles. In addition to his emphasis on ascetic spirituality, he played an important role in advancing Christian missions in the region. One of his disciples, Abraham of Cyrrhus, emerged as a missionary, successfully disseminating the Maronite variant of Christianity in Lebanon, which took root in the region and persisted ever since.

Saint Maron is often portrayed in a black monastic habit with a hanging stole, accompanied by a long crosier staffed by a globe surmounted with a cross. His feast day in the Maronite Church is February 9.

== Life ==
Maron, born in what is now modern Syria, in the middle of the 4th century, was a priest who later became a hermit, retiring to the Taurus Mountains in the region of Cyrrhus, near Antioch. His holiness and miracles attracted many followers, and drew attention throughout the empire. John Chrysostom wrote to him around AD 405 expressing his great love and respect, and asking Maron to pray for him. Maron and Chrysostom are believed to have studied together in the great Christian learning center at Antioch, which at the time was the third largest city in the Roman Empire.

Maron embraced a life of quiet solitude in the mountains north-west of Aleppo. He was known for his simplicity and his extraordinary desire to discover God's presence in all things.

Maron is considered the Father of the spiritual and monastic movement now called the Maronite Church.

== Monastic spirituality ==
Maron's way was deeply monastic with emphasis on the spiritual and ascetic aspects of living. For Maron, all was connected to God and God was connected to all. He did not separate the physical and spiritual world and actually used the physical world to deepen his faith and spiritual experience with God. He was able to free himself from the physical world by his passion and fervour for prayer and enter into a mystical relationship of love with God.

He lived his life in the open air next to a temple he had transformed to a church. He spent his time in prayer and meditation exposed to the forces of nature such as sun, rain, hail and snow. Theodoret of Cyrrhus wrote that this was a new type of asceticism that soon enjoyed wide acceptance in Syria and Lebanon. His Religious History, written around AD 440, mentions fifteen men and three women who followed this practice, many of them trained or guided by Maron.

== Missionary ==
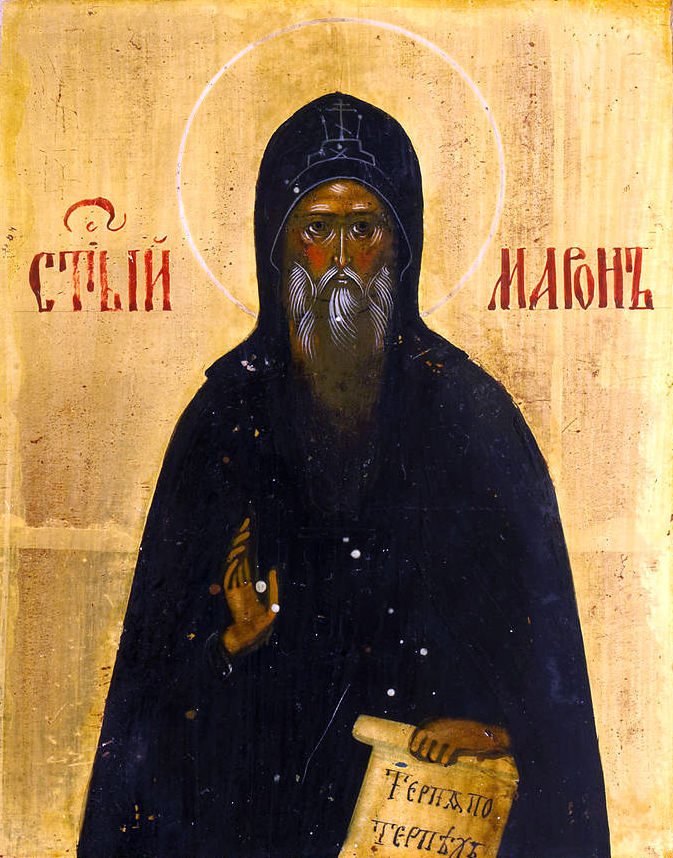
Russian Orthodox icon of Saint Maron

Saint Maron was a mystic who initiated a new ascetic-spiritual approach that attracted people in the region encompassing what is now Syria and Lebanon to become his disciples. Accompanying his spiritual and ascetic life, he was a zealous missionary with a passion for spreading the message of Christ by preaching it to all he encountered. He sought not only to heal physical ailments but also had a commitment to nurturing and healing the “lost souls” of both non-Christians and Christians of his time.

This missionary work came to fruition when, in the mountains of the region, Saint Maron was able to convert a temple into a Christian church in Kafr Nabu. This marked the beginning of the conversion to Christianity in the region, which would eventually influence and spread to the ancient region of Mount Lebanon. After his death in the year 410 in Kalota, his spirit and teachings continued to thrive through his disciples.

The exact location of his burial is a topic of debate. Some Lebanese sources, such as Giuseppe Simone Assemani and Maronite bishop Yusef al-Dibs, believed he was buried in Arethusa or modern-day al-Rastan along the Orontes River in the region, while others, like Jesuit priest Henri Lammens, have claimed he is buried in Brad village to the north of Aleppo.

The Maronite movement reached Mount Lebanon when Saint Maron’s first disciple, Abraham of Cyrrhus, who was called the Apostle of Lebanon, realized that there were many non-Christians in the ancient region of Mount Lebanon, and he set out to convert them to Christianity by introducing them to the teachings of Saint Maron. William of Tyre, chronicling his arrival in the region of Lebanon during the crusades, writes of the Maronites that they took their name from a certain Maro, whose heresies (described as monothelitism) they followed for “almost five hundred years,” but which they recanted at the time of William’s report. Though William of Tyre’s indictment of “Maro and his followers” as monothelite heretics has resulted in controversy among scholars, in all probability, he was mistakenly referring to a Maro from Edessa instead of the fourth-century St. Maro. Maronite historians argue that they have always remained in full communion with Rome. Saint Maron’s feast day is celebrated on February 9.

== Veneration ==
Saint Maron was known for his gift for healing.

== Patronages ==
- Maronites and the Maronite Church
- The town of Volperino in Italy. After being brought to Sassovivo Abbey in Foligno, Saint Maron's relics were kept for a long time in the tiny village of Volperino, before being transferred to Saint Felicianus Cathedral church in Foligno.
- The Eparchy of Saint Maron of Brooklyn
- The Eparchy of Saint Maron of Canada - Montréal, Canada - Official Website
- The Eparchy of Saint Maron of Australia.

== Notable recognitions ==
On 23 February 2011, Pope Benedict XVI unveiled a statue of Saint Maron on the outer wall of Saint Peter's Basilica in the Vatican and imparted his Apostolic Blessing. The 15 feet tall statue was commissioned by the Maronite Church to the Spanish sculptor Marco Augusto Dueñas. The saint appears in the sculpture holding a miniature, Maronite style church; the sculpture also features an inscription in Syriac reading: The righteous will flourish like a palm tree, they will grow like a cedar of Lebanon. The statue occupied the last available niche in the outer perimeter of Saint Peter's Basilica.

In June 2012, an impressionist painting of Saint Maron, as well as several icons based on images from the 5th-century Syriac Rabboula manuscript including the Crucifixion, the Marian icon of the "Mother of Light" and the Evangelists, was donated, installed and was solemnly attended by Cardinal Donald Wuerl at the National Shrine of the Immaculate Conception in Washington D.C., and was formally dedicated on September 23, 2012.

== See also ==
- James the Solitary
- Syriac Maronite Church
- 5th century in Lebanon
