= James the Solitary =

James the Solitary was a hermit saint of the fifth century and a student of St. Maron, patriarch of the Maronite Catholic Church. He is commemorated on November 26.

James of Cyrrhus had been taught by St. Maron and later went off to live by himself. James lived his ascetic life as a man without bodily shelter, on a mountain not far from the city of Cyrrhus in Syria. James was known for his wisdom and powerful gift of intercession. He was even called upon to counsel Byzantine Emperor Leo regarding matters relating to the Council of Chalcedon.

Saint James the Solitary is commemorated 26 November in the Eastern Orthodox Church, Western Rite Orthodox communities, and in Eastern Catholic Churches of Byzantine Rite.

== See also ==
- Simeon Stylites, contemporary of James the Solitary
- Poustinia
