= Freemasonry in Lebanon =

Freemasonry in Lebanon started with the chartering of a Lodge by the Grand Lodge of Scotland in 1861, and has expanded to include the Grand Lodge of Lebanon as well as lodges working in Arabic, English, and French and chartered by three regular jurisdictions. There are also over two dozen clandestine and irregular lodges.

== History ==
The first regular Masonic Lodge to be erected in Lebanon was chartered by the Grand Lodge of Scotland on May 6, 1861 and was given the name Palestine Lodge No. 415 and operated in French. This lodge operated in Beirut but became dormant in 1895. Four other Scottish lodges were chartered in Lebanon before the First World War. The Grand Orient of France chartered a lodge in 1869, working in Arabic. Two further lodges followed, but none survived the First World War.

Other new lodges formed prior to World War I was a lodge in Beirut under the Ottoman Grand Lodge, later the Grand Lodge of Turkey, and another under the National Grand Lodge of Egypt, formed around 1914. Several other Egyptian-warranted lodges were chartered thereafter, and after the First World War, these were formed into a District Grand Lodge. By the end of World War Two, these lodges were extinct, merged, or had changed jurisdictional authority.

=== Grand Lodge of Lebanon ===
The Grand Lodge of Free & Accepted Masons of Lebanon was established in 2018 by the Grand Lodge of New York. 3 lodges in the District Grand Lodge of Syria-Lebanon under the Grand Lodge of New York were granted a charter from the Grand Lodge of New York and William M. Sandone, Grand Master to form their own Grand Lodge.

In 2026, it was recognized by the Commission on Information for Recognition at the Conference of Grand Masters of Masons in North America, which includes 52 Grand Lodges from the United States, 10 in Canada, the State of York, Mexico and the American Canadian Grand Lodge of Germany.

However, the Grand Lodge has not been recognized by the United Grand Lodge of England or the Grand Lodge of Scotland or the Grand Lodge of Ireland.

=== District Grand Lodge of Syria-Lebanon under the Grand Lodge of New York ===
In 1955 the Grand Lodge of New York consecrated the District Grand Lodge of Syria-Lebanon on August 22, 1955, by Past Grand Master of the Grand Lodge of New York Charles W. Frossel, who flew to Lebanon for that purpose. The first lodge, Syrio-American Lodge No. 1, was consecrated in 1924. 11 lodges were chartered and consecrated in Lebanon, all of which remain active. One lodge was chartered in Syria in 1927, the Ibrahim El Khalil Lodge No. 4 in Damascus, but it went dormant after the 1967 war.

=== District Grand Lodge of Lebanon under Grand Lodge of Scotland ===
In 2013, the District Grand Lodge of Lebanon was formed under the auspices of the Grand Lodge of Scotland. Operating within its framework were originally six lodges, with 12 lodges as of 2026.

=== Lodges charted by the Grand Lodge of Washington, D.C. ===
In 2010, the Grand Lodge of Washington, D.C. chartered their first lodge in Lebanon, Phoenix Lodge No. 1001 in Al Fanar, Lebanon. In 2018, a French-speaking lodge under the name of Cadmus Lodge No. 1002 was also chartered, bringing the total number of lodges operating under the Grand Lodge of Washington, D.C. to two. A third one, Cedrus Libani No 1003 was established in 2022. In 2024, the charters for these three lodges were arrested.
