= Candidates of the 2018 Lebanese general election =

A total of 583 candidates contested the 2018 Lebanese general election, running on 77 lists.

== Candidates by electoral district ==
Incumbent parliamentarians marked in bold italic.

=== Beirut I (East Beirut) ===
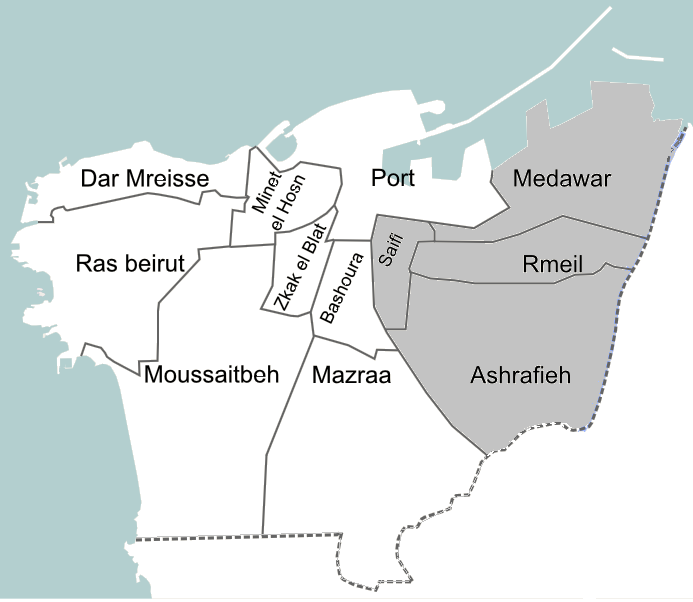
Beirut I electoral district

The Eastern first Beirut electoral district covers 4 quartiers (neighbourhoods) of the Lebanese capital: Achrafieh, Saifi, Rmeil and Medawar. The area is predominantly Christian; the largest community in the Beirut I electorate are Armenian Orthodox (28.33%). 19.2% are Greek Orthodox, 13.19% Maronite, 9.8% Greek Catholic, 9.76% Sunni, 5.57% Armenian Catholic, 3.95% Syriac Catholic, 3% Latin Catholics, 1.97% other Minorities groups, 2.88% Evangelicals, 1.99% Shia and 0.37% Druze or Alawite.

In first Beirut electoral district 5 lists were registered. After the split between the Future Movement and the Lebanese Forces, a joint list of the Free Patriotic Movement, the Armenian Revolutionary Federation (Tashnaq) and the Hunchaks was conceived ("Strong Beirut I") supported by the Future Movement. The Future Movement itself, however, stayed aloof from fielding candidates. The Lebanese Forces, together with the Kataeb Party, Ramgavars and Michel Pharaon, and with support from Antoun Sehnaoui, fielded their list under the label "Beirut I". Michelle Tueni fielded a third list, "We Are Beirut", being joined by incumbent Future MP Serge Torsarkissian.

For the Minorities seat the FPM fielded a Syriac Orthodox candidate, former Brigadier General Antoine Pano, whilst the Tueni list includes Latin Catholic candidate Rafic Bazerji, an independent from a family historically close to the National Liberal Party.

List		Armenian Orthodox, 3 seats			Maronite, 1 seat	Greek Orthodox, 1 seat	Greek Catholic, 1 seat	Armenian Catholic, 1 seat	Minorities, 1 seat
"Strong Beirut I"	Orange	Hakop Terzian (Tashnaq)	Alexander Matossian (Tashnaq)	**Sebouh Kalpakian** (Hunchak)	Massoud Achkar (Union for Lebanon)	Nicolas Chammas	Nicolas Sehnaoui (FPM)	Serg Gukhadarian (Tashnaq)	Antoine Pano (FPM)
"Beirut I"	Red	Carole Babikian	Avedis Datsian (Ramgavar)	Alina Kaloussian (Ramgavar)	**Nadim Gemayel** (Kataeb)	Emad Wakim (Lebanese Forces)	**Michel Pharaon**	Jean Talouzian	Riad Akel (Lebanese Forces)
"Kulluna Watani" (We are all National)	Turquoise	Paula Yacoubian (Sabaa)	Laury Haytayan (LiBaladi)	Levon Telvizian (LiBaladi)	Gilbert Doumit (LiBaladi)	Ziad Abs (Sah)	Lucien Bourjeily (You Stink)	Yorgui Teyrouz (LiBaladi)	Joumana Haddad (LiBaladi)
"We are Beirut"	Navy Blue	Seybou Makhjian			Georges Sfeir	Michelle Tueni		**Serge Torsarkissian**	Rafic Bazerji
"Loyalty to Beirut"	Green				Roger Choueiri	Robert Obeid		Antoune Qalaijian	Gina Chammas
ACE Project, Ministry of Interior and Municipalities

=== Beirut II (West Beirut) ===
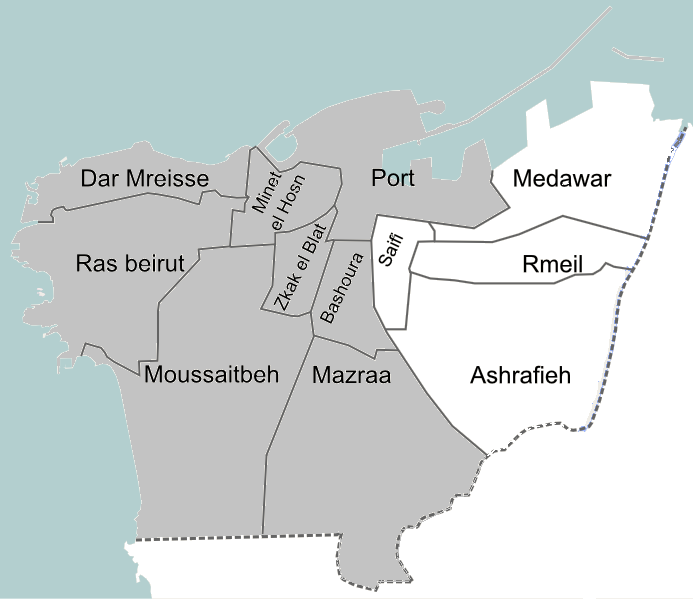
Beirut II electoral district

The Western second Beirut electoral district covers 8 quartiers (neighbourhoods) of the Lebanese capital: Ain El Mreisseh, Bachoura, Mazraa, Minet El Hosn, Moussaitbeh, Port, Ras Beirut and Zuqaq al-Blat. The electorate is predominantly Sunni (62.1%). 20.6% are Shia, 5% Greek Orthodox, 3.41% Minorities, 1.86% Maronite, 1.65% Armenian Orthodox, 1.63% Greek Catholic, 1.55% Druze, 1.31% Jews, 0.81% Evangelical (Protestant) and 0.03% Alawite.

In second Beirut electoral district 9 lists were registered. In the 2009 election, the Future Movement had won the election in West Beirut. But this time, a number of lists seeks to challenge the Future dominance over the Sunni electorate, "Beirut al-Watan" (alliance of al-Jamaa al-Islamiah and Al Liwaa newspaper editor Salah Salam), "Beiruti Opposition" (fielded by Ashraf Rifi), "Lebnan Herzen", "We are All Beirut" and "Dignity of Beirut" (led by former judge Khaled Hammoud).

The erstwhile March 8 bloc split into two lists. Hezbollah, Amal, Al-Ahbash and the Free Patriotic Movement fielded the "Unity of Beirut" list, whilst the People's Movement and Al-Mourabitoun fielded the "Voice of the People" list. Omar Ghandour, candidate of the Islamic Action Front, prominent businessman and former president of the Nejmeh Sporting Club, was named president of "Unity of Beirut" list. The SSNP faction of Ali Haidar fielded a candidate on the "Voice of the People" list. Naamat Badruddin, also on the "Voice of the People" list was a leader during the 2015 trash protest movement.

Under the previous electoral law the Future Movement could easily win landslides in West Beirut. But under the new electoral law analysts argued that the Future Movement could lose a number of seats. Apart from the Hezbollah-Amal-FPM list (expected to win the Shia vote), the main perceived challengers to the Future Movement were the "Beirut al-Watan" list and the "Lebnan Herzen" list of prominent businessman Fouad Makhzoumi. Nevertheless, the Beirut al-Watan list included several figures close to the Hariri family and Salam pledged to support the "Sunni za'im" Hariri to remain Prime Minister of Lebanon.

Prior to the deadline to register lists, the Lebanese Democratic Party announced the withdrawal of its candidate for the Druze seat. Likewise the Lebanese People's Congress, which had initially intended to field Samir Kneo on the Amal-Hezbollah list, withdrew from the race.

List		Sunni, 6 seats						Shia, 2 seats		Druze, 1 seat	Greek Orthodox, 1 seat	Evangelical, 1 seat
"Future for Beirut"	Blue	**Saad Hariri** (Future)	**Tamam Salam** (Future)	**Nohad Machnouk** (Future)	Roula Tabash Jaroudi (Future)	Rabea Hassouna (Future)	Zaher Eido (Future)	Ali Al Shaer (Future)	**Ghazi Yusuf** (Future)	Faisal Al Sayegh (PSP)	Nazih Najem (Future)	**Bassam Chab** (Future)
"Beiruti Opposition"	Burgundi	Ziad Itani	Akram Sinno	Amer Iskandarani	Safiyah Zaza	Yassine Kadado		Lina Hamdan		Zeina Mansour	Bchara Khairallah	
"Unity of Beirut"	Yellow	Adnan Trabelsi (Al-Ahbash)	Omar Ghandour (Islamic Action Front)	Mohammed Baasiri				Amin Shri (Hezbollah)	Mohammad Khawaja (Amal)			Edgar Trabelsi (FPM)
"Lebnan Herzen"	Red	Fouad Makhzoumi (National Dialogue Party)	Marouf Itani	Rana Chemaitelly	Mahmoud Kareidiya	Saaduddin Hassan Khaled	Issam Barghout	Yousef Beydoun		Zeina Mounzer	Khalil Broummana	Nadim Costa
"Voice of the People"	Gray	Ibrahim Halabi (People's Movement)	Youssef Tabash (Mourabitoun)	Firas Manaimna	Hanan Osman	Roula Houry	Faten Zain	Naamat Badruddin		Hani Fayyad (SSNP (Intifada))	Omar Wakim (People's Movement)	Nabil Sebaaly
"Beirut al-Watan"	Navy Blue	Salah Salaam	Moustafa Banbouk (Al-Waqie Movement)	Bashar Qowatli	**Imad Hout** (al-Jama'a al-Islamiah)	Saad Wazzan	Nabil Bader	Salwa Khalil	Ibrahim Chamseddine	Saeed Halabi	George Chaqir	Dalal Rahbani
"Dignity of Beirut"	Green	Khaled Hamoud	Mohammad Qadi	Jihad Matar	Hanan Sha'ar	Khuloud Wattar	Muhammad Shatila	Ali Sbeiti		Raja Zuhairi	Mikhael Mikhael	
"Birutah al-Mustaqilin"	Purple	Walid Shatila	Abdul Karim Itani	Abdul Rahman Gilani	Khalid Hanqir	Khalid Mumtaz		Wisam Akush	Jihad Hammoud	Andera Zouheiri	Leon Sioufi	Fadi Zarazir
"We are All Beirut"	Orange	Ibrahim Mneimneh	Hassan Faysal Sano	Nadine Itani	Marwan Tibi	Fatima Moshref (Sabaa)		Naji Kodeih			Zeina Majdalani	Nihad Yazbek
Source: Al-Modon, ACE Project, Ministry of Interior and Municipalities

=== Bekaa I (Zahle) ===
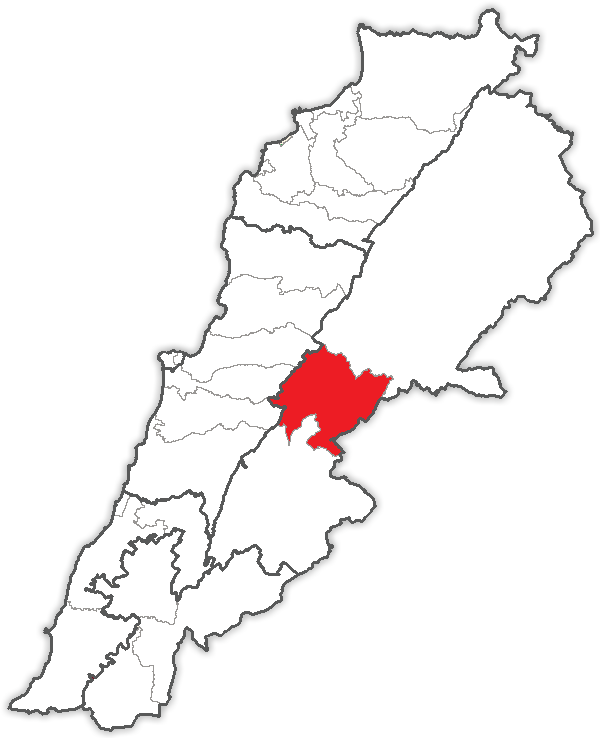
Bekaa I electoral district, covering the Zahle District

The electorate in the first Bekaa electoral district is predominantly Christian. Ahead of the 2018 elections, electoral district had 172,555 registered voters; 28.32% Sunni, 15.96% Shi, 0.53% Druze, 18.72% Greek Catholic, 15.68% Maronite, 9.54% Greek Orthodox, 4.99% Armenian Orthodox, 3.85% Syriac Orthodox and Syriac Catholic, 1.07% Armenian Catholic, 0.78% Evangelical and 0.57% from other sects.

In the Zahle electoral district 5 lists were registered. An alliance of Free Patriotic Movement, Future Movement, Tashnaq and independents was announced with the candidature name "Zahle for All". Lebanese Forces and the Kataeb Party fielded the "Zahle is Our Cause" list. There were also the "Popular Bloc" list led by Mariam Skaff, "Zahle Options and Decisions" led by Nicolas Fattouch (including a Hezbollah candidate) and the civil society list Kulluna Watani.

Rifi did not field a list in Zahle, as he failed to reach an alliance with Kataeb and Lebanese Forces on the matter.

List		Greek Catholic, 2 seats		Maronite, 1 seat	Greek Orthodox, 1 seat	Sunni, 1 seat	Shia, 1 seat	Armenian Orthodox, 1 seat
"Zahle for All"	Navy Blue	Michel Skaff	Michel George Daher	Salim Aoun (FPM)	Assaad Nakad	**Asim Araji** (Future)	Nizar Dalloul (Future)	Marie-Jeanne Bilezikjian
"Zahle is Our Cause"	Red	George Okeis (Lebanese Forces)	Michel Fattouch	**Elie Maroni** (Kataeb)	César Maalouf (Pro-Lebanese Forces)	Muhammad Ali Mita	Amer Sabouri	Boughous Kordian
"Popular Bloc"	Green	Myriam Skaff (Popular Bloc)	Nicola Amorri (Popular Bloc)	Paul Charbel (Popular Bloc)	Nicola Saba (Popular Bloc)	Ahmed Al-Ajoumi (Popular Bloc)	Osama Salhab (Popular Bloc)	George Bushikian (Popular Bloc)
"Zahle Options and Decisions"	Purple	**Nicolas Fattouch**		Khalil Hrawi	Nassif Al-Tini (SSNP)	Wajih Araji	Anwar Jomaa (Hezbollah)	Eddie Demirjian
"Kulluna Watani" (We are all National)	Turquoise	Ghassan Maalouf (Sabaa)		Hanna Habib (Sabaa)	Vanda Chedid (Green)	Houd Taaïmi (Sabaa)	Mohammad Hassan	
Source: Al-Liwaa, ACE Project, Ministry of Interior and Municipalities

=== Bekaa II (West Bekaa-Rachaya) ===
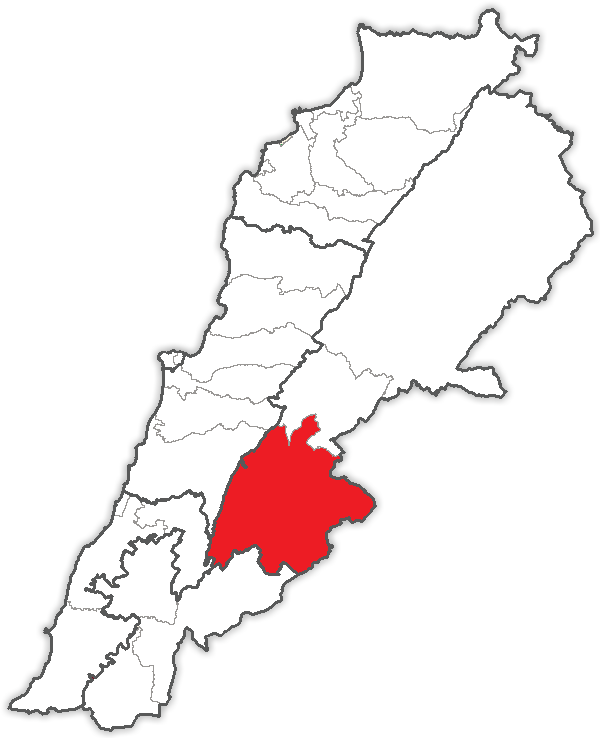
The Bekaa II electoral district, covering the West Bekaa and the Rashaya districts

In the second Bekaa electoral district, nearly half of the electorate is Sunni (48.8%). 14.8% of the electorate is Druze, 14.7% Shia, 7.42% Greek Catholic, 7.22% Maronite and 7.16% Greek Orthodox.

In the West Bekaa-Rachaya electoral district 3 lists were registered. The Future Movement and the Progressive Socialist Party formed a joint list. Notably this list included Mohammed Qar'awi, owner of the Bekaa Hospital, a personality previously linked to the March 8 Alliance. Amin Wahbi, founder and leader of the Democratic Left Movement was included on the Future list.

The "Best Tomorrow" list is mainly backed by the Amal Movement. In the end the Free Patriotic Movement did not join the Amal-sponsored list, leaving Greek Orthodox candidate Elie Ferzli to join it as an individual.

TV presenter Maguy Aoun is heading a third list, organized by civil society elements.

The Lebanese Forces had tried to form a list with Ashraf Rifi to contest the election, but such a list did not materialize. Likewise, the Lebanese Democratic Party opted to withdrawal its candidate Dr. Nizar Zaki.

List		Sunni, 2 seats		Shia, 1 seat	Druze, 1 seat	Maronite, 1 seat	Greek Orthodox, 1 seat
"Future for West Bekaa"	Blue	**Ziad Qadri** (Future)	Mohammed Qar'awi (Future)	**Amin Wahbi** (Future)	**Wael Abou Faour** (PSP)	Henri Chadid	Ghassan Skaf
"Best Tomorrow"	Navy Blue	Abdel Rahim Murad (Union Party)		Mohammad Nasrallah (Amal)	Faisal Daoud (Lebanese Arab Struggle Movement)	Naji Ghanem	Elie Ferzli
"Civil Society"	Green	Faisal Rahal	Ala Shamali	Ali Sobh		Maguy Aoun	Joseph Ayoub
ACE Project, Ministry of Interior and Municipalities

=== Bekaa III (Baalbek–Hermel) ===
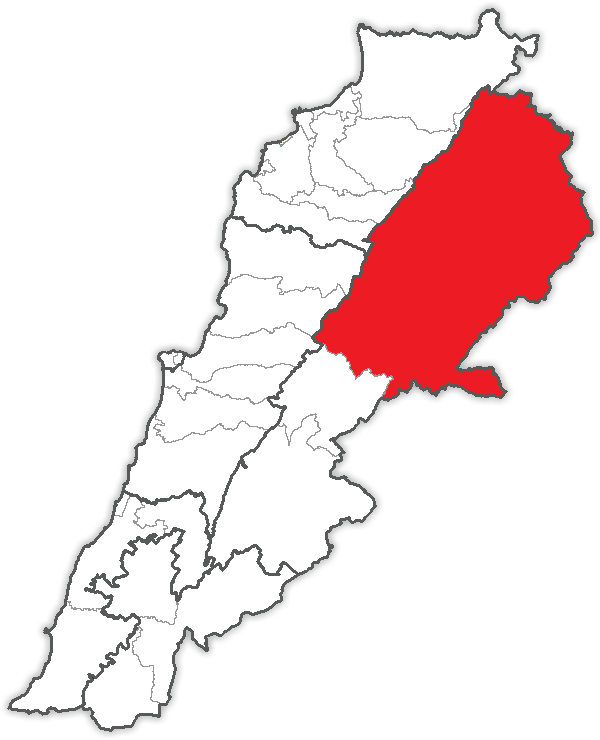
The Bekaa III electoral district, covering the Baalbek-Hermel Governorate

The electorate in the electoral district is predominantly Shia (73.3%). 13.3% are Sunni, 7.35% Maronite, 5.36% Greek Catholic and 0.72% Greek Orthodox. In Baalbek–Hermel electoral district 5 lists were registered. The "Hope and Loyalty" list gathers Hezbollah, Amal and the Syrian Social Nationalist Party. Its main challenger is expected to be the "Dignity and Development" list of the Lebanese Forces and the Future Movement. The Free Patriotic Movement had tried to form a list together with former speaker Hussein el-Husseini, but after el-Husseini pulled out from the electoral fray the alliance broke down and resulted in two separate lists: the "Development and Change" list and the "Independent" list. The Free Patriotic Movement candidates joined the list led by the former regional secretary of the Baath Party, Faiz Shukr.

List		Shia, 6 seats						Sunni, 2 seats		Maronite, 1 seat	Greek Catholic, 1 seat
"Hope and Loyalty"	Green-Yellow	Jamil El Sayyed	**Hussein el Hage Hassan** (Hezbollah)	Ihab Hamadeh (Hezbollah)	**Ali Mekdad** (Hezbollah)	Ibrahim Moussawi (Hezbollah)	**Ghazi Zaiter** (Amal)	Younis Rifai (Al-Ahbash)	**Elwalid Succariyeh**	**Emile Rahme** (Solidarity Party)	Albert Mansour (Pro-SSNP)
"Dignity and Development"	Red	Yehya Chammas	Rifaat Masri	Mohammad Hajj Sleiman	Ghaleb Yaghi	Khodr Tlayss	Mohammad Hamiye	Bakr Hojeiry (Future)	Hussein Solh (Future)	Antoine Habchi (Lebanese Forces)	Selim Kallas
"Development and Change"	Grey	Abbas Yaghi	Ali Zuaiter	Ali Hamada				Abdallah Chall	Samih Ezzeddine	Chawki Fakhri	Siham Antoune (LCP)
"Independent"	Pink	Ghada Assaf (FPM)	Faiz Shukr	Mehdi Zogheib	Saad Hamadeh	Faisal Husseini	Fadi Younis	Ahmed Bayan	Mohamed Fleeti	Sandrella Merhej	Michel Emile Daher (FPM)
"National Cedars"	Gold	Mohammad Ghassan Moustapha Chall	Khaldoun Chreif	Abbas Assaf	Mohammad Khalil Raad	Fouad Maoula	Hamad Dib	Adel Mohammad Bayan	Waed Succariyeh	Leila Tannoury	Saadallah Ardo (Kataeb)
ACE Project, Ministry of Interior and Municipalities

=== Mount Lebanon I (Byblos–Kesrwan) ===
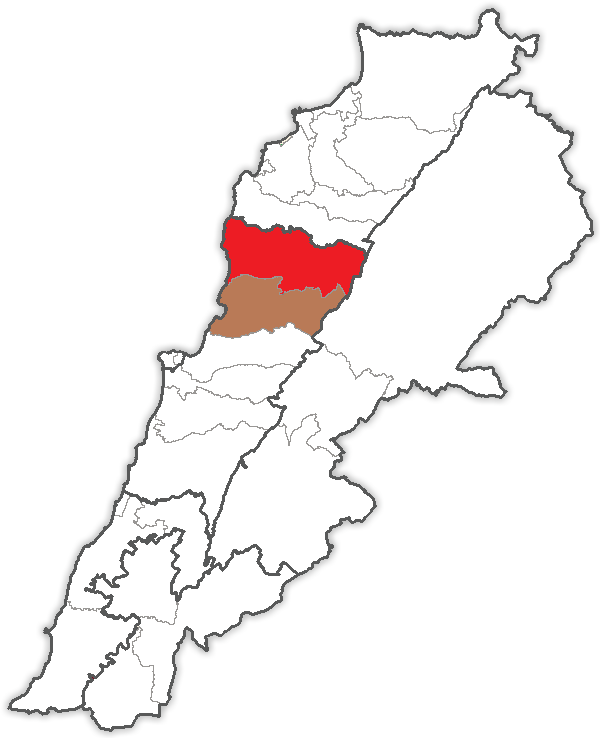
The Mount Lebanon I electoral district. The electoral district consists of two minor districts, the Byblos (in red, covering Byblos district) and Kesrwan (in brown, covering Kesrwan district).

In Byblos–Kesrwan electoral district 5 lists were registered. The lists in the fray are the "Strong Lebanon" (supported by Free Patriotic Movement), the "National Solidarity" (Hezbollah), the "Anna al-Qarar" list (alliance between Kataeb Party, Fares Souhaid, Farid Heikal Al Khazen and independents, supported by Marada Movement), the "Clear Change" list (supported by Lebanese Forces) and the "Kulluna Watani" (We are all National) list.

In difference with previous elections, FPM and Hezbollah did not join forces on a common list. Hezbollah fielded its own list, with a Shia candidate (Hussein Zuaitar) from Baalbek. The Alliance National list included the former Telecommunications Minister Jean Louis Cardahi and dissident FPM politician Bassam Hachem, Hezbollah candidate and 4 other independents.

The FPM list was led by General Chamel Roukoz, with World Maronite Foundation president Neemat Frem, former minister Ziad Baroud and former parliamentarian Mansour al-Bon, amongst others.

The Kataeb-Souhaid supported list sought to include personalities from civil society. It included former National Bloc general secretary Jean Hawat. There was resistance from Kataeb side to field incumbent parliamentarians Youssef Khalil and Gilberte Zouein, since they were linked to the Change and Reform Bloc.

The "Kulluna Watani" (We are all National) list included former minister Youssef Salame.

The electorate is predominantly Christian; Maronites make up 82.1% of the electorate, 10.7% Shia, 1.91% Greek Orthodox, 1.4% Armenian Orthodox, 1.32% Sunni, 1.32% Greek Catholic and 1.26% other Christian communities.

List		Maronite (Byblos, 2 seats)		Shia (Byblos, 1 seat)	Maronite (Kesrwan, 5 seats)				
"Strong Lebanon"	Purple	**Simon Abi Rumia** (FPM)	**Walid Khoury**	Rabih Awad	Chamel Roukoz	Neemat Frem	Roger Azar (FPM)	Ziad Baroud	Mansour al-Bon
"National Solidarity"	Gray	Jean-Louis Cardahi	Bassam Hachem	Hussein Zuaitar (Hezbollah)	Carlos Abu Nader	Zeina Kallab	Michel Keyrouz	Joseph Zayek	Joseph Zougheib
"Anna al-Qarar"	Navy Blue	Fares Souhaid	Jean Hawat	Moustapha Husseini	Farid Heikal Al Khazen	Shaker Salameh (Kataeb)	**Youssef Khalil**	**Gilberte Zouein**	Yolanda Khoury
"Clear Change	Red	Ziad Hawat (Lebanese Forces)	Fady Rouhana Sakr	Mahmoud Awad	Chawki Daccache (Lebanese Forces)	Rock Mehanna	Patricia Elias	Numan Murad	Ziad Khalifa (NLP)
"Kulluna Watani" (We are all National)	Turquoise	Nadim Souhaid	Rania Bassil (Sabaa)	Mohamed Mekdad (LCP)	Youssef Salame (Idendity and Sovereignty Gathering)	Dori Daou (Sabaa)	Josephine Zogheib (MMFD)		
ACE Project, Ministry of Interior and Municipalities

=== Mount Lebanon II (Metn) ===
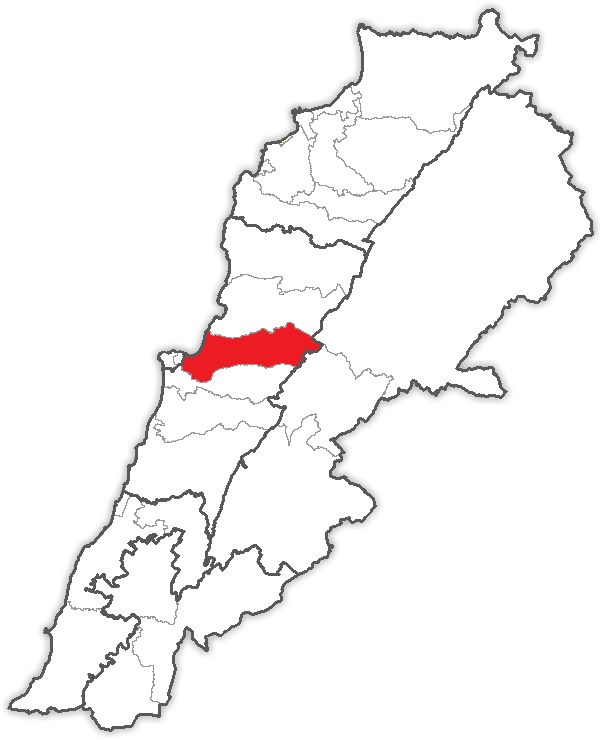
The Mount Lebanon II electoral district, covering the Metn district

Mount Lebanon II is a predominantly Christian electoral district; 44.8% of the electorate is Maronite, 14.6% Greek Orthodox, 14.3% Armenian Orthodox, 9.83% Greek Catholic, 3.86% Armenian Catholic and 6.28% other Christian communities. 3.03% of the electorate is Shia, 1.88% Sunni and 1.38% Druze.

In Metn electoral district 5 lists were registered. Michel Murr fielded the list "Metn Loyalty". The Kataeb Party fielded its list under the label "Pulse Metn" together with the National Liberal Party and civil society personalities, the Lebanese Forces and allies contest under the label "Metn Heart of Lebanon" and an alliance of the Free Patriotic Movement-Syrian Social Nationalist Party-Tashnaq fielded the "Strong Metn" list.

The Communist Party had been in discussions with civil society activists on forming a list labelled "Nawar al-Metn", but the initiative did not materialize.

List		Maronite, 4 seats				Greek Orthodox, 2 seats		Greek Catholic, 1 seat	Armenian Orthodox, 1 seat
"Pulse Metn"	Green	**Samy Gemayel** (Kataeb)	Elias Hankache (Kataeb)	Nada Gharib (Green)	Joseph Karam (NLP)	Mazen Skaf	Violette Ghazal Balaa	Mikhail Ramouz	Yeghisheh Andonian
"Strong Metn"	Orange	**Ibrahim Kanaan** (FPM)	Corinne Achkar	Sarkis Sarkis	Ghassan Achkar (SSNP)	**Ghassan Mukhaiber**	Elias Bousaab (FPM)	**Edgar Maalouf** (FPM)	**Hagop Pakradounian** (Tashnaq)
"Metn Loyalty"	Navy Blue	Najwa Azar	Mellad El-Sabali (SSNP (Intifada))	Sharbel Abu Joudeh		**Michel Murr**		George Abboud	
"Metn Heart of Lebanon"	Red	Eddy Abillammaa (Lebanese Forces)	Razi Haj	Chucri Moukarzel	Gisèle Hachem Zard	Lina Moukheiber	Jessica Azar	Michel Mecattaf	Ara Koyounian (Ramgavar)
"Kulluna Watani" (We are all National)	Turquoise	Emile Kanaan	Nadine Mousa	Adeeb Tohmah	Victoria el-Khoury Zwein (Sabaa)	Georges Rahbani (Sabaa)		Charbel Nahas (MMFD)	
ACE Project, Ministry of Interior and Municipalities

=== Mount Lebanon III (Baabda) ===
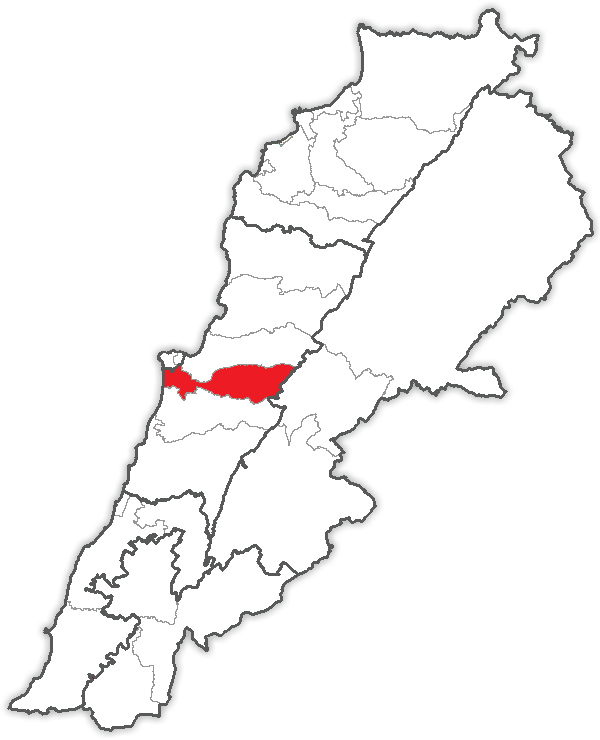
The Mount Lebanon III electoral district, covering the Baabda district

In Baabda electoral district 4 lists were registered. Whilst the Free Patriotic Movement and the March 8 coalition had gone separate ways in most electoral districts, they managed to form a joint list in Baabda under the label "National Reconciliation". The other main list in the fray is the "Unity and Development of Baabda" list, an alliance of the Progressive Socialist Party, the Lebanese Forces, independents and Salah Harakeh, supported by the Future Movement. There are also two civil society lists. The "Together for Baabda" list was presented by Kataeb chief Sami Gemayel and NLP chief Dory Chamoun on March 3, 2018, a list including civil society activists and environmentalists. It includes the founder of Terre-Liban and the Lebanese Ecological Movement, a platform of NGOs, Paul Abi Rached as one of its candidates.

36.8% of the electorate is Maronite, 25.2% Shia, 17.6% Druze, 7.61% Greek Orthodox, 6.11% Sunni, 4.6% Greek Catholic and 2.14% belong to other Christian communities.

List		Maronite, 3 seats			Shia, 2 seats		Druze, 1 seat
"National Accord"	Orange	**Hikmat Dib** (FPM)	**Alain Aoun** (FPM)	**Naji Gharios** (FPM)	**Ali Ammar** (Hezbollah)	Fadi Alame (Amal)	Souhail Awar (LDP)
"Unity and Development of Baabda"	Red	Cynthia Asmar	Joseph Adaïmi	Pierre Bou Assi (Lebanese Forces)	Salah Harakeh		Hadi Abou el-Hosn (PSP)
"Kulluna Watani" (We are all National)	Turquoise	Joseph Wanis (Mouttahidoun)	Ziad Akel	Marie Claude Helou (Sabaa)	Ali Darwish (MMFD)	Wasef Harakeh (Popular Observatory)	Rania Masri (MMFD)
"Together for Baabda"	Green	Paul Abi Rached	Elie Gharios (endorsed by NLP)	Ramzi Bou Khaled (Kataeb)	Said Alameh	Olfat Sabeh	Ajwad Ayach
ACE Project, Ministry of Interior and Municipalities

=== Mount Lebanon IV (Aley–Chouf) ===
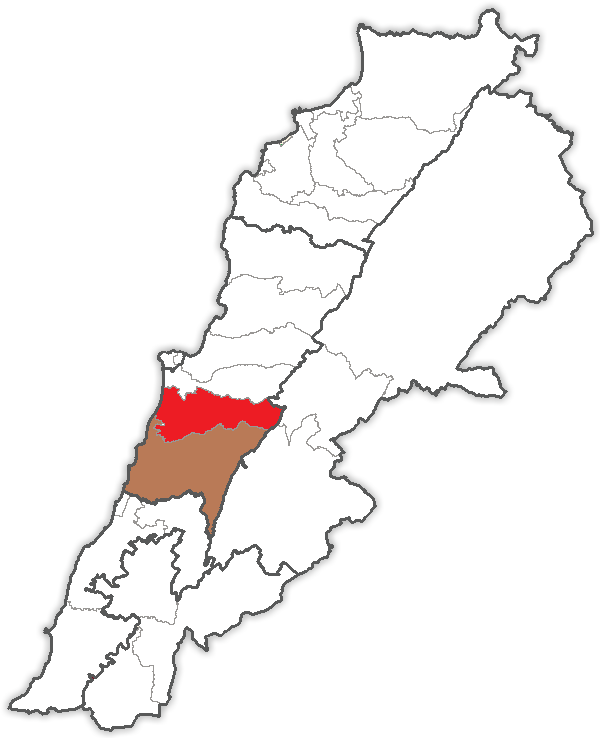
The Mount Lebanon IV electoral district. The electoral district consists of two minor districts, the Aley (in red, covering Aley district) and Chouf (in brown, covering Chouf district).

In Aley–Chouf electoral district 6 lists were registered. 40.5% of the electorate is Druze, 27% Maronite, 18.7% Sunni, 5.18% Greek Catholic, 5.14% Greek Orthodox, 2.6% Shia and 0.91% belongs to other Christian communities.

The battle was expected to be mainly between two lists: the "Reconciliation" (Progressive Socialist Party-Future Movement-Lebanese Forces) list and the "Mountain Pledge" (Lebanese Democratic Party-Free Patriotic Movement-Syrian Social Nationalist Party) list. The remaining lists were the "Free Decision" (Kataeb Party and National Liberal Party) list, the "National Unity" list of Wiam Wahhab (former Minister, ex-LDP), the "Civic" list and the "Kulluna Watani" (We are all National) list.

Towards the end of February the Democratic Renewal Movement candidate Antoine Haddad announced his withdrawal from the race.

List		Druze (Aley, 2 seats)		Maronite (Aley, 2 seats)		Greek Orthodox (Aley, 1 seat)
"Reconciliation"	Red	**Akram Chehayeb** (PSP)		**Henri Helou** (Democratic Gathering)	Raji Saad	Anis Nasar (Lebanese Forces)
"Mountain Pledge"	Green-Orange	**Talal Arslan** (LDP)		César Abi Khalil (FPM)	Imad Hajj	Elias Hanna (FPM)
"Free Decision"	Navy Blue	Sami Ramah		Teodora Bajani (Kataeb)	Antoine Bou Melhab (NLP)	
"National Unity"	Green	Shafiq Salama Radwan	Khaled Aref Khadaj (Arab Unification Party)	Souhail Khalil Bajani		Walid Anis Khairallah
"Civic"	Silver	Mark Daou		Fadi Khoury		
"Kulluna Watani" (We are all National)	Turquoise	Imad Al Qadi (Lihaqqi)	Alaa Al Sayegh (Lihaqqi)	Karl Bou Malham (Lihaqqi)		Zoya Jureidini (LCP)
ACE Project, Ministry of Interior and Municipalities

List		Maronite (Chouf, 3 seats)			Druze (Chouf, 2 seats)		Sunni (Chouf, 2 seats)		Greek Catholic (Chouf, 1 seat)
"Reconciliation"	Red	Georges Adwan (Lebanese Forces)	Ghattas Khoury (Future)	Naji Bustani	Taymour Jumblatt (PSP)	**Marwan Hamadeh** (PSP)	**Bilal Abdullah** (PSP)	**Mohammed Hajjar** (Future)	**Nima Tomeh** (Democratic Gathering)
"Mountain Pledge"	Green-Orange	Mario Aoun (FPM)	Farid Bustani	Samir Aoun (SSNP)	Marwan Halawi (LDP)	Mazen Abu Dergham (LDP)	Tareq Khatib (FPM)	Ali Al Hajj	Ghassan Atallah (FPM)
"Free Decision"	Navy Blue	Camille Dory Chamoun (NLP)	Joseph Eid (Kataeb)	Da'id Qazi (NLP)	Sami Hamada	Elhan Farahat	Mazin Shabu	Rafat Shaaban	Ghassan Moghbab
"National Unity"	Green	Ziad Antoine Choueiri	As'ad Edmon Abu Jouda		Wiam Wahhab (Arab Unification Party)		Elias Abdel Salam Baraj	Zahir Khatib (Toilers League)	Abu Rajaili
"Civic"	Silver	Eliane Qazi	Elias Gharib	Marwan Matani	Rami Hamadeh		Maya Terro		Chukri Haddad
"Kulluna Watani" (We are all National)	Turquoise	Ghada Marouni Eid (Sabaa)	George Aoun		Rania Ghaith (Lihaqqi)	Maher Abu Shaqra (Lihaqqi)	Mohammed Sami Hajjar	Mazen Nasereddine (Green)	Antoine Fawaz (LCP)
ACE Project, Ministry of Interior and Municipalities

=== North I (Akkar) ===
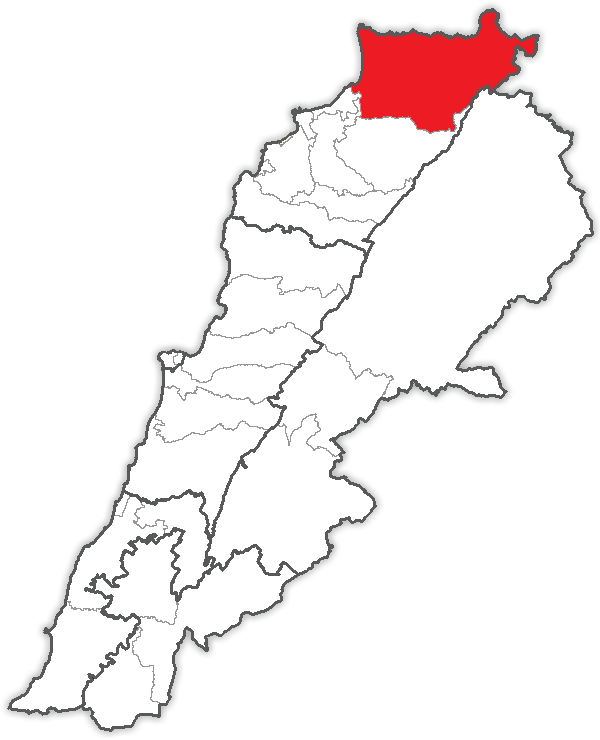
The North I electoral district, covering the Akkar Governorate

In Akkar 6 lists were registered. The Future Movement opted for a list of its own (with Lebanese Forces candidate Qatisha as candidate for a Greek Orthodox seat). There is also a list supported by March 8 coalition "The Decision for Akkar" (headed by ex-MP Wajih Barini, in alliance with the Marada Movement and the Arab Democratic Party), the "Decision of Akkar" list, the "Strong Akkar" list (Free Patriotic Movement, al-Jamaa al-Islamiah, pro-Future independents), "Sovereign Lebanon" list (led by Ashraf Rifi) and the "Women of Akkar" list.

The electorate is predominantly Sunni (67.5%). 14.7% of the electorate is Greek Orthodox, 10.9% Maronite, 4.97% Alawite, 1.05% Shia, 0.62% Greek Catholic and 0.29% from other Christian communities.

List		Sunni, 3 seats			Greek Orthodox, 2 seats		Maronite, 1 seat	Alawite, 1 seat
"Future of Akkar"	Blue	Waleed Wajih Barini (Future)	Mohammad Tarek Talal Maaribi (Future)	Mohammed Suleiman (Future)	Wahbi Qatisha (Lebanese Forces)	Jean Moussa (Future)	**Hadi Hobeiche** (Future)	**Khodr Habib** (Future)
"Decision for Akkar"	Green	Wajih Barini (Akkari People's Gathering)	Adnan Marab	Hussein Masri	Emile Abboud (SSNP)	Karim Rassi (Marada)	Michel Antonios Daher	Hussein Salloum
"Decision of Akkar"	Red	Kamal Khazal	Ali Omar (Resistance Movement)	Basem Khalid			George Nader	
"Strong Akkar"	Gold	Mohammad Yahya	Mohamed Shadeed (Al-Jama'a al-Islamiyya)	Mahmoud Hadara	**Riad Rahal**	Asaad Dergham (FPM)	Jamie Jabbour (FPM)	Mustafa Ali Hussein (Lebanese People's Movement)
"Sovereign Lebanon"	Red	Ibrahim Maraab	Bader Ismail	Ahmed Jowhar	Elie Saad	Joseph Wehbe	Ziad Bitar	Mohammed Rustam
"Women of Akkar"	Pink	Rola Murad	Suad Salah	Ghoulay Assaad	Nidal Skaf		Mary Khoury	
Source: Saida City, Al-Modon, An-Nahar Ministry of Interior and Municipalities

=== North II (Tripoli–Minnieh–Dennieh) ===
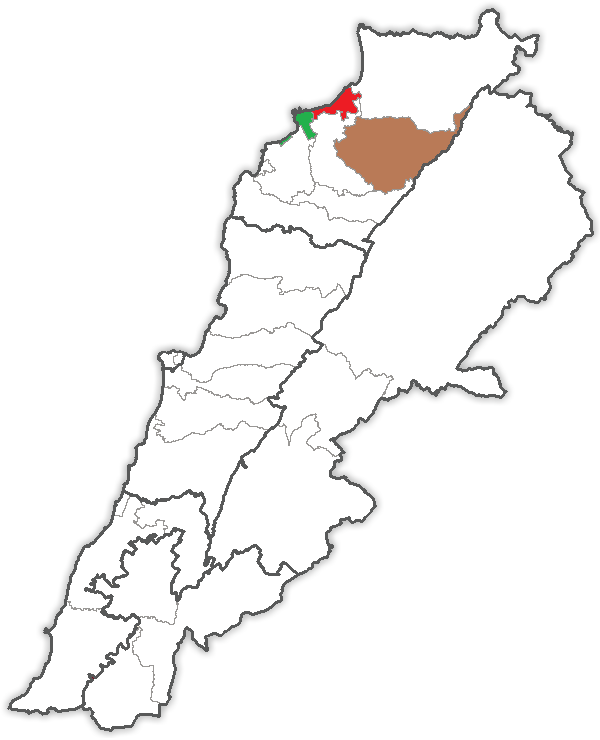
The North II electoral district, covering the Tripoli and Minnieh–Dennieh districts. The North II electoral district is divided into 3 minor districts: Tripoli (in green), Minnieh (in red) and Dennieh (in brown).

Under the previous electoral law, Tripoli and Minnieh-Dennieh constituted two different constituencies. The electorate is predominantly Sunni (82.91%), with significant minorities of Greek Orthodox (6.24%), Alawites (6.04%) and Maronites (3.5%). 0.51% of the electorate are Armenian Orthodox, 0.32% Armenian Catholics and 0.59% belong to other Christian communities.

With the new election law in place, the heavyweights of Tripoli politics went in different directions. Justifying the decision to head to the polls alone, the Future Movement general secretary Ahmed Hariri stated that "[w]e will form our own list because we came to understand that a lot of people had taken advantage of us...". All in all, 8 lists were registered in the second northern electoral district; the "Determination" list of former Prime Minister Najib Mikati, the Future Movement list, a list led by Ashraf Rifi, the "National Dignity" list (alliance between Faisal Karami and Jihad Samad, with participation of Al-Ahbash and Marada Movement), the "People's Decision" list (alliance between Free Patriotic Movement and Kamal Kheir, joined by independents), the "Kulluna Watani" (We are all National) list (Sabaa Party, Movement of Citizens in the State, Socialist Arab Lebanon Vanguard Party, Resistance Movement and independents), the "Independent Decision" list (alliance between al-Jamaa al-Islamiah, ex-parliamentarian Mesbah Ahdab and independents) and the "Independent Civil Society" List (independents). Mohammad Safadi opted to stay out of the electoral race, calling for support to the Future list. Safadi announced his decision at a press conference at the Safadi Cultural Center.

In Dennieh, the 28-year old Sami Fatfat overtook his father Ahmad Fatfat's mantle as the Future Movement candidate.

Mikati launched his "Determination" list at an electoral meeting at the Quality Inn Hotel in Tripoli on March 18, 2018. Amongst his candidates were former minister Jean Obeid and Nicolas Nahas and incumbent Future parliamentarian Kazim Kheir. Kheir was denied the Minnieh spot on the Future Movement list, a move that pushed him to join the Mikati list instead.

List		Sunni (Tripoli, 5 seats)					Maronite (Tripoli, 1 seat)	Greek Orthodox (Tripoli, 1 seat)	Alawite (Tripoli, 1 seat)	Sunni (Dennieh, 2 seats)		Sunni (Minnieh, 1 seat)
"Future for the North"	Blue	**Mohammad Kabbara** (Future)	**Samir Jisr** (Future)	**Dima Jamali** (Future)	Chadi Nachabe (Future)	Walid Sawalhi (Future)	George Bkassini (Future)	Nima Mahfoud (Future)	Leila Chahoud (Future)	**Sami Fatfat** (Future)	Qassem Abdel Aziz (Future)	**Osman Alameddine** (Future)
"National Dignity"	Green	Faisal Karami (Dignity Movement)	Taha Naji (Al-Ahbash)	Mohammed Safouh Yakan (National Gathering)	Abdel Nasser Masri (Lebanese People's Congress)	Ayman Nouruddin Omar		Rafli Anton Diab (Marada)	Ahmed Mahmoud Omran	**Jihad Samad**		Adel Zreika (Dignity Movement)
"Sovereign Lebanon"	Red	Ashraf Rifi	Khaled Tadmori	Mohammed Walid Qamaruddin	Mohamed Salhab	Ali Ayoubi	Halim Zani	George Jalad	Badr Eid	Ragheb Raad	Oussama Amoun	Waleed Masri
"Determination"	Purple	**Najib Mikati** (Azm Movement)	Rashid Mokhtam (Azm Movement)	Mohamed Nadim Jisr (Azm Movement)	Tawfiq Sultan (Azm Movement)	Mirfat Hawz (Azm Movement)	Jean Obeid (Azm Movement)	Nicolas Nahas (Azm Movement)	Alawi Darwish (Azm Movement)	Mohammed Fadhil (Azm Movement)	Jihad Yusuf (Azm Movement)	**Kazim Kheir** (Azm Movement)
"Independent Decision"	Grey	Mesbah Ahdab	Waseem Alwan (al-Jama'a al-Islamiah)	Nariman Jamal			Tony Khalifa	Menzeh Sawan	Hisham Ibrahim (Al Moaie)	Ali Farouk Samad	Abdul Salam Trad	Mohamed Ahmed
"People's Decision"	Orange	Khalid Roumieh					Tony Maroni (FPM)	Nastas Koshary	Mahmoud Shehadeh	Ahmed Shandab	Ali Hermoush	Kamal Kheir
"Independent Civil Society"	Yellow	Heba Naja	Jamal Badawi					Fadi Jamal	Hassan Hassan Khalil	Samah Arja	Ayman Jamal	Abdullah Rifai
"Kulluna Watani" (We are all National)	Turqouise	Nariman Chamaa (MMFD)	Yehia Mawloud	Mohammad Monzer Maaliki (Lebanon Vanguard)	Wathek Moukaddam	Malek Moulawi (Sabaa)	Moussa Khoury (MMFD)	Farah Issa (Sabaa)	Zeinelddine Dib		Ahmad Douhaiby	Dany Othman (Sabaa)
Source: Al-Modon Ministry of Interior and Municipalities

=== North III (Bcharre–Zghorta–Batroun–Koura) ===
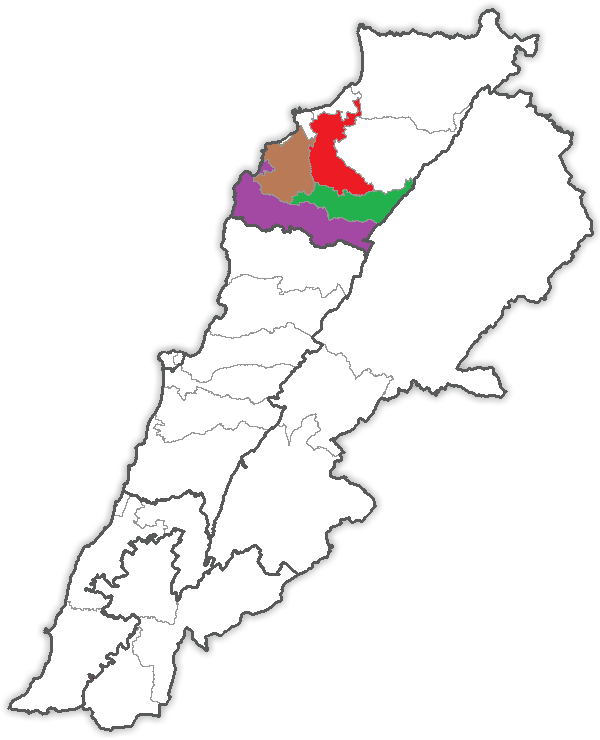
The North III electoral district, divided into 4 minor districts, each corresponding to a homonymous district: Batroun (purple), Bcharre (green), Koura (brown) and Zgharta (red).

In third northern electoral district 4 lists were registered. The "Strong North" list, headed by Gebran Bassil, gathers the Free Patriotic Movement, the Independence Movement, the Future Movement, the "Strong Republic Pulse" gathers the Lebanese Forces, the Kataeb Party and the Democratic Left Movement, the "With Us for the North and Lebanon", gathering the Marada Movement, the Syrian Social Nationalist Party and Boutros Harb whilst the civil society list "Kulluna Watani" (We are all National) gathers the Movement of Citizens in the State, Sabaa Party and Sah.

The electorate is predominantly Christian; 68.1% are Maronite, 20.7% Greek Orthodox, 8.94% Sunni, 0.93% Shia, 0.73% Greek Catholic, 0.38% from other Christian communities and 0.24% Alawite.

List		Maronite (Batroun, 2 seats)		Maronite (Bcharre, 2 seats)		Maronite (Zgharta, 3 seats)			Greek Orthodox (Koura, 3 seats)		
"Strong North"	Brown	**Gebran Bassil** (FPM)	Nemeh Ibrahim (FPM)	Said Touq (FPM)	George Boutros (FPM)	**Michel Moawad** (Independence Movement)	Pierre Raffoul (FPM)	Jawad Boulos (Independence Movement)	Nicolas Ghosn (Future)	**Georges Atallah** (FPM)	Greta Saab (FPM)
"Strong Republic Pulse"	Red	**Fadi Saad** (Lebanese Forces)	Samer Saada (Kataeb)	**Strida Geagea** (Lebanese Forces)	**Joseph Isaac** (Lebanese Forces)	Marius Baini (Lebanese Forces)	Michel Douaihy (Kataeb)	Kayssar Moawad	Fadi Karam (Lebanese Forces)	Albert Androus (Kataeb)	George Mansour (Democratic Left)
"With Us for the North and Lebanon"	Green	Boutros Harb		Roy Issa El Khoury	Melhem Gibran Tawk	**Tony Franjieh** (Marada)	**Estephan Douaihy** (Marada)	Salim Bey Karam (Marada)	**Selim Saadeh** (SSNP)	**Fayez Ghosn** (Marada)	Abdallah Zakhem
"Kulluna Watani" (We are all National)	Turquoise	Layal Bou Moussa (MMFD)	Antoun Khoury Harb (Sah)	Edmond Tawk (Sabaa)	Maurice Koura (Sabaa)	Riad Ghazala	Antonia Ghamra	Antoine Yammine (Sabaa)	Bassam Ghantous (Sabaa)	Fadwa Nassif (Sabaa)	
Source: ACE Project, Ministry of Interior and Municipalities

=== South I (Saida–Jezzine) ===
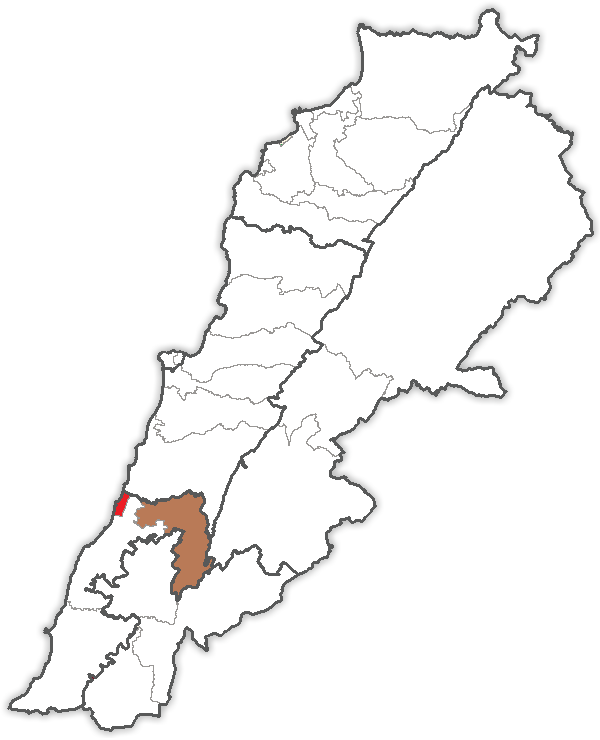
The South I electoral district, divided into two minor districts: Saida (red, corresponding to the Saida municipality) and Jezzine (brown, corresponding to Jezzine district)

In the Saida–Jezzine electoral district, four candidate lists crystallized: "Integration and Dignity" (Future Movement and independents), "Saida and Jezzine Together" (alliance between al-Jamaa al-Islamiah, Free Patriotic Movement and Dr. Abdul Rahman Bizri), "For All People" (alliance between Popular Nasserite Organization and Ibrahim Azar, supported by Amal Movement and Hezbollah) and the "Capacity of Change" List (alliance between Kataeb Party, Lebanese Forces and the March 11 Group).

The Future Movement and the Free Patriotic Movement had tried to negotiate an electoral pact, but reportedly FPM had insisted on keeping Bizri on their list. After the dialogue with Future broke down, FPM reached out to al-Jamaa al-Islamiah, since the Popular Nasserite Organization had already concluded a pact with Ibrahim Azar (an independent Maronite supported by Amal-Hezbollah alliance).

44.2% of the electorate is Sunni, 30.8% Maronite, 15.1% Shia, 8.69% Greek Catholic, 0.67% from other Christian communities and 0.48% Druze.

List		Sunni (Saida, 2 seats)		Maronite (Jezzine, 2 seats)		Greek Catholic (Jezzine, 1 seat)
"Integration and Dignity"	Blue	**Bahia Hariri** (Future)	Hassan Chamseddine (Future)	Amin Edmon Rizk	Angel Khawand	Robert Khoury
"Saida and Jezzine Together"	Purple	Abdul Rahman Bizri	Bassam Hammoud (Al-Jama'a al-Islamiyya)	Amal Abou Zeid (FPM)	**Ziad Aswad** (FPM)	**Salim Khoury** (FPM)
"For All People"	Red	**Osama Saad** (PNO)	Abdel Kader Bsat	**Ibrahim Samir Azar**		Yusuf Hanna Skaf
"Capacity of Change"	Navy Blue	Samir Bizri (March 11)		Joseph Nahra (Kataeb)		Ajaj Haddad (Lebanese Forces)
Source: Saida City, Ministry of Interior and Municipalities

=== South II (Zahrany–Tyre) ===
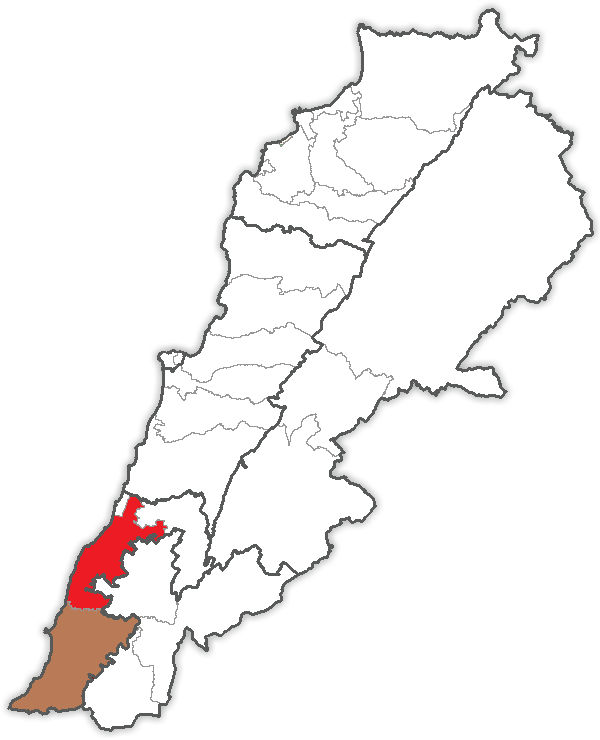
The South II electoral district, divided into 2 minor districts: Zahrani or Saida Villages (red, corresponding to areas of Saida District outside of Saida municipality) and Tyre (brown, corresponding to Tyre district)

In second southern electoral district 2 lists were registered. The "Hope and Loyalty" (Amal-Hezbollah) list led by Nabih Berri is challenged by the "Together for Change" list (an alliance of Riad Al-Assaad, the Lebanese Communist Party and independents).

The electorate is predominantly Shia (81.4%). 6.81% of the electorate is Greek Catholic, 6.1% Sunni, 4.55% Maronite and 1.14% belong to other Christian communities.

List		Shia (Tyre, 4 seats)				Shia (Zahrany, 2 seats)		Greek Catholic (Zahrany, 1 seat)
"Hope and Loyalty"	Green-Yellow	**Ali Khreis** (Amal)	**Hussein Jeshi** (Hezbollah)	**Inayat Ezzeddine** (Amal)	**Nawwaf Moussawi** (Hezbollah)	**Nabih Berri** (Amal)	**Ali Osseiran** (Amal)	**Michel Moussa** (Amal)
"Together for Change"	Red	Ahmed Marwa	Lina Husseini (LCP)	Abdel Nasser Farran	Ra'id Ataya (LCP)	Riad Assaad		Wisam Haj
Source: Al-Modon, Lebanon42, Al-Modon, Ministry of Interior and Municipalities

=== South III (Marjaayoun–Hasbaya–Nabatieh–Bint Jbeil) ===
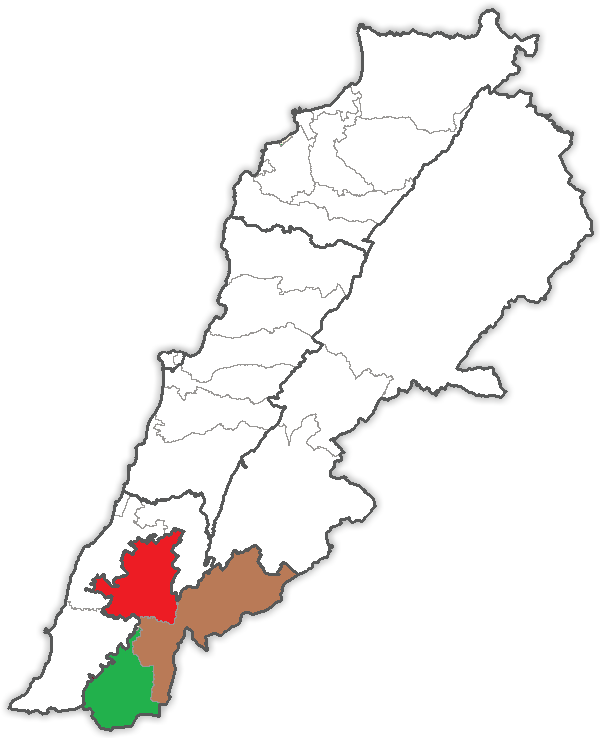
The South III electoral district, covering the Nabatieh Governorate, divided into 3 minor districts: Nabatieh (red, corresponding to Nabatieh district), Marjayoun-Hasbaya (brown, covering the Hasbaya and Marjayoun districts) and Bint Jbeil (green, corresponding to Bint Jbeil district

In third southern electoral district 6 lists were registered. The electorate is predominantly Shia (80.1%). 6.35% of the electorate is Sunni, 5.27% Maronite, 3.65% Druze, 2.45% Greek Orthodox, 1.8% Greek Catholic and 0.39% from other Christian communities.

The Amal-Hezbollah coalition fielded the "Hope and Loyalty" list. It includes a Baathist Sunni candidate, Kassem Hachem, who is fielded as Amal candidate and officially not sponsored by the Baath Party.

The Future Movement, the Free Patriotic Movement and the Lebanese Democratic Party fielded a joint list called "The South is Worth It", a list that L'Orient Le Jour labelled "supplementary" to the Amal-Hezbollah list. It includes a pro-Future independent Sunni candidate, Imad Khatib, who has business links to Amal leader Berri. Three Shia candidates (Badruddin, Sharafuddin and Osseiran) were previously close to Hezbollah. Two pro-FPM independent candidates were included in the list, Chadi Massaad (Greek Orthodox) and Mourhaf Ramadan (Shia). Druze candidate Dr. Wissam Charouf is a member of the Political Council of the Lebanese Democratic Party.

"A Vote for Change" list was fielded by the Lebanese Communist Party, the Communist Action Organization in Lebanon and independents. It includes a pro-SSNP independent candidate, Hussein Baydoun. The "National" coalition fielded a list with five candidates.

The two remaining of the lists in the fray took a more confrontative approach towards the Hezbollah-Amal dominance of the local political scene. The "Shibna Hakki" list was fielded by the Lebanese Forces and Shia dissidents, with the Shia journalist Ali Al-Amin on the list. Al-Amin had been publicly labelled as one of the "Shia of the [U.S.] Embassy" by Hezbollah general secretary Nasrallah. Al-Amin and fellow candidate and journalist Imad Komeyha, had been signatories to the 2017 call for fresh elections to the High Shia Council. Ahmed Assaad, leader of the Lebanese Option Party, fielded an anti-Hezbollah list of his own with candidates from his party. The list included Al-Assaad's wife Abeer Ramadan.

List		Shia (Bint Jbeil, 3 seats)			Shia (Nabatieh, 3 seats)			Shia (Marjaayoun-Hasbaya, 2 seats)		Sunni (Marjaayoun-Hasbaya, 1 seat)	Druze (Marjaayoun-Hasbaya, 1 seat)	Greek Orthodox (Marjaayoun-Hasbaya, 1 seat)
"Hope and Loyalty"	Green-Yellow	**Ali Ahmad Bazzi** (Amal)	**Ayoub Hmayed** (Amal)	**Hassan Fadlallah** (Hezbollah)	**Yassine Jaber** (Amal)	**Mohammad Raad** (Hezbollah)	**Hani Kobeissy** (Amal)	**Ali Hassan Khalil** (Amal)	**Ali Fayyad** (Hezbollah)	**Kassem Hachem** (Amal)	**Anwar Khalil** (Amal)	**Assaad Hardan** (SSNP)
"The South is Worth It"	Pink	Mohammed Qadouh	Hussein Shaer		Hisham Jaber	Mustafa Badruddin	Nadim Osseiran	Abbas Sharafuddin	Mourhaf Ramadan	Imad Khatib	Wissam Charouf (LDP)	Chadi Massaad
"Shibna Hakki"	Red	Ali Al-Amin			Ahmed Ismail	Rami Ollaik		Imad Komeyha				Fadi Salama (Lebanese Forces)
"A Vote for Change"	Yellow	Ahmed Murad (LCP)	Abbas Sorour	Hussein Baydoun	Ali Al-Haj Ali (LCP)					Said Issa	Ghassan Hadifa (LCP)	Hala Abu Kasm (LCP)
"We Change"	Navy Blue	Mohammed Faraj (Lebanese Option)	Abdallah Salman (Lebanese Option)		Ahmed Assaad (Lebanese Option)			Abeer Ramadhan (Lebanese Option)	Rabah Abi Haidar (Lebanese Option)	Adnan Khatib (Lebanese Option)	Kanaj Alimuddin (Lebanese Option)	Minah Saab (Lebanese Option)
"Kulluna Watani" (We are all National)	Turquoise	Rima Hamid (Sabaa)	Salah Nouruddin		Jamil Balout (Sabaa)						Akram Qais	Fadi Abu Jamra (Mouttahidoun)
Source: Al-Modon, Jaboubia, Jaboubia Ministry of Interior and Municipalities

=== Result by candidate ===
Name	Electoral district	Sect	List	Party	Votes	% of electoral district	% of preferential votes for sect seat in minor district	% of list	Elected?	Gender
Mohammad Raad	South III (Nabatieh)	SH	"Hope and Loyalty" (South III)	Hezbollah	43,797	19.40	56.19	22.67	Yes	
Nabih Berri	South II (Zahrany)	SH	"Hope and Loyalty" (South II)	Amal	42,137	28.61	91.68	31.43	Yes	
Hassan Fadlallah	South III (Bint Jbeil)	SH	"Hope and Loyalty" (South III)	Hezbollah	39,722	17.59	64.01	20.56	Yes	
Jamil Al Sayyed	Bekaa III	SH	"Hope and Loyalty" (Bekaa III)		33,223	17.76	25.40	23.60	Yes	
Ali Fayyad	South III (Marjayoun-Hasbaya)	SH	"Hope and Loyalty" (South III)	Hezbollah	27,460	12.16	61.69	14.21	Yes	
Nawwaf Moussawi	South II (Tyre)	SH	"Hope and Loyalty" (South II)	Hezbollah	24,379	16.55	28.12	18.18	Yes	
Hussein Jeshi	South II (Tyre)	SH	"Hope and Loyalty" (South II)	Hezbollah	23,864	16.20	27.52	17.80	Yes	
Amin Sherri	Beirut II	SH	"Unity of Beirut"	Hezbollah	22,961	15.96	64.26	48.76	Yes	
Najib Mikati	North II (Tripoli)	SU	"Determination"	Azm Movement	21,300	14.55	29.78	50.69	Yes	
Saad Hariri	Beirut II	SU	"Future for Beirut"	Future	20,751	14.43	22.90	32.95	Yes	
Hani Kobeissy	South III (Nabatieh)	SH	"Hope and Loyalty" (South III)	Amal	20,504	9.08	26.30	10.61	Yes	
Walid Wajih Barini	North I	SU	"Future of Akkar"	Future	20,426	15.31	29.45	26.72	Yes	
Inayat Ezzeddine	South II (Tyre)	SH	"Hope and Loyalty" (South II)	Amal	18,815	12.77	21.70	14.03	Yes	Venus symbol
Ihab Hamadeh	Bekaa III	SH	"Hope and Loyalty" (Bekaa III)	Hezbollah	18,404	9.84	14.07	13.08	Yes	
Ghazi Zaiter	Bekaa III	SH	"Hope and Loyalty" (Bekaa III)	Amal	17,767	9.50	13.58	12.62	Yes	
Ali Mekdad	Bekaa III	SH	"Hope and Loyalty" (Bekaa III)	Hezbollah	17,321	9.26	13.24	12.31	Yes	
Ibrahim Moussawi	Bekaa III	SH	"Hope and Loyalty" (Bekaa III)	Hezbollah	16,942	9.06	12.95	12.04	Yes	
Ali Hassan Khalil	South III (Marjayoun-Hasbaya)	SH	"Hope and Loyalty" (South III)	Amal	16,765	7.43	37.67	8.68	Yes	
Gebran Bassil	North III (Batroun)	MA	"Strong North"	FPM	12,269	17.38	35.98	33.28	Yes	
Ali Khreis	South II (Tyre)	SH	"Hope and Loyalty" (South II)	Amal	15,672	10.64	18.07	11.69	Yes	
Hussein el Hage Hassan	Bekaa III	SH	"Hope and Loyalty" (Bekaa III)	Hezbollah	15,662	8.37	11.97	11.13	Yes	
Anwar Jomaa	Bekaa I	SH	"Zahle Options and Decisions"	Hezbollah	15,601	17.02	78.39	66.26	Yes	
Abdel Rahim Murad	Bekaa II	SU	"Best Tomorrow"	Union Party	15,111	22.73	46.43	46.38	Yes	
Mohammed Suleiman	North I	SU	"Future of Akkar"	Future	14,911	11.18	21.50	19.50	Yes	
Antoine Habchi	Bekaa III	MA	"Dignity and Development"	Lebanese Forces	14,858	7.94	77.84	41.73	Yes	
Ziad Hawat	Mount Lebanon I (Byblos)	MA	"Clear Change"	Lebanese Forces	14,424	12.48	35.54	53.46	Yes	
Mohammad Tarek Talal Maaribi	North I	SU	"Future of Akkar"	Future	14,145	10.60	20.40	18.50	Yes	
Akram Chehayeb	Mount Lebanon IV (Aley)	DR	"Reconciliation"	PSP	14,088	8.26	54.74	14.24	Yes	
Samy Gemayel	Mount Lebanon II	MA	"Pulse Metn"	Kataeb	13,968	15.45	30.69	73.50	Yes	
Bahia Hariri	South I (Saida)	SU	"Integration and Dignity"	Future	13,739	20.90	42.15	83.42	Yes	Venus symbol
Ali Ammar	Mount Lebanon III	SH	"National Reconciliation"	Hezbollah	13,692	17.45	61.53	33.67	Yes	
Pierre Bouassi	Mount Lebanon III	MA	"Unity and Development of Baabda"	Lebanese Forces	13,498	17.20	34.68	50.94	Yes	
Hadi Hobeiche	North I	MA	"Future of Akkar"	Future	13,055	9.79	54.45	17.08	Yes	
Adnan Trabelsi	Beirut II	SU	"Unity of Beirut"	Al-Ahbash	13,018	9.05	14.36	27.65	Yes	
Michel Murr	Mount Lebanon II	GO	"Metn Loyalty"		11,945	13.21	50.14	86.69	Yes	
Jihad Samad	North II (Dennieh)	SU	"National Dignity"		11,897	8.13	36.45	40.88	Yes	
Hadi Abou el-Hosn	Mount Lebanon III	DR	"Unity and Development of Baabda"	PSP	11,844	15.09	78.25	44.69	Yes	
Ibrahim Azar	South I (Jezzine)	MA	"For All People"		11,663	17.74	46.49	52.81	Yes	
Taymour Jumblatt	Mount Lebanon IV (Chouf)	DR	"Reconciliation"	PSP	11,478	6.73	39.93	11.60	Yes	
Tony Franjieh	North III (Zgharta)	MA	"With Us for the North and Lebanon"	Marada	11,407	9.85	33.02	27.97	Yes	
George Akeis	Bekaa I	GC	"Zahle is Our Cause"	Lebanese Forces	11,363	12.40	32.03	60.76	Yes	
Fouad Makhzoumi	Beirut II	SU	"Lebnan Herzen"	National Dialogue Party	11,346	7.89	12.52	71.93	Yes	
Neemat Frem	Mount Lebanon I (Kesrwan)	MA	"Strong Lebanon"		10,717	9.27	17.64	19.65	Yes	
Wael Abou Faour	Bekaa II	DR	"Future for West Bekaa"	PSP	10,677	16.06	83.95	33.56	Yes	
Osman Alameddine	North II (Minnieh)	SU	"Future for the North"	Future	10,221	6.98	50.59	19.68	Yes	
Alain Aoun	Mount Lebanon III	MA	"National Reconciliation"	FPM	10,200	13.00	26.21	25.08	Yes	
Chawki Daccache	Mount Lebanon I (Kesrwan)	MA	"Clear Change"	Lebanese Forces	10,032	8.68	16.51	37.18	Yes	
Mohammed Hajjar	Mount Lebanon IV (Chouf)	SU	"Reconciliation"	Future	10,003	5.86	35.01	10.11	Yes	
Georges Adwan	Mount Lebanon IV (Chouf)	MA	"Reconciliation"	Lebanese Forces	9,956	5.83	29.68	10.06	Yes	
Osama Saad	South I (Saida)	SU	"For All People"	PNO	9,880	15.03	30.31	44.74	Yes	
Fadi Saad	North III (Batroun)	MA	"Strong Republic Pulse"	Lebanese Forces	9,842	8.50	30.77	26.33	Yes	
Michel George Daher	Bekaa I	GC	"Zahle for All"		9,742	10.63	27.46	26.77	Yes	
Simon Abi Rumia	Mount Lebanon I (Byblos)	MA	"Strong Lebanon"	FPM	9,729	8.41	23.97	17.84	Yes	
Mohammad Kabbara	North II (Tripoli)	SU	"Future for the North"	Future	9,600	6.56	13.42	18.48	Yes	
Tamam Salam	Beirut II	SU	"Future for Beirut"	Future	9,599	6.67	10.59	15.24	Yes	
Samir Jisr	North II (Tripoli)	SU	"Future for the North"	Future	9,527	6.51	13.32	18.34	Yes	
Ali Ahmad Bazzi	South III (Bint Jbeil)	SH	"Hope and Loyalty" (South III)	Amal	9,290	4.11	14.97	4.81	Yes	
Farid Heikal Al Khazen	Mount Lebanon I (Kesrwan)	MA	"Anna al-Qarar"	Khazen Bloc	9,081	7.85	14.95	48.95	Yes	
Eddy Abillammaa	Mount Lebanon II	MA	"Metn Heart of Lebanon"	Lebanese Forces	8,922	9.87	19.61	67.91	Yes	
Mohammad Nasrallah	Bekaa II	SH	"Best Tomorrow"	Amal	8,897	13.38	90.79	27.31	Yes	
Mohammed Qar'awi	Bekaa II	SU	"Future for West Bekaa"	Future	8,768	13.19	26.94	27.56	Yes	
Michel Moawad	North III (Zgharta)	MA	"Strong North"	Independence Movement	8,571	7.40	24.81	25.71	Yes	
Bilal Abdullah	Mount Lebanon IV (Chouf)	SU	"Reconciliation"	PSP	8,492	4.98	29.73	8.58	Yes	
Cesar Abi Khalil	Mount Lebanon IV (Aley)	MA	"Mountain Pledge"	FPM	8,124	4.76	38.51	20.82	Yes	
Sami Fatfat	North II (Dennieh)	SU	"Future for the North"	Future	7,943	5.42	24.33	15.29	Yes	
Yassine Jaber	South III (Nabatieh)	SH	"Hope and Loyalty" (South III)	Amal	7,920	3.51	10.16	4.10	Yes	
Wahbi Qatisha	North I	GO	"Future of Akkar"	Lebanese Forces	7,911	5.93	26.48	10.35	Yes	
Henri Helou	Mount Lebanon IV (Aley)	MA	"Reconciliation"	PSP	7,894	4.63	37.42	7.98	Yes	
Talal Arslan	Mount Lebanon IV (Aley)	DR	"Mountain Pledge"	LDP	7,887	4.62	30.64	20.21	Yes	
Ayoub Hmayed	South III (Bint Jbeil)	SH	"Hope and Loyalty" (South III)	Amal	7,875	3.49	12.69	4.08	Yes	
Anis Nasar	Mount Lebanon IV (Aley)	GO	"Reconciliation"	Lebanese Forces	7,872	4.61	54.35	7.95	Yes	
Mohammad Khawaja	Beirut II	SH	"Unity of Beirut"	Amal	7,834	5.45	21.92	16.64	Yes	
Asaad Dergham	North I	GO	"Strong Akkar"	FPM	7,435	5.57	24.88	21.59	Yes	
Chamel Roukoz	Mount Lebanon I (Kesrwan)	MA	"Strong Lebanon"		7,300	6.31	12.01	13.38	Yes	
Elias Bousaab	Mount Lebanon II	GO	"Strong Metn"	FPM	7,299	8.07	30.64	18.76	Yes	
Ziad Aswad	South I (Jezzine)	MA	"Saida and Jezzine Together"	FPM	7,270	11.06	28.98	36.12	Yes	
Marwan Hamadeh	Mount Lebanon IV (Chouf)	DR	"Reconciliation"	PSP	7,266	4.26	25.28	7.34	Yes	
Nima Tomeh	Mount Lebanon IV (Chouf)	GC	"Reconciliation"	PSP	7,253	4.25	58.21	7.33	Yes	
Asim Araji	Bekaa I	SU	"Zahle for All"	Future	7,224	7.88	69.49	19.85	Yes	
Hagop Pakradounian	Mount Lebanon II	AO	"Strong Metn"	Tashnaq	7,182	7.94	95.79	18.46	Yes	
Ibrahim Kanaan	Mount Lebanon II	MA	"Strong Metn"	FPM	7,179	7.94	15.78	18.46	Yes	
Faisal Karami	North II (Tripoli)	SU	"National Dignity"	Dignity Movement	7,126	4.87	9.96	24.49	Yes	
Elwalid Succariyeh	Bekaa III	SU	"Hope and Loyalty" (Bekaa III)		6,916	3.70	31.99	4.91	Yes	
Roger Azar	Mount Lebanon I (Kesrwan)	MA	"Strong Lebanon"	FPM	6,793	5.88	11.18	12.45	Yes	
Strida Geagea	North III (Bcharre)	MA	"Strong Republic Pulse"	Lebanese Forces	6,677	5.77	35.66	17.86	Yes	Venus symbol
Rola Tabash	Beirut II	SU	"Future for Beirut"	Future	6,637	4.61	7.32	10.54	Yes	Venus symbol
Nohad Machnouk	Beirut II	SU	"Future for Beirut"	Future	6,411	4.46	7.07	10.18	Yes	
Fadi Alame	Mount Lebanon III	SH	"National Reconciliation"	Amal	6,348	8.09	28.53	15.61	Yes	
Anwar Khalil	South III (Marjayoun-Hasbaya)	DR	"Hope and Loyalty" (South III)	Amal	6,347	2.81	69.54	3.28	Yes	
Kassem Hachem	South III (Marjayoun-Hasbaya)	SU	"Hope and Loyalty" (South III)	Amal	6,012	2.66	40.70	3.11	Yes	
Bakr Hojeiry	Bekaa III	SU	"Dignity and Development"	Future	5,994	3.20	27.73	16.83	Yes	
Joseph Isaac	North III (Bcharre)	MA	"Strong Republic Pulse"	Lebanese Forces	5,990	5.17	31.99	16.03	Yes	
Edgar Maalouf	Mount Lebanon II	GC	"Strong Metn"	FPM	5,961	6.59	55.00	15.33	Yes	
Albert Mansour	Bekaa III	GC	"Hope and Loyalty" (Bekaa III)	Endorsed by SSNP	5,881	3.14	56.35	4.18	Yes	
Salim Aoun	Bekaa I	MA	"Zahle for All"	FPM	5,567	6.07	67.61	15.30	Yes	
Estephan Douaihy	North III (Zgharta)	MA	"With Us for the North and Lebanon"	Marada	5,435	4.69	15.73	13.32	Yes	
Selim Saadeh	North III (Koura)	GO	"With Us for the North and Lebanon"	SSNP	5,263	4.55	20.00	12.90	Yes	
Mario Aoun	Mount Lebanon IV (Chouf)	MA	"Mountain Pledge"	FPM	5,124	3.00	15.28	13.13	Yes	
Elie Ferzli	Bekaa II	GO	"Best Tomorrow"		4,899	7.37	81.06	15.04	Yes	
Nicolas Sehnaoui	Beirut I	GC	"Strong Beirut I"	FPM	4,788	10.97	57.48	26.06	Yes	
Hikmat Dib	Mount Lebanon III	MA	"National Reconciliation"	FPM	4,428	5.64	11.38	10.89	Yes	
Fayez Ghosn	North III (Koura)	GO	"With Us for the North and Lebanon"	Marada	4,224	3.65	16.05	10.36	Yes	
Jean Talouzian	Beirut I	AC	"Beirut I"		4,166	9.54	76.05	24.84	Yes	
Michel Moussa	South II (Zahrany)	GC	"Hope and Loyalty" (South II)	Amal	4,162	2.83	46.81	3.10	Yes	
Nadim Gemayel	Beirut I	MA	"Beirut I"	Kataeb	4,096	9.38	45.68	24.42	Yes	
Emad Wakim	Beirut I	GO	"Beirut I"	Lebanese Forces	3,936	9.01	58.79	23.47	Yes	
Cesar Maalouf	Bekaa I	GO	"Zahle is Our Cause"		3,554	3.88	40.58	19.00	Yes	
Hakop Terzian	Beirut I	AO	"Strong Beirut I"	Tashnaq	3,451	7.90	30.47	18.78	Yes	
George Atallah	North III (Koura)	GO	"Strong North"	FPM	3,383	2.92	12.85	10.15	Yes	
Assaad Hardan	South III (Marjayoun-Hasbaya)	GO	"Hope and Loyalty" (South III)	SSNP	3,321	1.47	34.25	1.72	Yes	
Farid Bustani	Mount Lebanon IV (Chouf)	MA	"Mountain Pledge"		2,657	1.56	7.92	6.81	Yes	
Elias Hankache	Mount Lebanon II	MA	"Pulse Metn"	Kataeb	2,583	2.86	5.68	13.59	Yes	
Paula Yacoubian	Beirut I	AO	"Kulluna Watani" (We are all National) (Beirut I)	Saaba	2,500	5.73	22.07	36.54	Yes	Venus symbol
Alexander Matossian	Beirut I	AO	"Strong Beirut I"	Tashnaq	2,376	5.44	20.98	12.93	Yes	
Nazih Najem	Beirut II	GO	"Future for Beirut"	Future	2,351	1.63	40.65	3.73	Yes	
Alawi Darwish	North II (Tripoli)	AL	"Determination"	Azm Movement	2,246	1.53	36.27	5.35	Yes	
Ali Osseiran	South II (Zahrany)	SH	"Hope and Loyalty" (South II)	Amal	2,203	1.50	4.79	1.64	Yes	
Dima Jamali	North II (Tripoli)	SU	"Future for the North"	Future	2,066	1.41	2.89	3.98	Yes	Venus symbol
Edgar Trabelsi	Beirut II	EV	"Unity of Beirut"	FPM	1,919	1.33	53.45	4.08	Yes	
Faisal Al Sayegh	Beirut II	DR	"Future for Beirut"	PSP	1,902	1.32	68.15	3.02	Yes	
Henri Chadid	Bekaa II	MA	"Future for West Bekaa"		1,584	2.38	48.46	4.98	Yes	
Mustafa Ali Hussein	North I	AL	"Strong Akkar"	Lebanese People's Movement	1,353	1.01	20.68	3.93	Yes	
Jean Obeid	North II (Tripoli)	MA	"Determination"	Azm Movement	1,136	0.78	26.55	2.70	Yes	
Nicolas Nahas	North II (Tripoli)	GO	"Determination"	Azm Movement	1,057	0.72	41.91	2.52	Yes	
Salim Khoury	South I (Jezzine)	GC	"Saida and Jezzine Together"	FPM	708	1.08	12.67	3.52	Yes	
Antoine Pano	Beirut I	MI	"Strong Beirut I"	FPM	539	1.23	34.11	2.93	Yes	
Moustapha Husseini	Mount Lebanon I (Byblos)	SH	"Anna al-Qarar"	Khazen Bloc	256	0.22	2.22	1.38	Yes	
Eddie Demirjian	Bekaa I	AO	"Zahle Options and Decisions"		77	0.08	1.30	0.33	Yes	
Hussein Zuaitar	Mount Lebanon I (Byblos)	SH	"National Solidarity"	Hezbollah	9,369	8.10	81.12	74.65		
Jamie Jabbour	North I	MA	"Strong Akkar"	FPM	8,667	6.50	36.15	25.17		
Imad Khatib	South III (Marjayoun-Hasbaya)	SU	"The South is Worth It"		8,543	3.78	57.83	50.08		
Ziad Qadri	Bekaa II	SU	"Future for West Bekaa"	Future	8,392	12.62	25.79	26.38	No	
Mohammad Yehia	North I	SU	"Strong Akkar"		8,144	6.10	11.74	23.65		
Fadi Karam	North III (Koura)	GO	"Strong Republic Pulse"	Lebanese Forces	7,822	6.75	29.72	20.93	No	
Walid Khoury	Mount Lebanon I (Byblos)	MA	"Strong Lebanon"		7,782	6.73	19.18	14.27	No	
Wiam Wahhab	Mount Lebanon IV (Chouf)	DR	"National Unity"	Arab Unification Party	7,340	4.30	25.54	57.36		
Kazim Kheir	North II (Minnieh)	SU	"Determination"	Azm Movement	6,754	4.61	33.43	16.07		
Yehia Chammas	Bekaa III	SH	"Dignity and Development"		6,658	3.56	5.09	18.70		
Mansour al Bon	Mount Lebanon I (Kesrwan)	MA	"Strong Lebanon"		6,589	5.70	10.84	12.08		
Qassem Abdel Aziz	North II (Dennieh)	SU	"Future for the North"	Future	6,382	4.36	19.55	12.29	No	
Mariam Skaff	Bekaa I	GC	"Popular Bloc"	Popular Bloc	6,348	6.92	17.89	58.32		Venus symbol
Boutros Harb	North III (Batroun)	MA	"With Us for the North and Lebanon"		6,155	5.32	19.24	15.09	No	
Ashraf Rifi	North II (Tripoli)	SU	"Sovereign Lebanon" (North II)	Rifi Bloc	5,931	4.05	8.29	61.42		
Rabea Hassouna	Beirut II	SU	"Future for Beirut"	Future	5,825	4.05	6.43	9.25		
Nicolas Fattouch	Bekaa I	GC	"Zahle Options and Decisions"		5,737	6.26	16.17	24.37	No	
Fares Souhaid	Mount Lebanon I (Byblos)	MA	"Anna al-Qarar"		5,617	4.86	13.84	30.28		
Mohamed Shadeed	North I	SU	"Strong Akkar"	Al-Jama'a al-Islamiyya	5,277	3.96	7.61	15.33		
Naji Bustani	Mount Lebanon IV (Chouf)	MA	"Reconciliation"		5,245	3.07	15.64	5.30	No	
Amal Abou Zeid	South I (Jezzine)	MA	"Saida and Jezzine Together"	FPM	5,016	7.63	19.99	24.92	No	
Ghattas Khoury	Mount Lebanon IV (Chouf)	MA	"Reconciliation"	Future	4,998	2.93	14.90	5.05		
Hussein Solh	Bekaa III	SU	"Dignity and Development"	Future	4,974	2.66	23.01	13.97		
Emile Abboud	North I	GO	"Decision for Akkar"	SSNP	4,915	3.68	16.45	34.02		
Wissam Haj	South II (Zahrany)	GC	"Together for Change"		4,729	3.21	53.19	41.19		
Melhem Gibran Touk	North III (Bcharre)	MA	"With Us for the North and Lebanon"		4,649	4.01	24.83	11.40		
Ajaj Haddad	South I (Jezzine)	GC	"Capacity of Change"	Lebanese Forces	4,398	6.69	78.73	70.50		
Sarkis Sarkis	Mount Lebanon II	MA	"Strong Metn"		4,337	4.80	9.53	11.15		
Hussein Salloum	North I	AL	"Decision for Akkar"		4,245	3.18	64.89	29.38		
Taha Naji	North II (Tripoli)	SU	"National Dignity"	Al-Ahbash	4,152	2.84	5.80	14.27		
Assaad Nakad	Bekaa I	GO	"Zahle for All"		4,138	4.51	47.24	11.37		
Ghassan Atallah	Mount Lebanon IV (Chouf)	GC	"Mountain Pledge"	FPM	4,113	2.41	33.01	10.54		
Mohammed Fadhil	North II (Dennieh)	SU	"Determination"	Azm Movement	4,006	2.74	12.27	9.53		
Nizar Dalloul	Bekaa I	SH	"Zahle for All"	Future	3,947	4.31	19.83	10.85		
Imad Hout	Beirut II	SU	"Beirut al-Watan"	al-Jama'a al-Islamiah	3,938	2.74	4.35	52.68	No	
Ziad Baroud	Mount Lebanon I (Kesrwan)	MA	"Strong Lebanon"		3,893	3.37	6.41	7.14		
Emile Rahme	Bekaa III	MA	"Hope and Loyalty" (Bekaa III)	Solidarity Party	3,861	2.06	20.23	2.74	No	
Marie-Jeanne Bilezikjian	Bekaa I	AO	"Zahle for All"		3,851	4.20	65.11	10.58		Venus symbol
Massoud Achkar	Beirut I	MA	"Strong Beirut I"	Union for Lebanon	3,762	8.62	41.95	20.48		
Jean Moussa	North I	GO	"Future of Akkar"	Future	3,759	2.82	12.58	4.92		
Pierre Raffoul	North III (Zgharta)	MA	"Strong North"	FPM	3,749	3.24	10.85	11.24		
Abdel Rahman Bizri	South I (Saida)	SU	"Saida and Jezzine Together"		3,509	5.34	10.77	17.43		
Ali Al Hajj	Mount Lebanon IV (Chouf)	SU	"Mountain Pledge"		3,374	1.98	11.81	8.65		
Michel Pharaon	Beirut I	GC	"Beirut I"		3,214	7.36	38.58	19.16	No	
Bassam Hammoud	South I (Saida)	SU	"Saida and Jezzine Together"	Al-Jama'a al-Islamiyya	3,204	4.87	9.83	15.92		
Nicolas Ghosn	North III (Koura)	GO	"Strong North"	Future	3,190	2.75	12.12	9.57	No	
Naji Gharios	Mount Lebanon III	MA	"National Reconciliation"	FPM	2,916	3.72	7.49	7.17	No	
Ahmed Mahmoud Omran	North II (Tripoli)	AL	"National Dignity"		2,794	1.91	45.12	9.60		
Marius Baini	North III (Zgharta)	MA	"Strong Republic Pulse"	Lebanese Forces	2,776	2.40	8.04	7.43		
Elias Hanna	Mount Lebanon IV (Aley)	GO	"Mountain Pledge"	FPM	2,760	1.62	19.05	7.07		
Ghassan Achkar	Mount Lebanon II	MA	"Strong Metn"	SSNP	2,757	3.05	6.06	7.09		
Michel Emile Daher	Bekaa III	GC	"Independent"	FPM	2,742	1.47	26.27	50.13		
Charbel Nahas	Mount Lebanon II	GC	"Kulluna Watani" (We are all National) (Mount Lebanon II)	Citizens in the State	2,680	2.96	24.73	53.31		
Ghassan Mukhaiber	Mount Lebanon II	GO	"Strong Metn"		2,654	2.94	11.14	6.82	No	
Karim Rassi	North I	GO	"Decision for Akkar"	Marada Movement	2,590	1.94	8.67	17.93		
Ramzi Bou Khaled	Mount Lebanon III	MA	"Together for Baabda"	Kataeb	2,586	3.30	6.64	44.83		
Ali Al-Haj Ali	South III (Nabatieh)	SH	"A Vote for Change"	LCP	2,541	1.13	3.26	43.10		
Wissam Charouf	South III (Marjayoun-Hasbaya)	DR	"The South is Worth It"	LDP	2,512	1.11	27.52	14.73		
Zaher Eido	Beirut II	SU	"Future for Beirut"	Future	2,510	1.75	2.77	3.99		
Samer Saada	North III (Batroun)	MA	"Strong Republic Pulse"	Kataeb	2,470	2.13	7.72	6.61	No	
Ali Al Shaer	Beirut II	SH	"Future for Beirut"	Future	2,462	1.71	6.89	3.91		
Fadi Salama	South III (Marjayoun-Hasbaya)	GO	"Shibna Hakki"	Lebanese Forces	2,435	1.08	25.12	51.70		
Tareq Khatib	Mount Lebanon IV (Chouf)	SU	"Mountain Pledge"	FPM	2,382	1.40	8.34	6.10		
Souhail Awar	Mount Lebanon III	DR	"National Reconciliation"	LDP	2,257	2.88	14.91	5.55		
Shaker Salameh	Mount Lebanon I (Kesrwan)	MA	"Anna al-Qarar"	Kataeb	2,239	1.94	3.69	12.07		
Walid Anis Khairallah	Mount Lebanon IV (Aley)	GO	"National Unity"		2,165	1.27	14.95	16.92		
Raji Saad	Mount Lebanon IV (Aley)	MA	"Reconciliation"		2,129	1.25	10.09	2.15		
Kamal Kheir	North II (Minnieh)	SU	"People's Decision"		2,128	1.45	10.53	51.63		
Ghada Maroni Eid	Mount Lebanon IV (Chouf)	MA	"Kulluna Watani" (We are all National) (Mount Lebanon IV)		2,094	1.23	6.24	20.97		Venus symbol
Faisal Daoud	Bekaa II	DR	"Best Tomorrow"	Lebanese Arab Struggle Movement	2,041	3.07	16.05	6.26		
Wasim Alwan	North II (Tripoli)	SU	"Independent Decision"	al-Jama'a al-Islamiah	2,000	1.37	2.80	47.80		
Elie Gharios	Mount Lebanon III	MA	"Together for Baabda"	Endorsed by NLP	1,912	2.44	4.91	33.15		
George Bushikian	Bekaa I	AO	"Popular Bloc"	Popular Bloc	1,845	2.01	31.19	16.95		
Ghazi Yusuf	Beirut II	SH	"Future for Beirut"	Future	1,759	1.22	4.92	2.79	No	
Zoya Jureidini	Mount Lebanon IV (Aley)	GO	"Kulluna Watani" (We are all National) (Mount Lebanon IV)		1,688	0.99	11.65	16.90		Venus symbol
Ibrahim Mneimneh	Beirut II	SU	"We are All Beirut"		1,676	1.17	1.85	27.15		
Chadi Massaad	South III (Marjayoun-Hasbaya)	GO	"The South is Worth It"		1,671	0.74	17.24	9.80		
Ali Al Amin	South III (Bint Jbeil)	SH	"Shibna Hakki"		1,630	0.72	2.63	34.61		
Mahmoud Hadara	North I	SU	"Strong Akkar"		1,628	1.22	2.35	4.73		
Riad Assaad	South II (Zahrany)	SH	"Together for Change"		1,620	1.10	3.52	14.11		
Hala Abu Kasm	South III (Marjayoun-Hasbaya)	GO	"A Vote for Change"	LCP	1,593	0.71	16.43	27.02		Venus symbol
Salim Bey Karam	North III (Zgharta)	MA	"With Us for the North and Lebanon"	Marada	1,590	1.37	4.60	3.90	No	
Younis Rifai	Bekaa III	SU	"Hope and Loyalty" (Bekaa III)	Al-Ahbash	1,589	0.85	7.35	1.13		
Sebouh Kalpakian	Beirut I	AO	"Strong Beirut I"	Hunchak	1,566	3.59	13.83	8.52	No	
Ziad Abs	Beirut I	GO	"Kulluna Watani" (We are all National) (Beirut I)	Sa<refH name=beirutI1/>	1,525	3.49	22.78	22.29		
Mark Daou	Mount Lebanon IV (Aley)	DR	"Civic"		1,505	0.88	5.85	51.61		
Mohamed Nadim Jisr	North II (Tripoli)	SU	"Determination"	Azm Movement	1,477	1.01	2.06	3.52		
Mustafa Badruddin	South III (Nabatieh)	SH	"The South is Worth It"		1,454	0.64	1.87	8.52		
Ra'id Ataya	South II (Tyre)	SH	"Together for Change"	LCP	1,382	0.94	1.59	12.04		
Muhammad Ali Mita	Bekaa I	SU	"Zahle is Our Cause"		1,370	1.49	13.18	7.33		
Khalil Broummana	Beirut II	GO	"Lebnan Herzen"		1,369	0.95	23.67	8.68		
Wasif Harakat	Mount Lebanon III	SH	"Kulluna Watani" (We are all National) (Mount Lebanon III)		1,308	1.67	5.88	26.20		
Riad Rahal	North I	GO	"Strong Akkar"		1,304	0.98	4.36	3.79	No	
Rafli Anton Diab	North II (Tripoli)	MA	"National Dignity"	Marada	1,286	0.88	30.06	4.42		
Abdel Nasser Farran	South II (Tyre)	SH	"Together for Change"		1,241	0.84	1.43	10.81		
Teodora Bajani	Mount Lebanon IV (Aley)	MA	"Free Decision"	Kataeb	1,219	0.71	5.78	22.38		Venus symbol
Zeina Majdalani	Beirut II	GO	"We are All Beirut"		1,218	0.85	21.06	19.73		Venus symbol
Elie Maroni	Bekaa I	MA	"Zahle is Our Cause"	Kataeb	1,213	1.32	14.73	6.49	No	
Michel Mecattaf	Mount Lebanon II	GC	"Metn Heart of Lebanon"		1,212	1.34	11.18	9.23		
Jean-Louis Cardahi	Mount Lebanon I (Byblos)	MA	"National Solidarity"		1,209	1.05	2.98	9.63		
Samir Bizri	South I (Saida)	SU	"Capacity of Change"	March 11	1,198	1.82	3.68	19.20		
Ziad Akel	Mount Lebanon III	MA	"Kulluna Watani" (We are all National) (Mount Lebanon III)		1,192	1.52	3.06	23.88		
Hassan Faysal Sano	Beirut II	SU	"We are All Beirut"		1,174	0.82	1.30	19.02		
Faiz Shukr	Bekaa III	SH	"Independent"		1,159	0.62	0.89	21.19		
Chadi Nachabe	North II (Tripoli)	SU	"Future for the North"	Future	1,135	0.78	1.59	2.19		
Mohammed Sami Hajjar	Mount Lebanon IV (Chouf)	SU	"Kulluna Watani" (We are all National) (Mount Lebanon IV)		1,133	0.66	3.97	11.34		
Siham Antoune	Bekaa III	GC	"Development and Change"	LCP	1,123	0.60	10.76	27.71		Venus symbol
Said Touq	North III (Bcharre)	MA	"Strong North"	FPM	1,112	0.96	5.94	3.34		
George Nader	North I	MA	"Decision of Akkar"		1,112	0.83	4.64	54.72		
Camille Dory Chamoun	Mount Lebanon IV (Chouf)	MA	"Free Decision"	NLP	1,084	0.64	3.23	19.90		
Elie Saad	North I	GO	"Sovereign Lebanon" (North I)	Rifi Bloc	1,082	0.81	3.62	22.96		
Ahmed Jowhar	North I	SU	"Sovereign Lebanon" (North I)	Rifi Bloc	1,059	0.79	1.53	22.47		
Gilbert Doumit	Beirut I	MA	"Kulluna Watani" (We are all National) (Beirut I)	LiBaladi	1,046	2.40	11.66	15.29		
Ahmed Murad	South III (Bint Jbeil)	SH	"A Vote for Change"	LCP	1,044	0.46	1.68	17.71		
Jessica Azar	Mount Lebanon II	GO	"Metn Heart of Lebanon"		1,030	1.14	4.32	7.84		Venus symbol
Hassan Chamseddine	South I (Saida)	SU	"Integration and Dignity"	Future	1,026	1.56	3.15	6.23		
Hussein Shaer	South III (Bint Jbeil)	SH	"The South is Worth It"		1,020	0.45	1.64	5.98		
Razi Haj	Mount Lebanon II	MA	"Metn Heart of Lebanon"		1,018	1.13	2.24	7.75		
Ahmed Ajoumi	Bekaa I	SU	"Popular Bloc"	Popular Bloc	1,008	1.10	9.70	9.26		
Ghassan Skaf	Bekaa II	GO	"Future for West Bekaa"		995	1.50	16.46	3.13		
Walid Sawalhi	North II (Tripoli)	SU	"Future for the North"	Future	994	0.68	1.39	1.91		
Michel Skaff	Bekaa I	GC	"Zahle for All"		987	1.08	2.78	2.71		
Rania Masri	Mount Lebanon III	DR	"Kulluna Watani" (We are all National) (Mount Lebanon III)	Citizens in the State	958	1.22	6.33	19.19		Venus symbol
Layal Bou Moussa	North III (Batroun)	MA	"Kulluna Watani" (We are all National) (North III)	Citizens in the State	952	0.82	2.98	30.13		Venus symbol
Samih Ezzeddine	Bekaa III	SU	"Development and Change"		927	0.50	4.29	22.87		
Yehia Mawloud	North II (Tripoli)	SU	"Kulluna Watani" (We are all National) (North II)		909	0.62	1.27	33.92		
Mesbah Ahdab	North II (Tripoli)	SU	"Independent Decision"		908	0.62	1.27	21.70		
George Bkassini	North II (Tripoli)	MA	"Future for the North"	Future	903	0.62	21.11	1.74		
Rabih Awad	Mount Lebanon I (Byblos)	SH	"Strong Lebanon"		891	0.77	7.71	1.63		
Nabil Bader	Beirut II	SU	"Beirut al-Watan"		854	0.59	0.94	11.42		
Ahmed Marwa	South II (Tyre)	SH	"Together for Change"		852	0.58	0.98	7.42		
Nicolas Chammas	Beirut I	GO	"Strong Beirut I"		851	1.95	12.71	4.63		
Maguy Aoun	Bekaa II	MA	"Civil Society"		847	1.27	25.91	54.79		Venus symbol
Naji Ghanem	Bekaa II	MA	"Best Tomorrow"		838	1.26	25.63	2.57		
Rania Ghaith	Mount Lebanon IV (Chouf)	DR	"Kulluna Watani" (We are all National) (Mount Lebanon IV)		831	0.49	2.89	8.32		Venus symbol
Paul Charbel	Bekaa I	MA	"Popular Bloc"	Popular Bloc	824	0.90	10.01	7.57		
Nima Mahfoud	North II (Tripoli)	GO	"Future for the North"	Future	800	0.55	31.72	1.54		
Zaher Khatib	Mount Lebanon IV (Chouf)	SU	"National Unity"	Toilers League	794	0.47	2.78	6.21		
Mahmoud Awad	Mount Lebanon I (Byblos)	SH	"Clear Change"		787	0.68	6.81	2.92		
Vicky Zouin	Mount Lebanon II	MA	"Kulluna Watani" (We are all National) (Mount Lebanon II)	Saaba	780	0.86	1.71	15.52		Venus symbol
Ali Hamada	Bekaa III	SH	"Development and Change"		780	0.42	0.60	19.25		
Abdallah Zakhem	North III (Koura)	GO	"With Us for the North and Lebanon"		779	0.67	2.96	1.91		
Samir Aoun	Mount Lebanon IV (Chouf)	MA	"Mountain Pledge"	SSNP	770	0.45	2.30	1.97		
Maher Abu Shaqra	Mount Lebanon IV (Chouf)	DR	"Kulluna Watani" (We are all National) (Mount Lebanon IV)		760	0.45	2.64	7.61		
Alaa Sabbagh	Mount Lebanon IV (Aley)	DR	"Kulluna Watani" (We are all National) (Mount Lebanon IV)		755	0.44	2.93	7.56		
Marie Claude Helou	Mount Lebanon III	MA	"Kulluna Watani" (We are all National) (Mount Lebanon III)	Saaba	755	0.96	1.94	15.12		Venus symbol
Rashid Mokhtam	North II (Tripoli)	SU	"Determination"	Azm Movement	746	0.51	1.04	1.78		
Amin Wahbi	Bekaa II	SH	"Future for West Bekaa"	Future	741	1.11	7.56	2.33	No	
Bassam Chab	Beirut II	EV	"Future for Beirut"	Future	735	0.51	20.47	1.17	No	
Josephine Zogheib	Mount Lebanon I (Kesrwan)	MA	"Kulluna Watani" (We are all National) (Mount Lebanon I)		728	0.63	1.20	28.82		Venus symbol
Paul Abi Rached	Mount Lebanon III	MA	"Together for Baabda"		726	0.93	1.87	12.59		
Mazin Shabu	Mount Lebanon IV (Chouf)	SU	"Free Decision"		724	0.42	2.53	13.29		
Joseph Wehbe	North I	GO	"Sovereign Lebanon" (North I)	Rifi Bloc	724	0.54	2.42	15.36		
Serg Gukhadarian	Beirut I	AC	"Strong Beirut I"	Tashnaq	717	1.64	13.09	3.90		
Moustafa Banbouk	Beirut II	SU	"Beirut al-Watan"	Al-Waqie Movement	699	0.49	0.77	9.35		
Corinne Achkar	Mount Lebanon II	MA	"Strong Metn"		696	0.77	1.53	1.79		Venus symbol
Selim Kallas	Bekaa III	GC	"Dignity and Development"		685	0.37	6.56	1.92		
Jamil Balout	South III (Nabatieh)	SH	"Kulluna Watani" (We are all National) (South III)	Saaba	680	0.30	0.87	30.06		
Tony Maroni	North II (Tripoli)	MA	"People's Decision"	FPM	675	0.46	15.78	16.38		
Rafat Shaaban	Mount Lebanon IV (Chouf)	SU	"Free Decision"		674	0.39	2.36	12.38		
Wajih Barini	North I	SU	"Decision for Akkar"	Akkari People's Gathering	665	0.50	0.96	4.60		
Mohamed Fleeti	Bekaa III	SU	"Independent"		660	0.35	3.05	12.07		
Shafiq Salama Radwan	Mount Lebanon IV (Aley)	DR	"National Unity"		660	0.39	2.56	5.16		
Michel Antonios Daher	North I	MA	"Decision for Akkar"		653	0.49	2.72	4.52		
Ghassan Maalouf	Bekaa I	GC	"Kulluna Watani" (We are all National) (Bekaa I)		651	0.71	1.84	40.71		
Oussama Amoun	North II (Dennieh)	SU	"Sovereign Lebanon" (North II)	Rifi Bloc	644	0.44	1.97	6.67		
Nihad Yazbek	Beirut II	EV	"We are All Beirut"		633	0.44	17.63	10.25		Venus symbol
Amin Edmon Rizk	South I (Jezzine)	MA	"Integration and Dignity"		632	0.96	2.52	3.84		
Marouf Itani	Beirut II	SU	"Lebnan Herzen"		632	0.44	0.70	4.01		
Emad Qazi	Mount Lebanon IV (Aley)	DR	"Kulluna Watani" (We are all National) (Mount Lebanon IV)		621	0.36	2.41	6.22		
Fadi Abu Jamra	South III (Marjayoun-Hasbaya)	GO	"Kulluna Watani" (We are all National) (South III)		615	0.27	6.34	27.19		
Nadine Itani	Beirut II	SU	"We are All Beirut"		612	0.43	0.68	9.91		Venus symbol
Khodr Tlayss	Bekaa III	SH	"Dignity and Development"		612	0.33	0.47	1.72		
Ali Ayoubi	North II (Tripoli)	SU	"Sovereign Lebanon" (North II)	Rifi Bloc	609	0.42	0.85	6.31		
Wajih Araji	Bekaa I	SU	"Zahle Options and Decisions"		592	0.65	5.70	2.51		
Nadim Souhaid	Mount Lebanon I (Byblos)	MA	"Kulluna Watani" (We are all National) (Mount Lebanon I)		590	0.51	1.45	23.36		
Mohammed Qadouh	South III (Bint Jbeil)	SH	"The South is Worth It"		586	0.26	0.94	3.44		
Joseph Karam	Mount Lebanon II	MA	"Pulse Metn"	NLP	580	0.64	1.27	3.05		
Antoine Fawaz	Mount Lebanon IV (Chouf)	GC	"Kulluna Watani" (We are all National) (Mount Lebanon IV)	LCP	577	0.34	4.63	5.78		
Saaduddin Hassan Khaled	Beirut II	SU	"Lebnan Herzen"		572	0.40	0.63	3.63		
Bashar Qowatli	Beirut II	SU	"Beirut al-Watan"		570	0.40	0.63	7.63		
Khodr Habib	North I	AL	"Future of Akkar"	Future	561	0.42	8.58	0.73	No	
Michel Fattouch	Bekaa I	GC	"Zahle is Our Cause"		552	0.60	1.56	2.95		
Adnan Marab	North I	SU	"Decision for Akkar"		551	0.41	0.79	3.81		
Ibrahim Maraab	North I	SU	"Sovereign Lebanon" (North I)	Rifi Bloc	545	0.41	0.79	11.56		
Ragheb Raad	North II (Dennieh)	SU	"Sovereign Lebanon" (North II)	Rifi Bloc	537	0.37	1.65	5.56		
Yorgui Teyrouz	Beirut I	AC	"Kulluna Watani" (We are all National) (Beirut I)	LiBaladi	536	1.23	9.78	7.83		
Mikhael Ramouz	Mount Lebanon II	GC	"Pulse Metn"		532	0.59	4.91	2.80		
Nassif Tini	Bekaa I	GO	"Zahle Options and Decisions"	SSNP	528	0.58	6.03	2.24		
Joseph Eid	Mount Lebanon IV (Chouf)	MA	"Free Decision"	Kataeb	524	0.31	1.56	9.62		
Gilberte Zouein	Mount Lebanon I (Kesrwan)	MA	"Anna al-Qarar"		521	0.45	0.86	2.81	No	Venus symbol
Hussein Masri	North I	SU	"Decision for Akkar"		518	0.39	0.75	3.59		
Seybou Makhjian	Beirut I	AO	"We are Beirut"		517	1.18	4.56	40.64		
Rifaat Masri	Bekaa III	SH	"Dignity and Development"		504	0.27	0.39	1.42		
Lina Husseini	South II (Tyre)	SH	"Together for Change"		501	0.34	0.58	4.36		Venus symbol
Marwan Halawi	Mount Lebanon IV (Chouf)	DR	"Mountain Pledge"	LDP	495	0.29	1.72	1.27		
Adel Zreika	North II (Minnieh)	SU	"National Dignity"	Dignity Movement)	494	0.34	2.45	1.70		
Fadi Rouhana Sakr	Mount Lebanon I (Byblos)	MA	"Clear Change"		481	0.42	1.19	1.78		
Omar Wakim	Beirut II	GO	"Voice of the People"	People's Movement	476	0.33	8.23	35.55		
Joseph Nahra	South I (Jezzine)	MA	"Capacity of Change"	Kataeb	472	0.72	1.88	7.57		
Rima Hamid	South III (Bint Jbeil)	SH	"Kulluna Watani" (We are all National) (South III)	Saaba	471	0.21	0.76	20.82		Venus symbol
Carlos Abu Nader	Mount Lebanon I (Kesrwan)	MA	"National Solidarity"		470	0.41	0.77	3.74		
Salah Harake	Mount Lebanon III	SH	"Unity and Development of Baabda"		468	0.60	2.10	1.77		
Fadwa Nassif	North III (Koura)	GO	"Kulluna Watani" (We are all National) (North III)	Saaba	463	0.40	1.76	14.65		Venus symbol
Imad Hajj	Mount Lebanon IV (Aley)	MA	"Mountain Pledge"		457	0.27	2.17	1.17		
Emile Kanaan	Mount Lebanon II	MA	"Kulluna Watani" (We are all National) (Mount Lebanon II)		457	0.51	1.00	9.09		
George Abboud	Mount Lebanon II	GC	"Metn Loyalty"		454	0.50	4.19	3.29		
Farah Issa	North II (Tripoli)	GO	"Kulluna Watani" (We are all National) (North II)		452	0.31	17.92	16.87		Venus symbol
Mirfat Hawz	North II (Tripoli)	SU	"Determination"	Azm Movement	452	0.31	0.63	1.08		Venus symbol
Robert Khoury	South I (Jezzine)	GC	"Integration and Dignity"		449	0.68	8.04	2.73		
Mellad Sabali	Mount Lebanon II	MA	"Metn Loyalty"	SSNP (Intifada)	446	0.49	0.98	3.24		
Karl Melham	Mount Lebanon IV (Aley)	MA	"Kulluna Watani" (We are all National) (Mount Lebanon IV)		445	0.26	2.11	4.46		
Leila Chahoud	North II (Tripoli)	AL	"Future for the North"	Future	443	0.30	7.15	0.85		Venus symbol
Ziad Bitar	North I	MA	"Sovereign Lebanon" (North I)	Rifi Bloc	442	0.33	1.84	9.38		
Albert Androus	North III (Koura)	GO	"Strong Republic Pulse"	Kataeb	442	0.38	1.68	1.18		
Avedis Dakessian	Beirut I	AO	"Beirut I"	Ramgavar	437	1.00	3.86	2.61		
Joumana Haddad	Beirut I	MI	"Kulluna Watani" (We are all National) (Beirut I)	LiBaladi	431	0.99	27.28	6.30		Venus symbol
Souhail Khalil Bajani	Mount Lebanon IV (Aley)	MA	"National Unity"		430	0.25	2.04	3.36		
Riad Akel	Beirut I	MI	"Beirut I"	Lebanese Forces	428	0.98	27.09	2.55		
Fatima Moshref	Beirut II	SU	"We are All Beirut"		423	0.29	0.47	6.85		Venus symbol
Abdallah Chall	Bekaa III	SU	"Development and Change"		416	0.22	1.92	10.26		
Nadim Osseiran	South III (Nabatieh)	SH	"The South is Worth It"		398	0.18	0.51	2.33		
Joseph Wanis	Mount Lebanon III	MA	"Kulluna Watani" (We are all National) (Mount Lebanon III)		394	0.50	1.01	7.89		
Nadine Mousa	Mount Lebanon II	MA	"Kulluna Watani" (We are all National) (Mount Lebanon II)		394	0.44	0.87	7.84		Venus symbol
Mohammed Rustam	North I	AL	"Sovereign Lebanon" (North I)	Rifi Bloc	383	0.29	5.85	8.13		
Bader Ismail	North I	SU	"Sovereign Lebanon" (North I)	Rifi Bloc	380	0.28	0.55	8.06		
Basem Khalid	North I	SU	"Decision of Akkar"		379	0.28	0.55	18.65		
Michelle Tueni	Beirut I	GO	"We are Beirut"		376	0.86	5.62	29.56		Venus symbol
Maya Terro	Mount Lebanon IV (Chouf)	SU	"Civic"		373	0.22	1.31	12.79		Venus symbol
Mazen Skaf	Mount Lebanon II	GO	"Pulse Metn"		366	0.40	1.54	1.93		
Bassam Ghantous	North III (Koura)	GO	"Kulluna Watani" (We are all National) (North III)	Saaba	352	0.30	1.34	11.14		
Ali Omar	North I	SU	"Decision of Akkar"	Resistance Movement	347	0.26	0.50	17.08		
Walid Masri	North II (Minnieh)	SU	"Sovereign Lebanon" (North II)	Rifi Bloc	344	0.23	1.70	3.56		
Khalil Hrawi	Bekaa I	MA	"Zahle Options and Decisions"		343	0.37	4.17	1.46		
Ali Zuaiter	Bekaa III	SH	"Development and Change"		336	0.18	0.26	8.29		
Omar Ghandour	Beirut II	SU	"Unity of Beirut"	Islamic Action Front	329	0.23	0.36	0.70		
Lucien Bourjeily	Beirut I	GC	"Kulluna Watani" (We are all National) (Beirut I)	You Stink	328	0.75	3.94	4.79		
Youssef Salame	Mount Lebanon I (Kesrwan)	MA	"Kulluna Watani" (We are all National) (Mount Lebanon I)		327	0.28	0.54	12.95		
Adeeb Tohmah	Mount Lebanon II	MA	"Kulluna Watani" (We are all National) (Mount Lebanon II)		326	0.36	0.72	6.48		
Ziad Antoine Choueiri	Mount Lebanon IV (Chouf)	MA	"National Unity"		324	0.19	0.97	2.53		
Rania Bassil	Mount Lebanon I (Byblos)	MA	"Kulluna Watani" (We are all National) (Mount Lebanon I)		323	0.28	0.80	12.79		Venus symbol
Abdel Salam Trad	North II (Dennieh)	SU	"Independent Decision"		322	0.22	0.99	7.70		
Saad Wazzan	Beirut II	SU	"Beirut al-Watan"		321	0.22	0.35	4.29		
Elias Abdel Salam Baraj	Mount Lebanon IV (Chouf)	SU	"National Unity"		314	0.18	1.10	2.45		
Zeina Kallab	Mount Lebanon I (Kesrwan)	MA	"National Solidarity"		308	0.27	0.51	2.45		Venus symbol
Salah Salam	Beirut II	SU	"Beirut al-Watan"		308	0.21	0.34	4.12		
Ghassan Moghbab	Mount Lebanon IV (Chouf)	GC	"Free Decision"		307	0.18	2.46	5.64		
George Mansour	North III (Koura)	GO	"Strong Republic Pulse"	Democratic Left	305	0.26	1.16	0.82		
Mazen Nasruddin	Mount Lebanon IV (Chouf)	SU	"Kulluna Watani" (We are all National) (Mount Lebanon IV)		305	0.18	1.07	3.05		
Malek Moulawi	North II (Tripoli)	SU	"Kulluna Watani" (We are all National) (North II)		299	0.20	0.42	11.16		
Dany Othman	North II (Dennieh)	SU	"Kulluna Watani" (We are all National) (North II)		297	0.20	0.91	11.08		
Saeed Halabi	Beirut II	DR	"Beirut al-Watan"		295	0.21	10.57	3.95		
Riad Ghazala	North III (Zgharta)	MA	"Kulluna Watani" (We are all National) (North III)		293	0.25	0.85	9.27		
Hanna Habib	Bekaa I	MA	"Kulluna Watani" (We are all National) (Bekaa I)		287	0.31	3.49	17.95		
Najwa Azar	Mount Lebanon II	MA	"Metn Loyalty"		285	0.32	0.63	2.07		Venus symbol
Mahmoud Shehadeh	North II (Tripoli)	AL	"People's Decision"		282	0.19	4.55	6.84		
Tawfiq Sultan	North II (Tripoli)	SU	"Determination"	Azm Movement	281	0.19	0.39	0.67		
Badr Eid	North II (Tripoli)	AL	"Sovereign Lebanon" (North II)	Rifi Bloc	277	0.19	4.47	2.87		
Numan Murad	Mount Lebanon I (Kesrwan)	MA	"Clear Change"		274	0.24	0.45	1.02		
Nicolas Saba	Bekaa I	GO	"Popular Bloc"	Popular Bloc	271	0.30	3.09	2.49		
Mohamed Salhab	North II (Tripoli)	SU	"Sovereign Lebanon" (North II)	Rifi Bloc	269	0.18	0.38	2.79		
Vanda Chedid	Bekaa I	GO	"Kulluna Watani" (We are all National) (Bekaa I)	Green	268	0.29	3.06	16.76		Venus symbol
Joseph Zayek	Mount Lebanon I (Kesrwan)	MA	"National Solidarity"		263	0.23	0.43	2.10		
Ziad Itani	Beirut II	SU	"Beiruti Opposition"	Rifi Bloc	263	0.18	0.29	47.56		
Mohammad Hajj Sleiman	Bekaa III	SH	"Dignity and Development"		262	0.14	0.20	0.74		
Rock Mehanna	Mount Lebanon I (Kesrwan)	MA	"Clear Change"		259	0.22	0.43	0.96		
Jamal Badawi	North II (Tripoli)	SU	"Independent Civil Society"		258	0.18	0.36	57.59		
Mohammed Walid Qamaruddin	North II (Tripoli)	SU	"Sovereign Lebanon" (North II)	Rifi Bloc	249	0.17	0.35	2.58		
Mohamed Mekdad	Mount Lebanon I (Byblos)	SH	"Kulluna Watani" (We are all National) (Mount Lebanon I)	LCP	247	0.21	2.14	9.78		
Antoine Yamin	North III (Zgharta)	MA	"Kulluna Watani" (We are all National) (North III)	Saaba	243	0.21	0.70	7.69		
Nada Gharib	Mount Lebanon II	MA	"Pulse Metn"	Green	242	0.27	0.53	1.27		Venus symbol
Zeina Mounzer	Beirut II	DR	"Lebnan Herzen"		237	0.16	8.49	1.50		Venus symbol
Ali Hermoush	North II (Dennieh)	SU	"People's Decision"		229	0.16	0.70	5.56		
Jean Hawat	Mount Lebanon I (Byblos)	MA	"Anna al-Qarar"		229	0.20	0.56	1.23		
Fadi Khoury	Mount Lebanon IV (Aley)	MA	"Civic"		228	0.13	1.08	7.82		
Muhammad Shatila	Beirut II	SU	"Dignity of Beirut"		227	0.16	0.25	23.38		
Raja Zuhairi	Beirut II	DR	"Dignity of Beirut"		223	0.16	7.99	22.97		
Michel Keyrouz	Mount Lebanon I (Kesrwan)	MA	"National Solidarity"		222	0.19	0.37	1.77		
Yousef Beydoun	Beirut II	SH	"Lebnan Herzen"		221	0.15	0.62	1.40		
Laury Haytayan	Beirut I	AO	"Kulluna Watani" (We are all National) (Beirut I)	LiBaladi	218	0.50	1.92	3.19		Venus symbol
Olfat Sabeh	Mount Lebanon III	SH	"Together for Baabda"		216	0.28	0.97	3.74		Venus symbol
Abdel Nasser Masri	North II (Tripoli)	SU	"National Dignity"	Lebanese People's Congress	215	0.15	0.30	0.74		
Mohammed Baasiri	Beirut II	SU	"Unity of Beirut"		205	0.14	0.23	0.44		
Houd Taaimi	Bekaa I	SU	"Kulluna Watani" (We are all National) (Bekaa I)		201	0.22	1.93	12.57		
Cynthia Asmar	Mount Lebanon III	MA	"Unity and Development of Baabda"		200	0.25	0.51	0.75		Venus symbol
Mohamed Ahmed	North II (Minnieh)	SU	"Independent Decision"		199	0.14	0.98	4.76		
Bassam Hachem	Mount Lebanon I (Byblos)	MA	"National Solidarity"		199	0.17	0.49	1.59		
Khaled Tadmori	North II (Tripoli)	SU	"Sovereign Lebanon" (North II)	Rifi Bloc	199	0.14	0.28	2.06		
Ibrahim Halabi	Beirut II	SU	"Voice of the People"	People's Movement	195	0.14	0.22	14.56		
Michel Douaihy	North III (Zgharta)	MA	"Strong Republic Pulse"	Kataeb	194	0.17	0.56	0.52		
Abbas Yaghi	Bekaa III	SH	"Development and Change"		193	0.10	0.15	4.76		
Khalid Roumieh	North II (Tripoli)	SU	"People's Decision"		192	0.13	0.27	4.66		
George Aoun	Mount Lebanon IV (Chouf)	MA	"Kulluna Watani" (We are all National) (Mount Lebanon IV)		190	0.11	0.57	1.90		
Sami Hamada	Mount Lebanon IV (Chouf)	DR	"Free Decision"		188	0.11	0.65	3.45		
Said Issa	South III (Marjayoun-Hasbaya)	SU	"A Vote for Change"		187	0.08	1.27	3.17		
Gisele Hachem Zard	Mount Lebanon II	MA	"Metn Heart of Lebanon"		185	0.20	0.41	1.41		Venus symbol
Patricia Elias	Mount Lebanon I (Kesrwan)	MA	"Clear Change"		183	0.16	0.30	0.68		Venus symbol
Sharbel Abu Joudeh	Mount Lebanon II	MA	"Metn Loyalty"		182	0.20	0.40	1.32		
Lina Moukheiber	Mount Lebanon II	GO	"Metn Heart of Lebanon"		178	0.20	0.75	1.35		Venus symbol
Violette Ghazal Balaa	Mount Lebanon II	GO	"Pulse Metn"		178	0.20	0.75	0.94		Venus symbol
Ahmed Ismail	South III (Nabatieh)	SH	"Shibna Hakki"		177	0.08	0.23	3.76		
George Chaqir	Beirut II	GO	"Beirut al-Watan"		175	0.12	3.03	2.34		
George Rahbani	Mount Lebanon II	GO	"Kulluna Watani" (We are all National) (Mount Lebanon II)	Saaba	175	0.19	0.73	3.48		
Chukri Haddad	Mount Lebanon IV (Chouf)	GC	"Civic"		173	0.10	1.39	5.93		
Osama Salhab	Bekaa I	SH	"Popular Bloc"	Popular Bloc	172	0.19	0.86	1.58		
Antoine Bou Melhab	Mount Lebanon IV (Aley)	MA	"Free Decision"	NLP	172	0.10	0.82	3.16		
Da'id Qazi	Mount Lebanon IV (Chouf)	MA	"Free Decision"	NLP	172	0.10	0.51	3.16		Venus symbol
Chucri Moukarzel	Mount Lebanon II	MA	"Metn Heart of Lebanon"		171	0.19	0.38	1.30		
Youssef Khalil	Mount Lebanon I (Kesrwan)	MA	"Anna al-Qarar"		171	0.15	0.28	0.92	No	
Nadim Costa	Beirut II	EV	"Lebnan Herzen"		169	0.12	4.71	1.07		
Rana Chemaitelly	Beirut II	SU	"Lebnan Herzen"		169	0.12	0.19	1.07		Venus symbol
Alaa Chamali	Bekaa II	SU	"Civil Society"		168	0.25	0.52	10.87		
Akram Qais	South III (Marjayoun-Hasbaya)	DR	"Kulluna Watani" (We are all National) (South III)		166	0.07	1.82	7.34		
Ahmed Assaad	South III (Nabatieh)	SH	"We Change"	Lebanese Option	165	0.07	0.21	25.04		
Issam Barghout	Beirut II	SU	"Lebnan Herzen"		164	0.11	0.18	1.04		
Fadi Younis	Bekaa III	SH	"Independent"		164	0.09	0.13	3.00		
Ali Sobh	Bekaa II	SH	"Civil Society"		162	0.24	1.65	10.48		
Hisham Jaber	South III (Nabatieh)	SH	"The South is Worth It"		162	0.07	0.21	0.95		
Yeghisheh Andonian	Mount Lebanon II	AO	"Pulse Metn"		160	0.18	2.13	0.84		
Ghada Assaf	Bekaa III	SH	"Independent"	FPM	159	0.08	0.12	2.91		Venus symbol
Nidal Skaf	North I	GO	"Women of Akkar"		158	0.12	0.53	31.73		Venus symbol
Ara Koyounian	Mount Lebanon II	AO	"Metn Heart of Lebanon"	Ramgavar	156	0.17	2.08	1.19		
Rafic Bazerji	Beirut I	MI	"We are Beirut"	NLP	153	0.35	9.68	12.03		
Khaled Aref Khadaj	Mount Lebanon IV (Aley)	DR	"National Unity"	Arab Unification Party	153	0.09	0.59	1.20		
Naamat Badruddin	Beirut II	SH	"Voice of the People"		153	0.11	0.43	11.43		Venus symbol
Rami Ollaik	South III (Nabatieh)	SH	"Shibna Hakki"		153	0.07	0.20	3.25		
Joseph Ayoub	Bekaa II	GO	"Civil Society"		150	0.23	2.48	9.70		
Antonia Ghamra	North III (Zgharta)	MA	"Kulluna Watani" (We are all National) (North III)		149	0.13	0.43	4.72		Venus symbol
Abbas Sorour	South III (Bint Jbeil)	SH	"A Vote for Change"		149	0.07	0.24	2.53		
Rami Hamadeh	Mount Lebanon IV (Chouf)	DR	"Civic"		147	0.09	0.51	5.04		
Ahmed Shandab	North II (Dennieh)	SU	"People's Decision"		146	0.10	0.45	3.54		
Ghaleb Yaghi	Bekaa III	SH	"Dignity and Development"		145	0.08	0.11	0.41		
Boughous Kordian	Bekaa I	AO	"Zahle is Our Cause"		142	0.15	2.40	0.76		
Kamal Khazal	North I	SU	"Decision of Akkar"		140	0.10	0.20	6.89		
Marwan Matani	Mount Lebanon IV (Chouf)	MA	"Civic"		134	0.08	0.40	4.60		
Ziad Khalifa	Mount Lebanon I (Kesrwan)	MA	"Clear Change"	NLP	134	0.12	0.22	0.50		
Elhan Farahat	Mount Lebanon IV (Chouf)	DR	"Free Decision"		132	0.08	0.46	2.42		
Chawki Fakhri	Bekaa III	MA	"Development and Change"		131	0.07	0.69	3.23		
Jihad Yusuf	North II (Dennieh)	SU	"Determination"	Azm Movement	131	0.09	0.40	0.31		
Mohammad Monzer Maaliki	North II (Tripoli)	SU	"Kulluna Watani" (We are all National) (North II)	Lebanon Vanguard	131	0.09	0.18	4.89		
Tony Khalifa	North II (Tripoli)	MA	"Independent Decision"		129	0.09	3.02	3.08		
Sandrella Merhej	Bekaa III	MA	"Independent"		128	0.07	0.67	2.34		Venus symbol
Mohammed Safouh Yakan	North II (Tripoli)	SU	"National Dignity"	National Gathering	127	0.09	0.18	0.44		
Youssef Tabash	Beirut II	SU	"Voice of the People"	Mourabitoun	127	0.09	0.14	9.48		
Carole Babikian	Beirut I	AO	"Beirut I"		124	0.28	1.09	0.74		Venus symbol
Mikhael Mikhael	Beirut II	GO	"Dignity of Beirut"		123	0.09	2.13	12.67		
Edmond Touk	North III (Bcharre)	MA	"Kulluna Watani" (We are all National) (North III)	Saaba	122	0.11	0.65	3.86		
Rola Murad	North I	SU	"Women of Akkar"		119	0.09	0.17	23.90		Venus symbol
Ali Darwish	Mount Lebanon III	SH	"Kulluna Watani" (We are all National) (Mount Lebanon III)	Citizens in the State	118	0.15	0.53	2.36		
Nemeh Ibrahim	North III (Batroun)	MA	"Strong North"	FPM	118	0.10	0.37	0.35		
Levon Telvizian	Beirut I	AO	"Kulluna Watani" (We are all National) (Beirut I)	LiBaladi	114	0.26	1.01	1.67		
Joseph Adaimi	Mount Lebanon III	MA	"Unity and Development of Baabda"		114	0.15	0.29	0.43		
Faisal Husseini	Bekaa III	SH	"Independent"		114	0.06	0.09	2.08		
As'ad Edmon Abu Jouda	Mount Lebanon IV (Chouf)	MA	"National Unity"		112	0.07	0.33	0.88		
Douri Dou	Mount Lebanon I (Kesrwan)	MA	"Kulluna Watani" (We are all National) (Mount Lebanon I)		112	0.10	0.18	4.43		
Hussein Baydoun	South III (Bint Jbeil)	SH	"A Vote for Change"		112	0.05	0.18	1.90		
Marwan Tibi	Beirut II	SU	"We are All Beirut"		112	0.08	0.12	1.81		
Hamad Dib	Bekaa III	SH	"National Cedars"		112	0.06	0.09	22.81		
Amer Sabouri	Bekaa I	SH	"Zahle is Our Cause"		111	0.12	0.56	0.59		
Naji Kodeih	Beirut II	SH	"We are All Beirut"		111	0.08	0.31	1.80		
Nariman Chamaa	North II (Tripoli)	SU	"Kulluna Watani" (We are all National) (North II)		111	0.08	0.16	4.14		Venus symbol
Leila Tannoury	Bekaa III	MA	"National Cedars"		109	0.06	0.57	22.20		Venus symbol
Jawad Boulos	North III (Zgharta)	MA	"Strong North"	Independence Movement	109	0.09	0.32	0.33		
Khalid Mumtaz	Beirut II	SU	"Birutah al-Mustaqilin"		108	0.08	0.12	26.34		
Moussa Khoury	North II (Tripoli)	MA	"Kulluna Watani" (We are all National) (North II)		106	0.07	2.48	3.96		
Mazen Abu Dergham	Mount Lebanon IV (Chouf)	DR	"Mountain Pledge"	LDP	106	0.06	0.37	0.27		
Faisal Rahal	Bekaa II	SU	"Civil Society"		106	0.16	0.33	6.86		
Elias Gharib	Mount Lebanon IV (Chouf)	MA	"Civic"		105	0.06	0.31	3.60		
Said Alameh	Mount Lebanon III	SH	"Together for Baabda"		103	0.13	0.46	1.79		
Ayman Nouruddin Omar	North II (Tripoli)	SU	"National Dignity"		99	0.07	0.14	0.34		
Ghassan Hadifa	South III (Marjayoun-Hasbaya)	DR	"A Vote for Change"	LCP	97	0.04	1.06	1.65		
Greta Saab	North III (Koura)	GO	"Strong North"	FPM	97	0.08	0.37	0.29		Venus symbol
Wathek Moukaddam	North II (Tripoli)	SU	"Kulluna Watani" (We are all National) (North II)		97	0.07	0.14	3.62		
Nicolas Amorri	Bekaa I	GC	"Popular Bloc"	Popular Bloc	95	0.10	0.27	0.87		
Abeer Ramadhan	South III (Marjayoun-Hasbaya)	SH	"We Change"	Lebanese Option	93	0.04	0.21	14.11		Venus symbol
Hani Fayyad	Beirut II	DR	"Voice of the People"	SSNP (Intifada)	90	0.06	3.22	6.72		
Khaled Hamoud	Beirut II	SU	"Dignity of Beirut"		90	0.06	0.10	9.27		
Antoine Khoury Harb	North III (Batroun)	MA	"Kulluna Watani" (We are all National) (North III)		88	0.08	0.28	2.78		
Abdel Karim Itani	Beirut II	SU	"Birutah al-Mustaqilin"		87	0.06	0.10	21.22		
George Jalad	North II (Tripoli)	GO	"Sovereign Lebanon" (North II)	Rifi Bloc	86	0.06	3.41	0.89		
Ali Farouk Samad	North II (Dennieh)	SU	"Independent Decision"		84	0.06	0.26	2.01		
Abbas Sharafuddin	South III (Marjayoun-Hasbaya)	SH	"The South is Worth It"		79	0.03	0.18	0.46		
Yolanda Khoury	Mount Lebanon I (Kesrwan)	MA	"Anna al-Qarar"		78	0.07	0.13	0.42		Venus symbol
Ajwad Ayach	Mount Lebanon III	DR	"Together for Baabda"		77	0.10	0.51	1.33		
Mohammad Qadi	Beirut II	SU	"Dignity of Beirut"		77	0.05	0.08	7.93		
George Boutros	North III (Bcharre)	MA	"Strong North"	FPM	76	0.07	0.41	0.23		
Ghoulay Assaad	North I	SU	"Women of Akkar"		75	0.06	0.11	15.06		Venus symbol
Maurice Koura	North III (Bcharre)	MA	"Kulluna Watani" (We are all National) (North III)	Saaba	73	0.06	0.39	2.31		
Akram Sinno	Beirut II	SU	"Beiruti Opposition"	Rifi Bloc	72	0.05	0.08	13.02		
Saad Hamadeh	Bekaa III	SH	"Independent"		72	0.04	0.06	1.32		
Dalal Rahbani	Beirut II	EV	"Beirut al-Watan"		71	0.05	1.98	0.95		Venus symbol
Mohammad Hassan	Bekaa I	SH	"Kulluna Watani" (We are all National) (Bekaa I)		71	0.08	0.36	4.44		
Salah Nouruddin	South III (Bint Jbeil)	SH	"Kulluna Watani" (We are all National) (South III)		71	0.03	0.11	3.14		
Sami Ramah	Mount Lebanon IV (Aley)	DR	"Free Decision"		69	0.04	0.27	1.27		
Mohammed Faraj	South III (Bint Jbeil)	SH	"We Change"	Lebanese Option	69	0.03	0.11	10.47		
Hisham Ibrahim (Al Moaie)	North II (Tripoli)	AL	"Independent Decision"		68	0.05	1.10	1.63		
Mourhaf Ramadan	South III (Marjayoun-Hasbaya)	SH	"The South is Worth It"		67	0.03	0.15	0.39		
Joseph Zougheib	Mount Lebanon I (Kesrwan)	MA	"National Solidarity"		64	0.06	0.11	0.51		
Mehdi Zogheib	Bekaa III	SH	"Independent"		64	0.03	0.05	1.17		
Mahmoud Kareidiya	Beirut II	SU	"Lebnan Herzen"		62	0.04	0.07	0.39		
Ibrahim Chamseddine	Beirut II	SH	"Beirut al-Watan"		61	0.04	0.17	0.82		
Minah Saab	South III (Marjayoun-Hasbaya)	GO	"We Change"	Lebanese Option	60	0.03	0.62	9.10		
Lina Hamdan	Beirut II	SH	"Beiruti Opposition"	Rifi Bloc	58	0.04	0.16	10.49		Venus symbol
Hanan Osman	Beirut II	SU	"Voice of the People"		57	0.04	0.06	4.26		Venus symbol
Eliane Qazi	Mount Lebanon IV (Chouf)	MA	"Civic"		56	0.03	0.17	1.92		Venus symbol
Roula Houry	Beirut II	SU	"Voice of the People"		54	0.04	0.06	4.03		Venus symbol
Ali Sbeiti	Beirut II	SH	"Dignity of Beirut"		53	0.04	0.15	5.46		
Nastas Koshary	North II (Tripoli)	GO	"People's Decision"		52	0.04	2.06	1.26		
Adel Mohammad Bayan	Bekaa III	SU	"National Cedars"		52	0.03	0.24	10.59		
Hanan Sha'ar	Beirut II	SU	"Dignity of Beirut"		52	0.04	0.06	5.36		Venus symbol
Jihad Matar	Beirut II	SU	"Dignity of Beirut"		52	0.04	0.06	5.36		
Nabil Sebaaly	Beirut II	EV	"Voice of the People"		51	0.04	1.42	3.81		
Ahmed Douhaiby	North II (Minnieh)	SU	"Kulluna Watani" (We are all National) (North II)		51	0.03	0.25	1.90		
Ahmed Bayan	Bekaa III	SU	"Independent"		51	0.03	0.24	0.93		
Fouad Maoula	Bekaa III	SH	"National Cedars"		49	0.03	0.04	9.98		
Hassan Hassan Khalil	North II (Tripoli)	AL	"Independent Civil Society"		47	0.03	0.76	10.49		
Mary Khoury	North I	MA	"Women of Akkar"		46	0.03	0.19	9.24		Venus symbol
Suad Salah	North I	SU	"Women of Akkar"		46	0.03	0.07	9.24		Venus symbol
Yassine Kadado	Beirut II	SU	"Beiruti Opposition"	Rifi Bloc	46	0.03	0.05	8.32		
Walid Shatila	Beirut II	SU	"Birutah al-Mustaqilin"		44	0.03	0.05	10.73		
Menzeh Sawan	North II (Tripoli)	GO	"Independent Decision"		43	0.03	1.70	1.03		
Halim Zani	North II (Tripoli)	MA	"Sovereign Lebanon" (North II)	Rifi Bloc	43	0.03	1.01	0.45		
Khaldoun Chreif	Bekaa III	SH	"National Cedars"		42	0.02	0.03	8.55		
Nariman Jamal	North II (Tripoli)	SU	"Independent Decision"		41	0.03	0.06	0.98		Venus symbol
George Sfeir	Beirut I	MA	"We are Beirut"		40	0.09	0.45	3.14		
Fares Manaimna	Beirut II	SU	"Voice of the People"		40	0.03	0.04	2.99		
Serge Torsarkissian	Beirut I	AC	"We are Beirut"		39	0.09	0.71	3.07	No	
Imad Komeyha	South III (Marjayoun-Hasbaya)	SH	"Shibna Hakki"		39	0.02	0.09	0.83		
Suleiman Rajaili	Mount Lebanon IV (Chouf)	GC	"National Unity"		38	0.02	0.30	0.30		
Leon Sioufi	Beirut II	GO	"Birutah al-Mustaqilin"		37	0.03	0.64	9.02		
Waed Succariyeh	Bekaa III	SU	"National Cedars"		37	0.02	0.17	7.54		Venus symbol
Abbas Assaf	Bekaa III	SH	"National Cedars"		37	0.02	0.03	7.54		
Zeinelddine Dib	North II (Tripoli)	AL	"Kulluna Watani" (We are all National) (North II)		36	0.02	0.58	1.34		
Angel Khawand	South I (Jezzine)	MA	"Integration and Dignity"		36	0.05	0.14	0.22		Venus symbol
Abdel Kader Bsat	South I (Saida)	SU	"For All People"		36	0.05	0.11	0.16		
Bchara Khairallah	Beirut II	GO	"Beiruti Opposition"	Rifi Bloc	34	0.02	0.59	6.15		
Fadi Jamal	North II (Tripoli)	GO	"Independent Civil Society"		32	0.02	1.27	7.14		
Youssef Hanna Skaf	South I (Jezzine)	GC	"For All People"		31	0.05	0.55	0.14		
Kayssar Moawad	North III (Zgharta)	MA	"Strong Republic Pulse"		31	0.03	0.09	0.08		
Salwa Khalil	Beirut II	SH	"Beirut al-Watan"		31	0.02	0.09	0.41		Venus symbol
Adnan Khatib	South III (Marjayoun-Hasbaya)	SU	"We Change"	Lebanese Option	30	0.01	0.20	4.55		
Faten Zain	Beirut II	SU	"Voice of the People"		30	0.02	0.03	2.24		Venus symbol
Gina Chammas	Beirut I	MI	"Loyalty to Beirut"		29	0.07	1.84	30.85		Venus symbol
Andera Zouheiri	Beirut II	DR	"Birutah al-Mustaqilin"		29	0.02	1.04	7.07		Venus symbol
Heba Naja	North II (Tripoli)	SU	"Independent Civil Society"		27	0.02	0.04	6.03		Venus symbol
Rui Issa Khoury	North III (Bcharre)	MA	"With Us for the North and Lebanon"		25	0.02	0.13	0.06		
Amer Iskandarani	Beirut II	SU	"Beiruti Opposition"	Rifi Bloc	25	0.02	0.03	4.52		
Khuloud Wattar	Beirut II	SU	"Dignity of Beirut"		24	0.02	0.03	2.47		Venus symbol
Rojah Shuiri	Beirut I	MA	"Loyalty to Beirut"		23	0.05	0.26	24.47		
Elena Cloxian	Beirut I	AO	"Beirut I"	Ramgavar	23	0.05	0.20	0.14		Venus symbol
Antoine Qalaijian	Beirut I	AC	"Loyalty to Beirut"		20	0.05	0.37	21.28		
Abdel Rahman Gilani	Beirut II	SU	"Birutah al-Mustaqilin"		20	0.01	0.02	4.88		
Jihad Hammoud	Beirut II	SH	"Birutah al-Mustaqilin"		19	0.01	0.05	4.63		
Ayman Jamal	North II (Dennieh)	SU	"Independent Civil Society"		18	0.01	0.06	4.02		
Abdallah Salman	South III (Bint Jbeil)	SH	"We Change"	Lebanese Option	17	0.01	0.03	2.58		
Khalid Hanqir	Beirut II	SU	"Birutah al-Mustaqilin"		16	0.01	0.02	3.90		
Zeina Mansour	Beirut II	DR	"Beiruti Opposition"	Rifi Bloc	15	0.01	0.54	2.71		Venus symbol
Abdallah Rifai	North II (Minnieh)	SU	"Independent Civil Society"		13	0.01	0.06	2.90		
Mohammad Hamiye	Bekaa III	SH	"Dignity and Development"		13	0.01	0.01	0.04		
Fadi Zarazir	Beirut II	EV	"Birutah al-Mustaqilin"		12	0.01	0.33	2.93		
Wisam Akush	Beirut II	SH	"Birutah al-Mustaqilin"		9	0.01	0.03	2.20		
Mohammad Raad	Bekaa III	SH	"National Cedars"		9	0.00	0.01	1.83		
Robert Obeid	Beirut I	GO	"Loyalty to Beirut"		7	0.02	0.10	7.45		
Rabah Abi Haidar	South III (Marjayoun-Hasbaya)	SH	"We Change"	Lebanese Option	7	0.00	0.02	1.06		
Safiyah Zaza	Beirut II	SU	"Beiruti Opposition"	Rifi Bloc	7	0.00	0.01	1.27		Venus symbol
Mohammad Ghassan Moustapha Chall	Bekaa III	SH	"National Cedars"		7	0.00	0.01	1.43		
Kanaj Alimuddin	South III (Marjayoun-Hasbaya)	DR	"We Change"	Lebanese Option	5	0.00	0.05	0.76		
Saadallah Ardo	Bekaa III	GC	"National Cedars"	Kataeb	5	0.00	0.05	1.02		
Samah Arja	North II (Dennieh)	SU	"Independent Civil Society"		5	0.00	0.02	1.12		Venus symbol

== See also ==
- 2018 Lebanese general election
- 2022 Lebanese general election
