= Rola Tabash =

Lebanese politician

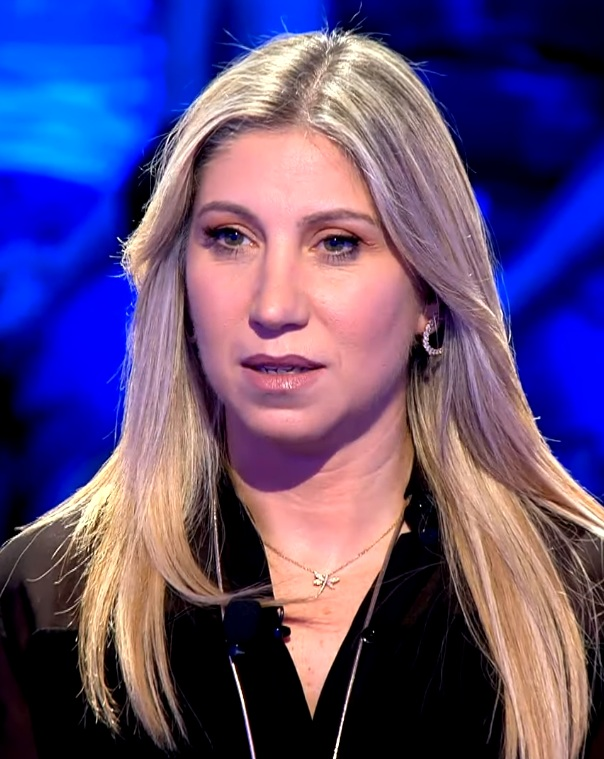
Rola Tabash on MTV Lebanon in September 2019.

Rola Al-Tabash Jaroudi is a Lebanese politician from the Future Movement who was elected to the Parliament of Lebanon in 2018. She didn't stand for re-election in the 2022 general election.

== See also ==
- Candidates of the 2018 Lebanese general election
