= Chadi Massaad =

Lebanese politician and architect (born 1959)

Chadi Georges Massaad is an architect and a Lebanese businessman and former president of the Central Fund for the Displaced.

== Early life ==
Born in 1959 in Bourj al Moulouk, Marjayoun in southern Lebanon, and belongs to the Greek Orthodox Church.

University-educated at the American University of Beirut, where he graduated as an architect (1984). He holds a master's degree in tourism management from Perpignan University in France and a doctorate in urban planning from the Lebanese University.

== Political career ==
His name emerged in public affairs, after 15 years of civil war, thanks to the lead role he has played in restoring displaced from all Lebanese regions and rebuilding what has been destroyed by war and complete reconciliation between opposing groups, especially in mount Lebanon. He also worked to stop corruption in this process.

He maintained his independency in the Lebanese political field, and was prominent in rejecting Sectarianism and strongly criticizing the proposal for an election law known as Orthodox Meeting Law.

He has publicly defended the role of Christians in openness and communication with everyone, he believes that the Christian presence in the East remains and continue as long as Christians are keeping their leading role in opening up and communication with others.

== Family life ==
He is married to Mona Kobrossi and has three children.

== Business career ==
Chadi massaad is currently chairman of CMG Engineering Group. He is the president of Lebanese Omani Business Council and was recently elected as the president of the Arab Creatures League.

- 1984 – Member of the Order of Engineers and Architects
- 1988 – Member of the Saudi Engineering Committee
- 1993 – Member of the American Concrete Institute (ACI)
- 1993 – Member of the Guggenheim Museum in New York
- 2001 – Member of the board of trustees, Beirut Marathon
- 2002 – Honorary president for Jouzour Heritage Association
- 2002 – Member of the board of trustees of Lebanon youth movement
- 2003 – Vice president of the Antonine Club Baabda
- 2004 – Vice president of the Lebanese-Chinese Friendship Association
- 2008 – Member of the Arabic Women Supporting Committee
- 2008 – Chairman of the board of trustees of 'Kahef al Founoun' Association
- 2013 – Member of the board of trustees of the Press Club
- 2017 – Member of The Lebanese Spanish League
- 2018 – Was a candidate for the parliamentary elections, May 2018

He has received several medals and awards and has many publications.
