= Nicolas Chammas =

Nicolas E. Chammas is a Lebanese Greek Orthodox economist, financier and businessman.

== Early life ==
He was born in Beirut in 1963.

He graduated from American University of Beirut (AUB), Massachusetts Institute of Technology (MIT) and Harvard Business School.

He earned a bachelor's degree in Civil Engineering, a master's degree in Civil & Environmental Engineering, and a master's degree in Business Administration with a focus on International Economy.

== Career ==
He serves as General Secretary of the Lebanese Economic Organizations and President of the Beirut Traders Association. He sits on the Board of Trustees of MIT and is the past president of the MIT Alumni Association. He is Vice-Chairman of the Board of Directors at Cedrus Bank SAL and Managing Partner of the Elie D. Chammas & Co.

Social and economic advisory missions to various ministries, public institutions and international organizations, focusing on employment, trade, development, investment, finance and competitiveness.

Frequent appearances on Lebanese and Arab TV stations. Regular contributions to the national press.

== Publications ==
Chammas' research and publications include:

- “The knowledge-based economy and its impact on the Lebanese society and economy”.
- “The socio-economic future of Lebanon in questions”.
- “Construction industry and its role in the Lebanese economy”.
- “The political and economic context in Lebanon”.
