= Selim Saadeh =

Lebanese politician

Selim Saadeh is a Lebanese politician, belonging to the Syrian Social Nationalist Party. He was born in 1949. He worked as administrative director of the TMA company. In 1992 he was elected to the Lebanese parliament, from a Greek Orthodox seat in Koura District.
