= Hani Kobeissy =

Lebanese politician

Hani Kobeissy (Arabic: هاني قبيسي) is a Shia Lebanese member of parliament who was elected in 2009 to represent the Shiite seat in the Beirut II district. He is part of the Amal Movement.

== See also ==
- Parliament of Lebanon
- List of members of the 2009–2017 Lebanese Parliament
- Amal Movement
