= Ghassan Achkar =

Lebanese politician (1937–2022)

Member of the Lebanese Parliament
- In office 1992–2005

Personal details
- Born: 8 October 1937 Dik El Mehdi, Lebanon
- Died: 8 July 2022 (aged 84)
- Party: Syrian Social Nationalist Party
- Relations: Nidal Al Achkar (sister)
- Education: Diploma in economy from Oxford (UK)

Ghassan Achkar (Arabic: غسان الأشقر; 8 October 1937 – 8 June 2022) was a Lebanese politician and member of the Syrian Social Nationalist Party in Lebanon.
