= Riad Rahal =

Lebanese Greek Orthodox politician and surgeon

Riad Rahal (Arabic: رياض رحال) is a Lebanese Greek Orthodox politician and surgeon. Rahal was born in Akkar January 5, 1950. He studied surgery and medicine at University of Tours, France. He was elected to parliament in the 2009 Lebanese general election and was a member of the Future Movement parliamentary bloc.
