= March 8 Alliance =

Lebanese pro-Assad regime political coalition

March 8 Alliance تحالف 8 آذار
- Founded: 8 March 2005; 21 years ago
- Ideology: Pro-Syria government (until 2024); Anti-Zionism; Factions: Arab socialism; Syrian nationalism; Arab nationalism; Shia Islamism; Neo-Ba'athism; Marxism-Leninism; Christian democracy; Social democracy; Pro-Iranian government; Sunni Anti-Salafism
- Political position: Big tent
- Colors: Orange, white
- Parliament of Lebanon: 51 / 128
- Cabinet of Lebanon: 5 / 24

The March 8 Alliance (Arabic: تحالف 8 آذار, romanized: taḥāluf 8 āḏār) is a loose coalition of political parties and independents in Lebanon formed in 2005 that are united by their pro-Ba'athist Syria stance and their opposition to the former March 14 Alliance. It was the ruling coalition in Lebanon with the government headed by Prime Minister Najib Mikati from June 2011 until March 2013. The Amal and Hezbollah parties, both members of the March 8 Alliance, have been part of the Nawaf Salam cabinet since February 2025.

On 22 October 2024, the leader of the Free Patriotic Movement, Gebran Bassil, announced the termination of his alliance with Hezbollah, having disagreed with it, specifically regarding the Gaza support war, out of a total of differences.

== History ==
The name dates back to 8 March 2005 when different parties called for a mass demonstration in downtown Beirut in response to the Cedar Revolution. The demonstration thanked Syria for helping stop the Lebanese Civil War and the aid in stabilising Lebanon and supporting the Lebanese resistance to the Israeli occupation. The Free Patriotic Movement led by Michel Aoun eventually joined the rival March 8 Alliance, becoming one of its principal coalition partners.

=== Inclusion of Free Patriotic Movement ===
The Free Patriotic Movement (FPM) was the basis of the March 14 Alliance movement. FPM launched the Liberation War against the Syrian Army on 14 March 1989 and participated in all demonstrations against the Syrian occupation until the Cedar Revolution's mass demonstration on 14 March 2005. The FPM split from the March 14 Alliance on 6 February 2006, when its leader Michel Aoun signed a memorandum of understanding with Hezbollah. The FPM considered its project against the Syrian government completed when the Syrian Army left Lebanon at the end of April 2005.

=== Ruling Alliance (2011–2013) ===
The Progressive Socialist Party left the March 14 alliance in January 2011 after being one of its cornerstones and ostensibly aligned itself with the alliance's Change and Reform bloc after Walid Jumblatt visited Damascus. This move gave the alliance and its partners a majority in the parliament, enabling them to name Najib Mikati as prime minister to form the Lebanese government of June 2011.

The government led by March 8 Alliance survived 22 months until Mikati's resignation on 23 March 2013.

=== 2016 presidential elections ===
After a presidential vacuum that lasted from 23 April 2014 until 31 October 2016, the Parliament was able to elect MP and former General Michel Aoun, who in turn nominated 14 March member Saad Hariri as Prime Minister.

=== 2018 legislative elections ===
The alliance emerged victorious as they gathered 76 seats out of 128 (60%), in the first legislative elections since 2009.

Name	Party/Bloc	District	Religion
Alain Aoun	Free Patriotic Movement	Baabda	Maronite
Hikmat Dib	Free Patriotic Movement	Baabda	Maronite
Roger Azar	Free Patriotic Movement	Keserwan	Maronite
Simon Abi Ramia	Free Patriotic Movement	Byblos	Maronite
Ibrahim Kanaan	Free Patriotic Movement	Metn	Maronite
Edgard Maalouf	Free Patriotic Movement	Metn	Greek Catholic
Elias Bou Saab	Free Patriotic Movement	Metn	Greek Orthodox
Hagop Pakradounian	Tashnaq	Metn	Armenian Orthodox
Talal Arslan	Lebanese Democratic Party	Aley	Druze
Cesar Abi Khalil	Free Patriotic Movement	Aley	Maronite
Ziad Assouad	Free Patriotic Movement	Jezzine	Maronite
Salim Khoury	Free Patriotic Movement	Jezzine	Greek Catholic
Assaad Dargham	Free Patriotic Movement	Akkar	Greek Orthodox
Mustapha Ali Hussein	Independent	Akkar	Alawite
Georges Atallah	Free Patriotic Movement	Koura	Greek Orthodox
Gebran Bassil	Free Patriotic Movement	Batroun	Maronite
Mario Aoun	Free Patriotic Movement	Chouf	Maronite
Farid Boustany	Free Patriotic Movement	Chouf	Maronite
Nicolas Sehnaoui	Free Patriotic Movement	Beirut I	Greek Catholic
Antoine Pano	Free Patriotic Movement	Beirut I	Christian Minorities
Alexander Matossian	Tashnaq	Beirut I	Armenian Orthodox
Hagop Terzian	Tashnaq	Beirut I	Armenian Orthodox
Edgard Traboulsi	Free Patriotic Movement	Beirut II	Protestant
Salim Aoun	Free Patriotic Movement	Zahle	Maronite
Michel Daher	Independent	Zahle	Greek Catholic
Elie Ferzli	Independent	West Bekaa	Greek Orthodox
Ali Ammar	Hezbollah	Baabda	Shia
Amin Sharri	Hezbollah	Beirut II	Shia
Nawwaf Musawi	Hezbollah	Tyre/Zahrani	Shia
Hussein Jashi	Hezbollah	Tyre/Zahrani	Shia
Hassan Fadlallah	Hezbollah	Bint Jbeil	Shia
Mohammad Raad	Hezbollah	Nabatieh	Shia
Ali Fayyad	Hezbollah	Hasbaya/Marjeyoun	Shia
Anwar Jomma	Hezbollah	Zahle	Shia
Hussein el Hage Hassan	Hezbollah	Baalbeck/Hermil	Shia
Ibrahim Mousawi	Hezbollah	Baalbeck/Hermil	Shia
Ali Mekdad	Hezbollah	Baalbeck/Hermil	Shia
Elwalid Succariyeh	Hezbollah	Baalbeck/Hermil	Sunni
Ihab Hamadeh	Hezbollah	Baalbeck/Hermil	Shia
Mohamed Khawaja	Amal Movement	Beirut II	Shia
Fadi Alameh	Amal Movement	Baabda	Shia
Nabih Berri	Amal Movement	Zahrani	Shia
Ali Osseiran	Amal Movement	Zahrani	Shia
Michel Moussa	Amal Movement	Zahrani	Greek Catholic
Ali Khreis	Amal Movement	Tyr	Shia
Inaya Ezzeddine	Amal Movement	Tyr	Shia
Yassine Jaber	Amal Movement	Nabatieh	Shia
Kassem Hachem	Arab Socialist Ba'ath Party	Marjeyoun Hasbaya	Sunni
Hani Kobeissi	Amal Movement	Nabatieh	Shia
Ali Bazzi	Amal Movement	Bint Jbeil	Shia
Ayoub Hmayed	Amal Movement	Bint Jbeil	Shia
Ali Hassan Khalil	Amal Movement	Marjeyoun Hasbaya	Shia
Anwar Khalil	Amal Movement	Marjeyoun Hasbaya	Druze
Mohamed Nasrallah	Amal Movement	West Bekaa Rashaya	Shia
Ghazi Zaiter	Amal Movement	Baalbeck Hermel	Shia
Salim Saadeh	Syrian Social Nationalist Party in Lebanon	Koura	Greek Orthodox
Assaad Hardan	Syrian Social Nationalist Party in Lebanon	Marjeyoun Hasbaya	Greek Orthodox
Albert Mansour	Syrian Social Nationalist Party in Lebanon	Baalbeck Hermel	Greek Catholic
Tony Frangieh	Marada Movement	Zgharta	Maronite
Estephan Douaihy	Marada Movement	Zgharta	Maronite
Fayez Ghosn	Marada Movement	Koura	Greek Orthodox
Ossama Saad	Popular Nasserist Organization	Saida	Sunni
Adnan Traboulsi	Al-Ahbash	Beirut II	Sunni
Abdul Rahim Mrad	Union Party	West Bekaa Rashaya	Sunni
Faisal Karami	Arab Liberation Party	Tripoli	Sunni

=== 2019 cabinet ===
The Alliance had 18 out of 30 ministers (60%) in the Lebanese Cabinet; it was equally represented in both parliament and cabinet.

Name	Party	Portfolio (Ministry)	Religion
Elias Bou Saab	Free Patriotic Movement	Minister of Defense	Greek Orthodox
Gebran Bassil	Free Patriotic Movement	Minister of Exterior and Expatriates	Maronite
Saleh Gharib	Lebanese Democratic Party	State Minister for Refugees Affairs	Druze
Ghassan Atallah	Free Patriotic Movement	Minister of Displaced	Greek Catholic
Nada Boustani	Free Patriotic Movement	Minister of Energy and Water	Maronite
Avedis Guidanian	Tashnag	Minister of Tourism	Armenian Orthodox
Hassan Mrad	Union Party	State Minister for Foreign Trade	Sunni
Albert Serhan	Free Patriotic Movement	Minister of Justice	Greek Orthodox
Salim Jreissati	Free Patriotic Movement	State Minister for Presidential Affairs	Greek Catholic
Mansour Bteich	Free Patriotic Movement	Minister of Economy and Trade	Maronite
Fadi Jreissati	Free Patriotic Movement	Minister of Environment	Greek Catholic
Youssef Finianos	Marada Movement	Minister of Public Works and Transport	Maronite
Ali Hassan Khalil	Amal Movement	Minister of Finance	Shia
Muhammad Daoud	Amal Movement	Minister of Culture	Shia
Hassan Lakkis	Amal Movement	Minister of Agriculture	Shia
Jamil Jabak	Independent	Minister of Public Health	Shia
Muhammad Fneish	Hezbollah	Minister of Youth and Sports	Shia
Mahmoud Kmati	Hezbollah	State Minister for Parliamentary Affairs	Shia

=== September 2021 Cabinet ===
The Alliance has 16 out of 24 ministers (66%) in the current Lebanese Cabinet; it is equally represented in both parliament and cabinet.

Portfolio	name	party	Religious
Deputy Prime Minister	Saadeh Al Shami	Syrian Social Nationalist Party	Greek Orthodox
Telecommunications	Johnny Corm	Marada Movement	Maronite
Information	~~George Kurdahi~~ (resigned)	~~Marada Movement~~	~~Maronite~~
Information	Ziad Makary	Marada Movement	Maronite
Defense	Maurice Slim	Free Patriotic Movement	Greek Orthodox
Tourism	Walid Nassar	Free Patriotic Movement	Maronite
Social Affairs	Hector Hajjar	Free Patriotic Movement	Greek Catholic
Energy and Water	Walid Fayad	Free Patriotic Movement	Greek Orthodox
Justice	Henry Khoury	Free Patriotic Movement	Maronite
Foreign Affairs	Abdallah Bou Habib	Free Patriotic Movement	Maronite
Displaced	Issam Charafeddine	Lebanese Democratic Party	Druze
Labor	Moustafa Bayram	Amal Movement	Shia
Finance	Youssef Khalil	Amal Movement	Shia
Agriculture	Abbas Al Haj Hassan	Amal Movement	Shia
Public Works	Ali Hamiyeh	Hezbollah	Shia
Culture	Mohammad Mortada	Hezbollah	Shia
Industry	George Bojikan	Tashnag	Armenian Orthodox

=== 2022 legislative elections ===
The alliance gathered 61 seats out of 128 (47%) and lost their parliamentary majority but still won the Parliament speaker election.

The 2022 Strong Lebanon bloc was formed by FPM (17), Tashnaq (3) and Akkar MP Mohamad Yehya.

== Constituent parties ==
It currently holds roughly 51 of 128 seats in the parliament after the 2022 elections and consists of:

Party	Arabic name	Ideology	Parliament of Lebanon	Government
Hezbollah	حزب الله	Shia Islamism; Anti-Zionism	15 / 128	government
Amal Movement	حركة أمل	Conservatism; Populism	14 / 128	government
Armenian Revolutionary Federation	الإتحاد الثوري الأرمني - الطاشناق	Armenian nationalism Democratic socialism	2 / 128	government
Islamic Charitable Projects Association	جمعية المشاريع الخيرية الإسلامية	Religious pluralism Islamic neo-traditionalism Anti-Salafism	2 / 128	support
Marada Movement	تيار المردة	Lebanese nationalism Christian democracy	1 / 128	government
Union Party	حزب الإتحاد	Nasserism	1 / 128	support
National Banner Party	حزب البعث العربي الاشتراكي في لبنان	Arab nationalism	1 / 128	support
Dignity Movement	حزب التحرر العربي	Arab nationalism Anti-Zionism	1 / 128	support
Syrian Social Nationalist Party	الحزب السوري القومي الاجتماعي	Syrian nationalism Social nationalism	0 / 128	government
Lebanese Democratic Party	الحزب الديمقراطي اللبناني	Conservatism; Druze politics	0 / 128	government
Arab Democratic Party	االحزب العربي الديمقراطي	Arab nationalism Neo-Ba'athism	0 / 128	not in government
Arab Unification Party	حزب التوحيد العربي	Arab Nationalism	0 / 128	not in government
Solidarity Party	حزب التضامن	Liberalism	0 / 128	not in government
Lebanese Arab Struggle Movement	حركة النضال العربي اللبناني	Arab Nationalism	0 / 128	not in government
Toilers League	رابطة الشغيلة	Marxism–Leninism Pan-Arabism	0 / 128	not in government

Former or inactive members

- Popular Nasserist Organization
- Toilers League
- People's Movement
- Al-Mourabitoun
- Nasserist Unionists Movement
- Free Patriotic Movement
