= 2018 Lebanese general election in South III =

2018 Lebanese general election (South III)
- 6 May 2018

11 seats to the Parliament of Lebanon for South III constituency
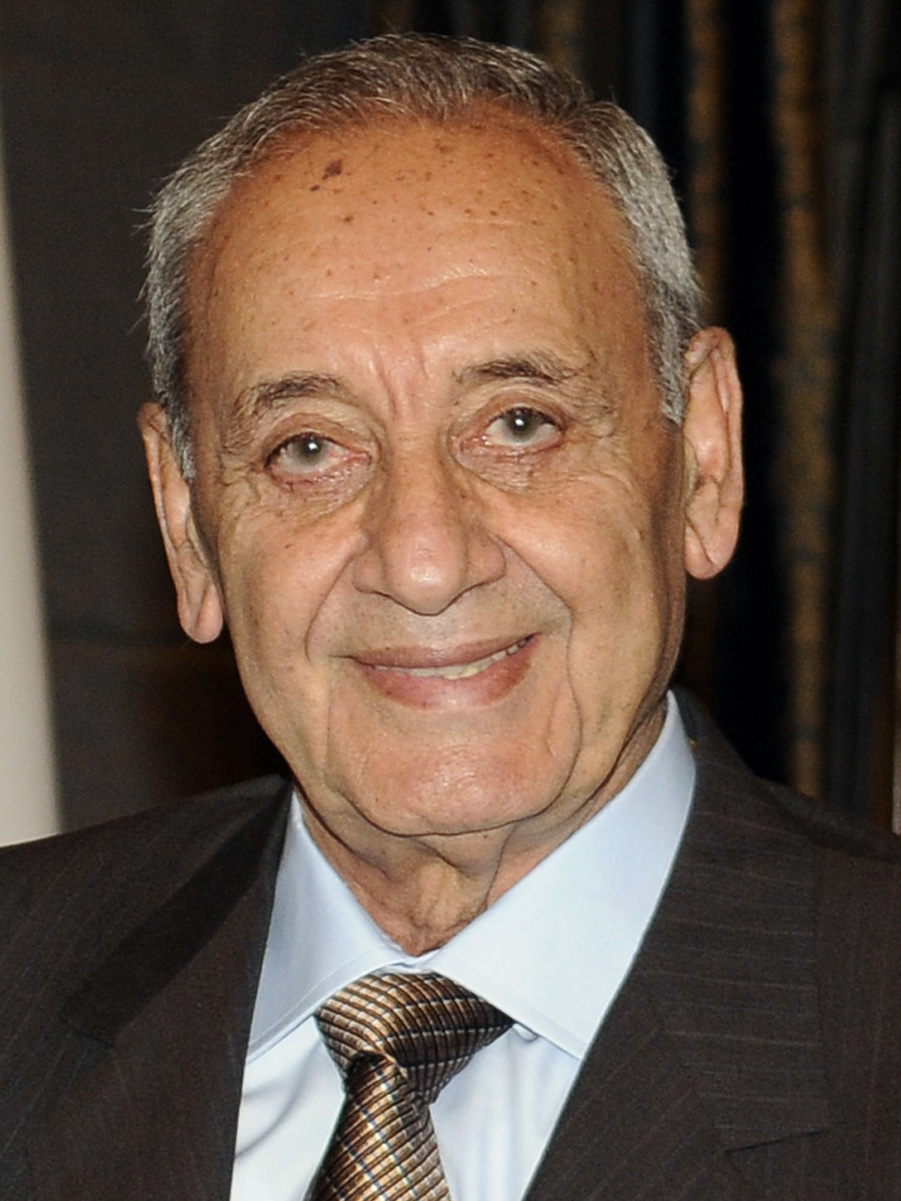

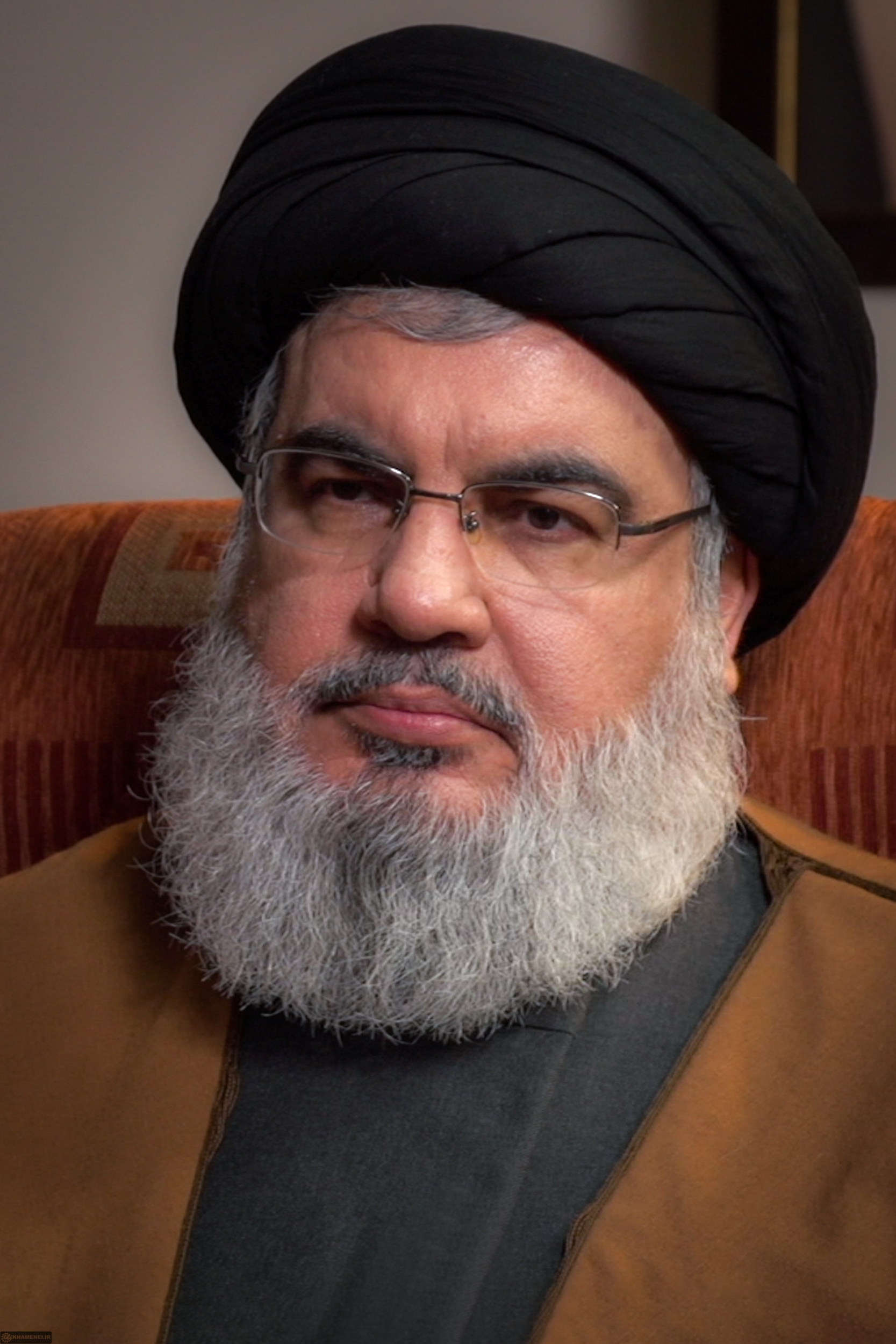

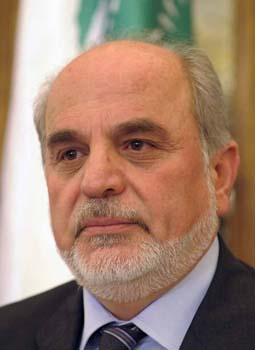
	First party	Second party	Third party
Leader	Nabih Berri	Hassan Nasrallah	Assaad Hardan
Party	Amal Movement	Hezbollah	SSNP
Leader's seat	Zahrani	Did not stand
Seats won	7	3	1
Popular vote	74,713	110,979	3,321
Percentage	32.46%	49.15%	1.47%
Elected Prime Minister
Saad Hariri
Future Movement

Voting to elect eleven members of the Lebanese parliament took place in the South III district (one of three electoral districts in South Lebanon) on 6 May 2018, part of the general election of that year. The constituency had 460,565 voters, out of whom 228,563 voted. The district elects 8 Shiite parliamentarians, 1 Druze, 1 Greek Orthodox and 1 Sunni.

== Demographics ==
In third southern electoral district 6 lists were registered. The electorate is predominantly Shia (80.1%). 6.35% of the electorate is Sunni, 5.27% Maronite, 3.65% Druze, 2.45% Greek Orthodox, 1.8% Greek Catholic and 0.39% from other Christian communities.

== Voting ==
The Amal-Hezbollah coalition fielded the "Hope and Loyalty" list. It includes a Baathist Sunni candidate, Kassem Hachem, who is fielded as Amal candidate and officially not sponsored by the Baath Party.

The Future Movement, the Free Patriotic Movement and the Lebanese Democratic Party fielded a joint list called "The South is Worth It", a list that L'Orient Le Jour labelled "supplementary" to the Amal-Hezbollah list. It includes a pro-Future independent Sunni candidate, Imad Khatib, who has business links to Amal leader Berri. Three Shia candidates (Badruddin, Sharafuddin and Osseiran) were previously close to Hezbollah. Two pro-FPM independent candidates were included in the list, Chadi Massaad (Greek Orthodox) and Mourhaf Ramadan (Shia). Druze candidate Dr. Wissam Charouf is a member of the Political Council of the Lebanese Democratic Party.

"A Vote for Change" list was fielded by the Lebanese Communist Party, the Communist Action Organization in Lebanon and independents. It includes a pro-SSNP independent candidate, Hussein Baydoun. The "National" coalition fielded a list with five candidates.

The two remaining of the lists in the fray took a more confrontative approach towards the Hezbollah-Amal dominance of the local political scene. The "Shibna Hakki" list was fielded by the Lebanese Forces and Shia dissidents, with the Shia journalist Ali Al-Amin on the list. Al-Amin had been publicly labelled as one of the "Shia of the [U.S.] Embassy" by Hezbollah general secretary Nasrallah. Al-Amin and fellow candidate and journalist Imad Komeyha, had been signatories to the 2017 call for fresh elections to the High Shia Council. Ahmed Assaad, leader of the Lebanese Option Party, fielded an anti-Hezbollah list of his own with candidates from his party. The list included Al-Assaad's wife Abeer Ramadan.

=== Candidates ===
List	Shia (Bint Jbeil, 3 seats)			Shia (Nabatieh, 3 seats)			Shia (Marjaayoun-Hasbaya, 2 seats)		Sunni (Marjaayoun-Hasbaya, 1 seat)	Druze (Marjaayoun-Hasbaya, 1 seat)	Greek Orthodox (Marjaayoun-Hasbaya, 1 seat)
"Hope and Loyalty"	Ali Ahmad Bazzi (Amal)	Ayoub Hmayed (Amal)	Hassan Fadlallah (Hezbollah)	Yassine Jaber (Amal)	Mohammad Raad (Hezbollah)	Hani Kobeissy (Amal)	Ali Hassan Khalil (Amal)	Ali Fayyad (Hezbollah)	Kassem Hachem (Amal)	Anwar Khalil (Amal)	Assaad Hardan (SSNP)
"The South is Worth It"	Mohammed Qadouh	Hussein Shaer		Hisham Jaber	Mustafa Badruddin	Nadim Osseiran	Abbas Sharafuddin	Mourhaf Ramadan	Imad Khatib	Wissam Charouf (LDP)	Chadi Massaad
"Shibna Hakki"	Ali Al-Amin			Ahmed Ismail	Rami Ollaik		Imad Komeyha				Fadi Salama (Lebanese Forces)
"A Vote for Change"	Ahmed Murad (LCP)	Abbas Sorour	Hussein Baydoun	Ali Al-Haj Ali (LCP)					Said Issa	Ghassan Hadifa (LCP)	Hala Abu Kasm (LCP)
"We Change"	Mohammed Faraj (Lebanese Option)	Abdallah Salman (Lebanese Option)		Ahmed Assaad (Lebanese Option)			Abeer Ramadhan (Lebanese Option)	Rabah Abi Haidar (Lebanese Option)	Adnan Khatib (Lebanese Option)	Kanaj Alimuddin (Lebanese Option)	Minah Saab (Lebanese Option)
"Kulluna Watani" (We are all National)	Rima Hamid (Sabaa)	Salah Nouruddin		Jamil Balout (Sabaa)						Akram Qais	Fadi Abu Jamra (Mouttahidoun)
Source: Al-Modon, Jaboubia, Jaboubia Ministry of Interior and Municipalities
