= List of members of the 2018–2022 Lebanese Parliament =

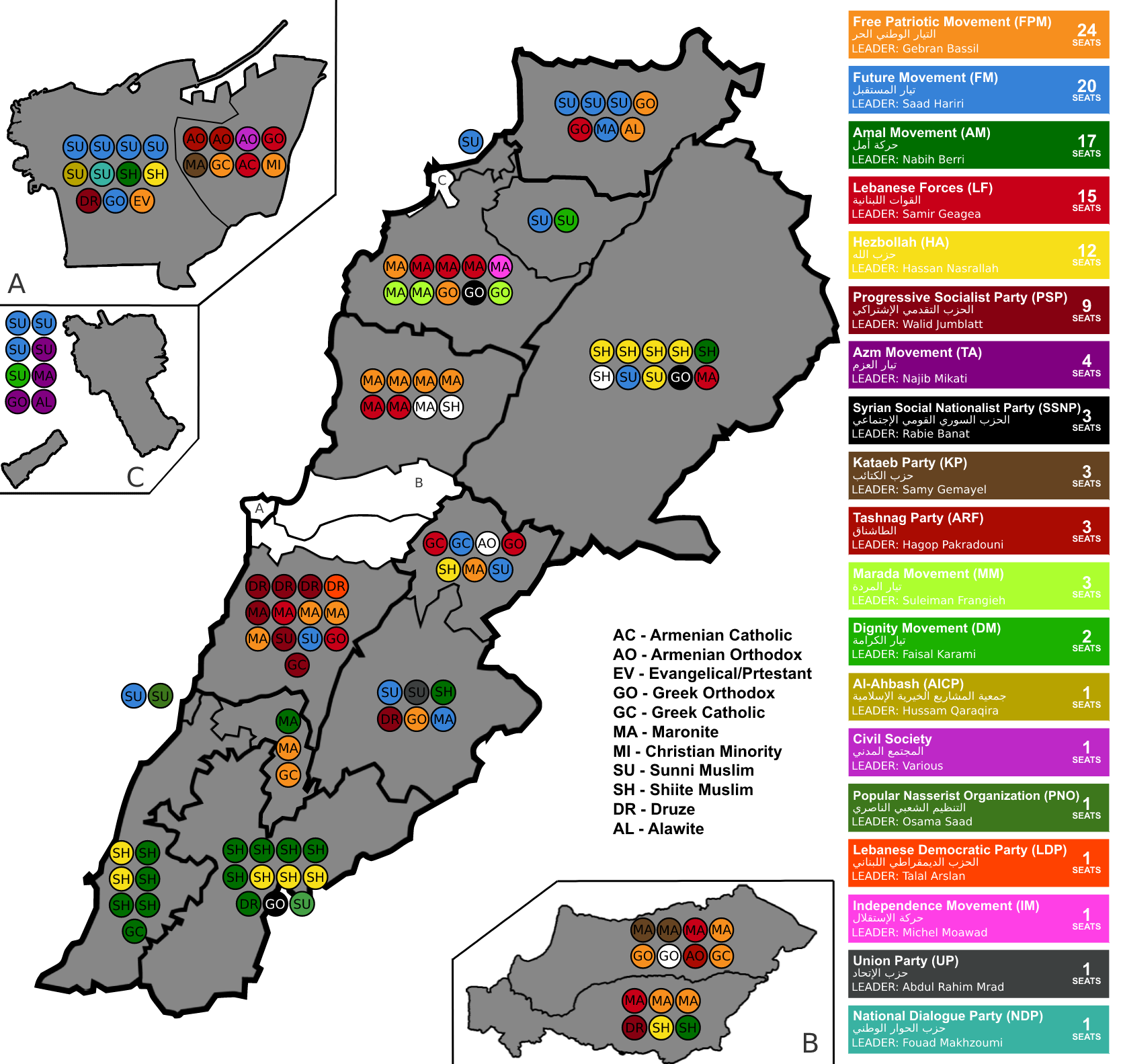
electoral map

Following the 2018 Lebanese parliamentary elections, the first held in the country since 2009, 128 candidates were elected to the Lebanese Parliament for a duration of four years. Per the Lebanese Constitution half of these MPs are Christian and half are Muslim with proportional representation among the different confessions within each religion: 34 Maronites, 27 Sunni, 27 Shia, 14 Greek Orthodox, 8 Greek Catholics, 8 Druze, 5 Armenian Orthodox, 2 Alawites, 1 Armenian Catholic, 1 Protestant and 1 member representing the 12 Christian minorities.

Name	Election Area	Parliamentary Bloc	Political Affiliation	Religion	Electoral List	Votes	Bloc Votes	Election Area Votes
Abdel Rahim Youssef Mrad	BEKAA 2	Consultative Gathering	Union Party	Sunni	Better Tomorrow	15,111	32,578	68,227/143,812
Adnan Khodor Traboulsi	BEIRUT 2	Consultative Gathering	Al-Ahbash	Sunni	Beirut's Unity	13,018	47,087	147,801/353,420
Akram Hussein Sheyab	MOUNT LEBANON 4	Democratic Gathering	Progressive Socialist Party	Druze	Reconciliation	14,088	98,967	173,320/329,870
Talal Majid Arslan	MOUNT LEBANON 6	Strong Lebanon	Lebanese Democratic Party	Druze	Mount Lebanon's Guaranteed change	9,887	59,027	173,320/329,881
Alain Aoun	MOUNT LEBANON 3	Strong Lebanon	Free Patriotic Movement	Maronite	National Accord	11,200	41,669	80,052/166,137
Albert Sami Mansour	BEKAA 3	Social Nationalist Bloc	Syrian Social Nationalist Party	Greek Catholic	Hope and Loyalty	5881	140,747	190,268/315,648
Alexander Matossian	BEIRUT 1	Strong Lebanon	Tashnag	Armenian Orthodox	Strong Beirut One	2,376	21,373	44,714/134,736
Ali Adel Ossairan	SOUTH 2	Development and Liberation	Amal Movement	Shia	Hope and Loyalty	2,203	134,068	150,264/304,197
Ali Ahmad Bazzi	SOUTH 3	Development and Liberation	Amal Movement	Shia	Hope and Loyalty	9,290	193,224	228,563/460,575
Ali Ahmad Darwish	NORTH 2	Independent Centre Bloc	Azm Movement	Alawite	Determination	2,246	42,019	151,759/350,151
Ali Fadel Ammar	MOUNT LEBANON 3	Loyalty to the Resistance	Hezbollah	Shia	National Accord	13,692	50,669	90,052/166,135
Ali Hassan Khalil	SOUTH 3	Development and Liberation	Amal Movement	Shia	Hope and Loyalty	16,765	193,224	228,563/460,573
Ali Mohamad Salman Bachir El Mokdad	BEKAA 3	Loyalty to the Resistance	Hezbollah	Shia	Hope and Loyalty	17,321	140,747	190,268/315,649
Ali Rachid Fayad	SOUTH 3	Loyalty to the Resistance	Hezbollah	Shia	Hope and Loyalty	27,460	193,224	228,563/460,569
Ali Youssef Khreiss	SOUTH 2	Development and Liberation	Amal Movement	Shia	Hope and Loyalty	15,672	134,068	150,264/304,193
Amin Mohammad Sharri	BEIRUT 2	Loyalty to the Resistance	Hezbollah	Shia	Beirut's Unity	22,961	47,087	147,801/353,419
Anis Wadih Nassar	MOUNT LEBANON 4	Strong Republic	Lebanese Forces	Greek Orthodox	Reconciliation	7,872	98,967	198,320/329,876
Antoine Costantine Bano	BEIRUT 1	Strong Lebanon	Free Patriotic Movement	Christian Minorities	Strong Beirut One	539	21,373	44,714/134,736
Antoine El Badaoui Habchi	BEKAA 3	Strong Republic	Lebanese Forces	Maronite	Dignity and Development	14,858	35,607	190,268/315,651
Anwar Hussein Joumaa	BEKAA 1	Loyalty to the Resistance	Hezbollah	Shia	Zahle Choice & Decision	15,601	23,546	94,082/175,616
Anwar Mohamad El Khalil	SOUTH 3	Development and Liberation	Amal Movement	Druze	Hope and Loyalty	6,347	193,224	228,563/460,570
Assaad Halim Hardan	SOUTH 3	Social Nationalist Bloc	Syrian Social Nationalist Party	Greek Orthodox	Hope and Loyalty	3,321	193,224	228,563/460,574
Assad Ramez Dargham	NORTH 1	Strong Lebanon	Free Patriotic Movement	Greek Orthodox	Strong Akkar	16,435	34,430	146,947/283,795
Assem Fayez Araji	BEKAA 1	Lebanon First	Future Movement	Sunni	Zahle for Everyone	7,224	36,391	94,082/175,614
Ayoub Fahed Hmayid	SOUTH 3	Development and Liberation	Amal Movement	Shia	Hope and Loyalty	7,875	193,224	228,563/460,568
Bahia Bahaa El din El Hariri	SOUTH 1	Lebanon First	Future Movement	Sunni	Integrity and Dignity	13,739	16,470	67,346/122,528
Baker Mahmoud El Houjairi	BEKAA 3	Lebanon First	Future Movement	Sunni	Dignity and Development	5,994	35,607	190,268/315,652
Bilal Ahmad Abdallah	MOUNT LEBANON 4	Democratic Gathering	Progressive Socialist Party	Sunni	Reconciliation	8,492	98,967	173,320/329,873
Cesar Naim Risk El Maalouf	BEKAA 1	Strong Republic	Independent	Greek Orthodox	Zahle Our Cause	3,554	18,702	94,082/175,619
Cezar Raymond Abi Khalil	MOUNT LEBANON 4	Strong Lebanon	Free Patriotic Movement	Maronite	Mount Lebanon's Guaranteed change	9,124	59,027	193,320/329,879
Dima Mohamad Rachid El Jamali	NORTH 2	Lebanon First	Future Movement	Sunni	The Future is for the North	2,066	51,937	151,759/350,148
Eddy Bokhos Demerjian	BEKAA 1		Independent	Armenian Orthodox	Zahle Choice & Decision	77	23,546	94,082/175,617
Edgard Boulos Maalouf	MOUNT LEBANON 2	Strong Lebanon	Free Patriotic Movement	Greek Catholic	Strong Metn	8,961	59,897	99,446/169,922
Edgard Joseph Traboulsi	BEIRUT 2	Strong Lebanon	Free Patriotic Movement	Protestant	Beirut's Unity	10,919	47,087	147,801/353,422
Elias Nicolas Bou Saab	MOUNT LEBANON 2	Strong Lebanon	Free Patriotic Movement	Greek Orthodox	Strong Metn	9,999	59,897	99,446/179,919
~~Elias Rakif Hankash~~ Resigned on 8 August 2020	~~MOUNT LEBANON 2~~	~~Kataeb~~	~~Kataeb~~	~~Maronite~~	~~Metn Pulse~~	~~2,583~~	~~19,003~~	~~92,446/179,924~~
Elie Nagib Ferzli	BEKAA 2	~~Strong Lebanon~~ Expelled from Strong Lebanon bloc on 21 April 2021	Independent	Greek Orthodox	Better Tomorrow	6,899	32,578	68,227/143,814
Estephan Boutros El Doueihy	NORTH 3	National Coalition	Marada	Maronite	Together for North and Lebanon	5,435	40,788	117,811/249,416
Fadi Fakhri Alameh	MOUNT LEBANON 3	Development and Liberation	Amal Movement	Shia	National Accord	6,348	40,669	80,052/166,138
Fadi Youssef Saad	NORTH 3	Strong Republic	Lebanese Forces	Maronite	Strong Republic Pulse	9,842	37,376	117,811/249,416
Faisal Afif Al Sayegh	BEIRUT 2	Democratic Gathering	Progressive Socialist Party	Druze	Future for Beirut	1,902	62,970	147,801/353,417
Farid Georges Philip Al Boustani	MOUNT LEBANON 5	Strong Lebanon	Free Patriotic Movement	Maronite	Mount Lebanon's Guaranteed change	9,657	51,027	173,320/329,880
Farid Haykal Al Khazen	MOUNT LEBANON 1	National Coalition	Independent	Maronite	Decision is Ours	9,081	18,553	117,603/176,716
~~Fayez Michel Ghosn~~ Died on November 22, 2021	NORTH 3	National Coalition	Marada	Greek Orthodox	Together for North and Lebanon	4,224	40,788	117,811/249,416
Faysal Omar Karami	NORTH 2	Consultative Gathering	Arab Liberation Party	Sunni	National Dignity	7,126	29,101	151,759/350,154
Fouad Moustapha Makhzoumi	BEIRUT 2		National Dialogue Party	Sunni	Lebanon is Worthy	11,346	15,773	147,801/353,423
Gebran Gergi Bassil	NORTH 3	Strong Lebanon	Free Patriotic Movement	Maronite	Strong North	16,269	38,342	148,811/249,416
Georges Elie Okais	BEKAA 1	Strong Republic	Lebanese Forces	Greek Catholic	Zahle Our Cause	11,363	18,702	94,082/175,618
Georges Jamil Adwan	MOUNT LEBANON 4	Strong Republic	Lebanese Forces	Maronite	Reconciliation	9,956	98,967	173,320/329,871
Georges Naim Atallah	NORTH 3	Strong Lebanon	Free Patriotic Movement	Greek Orthodox	Strong North	7,383	38,342	148,811/249,416
Ghazy Mohamad Zeatir	BEKAA 3	Development and Liberation	Amal Movement	Shia	Hope and Loyalty	17,767	140,747	190,268/315,647
Hadi Fawzi Hobeich	NORTH 1	Lebanon First	Future Movement	Maronite	Future for Akkar	13,055	76,452	136,947/283,794
Hadi Mohammad Rafik Aboul Hosn	MOUNT LEBANON 3	Democratic Gathering	Progressive Socialist Party	Druze	Baabda Unity & Development	11,844	26,500	80,052/166,140
Hagop Mardrios Hambarsom Terezian	BEIRUT 1	Strong Lebanon	Tashnag	Armenian Orthodox	Strong Beirut One	3,451	21,373	44,714/134,736
Hagop Ohanes Hagop Bakradonian	MOUNT LEBANON 2	Strong Lebanon	Tashnag	Armenian Orthodox	Strong Metn	7,182	38,897	92,446/179,920
Hani Hassan Kobaisi	SOUTH 3	Development and Liberation	Amal Movement	Shia	Hope and Loyalty	20,504	193,224	228,563/460,571
Hassan Nizamddine Fadlallah	SOUTH 3	Loyalty to the Resistance	Hezbollah	Shia	Hope and Loyalty	39,722	193,224	228,563/460,567
~~Henri Pierre El Helou~~ Resigned on 8 August 2020	MOUNT LEBANON 4	Democratic Gathering	Progressive Socialist Party	Maronite	Reconciliation	7,894	98,967	173,320/329,875
Henry Youssef Chedid	BEKAA 2	Lebanon First	Independent	Maronite	Future for W. Bekaa and Rashaya	1,584	31,817	68,227/143,816
Hikmat Faraj Dib	MOUNT LEBANON 3	Strong Lebanon	Free Patriotic Movement	Maronite	National Accord	7,928	41,669	91,052/166,136
Hussein Ali El Hajj Hassan	BEKAA 3	Loyalty to the Resistance	Hezbollah	Shia	Hope and Loyalty	15,662	140,747	190,268/315,644
Hussein Said Jechi	SOUTH 2	Loyalty to the Resistance	Hezbollah	Shia	Hope and Loyalty	23,864	134,068	150,264/304,196
Ibrahim Ali El Mousawi	BEKAA 3	Loyalty to the Resistance	Hezbollah	Shia	Hope and Loyalty	16,942	140,747	190,268/315,650
Ibrahim Samir Azar	SOUTH 1	Development and Liberation	Independent	Maronite	For Everyone	11,663	22,083	67,346/122,524
Ibrahim Youssef Kenaan	MOUNT LEBANON 2	Strong Lebanon	Free Patriotic Movement	Maronite	Strong Metn	11,179	59,897	92,446/179,921
Ihab Arwa Hmade	BEKAA 3	Loyalty to the Resistance	Hezbollah	Shia	Hope and Loyalty	18,404	140,747	190,268/315,645
Imad Naim Wakim	BEIRUT 1	Strong Republic	Lebanese Forces	Greek Orthodox	Beirut One	3,936	16,772	44,714/134,743
Inaya Mohamad Eizzidine	SOUTH 2	Development and Liberation	Amal Movement	Shia	Hope and Loyalty	18,815	134,068	150,264/304,198
Jamil Mohamad Amin Amin El Sayed	BEKAA 3		Independent	Shia	Hope and Loyalty	33,223	140,747	190,268/315,643
Jean Arshak Talozian	BEIRUT 1	Strong Republic	Lebanese Forces	Armenian Catholic	Beirut One	4,166	16,772	44,714/134,736
~~Jean Badawi Obeid~~ Died on 8 February 2021	NORTH 2	Independent Centre Bloc	Independent	Maronite	Determination	1,136	42,019	151,759/350,152
Jihad Mourched El Samad	NORTH 2	~~Consultative Gathering~~ (Withdrew from Consultative Gathering)	Independent	Sunni	National Dignity	11,897	29,101	151,759/350,153
Joseph Gerges Ishak	NORTH 3	Strong Republic	Lebanese Forces	Maronite	Strong Republic Pulse	5,990	37,376	117,811/249,416
Kassem Omar Hachem	SOUTH 3	Development and Liberation	Arab Socialist Ba'ath Party – Lebanon Region	Sunni	Hope and Loyalty	6,012	193,224	228,563/460,572
Majed Eddy Faek Abi Lamaa	MOUNT LEBANON 2	Strong Republic	Lebanese Forces	Maronite	Metn Heart of Lebanon	8,922	13,138	92,446/179,926
Mario Aziz Aoun	MOUNT LEBANON 7	Strong Lebanon	Free Patriotic Movement	Maronite	Mount Lebanon's Guaranteed change	10,124	49,027	189,320/329,882
~~Marwan Mohammad Hmadeh~~ Resigned on 5 August 2020	~~MOUNT LEBANON 4~~	~~Democratic Gathering~~	~~Progressive Socialist Party~~	~~Druze~~	~~Reconciliation~~	~~7,266~~	~~98,967~~	~~173,320/329,877~~
~~Michel Elias El Murr~~ Died on 31 January 2021	MOUNT LEBANON 2		Independent	Greek Orthodox	Metn Loyalty	11,945	13,779	99,446/179,925
Michel Georges Daher	BEKAA 1	~~Strong Lebanon~~ (Withdrew from Strong Lebanon Bloc)	Independent	Greek Catholic	Zahle for Everyone	9,742	36,391	94,082/175,613
Michel Hanna Moussa	SOUTH 2	Development and Liberation	Amal Movement	Greek Catholic	Hope and Loyalty	4,162	134,068	150,264/304,195
~~Michel Rene Mouawad~~ Resigned on 9 August 2020	~~NORTH 3~~	~~Strong Lebanon~~ (~~Withdrew from Strong Lebanon Bloc~~)	Independence Movement	Maronite	Strong North	8,571	33,342	117,811/249,416
Mohamad Dib Nasrallah	BEKAA 2	Development and Liberation	Amal Movement	Shia	Better Tomorrow	8,897	32,578	68,227/143,813
Mohamad Hassan Raad	SOUTH 3	Loyalty to the Resistance	Hezbollah	Shia	Hope and Loyalty	43,797	193,224	228,563/460,565
Mohamad Kassem El Karaaoui	BEKAA 2	Lebanon First	Future Movement	Sunni	Future for W. Bekaa and Rashaya	8,768	31,817	68,227/143,817
Mohamad Nagib Azmi Mikati	NORTH 2	Independent Centre Bloc	Azm Movement	Sunni	Determination	21,300	42,019	151,759/350,149
Mohamad Tarek Talal El Merehbi	NORTH 1	Lebanon First	Future Movement	Sunni	Future for Akkar	14,145	76,452	136,947/283,793
Mohamd Abdel Latif Kabbara	NORTH 2	Lebanon First	Future Movement	Sunni	The Future is for the North	9,600	51,937	151,759/350,145
Mohamd Moustafa Sleiman	NORTH 1	Lebanon First	Future Movement	Sunni	Future for Akkar	14,911	76,452	136,947/283,792
Mohammad Kassem Rachid Al Hajjar	MOUNT LEBANON 4	Lebanon First	Future Movement	Sunni	Reconciliation	10,003	98,967	173,320/329,874
Mohammad Moutapha Khawaja	BEIRUT 2	Development and Liberation	Amal Movement	Shia	Beirut's Unity	7,834	47,087	147,801/353,421
Moustafa Ali Hussein	NORTH 1	Strong Lebanon	Independent	Alawite	Strong Akkar	1,353	34,430	136,947/283,796
~~Moustapha Ali Al Hussein~~ Died on 28 July 2021	~~MOUNT LEBANON 1~~	~~National Coalition~~	Independent	Shia	Decision is Ours	256	18,553	117,603/176,717
Nabih Moustafa Berri	SOUTH 2	Development and Liberation	Amal Movement	Shia	Hope and Loyalty	42,137	134,068	150,264/304,192
~~Nadim Bachir Gemayel~~ Resigned on 8 August 2020	~~BEIRUT 1~~	~~Kataeb~~	~~Kataeb~~	~~Maronite~~	~~Beirut One~~	~~4,096~~	~~16,772~~	~~44,714/134,736~~
Nazih Nicolas Najem	BEIRUT 2	Lebanon First	Future Movement	Greek Orthodox	Future for Beirut	2,351	62,970	147,801/353,415
~~Nehmat Georges Frem~~ Resigned on 8 September 2020	MOUNT LEBANON 1	Strong Lebanon until 25 October 2019, then independent	Independent	Maronite	Strong Lebanon	10,717	54,544	117,603/176,710
Nehme Youssef Tohme	MOUNT LEBANON 4	Democratic Gathering	Progressive Socialist Party	Greek Catholic	Reconciliation	7,253	98,967	173,320/329,878
Nicolas Kamil Nahas	NORTH 2	Independent Centre Bloc	Azm Movement	Greek Orthodox	Determination	1,057	42,019	151,759/350,150
Nicolas Maurice Sehnaoui	BEIRUT 1	Strong Lebanon	Free Patriotic Movement	Greek Catholic	Strong Beirut One	4,788	21,373	44,714/134,736
Hassan Ezzeddine	SOUTH 2	Loyalty to the Resistance	Hezbollah	Shia	Hope and Loyalty			
~~Nouaf Mahmoud El Mousawi~~ Resigned on 18 July 2019	~~SOUTH 2~~	~~Loyalty to the Resistance~~	~~Hezbollah~~	~~Shia~~	~~Hope and Loyalty~~	~~24,379~~	~~134,068~~	~~150,264/304,194~~
Nouhad Saleh Al Mashnouk	BEIRUT 2	Lebanon First	Future Movement	Sunni	Future for Beirut	6,411	62,970	147,801/353,418
Osman Mohamad Alameddine	NORTH 2	Lebanon First	Future Movement	Sunni	The Future is for the North	10,221	51,937	151,759/350,144
Oussama Maarouf Saad El Masri	SOUTH 1		Popular Nasserite Organization	Sunni	For Everyone	9,880	22,083	67,346/122,525
~~Paula Sirakan Yacobian~~ Resigned on 8 August 2020	~~BEIRUT 1~~		~~Independent~~	~~Armenian Orthodox~~	~~Kulluna Watani~~	~~2,500~~	~~6,842~~	~~44,714/134,736~~
Pierre Rachid Bou Assi	MOUNT LEBANON 3	Strong Republic	Lebanese Forces	Maronite	Baabda Unity & Development	11,498	26,500	90,052/166,139
Roger Gergi Azar	MOUNT LEBANON 1	Strong Lebanon	Free Patriotic Movement	Maronite	Strong Lebanon	14,793	89,544	137,603/176,711
Roula Nizar El Tabesh	BEIRUT 2	Lebanon First	Future Movement	Sunni	Future for Beirut	6,637	62,970	147,801/353,416
Saad Eddine Rafik Al Hariri	BEIRUT 2	Lebanon First	Future Movement	Sunni	Future for Beirut	20,751	62,970	147,801/353,413
Salim Abdallah Saadeh	NORTH 3	Social Nationalist Bloc	Syrian Social Nationalist Party	Greek Orthodox	Together for North and Lebanon	5,263	40,788	117,811/249,416
Salim Georges Aoun	BEKAA 1	Strong Lebanon	Free Patriotic Movement	Maronite	Zahle for Everyone	8,567	36,391	98,082/175,615
Sami Ahmad Chaouki Fatfat	NORTH 2	Lebanon First	Future Movement	Sunni	The Future is for the North	7,943	51,937	151,759/350,147
~~Sami Amin Gemayel~~ Resigned on 8 August 2020	~~MOUNT LEBANON 2~~	~~Kataeb~~	~~Kataeb~~	~~Maronite~~	~~Metn Pulse~~	~~13,968~~	~~19,003~~	~~92,446/179,923~~
Samir Adnan El Jisr	NORTH 2	Lebanon First	Future Movement	Sunni	The Future is for the North	9,527	51,937	151,759/350,146
Selim Antoine Khoury	SOUTH 1	Strong Lebanon	Free Patriotic Movement	Greek Catholic	Saida & Jezzine Together	7,708	35,127	69,846/122,527
Shamel Rachid Roukoz	MOUNT LEBANON 1	Strong Lebanon until 25 October 2019, then independent	Independent	Maronite	Strong Lebanon	7,300	79,544	127,603/176,713
Shawki Gergi Al Dakash	MOUNT LEBANON 1	Strong Republic	Lebanese Forces	Maronite	Definite Change	10,032	26,980	137,603/176,715
Simon Farid Abi Ramia	MOUNT LEBANON 1	Strong Lebanon	Free Patriotic Movement	Maronite	Strong Lebanon	20,729	79,544	137,603/176,712
Sitrida Elias Tawk	NORTH 3	Strong Republic	Lebanese Forces	Maronite	Strong Republic Pulse	6,677	37,376	127,811/249,416
Tamam Saeb Beik Salam	BEIRUT 2	Lebanon First	Future Movement	Sunni	Future for Beirut	9,599	62,970	147,801/353,414
Taymour Walid Joumblatt	MOUNT LEBANON 4	Democratic Gathering	Progressive Socialist Party	Druze	Reconciliation	11,478	98,967	173,320/329,872
Tony Sleiman Franjieh	NORTH 3	National Coalition	Marada	Maronite	Together for North and Lebanon	11,407	40,788	117,811/249,416
Wael Wehbe Abou Faour	BEKAA 2	Democratic Gathering	Progressive Socialist Party	Druze	Future for W. Bekaa and Rashaya	10,677	31,817	68,227/143,815
Walid Mohamad Souccarieh	BEKAA 3	Consultative Gathering	Independent	Sunni	Hope and Loyalty	6,916	140,747	190,268/315,646
Walid Wajih El Baarin	NORTH 1	Lebanon First	Future Movement	Sunni	Future for Akkar	20,426	76,452	136,947/283,790
Wehbe Khalil Khalil Katicha	NORTH 1	Strong Republic	Lebanese Forces	Greek Orthodox	Future for Akkar	7,911	76,452	136,947/283,791
Yassin Kamel Jaber	SOUTH 3	Development and Liberation	Amal Movement	Shia	Hope and Loyalty	7,920	193,224	228,563/460,566
Ziad Halim Al Hawwat	MOUNT LEBANON 1	Strong Republic	Lebanese Forces	Maronite	Definite Change	14,424	26,980	117,603/176,714
Ziad Michel Assouad	SOUTH 1	Strong Lebanon	Free Patriotic Movement	Maronite	Saida & Jezzine Together	10,270	35,127	69,346/122,526

== See also ==
- List of members of the 2022–2026 Lebanese Parliament
- 2018 Lebanese general election
- Members of the 2005–2009 Lebanese Parliament
- List of members of the 2009–2017 Lebanese Parliament
