= List of members of the 2009–2017 Lebanese Parliament =

This is a List of members of the 2009–2017 Lebanese Parliament.

Name	Party/Bloc	District	Religion	Notes
Nayla Tueni	Independent within 14 March	Beirut I	Greek Orthodox	Daughter of Gebran Tueni, grandchild of Michel Murr and Ghassan Tueni
Nadim Gemayel	Kataeb Party	Beirut I	Maronite	Son of Bachir Gemayel, nephew of Amine Gemayel
Michel Pharaon	Future Movement	Beirut I	Greek Catholic	Son of Pierre Pharaon
Serge Torsarkissian	Hunchak	Beirut I	Armenian Catholic	None
Jean Ogassapian	Future Movement	Beirut I	Armenian Orthodox	None
Sebouh Kalpakian	Hunchak	Beirut II	Armenian Orthodox	None
Arthur Nazarian	Tashnag	Beirut II	Armenian Orthodox	None
Hani Kobeissy	Amal Movement	Beirut II	Shia	None
Nohad El Machnouk	Future Movement	Beirut II	Sunni	None
Saad Hariri	Future Movement	Beirut III	Sunni	Son of Rafik Hariri, Nephew of Bahia Hariri
Ammar Houry	Future Movement	Beirut III	Sunni	None
Mohammed Kabbani	Future Movement	Beirut III	Sunni	None
Tammam Salam	Future Movement	Beirut III	Sunni	Son of Saeb Salam
Imad el Hout	Islamic Group	Beirut III	Sunni	None
Ghazi Youssef	Future Movement	Beirut III	Shia	None
Ghazi Aridi	Progressive Socialist Party	Beirut III	Druz	None
Atef Majdalani	Constitutional Bloc	Beirut III	Greek Orthodox	None
Bassem Chabb	Future Movement	Beirut III	Protestant	None
Nabil De Freije	Future Movement	Beirut III	Minorities	None
Khaled Zahraman	Future Movement	Akkar	Sunni	None
Khaled El Daher	Independent with 14 March	Akkar	Sunni	None
Mouiine el Merehbi	Future Movement	Akkar	Sunni	None
Khodr Habib	Future Movement	Akkar	Alawite	None
Riad Rahal	Future Movement	Akkar	Greek Orthodox	None
Nidal Tohme	Future Movement	Akkar	Greek Orthodox	None
Hadi Hobeiche	Future Movement	Akkar	Maronite	Son of Fawzi Hobeiche
Hachem Alameddine	Future Movement	Minyeh	Sunni	Son of Mohammad Alameddine
Ahmad Fatfat	Future Movement	Dinniyeh	Sunni	None
Kassem Abdulaziz	Future Movement	Dinniyeh	Sunni	None
Samir el Jisr	Future Movement	Tripoli	Sunni	None
Mohammad Kabbara	Future Movement	Tripoli	Sunni	None
Mohammad Safadi	Tripoli Bloc	Tripoli	Sunni	None
Najib Mikati	Tripolitan Solidarity Bloc	Tripoli	Sunni	None
Ahmad Karami	Tripolitan Solidarity Bloc	Tripoli	Sunni	
Badr Wannous	Future Movement	Tripoli	Alawite	None
Robert Fadel	Tripoli Bloc	Tripoli	Greek Orthodox	Son of Maurice Fadel
Samer Saadeh	Kataeb	Tripoli	Maronite	Son of Georges Saadeh
Suleiman Frangieh	Marada Movement	Zgharta	Maronite	Son of Tony Frangieh, grandson of Suleiman Frangieh
Salim Karam	Marada Movement	Zgharta	Maronite	Son of Youssef Salim Karam
Estephan Douaihy	Marada Movement	Zgharta	Maronite	Nephew of Semaan Douaihy
Farid Makari	Future Movement	Koura	Greek Orthodox	Deputy Speaker
Nicolas Ghosn	Future Movement	Koura	Greek Orthodox	Son of Fouad Ghosn
Farid Habib	Lebanese Forces	Koura	Greek Orthodox	replaced by Fadi Karam upon his death in 2012
Strida Geagea	Lebanese Forces	Bsharri	Maronite	Wife of Samir Geagea, niece of Gebran Tawk
Elie Keyrouz	Lebanese Forces	Bsharri	Maronite	None
Antoine Zahra	Lebanese Forces	Batroun	Maronite	None
Boutros Harb	Independent within 14 March	Batroun	Maronite	None
Ibrahim Khoury	Constitutional Bloc	Metn	Greek Orthodox	Son of Najib Khoury, cousin of Nazem Khoury
Simon Abi Ramia	Free Patriotic Movement	Byblos	Maronite	None
Abbas Hachem	Free Patriotic Movement	Byblos	Shia	None
Michel Aoun	Free Patriotic Movement	Kesserwan	Maronite	Father-in-law of Gebran Bassil, uncle of Alain Aoun. Elected president of the Lebanese Republic on 31 October 2016
Neemtallah Abi Nasr	Free Patriotic Movement	Kesserwan	Maronite	None
Youssef Khalil	Free Patriotic Movement	Kesserwan	Maronite	None
Gilberte Zouein	Free Patriotic Movement	Kesserwan	Maronite	Daughter of Maurice Zouein, Granddaughter of Georges Zouein
Farid Elias el-Khazen	Free Patriotic Movement	Kesserwan	Maronite	None
Ibrahim Kanaan	Free Patriotic Movement	Metn	Maronite	None
Nabil Nicolas	Free Patriotic Movement	Metn	Maronite	None
Salim Salhab	Free Patriotic Movement	Metn	Maronite	None
Samy Gemayel	Kataeb	Metn	Maronite	Son of Amine Gemayel, nephew of Bachir Gemayel
Ghassan Moukheiber	Free Patriotic Movement	Byblos	Maronite	Nephew of Albert Moukheiber
Michel Murr	Independent	Metn	Greek Orthodox	Father of Elias Murr, Grandfather of Nayla Tueni
Edgard Maalouf	Free Patriotic Movement	Metn	Greek Catholic	None
Hagop Pakradounian	Tashnag	Metn	Armenian Orthodox	None
Naji Gharios	Free Patriotic Movement	Baabda	Maronite	None
Hikmat Dib	Free Patriotic Movement	Baabda	Maronite	None
Alain Aoun	Free Patriotic Movement	Baabda	Maronite	Nephew of Michel Aoun
Ali Ammar	Hezbollah	Baabda	Shia	Nephew of Mahmoud Ammar
Bilal Farhat	Hezbollah	Baabda	Shia	None
Fady el Aawar	Lebanese Democratic Party	Baabda	Druz	None
Talal Arslan	Lebanese Democratic Party	Aley	Druz	Son of Majid Arslan
Akram Chehayeb	Progressive Socialist Party	Aley	Druz	None
Henri Helou	Progressive Socialist Party	Aley	Maronite	Son of Pierre Helou
Fouad Saad	Progressive Socialist Party	Aley	Maronite	grandson of Habib Pacha Es-Saad
Fady Habr	Kataeb	Aley	Greek Orthodox	None
Walid Joumblatt	Progressive Socialist Party	Chouf	Druz	Son of Kamal Joumblatt
Marwan Hamadeh	Progressive Socialist Party	Chouf	Druz	Brother-in-law of Ghassan Tueni, Uncle of Gebran Tueni
Elie Aoun	Progressive Socialist Party	Chouf	Maronite	None
Dory Chamoun	National Liberal Party	Chouf	Maronite	Son of Camille Chamoun
Georges Adwan	Lebanese Forces	Chouf	Maronite	None
Nehme Tohme	Progressive Socialist Party	Chouf	Greek Catholic	None
Alaeddine Terro	Progressive Socialist Party	Chouf	Sunni	None
Mohamad El Hajjar	Future Movement	Chouf	Sunni	None
Bahia Hariri	Future Movement	Saida	Sunni	Sister of Rafik Hariri, aunt of Saad Hariri
Fouad Siniora	Future Movement	Saida	Sunni	None
Nabih Berri	Amal Movement	Zahrani	Shia	Speaker of the Parliament
Ali Osseiran	Amal Movement	Zahrani	Shia	Son of Adel Osseiran
Michel Moussa	Independent with Nabih Berri parliamentary group	Zahrani	Greek Catholic	None
Ali Khreis	Amal Movement	Sour	Shia	None
Abdelmajid Saleh	Amal Movement	Sour	Shia	None
Mohammad Fneish	Hezbollah	Sour	Shia	None
Nawwaf Moussawi	Hezbollah	Sour	Shia	None
Ziad Assouad	Free Patriotic Movement	Jezzine	Maronite	None
Michel Helou	Free Patriotic Movement	Jezzine	Maronite	until 22 May 2016 (died)
Amal Abou Zeid	Free Patriotic Movement	Jezzine	Maronite	Elected 22 May 2016 after the death of the deputy Michel Helou
Issam Sawaya	Free Patriotic Movement	Jezzine	Greek Catholic	None
Ali Ahmad Bazzi	Amal Movement	Bint Jbeil	Shia	None
Ayoub Hmayed	Amal Movement	Bint Jbeil	Shia	None
Hassan Fadlallah	Hezbollah	Bint Jbeil	Shia	None
Abdellatif Zein	Amal Movement	Nabatieh	Shia	Son of Youssef Zein, Brother of AbdelMajid Zein and AbdelKarim Zein
Yassine Jaber	Amal Movement	Nabatieh	Shia	None
Mohammad Raad	Hezbollah	Nabatieh	Shia	None
Ali Hassan Khalil	Amal Movement	Hasbaya/Marjeyoun	Shia	None
Ali Fayyad	Hezbollah	Hasbaya/Marjeyoun	Shia	None
Anwar Khalil	Amal Movement	Hasbaya/Marjeyoun	Druz	None
Kassem Hachem	Amal Movement	Hasbaya/Marjeyoun	Sunni	None
Assaad Hardan	Syrian Social Nationalist Party	Hasbaya/Marjeyoun	Greek Orthodox	None
Jamal Jarrah	Future Movement	West Beqaa/Rashaya	Sunni	None
Ziad el Kadiri	Future Movement	West Beqaa/Rashaya	Sunni	Son of Nazem el Kadiri
Amine Wehbeh	Democratic Left Movement	West Beqaa/Rashaya	Shia	None
Wael Abou Faour	Progressive Socialist Party	West Beqaa/Rashaya	Druz	None
Antoine Saad	Progressive Socialist Party	West Beqaa/Rashaya	Greek Orthodox	None
Robert Ghanem	Independent within March 14	West Beqaa/Rashaya	Maronite	Son of Iskandar Ghanem
Nicolas Fattouche	Zahle In our Hearts Bloc	Zahlé	Greek Catholic	None
Tony Abou Khater	Lebanese Forces and Zahle Block	Zahlé	Greek Catholic	None
Joseph Maalouf	Lebanese Forces and Zahle Block	Zahlé	Greek Orthodox	None
Shant Chinchinian (Jinjinian)	Lebanese Forces and Zahle Block	Zahlé	Armenian Orthodox	None
Elie Marouni	Kataeb and Zahle Block	Zahlé	Maronite	None
Assem Araji	Future Movement	Zahlé	Sunni	None
Okab Sakr	Lebanon first and Zahle Bloc	Zahlé	Shia	None
Hussein Moussawi	Hezbollah	Baalbeck/Hermil	Shia	None
Hussein el Hage Hassan	Hezbollah	Baalbeck/Hermil	Shia	None
Nawwar el Sahili	Hezbollah	Baalbeck/Hermil	Shia	None
Ali Mekdad	Hezbollah	Baalbeck/Hermil	Shia	None
Ghazi Zaiter	Amal Movement	Baalbeck/Hermil	Shia	None
Assem Qanso	Arab Socialist Ba'ath Party of Lebanon	Baalbeck/Hermil	Shia	None
Elwalid Succariyeh	Hezbollah	Baalbeck/Hermil	Sunni	Brother of Ismail Succariyeh
Kamel Rifaii	Islamic Action Front	Baalbeck/Hermil	Sunni	None
Marwan Fares	Syrian Social Nationalist Party	Baalbeck/Hermil	Greek Catholic	None
Emile Rahme	Solidarity Party	Baalbeck/Hermil	Maronite	Nephew of Morched Habchi

== See also ==
- 2009 Lebanese general election
- Members of the 2005–2009 Lebanese Parliament
