= List of members of the 2005–2009 Lebanese Parliament =

This list compiles the names of Parliament of Lebanon members who were elected in June 2005. The Parliament of Lebanon has 128 members who are classified according to confession.

Changes during the legislature:

- Edmond Naim, who died in office, was replaced with Pierre Daccache.
- Gebran Tueni, victim of assassination, was replaced by his father Ghassan Tueni.
- Pierre Gemayel and Walid Eido, both assassinated, were replaced in a 2007 by-election by Camille Khoury and Mohammed Amin el Itani.
- Antoine Ghanem, assassinated in September 2007, was not replaced until the June 2009 regularly scheduled parliamentary election ushered in his successor.

== Members ==
| Name | Party/Bloc | District | Religion | Notes |
|---|---|---|---|---|
| Ahmad Fatfat | Future Movement | Dinnieh | Sunni | |
| Akram Chehayeb | Progressive Socialist Party | Aley | Druze | |
| Amine Sherri | Hezbollah | Beirut | Shia | |
| Anwar Khalil | Amal Movement | Marjeyoun - Hasbaya | Druze | |
| Antoine Ghanem | Kataeb | Baabda | Maronite | |
| Antoine Saad | Progressive Socialist Party | West Bekaa - Rachaya | Greek Orthodox | |
| Ayman Choucair | Progressive Socialist Party | Baabda | Druze | |
| Ayub Hmayed | Amal Movement | Bint Jbeil | Shia | |
| Antoine Zahra | Lebanese Forces | Batroun | Maronite | |
| Antoine Khoury | Amal Movement | Jezzine | Greek Catholic | |
| Antoine Andraos | Future Movement | Aley | Greek Orthodox | |
| Ahmad Fattuh | Future Movement | West Bekaa - Rachaya | Sunni | |
| Assaad Hardan | Syrian Social Nationalist Party | Marjeyoun - Hasbaya | Greek Orthodox | |
| Atef Majdalani | Future Movement | Beirut | Greek Orthodox | |
| Assem Araji | Popular Bloc | Zahle | Sunni | |
| Abdul Majid Saleh | Amal Movement | Tyre | Shia | |
| Abdel-Latif Zein | Amal Movement | Nabatieh | Shia | |
| Abbas Hachem | Free Patriotic Movement | Jbeil | Shia | |
| Abdallah Hanna | Future Movement | Akkar | Greek Orthodox | |
| Abdallah Farhat | Progressive Socialist Party | Baabda | Maronite | |
| Azzam Dandash | | Akkar | Sunni | |
| Ala'edeen Turo | Progressive Socialist Party | Chouf | Sunni | |
| Ali Miqdad | Hezbollah | Baalbek - Hermel | Shia | |
| Ali Ahmad Bazzi | Amal Movement | Bint Jbeil | Shia | |
| Ali Hassan Khalil | Amal Movement | Marjeyoun - Hasbaya | Shia | |
| Ali Khreis | Amal Movement | Tyre | Shia | |
| Ali Osseiran | Amal Movement | Zahrani | Shia | Son of Speaker Adel Osseiran |
| Ali Ammar | Hezbollah | Baabda | Shia | |
| Ammar Houri | Future Movement | Beirut | Sunni | |
| Bassem Sabeh | Future Movement | Baabda | Shia | |
| Bassem Chab | Future Movement | Beirut | Evangelical | |
| Badr Wannous | Future Movement | Tripoli | Alawite | |
| Boutros Harb | Lebanese Forces | Batroun | Maronite | |
| Bahij Tabbara | Future Movement | Beirut | Sunni | |
| Bahia Hariri | Future Movement | Saida | Sunni | Sister of PM Rafic Hariri, Aunt of PM Saad Hariri |
| Camille Maalouf | Popular Bloc | Zahle | Greek Orthodox | |
| Camille Khoury | Free Patriotic Movement | Matn | Maronite | |
| Chamel Mouzaya | Free Patriotic Movement | Jbeil | Maronite | |
| Edmond Naim | Lebanese Forces | Baabda | Maronite | Died in office on January 23, 2006. Replaced by Pierre Daccache |
| Elias Atallah | Democratic Left Movement | Tripoli | Maronite | |
| Elias Skaff | Popular Bloc | Zahle | Greek Catholic | |
| Elie Keyrouz | Lebanese Forces | Bsharre | Maronite | |
| Edgar Maalouf | Free Patriotic Movement | Matn | Greek Catholic | |
| Elie Aoun | Progressive Socialist Party | Chouf | Maronite | |
| Farid Elias Khazen | Free Patriotic Movement | Keserwan | Maronite | |
| Fouad Al-Saad | Progressive Socialist Party | Aley | Maronite | |
| Farid Habib | Lebanese Forces | Koura | Greek Orthodox | |
| Farid Makari | Future Movement | Koura | Greek Orthodox | |
| Faisal Al-Sayegh | Progressive Socialist Party | Aley | Druze | |
| Gebran Tueni | | Beirut | Greek Orthodox | Assassinated on December 12, 2005. Replaced by his father Ghassan Tueni |
| Georges Adwan | Lebanese Forces | Chouf | Maronite | |
| George Qasarji | Popular Bloc | Zahle | Armenian Orthodox | |
| Gilberte Zwain | Free Patriotic Movement | Keserwan | Maronite | |
| Ghazi Aridi | Progressive Socialist Party | Beirut | Druze | |
| Ghazi Zaiter | Amal Movement | Baalbek - Hermel | Shia | |
| Ghazi Youssef | Future Movement | Beirut | Shia | |
| Ghassan Tueni | | Beirut | Greek Orthodox | Father of MP Gebran Tueni |
| Ghassan Moukheiber | Free Patriotic Movement | Matn | Greek Orthodox | Nephew of MP Albert Moukheiber |
| Ghinwa Jaloul | Future Movement | Beirut | Sunni | |
| Hassan Hobballah | Hezbollah | Tyre | Shia | |
| Hassan Fadlallah | Hezbollah | Bint Jbeil | Shia | |
| Hassan Yacoub | Popular Bloc | Zahle | Shia | |
| Hussein Hajj Hassan | Hezbollah | Baalbek - Hermel | Shia | |
| Hussein Husseini | | Baalbek - Hermel | Shia | Former Speaker of the Parliament |
| Hagop Pakradounian | Tashnag | Matn | Armenian Orthodox | |
| Hagop Kassargian | Ramgavar | Beirut | Armenian Orthodox | |
| Hadi Hobeich | Future Movement | Akkar | Maronite | Son of MP Fawzi Hobeich |
| Hachem Alamuddin | Future Movement | Minieh | Sunni | |
| Henri Helou | Progressive Socialist Party | Aley | Maronite | Son of MP Pierre Helou |
| Ibrahim Kanaan | Free Patriotic Movement | Matn | Maronite | |
| Ismail Sukkariyyeh | Hezbollah | Baalbek - Hermel | Sunni | |
| Jamal Jarrah | Future Movement | West Bekaa - Rachaya | Sunni | |
| Jamal Takesh | Hezbollah | Baalbek - Hermel | Shia | |
| Jawad Boulos | Independence Movement | Zgharta | Maronite | |
| Jean Ogassapian | Future Movement | Beirut | Armenian Orthodox | |
| Kamel Rifai | Islamic Action Front | Baalbek - Hermel | Sunni | |
| Mohammed Amin Itani | Future Movement | Beirut | Sunni | |
| Mahmoud Mrad | Future Movement | Akkar | Sunni | |
| Mohammed Hajjar | Future Movement | Chouf | Sunni | |
| Mohammad Safadi | Future Movement | Tripoli | Sunni | |
| Mohammed Haidar | Hezbollah | Marjeyoun - Hasbaya | Shia | |
| Mohammed Raad | Hezbollah | Nabatieh | Shia | |
| Mohammed Fnech | Hezbollah | Tyre | Shia | |
| Mohammad Qabbani | Future Movement | Beirut | Sunni | |
| Mohammed Kabbara | Future Movement | Tripoli | Sunni | |
| Marwan Hamadeh | Progressive Socialist Party | Chouf | Druze | |
| Marwan Fares | Syrian Social Nationalist Party | Baalbek - Hermel | Greek Catholic | |
| Misbah El-Ahdab | | Tripoli | Sunni | |
| Mustafa Hussein | | Akkar | Alawite | |
| Mustafa Hachem | Future Movement | Akkar | Sunni | |
| Mustafa Alloush | Future Movement | Tripoli | Sunni | |
| Maurice Fadel | Future Movement | Tripoli | Greek Orthodox | |
| Michel Murr | | Matn | Greek Orthodox | |
| Michel Aoun | Free Patriotic Movement | Keserwan | Maronite | Former PM and President (disputed) |
| Michel Pharaon | Future Movement | Beirut | Greek Catholic | |
| Michel Moussa | Amal Movement | Zahrani | Greek Catholic | |
| Nader Succar | Kataeb | Baalbek - Hermel | Maronite | |
| Nasser Nasrallah | | West Bekaa - Rachaya | Shia | |
| Nayla Mouawad | Independence Movement | Zgharta | Maronite | Widow of President Rene Mouawad |
| Nabil al-Bustani | Progressive Socialist Party | Chouf | Maronite | |
| Nabil de Freij | Future Movement | Beirut | Roman Catholic | |
| Nabil Nicolas | Free Patriotic Movement | Matn | Maronite | |
| Neemtallah Abi Nasr | Free Patriotic Movement | Keserwan | Maronite | |
| Nehme Tohme | Progressive Socialist Party | Chouf | Greek Catholic | |
| Nicolas Ghosn | Future Movement | Koura | Greek Orthodox | |
| Nicolas Fattoush | | Zahle | Greek Catholic | |
| Nawwar el Sahili | Hezbollah | Baalbek - Hermel | Shia | |
| Nabih Berri | Amal Movement | Zahrani | Shia | Speaker of the Parliament |
| Ossama Saad | Popular Nasserite Organization | Saida | Sunni | Son of MP Maarouf Saad |
| Pierre Sirhal | Hezbollah | Jezzine | Maronite | |
| Pierre Daccache | | Baabda | Maronite | Replaced deceased MP Edmond Naim |
| Pierre Amine Gemayel | Kataeb | Matn | Maronite | Son of President Amine Gemayel, nephew of President Bashir Gemayel |
| Robert Ghanem | | West Bekaa - Rachaya | Maronite | |
| Riad Rahal | Future Movement | Akkar | Greek Orthodox | |
| Strida Geagea | Lebanese Forces | Bsharre | Maronite | Wife of LF leader Samir Geagea |
| Saad Hariri | Future Movement | Beirut | Sunni | Son of PM Rafic Hariri |
| Salim Aoun | Free Patriotic Movement | Zahle | Maronite | |
| Salim Salhab | Free Patriotic Movement | Matn | Maronite | |
| Samir Jisr | Future Movement | Tripoli | Sunni | |
| Samir Azar | Amal Movement | Jezzine | Maronite | |
| Samir Frangieh | Independence Movement | Zgharta | Maronite | |
| Serge Torsarkissian | Hunchak | Beirut | Armenian Catholic | |
| Solange Gemayel | Kataeb | Beirut | Maronite | Widow of President Bashir Gemayel |
| Wael Abu Faour | Progressive Socialist Party | West Bekaa - Rachaya | Druze | |
| Walid Khoury | Free Patriotic Movement | Jbeil | Maronite | |
| Walid Jumblatt | Progressive Socialist Party | Chouf | Druze | Son of MP Kamal Jumblatt |
| Walid Eido | Future Movement | Beirut | Sunni | |
| Yassine Jaber | Amal Movement | Nabatieh | Shia | |
| Yeghig Jerejian | Hunchak | Beirut | Armenian Orthodox | |
| Yousef Khalil | Free Patriotic Movement | Keserwan | Maronite | |

== See also ==
- 2005 Lebanese general election
- List of members of the 2009–2017 Lebanese Parliament

== Sources ==
The Members of Parliament, Parliament of Lebanon, 2005, archived from the original on 4 July 2007
