= Bint Jbeil electoral district =

Bint Jbeil
- Former constituency for the Parliament of Lebanon
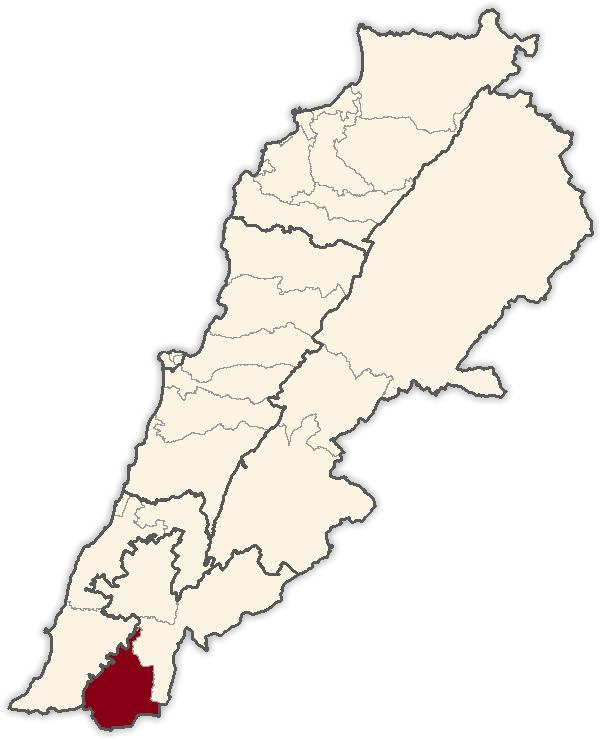
- Governorate: Nabatieh
- Electorate: 127,925 (2011)

Former constituency
- Created: 1953
- Abolished: 2017
- Number of members: 3 (Shia)
- MPs: Ayoub Hmayed, Hassan Fadlallah, Ali Ahmad Bazzi (2009-2017)

Bint Jbeil electoral district (Arabic: دائرة بنت جبيل) was an electoral district in Lebanon. It covered all areas of the Bint Jbeil District. The constituency elected three Shia Muslim members of the Parliament of Lebanon (for more information on the Lebanese electoral system, see Elections in Lebanon).

== Demographics ==
The Ministry of Interior and Municipalities reported in 2011 that the constituency had 127,925 registered voters and the following religious composition: 88.11 percent Shia Muslims, 9.31 percent Maronites and 2.41 percent Greek Catholics.

== 1953 election ==
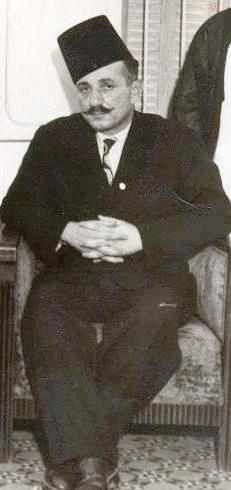
Ahmad al-As'ad, representing Bint Jbeil in parliament 1953-1957 and 1960-1961

The Bint Jbeil electoral district was created in 1953, as a single-member constituency. In the 1953 parliamentary election the seat was won by Ahmad al-As'ad, a powerful Shia landlord. His main opponent in the election had been the nationalist candidate Ali Bazzi.

== 1957 election ==
There was a reform of the seat distribution of parliamentary constituencies in 1957, but Bint Jbeil remained a single-member constituency. Instead the neighbouring electoral district of Nabatieh was awarded an additional Shia seat. Ahmad al-As'ad argued that this move had been done deliberately to curtail his political influence. The Bint Jbeil seat was won by Ali Bazzi in the 1957 parliamentary election.

== 1960 election ==
The 1960 Election Law adopted a set-up of electoral districts largely based on the Qadas. As per the 1960 Law the Bint Jbeil electoral district elected two Shia Members of Parliament and was estimated to have had 28,043 Shia Muslim registered voters, 4,463 Maronites, 1,791 Greek Catholics, 96 Sunni Muslims and 68 Minorities. In the 1960 parliamentary election Ahmed al-As'ad (now leading the Sha'ab party) and Sa'id Fawaz (42-year-old former government official) were elected from Bint Jbeil. Al-As'ad's candidature had been supported by Fouad Chehab. Ahmad al-As'ad died in March 1961. A by-election was held in April the same year in which his son Kamil al-As'ad was elected. Kamil al-As'ad became the leader of the Southern Bloc in parliament and was named Minister of Education and Fine Arts in the cabinet of Rashid Karami.

== 1964 election ==
In the 1964 parliamentary election the Bint Jbeil seats were won by Abdellatif Beydoun and Abdallah Ghneimeh.

== 1968 election ==
In the 1968 parliamentary election the candidates on the list supported by Adel Osseiran won the seats in Bint Jbeil. Sa'id Fawaz returned to parliament, accompanied by the physician Ibrahim Cheaito. Out of the 31,034 registered voters, 17,793 participated in the election.

Candidate	Party	Votes	%	Won?
Sa'id Fawaz	Democratic Parliamentary Front	8,613	48.41%	Yes
Ibrahim Cheaito	Democratic Parliamentary Front	8,077	45.39%	Yes
Abdellatif Beydoun		7,714	43.35%	
Ali Abbas Khalil		6,387	35.90%	
Husayn Muruwwah	Lebanese Communist Party	1,446	8.13%	
Ahmad Majid		1,013	5.69%	
Ghassan Shararah	Ba'athist	786	4.42%	
Abdallah al-Ghutaymi		715	4.02%	

== 1972 election ==
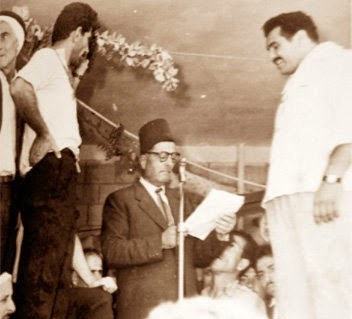
Abdellatif Beydoun

In the 1972 parliamentary election Abdellatif Beydoun and Hamid Dakroub were elected from Bint Jbeil.

Candidate	Party	Votes	Won?
Abdellatif Beydoun		10,710	Yes
Hamid Dakroub		9,912	Yes
Ali Bazzi		7,977	
Nazem Khalil		3,229	
Ahmad Murad	Lebanese Communist Party	3,160	
Ali Yusuf	Ba'athist	1,422	
Abdallah al-Ghutaymi		1,245	

== 1991 appointment ==
Abdellatif Beydoun died in 1984. In 1991 Abdallah Al Amin was appointed to replace him as parliamentarian of Bint Jbeil. Al-Amin was the regional secretary of the Arab Socialist Baath Party.

== 2008 Doha Agreement ==
A new set-up of constituencies was used ahead of the 1992 general election, abolishing the 1960 Election Law constituencies. However, the 2008 Doha Agreement instituted a set-up of electoral districts similar to those of the 1960 Election Law. Thus the Bint Jbeil electoral district was recreated ahead of the 2009 parliamentary election. The electoral district now elected three Shia Members of Parliament.

== 2009 election ==
During the 2009 election there were 123,396 registered voters in Bint Jbeil. Ahead of the election the March 8 Alliance candidates were expected to win the election easily. The March 8 Alliance fielded Ayoub Hmayed (Amal Movement), Hassan Fadlallah (Hezbollah) and Ali Ahmad Bazzi (Amal Movement) as its candidates.

Ali Mhanna and Dr. Ahmad al-Khahwaja stood as candidates of the Lebanese Option Gathering. Lebanese Option Gathering leader Ahmad al-As'ad declared before the election that his party sought to challenge the Hezbollah 'monopoly' in the Shia community. The Lebanese Communist Party opted to boycott the election in Bint Jbeil.

52,899 voters cast their votes in Bint Jbeil (42.86 percent). The National News Agency reported that voting was calm. UNIFIL forces deployed along the border on election day.

All three candidates of the March 8 list were elected with wide margins.

Candidate	Party	Votes	%	Won?
Hassan Fadlallah	Hezbollah	49,582	94.24%	Yes
Ali Ahmad Bazzi	Amal Movement	49,220	93.04%	Yes
Ayoub Hmayed	Amal Movement	48,775	92.20%	Yes
Ali Mhanna	Lebanese Option Gathering	616	1.16%	
Ahmad al-Khawaja	Lebanese Option Gathering	554	1.05%	
Mahmoud Beydoun	Socialist Arab Lebanon Vanguard	470	0.89%	
Mohammad Kdouh		299	0.56%	
Nazem Ibrahim		227	0.43%	
Mohammad Atwi		19	0.03%	

There were 783 blank votes and 420 invalid ballots.

== 2017 Vote Law ==
As per the new Vote Law adopted by parliament on June 16, 2017, the Bint Jbeil electoral district merged into a Marjayoun-Nabatieh-Hasbaya-Bint Jbeil district.
