= Loyalty to the Resistance Bloc =

Hezbollah's political party in Lebanon's parliament

Loyalty to the Resistance Bloc كتلة الوفاء للمقاومة
- Chamber: Parliament of Lebanon
- Member parties: Hezbollah
- President: Mohammad Raad
- Representation: 15 / 128 (12%)

The Loyalty to the Resistance Bloc (Arabic: كتلة الوفاء للمقاومة) is the political wing of Hezbollah in the Parliament of Lebanon. Along with Amal, it dominates the March 8 Alliance and has held two seats in the Lebanese cabinet since 2012. The party is currently led by Hezbollah member and prominent Shi'a politician Mohammad Raad.

== Historical election results ==
Election	Seats	Change	Ref
1992	12 / 128 (9%)	New	
1996	9 / 128 (7%)	▼3	
2000	12 / 128 (9%)	▲3	
2005	14 / 128 (11%)	▲2	
2009	13 / 128 (10%)	▼1	
2018	13 / 128 (10%)	Steady	
2022	15 / 128 (12%)	▲2	

== Affiliated MPs ==
=== 2009 election ===
The Bloc won 13 of the 128 seats in the 2009 general election:

Name	Party/Bloc	District	Religion
Ali Ammar	Hezbollah	Baabda	Shia
Bilal Farhat	Hezbollah	Baabda	Shia
Mohammad Fneish	Hezbollah	Tyre	Shia
Nawwaf Moussawi	Hezbollah	Tyre	Shia
Hassan Fadlallah	Hezbollah	Bint Jbeil	Shia
Mohammad Raad	Hezbollah	Nabatieh	Shia
Ali Fayyad	Hezbollah	Hasbaya–Marjeyoun	Shia
Hussein Moussawi	Hezbollah	Baalbeck–Hermil	Shia
Hussein el Hage Hassan	Hezbollah	Baalbeck–Hermil	Shia
Nawwar el Sahili	Hezbollah	Baalbeck–Hermil	Shia
Ali Mekdad	Hezbollah	Baalbeck–Hermil	Shia
Elwalid Succariyeh	Hezbollah	Baalbeck–Hermil	Sunni
Kamel al-Rifai	Hezbollah	Baalbeck–Hermil	Sunni

=== 2018 election ===
The Bloc won 12 of the 128 seats in the 2018 general election:

Name	Party/Bloc	District	Religion
Ali Ammar	Hezbollah	Baabda	Shia
Amin Sherri	Hezbollah	Beirut II	Shia
Nawwaf Moussawi	Hezbollah	Tyre–Zahrani	Shia
Hussein Jashi	Hezbollah	Tyre–Zahrani	Shia
Hassan Fadlallah	Hezbollah	Bint Jbeil	Shia
Mohammad Raad	Hezbollah	Nabatieh	Shia
Ali Fayyad	Hezbollah	Hasbaya–Marjeyoun	Shia
Anwar Jomma	Hezbollah	Zahle	Shia
Hussein el Hage Hassan	Hezbollah	Baalbeck–Hermil	Shia
Ibrahim Mousawi	Hezbollah	Baalbeck–Hermil	Shia
Ali Mekdad	Hezbollah	Baalbeck–Hermil	Shia
Ihab Hamadeh	Hezbollah	Baalbeck–Hermil	Shia

=== 2022 election ===
The Bloc won 15 of the 128 seats in the 2022 general election:

Name	Party/Bloc	District	Religion
Ali Ammar	Hezbollah	Baabda	Shia
Amin Sherri	Hezbollah	Beirut II	Shia
Raed Berro	Hezbollah	Jbeil	Shia
Hassan Ezzidine	Hezbollah	Tyre–Zahrani	Shia
Hussein Jashi	Hezbollah	Tyre–Zahrani	Shia
Hassan Fadlallah	Hezbollah	Bint Jbeil	Shia
Mohammad Raad	Hezbollah	Nabatieh	Shia
Ali Fayyad	Hezbollah	Hasbaya–Marjeyoun	Shia
Rami Hamdan	Hezbollah	Zahle	Shia
Yanal Al Solh	Independent	Baalbeck–Hermil	Sunni
Melhem Houjari	Independent	Baalbeck–Hermil	Sunni
Hussein el Hage Hassan	Hezbollah	Baalbeck–Hermil	Shia
Ibrahim Mousawi	Hezbollah	Baalbeck–Hermil	Shia
Ali Mekdad	Hezbollah	Baalbeck–Hermil	Shia
Ihab Hamadeh	Hezbollah	Baalbeck–Hermil	Shia
