= Nawar al-Sahili =

Lebanese politician

Nawar al-Sahili (Arabic: نوار الساحلي; born 1967 in Hermel District) is a Shia Lebanese politician, and a former member of parliament representing the Baalbeck/Hermil district. He is part of Hezbollah's bloc.

== Wedding controversy ==
In July 2021, al-Sahili was widely criticized on social media after images and video circulated of his daughter's wedding. Criticism focused on the cost and extravagance of the wedding during a time of severe economic hardship in Lebanon. Al-Sahili apologized publicly, claiming that he had not paid for the wedding, and announced the suspension of all his party activities.

== See also ==
- Lebanese Parliament
- Members of the 2009-2013 Lebanese Parliament
- Hezbollah
