= Hussein Moussawi =

Lebanese politician

Hussein Moussawi (Arabic: حسين الموسوي; born 1943 in Al-Nabi Shayth) is a Shia Lebanese politician who is a member of the Hezbollah. Boaz Ganor and Miri Halperin Wernli assert that in 2006 Moussawi and his brother Hashem Moussawi were involved in the making of exact copies of the drug Captagon, illegal in most countries, which they distributed to the Arab world.

Hussein Moussawi served in the Lebanese Parliament representing the Baalbeck/Hermil district. As of 2010 he was part of Lebanon's Loyalty to the Resistance bloc in the Parliament.

== See also ==
- Members of the 2009-2013 Lebanese Parliament
