= Mekdad =

Mekdad is a surname. Notable people with the surname include:

- Ali Mekdad (born 1961), Lebanese politician
- Faisal Mekdad (born 1954), Syrian diplomat and politician
