= Elections in Lebanon =

Elections in Lebanon are allotted to occur every four years. Every citizen is allowed to vote, but the positions are constitutionally allocated by religious affiliation. Lebanon was ranked second most electoral democracy in the Middle East according to V-Dem Democracy indices in 2023 with a score of 0.157 out of 1. Those who are above 21 and are non active military personnel are permitted to vote.

Elections in Lebanon are made up of loose coalitions, usually organized locally, which are formed for electoral purposes by negotiation among clan leaders and candidates representing various religious communities; such coalitions usually exist only for the election and rarely form a cohesive block in the Parliament after the election. No single party has ever won more than 12.5 percent of the seats in the Parliament, and no coalition of parties has won more than 35 percent.

== Parliamentary electoral system ==
=== Taif Agreement ===
Lebanon's national legislature is the Parliament of Lebanon (Arabic: مجلس النواب, romanized: Majlis An-Nouwab, lit. ''House of Representatives''). Since the elections of 1992, the first since the reforms of the Taif Agreement of 1989 removed the built-in majority previously enjoyed by Christians, the Parliament is composed of 128 seats with a term of four years.

Seats in the Parliament are confessionally distributed but elected by universal suffrage. Each religious community has an allotted number of seats in the Parliament (see the table below). They do not represent only their co-religionists, however; all candidates in a particular constituency, regardless of religious affiliation, must receive a plurality of the total vote, which includes followers of all confessions. The system was designed to minimize inter-sectarian competition and maximize cross-confessional cooperation: candidates are opposed only by co-religionists, but must seek support from outside their own faith in order to be elected.

In practice, this system has led to charges of gerrymandering. The opposition Qornet Shehwan Gathering, a group opposed to the previous pro-Syrian governments, has claimed that constituency boundaries have been drawn so as to allow many Shi'a Muslims to be elected from Shi'a-majority constituencies (where the Hezbollah Party is strong), while allocating many Christian members to Muslim-majority constituencies, forcing Christian politicians to represent Muslim interests. Similar charges, but in reverse, were made against the Chamoun administration in the 1950s.

The following table sets out the confessional allocation of seats in the Parliament before and after the Taif Agreement.

Parliament of Lebanon seat allocation
Confession	Before Taif	After Taif
Maronite Catholic	30	34
Eastern Orthodox	11	14
Melkite Catholic	6	8
Armenian Orthodox	4	5
Armenian Catholic	1	1
Protestant	1	1
Other Christian minorities	1	1
Total Christians	54	64
Sunni	20	27
Shi'ite	19	27
Alawite	0	2
Druze	6	8
Total Muslims + Druze	45	64
Total	99	128

Currently, there are plans to reform Lebanon's election laws at least before the 2028 Lebanese general election. Among the changes most likely are a reduction of the voting age from 21 to 18, a more proportional electoral system, reforms to the oversight of elections and an invitation for Lebanese voters from abroad to register to vote in Lebanese embassies, although there is currently no clear promise of them being able to vote from abroad.

Especially outside the major cities, elections tend to focus more on local than national issues, and it is not unusual for a party to join an electoral ticket in one constituency while aligned with a rival party – even an ideologically opposite party – in another constituency.

Lebanese presidential elections are indirect, with the President being elected to a 6-year term by the Parliament.

=== 2008 Doha Agreement ===
Adopting the kaza as an electoral constituency in conformity with the 1960 law, whereby the districts of Marjayoun-Hasbaya, Baalbek-Hermel and West Bekaa-Rashaya remain as a single electoral constituency each. As for Beirut, it was divided in the following manner: The first district: Achrafieh – Rmeil – Saifi The second district: Bachoura – Medawar – the Port The third district: Minet al-Hosn – Ain al-Mreisseh – Al-Mazraa – Mousseitbeh – Ras Beirut – Zoqaq al-Blat.

Elections took place on June 7, 2009. The Rafik Hariri Martyr List, an anti-Syrian bloc led by Saad Hariri, captured control of the legislature winning 71 of the 128 available seats. The Amal-Hezbollah alliance won 30 seats, with 27 seats going to the Free Patriotic Movement and allied parties.

=== 2017 electoral law ===
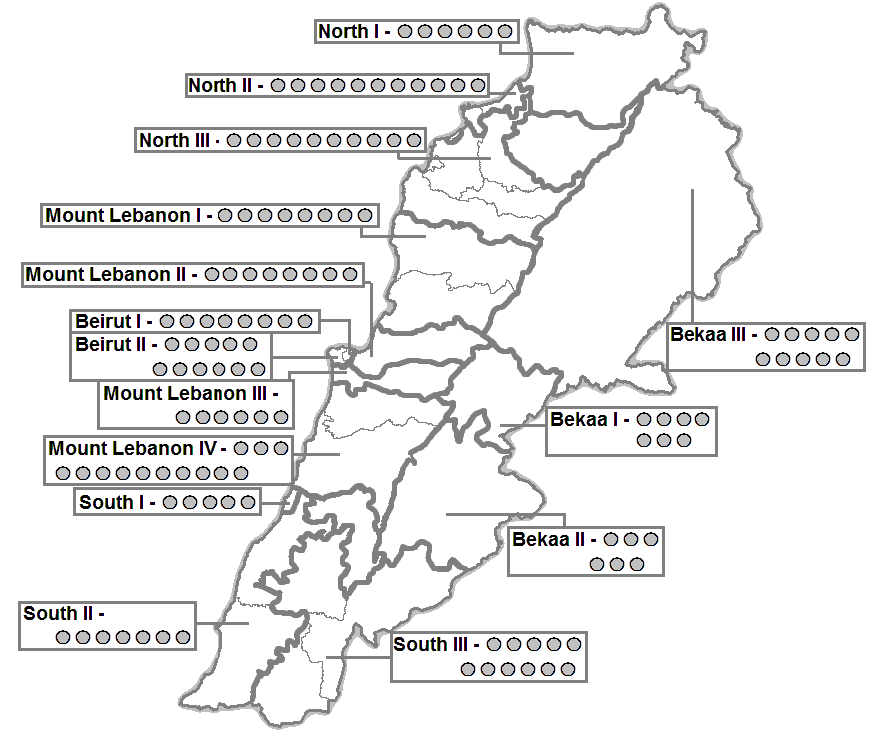
Distribution of seats between electoral districts per the 2017 law

On 15 May 2013, the Parliament extended its mandate for 17 months, due to the deadlock over the electoral law. And, on 5 November 2014, the Parliament enacted another extension, thus keeping its mandate for an additional 31 months, until 20 June 2017, and on 16 June 2017 the Parliament in turn extended its own mandate an additional 11 months to hold elections according to a much-anticipated reformed electoral law. After extending its term for 9 years, a new parliament was elected on 6 May 2018 in the 2018 general election. According to the Lebanese constitution and the electoral law of 2017, elections are held on a Sunday during the 60 days preceding the end of the sitting parliament's mandate. In June 2017 a new electoral law was passed. The previous system (under which the 128 members of parliament were elected from 26 multi-member constituencies under multiple non-transferable vote, and the candidates with the highest number of votes within each religious community were elected) with a new electoral law instituting proportional representation in 15 multi-member constituencies while still maintaining the confessional distribution. However, the 7 out of the 15 of the electoral districts are divided into 2 or more 'minor districts' (largely corresponding to the smaller electoral districts from the old electoral law). Where applicable, preference vote is counted on the 'minor district' level. With the 2017 electoral law, the country switched from a plurality voting system to a list-based proportional representation system.

== Presidential elections ==
Thirty to sixty days before the expiration of a president's term, the speaker of the Chamber of Deputies calls for a special session to indirectly elect a new president, which selects a candidate for a six-year term on a secret ballot in which a two-thirds majority is required to elect. If no candidate receives a two-thirds majority, a second ballot is held in which only a majority is required to elect. An individual cannot be reelected president until six years have passed from the expiration of his or her first term.

== Prime Minister and cabinet ==
After parliamentary elections, the President of Lebanon calls for binding consultations with all 128 members of parliament. During these consultations, MPs nominate candidates for the Prime Minister position, specifically a Sunni candidate, as per Lebanon's confessional political system. The candidate who receives the majority of votes becomes the Prime Minister-designate. This process operates on a first-past-the-post basis, meaning the candidate needs only to secure more votes than any other nominee, not an absolute majority of 65 votes. Once the Prime Minister-designate is selected, they meet with the President to discuss the composition of the new government. This stage involves negotiations among political parties regarding ministerial positions in which it must be split between Muslims and Christians and a share for the president, parliamentary majority and opposition.

== See also ==
- Cedar Revolution
- Electoral calendar
- Electoral system
- 2007 Lebanese by-elections
- 2022–2025 Lebanese presidential election
- 2022 Lebanese general election
