= Elwalid Succariyeh =

Lebanese politician

Elwalid Succariyeh (Arabic: الوليد محمد سكرية) is a Lebanese member of parliament representing the Baalbeck-Hermel district. Born to a Sunni family, he is part of Hezbollah's bloc. He was elected a member of the Lebanese Parliament in 2009, replacing his brother Ismael Succariyeh.

== See also ==
- Lebanese Parliament
- Members of the 2009-2013 Lebanese Parliament
- Hezbollah
