= Abdelmajid Saleh =

Lebanese politician

Abdel Majid Saleh (Arabic: عبد المجيد صالح) is a Shia Lebanese member of parliament representing the Tyre district. He is a member of the Amal Movement led by Nabih Berri which is part of the opposition. He was first elected in 2005 to replace recently deceased MP Ali Amine and was re-elected in 2009.

== See also ==
- Lebanese Parliament
- Members of the 2009-2013 Lebanese Parliament
- Amal Movement
