= Ali Ammar (politician) =

Lebanese politician

Ali Fadel Ammar (Arabic: عَلِيّ فَاضِل عَمَّار; born 1956) was born in Borj al-Barajneh neighborhood in Beirut and is a Lebanese politician from Hezbollah.

== Biography ==
He started as a public school teacher before becoming a member of the Parliament of Lebanon in 1992. He is one of the most publicized and controversial figures in Hezbollah, and is famous for his outbursts of anger and his radical language.

A former professional footballer, he was first elected Shia MP for Baabda District in 1992, was ousted in 1996 but regained his parliamentary seat in 2000 and held on to it in the 2005, 2009, 2018, and 2022 elections. He is a member of the Loyalty to the Resistance Bloc and currently serves as the MP for the Baabda District.

On September 17, 2024, Ammar's son, Mehdi, a member of Hezbollah, was killed at the age of 40 when Hezbollah pagers exploded across Lebanon. Mehdi was buried the following day in a coffin draped in the yellow Hezbollah flag and carried by Hezbollah members in military uniform.

== See also ==
- List of members of the 2005–2009 Lebanese Parliament
- List of members of the 2009–2017 Lebanese Parliament
- List of members of the 2018–2022 Lebanese Parliament
- List of members of the 2022–2026 Lebanese Parliament
