= Christian Democratic Union (Lebanon) =

Political party in Lebanon

The Christian Democratic Union of Lebanon is a centre-right party that is headed by Lebanese MP Neemtallah Abi Nasr. and part of March 8 Alliance.
