= Alexander Matossian =

Lebanese politician

Alexander Abraham Matossian (born 20th-century) is a Lebanese politician from Tashnag, and a former member of the Parliament of Lebanon.

== See also ==
- List of members of the 2018–2022 Lebanese Parliament
