= Camille Khoury =

Lebanese politician

Camille Khoury (Arabic: كميل خوري; born 1961 in Lebanon), is the Free Patriotic Movement representative in the Matn riding near Beirut, Lebanon. In August 2007, Khoury was elected in Matn over former Lebanese president Amine Gemayel by a margin of 418 votes. The official tally was 39,534 against 39,116 for Gemayel. The seat had been vacant since the murder of Pierre Amine Gemayel, who was killed in an attack in Lebanon earlier that year.

According to a pro-government website, Khoury's victory was attributed to the support from 70% of Armenian voters, 97% of Shi'a voters, and 10% of Sunni voters. Former President Amine Gemayel won 57% of the Maronite Christian vote.
