= Ghazi Zaiter =

Lebanese politician

Minister of Public Works and Transportation
- In office 2014–2020

Personal details
- Born: 1949 (age 76–77) Qasr, Lebanon
- Party: Amal Movement
- Children: Lama, Mohammed, and Ziad

Ghazi Zaiter (Arabic: غازي زعيتر; born 1949 in Qasr, Lebanon) is a Lebanese member of parliament representing the Baalbeck-Hermel district. Born to a Shia family, he was Minister of Defense from 1998 to 2000. He also served as Minister of Agriculture, Public Works, Industry and Social Affairs. He is part of the Amal Movement led by Nabih Berri which is part of the opposition after the 2009 election.

== Beirut explosion scrutiny ==
During the 2020 Beirut explosion, Ghazi Zaiter was Minister of Public Works and Transportation at the time and has been under scrutiny since. He had been responsible for dealing with the ship carrying 2,750 tons of ammonium nitrate that docked on Beirut's Port in 2013. Investigations revealed that Zaiter was among the officials who failed to act on repeated warnings about the dangers posed by the ammonium nitrate. In December 2020, he was charged with negligence leading to the blast. However, he and fellow Amal MP Ali Hassan Khalil invoked parliamentary immunity to avoid prosecution and declined to appear for questioning.

In addition, breakthroughs from Al Jadeed's interview with the ship's captain, Boris Prokoshev, have brought to light that the crew's lawyer who helped them abandon the ship in Beirut had been Mohammed Zaiter, Ghazi Zaiter's son. With the explosion of the ship's content in 2020, many have viewed Zaiter's inaction towards the ship as incriminating.

On 2 June 2025 it was reported that he will be summons by judge Tarek Bitar for questioning. Zaiter will be interrogated as a defendant

In 2026, Zeiter and Khalil were charged with obstruction of justice on the Beirut Blast case, and were obliged to pay 110 Billion Lebanese Lira.

== See also ==
- Lebanese Parliament
- Members of the 2009-2013 Lebanese Parliament
- Amal Movement
- 2020 Beirut explosions
