= Ali Fayyad =

Lebanese politician

Ali Fayyad (Arabic: علي فياض; born 1962 in Tayibe) is a Lebanese Member of Parliament, from Hezbollah and part of the March 8 alliance, representing the Marjeyoun/Hasbaya district. He was elected in June 2009. He is also Director of the Hezbollah think tank, The Studies and The Documentation Center, in Lebanon.

== Career ==
Ali Fayyad is a shiite Muslim. He is considered one of the founding members of Hezbollah, an organization designated as a terror organization by the United States and the European Union. He founded the “Educational Mobilization” of Hezbollah in 1982. He worked as a "central educational official" for Hezbollah from 1983 to 1990. Fayyad was in Hezbollah's Politburo from 1987. He was appointed to head Hezbollah's media office in the early 1990s (from 1990 to 1994). Fayyad became vice president of Hezbollah's planning committee and in 2009 the head of Consultative Center for Documentation and Studies, a think tank belonging to Hezbollah. From 2009 he represents Hezbollah in the Lebanese parliament.

== See also ==
- Members of the 2009-2013 Lebanese Parliament
- Hezbollah
