= Ali Khreis =

Lebanese politician

Member of the Lebanese Parliament

Personal details
- Party: Amal Movement

Ali Khreis (Arabic: علي خريس) is a Shia Lebanese member of parliament representing the Tyre district. He is part of the Amal Movement led by Nabih Berri.

== See also ==
- Lebanese Parliament
- Members of the 2009-2013 Lebanese Parliament
- Amal Movement
