= Ali Mekdad =

Lebanese politician

Ali el Mekdad (Arabic: علي المقداد; born 1961 in Maqne) is a Lebanese politician and an elected Shia member of the Lebanese parliament, representing the Baalbeck/Hermil district since 2009. He is part of the Hezbollah party parliamentary bloc.

== See also ==
- Lebanese Parliament
- Members of the 2009-2013 Lebanese Parliament
- Hezbollah
