= Antoine Saad =

Lebanese politician (1937–2025)

- أنطوان سعد

Member of the Parliament of Lebanon for West Bekaa - Rachaya
- In office June 2005 – 6 May 2018

Personal details
- Born: 5 December 1937 Rashaya, Lebanon
- Died: 3 March 2025 (aged 87)
- Political party: PSP
- Occupation: Military officer

Antoine Saad (Arabic: أنطوان سعد; 5 December 1937 – 3 March 2025) was a Lebanese politician of the Progressive Socialist Party (PSP).

== Life and career ==
Born in Rashaya in 1937, Saad served in the Lebanese Armed Forces and obtained the rank of General in 1994 before retiring in 1998. A personal friend of Walid Jumblatt, he was opposed to the Assad regime in Syria and to politician Michel Aoun. He was arrested on 1 January 1990, accused of attempting a coup, until his release by Elias Hrawi.

In 2005, Saad was elected to the Parliament as a Greek Orthodox deputy from West Bekaa - Rachaya on the March 14 Alliance list, defeating pro-Syria politician Elie Ferzli. He served in the Jumblatt majority government and was re-elected in 2009.

Saad died on 3 March 2025 at the age of 87.
