= Ibrahim Mousawi =

Lebanese journalist and spokesman for the Islamist group Hezbollah

Ibrahim Mousawi (Arabic: إبراهيم الموسوي; also spelled Moussawi or El-Moussaoui, born 1965) is a Lebanese journalist and spokesman for the Islamist group Hezbollah. In 2026 the US government sanctioned him for his ties to Hezbollah.

== Biography ==
He was born in 1965 to a family from Baalbek and grew up in the southern suburbs of Beirut. Mousawi is Shiite. He has two BAs in Journalism and English literature from the Lebanese University and has worked as a head master at secondary schools. Mousawi is editor of the weekly Hezbollah newspaper al-Intiqad (Criticism) in Beirut. He has been quoted as a Hezbollah spokesman since at least 1998.

He joined the Hezbollah TV station Al Manar (the Beacon), which does not include Israeli officials in its broadcasts because, according to Mousawi, "It [Israel] is an enemy state," and "Why would you put spokesmen for an enemy state on the air?" He hosted a political talk show and worked as editor-in-chief of foreign news at Al Manar. In an article for the Daily Star in 2002, Mousawi explained the religious basis for suicide attacks in a fatwa of Mohammad Hussein Fadlallah. Jeffrey Goldberg wrote in the New Yorker magazine that Mousawi had said to him that "Jews are a lesion on the forehead of history." When Al-Manar was banned from French satellite TV for airing a 29-part Ramadan special Ash-Shatat (Diaspora) during October–November 2003, which featured the "Blood libel against Jews" and quoted extensively from the Protocols of the Elders of Zion, Mousawi said the ban resulted from "political pressure by the Jewish lobby". He earned his MA in Political Science from the American University of Beirut (AUB) in 2003.

Mousawi rose to prominence during the 2006 Lebanon War as a spokesman for Hezbollah. He said that "Pain is the only language that the enemy understands". Following the cessation of hostilities, Mousawi was invited to speak to European audiences in Ireland, Germany and the UK, where he was announced as a Hezbollah spokesman on posters of the Stop the War Coalition. Mousawi received a PhD in Political Islam from Birmingham University in 2007. The title of his dissertation was "Compatibility between Islam and democracy; Shiism and democracy under Wilayat Al-Faqih, Iran as a case study". He co-authored an article on "Hizbullah's Jihad Concept" and lectures on Political Science at AUB.

In October 2007, Mousawi was refused entry to Ireland on security grounds following a recommendation from the Gardaí and he is also barred from entering the United States because of his links with Hezbollah. The British Conservative Party tried to have Mousawi banned from Britain like Yusuf al-Qaradawi and Moshe Feiglin in February 2008, but failed. Mousawi's visit was condemned by Conservative Party Leader David Cameron in the House of Commons and by shadow Defence Minister Baroness Neville-Jones, a former chairwoman of the Joint Intelligence Committee.

In February 2009, Hezbollah publicly appointed Mousawi as its new media relations officer. When Mousawi was announced for a UK visit in March 2009, campaigners from the Centre for Social Cohesion pledged to seek an arrest warrant for him. He was banned from the UK in March 2009.

== Sanctions ==
In May 2026, it was reported that the US government had sanctioned Mousawi for his ties to Hezbollah an "supporting the terrorist group".
