= Nawwaf Moussawi =

Lebanese politician (born 1965)

Nawwaf Moussawi (Arabic: نواف الموسوي; born 3 April 1965) is a Shia Lebanese member of parliament who represented the Sour district. He is part of Hezbollah's bloc. He was as of 2004 head of Hezbollah's office of international relations.

== Controversies ==
In February 2019, Moussawi was suspended from the political activities within his party, due to his violation of a Hezbollah policy of avoiding arguments with rival politicians. The one-year suspension came after his spat with Samy Gemayel and Nadim Gemayel regarding the legitimacy of President Michel Aoun who managed, according to Moussawi, to reach his position under "the rifle of the resistance" but "not on an Israeli tank"; in reference to President Bachir Gemayel.

In July 2019, his daughter, Ghadir, was chased by her ex-husband on a highway, which raises concerns regarding Lebanese women's rights issues. This led to his resignation from the parliamentary bloc and his seat.

== See also ==
- Lebanese Parliament
- Members of the 2009-2013 Lebanese Parliament
- Hezbollah
