= Salim Saadeh =

Lebanese politician (born 1949)

Member of the Lebanese Parliament
- In office 2018–2022
- President: Michel Aoun
- In office 2000–2005
- President: Émile Lahoud
- In office 1992–1996
- President: Elias Hrawi

Personal details
- Born: 25 November 1949 (age 76) Amioun, Koura District, North Governorate, Lebanon
- Party: Syrian Social Nationalist Party
- Spouse: Norma Diab (m. 1982)
- Parent(s): Abdallah Saadeh; May Saadeh
- Education: American University of Beirut (BA); Washington University in St. Louis (MSc.)
- Occupation: Lebanese Parliament Member
- Profession: Economist, Financial Planner, Management Specialist
- Website: www.salimsaadeh.com

Salim Saadeh (Arabic: سليم "عبدالله" سعادة; born November 25, 1949) is a politician. He served for three terms as a representative for the Greek Orthodox Christians from Koura District (North Governorate, Lebanon) in the Lebanese parliament, respectively in 1992, 2000 and 2018 general elections. He is a prominent member of the Syrian Social Nationalist Party in Lebanon.

== Early life and education ==
Saadeh was born in Amioun (Koura District, North Governorate, Lebanon), in November 25, 1949, to a Greek Orthodox Christian, yet very secular family. His father, Abdallah Saadeh, was a prominent general physician and general surgeon throughout Lebanon and the Middle East. Until the early 1950s, he travelled back and forth to Saudi Arabia to carry out some of his tasks such as running one of the main hospitals in the Kingdom as well as providing medical care to the late Saudi King Abdulaziz "Ibn Saud". His mother, May Saadeh, was also a renowned physician and the first female obstetrician and gynecologist in Lebanon.

Saadeh spent his childhood between the city of Tripoli, where he attended Tripoli Evangelical School and his hometown Amioun.

== Career in the private sector ==
After graduating from the American University of Beirut, Saadeh joined the Lebanese cargo airline company TMA in 1974 as Director of the Planning Department. He left the company in 1976 in order to pursue his master's degree at Washington University in St. Louis in the United States.

Following his postgraduate studies, Saadeh joined Midmac Group - one of the largest contracting companies in the Middle East - in 1979. He was appointed as Director of Operations, a position he held until he was nominated as a member of parliament for the first time 1991.

== Political career ==
In 1992, Saadeh was elected Member of the Lebanese Parliament for the Greek Orthodox Christian seat in Koura. He was not reelected for the seat in the 1996 elections. Saade was elected a second time in the 2000 elections and served until 2005.

On 11 February 2020, protesters during the Lebanese protests hurled stones at Saadeh's car when he was heading to a Parliament session. However, he was injured in the head, yet he went to attend the session after being hospitalized.

In 2022, Saadeh lost the election.

== Personal life ==
Saadeh married Norma Diab in 1982.
