= Ali Hassan Khalil =

Lebanese politician

- علي حسن خليل
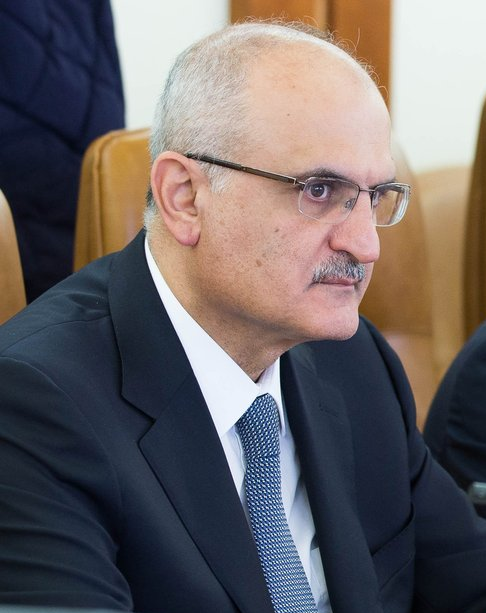
- Ali Hassan Khalil in 2016

Minister of Finance
- In office 15 February 2014 – 20 January 2020
- Prime Minister: Tammam Salam; Saad Hariri
- Preceded by: Mohammad Safadi
- Succeeded by: Ghazi Wazni

Minister of Health
- In office 13 June 2011 – 15 February 2014
- Prime Minister: Najib Mikati
- Preceded by: Mohamad Jawad Khalifeh
- Succeeded by: Wael Abou Faour

Minister of Agriculture
- In office 17 April 2003 – 26 October 2004
- Prime Minister: Rafic Hariri
- Preceded by: Ali Abdallah
- Succeeded by: Elias Skaff

Personal details
- Born: 15 July 1964 (age 62) Khiam, Lebanon
- Party: Amal Movement
- Spouse: Samia Saleh
- Children: 4
- Education: Lebanese University

Ali Hassan Khalil (Arabic: علي حسن خليل; born 15 July 1964) is a Lebanese politician, Member of Parliament, and former Minister of Finance.

Khalil is described as the "second most powerful man" in Amal behind Parliament Speaker Nabih Berri. He was sanctioned by the United States Treasury under the Magnitsky Act over "corruption" and "leveraging political power for financial gain".

== Career ==
Khalil was born to a Shia family in Khiam. Khalil, who studied law at the Lebanese University, is a member of parliament representing the Marjeyoun/Hasbaya district. He ran successfully in 1996, 2000, 2005, 2009, 2018 and 2022. He secured victory in the 2022 Lebanese general election for the "South 3" electoral district by garnering 13,155 votes as part of the "Hope and Loyalty" coalition.

Khalil was appointed minister of public health in the cabinet of Najib Mikati on 13 June 2011. Khalil's term ended when he was appointed minister of finance, replacing Mohammad Safadi in the post.

He was appointed minister of finance on three occasions: February 2014 under PM Tammam Salam, December 2016 and January 2020 under PM Saad Hariri.

He was sanctioned by the United States Department of Treasury on September 8, 2020, for allegations of corruption, providing material support and exploited his position to channel funds to terrorist organization Hezbollah and affiliated institutions, as well as attempted to circumvent U.S. sanctions enforcement.

In 2021, Judge Tarek Bitar issued an arrest warrant against Khalil after he failed to attend a scheduled interrogation over alleged involvement in the 2020 Beirut explosion that claimed over 200 lives. Khalil and fellow MP Ghazi Zeaiter have denied wrongdoing and cited parliamentary immunity to avoid prosecution.

In 2024, Judge Sabbouh Suleiman of the Court of Cassation revoked the warrants against Khalil due to a constitutional provision that protects members of parliament from arrest unless they are caught in the act of a crime or a vote is held to permit their prosecution.

In 2026, Khalil and Zeaiter were charged with obstruction of justice on the Beirut Blast case, and were obliged to pay 110 Billion Lebanese Lira.

== See also ==
- Members of the 2009–2013 Lebanese Parliament
- Amal Movement
