= Hassan Fadlallah =

Lebanese politician

Hassan Fadlallah (Arabic: حسن فضل الله، حسن; born 1967 in Aynata), is a Lebanese media mogul, educator, and member of parliament representing the Bint Jbeil district. He is part of Hezbollah March 8 alliance.

== Career ==
Hassan Fadlallah was born in Ainata in the Jabal Amil region to a Shia family. Fadlallah took a part in the creation of Hezbollah's radio network Al-Nour. Hezbollah is considered a terrorist organization by the United States and the European Union.

He was editor-in-chief of Al-Ahed. Fadlallah was the director of the news department of the Hezbollah television network Al-Manar. Between 1998 and 2004 Fadallah was in the central policymaking committee of Hezbollah. Fadallah heads Lebanese parliament's currently Media and Communications Committee. Fadallah is also part of the Finance and Budget Committee. Fadallah is also a teacher in the Lebanese university.

In 2018 Hassan Nasrallah announced that Fadlallah, who was a Hezbollah member of parliament and head of an anti-corruption committee, will supervise the corruption allegations concerning Hezbollah. It is estimated that this was more a publicity action, as the corruption in the militant group runs deep, especially when it concerns terrorism and military activities.

During the 2026 Lebanon war he strongly opposed efforts to disarm Hezbollah and criticized the government's approach. He has warned about Israeli actions, rejected compromise, and emphasized that the Lebanese state should focus on protecting civilians and rebuilding affected areas, while maintaining a hardline position on resistance.

== Personal life ==
His wife is from the Al-Faqih family, and they have several children: Muhammad, Youssef, Aya, and Jawad.

== Books ==
Fadlallah wrote the book Hizbullah and the Lebanese State: Pluralism, Power and Coexistence.

== See also ==
- Lebanese Parliament
- Members of the 2009-2013 Lebanese Parliament
- Hezbollah
