= Mohammad Raad =

Lebanese politician and Hezbollah leader

- محمد رعد
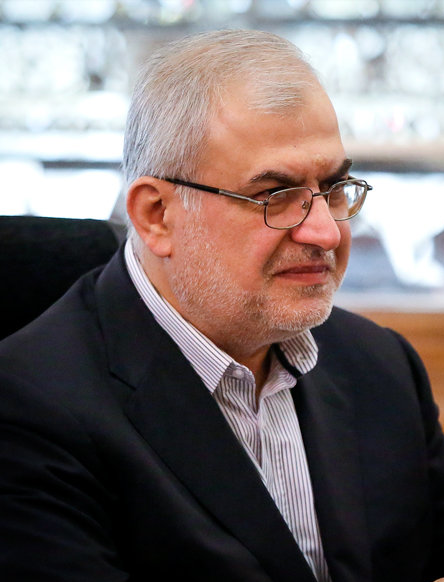
- Raad in 2017

Leader of the Loyalty to the Resistance Bloc
- Incumbent
- Assumed office 2000

Member of the Parliament of Lebanon
- Incumbent
- Assumed office 1992
- Constituency: Nabatieh

Personal details
- Born: 28 August 1955 (age 71) Beirut, Lebanon
- Party: Hezbollah
- Spouse: Fatima Barghul
- Education: Lebanese University

Mohammad Raad (Note: Arabic: محمد رعد) (born 28 August 1955) is a Lebanese politician of the Lebanese Shia Islamist political party and militia Hezbollah, who serves as member of parliament representing the Nabatieh District.

He leads Hezbollah's political wing called Loyalty to the Resistance Bloc in the Lebanese parliament, which was part of the 8 March Alliance. In 2019, he was sanctioned by the United States, pursuant to an order that targets terrorists and those providing support to terrorists or acts of terrorism.

== Early life and education ==
Raad was born in Beirut, Lebanon, and is Shia Muslim. His family is originally from the town of Jbaa in southern Lebanon. He holds a bachelor's degree in philosophy from the Lebanese University.

== Career ==
=== Early years ===
Raad is one of the leading figures of the Lebanese Shia Islamist political party and militia Hezbollah, and is the only member of the party to occupy his seat in Parliament (representing Natabieh) since 1992. He is one of the "ideologues" of the party, a member of its executive committee, and former chair of its political council. Raad was elected by the Iranian Majlis as Lebanon's only representative on the Iranian Guardian Council. He won a seat from Nabatieh in the 2000 general elections. He has been president of the Hezbollah's political wing Loyalty to the Resistance Bloc since 2000.

In 2001, he said: "Hezbollah is a military resistance party, and it is our task to fight the occupation of our land... There is no separation between politics and resistance."

In 2013, Raad was considered a potential candidate for Secretary-General of Hezbollah in the event that Hassan Nasrallah became the "supreme guide" of the organization, and the power allocated to the post of general secretary was reduced.

=== 2015–19 ===
In February 2015, he said that the West was "begging for" a nuclear agreement with Iran.

In January 2019, Raad condemned the “intervention” of the United States in Venezuela during the 2019 Venezuelan Presidential crisis, and confirmed Hezbollah’s support for Venezuelan president Nicolás Maduro.

In July 2019, he was sanctioned by the United States, pursuant to an order that targets terrorists and those providing support to terrorists or acts of terrorism.

In October 2019, demonstrators attacked the office of Raad, as they protested against government corruption and incompetence, and the risk of a Lebanese economic crisis.

=== 2020–present ===
In March 2024, Raad met with Russia's Foreign Minister Sergei Lavrov, and the following month he announced that Hezbollah would open a representative office in Moscow.

In June 2024, Raad criticized people for "going to the beach and nightclubs while the south is under attack." Journalist and MTV Lebanon TV host Dima Sadek wrote sarcastically on social media: "The weather is nice today. I am thinking of destroying the country while at the beach." MP Pierre Bou Assi responded to Raad: "All of Lebanon is collapsing due to your policies and your illusory and destructive divine victories. Have you strengthened any economic or social resilience in Lebanon? Do you think your Iranian rockets will feed the people?”

On 2 March 2026, Raad was reported to have been killed in an Israeli airstrike in Beirut in retaliation for Hezbollah firing rockets at Northern Israel during the 2026 Iran war; these reports turned out to be false. On 9 March 2026 he arrived to vote to postpone the parliamentary elections.

== Personal life ==
Raad is married to Fatima Al-Burghul and they have five children. His son Abbas, a member of Hezbollah's special operations forces Radwan Force unit, was killed during fighting with Israel following the 7 October 2023 attacks on Israel.

== See also ==
- List of members of the 2009–2017 Lebanese Parliament
