= Ayoub Hmayed =

Lebanese politician

Ayoub Hmayed is a Shia Lebanese member of parliament representing the Bint Jbeil district. He is part of the Amal Movement led by Nabih Berri.

== See also ==
- Lebanese Parliament
- Members of the 2009-2013 Lebanese Parliament
- Amal Movement
