= Lebanese Democratic Party =

Lebanese political party

Lebanese Democratic Party الحزب الديمقراطي اللبناني
- Abbreviation: LDP
- Leader: Talal Arslan
- Vice-chairman: Marwan Abou Fadel
- Founder: Talal Arslan
- Founded: 1 July 2001
- Headquarters: Choueifat
- Ideology: Conservatism; Druze interests
- Political position: Centre-right
- National affiliation: March 8 Alliance
- Parliament of Lebanon: 0 / 128
- Cabinet of Lebanon: 0 / 24

Party flag

Website
- Official Site

The Lebanese Democratic Party (Arabic: الحزب الديمقراطي اللبناني, romanized: al-ḥizb ad-dīmuqrāṭī al-Lubnānī) is a political party in Lebanon established by Prince Talal Arslan and Marwan Abou Fadel in 2001. Prince Talal is the son of Lebanese Druze leader Emir Magid Arslan and has presided over the party ever since its establishment.

The Lebanese Democratic Party is officially secular and has members from all Lebanese sects, but most of its support comes from the Druze, who support the Arslan family. It is part of the March 8 Alliance.

The party was represented in the Lebanese parliament in 2000 and in 2009. In the General elections of 2009, Talal Arslan won a seat in the Parliament representing the Aley district, and Fadi Awar the one representing the Baabda district.
