= Michel Moussa =

Lebanese politician and medical doctor

Member of the Lebanese Parliament

Personal details
- Born: 19 September 1949 (age 76) Maghdouche, Lebanon
- Party: Amal Movement
- Spouse: Jeanine Abou Khalil
- Children: Sary Moussa, Bassam Moussa
- Education: Cardiology at the University of Montpellier in France

Michel Moussa (Arabic: ميشال موسى; born 19 September 1949) is a Lebanese politician and medical doctor.

== Early life ==
Michel Moussa was born in Maghdouche, Lebanon in 1949 to a Christian Greek Catholic family.

== Education and career ==
Michel Moussa graduated from University of Montpellier as a Cardiologist in 1980. In 1992 Moussa was elected as member of the Lebanese Parliament for the Greek Catholic seat, in Zahrani, southern Lebanon and was reelected for this seat in the years 1996, 2000, 2005, 2009 and 2018. He currently heads the Parliamentary commission for Human Rights and is a member of the Foreign Affairs Parliamentary commission. Moussa was appointed Minister of Labor and Social Affairs under Prime minister Salim Hoss in 1998, Minister of Environment under Prime Minister Rafic Hariri in 2000 and Minister of State for Parliamentary Affairs again under Hariri in 2004.

== Personal life ==
Michel Moussa is married to Jeanine Abou Khalil and has two children, Sary (born 1987) and Bassam (born 1988).
