= Ali Ahmad Bazzi =

Lebanese politician

- علي أحمد بزي
- In office 2000–2022

Member of the Lebanese Parliament

Personal details
- Born: 1 September 1958 (age 68) Bint Jbeil
- Party: Amal Movement
- Education: Lebanese University, University of Central Michigan

Ali Ahmad Bazzi (Arabic: علي أحمد بزي, born on 1 September 1958) is a Lebanese politician and member of the Lebanese Parliament. He has represented the Bint Jbeil district of South Lebanon since 2000.

== Early life and education ==
Bazzi was born in Bint Jbeil on 1 September 1958. He received a bachelor's degree in political science and management from the Lebanese University in 1981. Later he obtained his master's degree in business administration from the University of Central Michigan in 1996.

== Career ==
When he was in the United States he had the following duties and tasks: The president of the American Lebanese Cultural Center, a member of the Arab American Institute, and a member of the Arab American Association against the Racial Discrimination in America. He was a teacher in American schools in Michigan from 1985 till 1987. He succeeded in many missions in America. He was an employee in the state of Michigan – social services department – from 1987 to 1991. He was also an employee in the recruitment office in Michigan from 1991 to 1993. Moreover, he was a federal employee in the American Labor Ministry from 1993 to 2000.

Then, he came to Lebanon to participate in the elections as an MP in the Lebanese Parliament for the district of Bint Jbeil, he succeeded in the elections in five consecutive rounds, and also he has been an MP for Amal Movement in the parliament since the year 2000.

He is a member of the Liberation and Development Bloc presided by Nabih Berry. Moreover, he is a member of the political Bureau of Amal Movement and is assigned by the presidential commission in Amal Movement to ensure the follow-up of the files related to the ministries of education, social affairs, health, and education. He is the head of the Parliamentary Friendship Committee with Austria and Cyprus. Finally, he is a member of the Parliamentary Friendship Committees with: Chile, Greece, European group, Turkey, Estonia, Britain, Germany, Pakistan, Armenia, and the United Arab Emirates.

In addition, he is the representative of Amal Movement and the Liberation and Development Bloc in the parliamentary commission which included various parliamentary blocs and Lebanese parties, to set a new law for the parliamentary elections between 2012 and 2017, and he presented the 64/64 proposal.

== See also ==
- Lebanese Parliament
- List of Lebanese Members of Parliament
- Mohammad Hussein Fadlallah
- Mohammed Baqir al-Hakim
