= Hasbaya =

Town in the Nabatieh Governorate, Lebanon

Hasbaya حاصبيا
- Municipality
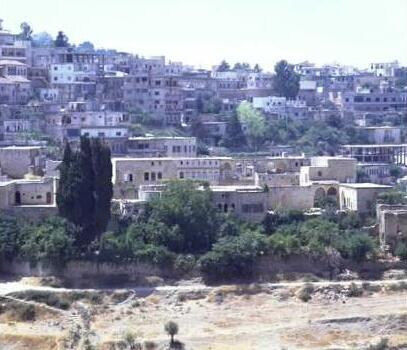
- Hasbaya Citadel

- Location in Lebanon
- Coordinates: 33°23′52″N 35°40′57″E
- Country: Lebanon
- Governorate: Nabatieh Governorate
- District: Hasbaya District
- Elevation: 750 m (2,460 ft)

Hasbaya or Hasbeiya (Arabic: حاصبيا, romanized: Ḥāṣbayā) is a municipality in Lebanon, situated at the foot of Mount Hermon, overlooking a deep amphitheatre from which a brook flows to the Hasbani River. In 1911, the population was about 5,000.

The town was a traditional seat of the Chehab family, local rulers under Ottoman suzerainty. They built the Chehabi Citadel, a prominent landmark in the town.

== History ==
Some travellers have attempted to identify Hasbeya with the biblical Baal-Gad or Baal-Hermon. In the New Testament, the mountain is the site of the transfiguration of Jesus.

During the Roman period there was a Temple of Hebbarieh in the area, as evident in the ruins at the foot of Mount Hermon.

=== Crusader period ===
The presence of Druze around Mount Hermon is documented since the founding of the Druze religion in the beginning of the 11th century.

The castle in Hasbaya was held by the crusaders under Count Oran, but in 1171 the Emirs of the Chehab family captured it after defeating the crusaders in a number of battles. In 1205 this family was confirmed in the lordship of the town and district, which they held till the present time.

The oldest standing ruins in Hasbaya date to the Crusader period. After the conquest of the area by the Chehabs Emirs, they fortified the square tower of the Crusader fort and transformed it into a big palace similar to Italian palaces and citadels of the Renaissance. On both sides of its main entrance is the lion, the emblem of the family. The upper floor has 65 rooms, and the largest is decorated with intricate wall paintings.

=== Mamluk period ===
The mosque was built by the Mamluk rulers in the 13th century.

=== Ottoman period ===
In 1826, an American Protestant mission was established in the town.

Scottish missionary John Wilson, who visited Hasbaya in the 1840s, reports that the local population of Hasbaya was estimated to include approximately 4,000 Christians, 1,000 Druze, 100 Muslims, and 100 Jews. The Jewish were of Sephardic background; two or three of them were stationary merchants; and most of the others travelling dealers. According to their own account, their ancestors, who had predominantly arrived from Austria, had settled in Wadi et-Teim about 100 years earlier.

In 1844, a portion of the local Orthodox Christian population converted to Protestantism under the influence of the American mission in Beirut.

During the 1860 civil conflict in Mount Lebanon, Hasbaya was one of several towns attacked by Druze, leading to a significant rout and massacre of the Christian inhabitants following a long siege. Seventeen Muslim Shihab emirs were also murdered by the Druze, which scholars believe occurred due to their defense of the Christians. Sitt Nayfa, the sister of Sa'id Janbulat, received commendation from the French consul for her efforts in protecting the wives of the emirs. On the other hand, the Druze refrained from pillaging the Protestant church in Hasbayya and did not target American missionaries.

The Prince of Wales toured the Middle East in the early 1860s, and he and his party stopped in Hasbaya on their way to Damascus. The Prince was told that between 800 and 1,000 Christians were killed here by the Druze in the fighting during 1860.

=== Modern period ===
Hasbaya in 1967

Hasbaya keeps its traditions alive and its workshops are still producing traditional clothing.

== Geography ==
The town of Hasbaya is the centre of the Hasbaya District. It can be reached from Marjayoun across the Hasbani bridge, or from Rachaya.

Hasbaya is the capital of the Wadi El Taym, a long fertile valley running parallel to the western foot of Mount Hermon. This mountain peak, also called Jabal al Sheikh, rises east of Hasbaya.

The town is watered by a small tributary of the Hasbani river. The river also waters the low hills of Wadi El Taym, which are covered with rows of olive trees, an important source of income.

Near Hasbaya were bitumen pits which were worked in antiquity and in the 19th century up to 1914. Production may have peaked at about 500 tons/year. To the north, at the source of the Hasbani, the ground is volcanic.

== Demographics ==
In 2014, Druze made up 68.43% and Christians made up 19.72% of registered voters in Hasbaya. 10.63% of the voters were Sunni Muslims.

== Sites of interest ==
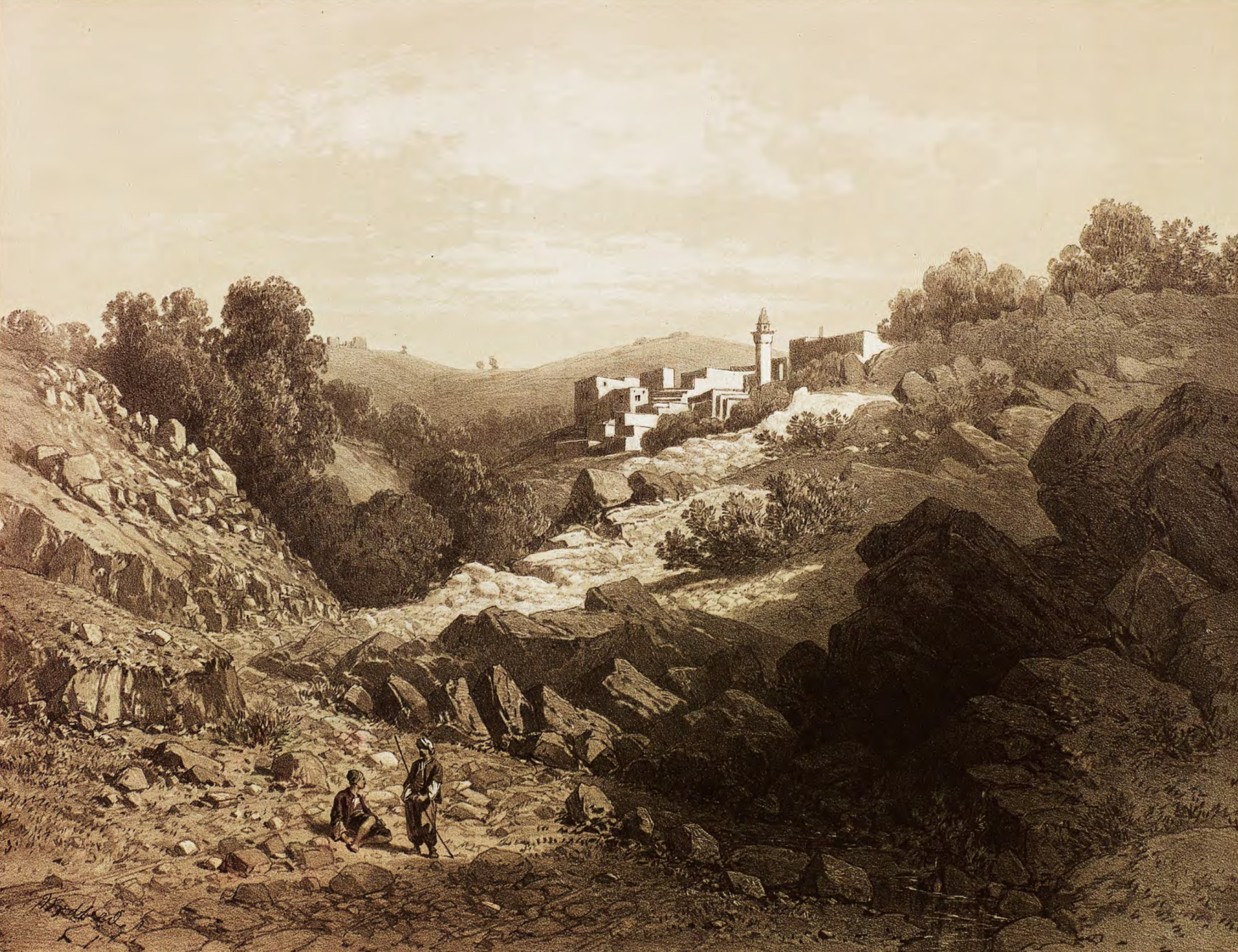
1857 sketch of Hasbaya by van de Velde

Hasbaya is a town full of history. A good deal of this history transpired at the huge citadel that is today Hasbaya's chief claim to fame.

Owned by the Chehab emirs, the citadel forms the major part of a Chehabi compound – a group of buildings surrounding an unpaved central square 150 metres long and 100 metres wide. Several medieval houses and a mosque make up the rest of the compound, which covers a total of 20,000 square metres. The citadel is situated on a hill overlooking a river which encircles it from the north. A site steeped in mystery, the citadel is so old its origins are uncertain and so big that even today no one is sure how many rooms it contains. The known history of the structure begins with the Crusaders, but it may go back even earlier to an Arab fortification or a Roman building. Won by the Chehabs from the Crusaders in 1172, the fortress was rebuilt by its new owners.

Since then it has been burned many times in battle and was often the scene of bloody conflict. In the 20th century, it was attacked by rockets during the Israeli occupation of South Lebanon. Amazingly, for almost all of the eight centuries since it fell to the Chehabs, the citadel has been occupied by members of the same family. Today actual ownership is shared by some fifty branches of the family, some of whom live there permanently.

=== The Citadel ===
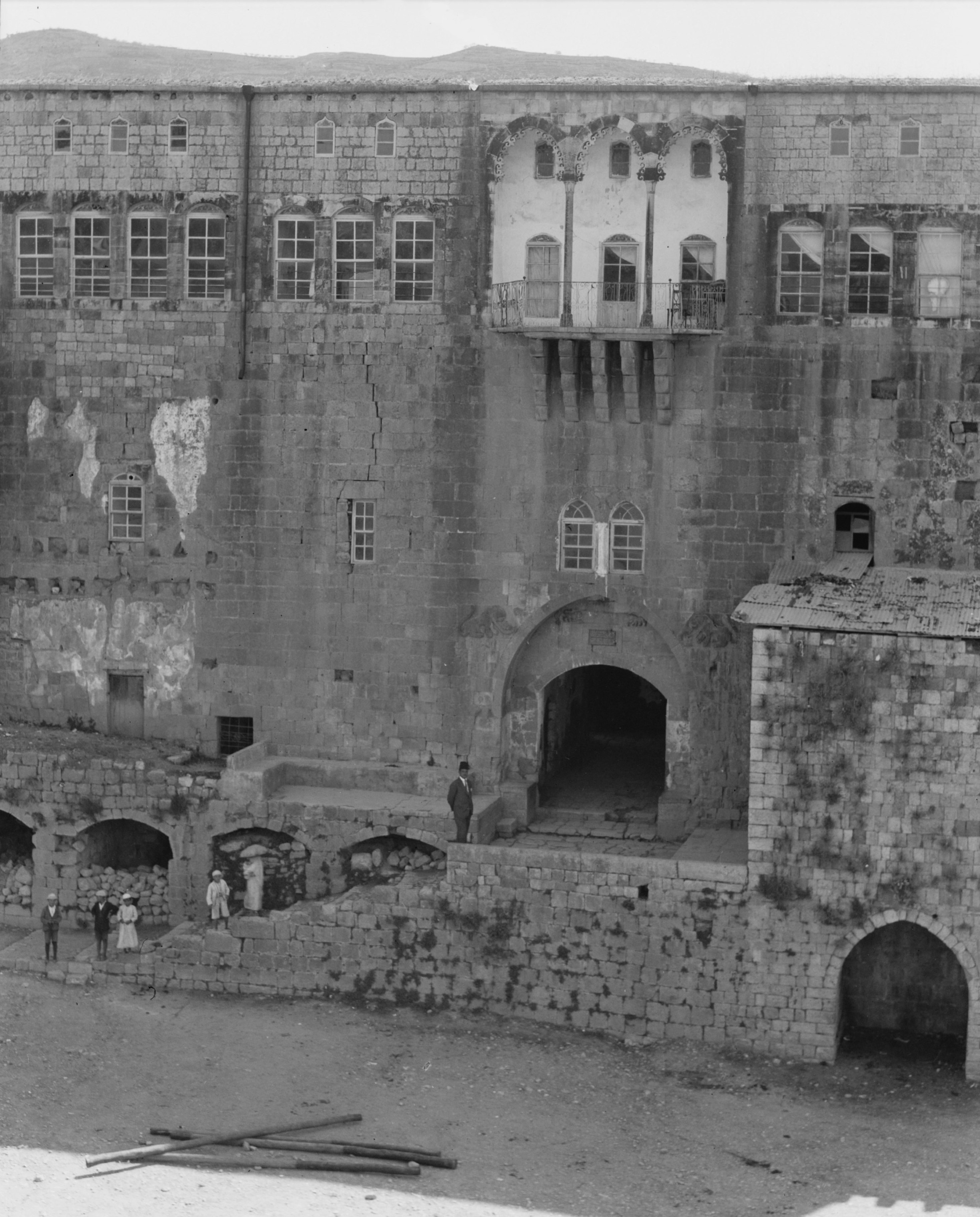
Emir Shahib's castle/citadel in 1925

The building consists of three floors above ground and three subterranean floors. Constructed in stages, often damaged and rebuilt, today the sprawling structure incorporate a mix of styles, building techniques and states of repair. The tower in the southwest corner and the eastern wall-both visible from the third floor – are easily identifiable as Crusader. Other medieval elements are arrow slit windows and machicolations-small openings through which hot oil or missiles were dropped on the enemy. Despite its primary function as a fortress, the castle also possesses many architectural features.

Wide steps lead to the main entrance, where the original Crusader door still swings smoothly on 800-year-old hinges. Four metres wide and three metres high, the passage allowed horsemen to enter the castle without dismounting.

Stone lions, a heraldic emblem of the Chehab family, decorate the wall on either side of the arched portal. Two large lions are depicted in chains, each beside a weak, unchained rabbit. A set of smaller lions appears within the arch above the doorway and just below that is a plaque in Arabic commemorating an addition to the castle made in the year 1009 Hejira by Emir Ali Chehab some 400 years ago. Once through the portal, you enter a huge stone paved courtyard surrounded by castle walls 1.5 meters thick. In addition to the attractive windows, old balconies and staircases, the courtyard has four main points of interest: a limited view of the dungeons, two important arched entrenches and a wing once occupied by the Pasha of Egypt Crusaders buried their dead here and prisoners were kept in its dungeons.

During the citadel's heyday the lower floors were also used to store water and other suppliers, as well as to house animals. At the far end of the courtyard is a wine arched opening set in a wall of alternating black and white stone. This was the entrance of the "diwan" or salon of Sitt Chams, wife of Bechir Chehab II, governor of Mount Lebanon between 1788 and 1840. To the left of the diwan is the wing occupied by ibrahim Pasha of Egypt during his campaign against the Ottomans in 1838.

Overlooking the modern village of Hasbaya in south Lebanon, the Chehabi Citadel occupied a strategic location for the armies of the First Crusade, who are believed to have built the original fortifications in the eleventh century. The strategically sited outpost was also used by the Chehabi emirs, who ousted the Crusaders from the area in the 1170s and rebuilt much of the citadel complex for military and residential use. Chehabi descendants have continually occupied the site up until this day. The 20,000-square-meter complex is centered around a large unpaved courtyard and contains residential buildings and a mosque. Its main portal features a carved image of a lion, the emblem of the Chehabi family.

Almost a millennium of occupation and war, combined with a lack of maintenance and drainage problems have left the citadel battered, with portions of it in danger of structural failure. A preliminary study of the conditions of the complex revealed that load-bearing walls of the buildings and fortifications are under stress and cracking. Some of the interior vaults and ceilings have collapsed or are nearing collapse, and architectural and interior decoration require additional assessment and repairs.

The Lebanese Foundation for the Preservation of the Emirs Chehabi Citadel–Hasbaya, led by a member of the Chehabi family, has been established for the purpose of conserving the complex.

=== More ===
In the direction of Marjeyun and also part of the Hasbaya Caza (3 km away from the town), there is Souk al Khan, which is located inside a pine forest at the crossing of Hasbaya, Rashaya, Kawkaba and Marjeyun roads.

There lies the ruins of an old khan where Ali, son of Fakhreddin Maan, was killed in a battle with the Ottoman army. In this khan, a popular weekly market held very Tuesday is visited by traders and visitors from all over the area. Near this site flows the Hasbani, a tributary of the Jordan River.

== Notable people ==
- Faris al-Khoury, Prime Minister of Syria (1944–1945, 1954–1958)
- Emir Khaled Chehab, Lebanese prime minister (1937, 1952 - 1953), minister of finance (1927 - 1928), deputy, and speaker of parliament (1936 - 1937).
- Assad Kotaite, International Civil Aviation Organization official, Secretary-General (1970–1976), and Council President (1976–2006
- Faris Nimr, (1856–1951), Lebanese journalist and intellectual
- Firas Hamdan, is one of 12 independent politicians who emerged from a mass anti-government protest movement in 2019. Hamdan was hit in the chest by a lead pellet in 2020 during a demonstration near parliament, days after a deadly explosion struck Beirut's port.

== See also ==
- Chehab family
- Druze in Lebanon
- List of Crusader castles

== Bibliography ==
- Pringle, D. (1997). Secular buildings in the Crusader Kingdom of Jerusalem: an archaeological Gazetter. Cambridge University Press. ISBN 0521-46010-7. (p. 50)
- Wilson, C.W., ed. (c. 1881). Picturesque Palestine, Sinai and Egypt. Vol. 2. New York: D. Appleton. (pp. 132, 133)
