= Hermel District =

Coordinates: 34°23′29″N 36°23′45″E

- District
- قضاء الهرمل
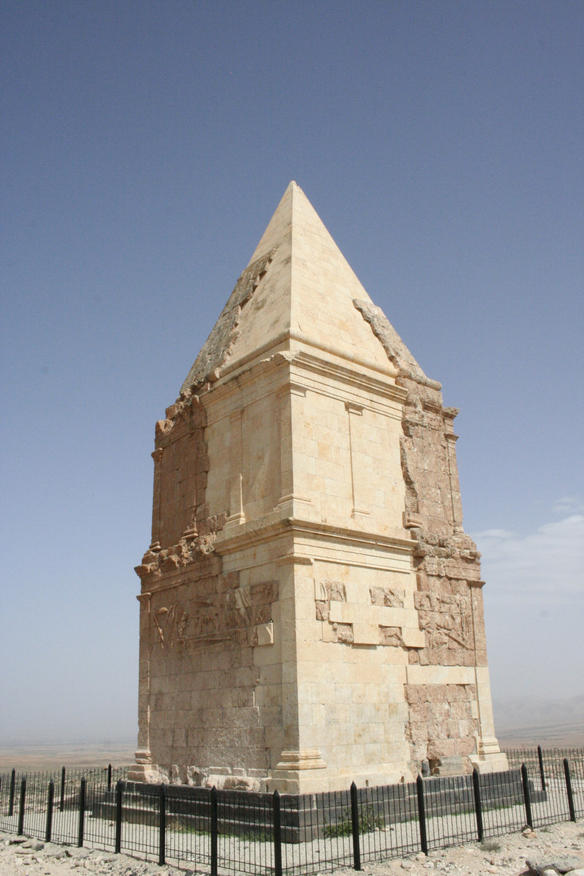
- Hermel Pyramid

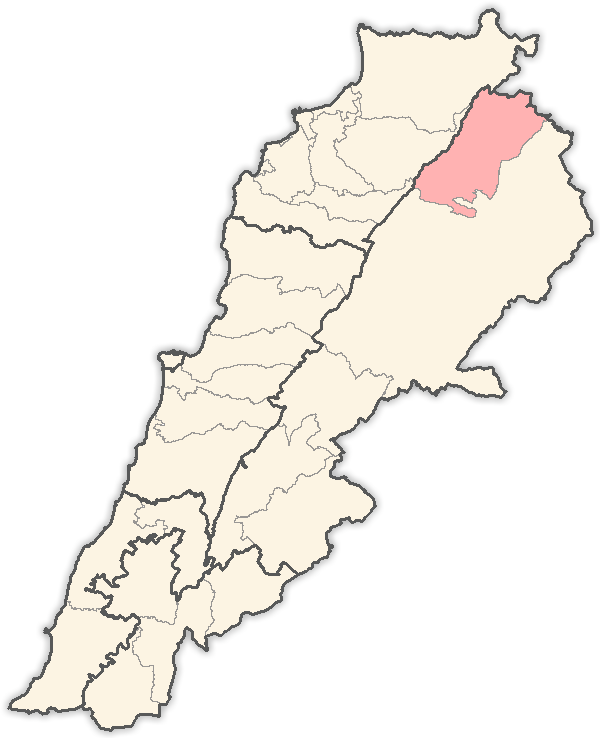
- Location in Lebanon
- Country: Lebanon
- Governorate: Baalbek-Hermel Governorate
- Capital: Hermel

Area
  - Total: 282 sq mi (731 km^{2})

Population
  - Estimate (31 December 2017): 69,997
  - Density: 250/sq mi (95/km^{2})
- Time zone: UTC+2 (EET)
  - Summer (DST): UTC+3 (EEST)

The Hermel District (Arabic: قضاء الهرمل) is a district in the Baalbek-Hermel Governorate of Lebanon. Its population is estimated at 69,997 inhabitants, with its semi-arid land contributing to its low population density. It borders the Akkar District and Miniyeh-Danniyeh District on its west, the Baalbek District in the south and east, and Syria on its north.

The capital of the Hermel District is Hermel.

On January 3, 2021, an explosion at a fuel storage facility in the town of Al-Qasr injured 10.

== Demographics ==
According to registered voters in 2014:

Year	Christians			Muslims				Druze
Year	Total	Maronites	Other Christians	Total	Shias	Sunnis	Alawites	Druze
2014	1.34%	1.23%	0.11%	98.49%	95.09%	3.22%	0.19%	0.01%
