= 2018 Lebanese general election in Beirut II =

- 23 March 2021
- 11 seats in the Lebanese parliament for the Beirut II constituency
- Turnout: 40.72%
Party	Leader	Vote %	Seats	+/–
Future Movement	Saad Hariri	41.04	5	
Hezbollah	Hassan Nasrallah	15.96	1	
Al-Ahbash		9.05	1	
NDP	Fouad Makhzoumi	7.89	1	
Amal	Nabih Berri	5.45	1	
FPM	Gebran Bassil	1.33	1	
PSP	Walid Jumblatt	1.32	1	
This lists parties that won seats. See the complete results below.
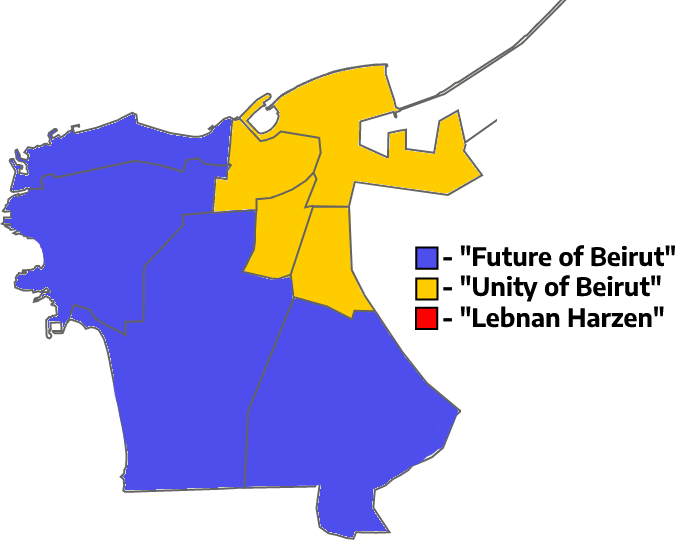

Voting to elect eleven members of the Lebanese parliament took place in the Beirut II district (one of two electoral districts in the city) on 6 May 2018, part of the general election of that year. The constituency had 353,164, out of whom 143,829 voted. Residents elect 6 Sunnis, 2 Shias, 1 Druze, 1 Greek Orthodox and 1 Evangelical.

== Demographics ==
The Beirut II electoral district covers 8 quartiers (neighbourhoods) of the Lebanese capital: Port, Bachoura, Dar El Mreisse, Mazraa, Minet El Hosn, Moussaitbeh, Ras Beirut and Zuqaq al-Blat. The electorate is predominantly Sunni (62.1%). 20.6% of the electorate is Shia, 5% Greek Orthodox, 3.41% Minorities, 1.86% Maronite, 1.65% Armenian Orthodox, 1.63% Greek Catholic, 1.55% Druze, 1.31% Jews (Note: Beirut II has the highest number of registered Jewish voters in Lebanon, constituting 1.31% of the electorate. However, these numbers do not reflect actual demographics following Jewish migration out of Lebanon, in 2009 election only 5 Jews cast their votes in western Beirut.), 0.81% Evangelical (Protestant) and 0.03% Alawite.

== Voting ==
In the 2009 election, the Future Movement had won the election in West Beirut. But this time, a number of lists seeks to challenge the Future dominance over the Sunni electorate, "Beirut al-Watan" (alliance of al-Jamaa al-Islamiah and Al Liwaa newspaper editor Salah Salam), "Beiruti Opposition" (fielded by Ashraf Rifi), "Lebnan Herzen", "We are All Beirut" and "Dignity of Beirut" (led by former judge Khaled Hammoud).

The erstwhile March 8 bloc split into two lists. Hezbollah, Amal, Al-Ahbash and the Free Patriotic Movement fielded the "Unity of Beirut" list, whilst the People's Movement and Al-Mourabitoun fielded the "Voice of the People" list. Omar Ghandour, candidate of the Islamic Action Front, prominent businessman and former president of the Nejmeh Sporting Club, was named president of "Unity of Beirut" list. The SSNP faction of Ali Haidar fielded a candidate on the "Voice of the People" list. Naamat Badruddin, also on the "Voice of the People" list was a leader during the 2015 protests, also known as the "You Stink movement".

Under the previous electoral law the Future Movement could easily win landslides in West Beirut. But under the new electoral law analysts argued that the Future Movement could lose a number of seats. Apart from the Hezbollah-Amal-FPM list (expected to win the Shia vote), the main perceived challengers to the Future Movement were the "Beirut al-Watan" list and the "Lebnan Herzen" list of prominent businessman Fouad Makhzoumi. Nevertheless, the Beirut al-Watan list included several figures close to the Hariri family and Salam pledged to support the "Sunni za'im" Hariri to remain Prime Minister of Lebanon.

Prior to the deadline to register lists, the Lebanese Democratic Party announced the withdrawal of its candidate for the Druze seat. Likewise the Lebanese People's Congress, which had initially intended to field Samir Kneo on the Amal-Hezbollah list, withdrew from the race.

=== Candidates ===
Ahead of the 2018 Lebanese general election, nine candidate lists were registered in Beirut II. This was highest number of lists registered in any constituency in this election.

List	Sunni, 6 seats						Shia, 2 seats		Druze, 1 seat	Greek Orthodox, 1 seat	Evangelical, 1 seat
"Future for Beirut"	Saad Hariri; 20,751 (14.43) (Future)	Tamam Salam; 9,599 (6.67%) (Future)	Nohad Machnouk; 6,411 (4.46%) (Future)	Roula Tabash Jaroudi; 6,637 (4.61%) (Future)	Rabea Hassouna (Future)	Zaher Eido (Future)	Ali Al Shaer (Future)	Ghazi Yusuf (Future)	Faisal Al Sayegh; 1,902 (1.32%) (PSP)	Nazih Najem; 2,351 (1.63) (Future)	Bassam Chab (Future)
"Beiruti Opposition"	Ziad Itani	Akram Sinno	Amer Iskandarani	Safiyah Zaza	Yassine Kadado		Lina Hamdan		Zeina Mansour	Bchara Khairallah	
"Unity of Beirut"	Adnan Trabelsi; 13,018 (9.05) (Al-Ahbash)	Omar Ghandour (Islamic Action Front)	Mohammed Baasiri				Amin Shri; 22,961 (15.96%) (Hezbollah)	Mohammad Khawaja; 7,834 (5.45%) (Amal)			Edgar Trabelsi; 1,919 (1.33%) (FPM)
"Lebnan Herzen"	Fouad Makhzoumi; 11,356 (7.89) (NDP)	Marouf Itani	Rana Chemaitelly	Mahmoud Kareidiya	Saaduddin Hassan Khaled	Issam Barghout	Yousef Beydoun		Zeina Mounzer	Khalil Broummana	Nadim Costa
"Voice of the People"	Ibrahim Halabi (People's Movement)	Youssef Tabash (Mourabitoun)	Firas Manaimna	Hanan Osman	Roula Houry	Faten Zain	Naamat Badruddin		Hani Fayyad (SSNP (Intifada))	Omar Wakim (People's Movement)	Nabil Sebaaly
"Beirut al-Watan"	Salah Salaam	Moustafa Banbouk (Al-Waqie Movement)	Bashar Qowatli	Imad Hout (al-Jama'a al-Islamiah)	Saad Wazzan	Nabil Bader	Salwa Khalil	Ibrahim Chamseddine	Saeed Halabi	George Chaqir	Dalal Rahbani
"Dignity of Beirut"	Khaled Hamoud	Mohammad Qadi	Jihad Matar	Hanan Sha'ar	Khuloud Wattar	Muhammad Shatila	Ali Sbeiti		Raja Zuhairi	Mikhael Mikhael	
"Birutah al-Mustaqilin"	Walid Shatila	Abdul Karim Itani	Abdul Rahman Gilani	Khalid Hanqir	Khalid Mumtaz		Wisam Akush	Jihad Hammoud	Andera Zouheiri	Leon Sioufi	Fadi Zarazir
"We are All Beirut"	Ibrahim Mneimneh	Hassan Faysal Sano	Nadine Itani	Marwan Tibi	Fatima Moshref (Sabaa)		Naji Kodeih			Zeina Majdalani	Nihad Yazbek
Source: Al-Modon, ACE Project, Ministry of Interior and Municipalities

=== Results by candidate ===
Name	Sect	List	Party	Votes	% of votes in electoral district	% of preferential votes for sect seat	% of list	Elected?
Amin Sherri	Shia	"Unity of Beirut"	Hezbollah	22,961	15.96	64.26	48.76	Yes
Saad Hariri	Sunni	"Future for Beirut"	Future	20,751	14.43	22.90	32.95	Yes
Adnan Trabelsi	Sunni	"Unity of Beirut"	Al-Ahbash	13,018	9.05	14.36	27.65	Yes
Fouad Makhzoumi	Sunni	"Lebnan Herzen"	National Dialogue Party	11,346	7.89	12.52	71.93	Yes
Tamam Salam	Sunni	"Future for Beirut"	Future	9,599	6.67	10.59	15.24	Yes
Mohammad Khawaja	Shia	"Unity of Beirut"	Amal	7,834	5.45	21.92	16.64	Yes
Rola Tabash	Sunni	"Future for Beirut"	Future	6,637	4.61	7.32	10.54	Yes
Nohad Machnouk	Sunni	"Future for Beirut"	Future	6,411	4.46	7.07	10.18	Yes
Rabea Hassouna	Sunni	"Future for Beirut"	Future	5,825	4.05	6.43	9.25	
Imad Hout	Sunni	"Beirut al-Watan"	al-Jama'a al-Islamiah	3,938	2.74	4.35	52.68	
Zaher Eido	Sunni	"Future for Beirut"	Future	2,510	1.75	2.77	3.99	
Ali Al Shaer	Shia	"Future for Beirut"	Future	2,462	1.71	6.89	3.91	
Nazih Najem	Greek Orthodox	"Future for Beirut"	Future	2,351	1.63	40.65	3.73	Yes
Edgar Trabelsi	Evangelical	"Unity of Beirut"	FPM	1,919	1.33	53.45	4.08	Yes
Faisal Al Sayegh	Druze	"Future for Beirut"	PSP	1,902	1.32	68.15	3.02	Yes
Ghazi Yusuf	Shia	"Future for Beirut"	Future	1,759	1.22	4.92	2.79	
Ibrahim Mneimneh	Sunni	"We are All Beirut"		1,676	1.17	1.85	27.15	
Khalil Broummana	Greek Orthodox	"Lebnan Herzen"		1,369	0.95	23.67	8.68	
Zeina Majdalani	Greek Orthodox	"We are All Beirut"		1,218	0.85	21.06	19.73	
Hassan Faysal Sano	Sunni	"We are All Beirut"		1,174	0.82	1.30	19.02	
Nabil Bader	Sunni	"Beirut al-Watan"		854	0.59	0.94	11.42	
Bassam Chab	Evangelical	"Future for Beirut"	Future	735	0.51	20.47	1.17	
Moustafa Banbouk	Sunni	"Beirut al-Watan"	Al-Waqie Movement	699	0.49	0.77	9.35	
Nihad Yazbek	Evangelical	"We are All Beirut"		633	0.44	17.63	10.25	
Marouf Itani	Sunni	"Lebnan Herzen"		632	0.44	0.70	4.01	
Nadine Itani	Sunni	"We are All Beirut"		612	0.43	0.68	9.91	
Saaduddin Hassan Khaled	Sunni	"Lebnan Herzen"		572	0.40	0.63	3.63	
Bashar Qowatli	Sunni	"Beirut al-Watan"		570	0.40	0.63	7.63	
Omar Wakim	Greek Orthodox	"Voice of the People"	People's Movement	476	0.33	8.23	35.55	
Fatima Moshref	Sunni	"We are All Beirut"		423	0.29	0.47	6.85	
Omar Ghandour	Sunni	"Unity of Beirut"	Islamic Action Front	329	0.23	0.36	0.70	
Saad Wazzan	Sunni	"Beirut al-Watan"		321	0.22	0.35	4.29	
Salah Salam	Sunni	"Beirut al-Watan"		308	0.21	0.34	4.12	
Saeed Halabi	Druze	"Beirut al-Watan"		295	0.21	10.57	3.95	
Ziad Itani	Sunni	"Beiruti Opposition"	Rifi Bloc	263	0.18	0.29	47.56	
Zeina Mounzer	Druze	"Lebnan Herzen"		237	0.16	8.49	1.50	
Muhammad Shatila	Sunni	"Dignity of Beirut"		227	0.16	0.25	23.38	
Raja Zuhairi	Druze	"Dignity of Beirut"		223	0.16	7.99	22.97	
Yousef Beydoun	Shia	"Lebnan Herzen"		221	0.15	0.62	1.40	
Mohammed Baasiri	Sunni	"Unity of Beirut"		205	0.14	0.23	0.44	
Ibrahim Halabi	Sunni	"Voice of the People"	People's Movement	195	0.14	0.22	14.56	
George Chaqir	Greek Orthodox	"Beirut al-Watan"		175	0.12	3.03	2.34	
Nadim Costa	Evangelical	"Lebnan Herzen"		169	0.12	4.71	1.07	
Rana Chemaitelly	Sunni	"Lebnan Herzen"		169	0.12	0.19	1.07	
Issam Barghout	Sunni	"Lebnan Herzen"		164	0.11	0.18	1.04	
Naamat Badruddin	Shia	"Voice of the People"		153	0.11	0.43	11.43	
Youssef Tabash	Sunni	"Voice of the People"	Mourabitoun	127	0.09	0.14	9.48	
Mikhael Mikhael	Greek Orthodox	"Dignity of Beirut"		123	0.09	2.13	12.67	
Marwan Tibi	Sunni	"We are All Beirut"		112	0.08	0.12	1.81	
Naji Kodeih	Shia	"We are All Beirut"		111	0.08	0.31	1.80	
Khalid Mumtaz	Sunni	"Birutah al-Mustaqilin"		108	0.08	0.12	26.34	
Hani Fayyad	Druze	"Voice of the People"	SSNP (Intifada)	90	0.06	3.22	6.72	
Khaled Hamoud	Sunni	"Dignity of Beirut"		90	0.06	0.10	9.27	
Abdel Karim Itani	Sunni	"Birutah al-Mustaqilin"		87	0.06	0.10	21.22	
Mohammad Qadi	Sunni	"Dignity of Beirut"		77	0.05	0.08	7.93	
Akram Sinno	Sunni	"Beiruti Opposition"	Rifi Bloc	72	0.05	0.08	13.02	
Dalal Rahbani	Evangelical	"Beirut al-Watan"		71	0.05	1.98	0.95	
Mahmoud Kareidiya	Sunni	"Lebnan Herzen"		62	0.04	0.07	0.39	
Ibrahim Chamseddine	Shia	"Beirut al-Watan"		61	0.04	0.17	0.82	
Lina Hamdan	Shia	"Beiruti Opposition"	Rifi Bloc	58	0.04	0.16	10.49	
Hanan Osman	Sunni	"Voice of the People"		57	0.04	0.06	4.26	
Roula Houry	Sunni	"Voice of the People"		54	0.04	0.06	4.03	
Ali Sbeiti	Shia	"Dignity of Beirut"		53	0.04	0.15	5.46	
Hanan Sha'ar	Sunni	"Dignity of Beirut"		52	0.04	0.06	5.36	
Jihad Matar	Sunni	"Dignity of Beirut"		52	0.04	0.06	5.36	
Nabil Sebaaly	Evangelical	"Voice of the People"		51	0.04	1.42	3.81	
Yassine Kadado	Sunni	"Beiruti Opposition"	Rifi Bloc	46	0.03	0.05	8.32	
Walid Shatila	Sunni	"Birutah al-Mustaqilin"		44	0.03	0.05	10.73	
Fares Manaimna	Sunni	"Voice of the People"		40	0.03	0.04	2.99	
Leon Sioufi	Greek Orthodox	"Birutah al-Mustaqilin"		37	0.03	0.64	9.02	
Bchara Khairallah	Greek Orthodox	"Beiruti Opposition"	Rifi Bloc	34	0.02	0.59	6.15	
Salwa Khalil	Shia	"Beirut al-Watan"		31	0.02	0.09	0.41	
Faten Zain	Sunni	"Voice of the People"		30	0.02	0.03	2.24	
Andera Zouheiri	Druze	"Birutah al-Mustaqilin"		29	0.02	1.04	7.07	
Amer Iskandarani	Sunni	"Beiruti Opposition"	Rifi Bloc	25	0.02	0.03	4.52	
Khuloud Wattar	Sunni	"Dignity of Beirut"		24	0.02	0.03	2.47	
Abdel Rahman Gilani	Sunni	"Birutah al-Mustaqilin"		20	0.01	0.02	4.88	
Jihad Hammoud	Shia	"Birutah al-Mustaqilin"		19	0.01	0.05	4.63	
Khalid Hanqir	Sunni	"Birutah al-Mustaqilin"		16	0.01	0.02	3.90	
Zeina Mansour	Druze	"Beiruti Opposition"	Rifi Bloc	15	0.01	0.54	2.71	
Fadi Zarazir	Evangelical	"Birutah al-Mustaqilin"		12	0.01	0.33	2.93	
Wisam Akush	Shia	"Birutah al-Mustaqilin"		9	0.01	0.03	2.20	
Safiyah Zaza	Sunni	"Beiruti Opposition"	Rifi Bloc	7	0.00	0.01	1.27	
