= Renewal Bloc =

Lebanese political bloc

Renewal Bloc كتلة تجدد
- Legislature(s): Parliament of Lebanon
- Foundation: 22 June 2022
- Member parties: Independence Movement; National Dialogue Party
- Constituency: North Lebanon: North II; North III; Beirut: Beirut II
- Representation: 3 / 128 (2%)
- Ideology: Sovereigntism
- Political position: Opposition
- Website: Official Website

Renewal Bloc (Arabic: كتلة تجدد) also known as Kutlat Tajadod is one of the parliamentary blocs in the Lebanese Parliament that was formed after the 2022 Lebanese general election. On 22 June 2022, MP Michel Moawad announced the birth of the bloc that would be consisted of 4 deputies.

On 8 January 2023, MP Ashraf Rifi clarified that the Renewal bloc doesn't have a president. In June 2024 Abdel Massih withdrew from the bloc citing political disagreements with the three other members.

== Election summary ==
| Election | Seats | Change |
|---|---|---|
| 2022 | 4 / 128 (3%) | New |

== 2022–2026 session deputies ==
| Name | Election Area | Political Affiliation | Sect |
|---|---|---|---|
| Michel Moawad | North 3 - Zgharta | IM | Maronite |
| Fouad Makhzoumi | Beirut II | NDP | Sunni |
| ~~Ashraf Rifi~~ | ~~North 2 - Tripoli~~ | ~~Sanad Movement~~ | ~~Sunni~~ |
| ~~Adib Abdelmassih~~ | ~~North 3 - Koura~~ | ~~Independent~~ | ~~Greek Orthodox~~ |

== Bloc allies ==
- Strong Republic
- Democratic Gathering
- Kataeb Party
