= Democratic Gathering =

Democratic Gathering can refer to:

- Democratic Gathering (Lebanon) - a political alliance in Lebanon led by the Progressive Socialist Party
- National Democratic Gathering - a banned opposition alliance in Syria
- Independent Democratic Gathering - a political party in Iraq that contested the December 2005 elections as part of the Iraqi National List coalition
