= Democratic Gathering (Lebanon) =

Parliamentary bloc in the Lebanese Parliament

Democratic Gathering (Arabic: اللقاء الديمقراطي) is the parliamentary bloc of the Progressive Socialist Party in the Lebanese Parliament. Headed by Taymour Jumblatt, it consisted of 9 deputies after the 2018 general election and 8 deputies after the 2022 general election.

== Election summary ==
Election	Seats	Change
1992	5 / 128 (4%)	Steady
1996	5 / 128 (4%)	Steady
2000	6 / 128 (5%)	▲1
2005	16 / 128 (13%)	▲10
2009	11 / 128 (9%)	▼5
2018	9 / 128 (7%)	▼2
2022	8 / 128 (6%)	▼1

== 2018–2022 session deputies ==
Name	Election Area	Political Affiliation	Sect
Faisal Al Sayegh	Beirut II	PSP	Druze
Hadi Aboul Hosn	Baabda	PSP	Druze
Akram Chehayeb	Aley	PSP	Druze
Henri Helou	Aley	PSP	Maronite Catholic
Taymur Jumblatt	Chouf	PSP	Druze
Marwan Hamade	Chouf	PSP	Druze
Bilal Abdallah	Chouf	PSP	Sunni Muslim
Nehme Tohme	Chouf	PSP	Melkite Greek Catholic
Wael Abou Faour	Rashaya	PSP	Druze

== 2022–2026 session deputies ==
Name	Election Area	Political Affiliation	Sect
Faisal Al Sayegh	Beirut II	PSP	Druze
Hadi Aboul Hosn	Baabda	PSP	Druze
Akram Chehayeb	Aley	PSP	Druze
Ragy El Saad	Aley	PSP	Maronite
Taymur Jumblatt	Chouf	PSP	Druze
Marwan Hamade	Chouf	PSP	Druze
Bilal Abdallah	Chouf	PSP	Sunni
Wael Abou Faour	Rashaya	PSP	Druze

== See also ==
- List of members of the 2018–2022 Lebanese Parliament
- List of members of the 2022–2026 Lebanese Parliament
