= Beirut II =

Electoral district in Beirut, Lebanon

- Constituency for the Parliament of Lebanon
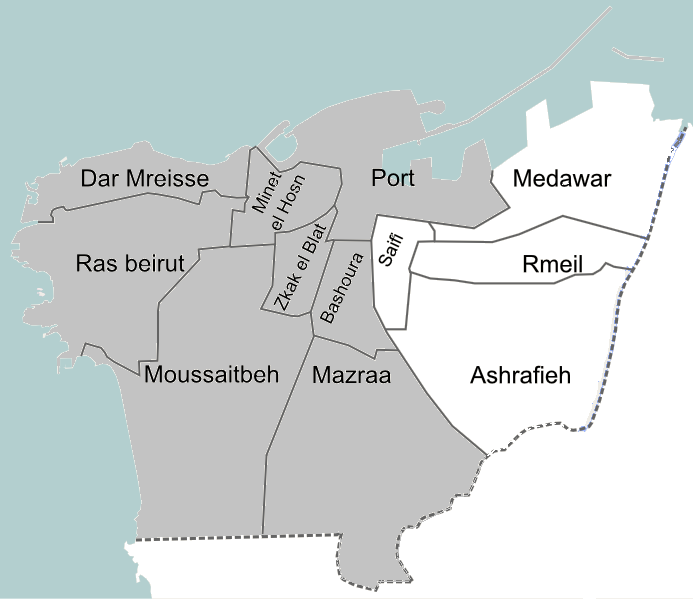
- Governorate: Beirut
- Electorate: 353,164 (2018)

Current constituency
- Created: 2017
- Number of members: 11 (6 Sunni, 2 Shia, 1 Druze, 1 Greek Orthodox, 1 Evangelical)

Beirut II (Arabic: دائرة بيروت الثانية) is an electoral district in Beirut, Lebanon, as per the 2017 vote law. The district elects 11 members of the Lebanese National Assembly - 6 Sunnis, 2 Shias, 1 Druze, 1 Greek Orthodox, 1 Evangelical.

The Beirut II electoral district covers 8 quartiers (neighbourhoods) of the Lebanese capital: Port, Bachoura, Dar El Mreisse, Mazraa, Minet El Hosn, Moussaitbeh, Ras Beirut and Zuqaq al-Blat. The electorate is predominantly Sunni (62.1%). 20.6% of the electorate is Shia, 5% Greek Orthodox, 3.41% Minorities, 1.86% Maronite, 1.65% Armenian Orthodox, 1.63% Greek Catholic, 1.55% Druze, 1.31% Jews (Note: Beirut II has the highest number of registered Jewish voters in Lebanon, constituting 1.31% of the electorate. However, these numbers don't reflect actual demographics following Jewish migration out of Lebanon, in 2009 election only 5 Jews cast their votes in western Beirut.), 0.81% Evangelical (Protestant) and 0.03% Alawite.

== 2018 election ==
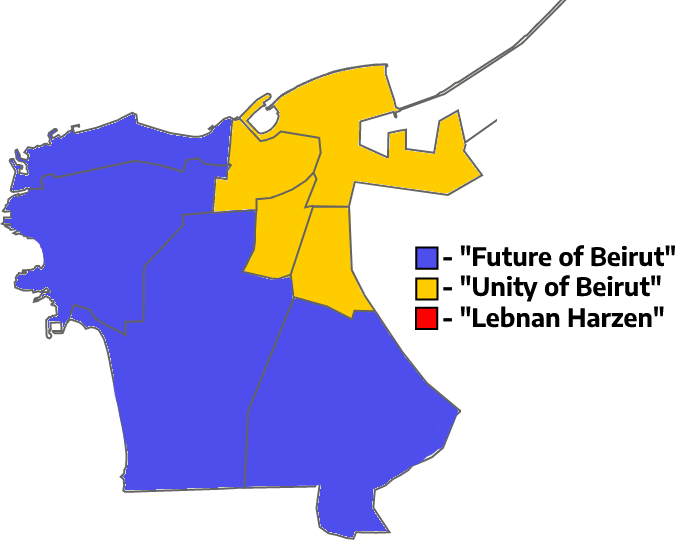
Results of the 2018 Lebanese general election in Beirut II by sub district

Ahead of the 2018 Lebanese general election, nine candidate lists were registered in Beirut II. This was highest number of lists registered in any constituency in this election.

In the 2009 election, the Future Movement had won the election in West Beirut. But this time, a number of lists seeks to challenge the Future dominance over the Sunni electorate, "Beirut al-Watan" (alliance of al-Jamaa al-Islamiah and Al Liwaa newspaper editor Salah Salam), "Beiruti Opposition" (fielded by Ashraf Rifi), "Lebnan Herzen", "We are All Beirut" and "Dignity of Beirut" (led by former judge Khaled Hammoud).

The erstwhile March 8 bloc split into two lists. Hezbollah, Amal, Al-Ahbash and the Free Patriotic Movement fielded the "Unity of Beirut" list, whilst the People's Movement and Al-Mourabitoun fielded the "Voice of the People" list. Omar Ghandour, candidate of the Islamic Action Front, prominent businessman and former president of the Nejmeh Sporting Club, was named president of "Unity of Beirut" list. The SSNP faction of Ali Haidar fielded a candidate on the "Voice of the People" list. Naamat Badruddin, also on the "Voice of the People" list was a leader during the 2015 trash protest movement.

Under the previous electoral law the Future Movement could easily win landslides in West Beirut. But under the new electoral law analysts argued that the Future Movement could lose a number of seats. Apart from the Hezbollah-Amal-FPM list (expected to win the Shia vote), the main perceived challengers to the Future Movement were the "Beirut al-Watan" list and the "Lebnan Herzen" list of prominent businessman Fouad Makhzoumi. Nevertheless, the Beirut al-Watan list included several figures close to the Hariri family and Salam pledged to support the "Sunni za'im" Hariri to remain Prime Minister of Lebanon.

Prior to the deadline to register lists, the Lebanese Democratic Party announced the withdrawal of its candidate for the Druze seat. Likewise the Lebanese People's Congress, which had initially intended to field Samir Kneo on the Amal-Hezbollah list, withdrew from the race.

=== Result by lists ===
List	Votes	%	Seats	Members elected	Parties
"Future for Beirut"	62,970	43.78	6	Hariri, Salam, Jaroudi, Machnouk, Najem, Al Sayegh	Future-PSP
"Unity of Beirut"	47,087	32.74	4	Sherri, Trabelsi, Khawaja, Trabelsi	Hezbollah-Amal-Al-Ahbash-FPM-ILF
"Lebnan Herzen"	15,773	10.97	1	Makhzoumi	
"Beirut al-Watan"	7,475	5.20	0		Salah Salam-JI
"We are All Beirut"	6,174	4.29	0		You Stink, Sabaa
"Voice of the People"	1,339	0.93	0		Mourabitoun-People's Movement-SSNP (Intifada)
"Dignity of Beirut"	971	0.68	0		
"Beiruti Opposition"	553	0.38	0		Rifi
"Birutah al-Mustaqilin"	410	0.29	0		
