= Fouad Makhzoumi =

Lebanese billionaire and politician

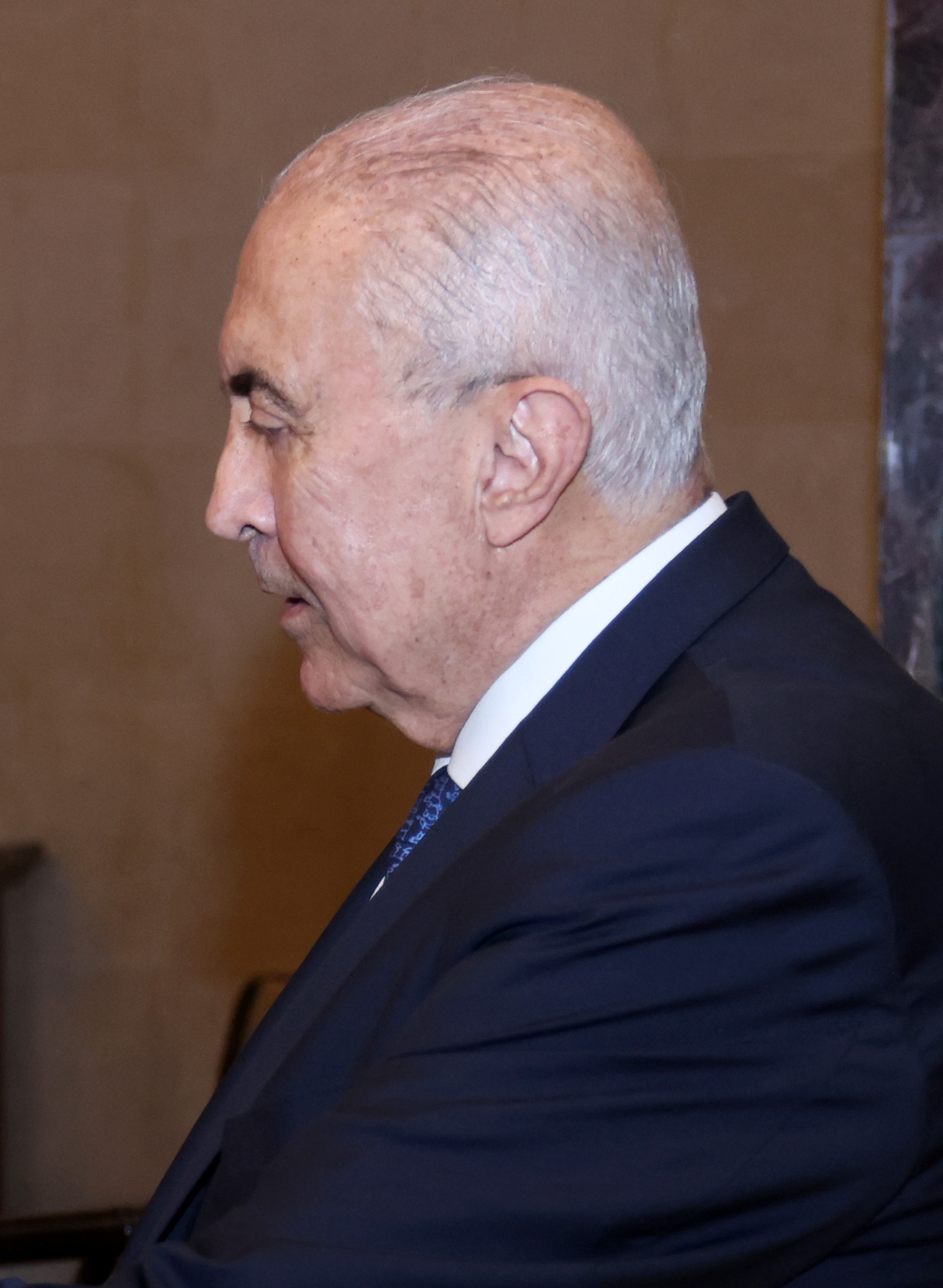
- Makhzoumi in 2024
- Born: 1952 (age 73–74); Beirut, Lebanon
- Education: Michigan Technological University
- Occupations: businessman, Lebanese MP
- Title: CEO, Future Pipe Industries
- Political party: National Dialogue Party
- Other political affiliations: Renewal Bloc
- Spouse: May Makhzoumi
- Children: 3

Fouad Makhzoumi (Arabic: فؤاد مخزومي; born 1952) is a Lebanese billionaire, businessman and politician, founder of the National Dialogue Party and member of the Renewal Bloc in the Lebanese Parliament.

He is a member of The Trilateral Commission.

== Early life ==
Makhzoumi was born in Beirut, Lebanon in 1952. He has bachelor's and master's degrees in chemical engineering from Michigan Technological University.

== Career ==
In 1984, Makhzoumi co-founded Future Pipe Industries, and was CEO from 1986 to 2003, when his son, Rami, took over as CEO, with Makhzoumi as chairman until 2011, when he resumed the CEO role.

In 2018 and 2022 he was elected to the Lebanese Parliament (Beirut II district, Sunni seat).

In his role as an MP, Makhzoumi expressed support for Lebanon to make peace with Israel and join the Abraham Accords once Hezbollah is disarmed and cannot launch attacks against Israel from Lebanon.

== Political donations ==
In 2010, the British Conservative Party received a donation of £300,000 from his wife, May Makhzoumi. In 2013, it was reported that May had given the Conservative Party another £500,000 earlier that year, bringing her total donations since 2010 to over £1 million.

In 2017, it was reported by The Guardian that François Fillon, the French presidential candidate, had allegedly been paid $50,000 to arrange a meeting between Makhzoumi, the Russian President Vladimir Putin, and Patrick Pouyane, the chief executive of the French energy multinational Total.

== Personal life ==
Makhzoumi and his wife May have three children, Rami (died 2011, brain aneurysm), Tamara, and Camellia.

May Makhzoumi lives in Kensington, London.
