= Future Pipe Industries =

Composite piping solutions company

- Industry: Manufacturing
- Founded: 1984
- Headquarters: Dubai, United Arab Emirates
- Key people: Fouad Makhzoumi (CEO) (Chairman)
- Products: Pipes
- Number of employees: 3,290

Future Pipe Industries is a Dubai-headquartered fiberglass pipe system design and manufacturing company active in the oil and gas, water, desalination, and industrial sectors.

FPI was founded in Dubai in 1984, has 12 factories worldwide, and employs 3,300 people.

In 2008, FPI planned to float 35% of the company on the Dubai stock exchange, DIFX for about US$550 million, valuing the company at $1.2 to 1.6 billion. This float failed to occur at that time.

In 2012, it was reported that around 2000, the annual turnover was about $100 million, but had grown to $1 billion, and that FPI accounts for 80% of the Makhzoumi family-owned Future Group, which might be floated in 3-5 years at a possible valuation of $4-5 billion.

Fouad Makhzoumi is the executive chairman, CEO and owner; his wife, May Makhzoumi, is the vice-chairman.
