= Amin Sherri =

Lebanese politician

Amin Sherri (Arabic: أمين شري) is a Lebanese Shia politician. He was elected to a parliament in the 2005 Lebanese general election, being fielded as a candidate by Hezbollah.

Hezbollah withdrew Sherri's candidature for the Shia seat in the Beirut II electoral district in the 2009 Lebanese general election, in favour of Amal Movement candidate Hani Kobeissy.

Amin Sherri is a financier of terrorism according to the United States government. He was accused of threatening the families of bank workers in Lebanon when banks decided to freeze the account of a member of Hezbollah. The US released a picture of Sherri with Qasem Soleimani.

He is married to Hoda Safa and has four children. He oversaw Hezbollah's religious and education activities. He was president of Al-Ahed Sports Club. He has been on several committees including education, trade, planning and production Lebanon committees.

== See also ==
- Funding of Hezbollah
- Terrorism financing
