= 2018 Lebanese general election =

- 6 May 2018

All 128 seats to the Parliament of Lebanon 65 seats needed for a majority
- Turnout: 49.68% ▼5.52%
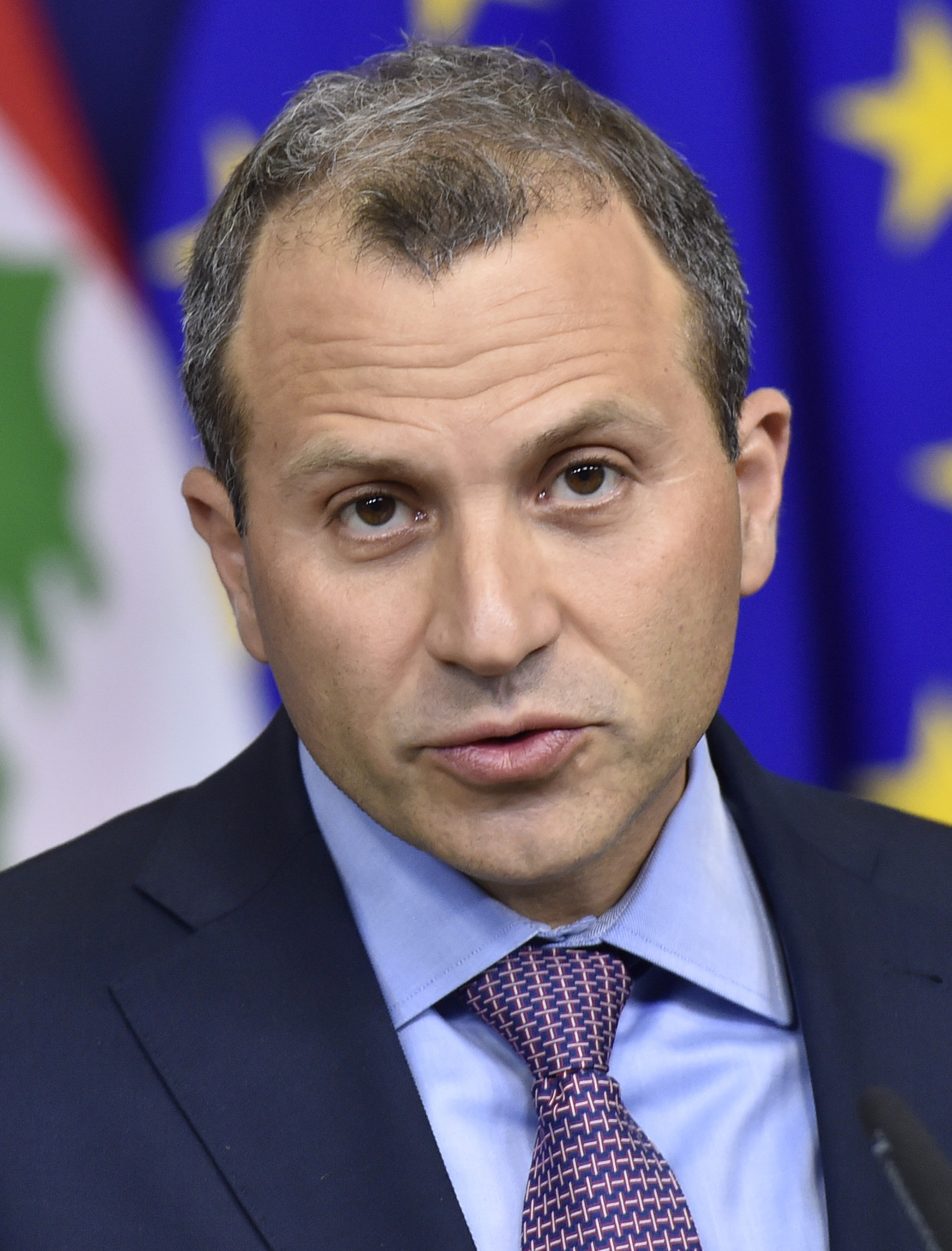

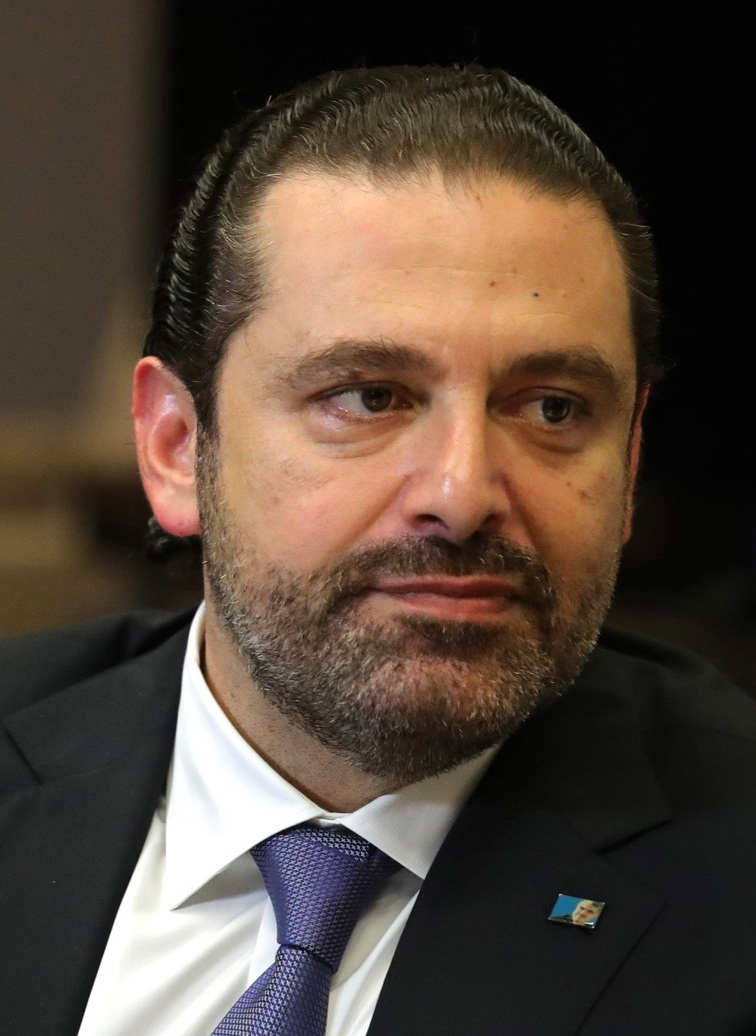

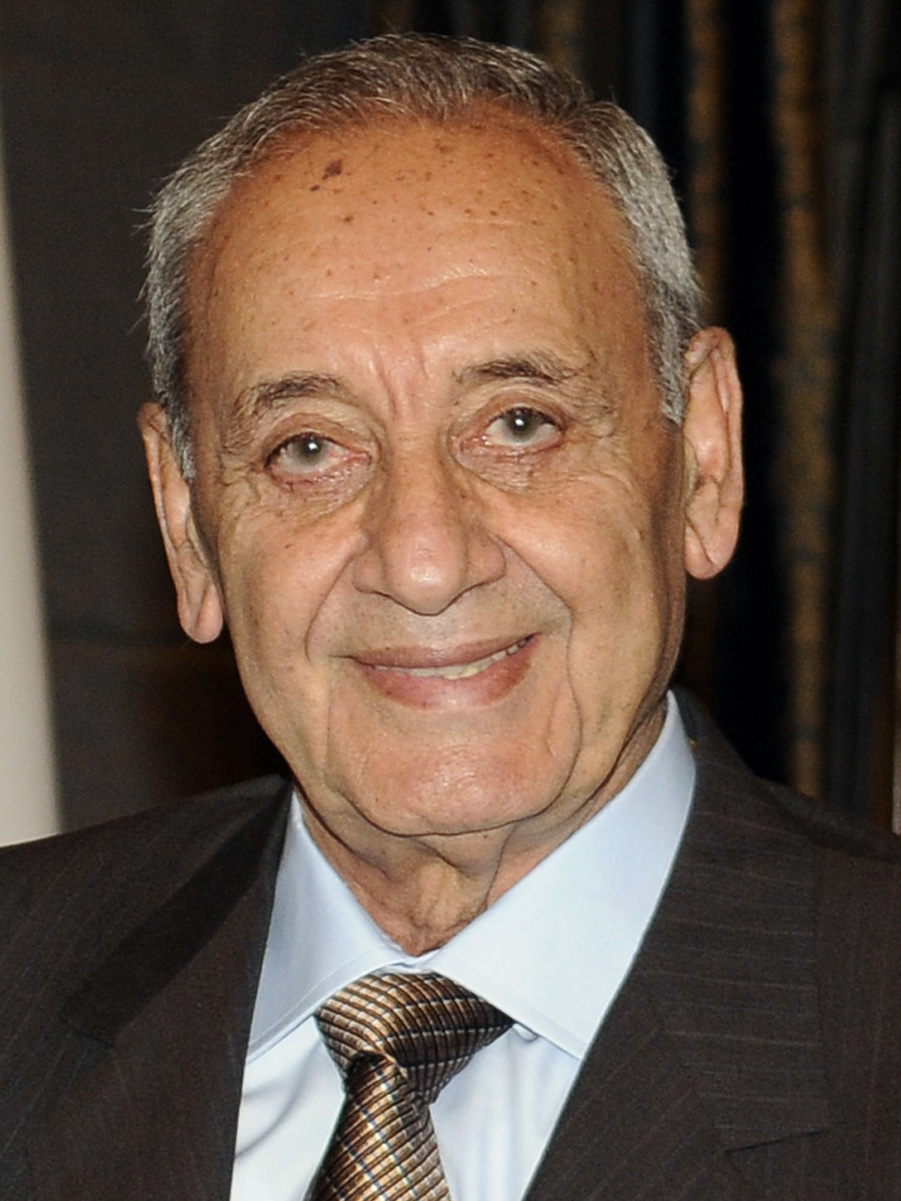

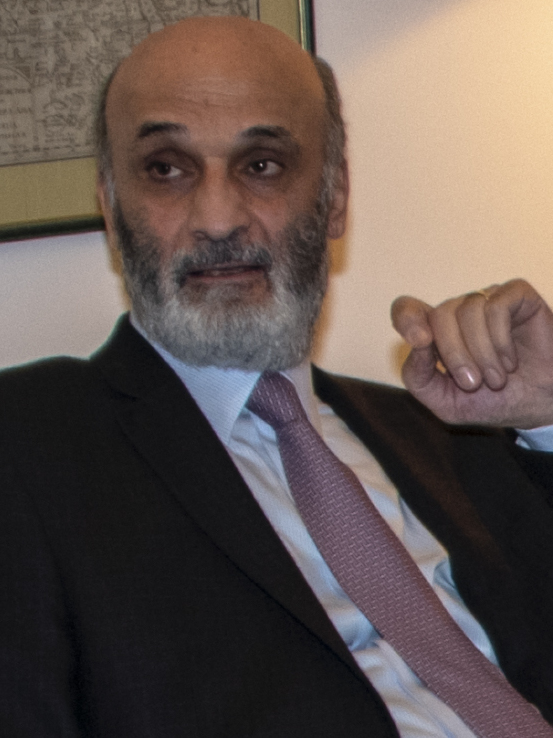

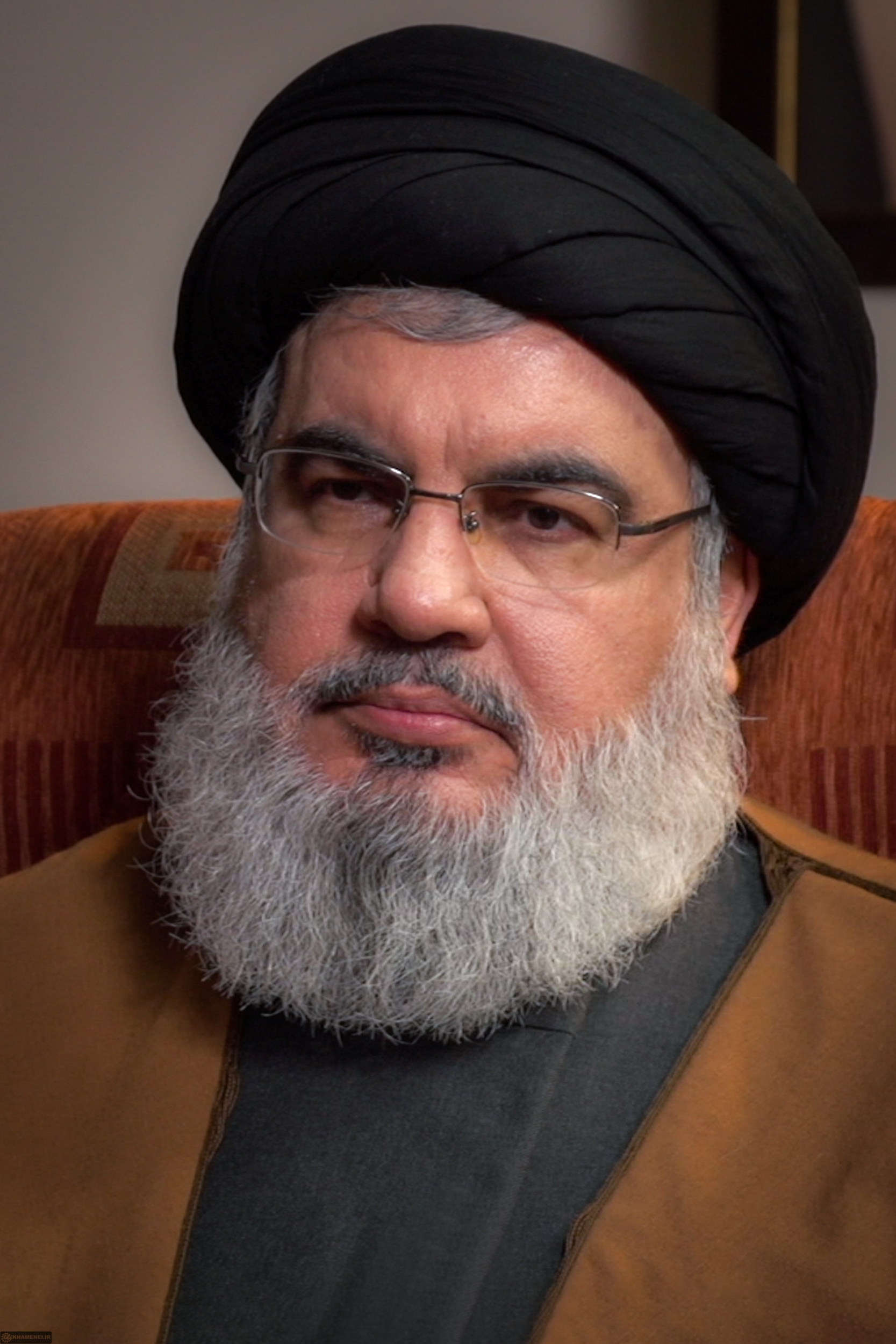

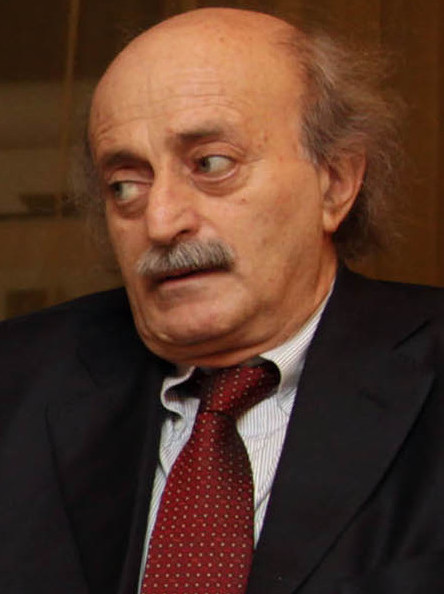

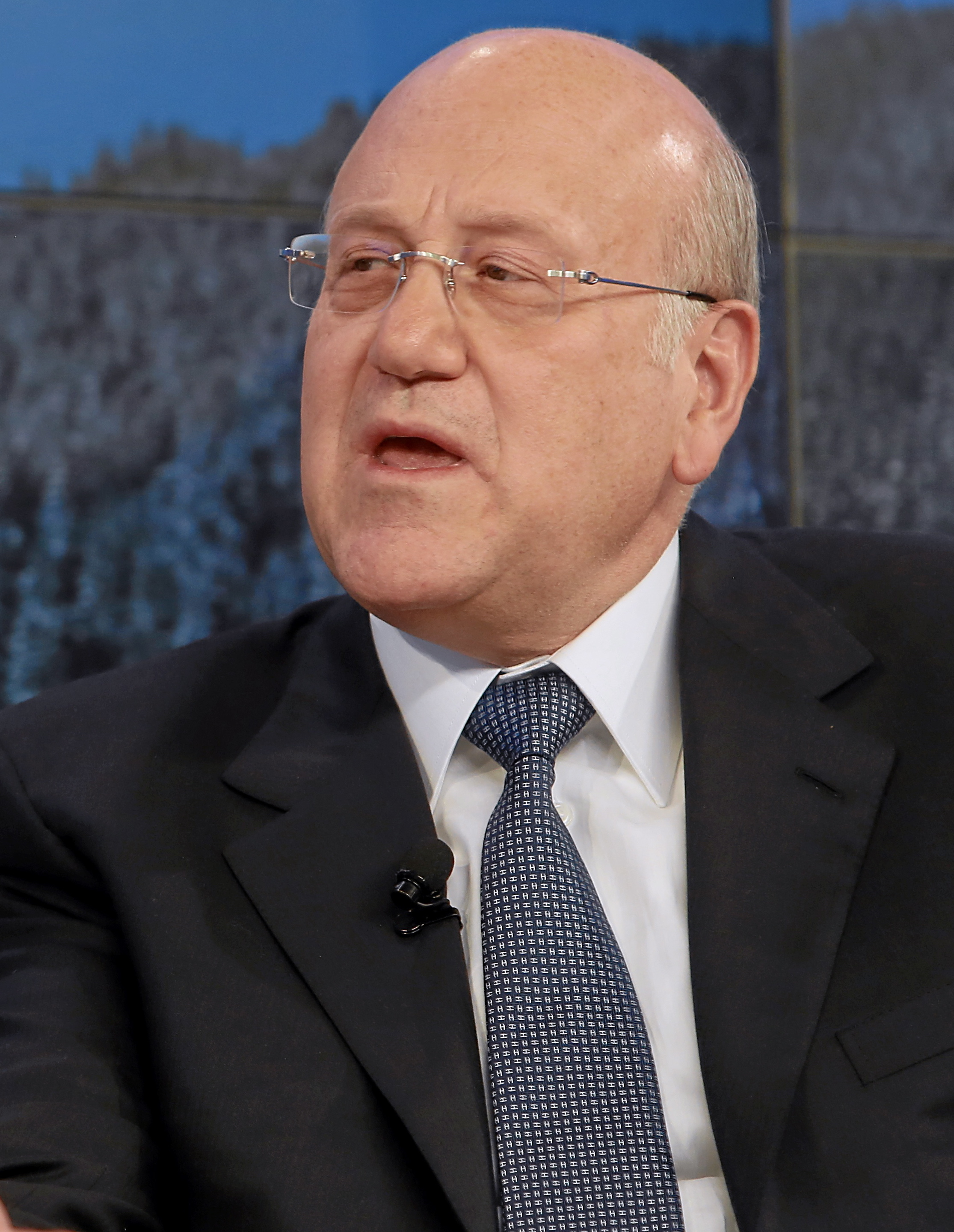

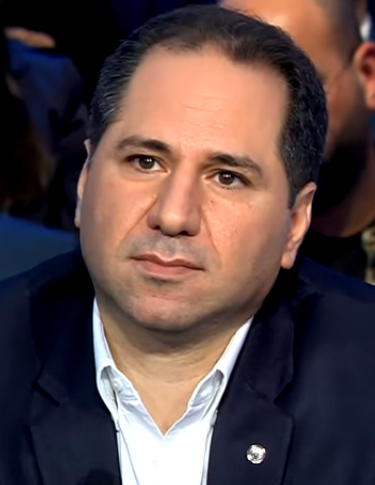

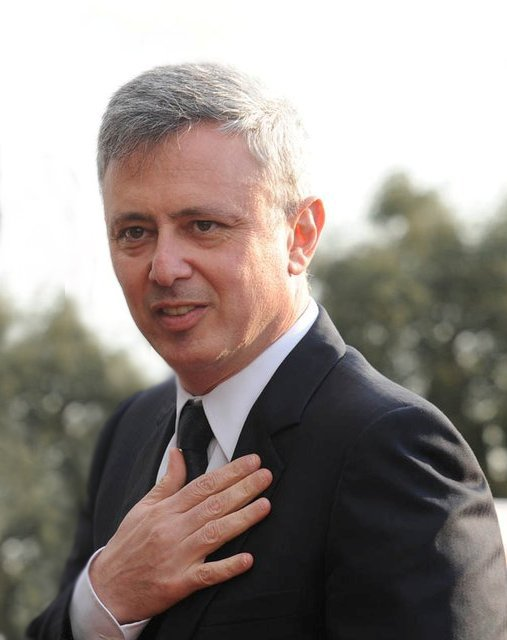
	First party	Second party	Third party
Leader	Gebran Bassil	Saad Hariri	Nabih Berri
Party	FPM	Future Movement	Amal Movement
Alliance	Parties: FPM; Tashnag; LDP; IM; Independents
Leader's seat	Batroun	Beirut II	Zahrani
Last election	19	33	14
Seats won	29	20	17
Seat change	▲10	▼13	▲3
Popular vote	272,605	256,454	210,211
Percentage	15.49%	14.58%	11.95%
	Fourth party	Fifth party	Sixth party
Leader	Samir Geagea	Hassan Nasrallah	Walid Jumblatt
Party	Lebanese Forces	Hezbollah	PSP
Leader's seat	Did not stand	Did not stand	Did not stand
Last election	8	13	11
Seats won	15	12	9
Seat change	▲7	▼1	▼2
Popular vote	168,960	289,174	80,894
Percentage	9.61%	16.44%	4.60%
	Seventh party	Eighth party	Ninth party
Leader	Najib Mikati	Samy Gemayel	Sleiman Frangieh
Party	Azm Movement	Kataeb	Marada Movement
Leader's seat	Tripoli	Metn	Did not stand
Last election	2	5	3
Seats won	4	3	3
Seat change	▲2	▼2	0
Popular vote	39,586	32,011	31,985
Percentage	2.25%	1.82%	1.82%
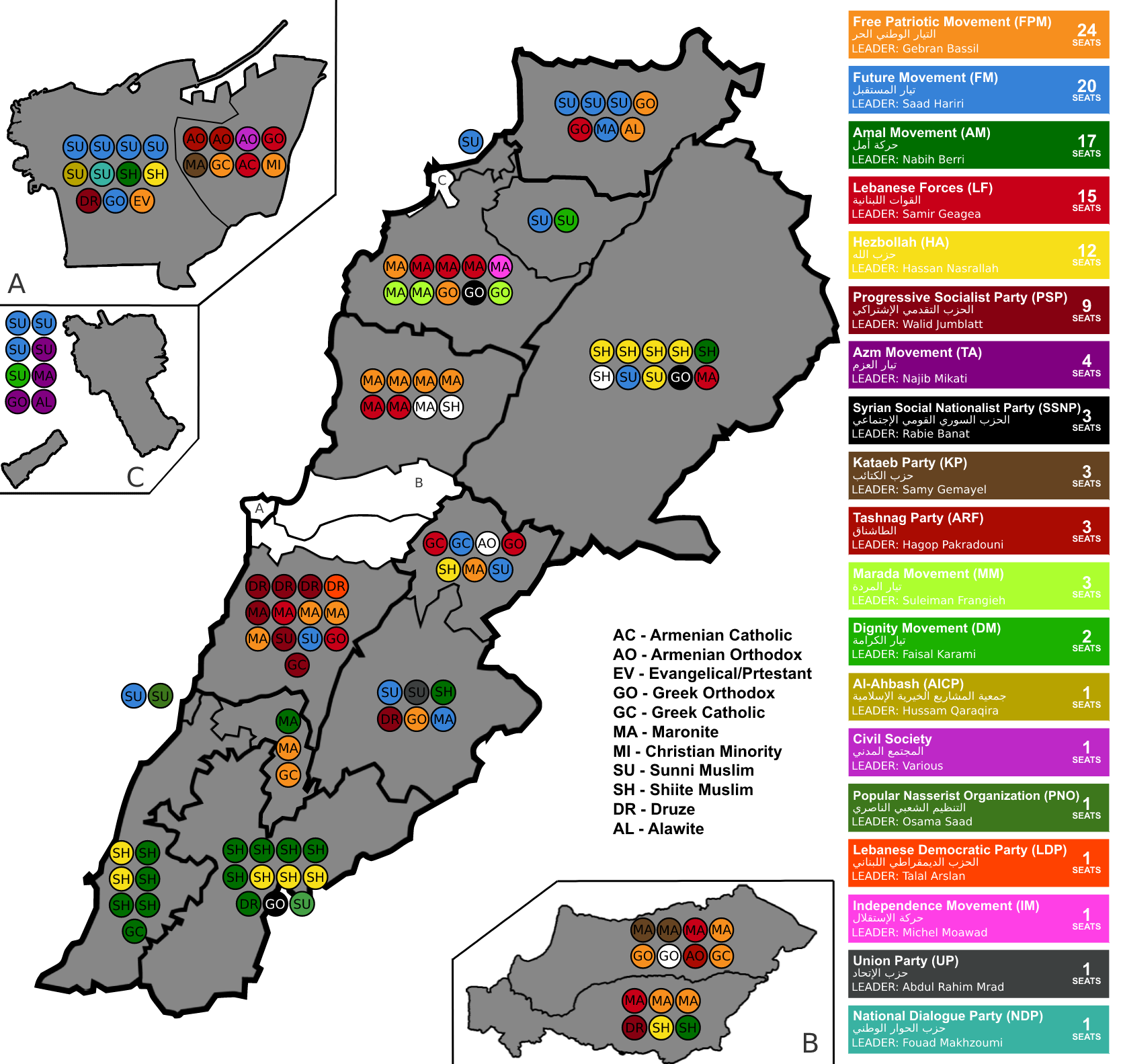
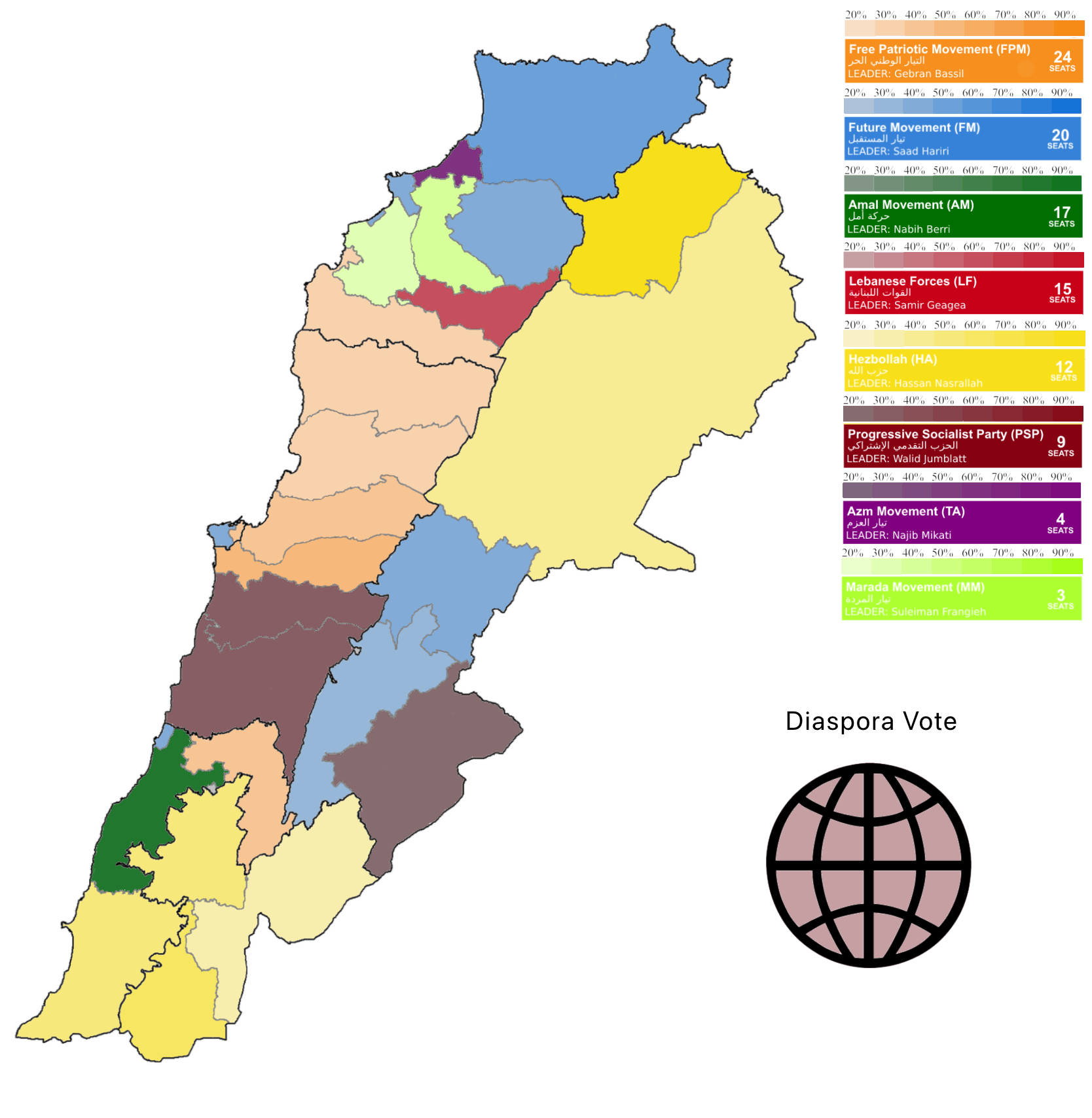
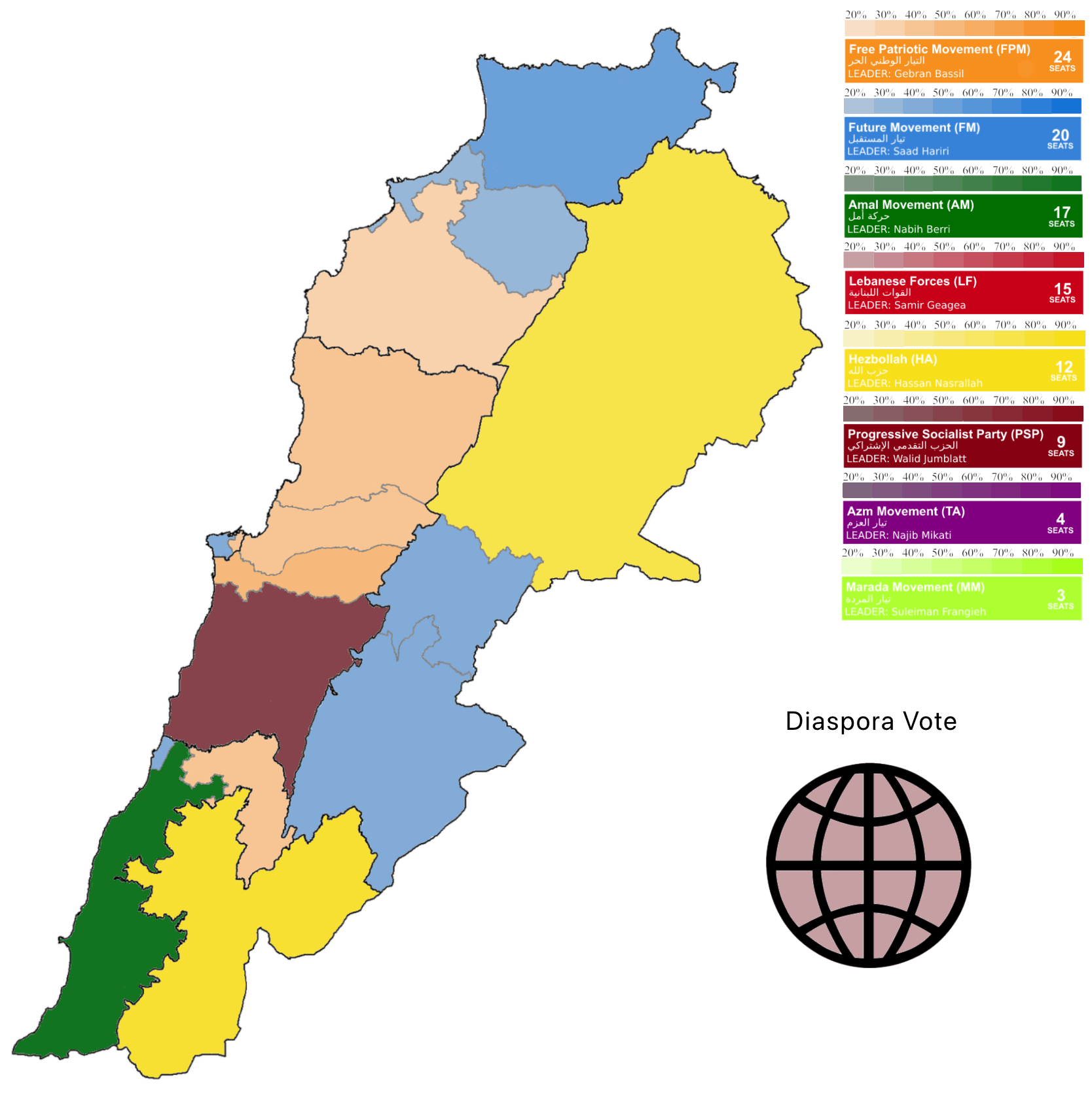
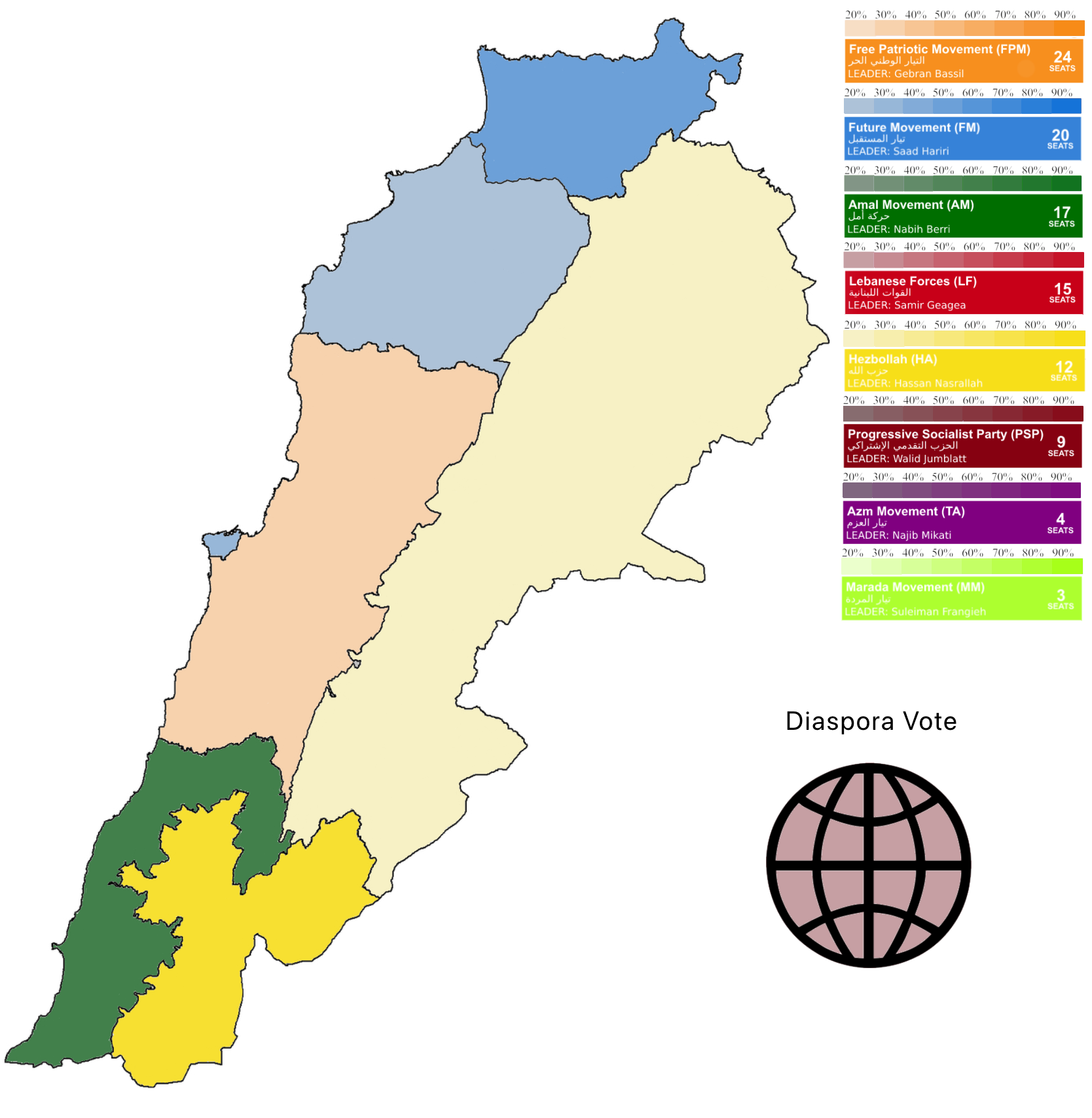
- Results by constituency
Prime Minister before election
Saad Hariri
Future Movement
Elected Prime Minister
Saad Hariri
Future Movement

General elections were held in Lebanon on 6 May 2018. Although originally scheduled for 2013, the election was postponed three times in 2013, 2014 and 2017 for various reasons, including the security situation, the failure of the Parliament to elect a new President, and the technical requirements of holding an election. A new electoral law adopted in 2017 provides a proportional representation system for the first time.

== Background ==
Following the last parliamentary election of 2009, it took several months to form a new government. Saad Hariri eventually became prime minister in a March 14 Alliance government formed in November 2009. About a year later, Walid Jumblatt's PSP broke away from the alliance and withdrew its ministers. Jumblatt then traveled to Syria for the first time in decades and met President Bashar al-Assad. After the government fell over the issue of the Special Tribunal for Lebanon, a new government was formed by Najib Mikati that consisted of March 8 Alliance parties, as well as the PSP.

Over the course of the Syrian civil war, fissures started to grow in Lebanon as 14 March parties supported the opposition in Syria while 8 March parties were ostensibly supportive of the Syrian government, particularly in the early stages. The 8 March parties therefore faced accusation from the opposition and its affiliated media of kowtowing to the Syrian government. As the Syrian conflict started to spill over into Lebanon, both via refugees and Lebanon's own diverse demographics that are broadly reflective of Syria's own diversity, tensions started to grow. A spate of sectarian kidnappings and threats followed, some of which turned fatal.

On 22 March 2013, Mikati resigned, citing a negative climate over the appointment of a committee to oversee the election and the Internal Security Forces (ISF) head Ashraf Rifi, who was expected to retire in April, continuing in the position. On 5 April, a new 14 March Alliance-backed consensus candidate for prime minister was announced, Tammam Salam.

== Postponement ==
A new president should have been elected by Parliament before the legislative elections took place. However, there was a deadlock which resulted in fourteen fruitless attempts to choose a head of state. Therefore, Parliament decided on 5 November 2014 to extend its term by 2 years and 7 months. The deadlock was perceived to arise from failure to reach quorum due to the voluntary absence of members from the ex- 8 March alliance.

== Electoral system ==
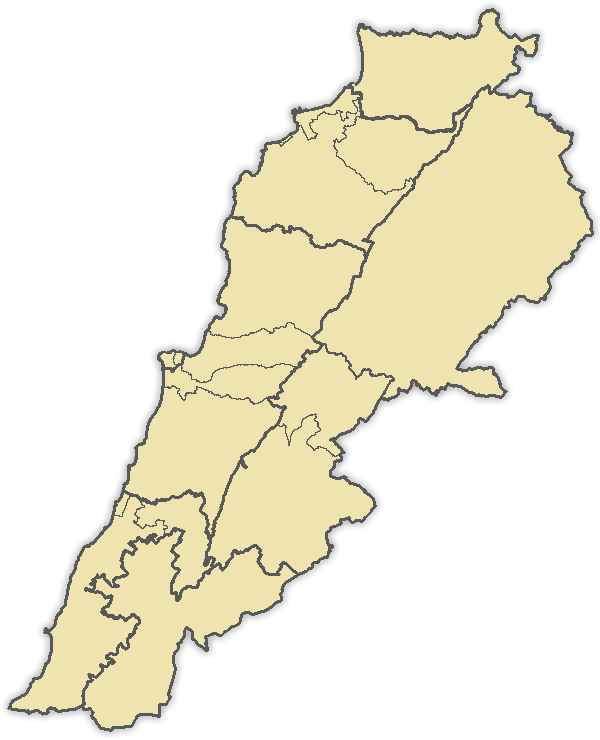
Electoral districts as per the 2017 vote law

In June 2017 a new electoral law was passed. The previous system (under which the 128 members of parliament were elected from 26 multi-member constituencies under multiple non-transferable vote, and the candidates with the highest number of votes within each religious community were elected) with a new electoral law instituting proportional representation in 15 multi-member constituencies while still maintaining the confessional distribution. However, the 7 out of the 15 of the electoral districts are divided into 2 or more 'minor districts' (largely corresponding to the smaller electoral districts from the old electoral law). Where applicable, preference vote is counted on the 'minor district' level.

Individuals could submit their candidacy for parliament until midnight of 6 March 2018. 976 candidates were registered, including 111 women. Candidates were obliged to join lists, which had to be finalized by 26 March 2018.

Electoral district under 2017 Election Law	Registered voters	Seats	Sunni	Shia	Druze	Alawite	Maronite	Greek Orthodox	Greek Catholic	Armenian Orthodox	Armenian Catholic	Evangelical	Minorities
Beirut I (East Beirut)	135,197	8					1	1	1	3	1		1
Beirut II (West Beirut)	346,260	11	6	2	1			1				1	
Bekaa I (Zahle)	174,944	7	1	1			1	1	2	1			
Bekaa II (West Bekaa-Rachaya)	143,653	6	2	1	1		1	1					
Bekaa III (Baalbek-Hermel)	309,342	10	2	6			1		1				
Mount Lebanon I (Byblos-Kesrwan)	176,818	8		1			7						
Mount Lebanon II (Metn)	179,789	8					4	2	1	1			
Mount Lebanon III (Baabda)	164,493	6		2	1		3						
Mount Lebanon IV (Aley-Chouf)	325,771	13	2		4		5	1	1				
North I (Akkar)	277,166	7	3			1	1	2					
North II (Tripoli-Minnieh-Dennieh)	343,290	11	8			1	1	1					
North III (Bcharre-Zghorta-Batroun-Koura)	246,977	10					7	3					
South I (Saida-Jezzine)	120,898	5	2				2		1				
South II (Zahrany-Tyre)	297,979	7		6					1				
South III (Marjaayoun-Nabatieh-Hasbaya-Bint Jbeil)	450,873	11	1	8	1			1					
Total	3,693,450	128	27	27	8	2	34	14	8	5	1	1	1
Source: Daily Star, Daily Star

Electoral district under 2008 Election Law	Electoral district under 2017 Election Law	Notes
Beirut I	Beirut I	The former Beirut II constituency was split between the former Beirut I and Beirut III (now renamed 'Beirut II') electoral districts. Medawar was moved into the new Beirut I electoral district, Port and Bachoura were moved into the new Beirut II electoral district. The 2 Armenian Orthodox seats from the old Beirut II electoral districts were allocated to the new Beirut I electoral district, the Sunni and Shia seats of the old Beirut II electoral district were allocated to the new Beirut II electoral district. Furthermore, the Minorities seat was moved from the old Beirut III electoral district to the new Beirut I electoral district.
Beirut II	abolished	
Beirut III	Beirut II	
Zahle	Bekaa I	no change
West Bekaa-Rachaya	Bekaa II	no change
Baalbek-Hermel	Bekaa III	no change
Byblos (Jbeil)	Mount Lebanon I	The old Byblos and Kesrwan electoral districts now constitute 2 minor districts in the new Mount Lebanon I electoral district.
Kesrwan	Mount Lebanon I	The old Byblos and Kesrwan electoral districts now constitute 2 minor districts in the new Mount Lebanon I electoral district.
Metn	Mount Lebanon II	no change
Baabda	Mount Lebanon III	no change
Aley	Mount Lebanon IV	The old Aley and Chouf electoral districts now constitute 2 minor districts in the new Mount Lebanon IV electoral district.
Chouf	Mount Lebanon IV	The old Aley and Chouf electoral districts now constitute 2 minor districts in the new Mount Lebanon IV electoral district.
Akkar	North I	no change
Minnieh-Dennieh	North II	The old Minnieh-Dennieh and Tripoli electoral districts have been merged, but subdivided into 3 minor districts: Tripoli, Minnieh and Dennieh.
Tripoli	North II	The old Minnieh-Dennieh and Tripoli electoral districts have been merged, but subdivided into 3 minor districts: Tripoli, Minnieh and Dennieh.
Batroun	North III	The old Batroun, Bcharre, Koura and Zgharta electoral districts now constitute 4 minor districts in the new North III electoral district.
Bcharre	North III	The old Batroun, Bcharre, Koura and Zgharta electoral districts now constitute 4 minor districts in the new North III electoral district.
Koura	North III	The old Batroun, Bcharre, Koura and Zgharta electoral districts now constitute 4 minor districts in the new North III electoral district.
Zgharta	North III	The old Batroun, Bcharre, Koura and Zgharta electoral districts now constitute 4 minor districts in the new North III electoral district.
Jezzine	South I	The old Saida and Jezzine electoral districts now constitute 2 minor districts in the new South I electoral district.
Saida	South I	The old Saida and Jezzine electoral districts now constitute 2 minor districts in the new South I electoral district.
Tyre	South II	The old Tyre and Zahrani electoral districts now constitute 2 minor districts in the new South II electoral district.
Zahrani	South II	The old Tyre and Zahrani electoral districts now constitute 2 minor districts in the new South II electoral district.
Bint Jbeil	South III	The old Bint Jbeil, Marjayoun-Hasbaya and Nabatieh electoral districts now constitute 3 minor districts in the new South III electoral district.
Marjayoun-Hasbaya	South III	The old Bint Jbeil, Marjayoun-Hasbaya and Nabatieh electoral districts now constitute 3 minor districts in the new South III electoral district.
Nabatieh	South III	The old Bint Jbeil, Marjayoun-Hasbaya and Nabatieh electoral districts now constitute 3 minor districts in the new South III electoral district.

== Electorate ==
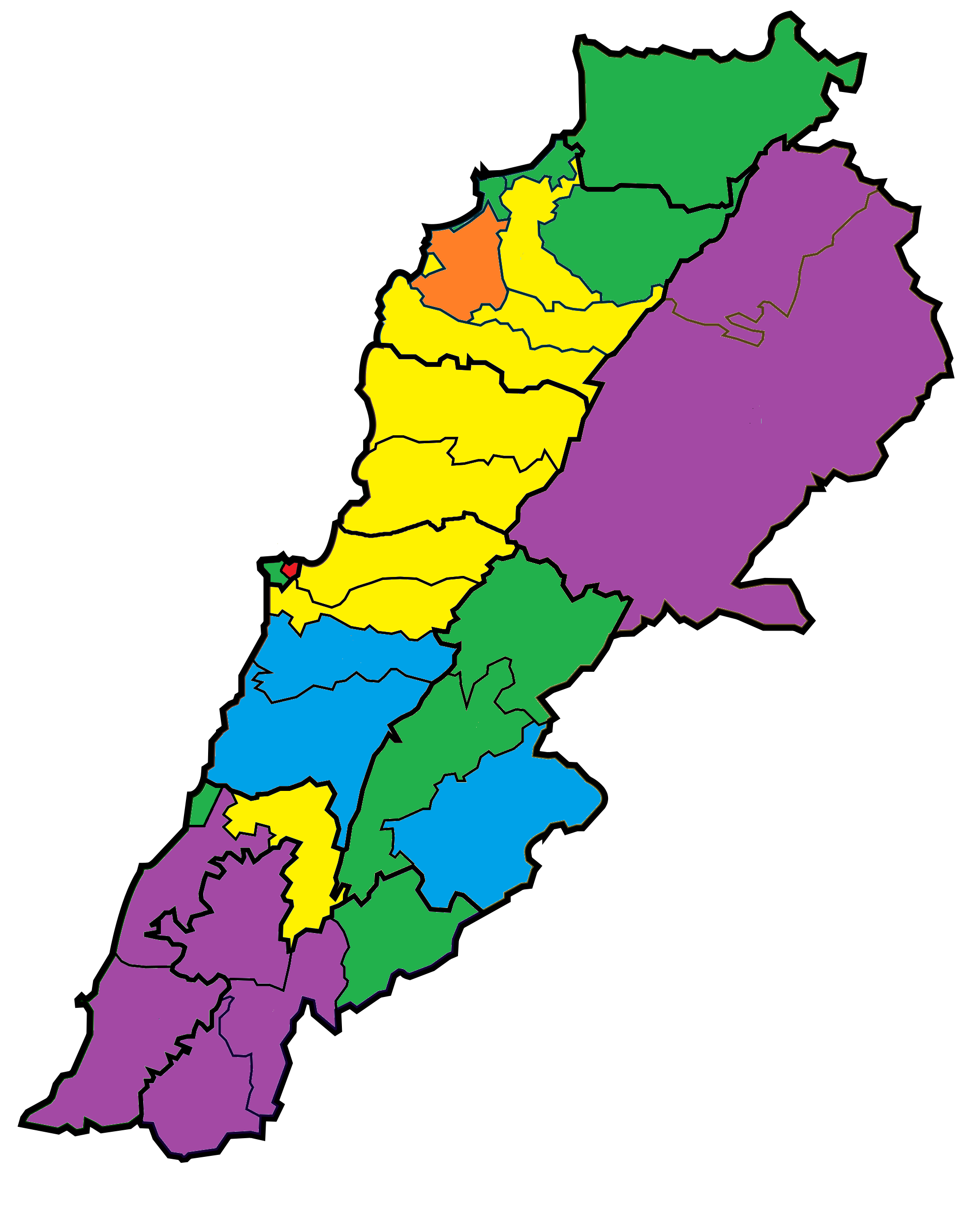
Listing the largest community in the Lebanese electorate, per qada and/or "minor district". Green = Sunni Purple = Shia Blue = Druze Yellow = Maronite Orange = Greek Orthodox Red = Armenian Orthodox

The Shia electorate constituted the majority of registered voters in Bekaa III, South II and South III, together accounting for 79% of the total Shia electorate.

The Sunni electorate constituted the majority of registered voters in three electoral districts (Beirut I, North I and North II); these three districts represent around two-thirds of the total Sunni electorate.

63% of all Druze voters were registered in the Mount Lebanon IV electoral district, which elected four out of the eight Druze parliamentarians. 97% of the Druze voters were registered in districts from which Druze parliamentarians were elected.

96% of Alawite voters were registered in either the North I or North II electoral districts, which elected one Alawite parliamentarian each.

Maronite Christians constituted the majority of voters in Mount Lebanon I and North III; these two districts represented 42% of the Maronite electorate.

North III also hosted the largest concentration of Greek Orthodox Christian voters (20.7%), representing around a fifth of all Greek Orthodox voters throughout the country. According to 2017 data, the Greek Orthodox constituted 58% of the voters in the Koura minor district of North III.

Bekaa I hosted the largest concentration of Greek Catholic voters, about a fifth of the nationwide Greek Catholic vote.

Beirut I hosted the largest concentrations of Armenians, both Armenian Orthodox and Armenian Catholic voters, who elected 4 out of the 6 Armenian parliamentarians.

The Minorities (Syriac Orthodox, Syriac Catholic, Latin Catholic, Chaldean Catholics, Assyrian Church and Copts) seat was now in Beirut I, which had the largest gathering of Minorities voters.

Jewish voters were mainly found in Beirut II, where they constituted 1.31% of the electorate. However, in the 2009 election only five Jews cast their votes in the Beirut III electoral district.

Below is a summary of the demographics of the Lebanese electorate with data from 2017, divided by the qada administrative districts (or in the case of Beirut, the old 2008 vote law electoral districts).

Qada	Electoral district (new law)	Sunni			Shia			Druze			Alawite			Maronite Catholic			Greek Orthodox			Greek Catholic			Armenian Orthodox			Armenian Catholic			Syriac Orthodox		Syriac Catholic		Other Minorities (Note: The Minorities quota includes six different Christian sects Syriac Orthodox, Syriac Catholic, Latin Catholics, Assyrians, Chaldean Catholics and Copts.)			Protestant Evangelical			Jews		"Others" (Note: Presumably consisting mainly of individuals whose sectarian affiliation has not been identified. In other accounts, people not belonging to any of the recognized sects constitute about a thousand voters.)		Total
Qada	Electoral district (new law)	No.	%	MPs	No.	%	MPs	No.	%	MPs	No.	%	MPs	No.	%	MPs	No.	%	MPs	No.	%	MPs	No.	%	MPs	No.	%	MPs	No.	%	No.	%	No.	%	MPs	No.	%	MPs	No.	%	No.	%	No.
Akkar	North I	186,541	67.30	3	3,289	1.19		16	0.01		13,711	4.95	1	30,617	11.05	1	37,541	13.54	2	3,414	1.23		174	0.06		67	0.02		151	0.05	52	0.02	264	0.10		809	0.29				520	0.19	277,166
Aley	Mount Lebanon IV	2,602	2.07		4,254	3.38		67,304	53.44	2	6	0.00		28,685	22.78	2	14,615	11.61	1	4,725	3.75		845	0.67		191	0.15		295	0.23	274	0.22	654	0.52		976	0.78		41	0.03	466	0.37	125,933
Baabda	Mount Lebanon III	10,867	6.61		40,470	24.60	2	28,359	17.24	1	19	0.01		56,467	34.33	3	12,704	7.72		8,753	5.32		1,600	0.97		761	0.46		727	0.44	636	0.39	1,740	1.06		697	0.42		2	0.00	691	0.42	164,493
Baalbek	Bekaa III	41,685	16.16	2	174,295	67.56	6	31	0.01		21	0.01		22,070	8.55	1	2,695	1.04		15,386	5.96	1	210	0.08		44	0.02		146	0.06	62	0.02	164	0.06		109	0.04				1,079	0.42	257,997
Batroun	North III	3,764	6.26		1,034	1.72		11	0.02		42	0.07		41,964	69.79	2	10,070	16.75		1,994	3.32		260	0.43		101	0.17		182	0.30	80	0.13	254	0.42		80	0.13		1	0.00	291	0.48	60,128
Bcharre	North III	109	0.22		27	0.05			0.00		6	0.01		46,512	94.64	2	1,380	2.81		554	1.13		81	0.16		26	0.05		87	0.18	34	0.07	107	0.22		55	0.11				170	0.35	49,148
Beirut I	Beirut I	7,214	7.78		2,401	2.59		316	0.34		32	0.03		17,541	18.92	1	22,014	23.74	1	11,776	12.70	1	14,610	15.76	3	3,991	4.30	1	1,445	1.56	3,441	3.71	4,766	5.14	1	2,186	2.36		49	0.05	939	1.01	92,721
Beirut II	Beirut I/Beirut II	34,982	32.19	(Note: The Sunni and Shia seats of the old Beirut II electoral district were transferred to the new Beirut II electoral district)	31,037	28.56		149	0.14		42	0.04		4,009	3.69		2,697	2.48		2,272	2.09		24,544	22.58	(Note: The 2 Armenian Orthodox seats of the old Beirut II electoral district were transferred to the new Beirut I electoral district)	3,151	2.90		333	0.31	871	0.80	1,726	1.59		1,970	1.81		397	0.37	506	0.47	108,686
Beirut III	Beirut II	180,600	64.49	6	44,722	15.97	2	4,839	1.73	1	87	0.03		7,114	2.54		14,953	5.34	1	5,702	2.04		4,613	1.65		1,008	0.36		4,667	1.67	1,423	0.51	2,118	0.76		2,720	0.97	1	4,056	1.45	1,428	0.51	280,050
Bint Jbeil	South III	2,024	1.38		127,571	87.09	3	16	0.01		10	0.01		12,596	8.60		314	0.21		3,128	2.14		70	0.05		45	0.03		53	0.04	16	0.01	111	0.08		76	0.05				444	0.30	146,474
Chouf	Mount Lebanon IV	58,223	29.14	2	5,984	2.99		62,238	31.14	2	10	0.01		54,401	27.22	3	3,179	1.59		12,666	6.34	1	246	0.12		155	0.08		308	0.15	175	0.09	487	0.24		761	0.38		12	0.01	993	0.50	199,838
Hasbaya	South III	23,414	49.34	1	1,381	2.91	2	15,342	32.33	1	2	0.00		1,966	4.14		3,698	7.79	1	1,040	2.19		32	0.07		23	0.05		31	0.07	12	0.03	47	0.10		297	0.63		1	0.00	165	0.35	47,451
Hermel	Bekaa III	1,678	3.27	(Note: The qada of Baalbek and Hermel form an electoral district together (Bekaa III), the seats are listed under "Baalbek")	48,820	95.08		5	0.01		91	0.18		609	1.19		14	0.03		19	0.04		4	0.01		2	0.00		1	0.00	7	0.01	8	0.02		5	0.01				82	0.16	51,345
Byblos	Mount Lebanon I	2,770	3.39		16,529	20.25	1	11	0.01		8	0.01		54,718	67.03	2	3,708	4.54		1,541	1.89		999	1.22		124	0.15		207	0.25	115	0.14	339	0.42		166	0.20				399	0.49	81,634
Jezzine	South I	1,443	2.44		12,413	20.96		578	0.98		6	0.01		33,443	56.47		1,487	2.51		8,597	14.52	1	145	0.24		89	0.15		208	0.35	116	0.20	288	0.49		165	0.28		1	0.00	243	0.41	59,222
Kesrwan	Mount Lebanon I	557	0.59		1,717	1.83		29	0.03		8	0.01		77,487	82.70	5	3,547	3.79		4,763	5.08		1,581	1.69		779	0.83		726	0.77	573	0.61	1,066	1.14		263	0.28		3	0.00	595	0.64	93,694
Koura	North III	8,626	14.32		1,202	1.99		11	0.02		478	0.79		12,991	21.56		35,335	58.64	3	713	1.18		99	0.16		30	0.05		67	0.11	32	0.05	187	0.31		233	0.39				254	0.42	60,258
Marjayoun	South III	4,303	3.83	(Note: The qada of Hasbaya and Marjayoun constitute a minor district within the South III electoral district under the 2017 vote law.)	90,771	80.85		1,001	0.89		5	0.00		5,557	4.95		6,138	5.47		2,908	2.59		69	0.06		31	0.03		51	0.05	27	0.02	341	0.30		899	0.80		1	0.00	165	0.15	112,267
Metn	Mount Lebanon II	3,791	2.12		5,387	3.02		2,361	1.32		186	0.10		78,154	43.78	4	26,258	14.71	2	17,831	9.99	1	25,330	14.19	1	6,343	3.55		3,708	2.08	1,483	0.83	4,054	2.27		2,719	1.52		22	0.01	903	0.51	178,530
Minnieh-Dennieh (Note: The Minnieh-Dennieh qada was split into two separate minor districts within the North II electoral district under the 2017 vote law.)	North II	101,971	85.93	3	312	0.26		3	0.00		74	0.06		7,449	6.28		8,171	6.89		176	0.15		16	0.01		6	0.01		17	0.01	7	0.01	37	0.03		42	0.04				390	0.33	118,671
Nabatieh	South III	3,142	2.17		135,407	93.59	3	18	0.01		21	0.01		4,031	2.79		239	0.17		1,074	0.74		15	0.01		18	0.01		20	0.01	10	0.01	95	0.07		52	0.04				539	0.37	144,681
Rachaya	Bekaa II	17,500	36.43	1	184	0.38		20,068	41.78	1				2,108	4.39	1	7,170	14.93	1	635	1.32		39	0.08		33	0.07		31	0.06	109	0.23	38	0.08		77	0.16				46	0.10	48,038
Saida	South I	50,900	82.53	2	6,672	10.82		38	0.06		4	0.01		1,323	2.15		303	0.49		1,578	2.56		215	0.35		31	0.05		25	0.04	22	0.04	139	0.23		155	0.25		1	0.00	270	0.44	61,676
Tripoli	North II	182,552	81.27	5	2,718	1.21		33	0.01		15,806	7.04	1	5,247	2.34	1	12,075	5.38	1	1,477	0.66		1,751	0.78		265	0.12		300	0.13	215	0.10	540	0.24		583	0.26		38	0.02	1,019	0.45	224,619
Tyre	South II	16,194	8.67		157,863	84.53	4	19	0.01		14	0.01		2,880	1.54		807	0.43		6,260	3.35		1,072	0.57		149	0.08		57	0.03	17	0.01	391	0.21		475	0.25				564	0.30	186,762
West Bekaa	Bekaa II	50,547	54.40	1	20,505	22.07	(Note: The West Bekaa and Rachaya qada form an electoral district together, the seats are listed under "Rachaya")	466	0.50					8,635	9.29		2,709	2.92		9,024	9.71		73	0.08		27	0.03		79	0.09	41	0.04	146	0.16		347	0.37		1	0.00	312	0.34	92,912
Zahle	Bekaa I	48,610	28.17	1	27,665	16.03	1	915	0.53		16	0.01		28,509	16.52	1	16,768	9.72	1	30,043	17.41	2	8,683	5.03	1	1,803	1.04		5,253	3.04	1,071	0.62	1,151	0.67		1,403	0.81		74	0.04	591	0.34	172,555
Zahrani	South II	4,538	4.08		80,990	72.82	2	49	0.04		5	0.00		11,607	10.44		767	0.69		11,963	10.76	1	100	0.09		49	0.04		88	0.08	38	0.03	167	0.15		482	0.43				374	0.34	111,217
Zgharta	North III	9,976	12.88		151	0.19		11	0.01		76	0.10		61,121	78.92	3	4,378	5.65		868	1.12		135	0.17		167	0.22		82	0.11	45	0.06	172	0.22		97	0.13				164	0.21	77,443
Total:		1,061,123	28.79	27	1,045,771	28.37	27	204,237	5.54	8	30,786	0.84	2	719,811	19.53	34	255,734	6.94	14	170,880	4.64	8	87,611	2.38	5	19,509	0.53	1	19,345	0.52	11,004	0.30	21,597	0.59	1	18,899	0.51	1	4,700	0.13	14,602	0.40	3,685,609
Source: Lebanon Files

== Parties ==
=== Amal ===
Amal Movement flag

Amal leader and Speaker of Parliament Nabih Berri held a press conference at his Ain al-Tineh residence on 19 February 2018, to present the electoral platform and the 16 candidates of the Amal Movement. Berri highlighted the ongoing oil exploration project, calling for setting up a national oil company and a sovereign oil fund. He reaffirmed the Amal Movement commitment to 'People, Army, Resistance' policy, urging steadfastness towards Israel.

The Amal-Hezbollah bloc fielded joint 'Hope and Loyalty' lists in the Bekaa III, South II and South III electoral districts. However, compared to the previous election, the Amal-Hezbollah bloc lacked an alliance with Michel Aoun and his Free Patriotic Movement. But whilst FPM and Amal had parted ways nationally, they still managed to form alliances in Mount Lebanon III and Beirut II. In Mount Lebanon III (Baabda) the joint list carried the label 'National Reconciliation'. In Beirut II a joint list of Amal, Hezbollah, FPM and Al-Ahbash was formed, under the label 'Unity of Beirut'. And whilst Berri and the Free Patriotic Movement leader Gebran Bassil had a public fall-out in early 2018, which sparked street riots, Berri's post as Speaker of the Parliament appeared to be fairly secured during the electoral campaign. Both the Hariri and Jumblatt camps affirmed their support to Berri's speakership in the run-up to the polls. According to political analysts, the Amal-Hezbollah victory seemed probably in Berri's home constituency, South II, as opposition forces had failed to produce a strong list to challenge him in his home turf.

In Bekaa II, Amal backed the 'Best Tomorrow' list.

=== Free Patriotic Movement ===
The electoral slogan of the party was 'A Strong [FPM] for a Strong Lebanon'. The party formed a number of local coalitions with a wide array alliance partners around the country. In North III FPM fielded the "Strong North" list, headed by Gebran Bassil, in alliance with the Independence Movement and the Future Movement. In Mount Lebanon I (Byblos-Kesrwan) FPM fielded the "Strong Lebanon" list led by Chamel Roukoz. In Mount Lebanon II (Metn) FPM fielded the "Strong Metn" list together with the SSNP and Tashnaq.

After the split between the Future Movement and the Lebanese Forces, a joint list for Beirut I of the Free Patriotic Movement, Tashnaq and the Hunchaks was conceived. supported by the Future Movement. In Bekaa I FPM, Future, Tashnaq and independents fielded a joint list. In North I (Akkar) and South II (Saida-Jezzine) FPM formed electoral alliances with al-Jamaat al-Islamiyya. In North II FPM fielded a list in alliance with Kamal Kheir.

Moreover, whilst FPM and the Amal-Hezbollah coalition parted ways nationally, joint lists were presented in Beirut II and in Mount Lebanon III (Baabda).

In Bekaa III (Baalbek-Hermel) FPM had hoped to form a list together with former speaker Hussein el-Husseini, but the project fell apart as el-Husseini withdrew from the electoral process. In the end, the Free Patriotic Movement candidates joined the list led by the former regional secretary of the Baath Party, Faiz Shukr.

In South III the Future Movement, the Free Patriotic Movement and the Lebanese Democratic Party supported a joint list called "The South is Worth It", with two FPM-supported independents.

=== Future Movement ===
At a ceremony in the Seaside Pavilion on 11 March 2018 the candidates and electoral platform of the Future Movement were presented. The party fielded 37 candidates, out of whom 21 were newcomers. The political newcomers included lawyer Roula Tabash Jaroudi in Beirut II and civil society activist Chadi Nacchabe in Tripoli.

The electoral slogan of the party was 'Blue Talisman' (kharzé zar’a). Commenting on the slogan party leader Saad Hariri stated that "[the] Future Movement is a Talisman (blue bead) that you put in the ballot box, to protect the country. For that reason, our slogan is the protection of Lebanon and the symbol is the Talisman. You will draw the Talisman with your activity, with your energy, with your daily small and large contributions to the electoral machine, in your dialogue with people, in working for each candidate on the Future lists."

The Future Movement and the Lebanese Forces negotiated for weeks on forming an electoral alliance, but the effort failed as relations between Future leader Saad Hariri and LF leader Samir Geagea deteriorated on issues relating to Hariri's visit to Saudi Arabia.

=== Hezbollah ===
On 19 February 2018, Hezbollah general secretary Hassan Nasrallah presented the names of the 13 Hezbollah candidates. Amongst the candidates there were five new faces.

On 22 March 2018, Nasrallah issued a statement outlining the main priorities for the parliamentary bloc of the party, Loyalty to the Resistance, in the next parliament. He stated that rooting out corruption would be the foremost priority of the Loyalty to the Resistance bloc. He described the relation with FPM as 'normal', whilst reaffirming the claim that opponents to the Amal-Hezbollah bloc in Bekaa III had supported 'terrorist groups'.

The electoral slogan of the party was 'We will construct and we will protect'.

Overall, Hezbollah performed the best in the case of popular vote in the election, and had substantial electoral vote gains as well.

=== Kataeb Party ===
Kataeb ran the elections based on an attempt to re-brand the party as a reformist political force, and distance it from its right-wing conservative legacy. The electoral slogan of the party was 'A Pulse for Change'. Its electoral platform was a comprehensive list of policies that included 131 points, including a range of long-demanded reforms. The party held the elections based on a discourse inspired by protest movements, and attempted to re-brand itself away. However, it failed to make any gains in the elections, losing two of its parliamentary seats and gaining only three seats, two of whom for party leader and Amine Gemayel's son Samy Gemayel, and Nadim Gemayel, son of late president-elect and Lebanese Forces leader Bashir Gemayel.

=== Lebanese Forces ===
The Lebanese Forces announced the names of 19 party candidates and 20 allies on LF-supported lists at an event in Beirut on 14 March 2018 (the anniversary of the founding of the March 14 Movement). At the event LF leader Samir Geagea affirmed commitment to the cause of the 14 March Movement.

The electoral slogan of the party for the election campaign was It has become necessary (sar badda).

=== Progressive Socialist Party ===
At the ceremony marking the 40th anniversary of killing of Progressive Socialist Party founder Kamal Jumblatt in Moukhtara on 19 February 2017, Walid Jumblatt symbolically gave his keffiyeh to his son Taymour, symbolically marking the generational shift in the party leadership.

The Democratic Gathering bloc, the parliamentary platform of the Progressive Socialist Party, fielded 9 candidates across the country. The number of candidates of the party was lower than in previous elections, in 2009 the bloc won 11 seats. For the first time since 1992 PSP chief Walid Jumblatt did not stand as a candidate, with Taymour taking over as the party leader. The party fielded candidates for 3 out of 4 Druze seats in Mount Lebanon IV, keeping with the tradition of leaving a seat uncontested to help LDP chief Talal Arslan get elected.

PSP joined joint lists with the Future Movement in Beirut II, Bekaa II and Mount Lebanon IV and with Lebanese Forces in Mount Lebanon III and Mount Lebanon IV.

=== Arab Democratic Party ===
In a statement issued on 29 April 2018 the Political Representative of the Arab Democratic Party Rifaat Eid called on his followers to vote for the Alawite candidates Hussein Saloum (on the list of Wajih Barini) in North I and Ahmed Omran in North II (on the list of Faisal Karami).

=== Arab Socialist Ba'ath Party ===
Prior to the election the Arab Socialist Baath Party had suffered a split, with Regional Secretary Assem Qanso and Numan Shalq heading in different directions. Both factions had nominated candidates for the elections, but none was accepted into a list and were thus eliminated from the polls. Reportedly, the Syrian ambassador had lobbied against any list accepting Qanso's candidates, as his group is not recognized from Damascus. A Baathist politician, Kassem Hachem, was included in a list in South III as Amal candidate, but not on behalf of the party. Former Regional Secretary Fayez Shukr headed a list in Bekaa III.

=== Lebanese Democratic Party ===
Talal Arslan's LDP gained only one seat in the new parliament, held by Erslan himself, as all other Druze seats were won by candidates from or supported by the Progressive Socialist Party. In Beirut II, LDP had hoped to get Nasib Jawari included as the Druze candidate on the Amal-Hezbollah, but Jawari was not included and LDP withdrew his candidature. Likewise LDP withdrew its candidate from the race in the Bekaa II electoral district.

=== Independence Movement ===
The Moawad family's Independence Movement joined the FPM list in Zgharta.

=== Kulluna Watani Alliance ===
The civil society alliance behind the "Kulluna Watani" (We are all Patriots) ('Kulluna Watani') lists held a launching event on 9 April 2018 at Forum of Beirut. The alliance gathered with a new Political Party ("Sabaa") and 10 different campaign and groups, most of which are connected to campaigns started in the protest movements of 2015 or the municipal elections of 2016. The alliance included in addition to Sabaa which is a nationwide secular Political Party few local political groups, namely Libaladi in Beirut 1 and Lihaqqi in Mount Lebanon 4. Speaking at inauguration event, Charbel Nahas, whose party Citizens within a State joined the Koullouna Watani lists at a later stage, said the purpose of the lists was to provide an alternative to the "corrupted" power in Lebanese politics. Koullouna Watani's electoral lists included 66 candidates running in 9 voting districts with one third of the candidates being from Sabaa. The nine lists were fielded in Beirut I, Bekaa I, all four electoral districts of Mount Lebanon, North II, North III and South III.

=== Ramgavar ===
The Armenian Democratic Liberal Party, or Ramgavar, issued a statement on 18 April 2018 condemning any candidate that opposed the unified Armenian parliamentary bloc. In Beirut I, Ramgavar candidates joined the list of Lebanese Forces, Kataeb and Michel Pharaon. One of its candidates is Dr. Avedis Dakassian, the Chair of the Lebanon Regional Committee of the party. In Metn, a Ramgavar candidate joined the list of Lebanese Forces.

=== Rifi Bloc ===
Ashraf Rifi, former Hariri ally, Internal Security Forces chief and Justice Minister, broke ranks with Hariri in 2016. In the 2016 Tripoli municipal election, he defeated Hariri's candidates and won 22 out of 24 seats. He fielded his own lists in the parliamentary election, in a move to challenge Hariri's dominance over Sunni politics. Ahead of the elections he profiled himself as a "hawk", unwilling to enter into talks with Hezbollah.

Rifi fielded lists in three electoral districts; Beirut II, North I and North II. Rifi tried to field a list in Bekaa I together with Kataeb and Lebanese Forces, but the initiative did not bear fruit. Likewise, Lebanese Forces and Rifi discussed a joint list in Bekaa III, but no such list materialized.

=== Syrian Social Nationalist Party ===
SSNP flag

The Syrian Social Nationalist Party in Lebanon fielded 7 candidates. In Mount Lebanon II (Metn) it joined the list of the Free Patriotic Movement. In Mount Lebanon IV (Aley-Chouf) it joined the list of Talal Arslan. In Bekaa I (Zahle) it joined the list of Nicolas Fattouch. In Bekaa III and South III SSNP candidates were included in the Amal-Hezbollah lists. In North I (Akkar) its candidate was included in the list of 8 March forces. In North III the SSNP entered the list of Boutros Harb and the Marada Movement.

=== Armenian Revolutionary Federation (Tashnag) ===
On 22 March 2018 the Armenian Revolutionary Federation, or Tashnag, announced its candidates in Beirut I and Mount Lebanon II (Metn). The party contested three seats in Beirut I and fielded incumbent parliamentarian Hagop Pakradounian in Metn. In Beirut I the party entered in alliance with FPM, Hunchaks and the Future Movement. In Metn the party entered in an alliance with FPM and SSNP.

In Bekaa I (Zahle) Tashnaq opted to support the candidature of Marie-Jeanne Bilezikjian, pharmacist and women's rights activist, on the joint FPM-Future list. The support for Bilezikjian's candidature was part of a wider agreement between Tashnaq and the Future Movement.

== Candidates ==
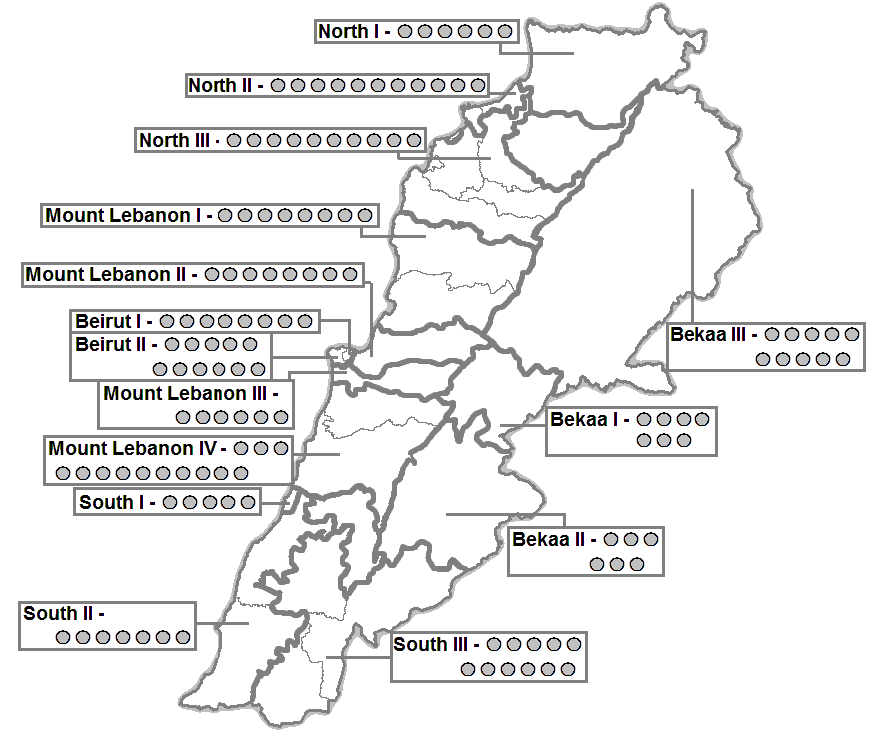
Distribution of seats between electoral districts

After the deadline on 26 March 2018, the Ministry of Interior and Municipalities announced that 77 lists, with a total of 583 candidates, had been registered. The highest number of lists was in Beirut II, where nine lists were registered. Only two lists were registered in the Zahrani-Tyre electoral district. Notably, the erstwhile 8 March and 14 March blocs, which had dominated the 2009 elections, are no longer functional and parties sought alliances on local dynamics when setting up lists.

A record number of Lebanese women running for office. In fact, out of the total 976 candidates who originally registered to run, 111 were female candidates – a staggering surge compared to just 12 women in 2009.

Seat	Seats	Candidates	Candidates per seat	Seat % of electorate in Electoral District
Alawite	2	12	6	
North I (Akkar)	1	4	4	4.97%
North II (Tripoli)	1	8	8	6.04%
Armenian Catholic	1	5	5	
Beirut I	1	5	5	5.57%
Armenian Orthodox	5	17	3.4	
Beirut I	3	10	3.3	28.3%
Bekaa I (Zahle)	1	4	4	4.99%
Mount Lebanon II (Metn)	1	3	3	14.3%
Druze	8	36	4.5	
Beirut II	1	7	7	1.55%
Bekaa II (West Bekaa-Rachaya)	1	2	2	14.8%
Mount Lebanon III (Baabda)	1	4	4	17.6%
Mount Lebanon IV (Aley)	2	8	4	40.5%
Mount Lebanon IV (Chouf)	2	10	5	40.5%
South III (Marjaayoun-Hasbaya)	1	5	5	3.65%
Evangelical	1	7	7	
Beirut II	1	7	7	0.81%
Greek Catholic	8	33	4.1	
Beirut I	1	4	4	9.8%
Bekaa I (Zahle)	2	8	4	28.3%
Bekaa III (Baalbek-Hermel)	1	5	5	5.36%
Mount Lebanon II (Metn)	1	5	5	9.83%
Mount Lebanon IV (Chouf)	1	5	5	5.18%
South I (Jezzine)	1	4	4	8.69%
South II (Zahrany)	1	2	2	6.81%
Greek Orthodox	14	65	4.6	
Beirut I	1	5	5	19.2%
Beirut II	1	7	7	5%
Bekaa I (Zahle)	1	5	5	9.54%
Bekaa II (West Bekaa-Rachaya)	1	3	3	7.16%
Mount Lebanon II (Metn)	2	8	4	14.6%
Mount Lebanon IV (Aley)	1	4	4	5.14%
North I (Akkar)	2	9	4.5	14.7%
North II (Tripoli)	1	7	7	6.24%
North III (Koura)	3	11	3.7	20.7%
South III (Marjaayoun-Hasbaya)	1	6	6	2.45%
Maronite	34	151	4.4	
Beirut I	1	5	5	13.2%
Bekaa I (Zahle)	1	5	5	15.7%
Bekaa II (West Bekaa-Rachaya)	1	3	3	7.22%
Bekaa III (Baalbek-Hermel)	1	5	5	7.35%
Mount Lebanon I (Byblos)	2	10	5	82.1%
Mount Lebanon I (Kesrwan)	5	23	4.6	82.1%
Mount Lebanon II (Metn)	4	19	4.8	44.8%
Mount Lebanon III (Baabda)	3	12	4	36.8%
Mount Lebanon IV (Aley)	2	9	4.5	27%
Mount Lebanon IV (Chouf)	3	16	5.3	27%
North I (Akkar)	1	6	6	10.9%
North II (Tripoli)	1	5	5	3.5%
North III (Batroun)	2	7	3.5	68.1%
North III (Bcharre)	2	8	4	68.1%
North III (Zgharta)	3	12	4	68.1%
South I (Jezzine)	2	6	3	30.8%
Minorities	1	5	5	
Beirut I	1	5	5	11.8%
Shia	27	102	3.8	
Beirut II	2	13	6.5	20.6%
Bekaa I (Zahle)	1	5	5	16%
Bekaa II (West Bekaa-Rachaya)	1	3	3	14.7%
Bekaa III (Baalbek-Hermel)	6	27	4.5	73.3%
Mount Lebanon I (Jbeil)	1	5	5	10.7%
Mount Lebanon III (Baabda)	2	7	3.5	25.2%
South II (Tyre)	4	8	2	81.4%
South II (Zahrany)	2	3	1.5	81.4%
South III (Bint Jbeil)	3	13	4.3	80.1%
South III (Marjaayoun-Hasbaya)	2	7	3.5	80.1%
South III (Nabatieh)	3	11	3.7	80.1%
Sunni	27	154	5.7	
Beirut II	6	47	7.8	62.1%
Bekaa I (Zahle)	1	5	5	18.7%
Bekaa II (West Bekaa-Rachaya)	2	5	2.5	48.8%
Bekaa III (Baalbek-Hermel)	2	10	5	13.3%
Mount Lebanon IV (Chouf)	2	11	5.5	18.7%
North I (Akkar)	3	18	6	67.5%
North II (Dennieh)	2	13	6.5	82.91%
North II (Minnieh)	1	7	7	82.91%
North II (Tripoli)	5	27	5.4	82.91%
South I (Saida)	2	7	3.5	44.2%
South III (Marjaayoun-Hasbaya)	1	4	4	6.35%

== International voting ==
During the elections 82,965 people registered to vote, 61.6% were males and 38.4% were females, however 46,799(56.4%) actually voted.

Country	Registered voters	Actual Voters
Asia and Australia
Australia	11,825	6,307
Kuwait	1,878	1,299
Oman	296	221
Qatar	1,832	1,385
Saudi Arabia	3,186	1,814
UAE	5,166	3,412
Africa
Benin	217	166
DRC	341	207
Egypt	257	131
Gabon	251	163
Ghana	375	237
Guinea-Bissau	439	265
Ivory Coast	2,345	1,625
Liberia	211	146
Nigeria	1,263	874
Senegal	400	269
Sierra Leone	260	126
South Africa	312	125
Europe
Armenia	311	140
Belgium	1,053	772
Denmark	250	139
France	8,730	5,034
Germany	8,355	4,489
Greece	256	145
Netherlands	228	119
Italy	729	389
Romania	270	191
Spain	376	113
Sweden	1,910	1,130
Switzerland	889	434
UK	1,824	5,223
North America
Canada	11,443	6,664
Guadeloupe	247	181
Mexico	351	122
USA	9,999	5,223
South America
Argentina	392	64
Brazil	2,112	287
Colombia	325	83
Paraguay	924	582
Venezuela	1,497	636
Total:	82,965	46,799

=== Diaspora results by party ===
The report found that the countries with the most voters registered in, those in North America, Australia, France, and the United Arab Emirates, mostly supported Lebanese Forces, Marada and FPM lists and candidates. Meanwhile, Amal and Hezbollah received the most votes in Germany and Africa. The report also found large support for the Future Movement in Saudi Arabia.

Source	Amal	FPM	Future	Hezbollah	Independent	LF	PSP	Other
Arab Reform	11%	16%	7%	9%	19%	19%	4%	16%

== Results ==
In a statement issued in the evening of 7 May, Interior Minister Nohad Machnouk promised to release full election result within 36–48 hours. In his statement, he announced "final, yet incomplete" official results, providing the names of elected parliamentarians from 14 out of 15 electoral districts. On 8 May, Machnouk announced the names of the victorious candidates from Akkar.

Following the announcement of results, the FPM leader Gebran Bassil stated that FPM would form the largest bloc in parliament (a role previously played by the Future Movement). Bassil stated that FPM would gather up to 30 MPs, including Talal Arslan, Tashnaqs and "businessmen".

=== Results by alliance and parties ===
Disclaimer: This listing uses a narrow definition of party votes, the preference votes cast for identified party candidates. For an overview of the voting percentages of the lists supported by different parties, see "Results by lists" table below.

Party	Candidates	Votes	%	Seats won	+/–
Hezbollah	13	289,174	16.44	12	▲1
Pro-Hezbollah Independents	11	9,612	0.55	0	▼2
Amal	10	165,556	9.41	10	▲1
Pro-Amal Independents (Note: Includes votes of elected candidates: Michel Moussa, Ibrahim Azar, Yassin Jaber, Fady Alameh, Anwar Khalil, Ali Assayran and Qassem Hachem)	7	44,655	2.54	7	▲2
March 8 Affiliates (Note: Includes votes of elected candidates: Jamil Al Sayyed, Elwalid Succariyeh and Eddy Demerjian)	4	40,545	2.30	3	▲3
Marada Movement	6	26,532	1.51	3	0
Pro-Marada Independents	3	5,453	0.31	0	0
Syrian Social Nationalist Party	7	23,435	1.33	3	▲1
Dignity Movement	2	7,620	0.43	1	▲1
Pro-Dignity Movement Independents (Note: Includes votes of elected candidate: Jihad Al Samad)	5	15,132	0.86	1	▲1
El Khazen Bloc	4	10,029	0.57	2	New
Al-Ahbash	3	18,759	1.07	1	▲1
Union Party	1	15,111	0.86	1	▲1
Popular Nasserist Organization	2	9,916	0.56	1	▲1
Arab Unification Party	2	7,493	0.43	0	0
Solidarity Party	1	3,861	0.22	0	▼1
Lebanese Arab Struggle Movement	1	2,041	0.12	0	0
People's Movement	2	671	0.04	0	0
Syrian Social Nationalist Party – Intifada Wing	2	536	0.03	0	0
Al-Mourabitoun	1	127	0.01	0	0
Amal-Hezbollah and allies	87	696,258	39.58	45	▲11
Free Patriotic Movement	32	143,287	8.15	18	▲6
Pro-FPM independents (Note: Pro-FPM independents includes elected candidates Elie Ferzli, Michel Daher, Mustapha Hussein, Neemat Fram, Chamel Roukoz and Farid Al Boustani)	25	93,655	5.32	6	▼1
Armenian Revolutionary Federation	4	13,726	0.78	3	▲1
Lebanese Democratic Party	5	13,257	0.75	1	▼1
Independence Movement	2	8,680	0.49	1	▲1
Free Patriotic Movement and allies	68	272,605	15.49	29	▲6
Future Movement	26	179,724	10.22	13	▼11
Pro-Future independents (Note: Comparison with 2009 March 14 independents. Pro-Future independents includes elected candidates Tamam Salam, Mohammad Sleiman, Walid El Baarini, Mohammad Keraawi, Henri Chadid, Dima Jamali and Nazih Najem)	19	76,730	4.36	7	▼2
Future Movement and allies	45	256,454	14.58	20	▼13
Lebanese Forces	17	128,712	7.32	12	▲4
Pro-LF independents (Note: Pro-LF independents include elected candidates Jean Talouzian, Ziad Hawat and Cesar Maalouf)	30	40,248	2.29	3	▲3
Lebanese Forces and allies	47	168,960	9.61	15	▲7
Sabaa Party	21	11,763	0.69	1	New
Citizens in a State	7	5,653	0.32	0	New
Lihaqqi	5	3,412	0.19	0	New
LiBaladi	5	2,345	0.13	0	New
Sah Group	2	1,613	0.09	0	New
Popular Observatory	1	1,308	0.07	0	New
Mouttahidoun United Group	2	1,009	0.06	0	New
Green Party	2	573	0.03	0	New
You Stink Movement	1	328	0.02	0	New
Idendity and Sovereignty Gathering	1	327	0.02	0	New
Civil Society Independents	43	16,215	0.92	0	New
Civil Society groups and parties	90	44,546	2.53	1	New
Progressive Socialist Party	9	80,894	4.60	9	▼2
Azm Movement	11	39,586	2.25	4	▲2
Kataeb Party	13	32,011	1.82	3	▼2
National Dialogue Party	10	14,941	0.85	1	New
Murr Bloc	4	12,866	0.73	1	▼1
Al-Jama'a Al-Islamiyya	4	14,419	0.82	0	▼1
Rifi Bloc	26	14,278	0.81	0	New
Lebanese Communist Party	10	10,793	0.61	0	0
Popular Bloc	7	10,563	0.60	0	0
National Liberal Party	6	4,054	0.23	0	▼1
Hunchak	1	1,566	0.09	0	▼2
Ramgavar	3	616	0.04	0	▼1
Lebanese Option Party	8	446	0.03	0	0
Democratic Left Movement	1	305	0.02	0	▼1
Socialist Arab Lebanon Vanguard Party	1	131	0.01	0	0
Independents	146	82,776	4.71	0	▼8
Others	260	320,245	18.21	18	▼16
Totals	597	1,759,068	100	128	
Blank votes		15,029			
Votes with no preferences		48,197			
Total votes		1,822,294			
Votes not counted		38,909			
Total Registered who voted/turnout		1,861,203	49.68		
Registered voters		3,746,483	100		

=== Results by lists ===
List	Electoral district	Votes	% nationwide	% of electoral district	Candidates	Members elected	Parties
"Hope and Loyalty" (South III)	South III	193,224	10.60	85.58	11	11	Amal-Hezbollah-SSNP
"Hope and Loyalty" (Bekaa III)	Bekaa III	140,747	7.72	75.24	10	8	Amal-Hezbollah-Solidarity-SSNP
"Hope and Loyalty" (South II)	South II	134,068	7.36	91.02	7	7	Amal-Hezbollah
"Reconciliation"	Mount Lebanon IV	98,967	5.43	58.00	12	9	PSP-Future-LF
"Future for Akkar"	North I	76,452	4.20	57.31	7	5	Future-LF
"Future for Beirut"	Beirut II	62,970	3.46	43.78	11	6	Future-PSP
"Strong Lebanon"	Mount Lebanon I	54,544	2.99	58.88	8	4	FPM
"The Future for the North"	North II	51,937	2.85	35.47	11	5	Future
"Unity of Beirut"	Beirut II	47,087	2.58	32.74	6	4	Hezbollah-Amal-Al-Ahbash-FPM-IAF
"Determination"	North II	42,019	2.31	28.70	11	4	Azm Movement
"Together for the North and Lebanon"	North III	40,788	2.24	35.22	9	4	Marada-SSNP-Harb
"National Accord"	Mount Lebanon III	40,669	2.23	56.83	6	4	FPM-Hezbollah-Amal-LDP
"Mountain Pledge"	Mount Lebanon IV	39,027	2.14	22.87	12	4	LDP-FPM-SSNP
"Strong Metn"	Mount Lebanon II	38,897	2.13	59.03	8	4	FPM-SSNP-Tashnaq
"Strong Republic Pulse"	North III	37,376	2.05	32.28	10	3	LF-Kataeb-DLM
"Zahle for Everyone"	Bekaa I	36,391	2.00	39.70	7	3	Future-FPM
"Dignity and Development"	Bekaa III	35,607	1.95	19.03	10	2	Future-LF
"Strong Akkar"	North I	34,430	1.89	28.81	7	2	FPM-JI-LPM
"Strong North"	North III	33,342	1.83	29.79	10	3	FPM-IM-Future Movement
"Better Tomorrow"	Bekaa II	32,578	1.79	49.00	5	3	Amal-Lebanese Arab Struggle
"Future for West Bekaa and Rashaya"	Bekaa II	31,817	1.75	47.86	6	3	Future-PSP
"National Dignity"	North II	29,101	1.60	19.88	9	2	DM-Al-Ahbash-Marada
"Definite Change"	Mount Lebanon I	26,980	1.48	27.08	8	2	LF-NLP
"Baabda Unity & Development"	Mount Lebanon III	26,500	1.40	33.77	5	2	LF-PSP
"Zahle Choice and Decision"	Bekaa I	23,546	1.29	25.69	6	2	Hezbollah-SSNP-Fattouch
"For Everyone"	South I	22,083	1.21	34.02	4	2	PNO-Independents
"Saida and Jezzine Together"	South I	20,127	1.10	31.00	5	2	FPM-JI-Bizri
"Metn Pulse"	Mount Lebanon II	19,003	1.04	21.02	8	2	Kataeb-NLP-Green
"Zahle Our Cause"	Bekaa I	18,702	1.03	20.40	7	2	LF-Kataeb
"Decision is Ours"	Mount Lebanon I	18,553	1.02	16.05	8	2	Khazen-Kataeb-Independents
"Strong Beirut One"	Beirut I	18,373	1.01	42.08	8	4	FPM-Tashnaq-Hunchak-Union for Lebanon, supported by Future
"The South Deserves"	South III	17,058	0.94	7.55	10	0	Independents-LDP-FPM, supported by Future
"Beirut One"	Beirut I	16,772	0.92	38.41	8	3	LF-Kataeb-Pharaon-Ramgavar
"Integrity and Dignity"	South I	16,470	0.90	25.37	5	1	Future-Independents
"Lebanon is Worthy"	Beirut II	15,773	0.87	10.97	10	1	NDP
"Decision for Akkar"	North I	14,449	0.79	10.83	7	0	SSNP-Marada-APG
"Metn Loyalty"	Mount Lebanon II	13,779	0.76	15.24	5	1	Murr-SSNP (Intifada)
"Metn Heart of Lebanon"	Mount Lebanon II	13,138	0.72	14.53	8	1	LF-Ramgavar
"National Unity"	Mount Lebanon IV	12,796	0.70	7.50	10	0	AUP-Toilers League
"National Solidarity"	Mount Lebanon I	12,551	0.69	10.86	8	0	Hezbollah-Independents
"Together towards Change"	South II	11,481	0.63	7.79	6	0	LCP-Independents
"Popular Bloc"	Bekaa I	10,885	0.60	11.87	7	0	Popular Bloc
"Kulluna Watani" (Mount Lebanon IV)	Mount Lebanon IV	9,987	0.55	5.85	11	0	Civil society-Sabaa-Lihaqqi-LCP
"Sovereign Lebanon" (North II)	North II	9,656	0.53	6.59	11	0	Rifi
"Beirut The Homeland"	Beirut II	7,475	0.41	5.20	11	0	Salah Salam-JI
"Kulluna Watani" (Beirut I)	Beirut I	6,842	0.38	15.67	8	1	Civil Society-Sabaa-LiBaladi
"Power of Change"	South I	6,238	0.34	9.61	3	0	LF-Kataeb-11 March
"We are All Beirut"	Beirut II	6,174	0.34	4.29	8	0	Civil society-Sabaa
"A Vote for Change"	South III	5,895	0.32	2.61	7	0	LCP-Independents
"Together for Baabda"	Mount Lebanon III	5,768	0.32	7.35	6	0	Kataeb-NLP-Civil Society
"The Independent"	Bekaa III	5,470	0.30	2.92	10	0	Independents-FPM
"Free Decision"	Mount Lebanon IV	5,446	0.30	3.19	11	0	Kataeb-NLP
"Kulluna Watani" (Mount Lebanon II)	Mount Lebanon II	5,027	0.28	5.56	6	0	Civil Society-Sabaa-MMFD
"Kulluna Watani" (Mount Lebanon III)	Mount Lebanon III	4,992	0.27	6.36	6	0	Civil Society-Sabaa-MMFD
"Lebanon Sovereignty" (North I)	North I	4,713	0.26	3.53	7	0	Rifi
"Enough Talking"	South III	4,710	0.26	2.09	5	0	LF-Independents
"Independent Decision"	North II	4,184	0.23	2.86	9	0	Ahdab-JI
"People's Decision"	North II	4,122	0.23	2.82	7	0	FPM-Kheir
"Development and Change"	Bekaa III	4,053	0.22	2.17	7	0	LCP-Independents
"Kulluna Watani" (North III)	North III	3,160	0.17	2.73	9	0	Civil Society-Sabaa-MMFD
"Civic"	Mount Lebanon IV	2,916	0.16	1.71	8	0	Civil society
"Kulluna Watani" (North II)	North II	2,680	0.15	1.83	10	0	Civil society-Lebanon Vanguard
"Kulluna Watani" (Mount Lebanon I)	Mount Lebanon I	2,526	0.14	2.18	6	0	Civil society-Sabaa-LCP-MMFD
"Kulluna Watani" (South III)	South III	2,262	0.12	1.00	5	0	Civil society-Sabaa
"Akkar’s Decision"	North I	2,032	0.11	1.52	4	0	Independents-Resistance Movement
"Kulluna Watani" (Bekaa I)	Bekaa I	1,599	0.09	1.74	5	0	Civil Society-Sabaa
"Civil Society"	Bekaa II	1,546	0.08	2.33	5	0	Civil Society
"People’s Voice"	Beirut II	1,339	0.07	0.93	10	0	Mourabitoun-People's Movement-SSNP (Intifada)
"We are Beirut"	Beirut I	1,272	0.07	2.91	5	0	Independents
"Dignity of Beirut"	Beirut II	971	0.05	0.68	9	0	Independents
"We Can Change"	South III	659	0.04	0.29	8	0	Lebanese Option
"Beirutis Opposition"	Beirut II	553	0.03	0.38	8	0	Rifi
"Women of Akkar"	North I	498	0.03	0.37	5	0	Independents
"National Cedars"	Bekaa III	491	0.03	0.26	10	0	Independents-Kataeb
"Independent Civil Society"	North II	448	0.02	0.31	7	0	Civil Society
"Independent Beirutis"	Beirut II	410	0.02	0.29	10	0	Independents
"Loyalty to Beirut"	Beirut I	94	0.01	0.22	4	0	Independents
Blank votes		15,029	0.82				
Total		1,822,294	100.00		597	128	

== Reactions ==
=== Domestic ===
Prime Minister Saad Hariri, commenting on the election result the day after the election, admitted that his Future Movement had lost 12 seats, but reaffirmed that "[t]hose who won in parliamentary elections are our partners in the principle of stability" and that he was satisfied with the outcome. Hezbollah Secretary-General Hassan Nasrallah said the outcome was "a great moral and political victory for Hezbollah, which protects the country" and that "proportionality vote law offered all political factions the opportunity to represent themselves in the elections, mitigated the risks of exclusion from Lebanon’s political structure, and assured all sides that they will have a role in the administration." He further added: "The United States and some Persian Gulf states resorted to smear campaign in a bid to poison public opinion towards Hezbollah. Their efforts, however, ended in failure...No one in the world can target Hezbollah as it has firm support among various strata of the Lebanese society. Towns and cities in southern Lebanon have served as the resistance front in the face of threats being poised by the Israeli regime and terrorist groups. Enemies' plots to undermine Hezbollah popularity in those regions have yielded nothing...We must avoid any sectarian or inflammatory speech similar to those delivered before the elections if we want to avoid any conflict in the country."

=== International ===
- Iran – Foreign Ministry Spokesman Bahram Qassemi congratulated the Lebanese government and people. He added: "The Islamic Republic of Iran believes that the holding of peaceful elections under the current circumstances in the region is regarded as a big achievement in the democratic trend for all Lebanese people."
- Israel – Education Minister Naftali Bennett wrote on Twitter: "Hezbollah = Lebanon...[Israel] will not differentiate between the sovereign State of Lebanon and Hezbollah, and will view Lebanon as responsible for any action from within its territory."
- Saudi Arabia and United Arab Emirates – According to Naharnet, the Emirati ambassador and the Saudi chargé d'affaires in Beirut issued a joint statement congratulating Samir Geagea on his electoral victory, after visiting him in Mearab, Mount Lebanon.

== See also ==
- Lebanese presidential election, 2014–2016
