= Al Liwaa =

Lebanese daily newspaper

- Type: Daily newspaper
- Format: Broadsheet
- Founder: Abed Al Ghani Salem
- Publisher: Dar Al Liwaa for Press and Publishing
- Editor-in-chief: Salah Salem
- Founded: 1963; 63 years ago
- Language: Arabic
- Headquarters: Beirut
- Website: Al Liwaa

Al Liwaa (Arabic: اللواء, lit. 'The Flag') is an Arabic daily newspaper published in Lebanon and headquartered in Beirut. It is one of the leading Arabic dailies in the country. In addition, it is one of the oldest publications in Lebanon.

== History and profile ==
Al Liwaa was founded in 1963. The publisher of the paper is Dar Al Liwaa for Press and Publishing which was founded by Abed Al Ghani Salem. As of 2013 Salah Salem was the editor-in-chief of the daily. The daily had a pro-March 14 alliance stance. It is published in broadsheet format.

== Distribution and circulation ==
Al Liwaa is distributed across both Arab countries such as Jordan, Saudi Arabia and Syria, and in European countries, including France, Britain, Greece, Portugal, and Spain. The paper sold 26,000 copies in 2003.

== Charges and attacks ==
In 1996, Al Liwaa was charged by the government with defaming the president and prime minister, and publishing materials deemed provocative to one religious sect. In July 2003, Amer Mashmoushi, a journalist for the daily, was charged with insulting the Lebanese President Emile Lahoud.

In July 2010, Hossam Al Hassan, a journalist for Al Liwaa, was attacked while reporting at the funeral of Sheikh Adel Abu Shanab Tinal at Tenal mosque in Tripoli. Upon this event the paper accused Hezbollah leader Hassan Nasrallah for the incident in an editorial.

In November 2017, the newspaper published an image of Gal Gadot on its front page, claiming she was Collette Vianfi, supposedly an Israeli agent who was said to recruit and work with the Lebanese actor and playwright Ziad Itani. It was later stated that it had been the result of an internal error.

== See also ==
- List of newspapers in Lebanon
