= Faisal Al Sayegh =

Lebanese politician

Faisal Al Sayegh is a Lebanese Druze politician. He was born in 1961. In 1983 he obtained a bachelor's degree in Economics from the American University of Beirut.

Al Sayegh left the Lebanese Democratic Party in 2004. He was elected to parliament from the Aley-Baabda constituency in the 2005 Lebanese general election, being a candidate on the Democratic Gathering list. In May 2022, he won the Parliamentary elections, and the opposition appeal was rejected in November 2022. In July 2022, he was elected member of the Supreme Council for prosecuting presidents and ministers.
