= National Dialogue Party =

National Dialogue Party حزب الحوار الوطني
- Abbreviation: NDP
- Leader: Fouad Makhzoumi
- Founder: Fouad Makhzoumi
- Founded: 2004
- Headquarters: Ras el Nabeh, Beirut
- Ideology: Economic liberalism Secularism
- Political position: Centre-right
- Colors
- Parliament of Lebanon: 1 / 128

Website
- https://alhiwar.com/

The National Dialogue Party (Arabic: حزب الحوار الوطني, romanized: Hizb al-Hiwar al-Watanii) is a secular Lebanese political party founded by businessman Fouad Makhzoumi in 2004. It currently has one seat in the Parliament of Lebanon. The party publishes the Al Hiwar newspaper. Its main office is in the Marj el Zouhour Building, Dona Maria Street in Ras el Nabeh, Beirut.

== Activities ==
Makhzoumi states that its central belief is that the "Lebanese people deserve a government that is free, democratic, and responsive to their needs." As such, the party envisions electoral reforms based upon democracy, transparency in government, secularism, and proportional representation. The party believes that the 2006 Israel-Hezbollah conflict raised the stature of Hezbollah in Lebanon while destabilizing the democratic government.

Makhzoumi also established the Lebanon-based "Makhzoumi Foundation" charity organization providing educational services and public awareness in social issues. He also established the US-based "Future Millennium Foundation".

Makhzoumi is presently the Chairman of Future Pipe Group (FPI), a multinational corporation. He also acted as the President of the International Desalination Association (IDA) between 1995 and 1997, and is currently the Controller of the Association. He acted as well as Vice Chairman of the Institute for Social and Economic Policy in the Middle East at the John F. Kennedy School of Government at Harvard University, between 1995 and 1998. He is currently a member of the International Board of the "Council on Foreign Relations – US/Middle East Project", since 1996.

== See also ==
- List of political parties in Lebanon
