= Ashraf Rifi =

Lebanese politician

Ashraf Rifi أشرف ريفي
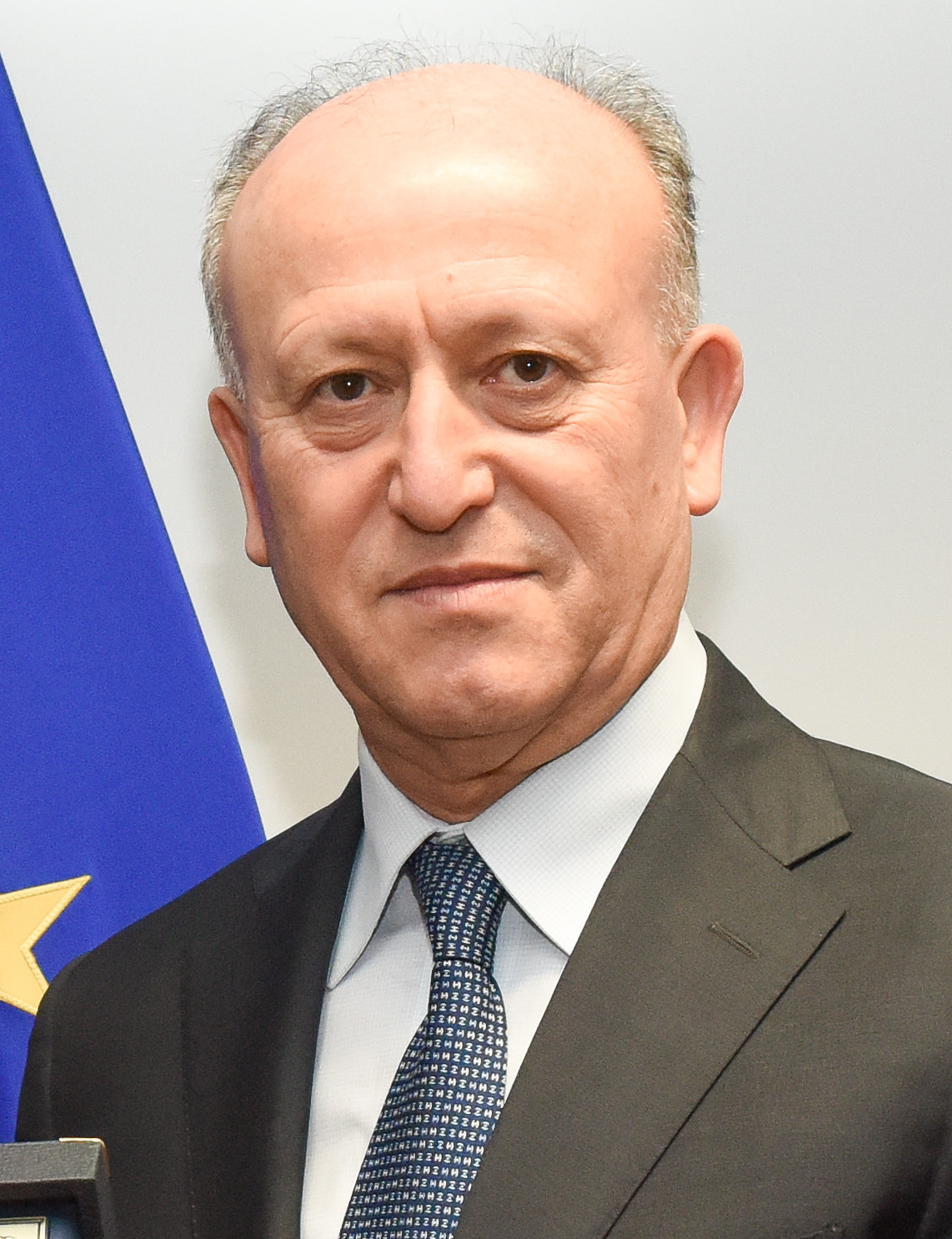
- Rifi in 2015

Member of the Lebanese Parliament
- Incumbent
- Assumed office 21 May 2022
- Preceded by: Najib Mikati
- Constituency: Tripoli (2022)

Minister of Justice
- In office 15 February 2014 – 21 February 2016
- Prime Minister: Tammam Salam
- Preceded by: Shakib Qortbawi
- Succeeded by: Salim Jreissati

General Director of the Lebanese Internal Security Forces
- In office 1 April 2005 – 1 April 2013
- Preceded by: Ali Al Hajj
- Succeeded by: Roger Salem

Personal details
- Born: 1 April 1954 (age 72) Tripoli, Lebanon
- Party: Future Movement (former); Sanad Movement (2023–present)
- Other political affiliations: Renewal Bloc
- Children: 4
- Education: Lebanese University

Military service
- Allegiance: Lebanon
- Branch/service: Lebanese Armed Forces
- Years of service: 1976–2013
- Rank: Major General
- Battles/wars: Lebanese Civil War

Ashraf Rifi (Arabic: أشرف ريفي; also spelled Achraf Rifi) (born 1 April 1954) is a Lebanese politician and former police chief. He was the general director of the Lebanese Internal Security Forces (ISF; the national police) from 2005 to 2013 and served as minister of justice from 15 February 2014 to 21 February 2016. He is a member of the Renewal Bloc in the Lebanese Parliament.

== Early life and education ==
Rifi was born into a Muslim Sunni family in Tripoli, Lebanon on 1 April 1954. He attended Lebanese University (LU), studying the sociology of crime. He studied police work abroad during assignments with police forces in Ottawa, Ontario, Canada; Maisons-Alfort, France; and Saudi Arabia.

== Career ==
=== Security forces ===
Rifi joined the Police of the North Governorate in 1976 and was first posted as a Police Lieutenant in Halba from 1976 to 1978. Thereafter, he was Police Chief or Deputy Police Chief of various small towns in Akkar, Koura and Byblos, before joining the Anti Smuggling Unit of Tripoli Police in 1983 as a Major. Having gotten trained in explosive detection and disposal in France in 1980–1981, between 1985 and 1988 he was part of the security detail of Prime Minister Rashid Karami and Salim Hoss. As a Lieutenant Colonel, he was loaned out to the Saudi Interior Ministry as a security officer between 1988 and 1992. Promoted to Colonel in 1992, between 1992 and 1994, he was Chief of the Riot Police in Beirut, and Chief of Police in Central Beirut between 1994 and 1996. Between 1996 and 1997, he was the Police Chief of Sidon City. As a Brigadier, he became Head of Police of the North Governorate in 1997, Chief of Beirut Police in 2000, and Chief of Modernisation in 2002. He was promoted to major general in April 2005 when he was named to head the national police due to the resignation of former head, Ali Al Hajj. Rifi is one of the board members of the Prince Nayef University for Security Studies. Rifi has close ties to Saudi Arabia.

Rifi's term ended on 1 April 2013 and he retired due to mandatory age limit. Rifi's term was not extended by the Lebanese government, leading to resignation of premier Najib Mikati in March 2013. Hezbollah members of the Mikati cabinet did not endorse the extension of his term. Roger Salem, who had been deputy of Rifi since December 2012, succeeded Rifi as head of the ISF. Saad Hariri proposed Rifi as a new prime minister, but his proposal was not supported.

Rifi as a general director of internal Security Forces was very open to cooperate with civil society organizations. For example, he supported the partnership between ISF and YASA (youth association for social awareness) in many road safety interventions that contributed positively for road safety in Lebanon. He supported the efforts that led to the new Lebanese traffic law #243 that was enacted by the Lebanese parliament in 2012.

=== Politics ===
Rifi was appointed justice minister in the cabinet led by Tammam Salam on 15 February 2014. He resigned as justice minister on 21 February 2016, due to his disapproval of the influence of Hezbollah, the Lebanese Shiite political group, in the Lebanese government. Rifi quit by order of Saudi Arabia according to the assertions of Al Jazeera while they pulled a $3-billion deal to equip the Lebanese security forces and blamed Hezbollah's influence for preventing Lebanon from backing Saudi Arabia in the Gulf kingdom, saying it was "destroying Lebanon's relations with the kingdom of Saudi Arabia."

In April 2021, he heavily criticized Hezbollah, calling them a collaborator of "mini-Nazi" Iran and an enemy to Lebanon.

Ashraf Rifi ran in the 2022 general elections as part of a Lebanese Forces-supported list in the North II district and managed to win one of the Sunni seats in Tripoli. In May 2023, Rifi launched the Sanad Movement which would work under the principles of sovereignty and democracy and vowed to lift Iranian grip over Lebanon.

On 9 June 2023, Ashraf Rifi disclosed to OTV that he increased the representation of Lebanese Christians in the Internal Security Forces from 27% to 40.2%. During the 2025 municipal elections he also expressed concerns over the lack of Christian and Alawite representation in the Tripoli Municipal Council and also supported splitting Beirut into 2 separate Muslim and Christian councils to improve Christian representation in the city.

== Personal life ==
Rifi is married to Salima Adeeb and together have 4 children. He is a Sunni Muslim.

== Awards ==
The Arab Organization for Administrative Development for the Arab League and the Tatweej Academy for Excellence and Quality awarded Rifi the title of Man of the Year 2011 in the Arab world for his leadership in security in December 2011.
