= 2018 Lebanese general election in Beirut I =

2018 Lebanese general election
- 6 May 2018

8 seats to the Parliament of Lebanon
- Turnout: 32.46%
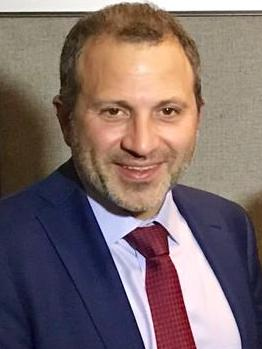

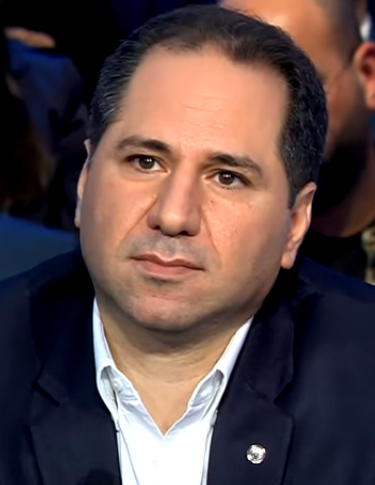
	First party	Second party	Third party
Leader	Gebran Bassil	Samir Geagea	Samy Gemayel
Party	FPM	Lebanese Forces	Kataeb
Alliance	Parties: FPM; Tashnag; Hunchak Party; Independents
Leader's seat	Batroun	Did not stand	Metn
Seats won	4	2	1
Popular vote	18,373	8,530	4,096
Percentage	42.08%	19.076%	9.38%
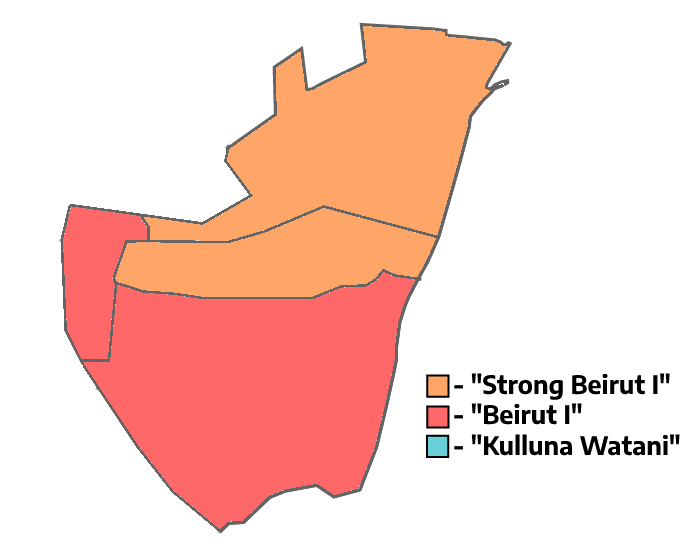
- List voting by region

Voting to elect eight members of the Lebanese parliament took place in the Beirut I district (one of two electoral districts in the city) on 6 May 2018, part of the general election of that year. The constituency had 134,355 (2018) registered voters, out of whom 43,353 voted.

== Background ==
=== 2017 vote law ===
As per the new Vote Law adopted by parliament on June 16, 2017, the electoral districts of Beirut were reorganized. The old Beirut I district merged with the Medawar quartier (previously in Beirut II), the new district retaining the name 'Beirut I'. The new Beirut I district received the two Armenian Orthodox seats of the former Beirut II district, whilst the Minorities seat was shifted from the Muslim-domonated Beirut III district to the new Beirut I district.

== Demographics ==
The Eastern first Beirut electoral district covers 4 quartiers (neighbourhoods) of the Lebanese capital: Achrafieh, Saifi, Rmeil and Medawar. The area is predominantly Christian; the largest community in the Beirut I electorate are Armenian Orthodox (28.33%). 19.2% are Greek Orthodox, 13.19% Maronite, 9.8% Greek Catholic, 9.76% Sunni, 5.57% Armenian Catholic, 3.95% Syriac Catholic, 3% Latin Catholics, 1.97% other Minorities groups, 2.88% Evangelicals, 1.99% Shia and 0.37% Druze or Alawite.

== Voting ==
Ahead of the 2018 Lebanese general election, 5 lists were registered in the Beirut I electoral district. After the split between the Future Movement and the Lebanese Forces, a joint list of the Free Patriotic Movement, the Armenian Revolutionary Federation (Tashnaq) and the Hunchaks was conceived ("Strong Beirut I") supported by the Future Movement. The Future Movement itself, however, stayed aloof from fielding candidates. The Lebanese Forces, together with the Kataeb Party, Ramgavars and Michel Pharaon, and with support from Antoun Sehnaoui, fielded their list under the label "Beirut I". Michelle Tueni fielded a third list, "We Are Beirut", being joined by incumbent Future MP Serge Torsarkissian.

For the Minorities seat the FPM fielded a Syriac Orthodox candidate, former Brigadier General Antoine Pano, whilst the Tueni list included Latin Catholic candidate Rafic Bazerji, an independent from a family historically close to the National Liberal Party.

=== Candidates ===
List	Armenian Orthodox, 3 seats			Maronite, 1 seat	Greek Orthodox, 1 seat	Greek Catholic, 1 seat	Armenian Catholic, 1 seat	Minorities, 1 seat
"Strong Beirut I"	Hakop Terzian; 3,451 (7.90%) (Tashnaq)	Alexander Matossian; 2,376 (5.44%) (Tashnaq)	Sebouh Kalpakian (Hunchak)	Massoud Achkar (Union for Lebanon)	Nicolas Chammas	Nicolas Sehnaoui; 4,788 (10.7%) (FPM)	Serg Gukhadarian (Tashnaq)	Antoine Pano; 539 (1.23%) (FPM)
"Beirut I"	Carole Babikian	Avedis Datsian (Ramgavar)	Alina Kaloussian (Ramgavar)	Nadim Gemayel; 4,096 (9.38%) (Kataeb)	Emad Wakim; 3,936 (9.01%) (Lebanese Forces)	Michel Pharaon	Jean Talouzian; 4,166 (9.54%)	Riad Akel (Lebanese Forces)
"Kulluna Watani"	Paula Yacoubian; 2,500 (5.73%) (Sabaa)	Laury Haytayan (LiBaladi)	Levon Telvizian (LiBaladi)	Gilbert Doumit (LiBaladi)	Ziad Abs (Sah)	Lucien Bourjeily (You Stink)	Yorgui Teyrouz (LiBaladi)	Joumana Haddad(LiBaladi)
"We are Beirut"	Seybou Makhjian			Georges Sfeir	Michelle Tueni		Serge Torsarkissian	Rafic Bazerji
"Loyalty to Beirut"				Roger Choueiri	Robert Obeid		Antoune Qalaijian	Gina Chammas
ACE Project, Ministry of Interior and Municipalities
