= 2022 Lebanese general election in Beirut I =

2022 Lebanese general election
- 15 May 2022

8 seats to the Parliament of Lebanon
- Turnout: 35.83% (2.64pp ▲)
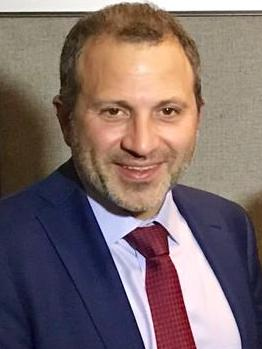

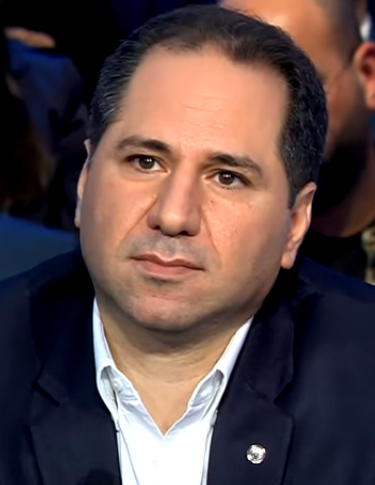
| | First party | Second party | Third party |
|---|---|---|---|
| Leader | Samir Geagea | Hagop Pakradounian | Gebran Bassil |
| Party | Lebanese Forces | Tashnag | FPM |
| Leader's seat | Did not stand | Metn | Batroun |
| Last election | | 2 |
| Seats before | 2 | | 2 |
| Seats won | 2 | 1 | 1 |
| Seat change | 0 | ▼1 | ▼1 |
| Popular vote | 11,677 | 4,958 | 4,781 |
| Percentage | 25.95% | 11.02% | 10.62% |
| Swing | ▲15.69pp | ▼4.37pp | ▼1.91pp |
| | Fourth party | Fifth party |
| Leader | Samy Gemayel | Various |
| Party | Kataeb | Oct 17 Movement |
| Leader's seat | Metn | Did not stand |
| Last election | | 1 |
| Seats before | 1 |
| Seats won | 1 | 2 |
| Seat change | 0 | ▲1 |
| Popular vote | 4,425 | 10,484 |
| Percentage | 9.83% | 23.3% |
| Swing | ▲0.2pp | ▲7.35pp |
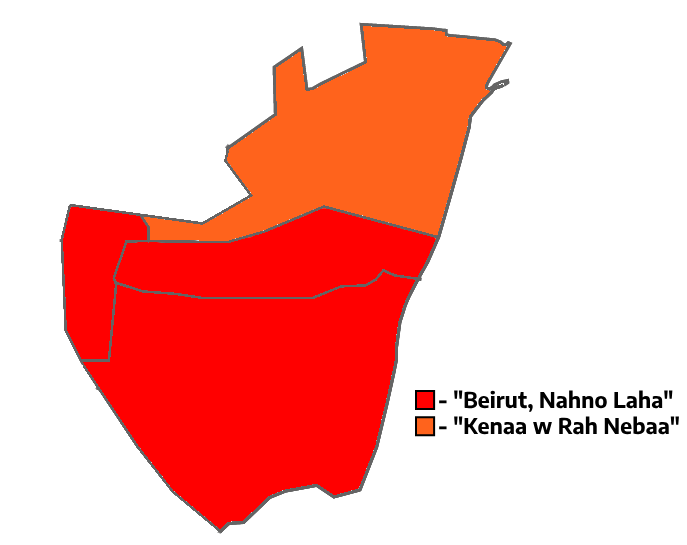
- List voting by region

Voting to elect eight members of the Lebanese parliament took place in the Beirut I district (one of two electoral districts in the city) on 15 May 2022, part of the general election of that year. The constituency had 134,886 registered voters out of whom 48,311 voted.

== Background ==
=== 2017 vote law ===
As per the new Vote Law adopted by parliament on June 16, 2017, the electoral districts of Beirut were reorganized. The old Beirut I district merged with the Medawar quartier (previously in Beirut II), the new district retaining the name 'Beirut I'. The new Beirut I district received the two Armenian Orthodox seats of the former Beirut II district, whilst the Minorities seat was shifted from the Muslim-domonated Beirut III district to the new Beirut I district.

== Demographics ==
The Eastern first Beirut electoral district covers 4 quartiers (neighborhoods) of the Lebanese capital: Achrafieh, Saifi, Rmeil and Medawar. The area is predominantly Christian; The largest of them are Armenian Orthodox (28.33%) 19.2% are Greek Orthodox, 13.19% Maronite, 9.8% Greek Catholic, 9.76% Sunni, 5.57% Armenian Catholic, 3.95% Syriac Catholic, 3% Latin Catholics, 1.97% other Minorities groups, 2.88% Evangelicals, 1.99% Shia and 0.37% Druze or Alawite.

== Lists and parties ==
The eastern part of the capital was devastated by August 4 explosion in 2020 which strongly distanced the inhabitants of these neighborhoods from the long-running political powers which gave a significant increase in popularity for opposition candidates who were running in behalf of the 17 October Revolution. The Lebanese Forces and the Kataeb Party still had large population amongst Christian voters especially due to the Free Patriotic Movement's decline.

Ahead of the elections, six lists were registered in the district. After the electoral split between Nadim Gemayel and the Lebanese Forces, Nadim Gemayel was forced to create joint list of the Kataeb Party and independents such as Jean Talozian who left the Lebanese Forces Bloc. The Future Movement did not nominate nor support any list after Saad Hariri's political boycott. The Lebanese Forces, together with the Hunchak Party and other independents, fielded their list under the label "Beirut, Nahno Laha". The Free Patriotic Movement again fielded a list with the Tashnag Party but without intention of creating a joint bloc in the Lebanese Parliament. The other lists were made up of opposition candidates of the October 17 Movement which was an alliance of multiple activist organizations. It included, Citizens in a State which was fielded by party leader Charbel Nahas, Liwatani which was led by Palua Yacobian fielded by Tahalof Watani and ReLebanon, and the Beirut Madinati list which also competed in previous municipal elections.

=== Candidates ===
| Name | Armenian Orthodox 3 | | | Armenian Catholic 1 | Maronite 1 | Greek Orthodox 1 | Greek Catholic 1 | Minorities 1 |
|---|---|---|---|---|---|---|---|---|
| Loubnan Al Seyada (Kataeb) | Annie Seferian | Talar Markosian | Leon Semergian | Jean Talozian | Nadim Gemayel (Kataeb) | Asma Andraos | Najib Lyan | Antoine Siryani |
| Kenna W Rah Nebaa (FPM – Tashnaq) | Alexander Matossian (Tashnaq) | Hagop Terzian (Tashnaq) | George Govelkian | Serge Malkonian (Tashnaq) | Elie Aswad | Carla Boutros | Nicolas Sehnaoui (FPM) | Chamoun Chamoun |
| Beirut, Nahno Laha (Lebanese Forces, Hunchak) | Jihad Pakradouni (pro-Lebanese Forces) | Aram Malian (Hunchak) | | | George Chehwan | Ghassan Hasbani (Lebanese Forces) | Fadi Nahhas | Elie Sharbashi (Lebanese Forces) |
| Liwatani | Paola Yacoubian (Tahalof Watani) | Magui Nanijian (Tahalof Watani) | Diana Ohanian (Tahalof Watani) | Brigette Shalbian (Tahalof Watani) | Ziad Abi Chaker (Tahalof Watani) | Ziad Abs (ReLebanon) | Charles Fakhoury (ReLebanon) | Cynthia Zarazeer (ReLebanon) |
| Kadreen (Citizens in a State) | | | | | Moussa Khoury (MMFD) | Mary Jreidini (MMFD) | Charbel Nahhas (MMFD) | Roy Ibrahim (MMFD) |
| Beirut Madinati | Levon Telvezian (Madinati) | | | | Pierre Al Gemayel (Madinati) | Tarek Ammar (Madinati) | Nada Sehnaoui (Madinati) | Jacques Jendo (Madinati) |

== Results ==
Result of the diaspora vote in Beirut I
| Contients | 2018 | | 2022 | |
| Contients | Pop. | % | Pop. | % |
|---|---|---|---|---|
| Lebanese Forces | 296 | 16.15% | 1,561 ▲ | 26.07% ▲ |
| Free Patriotic Movement | 269 | 14.68% | 461 ▲ | 7.7% ▼ |
| Kataeb | 198 | 10.8% | 599 ▲ | 10% ▼ |
| Tashnag | 398 | 21.71% | 175 ▼ | 2.92% ▼ |
| Oct 17 Movement | 332 | 18.11% | 2,775 ▲ | 46.34% ▲ |
| Other | 340 | 18.55% | 417 ▲ | 6.96% ▼ |
| Total Lebanese diaspora population registered in Beirut I | 1,833 | 100% | 5,988 ▲ | 100% |

The Lebanese Forces party saw expected gains by fielding its prominent member, Ghassan Hasbani, who received 16% of the district votes alone. It was expected to will three seats but lost the Minorities seat to the Liwatani list, despite having more votes, in which an appeal was made to the constitution court to contest the loss. Its allied party, the Hunchak party, rivaled the Armenian Tashnag party but failed to gain any seats.

The Kataeb Party won two seats with Nadim Gemayel and Jean Talouzian of the Armenian Catholic seat. The ticket under the name Lubnan Al Siyada (Sovereign Lebanon) received 24% of the votes in its historical stronghold.

The Kenaa w Rah Nebaa ticket, which comprised Free Patriotic Movement members and Tashnag, had lost popularity since the 2019 revolution as they were blamed for the crisis. In 2018, both parties received 42% of the votes compared to the 23% they received in the 2022 general elections.

Two reformist candidates won in Beirut 1: Paola Yacobian and Cynthia Zarazir, who are members of the Tahalof Watani and ReLebanon organization, which aligns themselves to the October 17 Movement. The ticket received 8,261 votes. The Qadreen ticket, which comprised members of the Citizens in a State, earned 3.23 percent of votes. Party leader Charbel Nahas was a candidate in the district but received only 1,265 votes.

| List | Votes | % | Seats | Members elected | Parties |
|---|---|---|---|---|---|
| "Beirut, Nahno Laha" | 13,220 | 28.55% | 2 | Hasbani, Pakradouni | LF-Hunchak |
| "Lubnan Al Siyada" | 11,271 | 24.34% | 2 | Gemayel, Talouzian | Kataeb |
| "Kenaa w Rah Nebaa" | 10,950 | 23.65% | 2 | Terzian, Sehnaoui | FPM-Tashnag |
| "LiWatani" | 8,261 | 17.84% | 2 | Yacoubian, Zarazir | Tahalof Watani-ReLebanon |
| "Qadreen" | 1,510 | 3.26% | 0 | | MMFD |
| "Beirut Madinati" | 1,089 | 2.35% | 0 | | Beirut Madinati |
