= Beirut I =

Electoral district in Lebanon

- Constituency for the Parliament of Lebanon
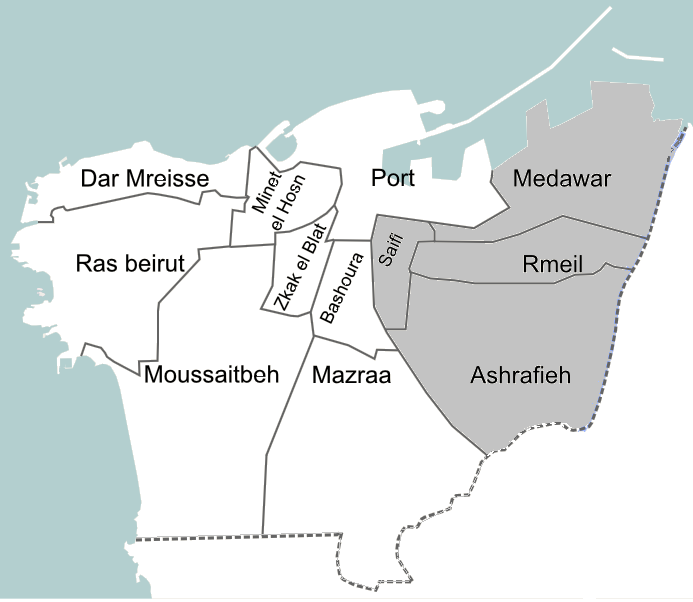
- Governorate: Beirut
- Electorate: 134,355 (2018)

Current constituency
- Created: 2017
- Number of members: 8 (3 Armenian Orthodox, 1 Armenian Catholic, 1 Greek Catholic, 1 Greek Orthodox, 1 Maronite, 1 Minorities)

Beirut I (Arabic: دائرة بيروت الأولى) is an electoral district in Lebanon. The district elects eight members of the Lebanese National Assembly – three Armenian Orthodox, one Armenian Catholic, one Greek Catholic, one Greek Orthodox, one Maronite and one Minorities.

The Beirut I electoral district covers four quartiers (neighbourhoods) of the Lebanese capital: Achrafieh, Saifi, Rmeil and Medawar. The area is predominately Christian; the largest community in the Beirut I electorate are Armenian Orthodox (28.33%). 19.2% are Greek Orthodox, 13.19% Maronite, 9.8% Greek Catholic, 9.76% Sunni, 5.57% Armenian Catholic, 3.95% Syriac Catholic, 3% Latin Catholics, 1.97% other Minorities groups, 2.88% Evangelicals, 1.99% Shia and 0.37% Druze or Alawite.

== 1960–1972 ==
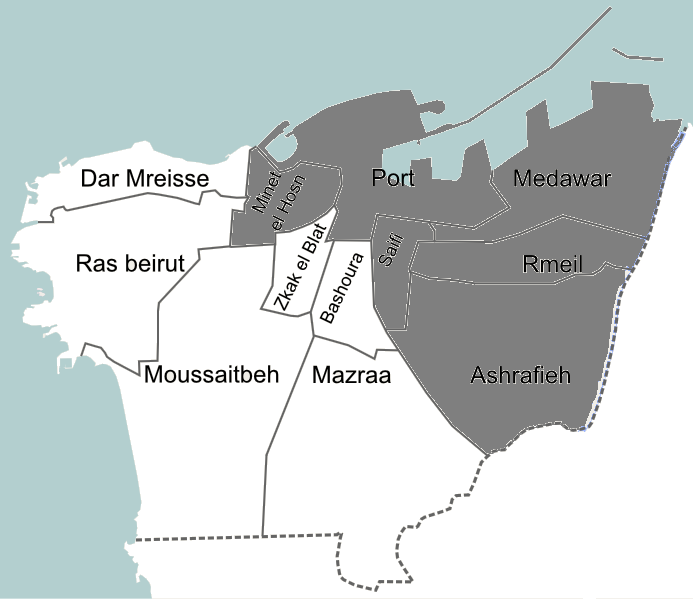
Beirut I electoral district 1960–1972

Beirut I was a parliamentary constituency in Lebanon. It covered six neighbourhoods (quartiers) of the capital; Achrafieh, Medawar, Minet El Hosn, Port, Rmeil and Saifi. It elected eight Christian parliamentarians; three Armenian Orthodox, one Armenian Catholic, one Protestant, one Maronite, one Greek Orthodox and one Greek Catholic. This constituency was used in the 1960, 1964, 1968 and 1972 elections.

=== 1960 Election Law ===
The constituency was established as part of the 1960 Election Law. In the 1957 parliamentary election Beirut had been divided into two constituencies. Achrafieh, Rmeil and Saifi had been part of the Christian-dominated first district, whilst Medawar, Minet El Hosn and Port had been part of the predominantly Muslim second district. The issue of the delimitations of the Beirut constituencies had been contested, but an agreement between Christian and Muslim leaders was reached on February 23, 1960, by which there was agreement that Beirut I would be assigned eight Christian seats. The Election Law was passed in April 1960.

=== Demographics ===
On April 4, 1960, the census office published a voters list, which stated that Beirut I had 21,600 Armenian Orthodox registered voters, 16,459 Greek Orthodox, 13,654 Maronites, 8,861 Sunni Muslims, 7,403 Armenian Catholics, 5,121 Jews, 5,059 Greek Catholic, 3,161 Protestants, 2,702 Syriac Catholics, 2,200 Shia Muslims, 1,117 Latin Catholics, 748 Chaldean Catholics, 460 Syriac Orthodox, 152 Druze and 180 persons belonging to other religious groups. Minet El Hosn hosted the majority of the Jewish community in Lebanon.

As of April 1972 it was estimated that Beirut I had 32,190 Armenian Orthodox voters, 16,709 Greek Orthodox, 13,899 Maronites, 8,046 Greek Catholics, 6,573 Sunni Muslims, 5,352 Armenian Catholics, 3,558 Jews, 3,082 Syriac Catholics, 2,749 Armenian Protestants, 2,070 Latin Catholics and 1,831 Shia Muslims.

=== Members of Parliament elected from Beirut I ===
	Armenian Orthodox			Armenian Catholic	Protestant	Maronite	Greek Orthodox	Greek Catholic
1960	Movses Der Kaloustian	Khatchig Babikian	Souren Khanamirian	Joseph Chader	Charles Saad	Pierre Gemayel	Fouad Boutros	Antoine Sehnawi
1964	Movses Der Kaloustian	Khatchig Babikian	Souren Khanamirian	Joseph Chader	Charles Saad	Pierre Gemayel	Fouad Boutros	Antoine Sehnawi
1968	Movses Der Kaloustian	Khatchig Babikian	Souren Khanamirian	Joseph Chader	Samir Ishaq	Pierre Gemayel	Michel Georges Sassine	Nasri Maalouf
1972	Melkon Eblighatian	Khatchig Babikian	Souren Khanamirian	Joseph Chader	Antranig Manoukian	Pierre Gemayel	Michel Georges Sassine	Nasri Maalouf

=== 1960 election ===
In the 1960 general election there were two main lists in Beirut I. The election was won by the People's List, a joint list of the Kataeb Party and the Armenian Revolutionary Federation. The main challenger had been the National Front list headed by Pierre Eddé.

=== 1964 election ===
In a surprise move ahead of the 1964 general election, Camille Chamoun withdrew his candidates from Beirut I. In the end, all candidates of the Kataeb-Armenian Revolutionary Federation 'People's List' were elected unopposed.

=== 1968 election ===
During the 1968 general election the electoral district had 98,439 eligible voters, out of whom 28,631 voted (29.59 percent, the lowest turn-out of all constituencies). The elections in Beirut I passed smoothly without violent incidents. The four Armenian parliamentarians were elected unopposed. Pierre Gemayel won the Maronite seat and his fellow Kataeb member Samir Ishaq won the Protestant seat. Michel Georges Sassine won the Greek Orthodox seat whilst and the Greek Catholic on Sassine's list Nasri Maalouf was also elected.

=== 1972 election ===
In the 1972 general election, the last election to be held before the outbreak of the Lebanese Civil War, all candidates of the Kataeb-Armenian Revolutionary Federation-National Liberal list were elected. The main contender had been the Protestant candidate Tony Saad, who mustered 10,778 votes. 33.9 percent of the registered voters cast their ballots.

After the Civil War, a new set-up of constituencies was used ahead of the 1992 general election abolishing the 1960 Election Law constituencies.

== 2009 ==
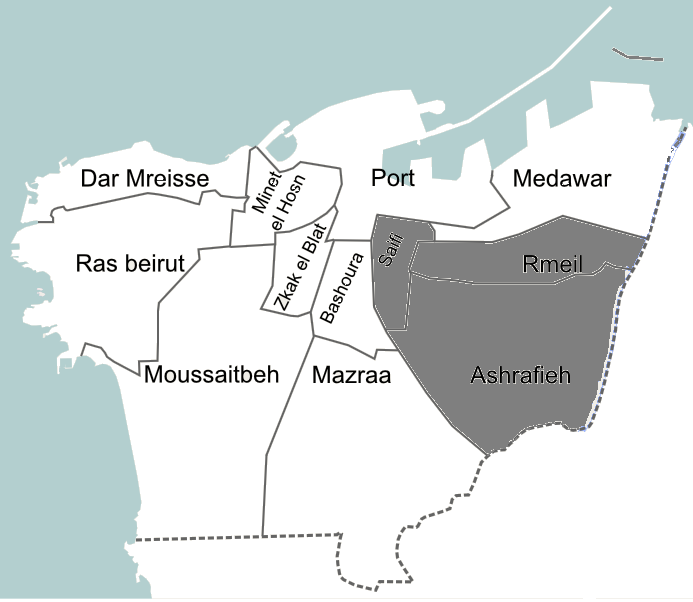
Beirut I constituency boundary, covering 3 neighbourhoods in eastern Beirut

Beirut I was an electoral district in Lebanon. It covered three neighbourhoods (quartiers) in the eastern parts of the capital; Achrafieh, Rmeil and Saifi. The constituency elected five members of the Parliament of Lebanon; one Maronite, one Greek Orthodox, one Greek Catholic, one Armenian Orthodox and one Armenian Catholic (for more information on the Lebanese electoral system, see Elections in Lebanon). The constituency was created with the 2008 Doha Agreement, ahead of the 2009 parliamentary election.

=== Creation ===
The boundaries and the sectarian seat allocation of the electoral district were defined by the 2008 Doha Agreement, which instituted election districts similar to those of the 1960 Election Law. The creation of Beirut I meant that for the first time since the 1972 parliamentary election there was a Christian-majority electoral district in Beirut (between 1960 and 1972 there was a Christian-majority Beirut I electoral district with slightly different boundaries). The new Election Law was formally adopted on September 28, 2008.

=== Demographics ===
The majority of the Christian population of Beirut lives in Beirut I. The Ministry of Interior and Municipalities reported in 2011 that the constituency had 91,486 voters and the following religious composition: 26.2% Greek Orthodox, 16.73% Maronites, 16.2% Armenian Orthodox, 12.94% Greek Catholic, 11.0% other Christian Minorities, 7.0% Sunni Muslims and 5.2% Armenian Catholics. According to an article in Nahar newspaper published in May 2008, 2.24% of the registered voters of Beirut I were Protestants, 1.89% Shia Muslims and 0.28% Druze. However, many of the registered voters of Beirut I live overseas.

=== 2009 election ===
During the 2009 election there were 92,764 registered voters in Beirut I. Before the election a lot of attention was given to the race in Beirut I, as it was one of a handful of electoral districts where the outcome was difficult to predict on forehand. Both March 8 and March 14 sought to mobilize overseas voters to come to Lebanon for the voting day. However, incumbent parliamentarian Michel Pharaon criticized the mobilization of overseas voters.

==== Free Decision List ====
The 'Free Decision List' was the list aligned with the March 14 alliance. As of March 20, 2009 the March 14 candidates in Beirut I were Nadim Gemayel (son of Bashir Gemayel) of the Kataeb Party for the Maronite seat, Michel Pharaon of the Future Movement for the Greek Catholic seat, Nayla Tueni (daughter of Gebran Tueni) for the Greek Orthodox seat. However, the alliance had difficulties defining the Armenian candidates for their list. Both March 8 and March 14 tries to get the Armenian Revolutionary Federation (Tashnaqs) to contest on their list. Thus both alliances hesitated to nominate Armenian candidates before the Tashnaq party declared its allegiance.

In November 2008, Tashnaq leaders met with a number of key personalities such as President Michel Suleiman, Prime Minister Fouad Siniora, Speaker Nabih Berri, Ministers Elias Murr, Tamam Salam and Tarek Mitri, Jean Kahwaji (Commander-in-Chief of the Lebanese Armed Forces), Sheikh Abdel Amir Kabalan, Maronite Patriarch Nasrallah Boutros Sfeir and Metropolitan Elias Audi. On December 1, 2008, a group of Tashnaq leaders met with Syrian president Bashar al-Assad. On March 8, 2009, Tashnaq leader Mekhitarian met with Saad Hariri and Michel Murr to discuss the upcoming election. Reportedly Hariri offered the Tashnaqs 4 out of 6 Armenian seats in Lebanon. On April 2, 2009, the Tashnaqs publicly stated that they would contest the elections in alliance with Michel Aoun, rejecting Hariri's offer. The Ramgavar and Hunchak parties were willing to contest on the March 14 list, but the Lebanese Forces also nominated an Armenian Catholic candidate, Richard Kouyoumjian. Many meetings took place to solve the issue. Pharaon presented the candidate of Sebouh Mkjian for the Armenian Orthodox seat. By April 25, 2009, Pharaon withdrew the candidature of Mkhjian. Only on May 20, 2009, did the Lebanese Forces leader withdraw the candidature of Kouyoumjian. In the end the Armenian Orthodox candidate on the March 14 list was Jean Ogassapian of the Ramgavar Party and the sitting parliamentarian Serge Torsarkissian of the Hunchak Party stood as the candidate for the Armenian Catholic seat. The list was publicly declared on May 27, 2009.

==== Aoun list ====
The candidates on the list linked to Michel Aoun were declared on April 1, 2009; Massoud Achkar for the Maronite seat, Nicolas Sehnaoui for the Greek Catholic seat, Deputy Prime Minister Issam Abu Jamra of the Free Patriotic Movement for the Greek Orthodox seat, Vrej Sabounjian of the Tashnaq Party for the Armenian Orthodox seat and fellow Tashnaq member Gregoire Kaloust for the Armenian Catholic seat.

==== Voting ====
37,284 voters cast their votes in Beirut I (40.19%). All five candidates on the March 14 list were elected.

Seat	Winning candidate			Runner-up			Margin
Armenian Catholic	Serge Torsarkissian (Hunchak)	19,821	51.7%	Gregoire Kaloust (Tashnaq)	16,817	45.1%	2,464
Armenian Orthodox	Jean Ogassapian (Ramgavar)	19,317	51.8%	Vrej Sabounjian (Tashnaq)	16,778	45%	2,539
Greek Catholic	Michel Pharaon (Future Movement)	19,742	52.9%	Nicolas Sehnaoui (Independent)	16,730	44.9%	3,012
Greek Orthodox	Nayla Tueni (Independent)	19,985	53.6%	Issam Abu Jamra (Free Patriotic Movement)	16,421	44%	3,564
Maronite	Nadim Gemayel (Kataeb)	19,340	51.9%	Massoud Achkar (Independent)	17,209	46.1%	2,131

Only for the Greek Orthodox seat was there a third candidate with more than 13 votes; Georges Christoforeides who got 177 votes (0.47%). There were 201 invalid ballots and 183 blank ballots.

== 2018 ==
=== 2017 Vote Law ===
As per the new Vote Law adopted by parliament on June 16, 2017, the electoral districts of Beirut were reorganized. The old Beirut I district merged with the Medawar quartier (previously in Beirut II), the new district retaining the name 'Beirut I'. The new Beirut I district received the two Armenian Orthodox seats of the former Beirut II district, whilst the Minorities seat was shifted from the Muslim-domonated Beirut III district to the new Beirut I district.

=== Election ===
Ahead of the 2018 Lebanese general election, 5 lists were registered in the Beirut I electoral district. After the split between the Future Movement and the Lebanese Forces, a joint list of the Free Patriotic Movement, the Armenian Revolutionary Federation (Tashnaq) and the Hunchaks was conceived ("Strong Beirut I") supported by the Future Movement. The Future Movement itself, however, stayed aloof from fielding candidates. The Lebanese Forces, together with the Kataeb Party, Ramgavars and Michel Pharaon, and with support from Antoun Sehnaoui, fielded their list under the label "Beirut I". Michelle Tueni fielded a third list, "We Are Beirut", being joined by incumbent Future MP Serge Torsarkissian.

For the Minorities seat the FPM fielded a Syriac Orthodox candidate, former Brigadier General Antoine Pano, whilst the Tueni list included Latin Catholic candidate Rafic Bazerji, an independent from a family historically close to the National Liberal Party.

=== Result by lists ===
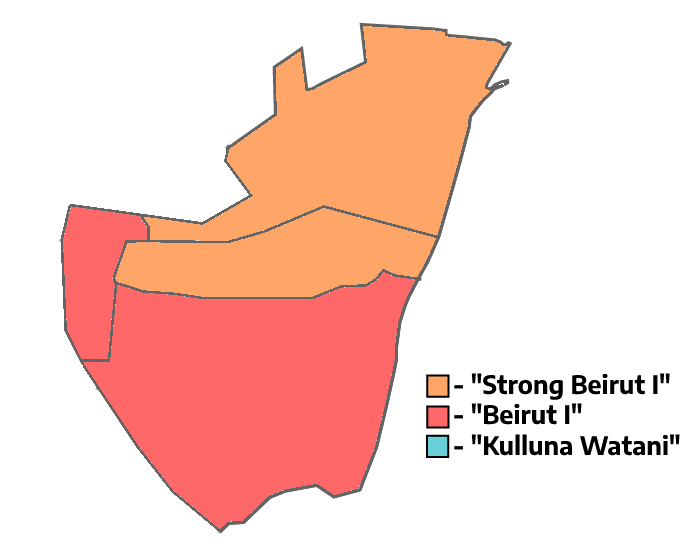
Results of the 2018 Lebanese general election in Beirut I by sub district

List	Votes	%	Seats	Members elected	Parties
"Strong Beirut I"	18,373	42.08	4	Sehnaoui, Terzian, Matossian, Pano	FPM-Tashnaq-Hunchak-Union for Lebanon, supported by Future
"Beirut I"	16,772	38.41	3	Talouzian, Gemayel, Wakim	LF-Kataeb-Pharaon-Ramgavar
"Kulluna Watani"	6,842	15.67	1	Yacoubian	Saaba-You Stink-Sah-LiBaladi
"We are Beirut"	1,272	2.91	0		Independent
"Loyalty to Beirut"	94	0.22	0		Independent

== 2022 ==
The eastern part of the capital was devastated by August 4 explosion in 2020 which strongly distanced the inhabitants of these neighborhoods from the long-running political powers which gave a significant increase in popularity for opposition candidates who were running in behalf of the 17 October Revolution. The Lebanese Forces and the Kataeb Party still had large population amongst Christian voters especially due to the Free Patriotic Movement's decline.

Ahead of the elections, six lists were registered in the district. After the electoral split between Nadim Gemayel and the Lebanese Forces, Nadim Gemayel was forced to create joint list of the Kataeb Party and independents such as Jean Talozian who left the Lebanese Forces Bloc. The Future Movement did not nominate nor support any list after Saad Hariri's political boycott. The Lebanese Forces, together with the Hunchak Party and other independents, fielded their list under the label "Beirut, Nahno Laha". The Free Patriotic Movement again fielded a list with the Tashnag Party but without intention of creating a joint bloc in the Lebanese Parliament. The other lists were made up of opposition candidates of the October 17 Movement which was an alliance of multiple activist organizations. It included, Citizens in a State which was fielded by party leader Charbel Nahas, Liwatani which was led by Palua Yacobian fielded by Tahalof Watani and ReLebanon, and the Beirut Madinati list which also competed in previous municipal elections.

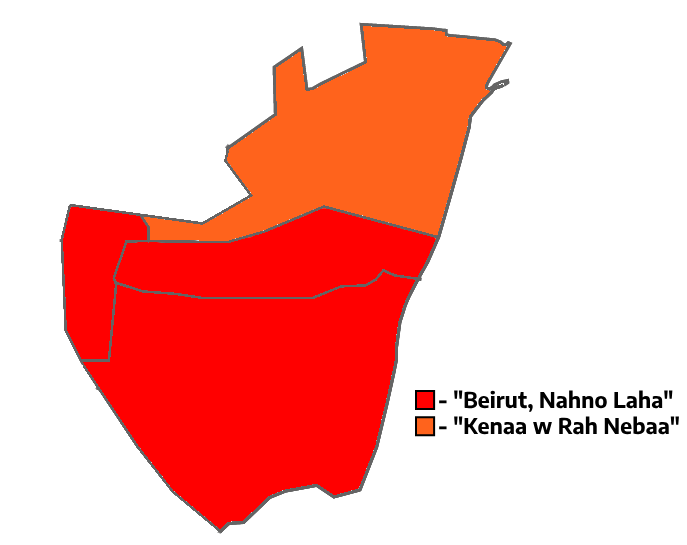
Results of the 2022 Lebanese general election in Beirut I by sub district

=== Results by list ===
List	Votes	%	Seats	Members elected	Parties
"Beirut, Nahno Laha"	13,220	28.55	2	Hasbani, Pakradouni	LF-Hunchak
"Lubnan Al Siyada"	11,271	24.34	2	Gemayel, Talouzian	Kataeb
"Kenaa w Rah Nebaa"	10,950	23.65	2	Terzian, Sehnaoui	FPM-Tashnag
"LiWatani"	8,261	17.84	2	Yacoubian, Zarazir	Tahalof Watani-ReLebanon
"Qadreen"	1,510	3.26	0		MMFD
"Beirut Madinati"	1,089	2.35	0		Beirut Madinati

== See also ==
- Wadi Abu Jamil
- Minorities (Lebanon)
