= Corruption in Lebanon =

Corruption in Lebanon (Arabic: الفساد في لبنان) has been a severe and persistent problem since the end of the civil war in 1990. It has been described as a case of "post-conflict corruption." Once a taboo subject, it is now at the forefront of the public debate in Lebanon. Anti-corruption sentiment has been one of the driving forces behind many of the large-scale Lebanese protests in recent history.

== History ==
Transparency International's 2025 Corruption Perceptions Index, which scored 182 countries on a scale from 0 ("highly corrupt") to 100 ("very clean"), gave Lebanon a score of 23. Lebanon's scores of 22 and 23 in 2024 and 2025 were its lowest scores since the current version of the Index was introduced in 2012. When ranked by score in 2025, Lebanon ranked 153rd among the 182 countries in the Index, where the country ranked first is perceived to have the most honest public sector. For comparison with regional scores, the best score among Middle Eastern and North African countries (Note: Algeria, Bahrain, Egypt, Iran, Iraq, Israel, Jordan, Kuwait, Lebanon, Libya, Morocco, Oman, Qatar, Saudi Arabia, Syria, Tunisia, United Arab Emirates, and Yemen) was 69, the average was 39 and the worst was 13. For comparison with worldwide scores, the best score was 89 (ranked 1), the average was 42, and the worst was 9 (ranked 181 in a two-way tie).

According to Charles Adwan, Director of the Lebanese Transparency Association, "the extension of wartime elites into the post-war political system, a common feature in post-conflict countries, resulted in a system which removed all checks and balances and facilitated the diversion of state resources for private financial and political gain". Government officials reportedly often award contracts to friends and family, leading to many of the country's problems, like daily power cuts. Many working-class Lebanese citizens rely on economic assistance from their party, which stops them from speaking up against the system or bringing them to justice, despite widespread opposition. Lebanon's government works within the framework of confessionalism, with parliamentary seats and other government positions allocated by religious confession. Many members of government have been in power since the Lebanese Civil War, with mere shuffling of positions every election cycle. Many blame this system for the country's continued corruption.

Corruption happens on every level of society and is not strictly limited to high-level officials. As in many neighboring countries, using what is locally known as wasta or personal family and party connections to get favors like skipping a long queue, getting into a selective institution, or finding a job is common practice and has become the social norm. Although many believe that using wasta is understandable for each individual case, as institutions are often inefficient without it, it is also agreed upon that the social phenomenon deepens economic inequality.

== Speaker of Parliament Nabih Berri ==
The Speaker of Parliament since 1992 and lawyer by training, Nabih Berri allied himself to Hezbollah to enrich himself and appointed a long list of political loyalists who also enriched themselves while draining the country's public funds.

There is no official disclosure of Nabih Berri's net worth, as he was never forced to publicly disclose his financial assets. Estimates regarding his personal wealth are highly speculative and vary drastically, with some reports suggesting an unconfirmed fortune in the tens of millions and others alleging a multi-billion dollar empire built through state and regional connections.

He achieved large personal gains over decades at the detriment of the rule of law and Lebanon's sovereignty by maintaining an unconditional alliance with Hezbollah. Amal and Hezbollah members resorted to street violence and threats by organizing intimidation parades on motorcycles with light weapons in hand.

He disregarded many constitutional deadlines and aborted timely financial reforms. Most notably, he summoned 57 sessions to elect a president between 2014 and 2025 while simultaneously sabotaging their proper democratic procedure: 45 consecutive failed sessions in the 2014–2016 Presidential Vacancy and 12 consecutive failed sessions in the 2022-2025 Presidential Vacancy. His coalition made of his Development and Liberation bloc and the Loyalty to the Resistance Bloc - and their partner such as the Free Patriotic Movement systematically walked out to break the quorum and sabotaged the democratic procedure. Consequently, the cumulative periods of presidential vacancy under Berri's watch exceed five years.

== Public reaction and opposition ==
Anti-corruption sentiment has been one of the driving forces behind many of the large-scale Lebanese protests in recent history. Notably, the 2015–2016 Lebanese protests sparked by the closure of a waste dump without a plan, which triggered a "garbage crisis" and the 2019–2020 Lebanese protests sparked by an increase in taxes

Many anti-system parties run on anti-corruption platforms, most notably Beirut Madinati, which ran during the 2016 Beirut municipal election. Although the party lost, it gained unprecedented traction for an outsider party in Lebanon's otherwise rigid political status quo. With 40% of the votes, it forced the March 14 Alliance and the March 8 Alliance, historical opponents, to form a coalition in order to win

== Contaminated fuel scandal ==
In July 2020, Lebanese company ZR Energy was indicted, as it had imported contaminated fuel from Algerian company Sonatrach, which cost $2bn worth of fuel deliveries per year.

== Beirut port explosion ==
On 4 August 2020, an explosion at the port of Beirut killed at least 190 people, injured more than 6,500, and left around 300,000 people homeless, as well as costing an estimated $15bn in damages. The blast was caused by 2,750 tons of ammonium nitrate that had been stored unsafely in a warehouse. Many attribute the explosion to government negligence and corruption, and among its results were the eruption of protests all over Lebanon and the resignation of the entire cabinet, with the government remaining in a caretaker capacity. Domestic investigations into the explosion have been repeatedly delayed, obstructed and blocked by Hezbollah leaders, by threatening the presiding judge and orchestrating political manipulations. The two main foci of the investigation were Ali Hassan Khalil, a former finance minister, and Ghazi Zaiter, a former public works minister, both belonging to the Amal movement, strongly allied with Hezbollah. Senior officials refused to show up for the investigation, and four years after the explosion, there were still no arrests made.

== Anti-corruption organizations ==
There are some NGO's fighting corruption in Lebanon:

- Lebanese Transparency Association, which is Transparency International's chapter in Lebanon, focuses on curbing corruption and promoting the principles of good governance.
- Sakker El Dekkene: aims to raise public awareness about the dangers of corruption and its high cost to the economy, and to promote a culture of integrity and good governance in Lebanon.
- Junior Chamber International (JCI): a non-profit organization of 200,000 young people, ages 18 to 40, who are in Lebanon.
- The Lebanese Advocacy and Legal Advice Centre (LALAC): an initiative launched by the Lebanese Transparency Association-No Corruption. It aims to inform citizens about their legal rights and encourages victims and witnesses to take action against cases of corruption.

== Bibliography ==
- Adwan, Charles (2004). "Corruption in Reconstruction: The Cost Of National Consensus in Post-War Lebanon" (PDF). S2CID 155822549.
- Adwan, Charles/Sahyoun, Rabee’, 2001: « Post-war profiteering » in Lebanon: The story of Reconstruction, The Lebanese Transparency Association, 2001, http://www.transparency-lebanon.org/Archives/Post-war%20Profiteering.PDF (Dec. 5, 2006)
