= 2016 Lebanese municipal elections =

← 2010	8, 15, 22, 29 May 2016	2025 →
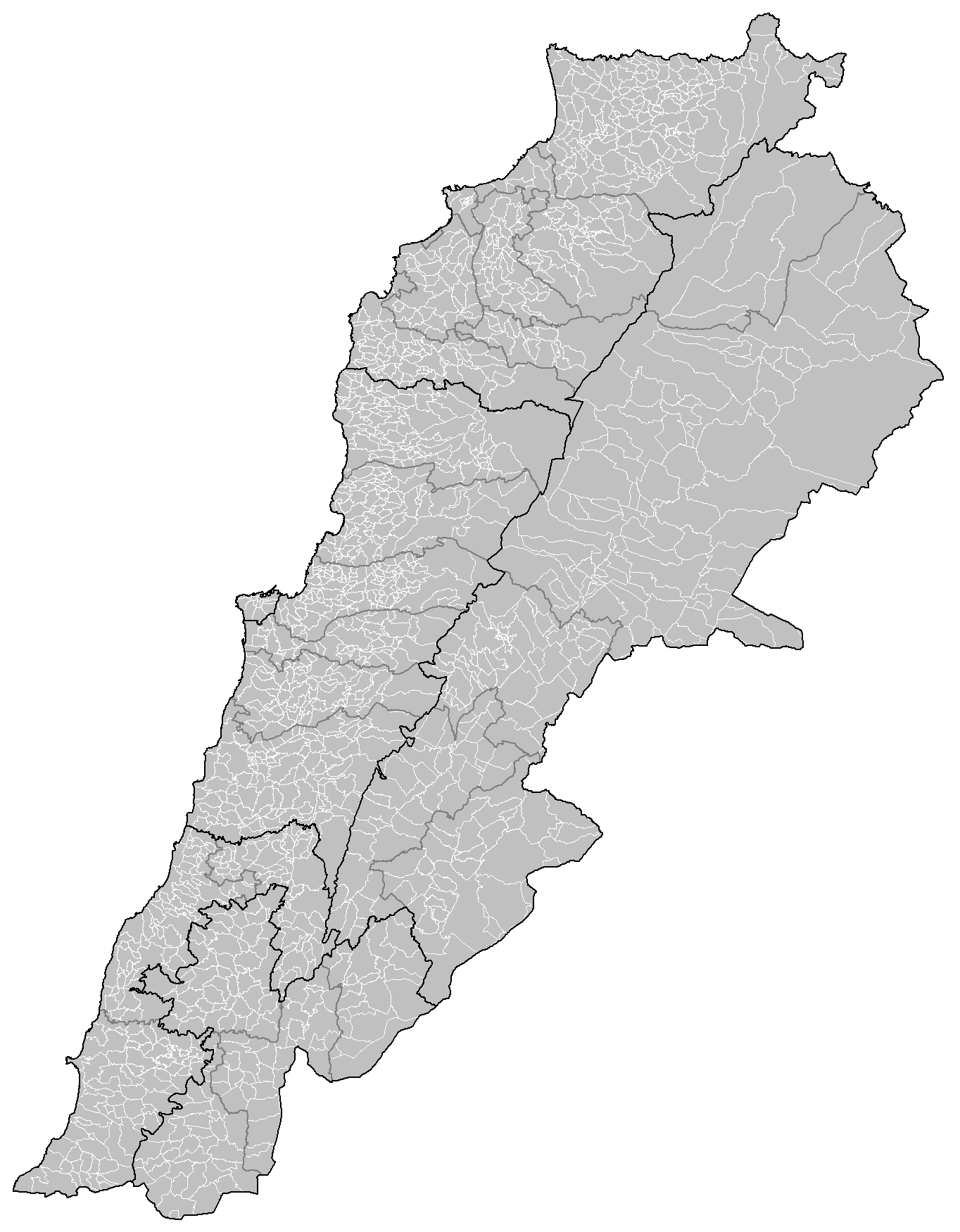

Municipal elections were held in Lebanon in May 2016.

== Electoral system ==
Municipalities in Lebanon are governed by a municipal council. The number of seats on each council ranges from nine to 21, depending on the size of the city, while the largest cities, Beirut and Tripoli have 24 members each. Candidates run on lists and are elected according to plurality at-large voting, meaning voters can cast one vote for as many candidates as there are available seats, and the candidates with the most votes are elected. The system incentivizes cross-sectarian cooperation on lists in order to secure as many votes as possible and can often lead to landslide victories with only a plurality of the vote.

Elections were held on multiple dates in May, depending on governorate, with municipalities in Beirut, Beqaa, and Baalbek-Hermel on May 8, Mount Lebanon on May 15, South Lebanon and Nabatieh on May 22, and North Lebanon and Akkar on May 29.

== Baalbek ==
In Baalbek the traditional Shia alliance of Hezbollah and Amal, alongside the Association of Islamic Charitable Projects, formed the Development and Loyalty list, facing the Baalbek Madinati list formed by the Future Movement and the Islamic Group, both Sunni parties. The initial result showed a very close outcome, but after a recount it was shown that the Development and Loyalty list had a decisive win.

List	Candidates	Average votes	%	Seats
Development and Loyalty (Hezbollah, Amal, AICP)	21	7,404	53.4	21
Baalbek Madinati (Future, JI)	20	5,058	36.5	0
MMFD	3	320	2.3	0
Independents	3	516	3.7	0
Total	47	13,861	100.0	21
Registered voters/turnout		31,510	44.0	

== Beirut ==
Most of the traditional political parties came together to form the Beirutis List, which was composed of the Future Movement, the Free Patriotic Movement, the Amal Movement, the Lebanese Forces, the Kataeb Party, and the Armenian Revolutionary Federation. The list transcended the division between the March 8 and March 14 alliances. They were opposed by Beirut Madinati, a reformist coalition of civil society and activist groups. Citizens in a State ran on their own list, where their leader Charbel Nahas received 6,917 votes. The Association of Islamic Charitable Projects ran a single candidate, Mohammad Mashaqa. Hezbollah declined to join or back any list. The Beirutis list won all 24 seats.

List	Candidates	Average votes	%	Seats
Beirutis List (Future, FPM, Amal, LF, Kataeb, ARF)	24	43,095	44.3	24
Beirut Madinati	24	29,353	30.2	0
AICP	1	13,654	14.0	0
MMFD	4	3,532	3.6	0
Beirut List	19	2,560	2.6	0
Al-Beiruti List	12	718	0.7	0
Independents	9			0
Total	93	97,347	100.0	24
Registered voters/turnout		476,021	20.1	

== Jounieh ==
The election in Jounieh, a Christian city, was contested by two lists—The Dignity of Jounieh list, backed by the Free Patriotic Movement and Kataeb, and the Jounieh al-Tajaddod list, backed by the Lebanese Forces and influential local figures such as Neemat Frem and Farid Haykal el-Khazen. The election was extremely close, with some candidates only being dozens of votes away from being elected.

List	Candidates	Average votes	%	Seats
Dignity of Jounieh (FPM, Kataeb)	18	4,535	45.4	14
Jounieh al-Tajaddod (LF, Frem)	18	4,378	43.8	4
Total	36	9,995	100.0	18
Registered voters/turnout		16,524	60.4	

== Saida ==
The election in Saida was a competition between the various Sunni forces in the city. The Future Movement, led in Saida by Bahia Hariri, created the Saida's Development list, with the backing of the Islamic Group and former mayor Abdel Rahman el-Bizri, of the influential Bizri family. This was the same alliance of forces that contested the 2010 election on the Loyalty and Development list. They were opposed by the Voice of People list, created by the left-wing Popular Nasserist Organization led by Osama Saad. The Saad family are historical rivals with the Bizris, and more recently the Hariris. A third list, Al-Ahrar, composed of Islamists, was led by Ali Sheikh Ammar, a former leader in the Islamic Group. A number of its candidates were alleged to be supporters of Salafi cleric Ahmed al-Assir, who has been detained since 2015 for his role in a number of armed clashes in Saida.

List	Candidates	Average votes	%	Seats
Saida's Development (Future, JI, Bizri)	21	14,283	53.0	21
Voice of People (PNO)	21	7,947	29.5	0
Al-Ahrar	9	2,277	8.4	0
Total	51	26,970	100.0	21
Registered voters/turnout		60,610	44.5	

== Tripoli ==
In Tripoli, the Tripoli's Choice list backed by former General Director of the Internal Security Forces Ashraf Rifi upset the For Tripoli list backed by many of the city's traditional parties and zuama, including the Future Movement, the Azm Movement of Najib Mikati, the Dignity Movement of Faisal Karami, and Mohammad Safadi. For Tripoli was a successor to the Tripoli Consensus list which won in the 2010 elections. In addition, the Tripoli Capital list also ran, backed by former MP Misbah El-Ahdab. Tripoli's Choice performed strongest amongst Sunnis (the vast majority of the population), while For Tripoli was stronger with Christians and Alawites.

List	Candidates	Average votes	%	Seats
Tripoli's Choice (Rifi)	24	16,475	36.3	16
For Tripoli (Future, Azm, Dignity, JI, AICP)	24	15,427	34.0	8
Tripoli Capital	14	1,975	4.4	0
MMFD	1	945	2.1	0
FPM	1	429	0.9	0
Independents	1	4,411	9.7	0
Total	65	45,380	100.0	24
Registered voters/turnout		176,000	25.8	

== Zahle ==
In Zahle, the Lebanese Forces, the Free Patriotic Movement, and the Kataeb Party formed an alliance with former mayor Asaad Zogheib under the list Zahle Development. They were challenged by the Zahle Al-Amana list, backed by the Popular Bloc of the influential Skaff family of Zahle, and the Zahle Deserves list, headed by Moussa Fattoush, brother of former MP Nicholas Fattoush. Hezbollah did not run candidates of their own, but declared they would direct their votes towards FPM candidates, as well as members of the other two lists. Zahle Development swept all 21 seats, with just 11 votes separating their lowest candidate from the highest vote-getter on Zahle Al-Amana, Youssef Skaff.

List	Candidates	Average votes	%	Seats
Zahle Development (LF, FPM, Kataeb)	21	10,157	37.8	21
Zahle Al-Amana (Popular Bloc)	21	7,930	29.5	0
Zahle Deserves	21	6,005	22.3	0
MMFD	1	361	1.3	0
Independents	13			0
Total	77	26,886	100.0	21
Registered voters/turnout		64,623	41.6	
