= Kalpakian =

Kalpakian or Kalpakyan (Armenian: Գալբագեան) is a surname of Armenian origin. Notable people with the surname include:

- Arda Kalpakian (born 1944), Lebanese Olympic athlete
- Laura Kalpakian (born 1945), American author
- Sebouh Kalpakian (born ?), Lebanese Armenian politician
- Sirvart Kalpakyan Karamanuk (1912–2008), Armenian composer, pianist
