= Al-Ahdab =

Al-Ahdab or El-Ahdab (Arabic: الأحدب; Hebrew: אלאחדב) is a surname. Notable people with the surname include:

- Khayreddin al-Ahdab (1894–1941), prime minister of Lebanon
- Isaac ibn al-Ahdab (c. 1350–c. 1426), Jewish mathematician from Spain
- Misbah El-Ahdab (born 1962), Lebanese politician
