= Avedis Guidanian =

Lebanese politician

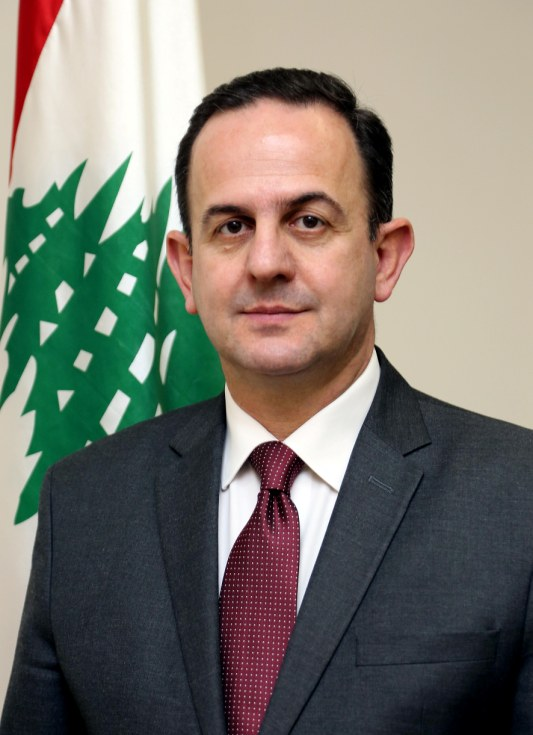

Minister of Tourism
- In office December 2016 – 21 January 2020
- President: Michel Aoun
- Prime Minister: Saad Hariri
- Preceded by: Michel Pharaon
- Succeeded by: Ramzi Msharrafieh

Personal details
- Born: Avedis Guidanian; November 21, 1966 (age 59)
- Citizenship: Lebanese
- Party: Armenian Revolutionary Federation
- Children: 2
- Education: Armenian Catholic Mesrobian High School
- Alma mater: Lebanese University

Avedis Guidanian (Armenian: Աւետիս Կիտանեան, Arabic: أواديس كيدانيان; born 21 November 1966) is the former Minister of Tourism in Lebanon. He is a member of the ARF political party.

== Biography ==
=== Early life ===
Avedis Guidanian was born on 21 November 1966. He had enrolled his secondary education in Armenian Catholic Mesrobian High School. He holds a degree in Physics from the Lebanese University.

=== Life As an ARF party member ===
He is member of Armenian Revolutionary Federation and had various roles in it. He was chosen as the chairman of Zavarian Student Association of ARF and represented the party in the group of Lebanese parties as well as in numerous assemblies. He had participated in political parties' international assemblies that were held in Kazakhstan and Cambodia.

In 1998, he was elected as member of ARF Central Committee of Lebanon for the first time. From 2001 till 2005 he was the foreman of ARF Central Committee of Lebanon. Since 2009, he has been the principal of Voice of Van. In 2015, he was elected as the vice-representative of ARF Central Committee of Lebanon.

=== Personal life ===
He is married and has two children.
