= 1972 Lebanese general election =

- 16–30 April 1972

All 100 seats in the Parliament of Lebanon
- Turnout: 54.38% (▲4.81pp)
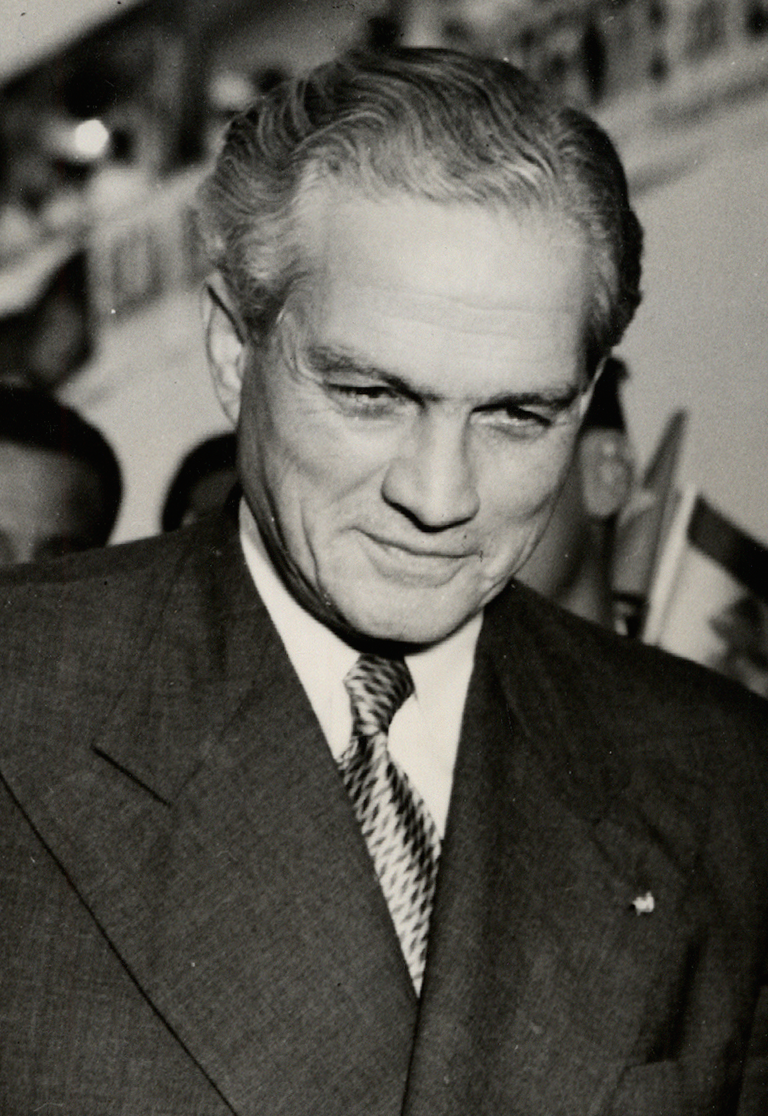

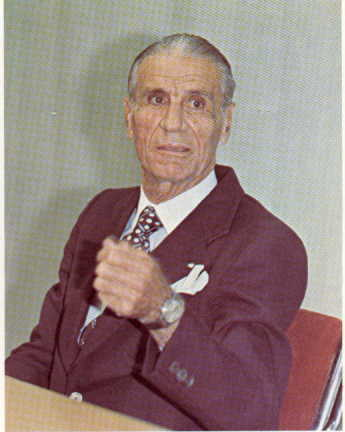

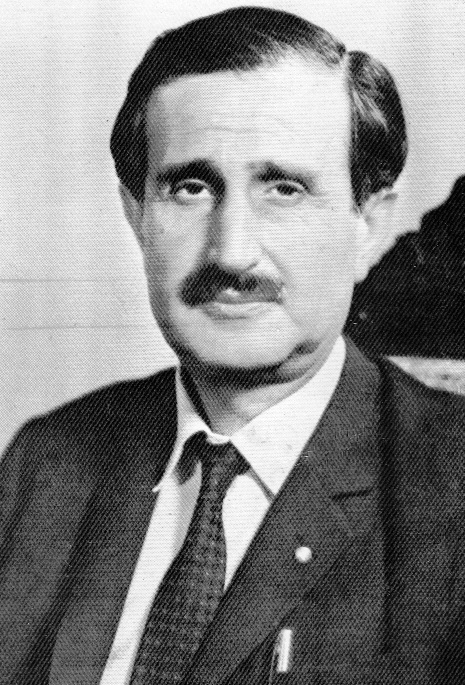
	First party	Second party	Third party
Leader	Camille Chamoun	Pierre Gemayel	Kamal Jumblatt
Party	National Liberal	Kataeb	PSP
Leader's seat	Chouf	Beirut I	Chouf
Last election	8	9	5
Seats won	11	7	5
Seat change	▲3	▼2	0
	Fourth party
Leader	Melkon Eblighatian
Party	ARF
Leader's seat	Beirut I
Last election	4
Seats before	4
Seats won	5
Seat change	▲1

General elections were held in Lebanon between 16 and 30 April 1972. Independent candidates won a majority of seats, although most of them were considered members of various blocs. Voter turnout was 54.4%.

== Background ==
According to the 1960 electoral law, the 99 seats were divided amongst ethnic and religious groups:

Group	Seats
Maronite Christians	30
Sunni Muslims	20
Shi'ite Muslims	19
Greek Orthodox	11
Druze	6
Greek Catholics	6
Armenian Orthodox	4
Protestants	1
Armenian Catholics	1
Other	1

== Results ==
The majority of MPs – 63 of the 100 – were elected as independents. However, 52 of them were considered to be members of parliamentary blocs, including 9 in the Faranjiyyah bloc, 9 in the Skaff bloc, 7 in the Assad bloc (which also included the 2 Democratic Socialist Party MPs), 7 in the Karami bloc, 6 in the Hamada bloc, 4 in the Armenian Revolutionary Federation block (which also included the party's single MP), 4 in the Arslan bloc, 3 in the Jumblatt bloc (which also included the five Progressive Socialist Party MPs) and 3 in the Salam bloc.

Party	Votes	%	Seats	+/–
National Liberal Party			11	+3
Kataeb Party			7	–2
Progressive Socialist Party			5	0
National Bloc			4	–2
Party of the Constitutional Union			3	0
Lebanese Social Democratic Party			2	New
Socialist Arab Lebanon Vanguard Party			1	New
Democratic Party			1	New
National Action Movement			1	0
Armenian Revolutionary Federation			5	+1
Union of Working People's Forces			1	New
Social Democrat Hunchakian Party			0	New
Armenian Democratic Liberal Party			0	New
Syrian Social Nationalist Party			0	New
Lebanese Communist Party			0	New
Independents			63	+1
Total			104	+1
Total votes	721,022	–		
Registered voters/turnout	1,326,016	54.38		
Source: Nohlen et al.
