= Sakker El Dekkene =

- Founded: May 15, 2014
- Type: Anti-Corruption
- Purpose: combatting corruption
- Location: Lebanon

Sakker El Dekkenne (Arabic: "Close the Shop") is a Lebanese NGO, set up in 2014 to combat institutional corruption in Lebanon. The mission of the NGO is to raise awareness about the extent of corruption in order to exert leverage on public administrations and Lebanese citizens at large to refrain from engaging in acts of corruption. Sakker El Dekkene runs guerrilla advertising campaigns and uses an online reporting mechanism and a telephone hotline to collect data on bribery taking place throughout the country.

== Background ==
The Sakker El Dekkene initiative was launched due to the perception that corruption in Lebanon is simply a way of life. Lebanon has consistently been ranked among the world's most corrupt countries, with corruption and bribery taking place from the highest echelons of government and private business to everyday interactions between citizens.

Sakker El Dekkene was set up to effect wholesale change in the national consciousness. By increasing the visibility of the rampant corruption taking place, the NGO hopes to raise the issue as a major topic of public discourse and sow the seeds of radical change.

== Activities ==
=== Dekkenet Al Balad ===
Sakker El Dekkene was launched on 15 May 2014, with the opening of "Dekkenet Al Balad" in Gemmayzeh, Beirut. Dekkenet Al Balad was a temporary shop which was opened by the NGO with the intention of physically manifesting the idea behind the whole initiative: that Lebanon is a cornershop where everything- including your rights- is for sale.

=== Guerrilla campaign ===
Sakker El Dekkenne launched a guerilla campaign that included stencilling, postering and even the creation of an "Anti-Corruption Car" that parks outside corrupt public institutions encouraging people to report acts of bribery that they have taken part in or witnessed.

=== Film ===
As a part of the launch of the initiative, a film illustrating the problem of corruption in Lebanon was designed. It had been viewed tens of thousands of times within a few days of its publication on YouTube.com

The video can be viewed here:

- "Sakker El Dekkene (Uncensored Version) - YouTube". youtube.com.

=== Website ===
The NGO also launched a Report to fight corruption. This website contains the reporting mechanism for reporting bribes and gives a detailed overview of reported incidents all over Lebanon. The website also contains details of publications and events, relevant legal information, an "integrity test", information about the NGO and links to relevant articles about the NGO and corruption at large. As of April of 2024 nearly inactive the NGO lost control of the site sakkera.com and is now operating under sakkera.org.

=== App ===
There is also a mobile app that can be downloaded from the website which allows the individual to report corruption on the move and contains much of the information accessible through the website.

=== Social media ===
Sakker El Dekkenne also has a Facebook page (https://www.facebook.com/sakkerel.dekkene?fref=ts) which is regularly updated with news and information about corruption in Lebanon and the work of the NGO. There is also an interactive game whereby Facebook users can "purchase" items such as driving licenses in order to help raise awareness about the NGO.

=== Educational Programs ===
Sakker el Dekkene has developed training programs to give young participants the knowledge and skills to fight corruption. Sakker el Dekkene has worked with different schools in various ways: short lectures, stunt activities, and more elaborate programmes.

== Research ==
Sakker el Dekkene has produced several reports to gain factual knowledge about the actual degree of corruption in specific areas. The reports can be found on the site of Sakker El Dekkene

=== Customs Report ===
In the bribe reports conducted by Sakker el Dekkene, customs and the Port of Beirut are often mentioned and rank as the 5th most corrupt institution. The research found that the cost per container for a trouble-free ride through customs varies between 75,000 LBP and 150,000 LBP, whether the declaration is legal or not. In the analysis of the 2013 trade data, a total of $794.2 million is paid in small bribes, big bribes, and unpaid VAT.

=== Integrity Compliance Report ===
The Integrity Compliance Report has been a cooperation between Sakker el Dekkene and the Ministry of Economy and Trade in the period December 2015 - June 2016. A survey conducted with 68 employees of the Ministry led to 3 key findings:

- Ministry's leadership is perceived to be willing to fight corruption and leading by example
- Anti-corruption policies, processes and governance are weak and non-existent within the ministry
- Several types of corruption are visible in the Ministry

The survey conducted with key stakeholders in private institutions led to 3 key findings:

- Performance has been improving over the past 5 yards
- Ministry's leadership is perceived as lacking integratie
- The Ministry's procedures are perceived as lacking transparency

Additionally, while shadowing 17 field inspectors, key gaps in service delivery and potential for corruption was identified. The report also recommends policies to overcome these key gaps.

== Awards ==
Sakker el Dekkene won the first Wajih Ajouz Award for best online activism campaign on October 17, 2014.

In December of the same year, Sakker el Dekkene campaign was awarded 9 prizes at the Cristal Festival Europe. The prizes include:

- Grand Prix for Best Integrated Content Campaign for the MENA region
- Brand Entertainment Academy Grand Prix
- 1 Gold in Best Use or Integration of Experiential events
- 1 Gold in Best Integrated Content Campaign
- 1 Gold in Best Product Launch
- 1 Silver in Integrated Campaign
- 1 Silver in Best use of Ambient
- 1 Bronze in Best Launch Campaign
- 1 Bronze in Integrated Campaign

In 2015 Sakker el Dekkene won 17 awards at various Award Festivals for its creative, integrated and interactive campaigns. These include:

Dubay Lynx Awards 2015

- 1 gold in BC&E: Live Experience
- 1 gold in BC&E: Use or Integration of Digital or Social Media
- 1 gold in Design: Posters
- 1 silver in BC&E: Integrated Content Campaign
- 1 siler in Direct: Ambient Media: Large Scale
- 1 silver in Media: Integrated Campaign
- 1 bronze in Integrated
- 1 bronze in Interactive: Integrated Multi-Platform Campaign
- 1 bronze in Outdoor: Special Build
- 1 bronze in P&A: Use of Promotional Stunts/Live Advertising

ADFEST Awards 2015

- silver in Promo: Events & Field Marketing

MENA Digital Awards

- gold in Best Integrated Media Campaign
- gold in Digital Cause Marketing
- silver in Best Integrated Digital Campaign
- bronze in Best Use of Video

Cannes Lions International Festival of Creativity

- gold LION in Media

Facebook Awards 2015 SHORTLIST: New Frontiers

== Links ==
- Dekkene Movie: Sakker El Dekkene (Uncensored Version) el
- Dekkene activities: Sakker El Dekkene Activities (May 22) el
- Dekkene in the News: :
