= 2016 Beirut municipal election =

Local election in Lebanon

Municipal election in the Lebanese capital Beirut was held on 8 May 2016. Election was held for 24 seats in the municipal council of the city.

Some 470,000 persons were eligible to vote in the election. The population of Beirut is around four times larger than the electorate, as many Beirut residents remains in the electoral census of their ancestral home villages.

The two main contending lists were the Beirutis' List and Beirut Madinati ('Beirut is my city'). The Beirutis' List was supported by Saad Hariri, and included politicians from both the 14 March Alliance and the 8 March Alliance. Amongst the parties supporting the list were the Future Movement, Amal Movement and the three main Christian parties. Beirut Madinati was a platform that emerged from civic protests in the 2015 garbage crisis. Film director Nadine Labaki was one of the 24 candidates of Beirut Madinati. Another list in the fray was the secular 'Citizens in the state' list, led by former minister Charbel Nahhas. Notably Hezbollah did not endorse any municipal council candidates, "preferring to concentrate on other municipalities south of the city."

Just around 20% of the eligible voters cast their ballots. Security was tight at polling stations, with armed forces deployed.

== Results ==
The Beirutis' List defeated Beirut Madinati and swept every single council seat.

List	Candidates	Average votes	%	Seats
Beirutis List (Future, FPM, Amal, LF, Kataeb, ARF)	24	43,095	44.3	24
Beirut Madinati	24	29,353	30.2	0
AICP	1	13,654	14.0	0
MMFD	4	3,532	3.6	0
Beirut List	19	2,560	2.6	0
Al-Beiruti List	12	718	0.7	0
Independents	9			0
Total	93	97,347	100.0	24
Registered voters/turnout		476,021	20.1	
