= Serge Torsarkissian =

Lebanese politician

Serge Torsarkissian (also spelled Tour-Sarkissian) (in Arabic سيرج طورسركيسيان, in Armenian Սերժ Թորսարգիսեան ) is a Lebanese former member of parliament representing the Armenian Catholic seat in Beirut.

He was first elected in 2000 on the list of prime minister Rafic Hariri and is part of the coalition of the nationalist Future Movement, led by the assassinated prime minister's son Saad Hariri. He was re-elected in 2005 and 2009.

== See also ==
- Lebanese Parliament
- Members of the 2009-2013 Lebanese Parliament
