= Michel Pharaon =

Lebanese politician

Minister of State for Planning Affairs
- In office December 2016 – 31 January 2019
- President: Michel Aoun
- Prime Minister: Saad Hariri
- Parliamentary group: Independent

Minister of Tourism
- In office 2014 – December 2016
- Prime Minister: Tammam Salam
- Preceded by: Fadi Abboud
- Succeeded by: Avedis Guidanian

Minister of State for Administrative Reform
- In office 2009–2011
- President: Michel Suleiman
- Prime Minister: Saad Hariri, Najib Mikati, Tammam Salam
- Succeeded by: Mohammad Fneish

Minister of State for Parliamentary Affairs
- In office July 2005 – June 2008
- President: Emile Lahoud
- Prime Minister: Fouad Siniora
- Preceded by: himself

Minister of State for Parliamentary Affairs
- In office October 2000 – April 2003
- President: Emile Lahoud
- Prime Minister: Rafic Hariri

Personal details
- Born: Michel Pharaon; 1959 (age 66–67) Beirut, Lebanon
- Children: 5
- Education: Saint Joseph University, Dauphine University, Paris
- Occupation: Businessman, Pharaon Group
- Website: michelpharaon.org

Michel Pharaon (Arabic: ميشال فرعون) is a Lebanese politician, and was Minister of Tourism in Lebanon. He was the Minister of State for Parliamentary Affairs in the Fouad Siniora government. In the general election held in 2000, he won a seat from Beirut's first district. He ran on the list of late Rafik Hariri.

== Biography ==
Born in Beirut on 24 June 1959, Michel Pharaon received a degree in economics and business administration from St. Joseph University in 1980 before earning an MBA from the University of Paris in 1981. He heads several boards of directors including the Mednet insurance company and the Commerce du Levant magazine. He is the deputy president of the Ruphayil Pharaon and Sons company and of Pharaon Holding . He is a scion of the wealthy and influential Melkite Greek Catholic Pharaon Family, grandnephew of Henri Philippe Pharaoun.

=== Family origins ===
From an eminent Levantine family that originated in the Hauran region of Syria, Michel Pharaon is the son of Pierre (1925-1999), a businessman, deputy and minister, and Nadia Sehnaoui (1933-2013). He is the grand-nephew of Henri Pharaon, one of the leading figures of the Lebanese independence and a symbolic figure of Lebanese public life.

Since the beginning of the 18th century, the Pharaon family has played a prominent role in the life of the Melkite Greek Catholic Church community and was very active in the private and public affairs in the Levant region, also establishing itself in Europe where branches of the family can be traced among Austrian and Italian as well as French nobility (Comtes de / Grafen von Cassis-Faraone).

The origin of the Pharaon Group dates back to 1868, when the two brothers Mikhael and Raphael began their fabric trade in Beirut, specializing in silk and its derivatives: spinning, international trading, banking, coal shipping and insurance. After the World War II, the company diversified into the distribution of domestic gas, household appliances and pharmaceutical products.

=== Professional career ===
In 1982, Michel Pharaon joined the family business. Throughout the years, he acquired an adept knowledge of the various trades of the Group; in addition to insurance, pharmaceuticals, representation of shipping agencies and household appliances, the group created financial holdings and had participations in the economic magazine Le Commerce du Levant and the daily L'Orient–Le Jour as well as in the Lebanese broadcasting corporation.

Michel Pharaon built his career in the insurance industry and in 1989, under his leadership, the insurance company Libano-Suisse was introduced to new markets of the Middle East and Africa. Through acquisitions and mergers, Libano-Suisse soon became through the Delta holding the main shareholder of the Delta insurance company in Jordan and Colina in the Ivory Coast. Colina expanded into West Africa and the Sub-Sahara, together with Mauritius and Madagascar and became the primary insurance group in the CIMA zone. It was sold in 2010.

When in 2011, the Gulf and KSA opened up their insurance market, Libano-Suisse participated in the establishment of the Amana cooperative insurance company. The demand for Islamic Insurance also led the company to establish Takaful Libano-Suisse in Egypt.

Michel Pharaon diversified the group into the health services segment, offering policyholders added value in the health benefits management. In 1991, he co-created Mednet a third-party administration company, later renamed GlobeMed which manages the health coverage of millions of people across Lebanon and the Middle East with operations in more than 12 countries.

Life insurance, bankinsurance, and Pension management were also important growth drivers with the adoption of new technologies and customer procedures.

=== Pharaon Health Care ===
In 1999, Michel Pharaon took over from his father as head of Pharaon Holding, which expanded the Group's pharmaceutical activities in Europe, Central Asia and Africa. Pharaon Healthcare now represents multi-national pharmaceutical companies, whose products it imports, stores, distributes and promotes in those markets in which it operates. The company is also active in several areas of commercial and ports.

=== Political career ===
As an independent, Michel Pharaon was first elected Greek-Catholic Member of Parliament for Beirut in 1996, in an electoral alliance with Prime Minister RaficHariri, of whom he remained an ally over the years. Re-elected MP for Beirut in 2000, with the highest number of votes in the district, his term was renewed in May 2005. In 2009, he led the March 14 Alliance electoral list to a resounding victory in Beirut; his mandate extended to the legislative elections of 2018.

Michel Pharaon was Minister of State for Parliamentary Affairs in the governments of Rafic Hariri in 2000, Fouad Siniora in 2005, and Saad Hariri in 2009. In 2014, he became Minister of Tourism under Tammam Salam, and in 2016 Minister of State for Planning Affairs in Saad Hariri's cabinet. In 2015, he was elected as president of the World Tourism Organization Committee for the Middle East region, twenty-two countries in all, for a two-year period, in recognition of the sustainable development projects initiated as minister. These included the launching of the National Rural tourism strategy in Lebanon, the development of the Religious tourism strategy, the Lebanese diaspora tourism promotion program ANA, the Phoenician Road program developed conjointly with the WTO, and the "Live Love Lebanon" campaigns aiming at advancing a positive image of Lebanon internationally, especially amongst the young.

Michel Pharaon was one of the leading figures and driving forces of the 'Cedar Revolution', which led to the withdrawal of Syrian forces from Lebanon in April 2005, and a prominent figure in the March 14 Alliance. He participated in the Saint Cloud and the Doha conferences, in 2005 and 2008 respectively. He also took part in the Rome and Paris 3 conferences and represented the Greek-Catholic community at the National Dialogue Table which brought together the country's leading political and community leaders for several years.

=== Other mandates ===
Michel Pharaon is a member of the board of directors of the monthly Le Commerce du Levant and the daily L'Orient-Le Jour, and the LBCI.

In 2005, he was elected vice-president of the Greek-Catholic Higher Council and has been re-elected several times to this post.

He is the founder of the popular 'Live Achrafieh' music festival, held every year in Beirut for over ten years.

Michel Pharaon is honorary president of the 'Football Racing Club' of Beirut and, in 2011, founded the club's'Football Academy', which sponsors more than two hundred young players each year.

== Private life ==
Michel Pharaon is father to five children: Laura, Paola and Pierre, from his marriage to Mona Tannous, and Mickaella and Marc Anthony, from his union with Frida Rayes.

He is the youngest of three siblings. His elder sister, Nayla is the wife of Jean de Freige, General manager of Pharaon Holding and the younger, Neda is married to Ali Takieddine.
