= 2015–2016 Lebanese protests =

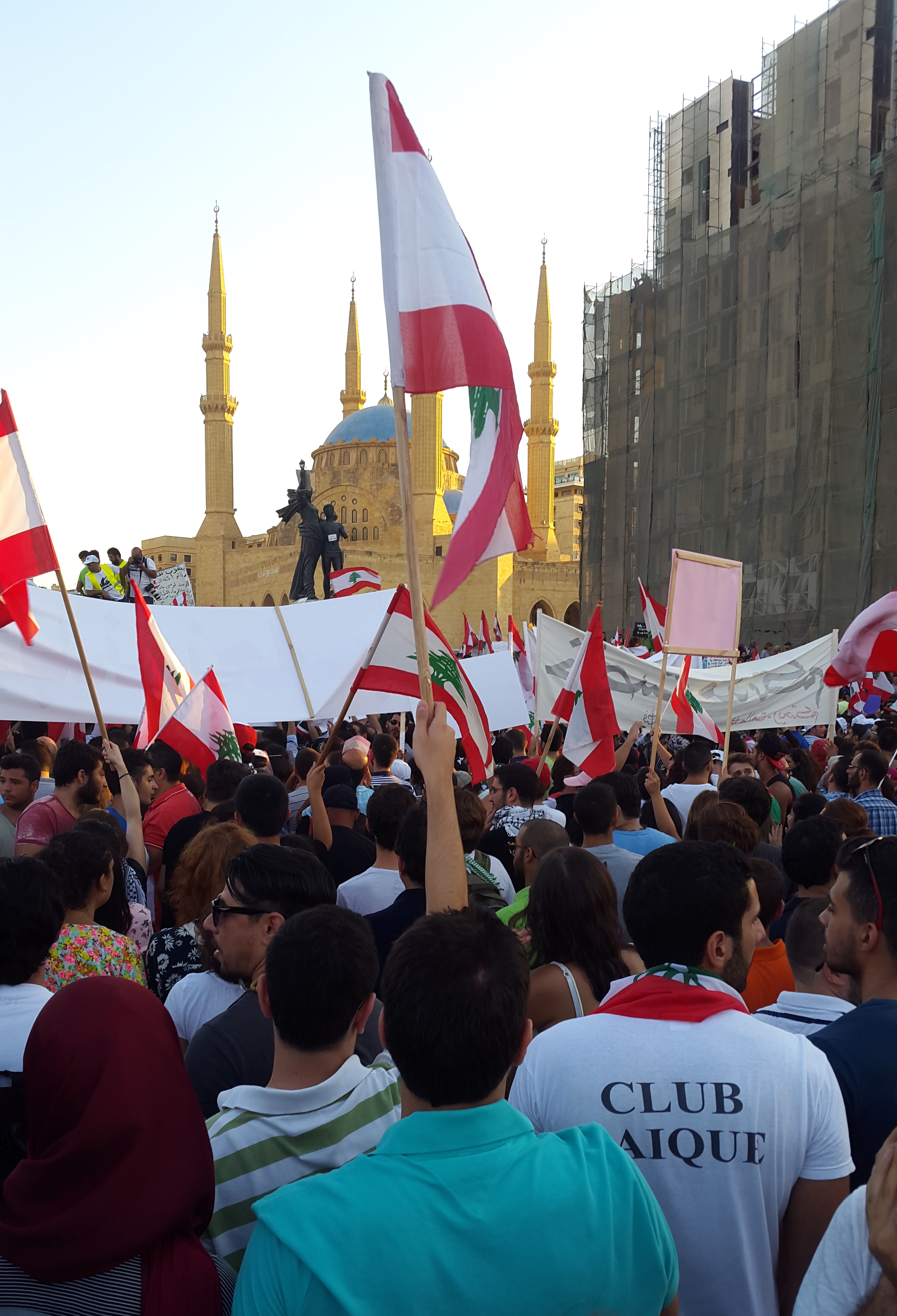
- Martyr Square 29 August 2015
- Date: 21 July 2015 – 2016
- Location: Lebanon
- Caused by: Waste management crisis; Sectarianism; Corruption; Unemployment; Political dysfunction; Power cuts; Water shortages
- Goals: Solve waste management crisis; Proportional Electoral Law; Elect a new parliament; Overthrow the government; Investigation of police brutality; Institutional reforms
- Methods: Civil resistance; Demonstrations; Online activism; Riots; Self-immolation
- Result: Sparked Beirut Madinati campaign; Influenced 2019–2020 Lebanese protests; Raised awareness on corruption and waste mismanagement

Parties
You Stink movement (طلعت ريحتكم); Independent civil society activists; Youth-led coalitions; Environmental advocacy groups; Citizens affected by state dysfunction	Government of Lebanon; Council of Ministers Lebanon; Ministry of Environment (Lebanon); Security Forces; Sectarian political elites

Number
4000 (8 August); 18000 (22 August); 45000 (23 August); 120000 (29 August)	

Casualties and losses
1 killed 402 wounded	31 wounded

The 2015–2016 Lebanese protests, commonly referred to as the "You Stink" movement (Arabic: مظاهرات طلعت ريحتكم ), were a series of mass demonstrations in reaction to a waste management crisis in Lebanon. The closure of the Naameh landfill, which operated beyond its intended capacity since 1997, led to the suspension of garbage collection across Beirut and Mount Lebanon. Trash accumulated in urban areas piled up and public outcry mounted. It startled protests that quickly turned in to a broader movement, in which participators demanded political reform, government accountability and an end of Lebanon's sectarian power-sharing system.

The protests were noted for their non-sectarian and decentralised structure. Participators came from various classes of Lebanese society, challenging political class across confessional lines. Protesters came together through social media and creative forms of expression including satire, visual art, and symbolic performance. Slogans such as "The people want the fall of the regime", were also used during the Arab Spring and were directed at Lebanon's ruling elite.

Although the protests did not immediately lead to institutional reforms, they played a significant role in developing Lebanese contemporary civil society. Multiple civic initiatives, such as the Beirut Madinati campaign in the 2016 Lebanese municipal elections, drew inspiration from the You Stink movement and is seen as a precursor to the 2019 October uprising.

== Background ==
The 2015–2016 Lebanese protests originally occurred because of the failure of Lebanon's centralised waste management system, which had depended since 1997 on a single landfill near Naameh, south of Beirut. The Naameh landfill had an intended capacity of two million tons of garbage, but by the time of its closing in 2015 due to pressure of locals and activists, it had received over 15 million tons of waste. The site closed immediately and without any viable alternatives, it led to a garbage halt by Sukleen, the waste management company responsible for collecting waste in Beirut and Mount Lebanon. Thousands of tons of waste piled up in the streets during the peak of summer, causing environmental and public health risks.

The garbage crisis quickly exposed deeper dysfunctions within the Lebanese state. When the Lebanese Civil War ended in 1990, Lebanon adopted a confessional power-sharing model that distributed political office along sectarian lines, leading to widespread clientelism and weak governance.

By 2015, these dynamics led to consistent crises in basic public services, such as electricity blackouts, worsening of the water infrastructure and an inability to pass a national budget for over a decade. Lebanon had also been without a president since May 2014, leaving executive decisions a state of uncertainty. According to political analyst Marwan Kraidy, the waste crisis functioned as a "biopolitical flashpoint", mobilising Lebanese citizens from different backgrounds and uniting them through their shared concerns and grievances over the inability of the state to manage standard needs like public health. The forming of the "You Stink" movement in July 2015 began out of this moment. Initially it started as a social media campaign demanding the removal of garbage, but it quickly grow into a call for institutional reform.

The movement didn't revolve around a single party or leader- it was led by multiple independent acvtivists, civil society groups and collectives that rejected the sectarian order. Despite being decentralised in character, the protests were unified by its demands for transparency, reforms of political systems and ending institutional corruption. systems. The rhetorics of the 2011 Arab Spring were and inspiration for the "You Stink movement". Protesters adopted slogans and strategies such as "the people want the fall of the regime", and gathering in downtown Beirut's Riad Al Solh Square. During these gatherings, the protesters often performed live music, street performances, political satire and art, reflecting both their anger and creativity.

== Timeline of Events ==
=== July 2015: Landfill Closure and Garbage Accumulation ===
The Naameh landfill, located south of Beirut, was officially closed on the 17th of July in 2015, after years of exceeding its capacity. The Lebanese authorities were not able to put an alternative waste management into action, regardless of prior warnings. Consequently, Sukleen, the private contractor responsible for waste collection in Beirut and Mount Lebanon, ceased operations. Soon garbage began piling up on the streets, raising significant public health and environmental concerns.

=== August 2015: Protests Begin ===
A group of activists launched the "You Stink" movement on social media, as a response to the growing waste crisis. The activists were calling for government accountability and effective waste management solutions. The first major protest took place on 8 August in Beirut's Riad Al Solh Square, attracting several hundred participants.

As the situation worsened, demonstrations intensified. Thousands of people gathered in central Beirut to express their frustration and concerns, on 22 and 23 August. Clashes erupted between protesters and security forces, who used tear gas, water cannons, rubber bullets, and batons to disperse the crowds. The excessive use of force was criticised by human rights organisations, and the events got a lot of widespread media attention.

=== 23 August 2015 demonstration ===
Lebanese army units were deployed in central Beirut after the demonstration degenerated in street fighting between protesters and law enforcement. The Lebanese Red Cross said it treated 402 people in Sunday's protest. About 40 people were taken to hospital. Ambulances ferried out casualties after security forces fired tear gas, rubber bullets and water cannon at demonstrators protesting against what they call Lebanon's "political dysfunction". About 200 youths, some wearing scarves or masks to cover their faces, threw stones and bottles filled with sand at police and tried to pull down security barricades. Some demonstrators burnt fires. A tree next to a church was set ablaze, road signs were pulled from the ground and shop fronts smashed.

The protest, organised by an online group "You Stink!" along with other civil society groups, attracted an estimated 20000 people on the streets of Riad El Solh Square in central Beirut.

By 29 August, more than 100.000 Lebanese took to the streets to manifest against the government's corruption. It began as small protest, but it has soon proved to become an uprising, with many protesters calling for a revolution.

=== September 2015: Escalation and Demands ===
In the beginning of September the protestors of the movement made a list of demands. Investigations into police violence, early parliamentary elections, and the resignation of the Environment Minister were on the list of demands. The movement kept its momentum and internal conflicts arose over tactics and goals. Most of the protests went well and were peaceful, however certain groups called for more radical measures, which now and then resulted in clashes.

=== October–December 2015: Movement Plateaus ===
Protest fatigue, government inaction, and internal activist disputes all contributed to the protest movement's decline by the end of 2015. Limited waste removal efforts were initiated by authorities, for example storing garbage under bridges and in temporary sites. In light of this, a political campaign called Beirut Marinati was launched, with the goal of directing civil engagement into local government.

=== 2016: Institutional Responses and Aftermath ===
In 2016, allegations of corruption and financial and logistical challenges caused the collapse of a proposed waste export plan by the government. Although complete waste management improvement were not put into place, some other landfills were eventually reopened. Even though the intentional goals were not achieved by the "You Stink" movement, their actions had a lasting impact on the civil society in Lebanon and set the stage for future civic mobilisations.

== Role of Women ==
Women had a significant and visible role in the Women in the "You Stink" movement, both participating and organizing. Women were leading marches, coordinating logistics, running social media campaigns and speaking publicly expressing key demands. While it wasn't the first time female activism was seen in Lebanese society, the "You Stink" movement significantly changed how women used their right to protest. They not only defended their own rights, but also protested against violence of the state, institutional corruption and structural patriarchy.

During the protests a unique "civic laboratory" was seen, in which gender norms were actively discussed and challenged, according to political analyst Marwan Kraidy. Female protesters took their place at the frontlines during confrontations with security forces, strategically using their presence and reducing the likelihood of a violent escalation.

Nevertheless, activists also pointed to ongoing challenges. Feminist groups such as the Lebanese Women's Democratic Gathering (RDFL) criticised the limited inclusion of explicitly gender-focused demands in the "You Stink" movement, stating that corruption and sectarianism were intertwined with patriarchy and gender inequality. Political scientist Abbas Assi noted that, while the movement succeeded in various aspects, it did not lead to structural changes for feminist agenda's. Despite these tensions, the visibility and participation of women in the 2015–2016 protests played an important role in laying the groundwork for future feminist activism in Lebanon. Many women who had actively participated in the You Stink movement later became key figures in the October 2019 uprising where activism for gender justice was more integrated into the protests.

== Political Reactions ==
Many people felt that the first reaction of the Lebanese government was insufficient and disconnected. In addition to expressing compassion for the protesters, Prime Minister Tammam Salam denounced the violent events that took place during the rallies on August 22 and 23, 2015. In the days that followed, he publicly admitted that the government was effectively paralyzed and warned that Lebanon was on the verge of collapse unless political consensus could be reached.

During the height of the protests, the Free Patriotic Movement and Hezbollah largely refrained from commenting, while other political actors, including the Kataeb Party and some independent members of parliament, voiced support for the demonstrators’ demands. Interior Minister Nohad Machnouk initially denied reports of excessive force used by police, but later announced an internal investigation after widespread footage of police violence was circulated on social media.

The Speaker of Parliament, Nabih Berri, criticised the protest movement for its lack of workable ideas while acknowledging the gravity of the garbage situation. He argued that genuine reform would have to come through existing parliamentary procedures.

Foreign governments and international organisations made statements as part of the global responses. The United Nations Special Coordinator for Lebanon asked for inclusive dialogue and more response to residents' concerns, while nations like the United States and Germany stressed the importance of protecting the right to protest peacefully.

Even though the protests did not lead to a major structural reformation, they did stimulate some limited official action. The Ministry of Environment initiated a proposal to export waste abroad, but eventually it was put off because of logistical issues and corruption claims.

According to academics, the movement's capacity to bring about significant change was obstructed by the firmly ingrained sectarian framework of Lebanon's political system. However, the protests upset the political establishment and demonstrated the disruptive power of cross-sectarian citizen mobilisation.

== Legacy and Impact ==
2016 VOA report about activist clowns protesting the crisis

The "You Stink" movement had a long lasting impact on the public discourse, protest culture and Lebanon's civil society. Academics and observers often see the protests as a turning point in Lebanese civic involvement, particularly for mobilising cross-sectarian and issue-driven action that directly confronted the country's entrenched sectarian political structure.

One notable outcome of the movement was the creation of Beirut Madinati, an electoral campaign composed of activists, professionals, and independent candidates—many of whom had participated in or were inspired by the protests. In the 2016 municipal elections, the campaign gained widespread support, securing around 40% of the vote despite strong opposition from well-established sectarian political alliances.

Additionally, the movement prepared the ground for the broader wave of nationwide protests known as the 2019–2021 Lebanese protests. As protesters demanded accountability, transparency, and an end to sectarian clientelism in 2019, many of the strategies catchphrases, and personalities from the "You Stink" movement reappeared.

Along with its organisational and political effects, the movement influenced a larger public discussion over governance, corruption, and public service delivery. The waste crisis garnered more media attention. Attention, which aided in the advancement of investigative journalism and civil control of public procurement and spending. Demands for increased transparency and more robust legal frameworks for accountability were stoked by these developments.

In terms of culture, the protests contributed to the acceptance of civil disobedience and open protest as acceptable modes of expression. The movement's protest art, music and satire remained relevant in Lebanese popular culture, particularly among younger generations.

Many people consider the "You Stink" movement to be a noteworthy example of grassroots mobilisation in the Arab area, despite internal conflicts and a slow loss of momentum. In addition to highlighting the potential and constraints of civil society movements functioning inside highly sectarian systems, it signaled a significant change in the Lebanese public's readiness to oppose political elites outside of established party systems.

== See also ==
- 2019–2021 Lebanese protests
- Cedar Revolution
- 2006–2008 Lebanese protests
- 2011 Lebanese protests
- List of protests in the 21st century
