= Paula Yacoubian =

Lebanese politician

Paula Yacoubian بولا يعقوبيان
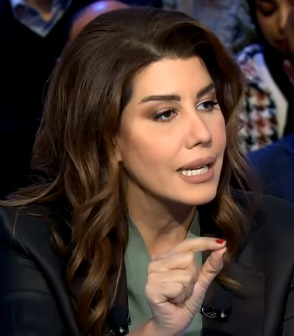
- Yacoubian in 2020

Member of the Lebanese Parliament
- Incumbent
- Assumed office May 21, 2022
- Constituency: Beirut I (2022)
- In office May 7, 2018 – August 8, 2020
- Constituency: Beirut I (2018)

Personal details
- Born: Paulette Siragan Yaghobian; 4 April 1976 (age 50) Beirut, Lebanon
- Children: 1
- Occupation: Politician; journalist; television host

Paulette Siragan Yaghobian (Arabic: بوليت سيراكان ياغوبيان; Armenian: Փոլէթ Սիրական Եագուպեան; born 4 April 1976) is a Lebanese journalist, television host and politician. She worked as a host in a number of Lebanese and pan-Arab international television stations. Known for the transformational impact she's had in her organizations and the broader community, Paula became one of the experts chosen by the World Bank group as a member of their 'External Advisory Panel for Diversity and Inclusion' as a result of her advocacy for women's rights, her efforts for women empowerment, as well as for being a fierce defender of electoral women quota and a fairer electoral law in Lebanon.

In 2018, she announced her candidacy for the 2018 Lebanese Parliamentary Elections, running for the Armenian Orthodox seat in the Beirut I constituency. She was officially announced as a winner following the elections which took place on Sunday 6 May 2018. On 8 August 2020, she resigned and called for a new government after the 2020 Beirut explosion.

== Career ==
Yacoubian started work in June 1995 in ICN (Independent Communications Network), a Lebanese television station founded by Henri Sfeir. Through Sfeir's encouragement, who also had the license for Nida' al Watan newspaper, the then 19-year-old Yacoubian became a celebrity broadcasting news and interviews and appeared frequently in the news broadcasts of the station. She was later assigned as head of the station's regional and international news department and had her own talk news program, Al Sulta al Raabi'a (Arabic: السلطة الرابعة, lit. 'the Fourth Power').

After closure of ICN, Yacoubian moved to LBCI through the station's morning show Nharkon Saeed (Arabic: نهاركم سعيد, lit. 'Good Morning') in addition to presenting the news on the channel's international satellite broadcasts. Then she moved to the Lebanese station MTV where she presented the programme Min al Akhar (من الأخر). She later worked in Arab Radio and Television Network (ART) where she presented a number of programmes on the satellite station's various channels ART al Awael, ART al Munawwaat and ART al Aalamiyyah. Various programmes Yacoubian hosted on ART included Ded al Tayyar (ضد التيار), Liqaa' Khass (لقاء خاص), Roui'ya Waadiha (رؤية واضحة) and Liqaa' min America (لقاء من أمريكا). She moved to Alhurra television based in the United States where her husband Muwaffak Harb ran the pro-American news channel.

Returning to Lebanon, Yacoubian worked in Future TV where she hosted the news talk show Inter-views. She interviewed Lebanese prime minister Saad Hariri in Saudi Arabia in a significant live broadcast direct from Riyadh after Hariri presented his resignation from the Saudi capital amidst rumors about his actual conditions in Saudi Arabia. This interview served in dispelling grave concerns about his status in Saudi Arabia, and included the announcement of his return to Lebanon.

As a humanist/social activist, Paula was successful in launching “Dafa Campaign”, one of the largest and most successful donation campaigns in Lebanon and the Middle East for the second year in a row. "Dafa Campaign" has reached 14,800 underprivileged families in Lebanon in November 2015, 43,000 families in December 2016, and more than 100,000 in 2017.

Paula also offers 15 scholarships for students with outstanding performance who cannot afford their school tuition. On the professional side, Mrs. Yacoubian is also the CEO and General Manager of "Integrated Communications", a company specialized in communications strategy and media relations, as well as public speaking training. She is a certified trainer who attended several training courses and workshops in the US and has a degree in Administration & Political Science. She has been involved with political journalism since the beginning of her career at the age of 17. Yacoubian hosted shows on ICN, LBC, MTV, ART and Future TV. She has interviewed many of the world leaders and personalities and held town hall discussions and debates.

Yacoubian joined efforts with social activists and is running for the Lebanese parliamentary elections that were held in May 2018. On May 7, 2018, she was the first Armenian woman to win a seat in the Lebanese Parliament. Following the 2020 Beirut explosions, she resigned along with two other members of the Kataeb Party on 8 August 2020.

She was again re-elected into the Lebanese parliament after the 2022 parliamentary elections, as part of a 13-member October 17 reformist bloc.

== Personal life ==
Paula Yacoubian is divorced and has a son. She is of Armenian descent and is the daughter of an Armenian genocide survivor.

== Awards ==
Yacoubian received many awards throughout her career, and in August 2017 she received the prominent award of Officer of the Order of the Crown from King Philippe of Belgium, in reward for all the work she has carried out.
