= Ziad Abs =

Lebanese activist

Ziad Abs (زياد عبس)

Personal details
- Born: Ziad Raymond Abs; August 2, 1972 (age 53) Beirut, Lebanon
- Party: FPM until he was expelled in 2016
- Spouse: Aline Germani Abs (m. 2001)
- Children: Jad; Reem
- Education: CTI; AUB
- Occupation: Engineer and Political Activist
- Website: Ziad Abs

Ziad Raymond Abs (زياد ريمون عبس) (born August 2, 1972, in Beirut) is a Beiruti political activist since the early rallies for the liberation of Lebanon in 1989–1990, and a previous member of the Lebanese political party Free Patriotic Movement (Lebanon). For the past 15 years, he has devoted most of his time and energy to serve Beirut and its citizens. Joining the march of former Lebanese Army Commander (1984–1988) and Prime Minister (1988–1990) General Michel Aoun (GMA), he managed, between 1990 and 2005, several responsibilities in the Free Patriotic Movement. He was a candidate to the Parliamentary Greek Orthodox seat in Beirut during both the 2018 and 2022 elections. The FPM expelled him from the party alongside other party partisans on Friday 29 July 2016, allegedly charged with raising the FPM's crises in the media and for rebelling against movement decisions. He is also the founder of LOGOS association, founding member of TRACS, and head of Achrafieh Youth Club (AYC).

After 2016, he continued his activism as part of the civil society movements, and co-founded ReLebanon political group that has been active since the October 17th uprising in 2019.

== Biography ==
=== Background and career ===
Abs is an electrical engineer and CEO of Moonlight Architectural Solutions (MAS Group) in Doha and Beirut since 1998. He is also the CEO of Petroserv SAL in Beirut since 2012. He is the founder of LOGOS Association, a non-profit Organization acting since 2009 on social & cultural manners linked to the city of Beirut, and the president of Achrafieh Youth Club (AYC) participating since 2015 in several sports activities. He also served in 2012 as the President of the Board of Trusties for the Sagesse Basketball Club, contributing to the support and success of the Team and putting the plan for the club's growth in the upcoming years.

Ziad is also a founding member, and the driving force behind TRACS, an NGO aiming to create a positive change on sustainable transportation and mobility issues.
