= Misbah El-Ahdab =

Lebanese politician

Misbah El-Ahdab (Arabic: مصباح الأحدب), born on April 1, 1962, in Tripoli, Lebanon, is a Lebanese politician and a former MP representing Tripoli in the Lebanese Parliament. He was elected to parliament in 1996 and re-elected in the legislative elections of 2000 and 2005.

El-Ahdab holds a bachelor's degree in Business Administration from European Business School Paris and a degree in Economics from London School of Economics. He is vice-president and co-founder of the cross-confessional Democratic Renewal Movement. He is also President of the Lebanese-Italian Friendship Association.

== Lebanese protests ==
On October 18, 2019, El-Ahdab attempted to participate in a people's protest held in Tripoli. Widespread protests were erupting in Lebanon due to economic and political instability (see 2019–20 Lebanese protests). The protesters vehemently denied El-Ahdab participation in a people's movement against all politicians, and began throwing plastic and glass bottles at him and his convoy. Two of El-Ahdab's bodyguards returned fire with assault rifles, injuring several protestors. No one was killed, despite rumors circulating that two people were killed.
