= Beirut III (2009) =

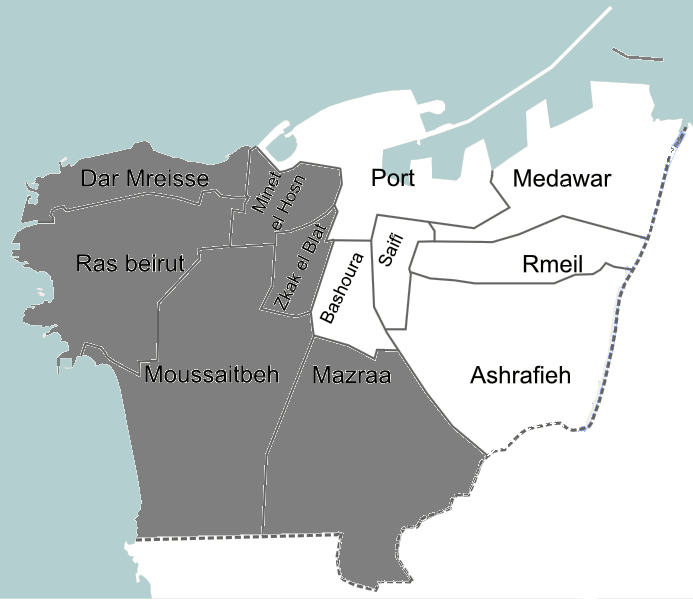
Beirut III constituency boundary, covering 6 neighbourhoods in western Beirut

Beirut III (Arabic: دائرة بيروت الثالثة) was an electoral district in Lebanon. It covered six neighbourhoods (quartiers) in the western parts of the capital; Dar El Mreisse, Mazraa, Minet El Hosn, Moussaitbeh, Ras Beirut and Zuqaq al-Blat. The constituency elected ten members of the Parliament of Lebanon; five Sunni Muslim, one Shia Muslim, one Druze, one Protestant, one Greek Orthodox and one Minorities (for more information on the Lebanese electoral system, see Elections in Lebanon). The constituency was created with the 2008 Doha Agreement, ahead of the 2009 parliamentary election.

== Creation ==
The boundaries and the sectarian seat allocation of the electoral district were defined by the 2008 Doha Agreement, which instituted election districts similar to those of the 1960 Election Law.

== Demographics ==
The Ministry of Interior and Municipalities reported in 2011 that the constituency had 256,933 registered voters and the following religious composition: 65.25% Sunni Muslims, 14.21% Shia Muslims, 6.27% Greek Orthodox and 3.18% Minorities. According to an article in Nahar newspaper published in May 2008, Beirut III had 172,756 Sunni voters, 38,052 Shias, 17,993 Greek Orthodox, 8,882 Minorities, 5,786 Maronites, 5,425 Armenian Orthodox, 4,735 Druze, 3,054 Protestants and 1,153 Armenian Catholics. It had the second-largest number of registered voters of all electoral districts in the country (after Baalbek-Hermel) and the largest number of Sunni Muslim voters.

== 2009 election ==
During the 2009 election there were 252,301 registered voters in Beirut III.

=== March 8 list ===
The opposition 'National Decision of Beirut' list was announced on May 17, 2009 at a press conference at the Safir Helipolitan Hotel in Raouche. The list consisted of Ibrahim al-Halabi, Bahaaeddine Itani, Khaled al-Daouk, Omar Ghandour and Sheikh Abdel-Nasser al-Jabri for the Sunni seats, Rafiq Nasrallah (Shia), Ghazi al-Mounzer (Druze), Najah Wakim (Greek Orthodox), George Ishkhanian (Protestant) and Raymond Asmar (Minorities).

The People's Movement had declared Wakim and Al-Halabi as its candidates at a press conference on April 2, 2009. Separately, Itani had declared his candidature on the same day. The Armenian Revolutionary Federation declared George Ishkhanian as its candidate for the Protestant seat on April 10, 2009. Ishkhanian was a businessman, board member of the First Armenian Evangelical Church and chairman of the Armenian Evangelical Youth Union.

=== March 14 list ===
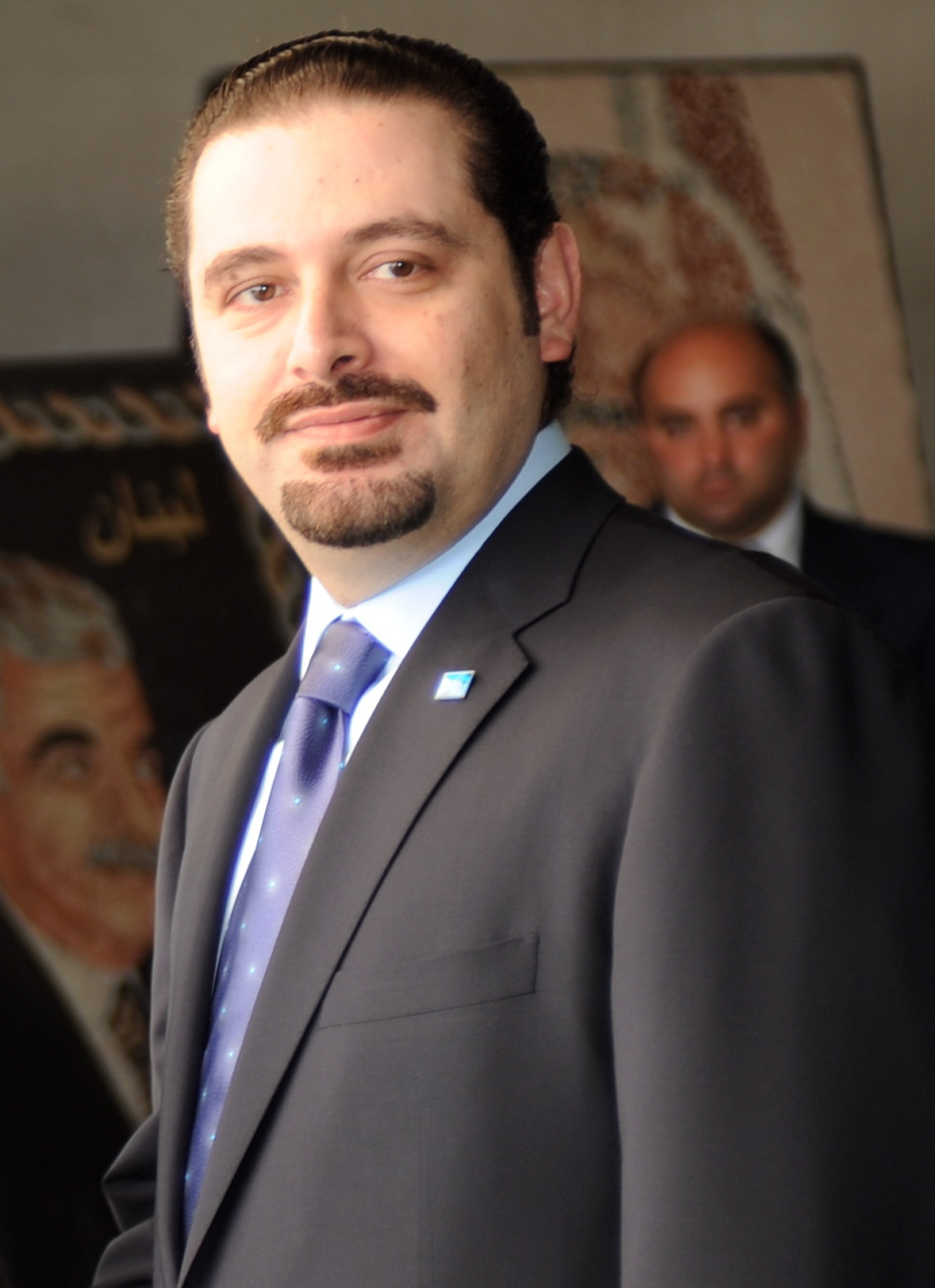
Saad Hariri

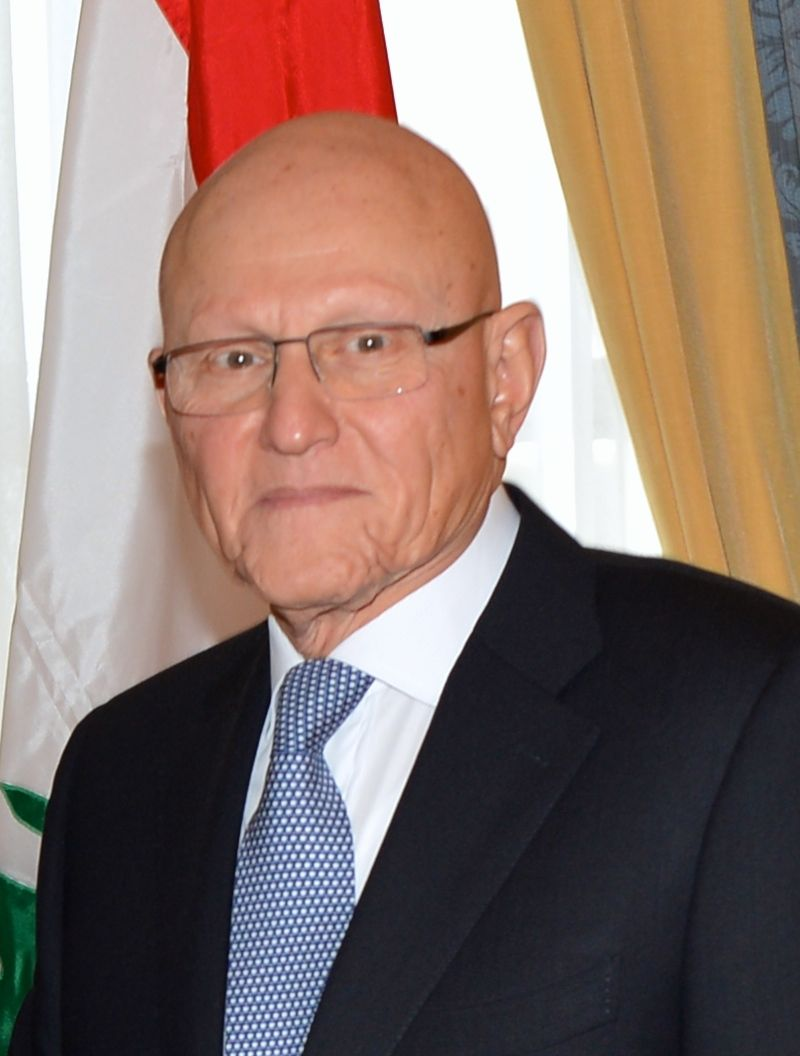
Tamam Salam

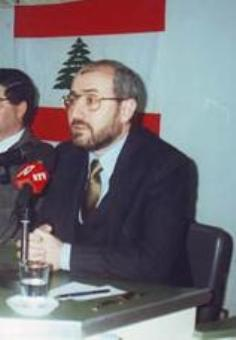
Ghazi Aridi

The March 14 Alliance list was announced by Saad Hariri at the Al Manara Stadium on May 8, 2009. The candidates of the list were: Hariri, Tamam Salam, Mohammad Qabbani, Ammar Houri and Imad Houth for the Sunni seats, Ghazi Aridi for the Druze seat, Ghazi Yusuf for the Shia seat, Bassem Chab for the Protestant seat, Atef Majdalani for the Greek Orthodox seat and Nabil de Freije for the Minorities seat.

=== Voting ===
103,243 voters cast their votes in Beirut III (40.92%). All ten candidates of the March 14 list were elected with wide margins. The March 14 list got the overwhelming support from the Sunni and Druze communities, as well as most of the Christian vote. The March 8 list won the overwhelming support from the Shia voters.

Out of 4,900 Jewish registered voters, only five voted. All of them voted for the March 14 list.

| Seat | March 14 candidates | | | March 8 candidates | | |
|---|---|---|---|---|---|---|
| Druze | Ghazi Aridi (Progressive Socialist) | 76,792 | 74.38% | Ghazi Mundhar | 20,680 | 20.20% |
| Evangelical | Bassem Chab (Future Movement) | 76,133 | 74.11% | George Ishkhanian (Tashnaq) | 21,041 | 20.38% |
| Greek Orthodox | Atef Majdalani (Future Movement) | 77,6510 | 74.74% | Najah Wakim (People's Movement) | 21,921 | 21.23% |
| Minorities | Nabil de Freije (Future Movement) | 76431 | 74.03% | Raymond Asmar | 21,362 | 20.69% |
| Shia | Ghazi Yusuf | 72,410 | 70.14% | Rafiq Nasrallah | 22,177 | 21.48% |
| Sunni | Saad Hariri (Future Movement) | 78382 | 75.92% | Omar Ghandour | 21,703 | 21.02 |
| Sunni | Tamam Salam | 76,925 | 74.51% | Bahaaeddine Itani | 21,507 | 20.83% |
| Sunni | Mohammad Qabbani (Future Movement) | 76,448 | 74.05% | Abdel-Nasser al-Jabri | 21,103 | 20.44% |
| Sunni | Ammar Houri (Future Movement) | 76,201 | 73.81% | Khaled al-Daouk | 21,100 | 20.44% |
| Sunni | Imad Hout (Jama'a) | 75,954 | 73.59% | Ibrahim al-Halabi (People's Movement) | 21,050 | 20.38% |

Apart from the March 8 and March 14 candidates, the most voted candidate was Greek Orthodox Bechara Merhej who got 1,517 (1.49%). Other candidates were Ghazi Khamis (Sunni, 472 votes), Zuheir Khatib (Shia, 314 votes), Salah Araqji (Sunni, 236 votes), Edmond Pauls Boutrous (Minorities, 210 votes), Fadi Romi (Greek Orthodox, 195 votes) and a number of candidates who got less than a 100 votes each. There were 991 blank votes and 705 invalid ballots.

== 2017 Vote Law ==
As per the new Vote Law adopted by parliament on June 16, 2017, the electoral districts of Beirut were reorganized. The erstwhile Beirut III district merged with the Port and Bachoura quarters (previously in Beirut II), and formed a district henceforth known as 'Beirut II'. Whilst one Sunni and one Shia seats was added from the old Beirut II district, the Minorities seat shifted to the Christian-dominated Beirut I district.
