= Antoine Pano =

Lebanese politician and retired general

Antoine Pano (Arabic: أنطوان بانو), born in Beirut on 10 November 1952, is a Lebanese politician and retired general in the Lebanese Armed Forces and special forces.

He represented the Free Patriotic Movement for the parliamentary elections, and won election on May 6, 2018.

He was a member of the Strong Lebanon bloc in the Parliament of Lebanon representing the minorities for the Beirut I area
