= Nicolas Sehnaoui =

Lebanese politician

- نقولا صحناوي
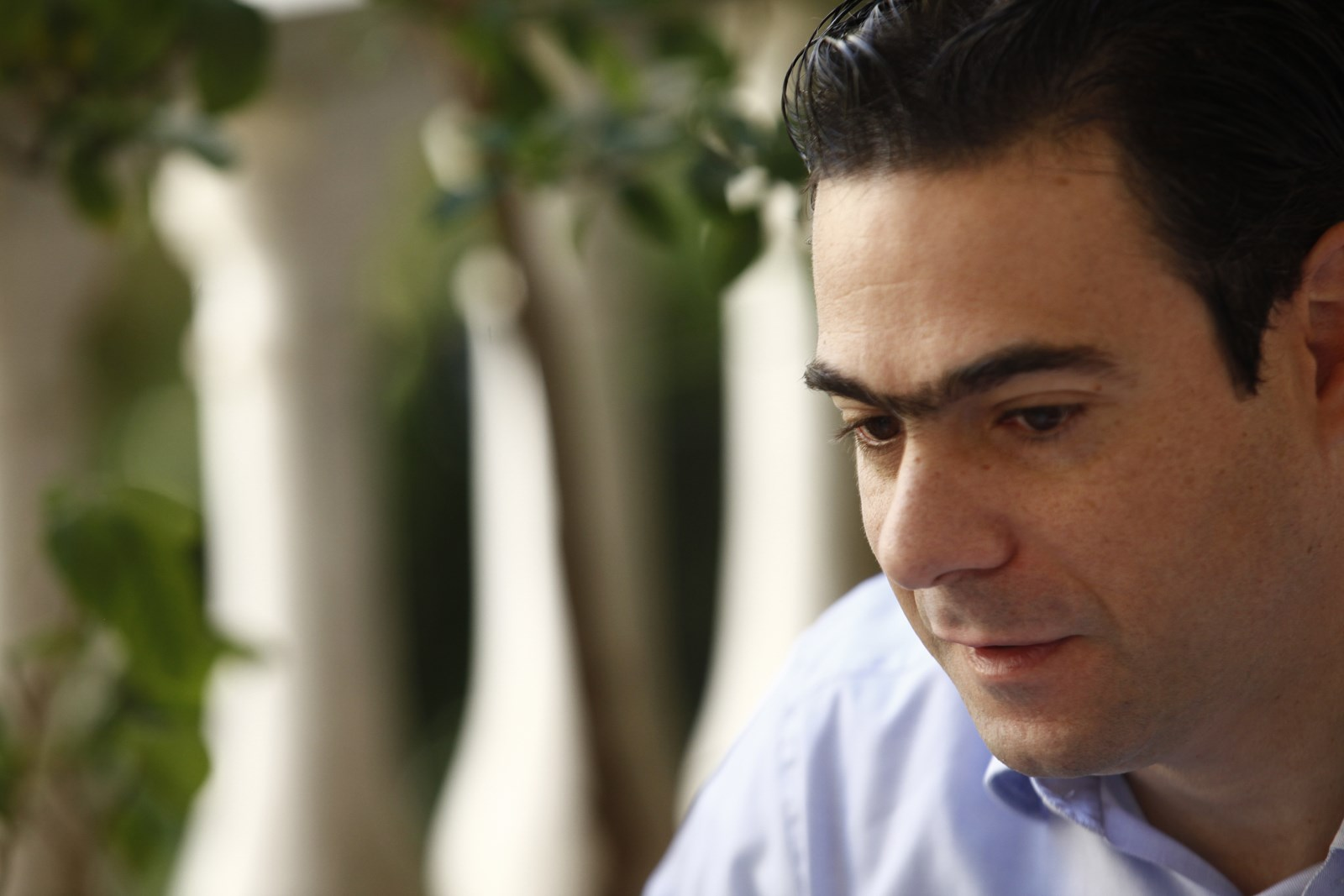

Member of the Lebanese Parliament
- Incumbent
- Assumed office 15 May 2018
- Constituency: Beirut I (2018, 2022)

Minister of Telecommunications
- In office 13 June 2011 – 15 February 2014
- President: Michel Sleiman
- Prime Minister: Najib Mikati
- Preceded by: Charbel Nahas
- Succeeded by: Boutros Harb

Personal details
- Born: 23 April 1967 (age 59) Beirut, Lebanon
- Spouse: Paula Naim
- Relations: Maurice Sehnaoui aka Bagera (Father) Khalil Sehnaoui (Cousin) Mouna Bassili Sehnaoui (Aunt) Antoun Sehnaoui (Cousin)
- Education: Panthéon-Assas University, ESCP Europe
- Website: Nicolas Sehnaoui's Official website

Nicolas Maurice Sehnaoui (Arabic: نقولا موريس صحناوي; born 23 April 1967) is a Lebanese politician and member of the Strong Lebanon bloc in the Lebanese parliament.

== Early life and education ==
Sehnaoui was born in Beirut, to parents Maurice Sehnaoui and Mouna Bustros, on 23 April 1967 and grew in the Achrafieh a Beirut neighborhood. He attended Grand Lycee Franco-Libanais following which he earned a BA in Economics from Panthéon-Assas University and an MBA from ESA Beirut.

== Career ==
In 2000, Sehnaoui became chairman of the board of Sogecap, a leading life insurance company and in 2004, chairman of the board of Sogelease Liban a financial leasing firm. He held both positions until early 2008. Since 1996, he has been a board member of Sehnaoui Plant a regional construction equipment distribution company.

Sehnaoui served as the Minister of Telecommunications of the Republic of Lebanon between June 2011 and February 2014. Under his leadership, the Ministry of Telecommunications (1) upgraded antiquated copper backbone to fiber optics and DWDM latest technologies with plans ready for FTTC and FTTB, (2) replaced ancient EDGE cellular networks with 3G across the country and 50 Mbit/s 4G LTE in greater Beirut, (3) and increased Lebanon's international bandwidth tenfold via IMEWE whilst securing redundancy through participation in the Alexandros submarine cable; all while reducing internet & mobile costs by over 80%. By June 2013, with the infrastructure well on its way to recovery, Sehnaoui turned his attention to Lebanon's knowledge economy, more specifically its digital economy: he created Beirut Angels – Lebanon's 1st tech startup angel network – and actively supported the creation of Banque du Liban Circular 331 – a groundbreaking US$400 million equity investment guarantee initiative that transformed Lebanon's banks into VC-oriented institutions. Sehnaoui is now leading Lebanon's Digital Roadmap Steering Committee to ensure the successful implementation of BDL C331. All these efforts where measured & confirmed by the United Nations International Telecommunication Union that ranked Lebanon 1st in progress out of 157 countries in the 2012 ICT Development Index (IDI). Prior to taking office, Sehnaoui successfully managed several companies across a variety of industries. Sehnaoui is a strong advocate of a secular political system although his rhetoric has been described as highly sectarian.

Beginning in 2011 and under Sehnaoui's management, Lebanon has witnessed significant infrastructure upgrade investments, mainly, deployment of a 4,700 km fiber-optic network linking all telecom exchanges, purchase of 25% of the Alexandros submarine cable capacity (multiplying Lebanon's international capacity 14-fold), launch of both 3G and 4G mobiles networks and a major increase of Internet speeds (15-fold for the fixed network with an ~80% price decrease and 18-fold for the mobile network with a ~88% price decrease). In 2011, Lebanon was included among 10 countries that witnessed the greatest rank improvement according to the IDI moving up three spots globally and ranking sixth regionally.

In 2018, Nicolas Sehnaoui was elected as Member of Parliament for the Beirut I District. In 2022, Nicolas Sehnaoui was re-elected as Member of Parliament for the Beirut I District.

== Activism ==
=== Politics ===
In 1991, and alongside Georges Corm, Borhane Alaouie, Karim Kobeissi and Abdel Rahman Ghandour, Sehnaoui co-founded the Lebanese Citizen's Movement that militates for a secular Lebanon. Between 91 and 95 the movement published a monthly magazine, ‘Al Mouaten’ (directly translated as ‘the citizen’), in both Arabic and French and produced a short movie titled ‘If the People One Day’ which calls for the organization of a war tribunal to judge war crimes committed during the Lebanese Civil War. The Minister has also founded the Free Patriotic Economic Committee which he headed between 2005 and 2011. He is now the Vice President of the Free Patriotic Movement for Political Affairs.

After the 2020 Beirut explosion, Sehnaoui claimed that the tragedy might have been orchestrated to push more Christians out of Lebanon.

Political offices
| Preceded by Charbel Nahas | Minister of Telecommunications; 2011–2014 | Succeeded by Boutros Harb |
