= Beirut II (2009) =

Parliamentary constituency in Lebanon

- Former constituency for the Parliament of Lebanon
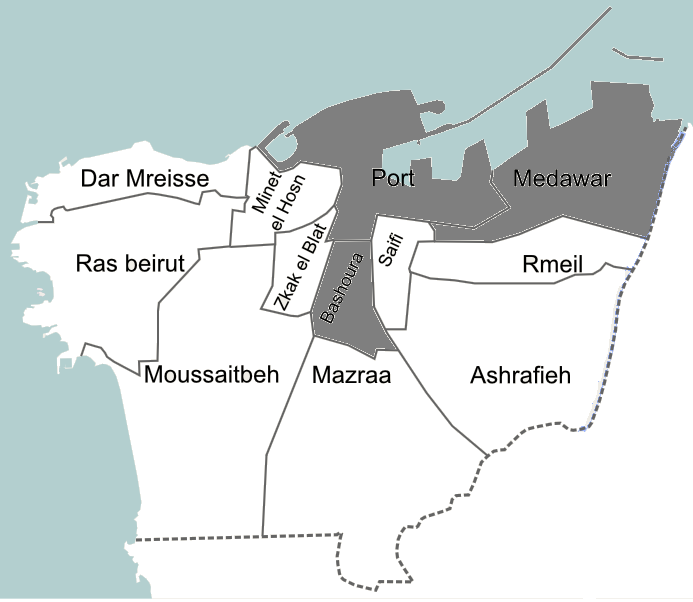
- Governorate: Beirut
- Electorate: 102,569 (2011)

Former constituency
- Created: 2008
- Abolished: 2017
- Number of members: 4 (2 Armenian Orthodox, 1 Sunni, 1 Shia)

Beirut II (Arabic: دائرة بيروت الثانية) was a parliamentary constituency in Lebanon. It covered three neighbourhoods (quartiers) in the north-eastern parts of the capital; Port, Medawar and Bachoura. The constituency elected four members of the National Assembly. Two of the Beirut II MPs had to be Armenian Orthodox, 1 Sunni Muslim and 1 Shia Muslim (for more information on the Lebanese electoral system, see Elections in Lebanon). The constituency was created with the 2008 Doha Agreement, ahead of the 2009 parliamentary election.

== Demographics ==
The Ministry of Interior and Municipalities reported in 2011 that the constituency had 102,569 voters and the following religious composition: 31.22% Sunni Muslims, 26.37% Shia Muslims, 25.25% Armenian Orthodox, 3.44% other Christian Minorities, 3.42% Maronites and 3.35% Armenian Catholics. Beirut II had the highest percentage of Armenian registered voters of all parliamentary constituencies.

== 2009 election ==
Ahead of the 2009 polls the two main contenders the March 8 and the March 14 alliances, had agreed in Doha to divide the Beirut II seats between them. Per the Doha Agreement the opposition would get the Shia seat, the majority the Sunni seat and the Armenian seat would be split between the two. At the time of the 2009 elections the constituency had 101,787 registered voters, out of whom 27,787 cast their votes. Its 27.3% electoral participation was the lowest amongst the constituencies around the country (the national average was 50.7%). There were 450 invalid ballots and 315 blank votes. Voting in Beirut II was largely calm.

=== Armenian seats in the 2009 election ===
Two Armenian Orthodox candidates were elected unopposed; Sebouh Kalpakian and Arthur Nazarian. Kalpakian had served as the chairman of the Lebanon Executive Board of the Hunchnak Party for thirteen years. He had left this position and emigrated to Australia, but ahead of the 2009 polls he returned to Lebanon to run for parliament. Nazarian was the candidate of the Armenian Revolutionary Federation ('Tashnaqs'). The Ministry of Interior and Municipalities declared Kalpakian and Nazarian elected unopposed on April 22, 2009.

=== Shia seat in the 2009 election ===
For the Shia seat there were two candidates; Hani Kobeissy and Abbas Yaghi. The March 14 alliance did not field any Shia candidate, as per the agreement between the Amal Movement and Future Movement in Doha. On April 22, 2009, the Hizbullah candidate and incumbent parliamentarian Amin Sherri officially withdrew from the race, in favour of the Amal candidate Kobeissy. According to media sources this move was done on behalf of Hizbullah in order to ease tensions between Amal and the Free Patriotic Movement over candidatures in Jezzine and Baabda. In the end Kobeissy won the seat with a wide margin, obtaining 15,126 votes against 195 for Yaghi.

=== Sunni seat in the 2009 election ===
The main contenders for the Sunni seat were Nouhad Machnouk of the Future Movement and Adnan Arakji from the March 8 alliance. Although the March 8 and March 14 alliances had agreed in Doha that the Sunni seat would go to the March 14 alliance Arakji refused to step down from the race, causing a degree of controversy. Initially Hizbullah had declared that it would support neither Machnouk nor Arakji. But just a few days ahead of the polls the party declared that it would call for a vote for Machnouk, as per the Doha Agreement. According to the newspaper al-Hayat, the shift in the Hizbullah position came after pressure from the Qatari Prime Minister/Foreign Minister Hamad bin Jassim bin Jaber Al Thani. Machnouk won the seat with a wide margin obtaining 16,583 votes, Adnan Arakji finishing second with 8,071 votes, Mohieddine Majbour obtained 231 votes and Jalal Kebrit a mere 10 votes.

== 2017 Vote Law ==
As per the new Vote Law adopted by parliament on June 16, 2017, the electoral districts of Beirut were reorganized. The erstwhile Beirut II district was split, with the Medawar quartier and the two Armenian Orthodox seats going to the Christian-dominated Beirut I district. Port, Bachoura and the two Muslim seats merged into the Muslim-dominated Beirut III district (henceforth known as 'Beirut II').
