= Jean Talouzian =

Lebanese politician

Member of the Parliament of Lebanon
- Incumbent
- Assumed office 2018

Personal details
- Born: Achrafieh, Beirut, Lebanon
- Political party: Independent

Jean Arshak Talouzian (Arabic: جان أرشاك طالوزيان) is a Lebanese politician who has served as a member of the Parliament of Lebanon since 2018, in a seat reserved for members of the Armenian Catholic Church. He is an independent who has sat with the Lebanese Forces and Strong Republic parliamentary blocs.

Born in Achrafieh, Talouzian was educated at Saint Joseph University of Beirut and served in the military, where he rose to become a brigadier general. In the 2018 election he was elected to parliament as part of the Beirut First list.

== Early life ==
Jean Arshak Talouzian was born in Achrafieh, Beirut. He was educated at military schools and Saint Joseph University of Beirut. He served as a brigadier general in the military and is a member of the Armenian Catholic Church.

== Career ==
In the 2018 and 2022 elections Talouzian was elected as an independent candidate from a seat reserved for members of the Armenian Catholic Church in the Governorates of Lebanon. In 2018, he sat with 14 other members of the Lebanese Forces parliamentary bloc, but later joined the Strong Republic bloc. In the 2018 election he was a member of the Beirut First list, which was supported by the Lebanon Forces, Kataeb Party, Ramgavar, and multiple independents.

During Talouzian's tenure in parliament he supported Najib Mikati for prime minister in 2025. He voted to grant confidence in Joseph Aoun as President of Lebanon. He was one of the leaders of a delegation of members of parliament that met with Pope Francis in Vatican City in 2018.

== Works cited ==
=== News ===
- ""لقاء استثنائي" بين البابا فرنسيس والوفد اللبناني في الفاتيكان". IMLebanon. 20 November 2018. Archived from the original on 23 June 2025.
- "طالوزيان:ليبقى الوطن والمواطن نحن هنا اليوم". Lebanon Debate. 25 March 2018. Archived from the original on 23 June 2025.
- "دائرة بيروت الأولى: معركة مارونية على أرض ارثوذكسية بأموال كاثوليكية". IMLebanon. 13 March 2018. Archived from the original on 23 June 2025.
- "MP Jean Talouzian grants confidence to Lebanon's government under President Aoun". Lebanese Broadcasting Corporation International. 26 February 2025. Archived from the original on 23 June 2025.
- "MP Talouzian names Najib Mikati for premiership". National News Agency. 13 January 2025.
- "Reception in Honor of Lebanon's Newly Elected MP General Jean Talouzian". Armenian General Benevolent Union. 29 May 2018. Archived from the original on 23 June 2025.
- "Six Armenians in Lebanon's new Parliament". 1Lurer. 17 May 2022. Archived from the original on 23 June 2025.
- "Six Armenians Win Parliamentary Seats as Lebanese Elections Weaken Hezbollah". The Armenian Mirror-Spectator. 17 May 2022. Archived from the original on 23 June 2025.
- Azar, Georgi (8 May 2018). "Breakdown of Lebanon's new parliament". An-Nahar. Archived from the original on 23 June 2025.

=== Web ===
- "طالوزيان: نحن أمام استحقاقٍ تاريخي". Lebanese Forces. 13 May 2020. Archived from the original on 23 June 2025.
- "جان أرشاك طالوزيان". Parliament of Lebanon. Archived from the original on 23 June 2025.
