= Sebouh Kalpakian =

Lebanese Armenian politician

Sebouh Kalpakian is a Lebanese Armenian politician. Kalpakian served as the chairman of the Lebanon Executive Board of the Social Democrat Hunchakian Party for thirteen years. However, he left this position and emigrated to Australia, but ahead of the 2009 Lebanese general election he returned to Lebanon to run for parliament. The Ministry of Interior and Municipalities declared Kalpakian elected unopposed on 22 April 2009.
