= Beirut Madinati =

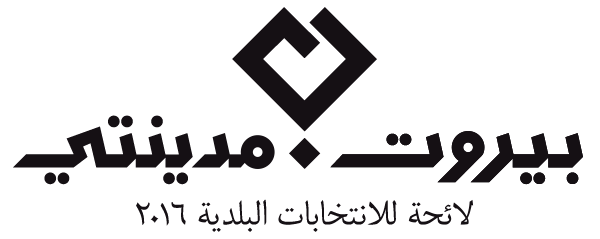
- Founded: September, 2015
- Headquarters: Badaro, Beirut, Lebanon
- Website: https://beirutmadinati.com/

Beirut Madinati (Beirut My City) is a volunteer-led political campaign that emerged in April 2016 to run in 8 May 2016 Beirut municipality elections and in the 2022 Lebanese general elections. The campaign launched from the 2015–16 Lebanese protests as a reaction to power and water shortages, streets filled with trash, and a dizzying urban infrastructure.

It built its campaign around a 10-point program where it promised to work on (1) mobility, (2) greenery and public spaces, (3) affordable housing, (4) waste management, (5) natural heritage, (6) community spaces and services, (7) socio-economic development, (8) environmental sustainability, (9) health and safety, and (10) municipal governance. Beirut Madinati, bases its core values as being the primacy of the public good, social justice, transparency, and stewardship of their city for future generations.

During the 2016 Beirut municipal election, Beirut Madinati won one of the three Beirut electoral districts, but lost the overall elections with 40% against the 'Beirutis' list' supported by Saad Hariri, and included politicians from both the 14 March Alliance and the 8 March Alliance, a coalition of traditionally fierce opponents. Beirut Madinati took more than 50% of the votes in the Christian district of East Beirut; it took more than a third of the vote in Hariri's traditional turf of the Sunni Muslim neighbourhoods, which signaled a shift in local politics of Beirut according to Turkish political analyst Mahmutcan Ateş.
