= Cabinet of Tammam Salam =

Government of Lebanon (2014–2016)

- Cabinet of Lebanon

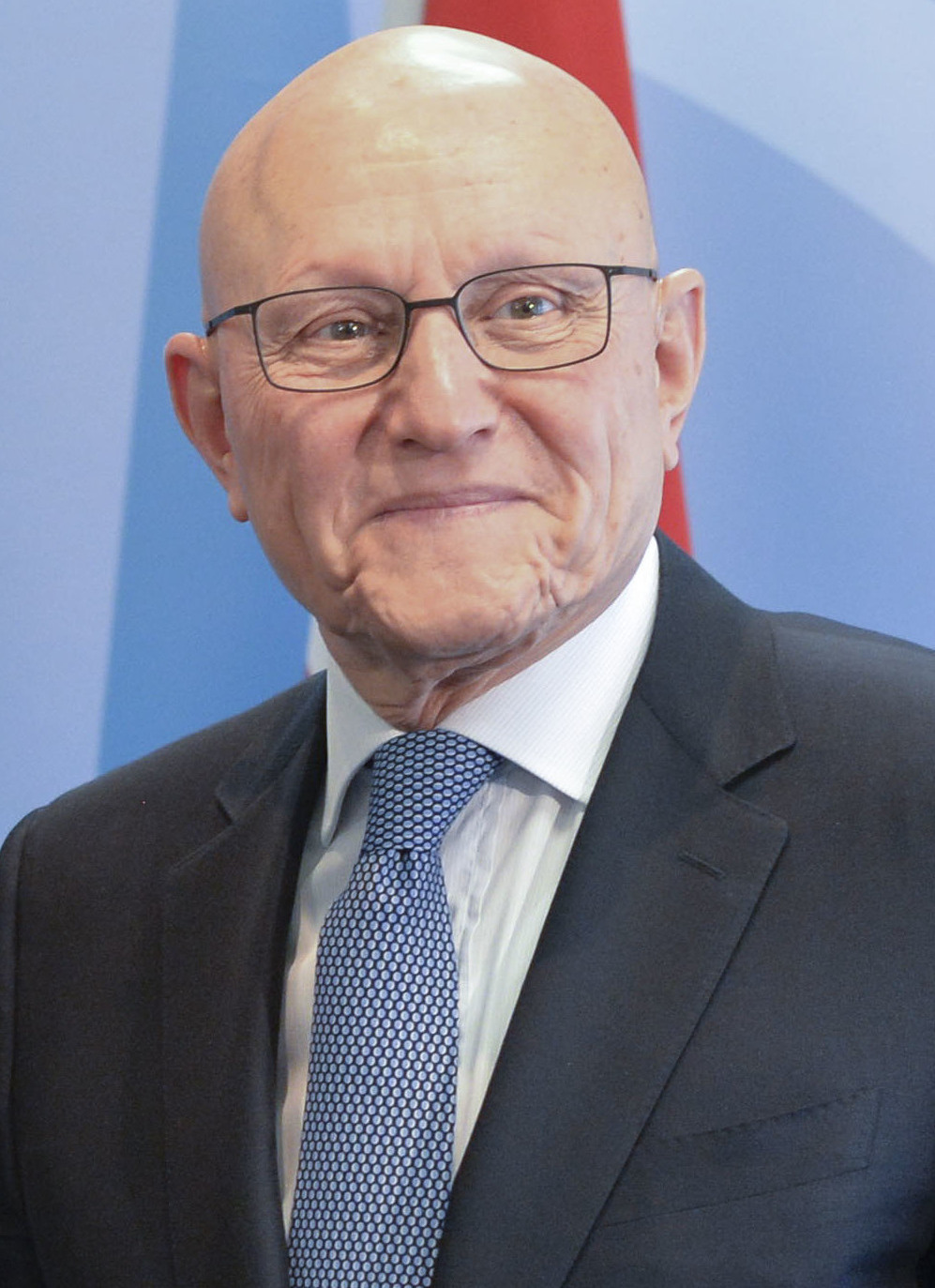
- Tammam Salam
- Date formed: 15 February 2014
- Date dissolved: 18 December 2016

People and organisations
- President: himself
- Head of government: Tammam Salam
- Deputy head of government: Samir Moqbel
- No. of ministers: 24
- Total no. of members: 24

History
- Predecessor: Second Cabinet of Najib Mikati
- Successor: Second Cabinet of Saad Hariri

The formation of a new government led by Tammam Salam followed two weeks of negotiations after the resignation of Najib Mikati's government. Salam's candidacy was backed by the March 14 Alliance, the Progressive Socialist Party, Najib Mikati and the Amal Movement.

The government would be the sixth one designated to oversee parliamentary elections since Lebanon's independence in 1943 takes place (the previous five governments designated for such purpose were: the one formed in 1964 lasted for two months; 1960 and 2005 lasted for three months; 1951 and 1953 for four). Although, finally, parliamentary elections of 2014 were postponed; shutdown of the Cabinet of Tammam Salam (in December 2016) had happened before the parliamentary elections in Lebanon (in May 2018) really took place. A national unity government was announced on 15 February 2014. Despite his nomination by 124 of 128 MPs, Salam then failed to form a consensus government amidst political demands. Salam finally announced his proposed cabinet that included members from the March 8 and March 14 alliances, as well as independents on 15 February 2014.

== Background ==
The Mikati government fell after Najib Mikati's resignation on 22 March 2013 over his attempt in 2013 to form a committee to oversee the next general election in opposition to Free Patriotic Movement (FPM), Hezbollah and Amal Movement ministers, as well as an attempt to extend the term of Major General Ashraf Rifi, the head of the Internal Security Forces (ISF), who was scheduled to retire in April, due to a mandatory age limit.

== Nomination of Tammam Salam ==
Tammam Salam's emergence as the consensus candidate followed discussion in Saudi Arabia and also had the backing of March 14, Mikati and Amal. PSP leader Walid Jumblatt also supported him saying: "Salam is the voice of moderation... He’s never said a bad word against the resistance." Former Prime Minister Fouad Siniora also said that he was a "unanimous" choice because of his "national and moral engagement. We wish Mr. Salam good luck in leading the country through the present circumstances." Salam then said: "It’s a great national responsibility...I thank my brothers in the March 14 coalition." On 6 April, he got 124 of the 128 parliamentary votes to become prime minister and was consequently tasked by President Michel Suleiman to form a government.

Salam reacted in saying: "There is a need to bring Lebanon out of its state of division and political fragmentation, as reflected on the security situation, and to ward off the risks brought by the tragic situation in the neighbouring [Syria] and by regional tensions." He also said that he intends to form a national unity government instead of a partisan one saying that "the consensus around my nomination is the biggest proof of the intention of political forces to save the country." Future Movement leader Saad Hariri had said that he was willing to share power with Hezbollah if the cabinet formation deadlock was ended while Hezbollah abandoned a demand that it and its allies be given veto power in the new cabinet.

== Government formation ==
On 15 February 2014, Salam announced a national unity government of 24 ministers, including March 8 and March 14 alliances, and independents. UN Secretary-General Ban Ki-moon and the European Union's High Representative of the Union for Foreign Affairs and Security Policy Catherine Ashton welcomed the formation of the government. While Salam said the government would "strengthen national security and stand against all kinds of terrorism" and face the social issue of about a million Syrian refugees in Lebanon, it would also lead to the 2014 Lebanese presidential election. Due to lack of political agreement, the presidential election was postponed numerous times. Therefore, the presidency had been vacant since May 25, 2014 and it was up to the government to be vested with all executive power (The absence of presidential power had already occurred twice in the history of Lebanon in 1988 and 2007.).

== Composition ==
Lebanese government of April 2013
Portfolio (Ministry)	Minister	Political affiliation	Religious Sect
Independents (8/24)
President Michel Sleiman's Share (3/24)
Deputy Prime Minister and Defence	Samir Mouqbel	Independent	Greek Orthodox
Displaced	Alice Shabtini	Independent	Maronite
Youth and Sports	Abdel Mouttaleb Hennaoui	Independent	Shia
Prime Minister Tammam Salam's Share (3/24)
Prime Minister	Tammam Salam	Future Movement	Sunni
Environment	Mohamed Machnouk	Independent	Sunni
Social Affairs	Rashid Derbass	Independent	Sunni
National Struggle Front (2/24)
Public Health	Wael Abou Faour	Progressive Socialist Party	Druze
Agriculture	Akram Chehayeb	Progressive Socialist Party	Druze
March 8 Alliance (8/24)
Change and Reform bloc (4/24)
Foreign and Expatriates	Gebran Bassil	Free Patriotic Movement	Maronite
Education and Higher Learning	Elias Bou Saab	Free Patriotic Movement	Greek Orthodox
Culture	Raymond Araiji	Marada Movement	Maronite
Energy and Water	Arthur Nazarian	Tashnag	Armenian
Amal Movement (2/24)
Finance	Ali Hassan Khalil	Amal Movement	Shia
Public Works and Transportation	Ghazi Zaiter	Amal Movement	Shia
Loyalty to the Resistance bloc (2/24)
Industry	Hussein Hajj Hassan	Hezbollah	Shia
Minister of State for Parliamentary Affairs	Muhammad Fneish	Hezbollah	Shia
March 14 Alliance (8/24)
Future Movement (3/24)
Interior and Municipalities	Nouhad Machnouk	Future Movement	Sunni
Minister of State for Administrative Development	Nabil de Freige	Future Movement	Roman Catholic
Minister of Justice	Ashraf Rifi	Independent	Sunni
Kataeb Party (3/24)
Labour	Sejaan Kazzi	Kataeb Party	Maronite
Economy and Trade	Alain Hakim	Kataeb Party	Greek Catholic
Information	Ramzi Jreij	Independent	Greek Orthodox
Others (2/24)
Tourism	Michel Pharaon	Independent	Greek Catholic
Telecommunications	Boutros Harb	Independent	Maronite

== Resignation ==
On 18 December 2016, the Ministry of Information announced the dissolution of the Cabinet, and the formation of a new Cabinet under Saad Hariri.

Preceded by Lebanese government of June 2011	List of Lebanese governments	Succeeded by Lebanese government of December 2016
