= Second cabinet of Najib Mikati =

Second Cabinet of Najib Mikati
- Cabinet of Lebanon

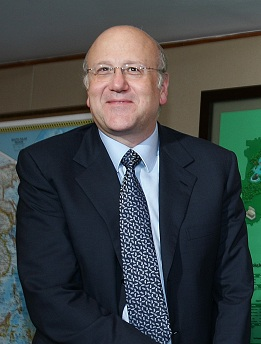
- Najib Mikati
- Date formed: 13 June 2011
- Date dissolved: 15 February 2014

People and organisations
- President: Michel Suleiman
- Head of government: Najib Mikati
- Deputy head of government: Samir Mouqbel
- No. of ministers: 30
- Total no. of members: 30

History
- Predecessor: First Cabinet of Saad Hariri
- Successor: Cabinet of Tammam Salam

The formation of a new government led by Najib Mikati follows five months of negotiations after the fall of the Saad Hariri government. Mikati formed a controversial 30-minister cabinet. Following ruptures and tensions and two previous threats to resign, Mikati finally resigned on 23 March 2013. Tammam Salam was tasked to form a new government on 6 April 2013.

== Background ==
The Hariri government fell after the withdrawal on March 8 of members from his cabinet following refusals to end cooperation with the Special Tribunal for Lebanon. President Michel Suleiman then tasked Mikati to form a new government amid concerns of instability.

Mikati was nominated for office by Hezbollah, Michel Aoun and Walid Jumblatt in January 2011. The cabinet formation process took nearly five months.

== Method ==
Eleven ministers were selected by Michel Aoun's Change and Reform bloc, giving him alone veto power, along with one merge minister backed by both Aoun's political party and Michel Suleiman's presidential power. This lineup brought Aoun back to government leadership for the first time since 1990. Six ministers were from Najib Mikati's prime ministerial team. Six ministers came from the other parties in the March 8 Alliance, which included only two ministers each from Hezbollah and the Amal Movement, whose leader, Nabih Berri, sacrificed a Shiite allocation in order to give a portfolio for Faisal Karami, Omar Karami's son. This resulted in a 7/6/5 inequality between the Sunni, Maronite, and Shiite shares in the Government for the first time since the Taif Agreement. Some believe that this inequality favoring the Sunnis showed no intention from Hezbollah and their allies to rule the government. Finally, Walid Jumblatt's share consisted of three ministers, which is no different from the former government. Regarding the allocation of seats according to leaders' preferences, only Aoun and Mikati benefited from the formation of the new government, due to the increase in slots that they were given.

== Composition ==
Lebanese government of June 2011
Portfolio (Ministry) (Note: "Archived copy". Archived from the original on 6 October 2013.)	Minister	Political affiliation	Religious Sect
Presidential Share (3/30)
Interior and Municipalities	Marwan Charbel	Independent	Maronite
Deputy Prime Minister	Samir Mouqbel	Independent	Greek Orthodox
Environment	Nazim Khoury	Independent	Maronite
Prime Minister Share (6/30)
Prime Minister	Najib Mikati	Glory Movement	Sunni
Finance	Mohammad Safadi	Independent	Sunni
Minister of State	Ahmad Karami	Glory Movement	Sunni
Information	Walid Daouk	Independent	Sunni
Education	Hassan Diab	Independent	Sunni
Economy and Trade	Nicolas Nahas	Glory Movement	Greek Orthodox
Change and Reform bloc (11/30)
Labour	Charbel Nahas	Free Patriotic Movement	Greek Catholic
Telecommunications	Nicolas Sehnaoui	Free Patriotic Movement	Greek Catholic
Culture	Gaby Layyoun	Free Patriotic Movement	Greek Orthodox
Justice	Shakib Qortbawi	Free Patriotic Movement	Maronite
Energy and Water	Gebran Bassil	Free Patriotic Movement	Maronite
Tourism	Fadi Abboud	Free Patriotic Movement	Maronite
Defense	Fayez Ghosn	Marada Movement	Greek Orthodox
Minister of State	Salim Bey Karam	Marada Movement	Maronite
Industry	Vrej Sabounjian	Tashnag	Armenian Orthodox
Minister of State	Panos Manjian	Tashnag	Armenian Orthodox
Minister of State	Marwan Kheireddin	Lebanese Democratic Party	Druze
Loyalty to the Resistance bloc (2/30)
Agriculture	Hussein Hajj Hassan	Hezbollah	Shiite
Minister of State	Mohammad Fneish	Hezbollah	Shiite
Democratic Gathering bloc (3/30)
The displaced	Alaaeddine Terro	Progressive Socialist Party	Sunni
Public Works and Transport	Ghazi Aridi	Progressive Socialist Party	Druze
Social Affairs	Wael Abou Faour	Progressive Socialist Party	Druze
Others (5/30)
Health	Ali Hassan Khalil	Amal Movement	Shiite
Foreign Affairs	Adnan Mansour	Amal Movement	Shiite
Sports and Youth	Faisal Karami	Arab Liberation Party	Sunni
Minister of State	Nicholas Fattoush	Independent	Greek Catholic
Minister of State	Ali Qanso	Syrian Social Nationalist Party	Shiite

Prince Talal Arslan said he would resign after being denied the Defense Ministry portfolio. He said that "I cannot participate in a Cabinet in which [Mikati] says that the Druze do not have a right to be assigned a key ministerial portfolio...[Mikati] is conspiring against coexistence in the country." He further accused Mikati of trying to ignite a conflict within March 8 by lying to the public and attempting to embarrass Hezbollah by stalling the formation of a new government. Security officials said that his supporters in his stronghold of Khalde blocked the highway leading to the village and fired gunshot rounds in the air to protest the Mikati cabinet.

However, the appointment of Faisal Karami was greeted with celebratory gunfire in his hometown of Tripoli.

Mikati's government won a parliamentary vote of confidence on 7 July. The government secured the vote of confidence with 68 out of a 128 votes, after the March 14 alliance members walked out. Mikati then said that "The government confirms it will continue the path of the tribunal...and continue to cooperate in this regard as per the UN Security Council Resolution which set up the tribunal to see justice served."

On 24 February 2012, labor minister Charbel Nahas was succeeded by Salim Jreissati as nominated by Michel Aoun.

== Reactions ==
Domestic

Amid criticism Mikati said "I will not surrender to the logic of victor and vanquished." He also said "the motto of this government is 'all for the country, all for work.'" He further thanked Nabih Berri after the latter had been summoned by Suleiman and Mikati to discuss the conclusion of the cabinet after Berri expressed reservations about such appointments as the sixth Sunni seat, the third Druze seat and the sixth Maronite seat.: "...because if it weren't for his national sacrifices, the government would not have seen the light [of day]."

Cabinet Secretary General Suheil Bouji said "This government will be a government for all Lebanon and will work for all the Lebanese people without discrimination." An anonymous source within Hezbollah said that though Hassan Nasrallah made attempts to form a new government he did not know the composition of the new government before its announcement. He added that though Nasrallah respect UN Security Council resolution 1701 the "Army-People-Resistance formula will be maintained" and that "Nasrallah does not think it is unlikely that Israel will attempt to blow up the domestic situation, but he is convinced that no domestic party will escalate the security situation." Berri spoke of the controversy in the West over the new government: "[The] Americans, as well as many of their European allies, believed that we will not succeed in forming a government, as was the case with a number of their allies, the Europeans...But the formation of the government came as a surprise and a shock to many in more than one place, both internally and externally. Frankly, the Americans want to get their own man to head the [Lebanese] government...they repeatedly give us lessons in democracy. [March 14] has not yet believed, and does not want to believe, that it is no longer in power."

Hariri ordered his Future Movement, while at the same time the 14 March alliance's secretariat general, had set a "management cell" to deal with day-to-day activities in opposition.

Opposition MP Nadim Gemayel said of the government that it was "Hezbollah's and Syria's cabinet." Kataeb bloc MP Elie Marouni also said the new government was a "government of Hezbollah" and added that it was a "coup d'etats" by Hezbollah. 14 March leader Samir Geagea signaled an intention to bring down the March 8 government as they claimed was dominated by Syria and Hezbollah: "The opposition's road map with the new government has been clear since the first moment [of its formation], especially since its nature and identity are clear. It [the government] will work to isolate [Lebanon] at the Arab and international levels, thus posing a danger to Lebanon. This position stems from the government's composition. It is a government of Syria and Hezbollah. It is Syria's government because it was formed to serve as a defense line for the Syrian government [to help it] face its circumstances [anti-government uprising]. It is Hezbollah's government because it was formed to face the indictment and the [Special Tribunal for Lebanon]." He also criticised Hezbollah's opposition to the STL saying that they were a part of the previous government that approved the country's cooperation with the tribunal. "The STL is not some kind of 'barber shop' that anyone can enter and leave whenever he wishes to. [Playing] with the STL will lead to strife and will place Lebanon in conflict with the Arab and international community. 14 March's opposition to this cabinet will be constructive and democratic."

In contrast to 14 March leaders such as Geagea and Amin Gemayel, who criticised the government as dominated by Syria and Hezbollah, Maronite patriarch Beshara Rai expressed support for the new government and said it should be given a chance to prove itself.

A war of words ensued between Michel Aoun and the Future Movement with Aoun's statement that Hariri had been given a "one-way ticket out of Lebanon and the government [and Hariri's] era of paralysing state institutions in a bid to control the country [was over]." Following criticism from the Future Movement for the remarks he responded in saying that "the word one-way ticket does not mean [that I am threatening Hariri's life], I was given one of these [tickets] in 1990 and I rebelled and returned [to Lebanon]. [Former] Prime Minister Saad Hariri can rebel and return [too]." Future Movement MP Khaled Zahraman said that there was a strain on the level of political discourse due to his claims that Aoun's rhetoric was increasingly more fiery and that the country could be headed towards a crisis. He called for all political parties to abide by certain norms and resort instead to dialogue. He said that Aoun was suffering from what he terms an "illusionary victory" with the entrance of FPM ministers into the cabinet. He also added that the FM could not be accused of corruption and that the party was willing to open all files without any exception. Furthermore, he said that Hariri could not return from France as he claimed that threats against Hariri were serious.

Following Mikati's first visit to southern Lebanon as prime minister, where he met army officers and made assurances of Lebanon's intentions to carry out UNSC Resolution 1701, the March 14 Lebanon First bloc MP Okab Sakr said that "[Mikati] wanted to assure Israel that Hezbollah's cabinet will preserve stability and does not want to change the rules of the game, and Hezbollah wanted to deliver a message through Mikati that the party will not target [Israel]." Sakr also added that Hariri absence from Lebanon is preventing political strife.

Supranational bodies

- United Nations - Special Coordinator for Lebanon Michael Williams congratulated Mikati for his new government. "During my discussion with Prime Minister Mikati, I expressed hope that the new government would implement U.N. Security Council Resolution 1701 and Lebanon's international commitments." UNIFIL spokesman Neeraj Singh said "In 2000, when Israel withdrew from south Lebanon, both the parties agreed to respect the Blue Line. UNIFIL's mandate doesn't touch upon a long-term solution [between Lebanon and Israel]. That's something that has to be addressed through political means."

States

- France - France urged Lebanon to "adhere to its international obligations, including cooperation with the U.N.-backed [STL]."
- Iran - Iran has endorsed the new government.
- Israel - Though Israel issued a warning to the new Cabinet to respect what it called "its international legal and border agreements," the Foreign Ministry issued a statement that read "Israel hopes that the new Lebanese government will contribute to reinforcing regional stability and respect for the law along its border. Israel expects the Lebanese government to apply U.N. Security Council resolutions, in particular Resolution 1701, and it calls for the resolution of all outstanding issues through negotiations and with mutual respect." Its spokesman Yigal Palmor later said the statement was not a call for immediate negotiations. "The way to solve everything, one day, is through negotiations. We call on the Lebanese government to adopt the negotiating approach. If they agree to negotiate, then yes, of course we would. If the other side agrees to recognise Israel and to negotiate with Israel and to solve problems through negotiations, then yes, we will negotiate with them."
- Spain - Spain offered its congratulations on the formation of a new government.
- Syria - President Bashar al-Assad was the first to congratulate his Lebanese counterpart on the formation of a new government.
- United States of America - State Department spokesman Mark Toner said that "What's important, in our mind, is that the new Lebanese government abide by the Lebanese Constitution, that it renounce violence, including efforts to extract retribution against former government officials, and lives up to all of its international obligations." An anonymous official told Al-Hayat that the new cabinet was "disappointing" and that the US "does not have any reason to trust that the [March 8-backed cabinet] will be committed to Lebanon's international responsibilities. We are waiting for the Ministerial Statement [to be drafted] and for actions [to be taken]. The key issue "is that Lebanon's new cabinet respect its commitments to international agreements, specifically to UN Security Council Resolution 1701 and the UN-backed Special Tribunal for Lebanon (STL) probing former PM Rafik Hariri's 2005 assassination. [The Lebanese government is] backing the Syrian government at a time when Syria is oppressing its people and isolating itself internationally. The only state in the world that is moving toward [Syria] is Lebanon." An unnamed congressman threatened to withdraw financial assistance to Lebanon. Other officials also warned of the loss of US$100 million if they deem Lebanon to have moved "too far into the orbit of Syria and its primary strategic partner, Iran."

Media

The Canadian-based The Globe and Mail read the government as a "militant Hezbollah ris[ing] to power" amid its claims that the government is "dominated by Hezbollah ."

== Cabinet issues ==
As the new cabinet would meet for the first time, chaired by Suleiman, 15 June, the important issues on hand were the formation of a committee to draft a policy statement outlining the government's position on such issues as Hezbollah's arsenal and the STL. The cabinet was also said to discuss the relations with Syria, international obligations vis-a-vis the STL and such U.N. resolutions as 1701. The STL, however, was read as the first test of the new government.

Following the third cabinet meeting to formulate a policy statement for the government, conflict emerged over the STL. The 12-member committee to draft the statement were in disagreement over an article in relation to the STL with some of the members saying there was no mention of the STL and others saying it was included in the draft but not discussed. Information Minister Walid Daouk said the issue had not been discusses. On 27 June, efforts to form a policy statement were intensified to resolve disputes over the STL, amid reports that the STL was planning issuing indictments for five Hezbollah members. However, a fifth cabinet meeting was still unable to formulate a policy statement before the constitutionally-imposed deadline of one-month. The issue of the STL was the last remaining stumbling block. The Daily Star said that some of the ministers involved said that the STL was facing the same sort of crisis as the government formation talks because of the "inflexibility shown by the team that refuses to include any STL formula in the policy statement," but were instead trying to "buy time."

BBC reported that the cabinet indicated it would not allow the four Hezbollah indictees, including Mustafa Badreddine, to be arrested, though the STL said it released their names to facilitate their arrest. It was rumoured that in November, Mikati had ties approval of funding for the STL (which Hezbollah refused to support) which him staying in office or resigning.

=== Other events ===
Another Future Movement MP Atef Majdalani suggested that "[Former] Prime Minister Saad Hariri's return to Beirut is normal after [a few] months absence. It will give more momentum to the opposition, the Future Movement and the March 14 coalition. We are against this government and the way it was formed. This is a coup government, a Hezbollah government. Our declared goal is to bring down this government." Hezbollah then came in for criticism by Hariri for what he claimed was the sponsorship of "hatred media campaigns"; his Future Movement also issued a statement criticising what it called "a provocative media campaign" against Hariri and also warning that such tactics would deepen political tensions. It also added that though Hezbollah's weapons liberated Lebanon following the departure of Israeli troops in 2000 it had "lost their legitimacy after they had been used against fellow Lebanese and after the party protected four of its members" who were indicted by the STL. The Daily Star read these moves as endangering President Michel Suleiman's call for national dialogue.

=== Reactions ===
In July 2011, opposition Future Movement MP Ahmad Fatfat said that the last remaining issue of contention was Hezbollah's arms which Fatfat said its MP Mohammad Raad would not discuss in a national dialogue committee. "The only disputed issue is the possession of arms and [Hezbollah] MP Mohammad Raad has refused to discuss this issue with the national dialogue committee." The Daily Star said that Fatfat's criticism cast doubt on the probability of a resumption of dialogue to discuss dividing issues between the March 8 alliance and the March 14 alliance. Future Movement MP Nuhad Mashnouq also added that leaders of the parties in the March 14 alliance would consult on "a working paper" in order to coordinate working with the Mikati government. "This working paper seeks to eliminate the causes that led to the formation of this government: The domination of arms in political life and in the constitution." Another March 14 MP Boutros Harb said that he does support Suleiman's call to hold a national dialogue but on the condition that it addresses the issue of non-state arms, in reference to Hezbollah's arsenal. He also added that the STL indictment issue could be resolved to avoid a "tense atmosphere" if the indictees were handed into the respective authorities. He further noted that in his opinion March 8 would pressure the government into transferring the file on unreliable witnesses of the STL to the Justice Council, in what he termed would be "illegal." Finally he added that according to him the new government would implement Hezbollah's orders because it cannot reject what is "impose[d]" on it.

In August, a Future Movement statement responding to Hassan Nasrallah's threat to attack Israeli oil installations if Lebanon's potential facilities are attacked read:

[The Mikati government has] shown that the decision is in the hands of Hezbollah and no one else. The party is the mentor of the government, deciding on its behalf and acting in its name. [Nasrallah's] threats concerning oil and gas reserves in Lebanese waters are a confiscation of the role of the Lebanese state and its institutions. The state and its institutions should be exclusively in charge of preserving Lebanon's sovereignty. This responsibility is neither that of a party nor of an individual but rather the responsibility of all Lebanese."

Fatfat later claimed that neither Aoun nor Mikati make any decisions as, according to him, Hezbollah holds full power over the government. He said in reference to Aoun's threat to withdraw from the cabinet if it does not pursue development projects that "such decisions are in the hands of [Hezbollah Secretary General] Sayyed Hassan Nasrallah and Syrian President [Bashar Assad]. [Threats to resign are a form of internal pressure [in order to improve] circumstances. Hezbollah may feel at a certain [point] that it needs to obstruct the cabinet to avoid making big decisions linked to the Special Tribunal for Lebanon (STL) and to dealing with the Syrian situation in the UN Security Council. The cabinet will then be obstructed and transformed into a caretaker one."

== 2012 national fissures ==
As a result of the Syrian civil war and the sectarian nature of the conflict, including the kidnappings of Shia Lebanese by the Free Syrian Army, conflict spilled over into Lebanon, which also had sectarian strife in the past. After Hassan al Meqdad of the Meqdad clan was kidnapped in the summer of 2012, his family carried out retributive kidnappings of Syrians affiliated with the FSA and a Turk. A family member of Meqdad, Maher al Meqdad, told Al Jazeera:

We don't consider ourselves above the law, but when there is no state, like now, then we need to act to protect ourselves. We waited for the government to do something and they didn't. Therefore, we were forced to do something to bring back our son. The Free Syrian Army kidnapped 11 Shia Lebanese four months ago, and until now, the government has done nothing to bring them back. We don't want this for our family, so we believe [the kidnappings] are the only way to bring back our son. Let me be clear; they kill Hassan, and we will kill the Turk, inshallah. People have been saying that the chaos over the last couple of days is because of the 'Meqdadi' way, but these comments don't bother me. We are not responsible for the actions of others, and we have control over our own people.

Other such kidnappings also took place, while Syrians in Lebanon continued to face threats. March 14 supporters then took out protests calling for the government to resign as it could not control the events. Boutros Harb also said: "This government is absent, as everyone has the freedom to act as he chooses and behave without order. This is putting the country in jeopardy. Those responsible are no longer at the level where they can control the situation, and these actions are the result of the Syrian government trying to destabilise Lebanon. We need to stop the outlaws...we have never reached this level of behaviour before."

== Mikati's resignation ==
On 22 March 2013, Prime Minister Najib Mikati announced his surprise resignation. Mufti of Lebanon Mohammed Rashid Qabbani said that he had prepared his resignation before a usual cabinet meeting citing a negative climate. It followed his attempt to form a committee to oversee the 2013 Lebanese general election in opposition to FPM, Hezbollah and Amal ministers, as well as an attempt to extend the term of Major General Ashraf Rifi, the head of the Internal Security Forces (ISF), who was scheduled to retire in April due to mandatory age limit. Mikati still attended the meeting but it was to no avail and he consequently resigned. His attempt to extend Rifi's tenure was read by Al Monitor as a trump card over the Sunni-stronghold of Tripoli. This was the third time he threatened to resign. The Lebanese president accepted his resignation on 23 March 2013.

== New government ==
Following talks in Saudi Arabia and with the support of the Progressive Socialist Party and the March 14 Alliance, Tammam Salam was announced as the consensus candidate for prime minister on 4 April 2013. The next day the Amal Movement also supported his candidacy as well as Najib Mikati. On 6 April 2013, Salam was tasked to form a new government which could be established in February 2014.

Preceded by Lebanese government of November 2009	List of Lebanese governments	Succeeded by Lebanese government of April 2013
