= Nicolas Nahas =

Lebanese politician (born 1946)

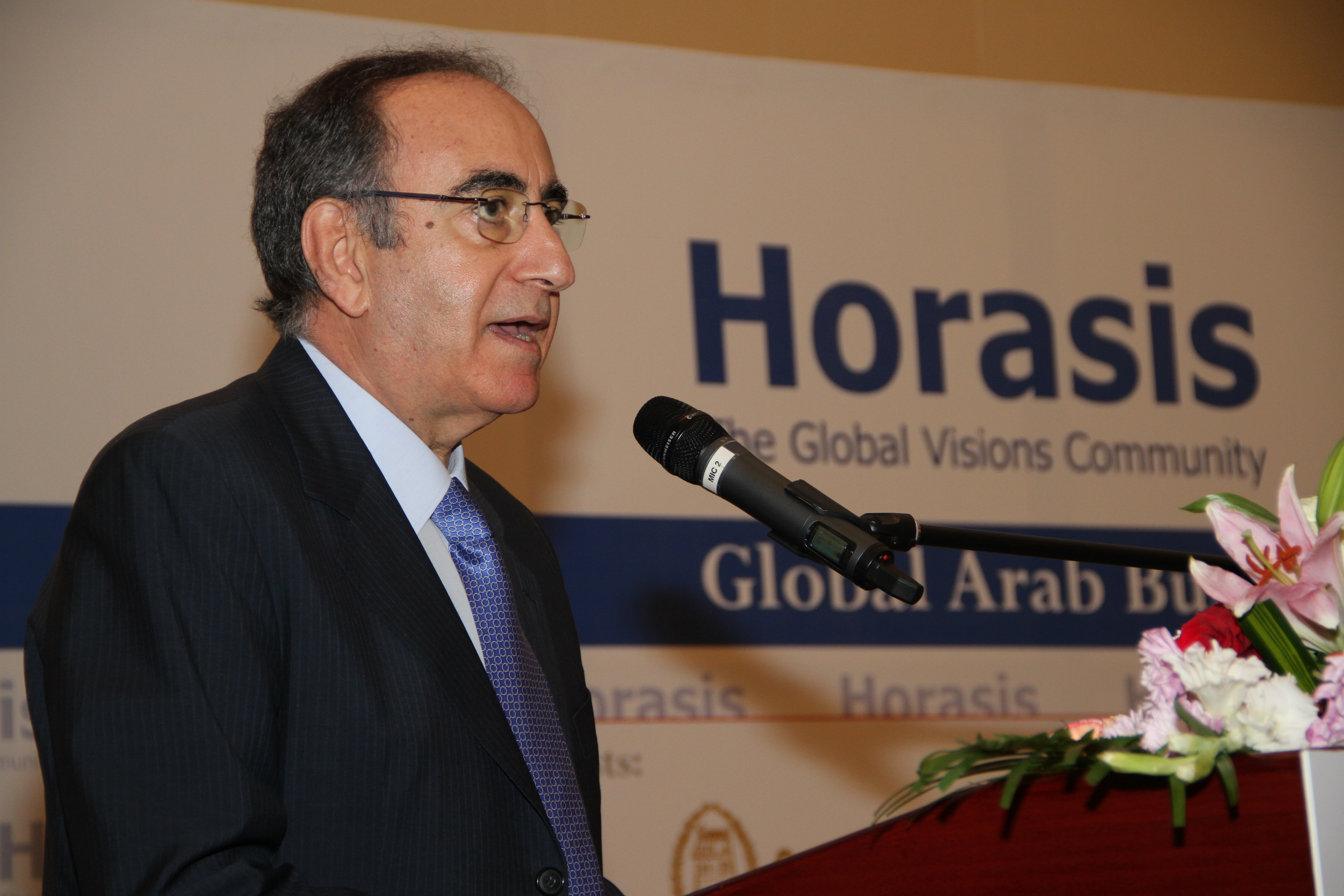

Minister of Economy and Trade
- In office 13 June 2011 – 15 February 2014
- Prime Minister: Najib Mikati
- Preceded by: Mohammad Safadi

Personal details
- Born: 28 November 1946 (age 79) Al Tall, Tripoli, Lebanon
- Party: Glory Movement
- Spouse: Antoinette Haidar
- Children: Three
- Education: Saint Joseph University; Harvard Business School

Nicolas Nahas (born 28 November 1946) is a Lebanese businessman and politician. He was the minister of economy and trade between 2011 and 2014.

== Early life and education ==
Nahas was born in Tripoli on 28 November 1946. He received a bachelor of science degree in civil engineering from Saint Joseph University in 1972 Then he attended the postgraduate ISMP program at Harvard Business School in 1992. and received a degree in business administration there.

== Career ==
Nahas began his career as a businessman in varied fields. In 2005, he was appointed by Prime Minister Najib Mikati as the chief economical counsellor. Nahas was appointed minister of economy and trade on 13 June 2011 to the cabinet led by Najib Mikati. He was one of the government ministers appointed by the prime minister in the cabinet.

== Personal life ==
Nahas is married to Antoinette Haidar and has three children.

Political offices
Preceded by Mohammad Safadi	Minister of Economy and Trade; 2011-2014	Succeeded by Alain Hakim
