= First cabinet of Saad Hariri =

Lebanese government 2009–2011

First Cabinet of Saad Hariri
- Cabinet of Lebanon

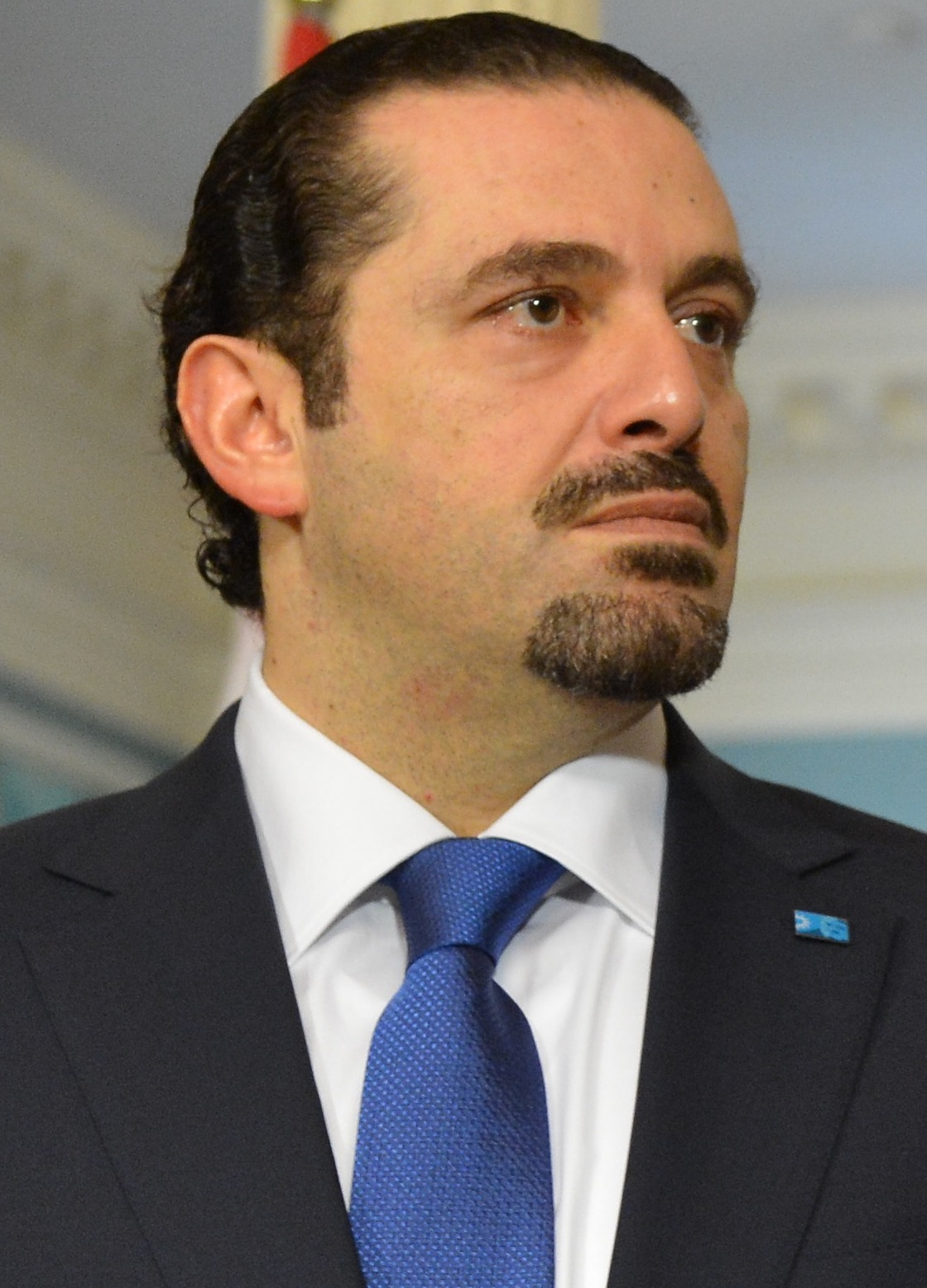
- Date formed: 9 November 2009
- Date dissolved: 13 June 2011

People and organisations
- President: Michel Sleiman
- Head of government: Saad Hariri
- Deputy head of government: Elias Murr
- No. of ministers: 30
- Total no. of members: 30

History
- Predecessor: Second Cabinet of Fouad Siniora
- Successor: Second Cabinet of Najib Mikati

On 9 November 2009, after five months of negotiations following the 2009 parliamentary elections, Lebanese prime minister Saad Hariri formed a national unity government.

== Method ==
Fifteen ministers were selected by Hariri's March 14 Alliance, ten from the opposition March 8 Alliance, and five allotted to President Michel Suleiman. This formula denied March 14 a majority of cabinet posts, while also preventing the opposition from wielding veto power, which requires 11 posts. Thus, at least in theory, the ministers selected by President Suleiman—considered impartial—hold a swing vote on decision making.

== Composition ==
Lebanese government of November 2009
Portfolio	Minister	Political affiliation	Religious Sect
President Michel Sleiman's Share (5/30)
Deputy Prime Minister and Defence	Elias Murr	Independent	Greek Orthodox
Minister of Interior	Ziad Baroud	Independent	Maronite
State Minister	Mona Ofeich	Independent	Greek Orthodox
State Minister	Adnan Hussein	Independent	Shia
State Minister	Adnan Kassar	Independent	Sunni
March 14 Alliance (15/30)
Prime Minister	Saad Hariri	Future Movement	Sunni
Finance Minister	Raya Al-Hassan	Future Movement	Sunni
Education Minister	Hassan Mneimneh	Future Movement	Sunni
Environment Minister	Mohammad Rahhal	Future Movement	Sunni
Minister of Information	Tarek Mitri	Future Movement	Greek Orthodox
Minister of State	Michel Pharaon	Future Movement	Greek Catholic
Minister of State	Jean Ogassapian	Future Movement	Armenian Catholic
Minister of Public Works	Ghazi Aridi	Progressive Socialist Party	Druze
Minister of Displaced	Akram Chehayeb	Progressive Socialist Party	Druze
State Minister	Wael Abou Faour	Progressive Socialist Party	Druze
Minister of Justice	Ibrahim Najjar	Lebanese Forces	Greek Orthodox
Minister of Culture	Salim Warde	Lebanese Forces	Greek Catholic
Minister of Social Affairs	Salim Sayegh	Kataeb Party	Maronite
Minister of Economy and Trade	Mohammad Safadi	Tripoli Bloc	Sunni
Minister of Labor	Boutros Harb	Independent	Maronite
March 8 Alliance (10/30)
Minister of Energy and Water	Gebran Bassil	Free Patriotic Movement	Maronite
Minister of Tourism	Fadi Abboud	Free Patriotic Movement	Maronite
Minister of Telecommunications	Charbel Nahas	Free Patriotic Movement	Greek Catholic
Minister of Foreign Affairs	Ali Shami	Amal Movement	Shia
Minister of Public Health	Mohammad Jawad Khalifeh	Amal Movement	Shia
Minister of Youth and Sports	Ali Abdullah	Amal Movement	Shia
Minister of Agriculture	Hussein Hajj Hassan	Hezbollah	Shia
State Minister for Administrative Development	Muhammad Fneish	Hezbollah	Shia
Minister of Industry	Abraham Dedeyan	Tashnag	Armenian Orthodox
State Minister	Youssef Saadeh	Marada Movement	Maronite

Preceded by Lebanese government of July 2008	List of Lebanese governments	Succeeded by Lebanese government of June 2011

== Vote of confidence ==
The cabinet and government program were voted for confidence on 10 December 2009. Confidence votes by 122 out of 128 MPs were given in favor of Hariri's cabinet and its program.

== PSP withdrawal ==
On 2 August 2009, Walid Jumblatt withdrew his PSP from the governing March 14 alliance. The Future Movement said that though everyone had the right to adopt their independent agendas the March 14 coalition never rejected other parties. Mountain Unity bloc MP Fadi al-Aawar told the told FPM's Orange TV that Jumblat's withdrawal would not automatically mean his admission to the March 8 alliance. He also suggested that the alliance with March 14 was "out of necessity" and then had to end to pave the way for a new period. Jumblatt also told US charge d’affaires Michele Sison that both the Special Tribunal for Lebanon (STL) was not strong enough to intimidate Syria and that "during that stage [of support for March 14], I was in a [state of] alienation which led me to use rhetoric that does not match [my] national heritage. I have now [restored] my real, natural and historical position." It was suggested that, as a result of statement during the weeks and months prior to his withdrawal, he had made the decision to withdraw based on growing dissent.

== 2011 fall of government ==
On 12 January 2011, the government collapsed after energy minister Gebran Bassil announced that all ten opposition ministers had resigned following months of warnings by Hezbollah that it would not remain inactive should there be indictments against the group. The New York Times suggested the resignations came after the collapse of talks between Syria and Saudi Arabia to ease tensions in Lebanon. It also suggested that the opposition wanted 11 resignations before Hariri's meeting with US President Barack Obama so as to embarrass Hariri for not having a government. However, Suleiman-appointee, Minister of State Adnan Sayyed Hussein, resigned later. The resignations stemmed from PM Hariri's refusal to call an emergency cabinet session over discussion for withdrawing cooperation with the Special Tribunal for Lebanon, which was expected to indict Hezbollah members in the assassination of former Prime Minister Rafic Hariri. Following the fall of the government reports of an "imminent release" of the indictments circulated, though constitutionally there would be no government to receive the indictment as this was first time in Lebanese history a government had fallen after the resignations of a third of the government. Preliminary indictments were issued 17 January as expected,) though they were pending STL approval.

The government lasted barely 14-months and was considered dysfunctional; its collapse precipitated a climate of political deadlock and tension similar to that which existed between 2006 and 2008.

President Michel Suleiman is constitutionally responsible for the formation of a new government, though the prospects for reconciliation between the two polarised parliamentary blocs remains dim in the near-term. He accepted the resignations saying: "In line with clause one of article 69 in the Lebanese constitution on the circumstances under which the government is considered to have resigned...as the government has lost more than one third of its members...the cabinet [is requested to] act as a caretaker government until the formation of a new government." Suleiman asked Hariri to maintain a caretaker role while charging him with forming a new government following an emergency return from a summit in the United States and a stopover in France and Turkey. He said that "There is no alternative for all of us but dialogue, and no side in Lebanon will be able to eliminate the other," further adding that he would work with his allies to form a government in line with "national unity" objectives.

=== Reactions ===
==== Domestic politics ====
Hariri vowed to find a way out of the crisis saying his allies and he would take part in "consultations" to a name a new leader.

Nabih Berri, the Lebanese parliamentary speaker and a member of the March 8 alliance, said Suleiman would formally launch talks to create a new government on 16 January. However, March 8 said it would no longer be involved in an Hariri government. Mohammad Raad, an Hezbollah MP, said his party would nominate a candidate for prime minister who has "a history of resistance." Though, March 14 said it would not accept anyone other than Hariri. One of his bloc's MP's, Boutros Harb, said "I do not see a government in the country without Saad Hariri." and despite March 14 saying it was willing to compropose that "there’s no way to compromise on the issue of the court and justice." March 8's Health Minister Mohamad Jawad Khalifeh said: "We don’t want any escalation. We are committed to the Constitution. We don’t know what commitment the others are talking about."

Walid Jumblatt, the former March 14 member and head of the PSP, traveled to Syria to discuss the crisis with al-Assad amid possibilities that he could be a kingmaker in forming a new government. His Democratic Gathering bloc was scheduled to meet on 16 January to discuss its stance over the parliamentary consultations.

During Hezbollah Secretary-General Hassan Nasrallah's first speech after the fall of the government, broadcast on Al Manar, he said that "the opposition unanimously will not name Hariri tomorrow [and that the move to bring down the government was] constitutional, legal and democratic. Despite the fact we reject the indictment simply for being politicised, Lebanon is our homeland and we are keen on its safety and stability."

Supranational

The Secretary-General of the Arab League, Amr Moussa, said that only a unity government can prevent another civil war. He said doors of dialogue must be left open to form a "national accord" that would be in Lebanon's "supreme interest".

Eric Mottu of the International Monetary Fund said instability could be detrimental to the economy of Lebanon and that the withdrawals from the government "will further erode confidence and may heighten the risk of a further slowdown. "For growth, investment, consumption and tourism it could be a risk."

International

- Iran - Iran blamed the United States and Israel for "sabotage and obstruction" that led to the fall of the government.
- Israel - Israel reacted with alarm at the fall of the government. Analysts suggested that if Hezbollah took control of Lebanon, an Israeli-Lebanese war would follow (see Israeli–Lebanese conflict). Israeli Deputy Prime Minister Silvan Shalom described the new Lebanese government as an "Iranian government on Israel's northern border."
- Saudi Arabia - Prince Saud al-Faisal, the Saudi foreign minister, said: "The resignations will be dangerous, as they will cause clashes once again. Thus, we hope these resignations will not take place. They have the potential to cause everything built so far to collapse." He also warned of possible regional repercussions.
- Turkey - As Hariri returned to Lebanon he met Turkish Prime Minister Recep Tayyip Erdogan, who pledged to play "an active role" in ending the political crisis. "We cannot tolerate Lebanon becoming mired in political instability. All parties to the Lebanon crisis must act responsibly and must above all take into account Lebanon's interest." He also said that Turkey would work with Iran and Syria to resolve problems.
- United Kingdom - Foreign Secretary William Hague said the withdrawals were "extremely serious" and could have "grave implications" across the Middle East. He also said the UK "strongly condemns" alleged attempts to undermine the STL "which must be allowed to do its work without any obstacle. Justice must take its course and there should be an end to impunity for political assassinations in Lebanon."
- United States of America - The President's office said that Hezbollah was "demonstrating their own fear and determination to block the government’s ability to conduct its business and advance the aspirations of all of the Lebanese people." Secretary of State Hillary Clinton said "We view what happened today as a transparent effort by those forces inside Lebanon, as well as interests outside Lebanon, to subvert justice and undermine Lebanon’s stability and progress, We believe that the work of the Special Tribunal must go forward so justice can be served and impunity ended." She was also said to have spoken on the issue of the STL and its repercussions with other regional leaders. The ambassador to Lebanon said that the "United States and the international community have said from the beginning, the Special Tribunal for Lebanon is an irrevocable, international judicial process; its work is not a matter of politics but of law. The resignation of some of Lebanon's ministers will not change this...The United States remains steadfast in its support for Lebanon's state institutions through our robust military, security, and economic development assistance. We expect a new government will emerge through constitutional procedures, and our strong partnership with Lebanon will endure." The US continued to maintain that the STL was "irrevocable."
  - Elliott Abrams, a former Bush administration security adviser, said that "Hezbollah has been holding the entire country hostage while arming itself to the teeth with the help of Syria and Iran. Today’s Hezbollah resignation from the government, where it formally held minority status, is a threat to every Lebanese. If Hariri complies with Hezbollah's demands, he is in my view finished as a national and as a Sunni leader, having compromised his own, his family's, and his country's honour. It appears that Hariri won't do it, which is both a moral and a politically intelligent decision. Instead he and his country are left floating, trying to avoid violence that may only benefit Hezbollah and watching Saudi and Syrian mediation whose outcome for Lebanese sovereignty is likely to be tragic."

Other reactions

The BLOM stock index crashed following the collapse of the government. However, it stabilised the next day as the central bank said there was no rush to the US dollar and that it would intervene to stabilise Lebanon currency and economy should there be a capital flight from the pound. Though fears from a lingering political crisis existed.

=== Analysis ===
Michael Young of the Daily Star said that "[Syrian President Bashir al-] Assad is smarting from the American derailing of Syrian-Saudi talks...Assad does not want to be blamed by Washington and Paris for whatever goes wrong in Lebanon, and he grasps that any confrontation between the Lebanese might only reinforce Hezbollah, and more importantly Iran, at Syria's expense. Neither Hezbollah nor Syria is pleased with what is going on. For the party, all the contentious means of crippling the tribunal have grave shortcomings. A serious political or security escalation would only harden discord at a moment when Hezbollah's primary goal is to show that Lebanon is united in its rejection of the special tribunal. As for Assad, if he pushes too hard, he may lose for good the Lebanese Sunni card, which he has worked for years to regain. Hariri alone can issue Hezbollah with a certificate of innocence, and if the prime minister decides to sit the coming period out of office, it is difficult to see how any opposition-led government would function properly."

Al Quds Al Arabi stated a "stage of escalation has started" in Lebanon.

Al Manar reported that "sectarian rhetoric was re-vivified in Lebanon with some politicians and clerics claiming that nominating anyone else than Saad Hariri as prime minister was tantamount to sedition."

As Safir stated that "Lebanon entered a new phase yesterday, an open-ended one characterized by a profound and long-term political and governmental crisis. This month will be the month of crises and unpleasant surprises."

An Nahar also added that there would be "no easy way out of Lebanon's new political crisis. No one is under the illusion that the open crisis will come to an end anytime soon, particularly as the opposition resigned from government as a pre-emptive strike before the tribunal issues its indictments."

Al Akhbar ran a headline the next day saying the results of the resignation were "The Beginning of the Unknown." The New York Times read this as a feat that "the unknown...could turn bloody, with street clashes in which Hezbollah is likely to prevail." However, it also cited other analysts as dismissing the prospect of violence as both a result of Hezbollah's strength and Turkey's emergence as regionally influential middleman that both sides would avoid alienating. The quoted analysts said it was more likely to simply have a longer period of a political stalemate akin to the 2006–2008 period.

Zvi Bar'el of Haaretz also said that the resignations were "intended to show Syria the limitations of its influence on the group and to tell Damascus that if it wanted to show Washington it can preserve stability in Lebanon, Hezbollah and Iran will have the last word. Nasrallah, who is not pleased with the strengthening ties between Syria and Hariri and fears they will gnaw at his power, now wants to reshuffle the cabinet, have a new prime minister appointed and split up the coalition. This will increase Hezbollah's strength and could thwart Syria's ability to form a political bloc that would counterbalance the group."

The New York Times also reported that while the government was expected to fall after the STL's indictments, it was not expected to fall so soon. It also pointed out the complexities of Lebanese politics as having "foreign powers habitually play in the country’s domestic affairs" with Hezbollah backed by Iran and Syria, while the United States, France and Saudi Arabia back Hariri's Future Movement.

Other analysts warned of the consequences to Lebanon stemming from the STL in some form. Joshua Landis of the Center for Middle East Studies at the University of Oklahoma said that "The new show down caused by the impending indictments of the International Tribunal will return Lebanon to paralysis not war. Hezbollah has made it clear that it does not want war. It will not carry out a 'coup,' as some have claimed. But it will bring government to a stand still. The highest price will be paid by Lebanon's wealthy communities. They have the most to lose by a slow down in investment, the collapse of the stock market, and decline in economic growth. And to think that Lebanon was growing at eight per cent last year. Now we are sure to see more immobility, sectarian strife, and economic stagnation in the Middle East." Graeme Bannerman of the Middle East Institute said that "Probably no one in the world wants the tribunal more than Hariri, but he has a whole series of other considerations. He can't govern without consensus." He also said that the United States' backing of the STL has "an alternative agenda, which is to weaken Hezbollah and therefore Syria and Iran. It doesn't take into consideration how the Lebanese political system works. I think we are an essential part of Hariri's problem. I think we are making his life more difficult rather than easier."

Jamal Wakim, a professor at Lebanese International University, said the crisis was "very serious, [as] for the first time since 2008 we have a big division in the country, we have no talks going on between the March 8 and March 14 groups." He added that the opposition March 8 was not likely to form a government on its own and that "there is more yet to come. Violence might break out whenever we have political instability, and now we have a political confrontation between two opposing groups, and its most likely that it will happen." Edward Bell, an analyst for the Middle East and North Africa at the Economist Intelligence Unit said Lebanon could now go for several months without any government. "The external player with the best chance at defusing the situation is Syria as it maintains contact with all parties, both inside and outside of Lebanon, and can apply pressure on Hezbollah to reach a consensus with other Lebanese parties."

== New government formation ==
President Michel Suleiman then nominated billionaire businessman Najib Mikati to form a new government. His candidature was controversial as it was seen as part of Hezbollah's growing influence in the country.

The process of a new government was read to be more difficult after Saudi Arabia pulled out of talks to assuage concerns following the fall of the government. However, Turkey said it would play active role to ease tensions. Following a commemoration on 13 March 2011 of the March 14's "revolution," in which Hariri called for an end to Hezbollah's arms, Mikati called his statements an incitement.

On 18 March a meeting between Mikati and representatives of March 8 failed to break the deadlock on formation of a new government. A new government was formed on 13 June.

=== Reactions ===
Domestic

In commencing government formation negotiations Mikati said "Let us go to work immediately according to the principles and basis that we have affirmed our commitment to several times, namely...defending Lebanon's sovereignty and its independence and liberating land that remains under the occupation of the Israeli enemy." Nasrallah called on Mikati's opponents to give him a chance and accused them of "seeking power for power's sake rather than that of the Lebanese people."

Even though Mikati is a Sunni, some Sunnis, who supported the March 14 alliance, protested the decision calling for a "day of anger" over claims that Iran and Syria were gaining influence in the country.

Member of the March 14 alliance and Lebanese Forces leader Samir Geagea said that he believed if Hezbollah took power "the situation in Lebanon will soon be like the one in Gaza." He also criticised Jumblatt's support for Hezbollah even before the negotiations for the new government commenced.

Maronite patriarch Nasrallah Sfeir called for the swift formation of a new government.

In March, the Beirut Stock Exchange continued to suffer as a result of the political uncertainty.

International

- Canada issued a statement urging all the various political factions to work together, though it also warned that it would not work with the new government if Hezbollah was a leading a member.

- Qatar, who were previously involved in forming an agreement over the last government, said they hoped consultations would be postponed over the new nominee.

- United States President Barack Obama said he would visit France for talks over the crisis in Lebanon.

  - Asharq Al Awsat said that the United States responded in suggesting it was considering severing economic ties, which sought to implement UN Resolution 1701, if Mikati were to become PM.

Non-state

Ynet suggested that Mikati would not "automatically embrace Hezbollah['s] position."

== See also ==
- Lebanese government of June 2011
