= Ministry of Education and Higher Education (Lebanon) =

Government ministry of Lebanon

Coordinates: 33°52′47″N 35°29′10″E

Lebanese Republic Ministry of Education and Higher Education
- Coat of arms of Lebanon

Agency overview
- Jurisdiction: Government of Lebanon
- Headquarters: Beirut (Lebanon)
- Agency executive: Rima Karami, Minister of Education
- Website: Official website

The Republic of Lebanon Ministry of Education & Higher Education (Arabic: الجمهورية اللبنانية وزارة التربية والتعليم العالي) is a government agency of Lebanon headquartered in Beirut.

== List of Education ministers ==
The following individuals have served as Minister of Education:

Minister	Term of office	
Habib Abou Shahla	25 Sep 1943	09 Jan 1945
Wadih Naiim	09 Jan 1945	22 Aug 1945
Hamid Frangieh	22 Aug 1945	11 Apr 1946
Philippe Takla	11 Apr 1946	14 Dec 1946
Elias Khoury (Note: Served simultaneously as Minister of Public Health.)	14 Dec 1946	07 Jun 1947
Hamid Frangieh	07 Jun 1947	01 Oct 1949
Riad Al Solh	01 Oct 1949	06 Oct 1949
Raeef Abi Al Lamaa	06 Oct 1949	14 Feb 1951
Edward Noun	14 Feb 1951	07 Jun 1951
Emile Lahoud	07 Jun 1951	11 Feb 1952
Antoine Stephan	11 Feb 1952	09 Sep 1952
Basil Trad (Note: Did not submit a ministerial statement to Parliament.)	09 Sep 1952	18 Sep 1952
Nazem Akkari (Note: Served simultaneously as Minister of Telecommunications.)	18 Sep 1952	30 Sep 1952
Salim Haidar	30 Sep 1952	30 Apr 1953
Pierre Edde	30 Apr 1953	16 Aug 1953
Nicholas Salem	16 Aug 1953	16 Sep 1954
Maurice Zouein	16 Sep 1954	09 Jul 1955
Salim Lahoud	09 Jul 1955	19 Sep 1955
Georges Hakim (Note: Served simultaneously as Minister of Economy from 19 March 1956 until 8 June 1956.)	19 Sep 1955	08 Jun 1956
Fouad Ghosn	08 Jun 1956	18 Nov 1956
Charles Malek	18 Nov 1956	18 Aug 1957
Farid Qozma	18 Aug 1957	14 Mar 1958
Clovis El Khazen	14 May 1958	24 Sep 1958
Mohamad Safieddine	24 Sep 1958	14 Oct 1958
Pierre Gemayel	14 Oct 1958	07 Oct 1959
Fouad Boutros	07 Oct 1959	14 May 1960
Gebran Nahas (Note: Served simultaneously as Minister of Justice.)	14 May 1960	01 Aug 1960
Kamal Jumblatt	01 Aug 1960	20 May 1961
Mohamad Safieddine	20 May 1961	31 Oct 1961
Kamel Al Assad	31 Oct 1961	20 Feb 1964
Charles Helou	20 Feb 1964	18 Aug 1964
Gebran Nahas	18 Aug 1964	25 Sep 1964
Edmond Gaspard	25 Sep 1964	18 Nov 1964
Ghaleb Shahine	18 Nov 1964	25 Jul 1965
Sleiman El Zein	25 Jul 1965	09 Apr 1966
Fouad Boutros	09 Apr 1966	06 Dec 1966
Sleiman El Zein	06 Dec 1966	08 Feb 1968
Jean Aziz	08 Feb 1968	12 Oct 1968
Abdallah Yafi	12 Oct 1968	15 Jan 1969
Joseph Bou Khater	15 Jan 1969	13 Oct 1970
Ghassan Tueini	13 Oct 1970	20 Jan 1971
Najib Abou Haidar	20 Jan 1971	27 May 1972
Edward Honein	27 May 1972	09 Aug 1972
Henry Eddeh	09 Aug 1972	02 Oct 1972
Albert Moukhayber	02 Oct 1972	25 Apr 1973
Edmond Rizk	25 Apr 1973	31 Oct 1974
Majed Hamada	31 Oct 1974	23 May 1975
Moses Canaan	23 May 1975	01 Jul 1975
Philip Said	01 Jul 1975	16 Jun 1976
Camille Chamoun	16 Jun 1976	15 Sep 1976
Adel Osseiran	15 Sep 1976	09 Dec 1976
Assad Rizk	09 Dec 1976	16 Jul 1979
Peter War	16 Jul 1979	25 Oct 1980
Rebler Moawad	25 Oct 1980	10 Jul 1982
Issam Khoury	10 Jul 1982	30 Apr 1984
Salim Al Hos	30 Apr 1984	22 Sep 1988
Michel Aoun	22 Sep 1988	25 Nov 1989
Omar Karami	25 Nov 1989	24 Dec 1990
Peter War	24 Dec 1990	16 May 1992
Zaki Mzabudi	16 May 1992	31 Oct 1992
Michael Al-Dahir	31 Oct 1992	25 May 1995
Robert Ghanem	25 May 1995	11 Jul 1996
Jan Obaid	11 Jul 1996	04 Dec 1998
Muhammad Baydoun (Note: Served simultaneously as Minister of Culture.)	04 Dec 1998	26 Oct 2000
Abdul Rahim Murad	26 Oct 2000	17 Apr 2003
Samir Jisr	17 Apr 2003	26 Oct 2004
Ahmad Minkara	26 Oct 2004	19 Apr 2005
Ghassan Salamé	19 Apr 2005	28 Apr 2005
Assad Rizk	28 Apr 2005	19 Jul 2005
Khaled Kabbani	19 Jul 2005	11 Jul 2008
Bahia Hariri	11 Jul 2008	09 Nov 2009
Hassan Mneimneh	09 Nov 2009	13 Jun 2011
Hassan Diab	13 Jun 2011	19 Feb 2014
Elias Bou Saab	19 Feb 2014	18 Feb 2016
Marwan Hamadeh	18 Feb 2016	04 Feb 2019
Akram Chehayeb	04 Feb 2019	21 Jan 2020
Tarek Majzoub (Note: Resigned 10 August 2020, but remained in office as caretaker minister.)	21 Jan 2020	10 Sep 2021
Abbas Halabi (Note: Resigned 30 October 2022, but remained in office as caretaker minister.)	10 Sep 2021	08 Feb 2025
Rima Karami	08 Feb 2025	Incumbent

== See also ==
- Lebanese University
- List of universities in Lebanon
