= Ahmad Karami =

Lebanese politician (1944–2020)

Minister of State
- In office 13 June 2011 – March 2013
- Prime Minister: Najib Mikati

Personal details
- Born: Ahmad Mustafa Karami; 29 August 1944 Tripoli, Lebanon
- Died: 5 July 2020 (aged 75) Beirut, Lebanon
- Spouse: Zeina Al Nabhani
- Children: Three
- Education: Beirut Arab University

Ahmad Karami (Arabic: أحمد كرامي; 29 August 1944 – 5 July 2020) was a Sunni Lebanese politician and minister of state in the cabinet of Najib Mikati.

== Early life and education ==
Karami was from a powerful political family based in Tripoli. His father, Mustafa Karami, founded the National Youth Party in 1933. Former Prime Ministers Rashid Karami and Omar Karami were both cousins of Mustafa Karami.

Ahmad Karami was born in Tripoli on 29 August 1944. He held a bachelor's degree in economics and political science which he received from Beirut Arab University in 1970.

== Career ==
Karami served as the director of the port of Tripoli from 1973 to 1991. Then he became the deputy of Tripoli following the general election in 1996 and the 2009 general elections. He was elected on Saad Hariri's list in the 2009 elections.

Karami supported the premiership of Najib Mikati in 2011 after the cabinet of Saad Hariri collapsed. Karami was appointed minister of state in June 2011 to the cabinet led by Prime Minister Najib Mikati. Mikati appointed him to the cabinet. Karami was one of the non-affiliated members and seven Sunni ministers of the Mikati cabinet. His term ended in March 2013, when Najib Mikati resigned due to dispute with Hezbollah members in the cabinet.

== Personal life and death ==
Karami married Zeina Al Nabhani and had three children. He died on 5 July 2020 at the hospital of American University of Beirut following a sudden illness.
