= Majzoob =

Majzoob is a follower in Sufism.

Majzoob or Majzoub or Majdoub or Mejdub may refer to:

- Abderrahman El Majdoub, is a Moroccan Sufi.
- Mahmoud al-Majzoub, is a Palestinian leader.
- Muhammad El Majzoub, is a Syrian singer.
- Ramzi Majdoub, is a Tunisian handball player.
- Tarek Majzoub, is a Lebanese politician.
