= Adnan Hussein =

Lebanese politician (born 1954)

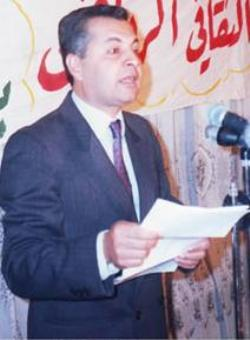

Minister of State
- In office 9 November 2009 – January 2011
- President: Michel Suleiman
- Prime Minister: Saad Hariri

Personal details
- Born: Adnan Sayyed Hussein; 27 February 1954 (age 72) Zkak Al Blat, Lebanon
- Party: Independent
- Education: Lebanese University

Adnan Hussein (born 27 February 1954) is a Lebanese political scientist, academic and politician who served as minister of state for social affairs in the cabinet led by Prime Minister Saad Hariri. He is a close ally of former Lebanese President Michel Suleiman.

== Early life and education ==
Hussein was born in Zkak Al Blat on 27 February 1954. He holds a PhD in political science, which he received from Lebanese University in 1989.

== Career ==
Hussein began his teaching career at Lebanese University in 1990. He also taught at the command college of the Lebanese Armed Forces. He served as minister of state for social affairs from 9 November 2009 to January 2011. He was one of five ministers appointed by President Michel Suleiman. In addition, Hussein was one of the independent and Shia members of the cabinet. His resignation from office led to the toppling of Saad Hariri's cabinet, since ten ministers, who were the members of the 8 March alliance, had resigned before. They resigned due to their objections to the UN investigation into the assassination of Rafik Hariri in 2005.

In October 2011, Hussein was made the president of Lebanese University which caused criticisms due to his limited qualifications for being a university president because he does not know any other language than his native Arabic.
