= Rima Karami =

Lebanese academic

- ريما كرامي
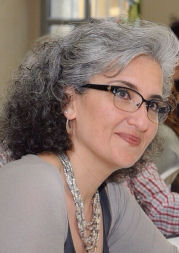
- Karami in 2015

Minister of Education and Higher Education
- Incumbent
- Assumed office 8 February 2025
- President: Joseph Aoun
- Prime Minister: Nawaf Salam
- Preceded by: Abbas Halabi

Personal details
- Born: 6 May 1967 (age 59) Tripoli, Lebanon
- Party: Independent
- Education: American University of Beirut; Portland State University
- Cabinet: Nawaf Salam cabinet

Rima Karami (Arabic: ريما كرامي, born on May 6, 1967) is the Minister of Education and Higher Education in Lebanon since February 8, 2025. She is also the director of the Tamam Project, a regional initiative for sustainable school improvement. Rima is an associate professor and was the chairperson of the Department of Education at the American University of Beirut.

== Early life and education ==
Rima was born on May 6, 1967, and raised in Tripoli, Lebanon. In 1984, she enrolled at the American University of Beirut (AUB), where she earned a Bachelor of Science in chemistry in 1987, followed by a Teaching Diploma in science education for the secondary level in the same year. She went on to earn a Master of Arts in Science Education in 1990.

Rima then pursued further studies at Portland State University in Portland, Oregon, US, where she earned a Doctorate in Education (Ed.D.) in 1997, specializing in K-12 Educational Administration and Supervision.

== Career ==
Rima Karami joined the American University of Beirut (AUB) in 2007 as an assistant professor. She was then promoted to associate professor in 2020 with tenure and served as the chairperson of the Department of Education. During this time, Rima worked on enhancing the department's academic programs.

In 2007, Rima also joined in directing the TAMAM Project, a groundbreaking initiative focused on school-based reform in the Arab world. She is currently the sole director and the principal investigator of the project, which spans 67 schools across eight Arab countries and aims to enhance leadership skills for sustainable school improvement. Under her leadership, TAMAM has secured funding from organizations such as the Arab Thought Foundation, LORE Foundation, Taawon Association, and Al Maymouna Organization. TAMAM was also awarded the 2021-2022 UNESCO-HAMDAN Prize for Teacher Development, recognizing its impact on advancing teacher leadership and education.

In addition to her teaching and leadership roles at AUB, Rima has been involved in numerous committees and initiatives. She served as the editor for special issues of Manhajiyat, an interactive electronic educational journal, since July 2021. The journal focuses on exploring learning across all school levels, from early childhood to grade 12. She also chaired the executive committee of the Shamaa Database, where she managed a range of responsibilities, including approving work programs and budgets, making decisions on development plans, securing funding, appointing committee and administrative staff, and forming working groups. Rima is an active member of the Lebanese Association for Educational Studies (LAES), which was founded in 1995. LAES is a non-profit organization focused on improving Lebanon's education system.

On February 8, 2025, Dr. Rima Karami was appointed as Minister of Education and Higher Education in Lebanon.

== Examples of her Research ==
Rima's research primarily focuses on school leadership, professional development, educational policy, and organizational change in the context of the Arab world. Some key areas of her research include:

=== Refereed journal publications ===
- Karami Akkary, R. (2014). Facing the challenges of educational reform in the Arab world. Journal of Educational Change, 15, 179–202.
- Ghosn, E., & Akkary, R. K. (2020). The struggle of Lebanese teacher unions in a neoliberal period. Research in Educational Administration and Leadership, 5(1), 275–322.
- Karami-Akkary, R. (2019). Evaluating teacher professional learning in the Arab region; the experience of the TAMAM project. Teaching and Teacher Education, 85, 137–147.
- Akkary, R. K., & DeKnight, J. (2019). Rethinking Design-Based Approaches for School-Based Improvement: The Experience of the TAMAM Project. International Journal of Educational Reform, 28(1), 99–121.

=== Books and book chapters ===
- Karami-Akkary, R. and Khattab, Y. "TAMAM model for Building Leadership Capacity for School-Based Reform in the Arab Region. In E. Anderson, & S. D. Hayes (Eds.), Continuous Improvement: A Leadership Process for School Improvement, 2023.
- Mahfouz, J. and Karami-Akkary, R. "Principalship in Lebanon: The unsung heroes". In K. Arar, S. Turan, S. Gümüs, A. Sellami, & J. Mahfouz (Eds.), Demystifying Educational Leadership and Administration in the Middle East and North Africa: Challenges and Prospects, Abingdon, UK: Routledge, 2023.
