= Marwan Charbel =

Lebanese military officer and politician (born 1947)

Minister of Interior and Municipalities
- In office 13 June 2011 – 15 February 2014
- Prime Minister: Najib Mikati
- Preceded by: Ziyad Baroud
- Succeeded by: Nohad Machnouk

Personal details
- Born: 1947 (age 78–79)
- Children: 3
- Education: Lebanese Army Military Academy; Lebanese University

Military service
- Rank: Brigadier general

Marwan Charbel (Arabic: مروان شربل; born 1947) is a retired Lebanese brigadier general and the former minister of interior and municipalities between 2011 and 2014.

== Early life and education ==
Charbel was born in 1947. He entered the military academy in 1968 and graduated as a lieutenant in 1971. Then he obtained a bachelor's degree in law from Lebanese University in 1981.

== Career ==
Charbel served in various units of the Internal Security Forces. Then he became a major general in the Internal Security Forces. He was the adviser of caretaker interior minister Ziyad Baroud.

In June 2011, he was appointed minister of interior and municipalities to the cabinet led by prime minister Najib Mikati, replacing Ziyad Baroud in the post. Charbel was part of the group appointed by President Michel Suleiman in the cabinet. His appointment was one of the major points significantly discussed during the negotiation process for the establishment of the cabinet. He was considered to be a friends with both the Lebanese president Michel Sulaiman and the Free Patriotic Movement (FPM) leader Michel Aoun. In fact, he was seen as a member of FPM.

In 2011, Charbel proposed the hybrid-system reform in regard to legislative elections to be held in 2013. In February 2014, Charbel's term ended when Nouhad Machnouk was appointed to the post.

== Personal life ==
Charbel is married and has two sons and a daughter.

== Controversy ==
In early May 2013 Charbel stated on Al Jadeed TV that Lebanon was opposed to homosexuals (using the derogatory Arabic term for homosexuals, 'liwat') and that homosexuality was a felony in Lebanon. These remarks followed shortly after the controversial raid and closing of a gay-friendly nightclub in Dekwaneh during which it is reported that several gay men and a transgender woman were falsely arrested and abused by security forces acting on the direct instructions of the mayor of Dekwaneh, Antoine Chakhtoura. Charbel's office subsequently posted a clarification on Facebook that Charbel was not passing a judgment, but was merely stating that while gay marriage was recently legalized in France it was still prohibited in Lebanon.

Political offices
Preceded by Ziyad Baroud	Interior Minister of Lebanon; 2011-2013	Succeeded by Nouhad Machnouk
