= Fayez Ghosn =

Lebanese politician (1950–2021)

Minister of Defense
- In office 13 June 2011 – 15 February 2014
- Prime Minister: Najib Mikati
- Preceded by: Elias Murr
- Succeeded by: Samir Mouqbel

Personal details
- Born: 28 June 1950 Kousba, Lebanon
- Died: 22 November 2021 (aged 71)
- Party: Marada Party
- Spouse: Yona Hakim
- Children: Two

Fayez Ghosn (Arabic: فايز غصن; 28 June 1950 – 22 November 2021) was a Lebanese politician who served as a minister of defense, and a member of the Marada Movement.

== Early life ==
Ghosn was from an influential Orthodox Christian family with origins in Northern Lebanon. He was born in Kousba on 28 June 1950.

== Career ==
Ghosn was a member of the Lebanon's Christian political party Marada, which is a supporter of Hezbollah. He first became a parliament member following the 1996 elections. He also won a seat from Koura in the general elections of 2000. He chaired the Lebanese Parliament’s budget and finance committee in 2000. In the 2005 general elections, he was on a list of candidates backed by Michel Aoun. In the general elections of 2009, Ghosn ran for a seat from Koura, but he could not win the election.

Ghosn was appointed minister of defense in June 2011. He was part of the 8 March coalition and the Change and Reform bloc in Najib Mikati's cabinet. Ghosn's term ended on 15 February 2014, and Samir Mouqbel replaced him as defense minister. In the general elections in 2018 he again ran for a seat from Koura and was elected.

=== Views ===
Ghosn was a supporter of Iran, arguing that Iran contributes to stability in the Middle East countries. In December 2011, Ghosn claimed that Al Qaeda militants were entering Lebanon under the guise of Syrian opposition members.

== Personal life and death ==
Ghosn married Yona Hakim, the daughter of former lawmaker Bakhos Hakim. They had two children.

He died on 22 November 2021.

Political offices
Preceded by Elias Murr	Minister of Defense; 2011 – 2014	Succeeded by Samir Mouqbel
