= Alaaeddine Terro =

Lebanese politician (born 1953)

Minister for the Displaced
- In office 13 June 2011 – 14 February 2014
- Prime Minister: Najib Mikati
- Preceded by: Akram Chehayeb

Personal details
- Born: 1953 (age 72–73) Barja
- Party: Progressive Socialist Party
- Spouse: Fatima Al Khatib
- Children: 2

Alaaddine Terro (born 1953; Arabic: علاء الدين ترو) is a Lebanese politician who is a member of the Progressive Socialist Party and minister for the displaced.

== Early life ==
Terro was born into a Sunni Muslim family in Barja, the Chouf district, in 1953.

== Career ==
Terro joined the Progressive Socialist Party in 1975. He firstly won a seat from the Chouf district, the fourth district of north Lebanon, in the general elections held in 1992. He also joined the Democratic Gathering bloc in 1992 and has been part of it since then. Terro also won the same seat in the general elections of 2000. He was on the March 14 alliance’s electoral list in the Chouf district proposed by Walid Jumblatt, leader of the Progressive Socialist Party in the 2009 general elections of Lebanon. And Terro won the election. Then he was appointed minister for the displaced to the cabinet led by prime minister Najib Mikati on 11 June 2011, replacing Akram Chehayeb. As a member of the Progressive Socialist Party, he is one of the three ministers appointed by the party's leader Walid Jumblatt to the cabinet. In other words, Terro is part of the National Struggle Front in the cabinet.

== Personal life ==
Terro is married to Fatima Al Khatib and has two children from his current wife, as well as one from a previous marriage.

Political offices
| Preceded by Akram Chehayeb | Minister for the Displaced; 2011–2014 | Succeeded by NA |
