= Ziyad Baroud =

Lebanese politician

Ziyad Baroud زياد بارود
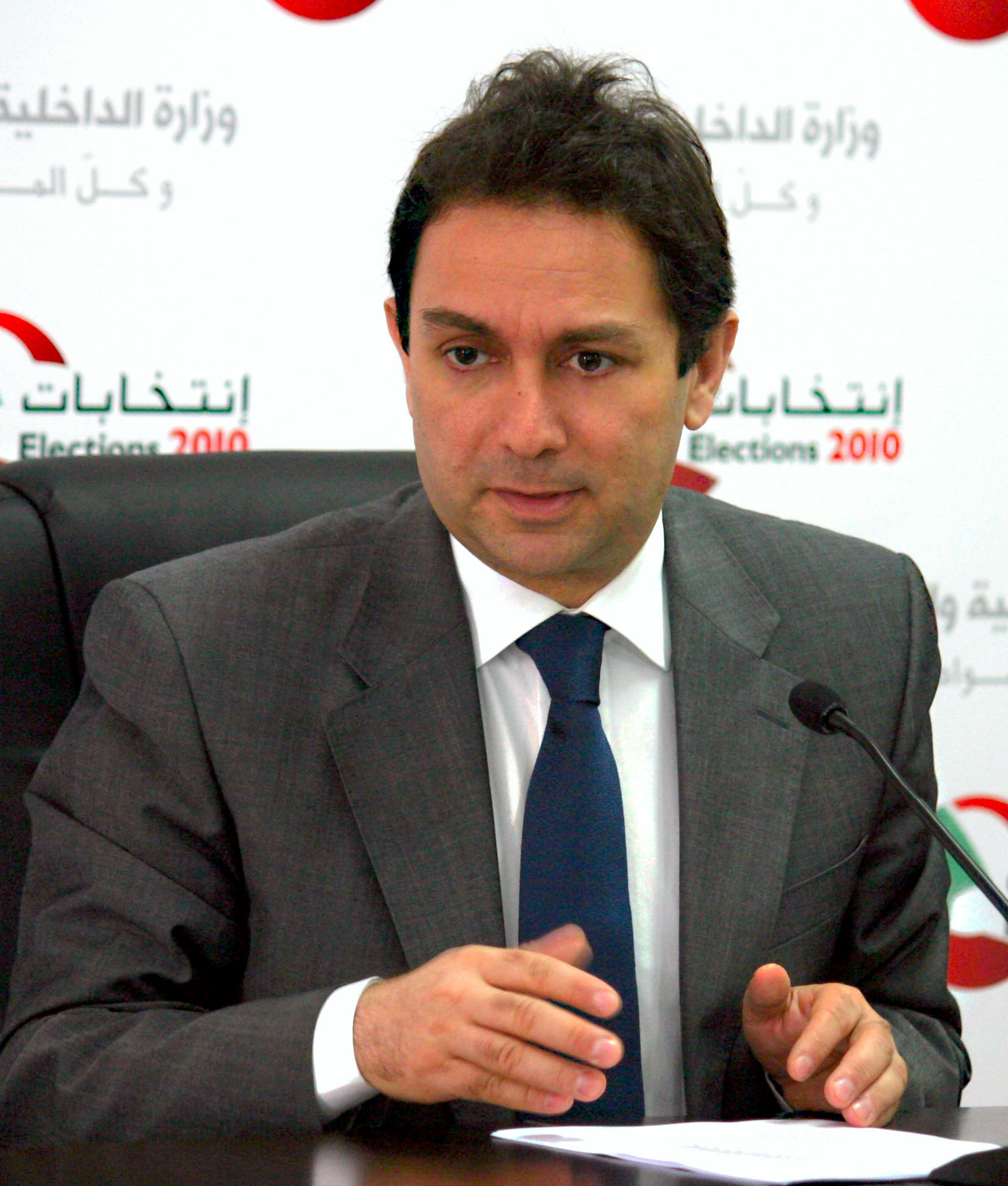
- Baroud during the 2010 municipal elections

Minister of Interior and Municipalities
- In office 11 July 2008 – 13 June 2011
- President: Michel Sleiman
- Prime Minister: Fuad Siniora first term Saad Hariri second term
- Preceded by: Hassan Sabeh
- Succeeded by: Marwan Charbel

Personal details
- Born: 29 April 1970 (age 56) Jeita, Lebanon
- Party: Independent
- Spouse: Linda Karam
- Children: 3
- Profession: Lawyer

Ziyad Baroud (Arabic: زياد بارود /ziːˈjæd bɑːˈruːd/; born 29 April 1970) is a French Lebanese civil servant and civil society activist. He served as minister of interior and municipalities from 2008 to 2011 for two consecutive cabinets in both Fuad Siniora and Saad Hariri's governments.

An attorney by practice, Baroud focuses on issues of decentralization and electoral law reform. He is known to abstain from engaging in feudal politics, and to focus instead on building the Lebanese civil society and Lebanese civil institutions. During his mandate as minister of interior, Baroud was credited for pushing forward a culture of responsibility and openness where he made himself easily accessible to all Lebanese citizens eager to share complaints and/or opinions, and was widely present in day-to-day activities of his subordinates. His actions resulted in an unpremeditated cultivation of a very attractive public image that he still possesses today.

Baroud was also credited with overseeing Lebanon's best-managed round of elections to date in 2009, which he orchestrated in one day instead of the conventional four weekends, a record in Lebanese history. This has earned him the First Prize of the prestigious United Nations Public Service Award where Lebanon was ranked first among 400 government administrations from all over the world by the United Nations Public Administration Network (UNPAN).

On 26 May 2011, Baroud resigned from office as minister of interior and municipalities in Saad Hariri's government after an inter-party conflict developed between the Internal Security Forces and the Ministry of Telecommunications in Lebanon.

In 2010, Baroud was the recipient of the International Foundation for Electoral Systems (IFES) Charles T. Manatt Democracy Award, which recognizes extraordinary efforts to advance electoral participation and democratic values. He is also the recipient of the distinction of the French Legion of Honor or Légion d'Honneur, the highest decoration in France, ranking him as Chevalier, and of the Grand Cross of the Spanish Order of Civil Merit (Sp: Orden del Mérito Civil) rewarded for "extraordinary service for the benefit of Spain".

== Early life and education ==
Baroud was born on 29 April 1970 in Jeita, Keserwan into Maronite family of Selim and Antoinette (née Salem). The first of two children, Baroud and his younger sister Maha were brought up in a middle-class civil household with no political ancestry, where both parents were high school teachers; their father a senior grade mathematics teacher and their mother an Arabic literature teacher. Baroud completed his high school education at Collège Saint Joseph – Antoura des Pères Lazaristes from which he graduated in 1988. He then attended the Faculty of Law at Saint Joseph University in Beirut from which he earned his Master's Degree in Law. He was admitted to the Beirut Bar Association in 1993.

From 1993 to 1996, Baroud worked as a trainee lawyer in Beirut in the cabinet of Ibrahim Najjar, who later served as minister of justice in the same government as Baroud. While working in the office of Najjar, Baroud contributed along with a handful of judges and fellow lawyers to the drafting of a legal monthly supplement in An-Nahar "Houqouq Annas" (Ar: حقوق الناس) or "People's Rights", the first of its kind, designed to familiarize people with judiciary rights and jargon and promote the implementation and modernization of Lebanese laws with the aim of bringing more justice to society. At the same time, Baroud was pursuing doctoral studies at the University of Paris X in Paris, France, a school that also graduated Nicolas Sarkozy and Dominique de Villepin among other influential personalities. Baroud is currently preparing his doctoral thesis on the subject of "Decentralization in Lebanon after the Taif Agreement", a topic that is one of his main subjects of expertise as well as one of the major lobbying points of his political agenda.

== Career and policymaking activities ==
Baroud held a number of academic posts as lecturer in two prestigious universities in Lebanon: His alma mater Université Saint Joseph (USJ) and Université Saint-Esprit de Kaslik (USEK). Furthermore, he sits today on the Board of Trustees of Notre Dame University.

With time, Baroud became more and more involved in key public actions that took him to the forefront of national, high-profile political activism, largely due to his expertise on many impending national topics, notably electoral law, decentralization and the constitution.

Electoral reform

In March 1996, Baroud founded, along with other activists, the Lebanese Association for Democratic Elections (LADE), an independent, nonprofit organization specialized in the study of elections and electoral laws' impact on democracy.

In 2004, he was elected Secretary General of LADE to lead a group of more than 1,300 domestic electoral observers during the 2005 elections.

Two years later, he was chosen to serve as a board member of the Lebanese chapter of Transparency International (LTA). In 2005–2006, he was commissioned by the Prime Minister of the Republic Fuad Siniora along with eleven others to serve on a blue-ribbon commission headed by Former Minister Fouad Boutros to propose a draft for electoral law reform, this commission came to be familiarly known as the "Boutros Commission".

The Boutros Commission
In 2005, the new cabinet headed by Prime Minister Fuad Siniora launched an independent commission on 8 August 2005 headed by Former Foreign Minister Fouad Boutros to study the dire issue of the 2000 electoral law and propose a change. The commission was named the "Lebanese National Commission on Electoral Law", more casually known as the "Boutros Commission." Twelve people, six Muslims and six Christians, were appointed, of which Baroud was chosen to be one of the key expert members. Other members included: Fouad Boutros (President), Ghaleb Mahmassany, Michel Tabet, Zouheir Chokr, Ghassan Abou Alwan, Nawaf Salam, Abdel Salam Sheaib, Fayez Al-Hajj Shahine, Paul Salem, Khaldoun Naja, and Arda Ekmekji.
The commission met for nine months and delivered a 129-article draft law for comprehensive electoral reform to the cabinet on 31 May 2006. The 129 articles detailed a myriad of reforms including lowering the voting age to 18 years, implementing an electoral list quota of 30% female candidates, an assessment of absentee balloting for Lebanese abroad, and the implementation of comprehensive and tight regulations for political campaigns and their financial spendings, among other things.
Unfortunately, the cabinet ran out of time before it had a chance to vote on the Boutros Commission's proposal. Five weeks later, the July War broke out in July 2006 before the law could be sent to parliament. The subsequent deterioration of the political situation and closing of the legislature prevented any proposed reforms from being addressed, and remained pending.

Decentralization

Baroud worked as a research associate at the "Lebanese Center for Policy Studies", a Beirut-based think tank of which he is a board member today. LCPS aims to provide researched, politically neutral guidelines to serve policymaking. Baroud also consulted with the UNDP on local governance and decentralization from 2001 to 2008. He is currently the chairman of the "Governmental Committee of Decentralization" (Ar: اللجنة الخاصة باللامركزية), knowing that the topic of decentralization happens to be his Doctorate Thesis subject.

== Minister of the interior and municipalities ==
Following the deadly clashes of May 2008, on 21 May 2008, figures from both the opposition and majority signed the Doha Agreement under the auspices of Qatar's foreign minister and prime minister Sheikh Hamad bin Jassim bin Jaber al-Thani, finally diffusing an 18-month crisis. The Doha negotiations resulted in the long-awaited election of General Michel Sleiman as President of the Lebanese Republic and the formation of the 70th national unity government led by Prime Minister Fuad Siniora, composed of 30 ministers distributed among the majority (16 ministers), the opposition (11 ministers) and the president (3 ministers).

Newly elected President Michel Sleiman named Baroud as Minister of Interior and Municipalities.

Baroud served as Minister of Interior and Municipalities under two consecutive cabinets. The first cabinet led by Prime Minister Fuad Siniora in the 70th national unity government which lasted from 11 July 2008, until November 2009. Baroud successively served for a second term under Prime Minister Saad Hariri's cabinet which lasted from 9 Nov 2009 to 13 June 2011, though he had resigned on 26 May 2011.

=== Enforcing traffic laws ===
The first crackdown Baroud orchestrated was on traffic disobedience. Working closely with NGOs that promote road safety and injury prevention, notably the Youth Association for Social Awareness (YASA) and Kun Hadi (Arabic for "Be Calm", as well as a play on the word "Hadi" which is the name of a young man who died in a speeding car accident and namesake of the organization), one of Baroud's first undertakings as minister was to impose traffic laws, including seatbelt enforcement and speed limits compliance. Resultantly, under his mandate, in the first year alone, the Ministry of Interior raised the number of traffic officers from 593 to 1,800. 87% of motorists started complying with traffic lights. 32,323 illegal motorcycles were confiscated. A decline of 77% in car thefts was recorded. All of the above were records in the history of the Ministry of Interior and Municipalities (MoIM).

Time magazine published an article citing the importance of Baroud's undertakings regarding traffic laws: "Unable to solve the big problems facing the country, Ziad Baroud, Suleiman's choice to lead the powerful Ministry of the Interior, began focusing on problems that might actually make a difference in the lives of average Lebanese. In particular, the police began cracking down on the single biggest cause of death in the country: not terrorism, or war, but traffic accidents."

=== Supporting freedom of association ===
Being an avid civil society activist and a human rights campaigner, Baroud has been known to support and actively encourage the work of Lebanon's Non-Governmental Organizations (NGOs). Thus, a major undertaking tackled by Baroud was signing off on counts of registration applications from NGOs that had been stacking up for years and never accorded registration permits. Baroud released a circular facilitating the registration of NGOs. The number of NGOs approved under Baroud rates as one of the highest in the history of the Interior Ministry.

=== Privacy of religious identity ===
Baroud is the first government official to grant religious freedom of choice to Lebanese citizens on civil documents. Although Lebanese new identification cards issued post-civil war do not state citizens' religious affiliation, individual civil registry records still maintained the obligation for religious disclosure.

Baroud thus issued a circular in February 2009 decreeing that every Lebanese citizen was now free to cross out his/her religious identity from all official documents, and replace it with a slash sign (/) if they desire.

Baroud stated that such freedom allocation is simply consistent with the Lebanese Constitution and the Universal Declaration of Human Rights.

=== Monitoring of the "best managed elections" to date ===
For several years, the Civil Campaign for Electoral Reform (CCER), a broad alliance for civil society associations founded in 2005 by Baroud among others, was demanding that the parliament hold parliamentary elections over the course of one day. Although the Administration and Justice parliamentarian commission wanted to try and hold the 2009 elections over two days for security reasons, Baroud made great efforts to resolve all logistical difficulties in order to hold the elections in one day.

The 2009 Parliamentary Elections were consequently held over the course of one day, on 7 June 2009. The March 14 Alliance beat the opposition bloc of the March 8 Alliance winning 71 seats in the 128-member parliament to 57 seats going to the latter. This result is virtually the same as the result from the 2005 elections, yet the turnout is said to have been as high as 55%.

Former US President Jimmy Carter with the Carter Center Observation Mission issued a report "[commending] the Lebanese people and the electoral authorities for the successful conduct of the 2009 parliamentary elections". The report stated that "Minister Baroud earned the confidence of Lebanese stakeholders through his commitment to a transparent process." While the process fell short of several of Lebanon's international commitments, most notably secrecy of the ballot, they stated that "it was conducted with enhanced transparency." The report also commended the high levels of voter participation as well as the "high level of professionalism being exhibited by polling staff in most of the stations visited." The Carter Center final report can be found here.

The European Union, who also had established a mission to observe the 2009 Lebanese legislative elections, also issued a positive report stating that "the high level of trust in the electoral process was certainly assisted by the clear neutrality and professionalism of the Ministry of Interior in its administration of the elections, and especially by Minister Zyad [sic] Baroud himself." They point out that this neutrality is however not institutional, since it is more likely linked to the persona of Baroud, and therefore "cannot be guaranteed for the next elections". The European Union's final report on 7 June 2009 Parliamentary Elections can be found here.

Furthermore, as head of the newly formed Elections Oversight Council (OSC) which had been charged with organizing all public elections in Lebanon, Baroud's performance rating in public office was second only to Lebanese President Michel Sleiman according to public opinion polls.

=== Second term ===
The elections results, though acknowledged transparent and constitutional by both the Carter Center and the European Union, caused turmoil and resistance on behalf of the 8 March blockade who once again were not happy with the minority stake they would have in the cabinet. Lebanon stayed without a functioning government for the duration of four months, a time that was ridden with political wrangling over the formation of a national unity government. Eventually, the two sides finally agreed on the assignment of portfolios after concessions were made. Fifteen ministers were selected by the March 14 Alliance, ten by the opposition March 8 Alliance, and five were allotted to President Michel Sleiman. This formula denied 14 March from upholding a majority of cabinet posts while also preventing the opposition from exercising veto, a power which requires 11 cabinet posts ("a third plus one"). Thus, theoretically, the ministers selected by President Sleiman, considered impartial, hold the balance of power in cabinet with a swing vote on decision-making. Baroud was once again assigned as Minister of the Interior for a second term on 9 November 2009.

Due to the highly politicized and contentious atmosphere, Baroud's freedom of action as a Minister was severely reduced because of political wranglings he refused to get involved in. The contention between the 8 March and March 14 alliances often left him with no authority over policies and many of the security-related areas that he is supposed to constitutionally oversee, and eventually led to his resignation.

=== Resignation from minister of interior post ===
There are conflicting reports on why Baroud resigned from his ministerial duties. The basic storyline, however, draws on a series of skirmishes that occurred in a one-day public showdown between different loyalists of the country's two conflicting parties of 8 March and 14 March. The dispute involved two different branches of the Internal Security Forces who had violated Minister Baroud's authority, and the Minister of Telecommunications Charbel Nahas. The dispute escalated into an 8 – 14 March diplomatic proxy war that was unlawfully fought on grounds belonging to Minister Baroud's jurisdiction.

The event was highly publicized. Television stations had caught the entire showdown on cameras. Nahas then accused the ISF and 14 March of plotting a "coup d'Etat" against the state, and asked the Lebanese army to intervene. Head of the Lebanese Internal Security Forces (ISF) Ashraf Rifi and 14 March responded by accusing the Telecommunications Ministry of launching a coup against the executive branch of the Lebanese government, their pretext being that the equipment at hand had been installed in 2007 by a directive ordained by the Lebanese government, and thus only cabinet-level authority were allowed to give directives to dismantle it.

As a result, that same day of 26 May 2011, Baroud announced that he would no longer continue his ministerial duties. He famously stated that he had just "witnessed, along with the Lebanese people, the breakdown of the Lebanese state" Baroud also said that he tried for three years to serve the country, but that there was no longer a reason to do so since the Constitution was being trespassed.

In his resignation speech, Baroud said:

"I sought to be a servant of the Republic independent of any political affiliation despite the criticism and challenges, however, it was shown that the logic was missing elsewhere, and I realized, after attempting to prevent the explosion, that the problem is greater than its face value and I therefore refuse to be a false witness.
Because I refuse to be a caretaker minister, whose role is limited to executing ministry tasks by signing off the ministry's ordinary mail, while the authority he constitutionally holds over certain directorates that report to him gets reduced to just a legal, broken text;
Because disciplined behavior does not seem to reap any benefit anymore;
Because I refuse that the Constitution be violated through the creation of such antecedents that give permission to anybody to collapse the powers of the Minister, be it any Minister;
Because I will not take, nor have I ever taken, sides in a conflict that will carry the country to inevitable perils. I say all this independently of any lined political position, for the political team to which Minister Charbel Nahas belongs has not spared me, just like there is no rivalry between me and their opponent team but only cordiality and mutual respect with both teams.
In light of all of the above, and in order for my presence at the Ministry of Interior and Municipalities not to be limited to processing mail or so, and since the Minister of Interior and Municipalities by proxy can carry out the management, or facilitation, of these tasks while safeguarding the interests of the people, I, therefore, declare my loyalty to the Constitution, with the law as my reference, and I say to the Lebanese people that taking them, or taking all of us, hostage is no longer acceptable. I have, thus, freed myself from being captive of this position, or whatever it has been transformed to, hoping that the language of wisdom shall govern all and save whatever remains of the power of the state, its institutions, and the civil peace that I so fear for."

In the history of Lebanon, Ziyad Baroud is the second Minister of the Interior to ever resign from ministerial duties (the other was minister Al Sabeh in 2006 following the Austrian embassy in Ashrafiyeh event) .

== Public image ==
Baroud is a highly respected and admired figure in Lebanon, known for his accessibility and engagement with the public. He is known to have personally responded to citizens' emails and interacted with traffic offenders. Baroud took initiative by addressing traffic violations directly, standing at security checkpoints to discuss the importance of traffic laws with young speeders, and facilitating their participation in the "Kun Hadi" association to raise awareness about the dangers of reckless driving. His reputation extends to political leaders, with Maronite Patriarch Bechara Boutros Al-Rai describing him as "a national minister and the hope for every Lebanese person." Baroud also garnered support from political bloggers, particularly following his resignation, which prompted numerous favorable articles about his tenure.

A notable incident in December 2009, popularized by a blog, relates that during a traffic jam caused by police preparations for the Beirut Marathon, Baroud exited his car and directed traffic himself, diverging from the typical behavior of high-ranking officials.

== Personal life ==
Baroud is married to Linda Karam, a fellow lawyer. They have three children together: one son, Teo-Raphael, and two daughters, Elsa-Karol and Ayla-Maria.

== Memberships ==
- Beirut Bar Association since 1993
- Member of the Board of Trustees of Notre Dame University
- UNDP Legal Consultant on local governance
- Secretary General of the Lebanese Association for Democratic Elections (LADE) (2004–2005)
- Member of the National Commission on Electoral Reform, known as Boutros Commission
- Member of the Board of the Lebanese Center for Policy Studies (LCPS)
- Lecturer in Law at Université Saint Joseph (USJ)
- Lecturer in the Master degree of Road safety Management at Université Saint Joseph (USJ)
- Board member of the Faculty of Law at Saint Joseph University
- Chairman of the Lebanese Governmental Commission on Decentralization

== Awards ==
- In July 2011, he was conferred the Silver Order Star insignia of the Spanish Order of Civil Merit in the rank of Commander by Number (Encomienda de Número) by the King of Spain Juan Carlos I, in courteous appreciation of Baroud's civic virtues in service for Spain.
- Under Ziyad Baroud's leadership, the Ministry of Interior and Municipalities (MoIM) was awarded the prestigious 2010 First Prize of the United Nations Public Service Award. The award, considered one of the most prestigious honors for public service, was awarded to Lebanon out of 400 international public administrations. The United Nations Public Administration Network (UNPAN) ranked Lebanon first mainly for the Interior Ministry's work during the 2009 parliamentary elections.
- In September 2010, the International Foundation for Electoral Systems (IFES) awarded Ziyad Baroud the "2010 IFES Charles T. Manatt Democracy Award" as a tribute to his commitment to freedom and democracy. The IFES awards, which recognize extraordinary efforts to advance electoral participation and democratic values, are given yearly to an American Republican, an American Democrat and a member of the international community to highlight the fact that democracy work transcends political parties and national borders. The awards took place on 28 September 2010, in Washington, DC.
- In October 2011, he was awarded "Officier de la Légion d'Honneur" in the rank of Chevalier by the French President Nicolas Sarkozy for his civic achievements. The Order is the highest decoration in France.
- In 2009, he was awarded "Grand Officier de L'Ordre National du Mérite de la République Française" in the rank of Commandeur by the Republic of France.
- In December 2009, he was named 2010 Man of the Year by Capital Issues newspaper and Data & Investment Consult-Lebanon.
- In 2007, he was named Young Global Leader by the World Economic Forum. An award which "recognizes and acknowledges the professional accomplishment, commitment to society and their potential to contribute to shaping the future of the world of the top 250 young leaders from around the world."
