= Akram Chehayeb =

Lebanese Druze politician

- أكرم شهيب
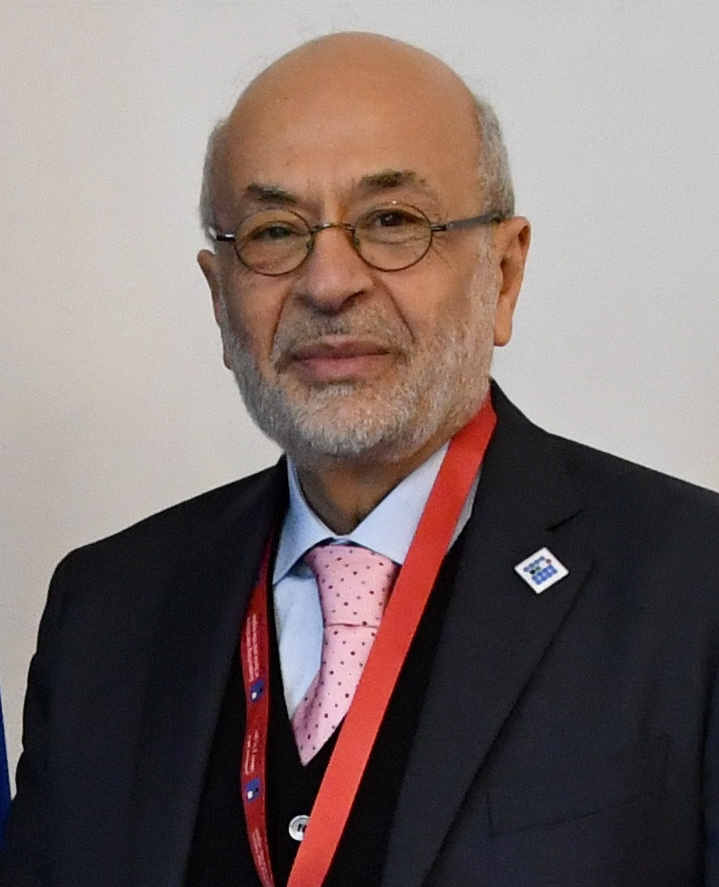
- Chehayeb in 2019

Minister of Education and Higher Learning
- In office 1 February 2019 – 21 January 2020
- Prime Minister: Saad Hariri
- Preceded by: Marwan Hamadeh
- Succeeded by: Tarek Majzoub

Minister of Agriculture
- In office 15 February 2014 – 18 December 2016
- Prime Minister: Tammam Salam

Minister of Displaced
- In office 9 November 2009 – 13 June 2011
- Prime Minister: Saad Hariri
- Preceded by: Raymond Audi
- Succeeded by: Alaaeddine Terro

Minister of Environment
- In office 20 February 1996 – 29 November 1998
- Prime Minister: Rafic Hariri

Personal details
- Born: 17 October 1947 (age 78) Aley, Lebanon
- Party: Progressive Socialist Party
- Spouse: Salma J.Chehayeb
- Education: Arab University of Beirut; Cairo University Lebanese University

Akram Hussein Chehayeb (Arabic: أكرم شهيب; born 17 October 1947) is a Lebanese Druze politician who is a member of the Progressive Socialist Party headed by Walid Jumblatt. Cheheyab is a long-term member of the parliament and has also served in different cabinet and parliamentary posts.

== Early life and education ==
Chehayeb was born in Aley on 17 October 1947. He received a bachelor's degree in biology from the Arab University of Beirut and a master's degree in history from Cairo University in 1982.

== Career ==
Chehayeb was a supporter of the Baath party and Saddam Hussein during his youth. Then he became a member of the Progressive Socialist Party (PSP) in 1979. He worked as a history professor at Lebanese University in Aley. In 1984, he became office manager of Jumblatt. From 1985 to 1991 he served as the director of the PSP in Damascus. In 1992, he won the election, being a representative for Beirut. In the 1996 elections, Chehayeb won the Druze seat in Aley. Chahayeb served as minister of environment from 1996 to 1998. He also won the same seat in the general elections of 2000. From 2005 to 2009 he was the head of Lebanese environment committee. In 2009, he was appointed minister of displaced to the cabinet headed by then prime minister Saad Hariri, replacing Raymond Audi. Chehayeb's tenure ended in 2011, and he was succeeded by Alaaeddine Terro as minister.

Chehayeb also won Druze seat in Aley in the 2009 general election, and is part of the National Struggle Front bloc, which is under the control of Walid Jumblatt.

In February 2013 Akram Chehayeb became part of Tammam Salam's government as minister of agriculture. His term ended on 18 December 2016 when a new government led by Saad Hariri was formed.

== Personal life ==
Chehayeb is married to Salma Jurdi Chehayeb and has four children.

Political offices
Preceded by Raymond Audi	Minister for the Displaced; 2009–2011	Succeeded by Alaaeddine Terro
