= Nohad Machnouk =

Lebanese politician (born 1955)

- نهاد المشنوق
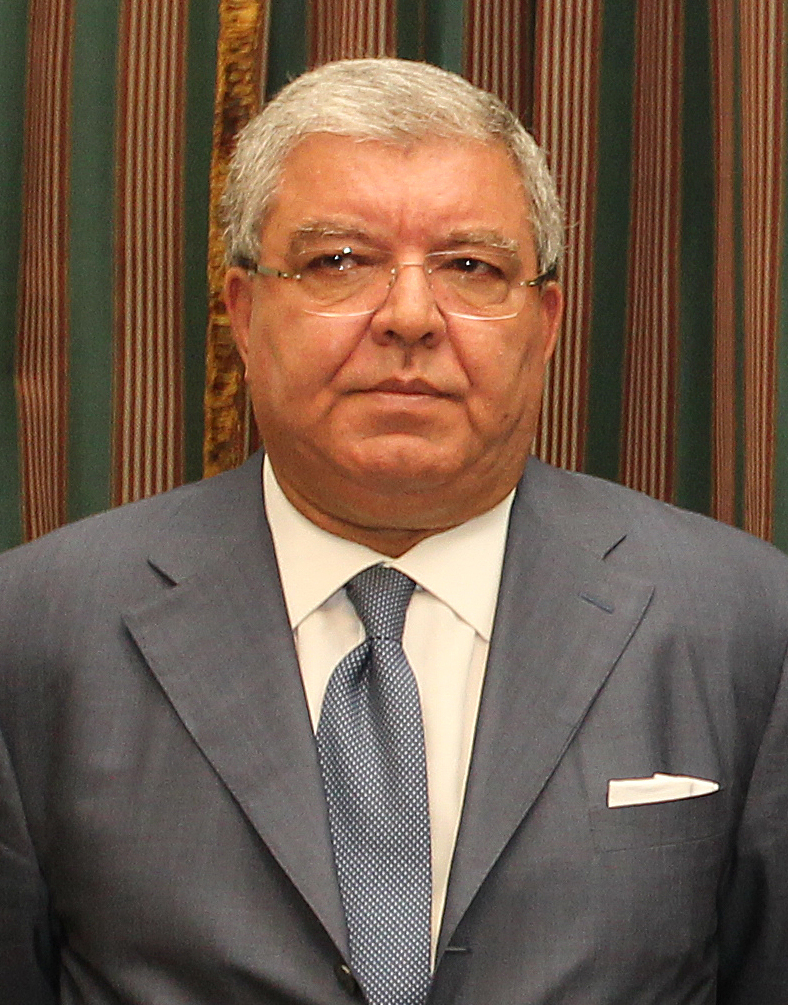
- Nohad Machnouk in 2015

Minister of Interior and Municipalities
- In office 15 February 2014 – 31 January 2019
- Preceded by: Marwan Charbel
- Succeeded by: Raya Haffar El Hassan

Personal details
- Born: 1955
- Political party: Future Movement
- Cabinet: Salam; Hariri II

Nohad Machnouk (or Machnouq, Arabic: نهاد المشنوق; born 1955) is a Lebanese politician who was the Lebanese Minister of Interior and Municipalities and a Member of Parliament representing Beirut’s second district. He is a member of the “Future Bloc” coalition and serves on the Human Rights and Foreign Affairs parliamentary committees. He also serves on the ministerial committee charged with responding to the Syrian refugee crisis.

== Early life ==
Machnouk was born in Beirut, Lebanon, in 1955, to a Sunni Muslim family that traces its roots to Hama, Syria. After starting his career as a journalist, El Machnouk was hired by Lebanese weekly magazine Annahar and wrote extensively on regional issues.

== Political career ==
In 1983, he assumed his first political role as co-founder of Al Liqa’ al-Islami ("The Islamic Meeting"), a political gathering of prominent politicians and civil society leaders that called for an end to Syrian dominance of Lebanon and a halt to civil conflict.

In 1992, he was appointed senior political advisor to Prime Minister Rafic Hariri. He served in this position until 1998, when he was forced into exile by the Syrian intelligence apparatus for his efforts to reduce Syrian tutelage of the country. Upon the withdrawal of Syrian troops in 2005, he resumed his journalistic career as a weekly columnist for Lebanese daily Assafir, before running for parliament in 2009. In 2014, he was named Minister of Interior and Municipalities in Tammam Salam’s national unity government.

As minister, he devised and implemented a comprehensive security strategy to gradually impose state sovereignty on all the Lebanese territory. This put an end to the rounds of sectarian infighting that had taken place in North Lebanon for a decade and helped dismantle the criminal networks that served as support infrastructures for terrorist groups operating in the northeast of the country.

In December 2016, Nohad El Machnouk was appointed Minister of Interior and Municipalities.

=== Beirut protests ===
On 22 August 2015, protesters took to the streets of Beirut demanding a resolution to the trash crisis, the protests led to a clash with the riot police who fired tear gas and water cannons at the protesters and shot rubber bullets directly at them and real bullets in the air. Hundreds of people were wounded in the events and the public demanded the prosecution of the responsible forces and the resignation of Machnouk.

Machnouk was abroad at the time of the protests. However, upon his return he defended officers involved in controlling the protests and rejected calls for his resignation, describing the aftermath of the protests as vandalism by rioters who had taken advantage of the chaos.

At the same time, Machnouk was criticized as a video clip was widely shared online and on Lebanese television, that appeared to show him dancing at a bar on the Greek island of Mykonos as the crisis escalated in Beirut.
