= Tarek Majzoub =

Lebanese politician, academic, and judge

- طارق المجذوب

Minister of Education and Higher Learning
- In office 21 January 2020 – 10 September 2021
- Prime Minister: Hassan Diab
- Preceded by: Akram Chehayeb
- Succeeded by: Abbas Halabi

Personal details
- Born: 21 January 1960 (age 66) Sidon, Lebanon
- Party: Independent
- Education: Lebanese University; American University of Beirut; University of Rennes 1
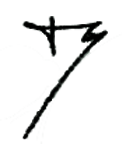
- Signature

Tarek Mohammed al-Majzoub (Arabic: طارق محمد المجذوب; born 21 January 1960) is a Lebanese judge and academic who served as Minister of Education from January 2020 to September 2021.

== Early years ==
Majzoub was born in Sidon, South Lebanon for a Sunni Muslim family. He finished his Secondary education in Beirut, then attended Lebanese University and got a degree in Law, and a Baccalaureus in engineering from the American University in Beirut. He later moved to France, where he finished his doctorate in Public Law, at University of Rennes 1.

== Career ==
He worked as a university professor and taught administrative law at the Faculty of Law at Al-Hikma University. He is an expert in international water affairs and has published articles in which he has studied water issues in the region, as well as other research and studies in several languages and fields. He is a consultant to a group of institutions, committees, and organizations, such as the League of the Arab States, the International Labor Organization, and the Food and Agriculture Organization. He served as a judge in the State Council.

== Minister of Education ==
In 2020, Majzoub was endorsed by Prime Minister Hassan Diab to be appointed as the minister of education in his cabinet. On 10 August 2020, the entire cabinet resigned and served in a caretaker capacity until a new government was formed.

On 5 July 2021, Tarek Majzoub canceled the Grade 9 (Brevet) official exams for the scholastic year 2020/2021 after canceling both Grade 9 (Brevet) and 12 (Terminale) exams the previous scholastic year 2019/2020.

== Publications ==
- History of Legal and Social Systems
- Public Administration: Administrative Process, Public Function and Administrative Reform
