= Contents of the United States diplomatic cables leak (Middle East) =

Content from the United States diplomatic cables leak has depicted the United States' opinion of the Middle East-related subjects extensively. WikiLeaks has published these classified documents, diplomatic cables, between the United States Department of State and its diplomatic missions around the world. Many previously unknown statements or opinions about a variety of Middle Eastern topics have been revealed.

== Algeria ==
In a cable dated 17 December 2007, to the US Secretary of State, the US Ambassador to Algeria, Robert Ford, summarized how former government officials, opposition leaders, and journalists "paint a picture of an Algerian regime that is fragile in ways it has not been before, plagued by a lack of vision, unprecedented levels of corruption and rumblings of division within the military rank and file".

== Bahrain ==
In cables dated between 16 February 2005 and 17 February 2009, the topics covered included threats to Arab solidarity, the assassination of Hariri, and Bahrain's desire to increase its television broadcasting capabilities.

=== Iran and Qatar conspiring to divide Arab interests ===
The Crown Prince Salman of Bahrain expressed worries that Iran is conspiring with Qatar, Hezbollah and Hamas to split Arab solidarity. Bahrain and other Arab governments lashed out at media reports that an Iranian official described Bahrain as "Iran's fourteenth province".

=== Hariri assassination blame falls on Syria ===
King Hamad had no doubt that Syria was behind the assassination of Rafic Hariri.

=== Bahrain wants to develop its TV/Radio capability ===
King Hamad said that he instructed Bahrain's minister of information Abdul-Ghaffar to seek help from the US to help Bahrain turn its television broadcasting into a world class operation.

== Egypt ==
In cables dated between 2008 and 2009, opinions are expressed on the declining state of the Egyptian military and the unwillingness of the Defense Minister Tantawi to accede to US suggestions of Egyptian human rights reform in return for US economic aid. They also touch on over a billion dollars' worth of military hardware sold to Egypt, to ensure peace with Israel as well as "priority access to the Suez canal and Egyptian airspace". They also include issues regarding the Iraq war and Egypt-Iran relations.

=== Defense Minister Tantawi ===
Defense Minister Tantawi was credited for his cooperation with Israel and helping maintain the blockade against Hamas, stating that the eighty-year-old veteran of five wars with Israel remains uninterested in another conflict. However, he was described as being extremely change resistant, uncooperative even with his own generals, and cannot comprehend with the post Camp David military paradigm which puts him, as well as his entire Soviet trained leadership, at odds with the younger, American Trained, generation of the Egyptian Military. Even mid-level officers at MOD clubs around Cairo openly complain about Tantawi (who is nicknamed "Mubarak's Poodle"), claiming that he is "running the military into the ground" and that he only has his job due to his unwavering loyalty to Mubarak. His inability to deal with the post 9/11 world is evident through his preference of spending U.S. aid on advanced tanks and fighter jets to fight old-fashioned, large-scale wars, something that continues to annoy David Petraeus. His views were summarized as being opposed to political or economic reform, willing to use the army to curb the Muslim Brotherhood, and rejecting U.S. efforts to condition economic aid on any human-rights reform.

=== Iraq War ===
Former Egyptian president, Hosni Mubarak told the US to find a "fair dictator" to rule Iraq. He explains, "Strengthen the Iraqi armed forces, relax your hold, and then you will have a coup. Then we will have a dictator, but a fair one."

=== Egypt-Iran relations ===
Mubarak expressed animosity toward Iran in private meetings, saying the Iranian leaders are "big, fat liars", and that Iran's backing of terrorism is "well-known". According to one US report, Mubarak views Iran as the primary long-term challenge facing Egypt, and an Egyptian official said that Iran is running agents inside Egypt in an effort to subvert the Egyptian regime.

== Jordan ==
=== Iran-Jordan relations ===
A diplomatic cable, dated 2 April 2009, quotes Zeid Rifai, president of the Jordanian Senate, as saying, "Bomb Iran, or live with an Iranian bomb. Sanctions, carrots, incentives won't matter", in a conversation with David Hale, US Ambassador to Jordan. The cable further states "while Rifai judged a military strike would have 'catastrophic impact on the region,' he nonetheless thought preventing Iran from acquiring nuclear weapons would pay enough dividends to make it worth the risks".

== Kuwait ==
In cables dated between February 2009 and November 2010, issues regarding Guantanamo Bay, Shi'ite fundamentalism, US military involvement in the Persian Gulf, and Kuwait-sponsored extremism were discussed.

=== Guantanamo Bay detainees ===
Emir of Kuwait Sheikh Sabah Al-Ahmad Al-Jaber Al-Sabah, referring to Kuwaiti Guantanamo detainees, said:

You know better than I that we cannot deal with these people (the Guantanamo detainees). I can't detain them. If I take their passports, they will sue to get them back. I can talk to you into next week about building a rehabilitation center, but it won't happen. We are not Saudi Arabia; we cannot isolate these people in desert camps or somewhere on an island. We cannot compel them to stay. If they are rotten, they are rotten and the best thing to do is get rid of them. You picked them up in Afghanistan; you should drop them off in Afghanistan, in the middle of the war zone.

=== Iran ===
Kuwait allegedly believes Iran was supporting Shia extremists in the Persian Gulf and the Shiite Houthis in Yemen.

=== US militarily helping Persian Gulf States ===
US military is assisting the Persian Gulf states in increasing ballistic missile and counter-air defenses, as well as providing early warning systems against the eventuality of an Iranian missile launch.

=== Kuwait based charities financing extremism ===
Al Qaeda and other groups continue to exploit Kuwait, both as a source of funds and as a key transit point.

== Lebanon ==
=== Lebanese Civil War ===
In a 1976 diplomatic cable released by WikiLeaks, a US diplomat stated "if I got nothing else from my meeting with Frangie, Chamoun and Gemayel, it is their clear, unequivocal and unmistakable belief that their principal hope for saving Christian necks is Syria. They sound like Assad is the latest incarnation of the Crusaders."

=== 2006 Lebanon War ===
Two years after a 34-day military conflict in Lebanon and northern Israel, then Lebanese defense minister Elias Murr apparently gave a message to US diplomats, intended to be passed on to Israeli authorities, stating that the Lebanese authorities would not retaliate if Israeli military attacked Hezbollah in Lebanon.

Murr suggested that Israel would keep the support of Lebanese Christians if they do not attack Christian communities, and that they should not pass certain geographical boundaries to avoid legal retaliation from Hezbollah.

According to the cable, "Murr's opinion is that an Israeli action against Hizbollah would not be a war against Lebanon and that Syria and Iran did not ask Lebanon's permission to equip Hizballah with its rockets. As such, the LAF has been ordered to not get involved with any fighting ..."

Murr was especially concerned for members of the 1st and 8th Brigades in the Beka'a valley ... Murr is afraid that these two units could be dragged into the fight, the ultimate disaster that Murr hopes to avoid. As such, Murr is trying to ascertain how long an offensive would be required to clean out Hezbollah in the Beka'a. The LAF (Lebanese Armed Forces) will move to pre-position food, money, and water with these units so they can stay on their bases when Israel comes for Hezbollah--discreetly.

The message had been discussed with the president of Lebanon, Michel Suleiman, who at the time was also the commander of the Lebanese Armed Forces, with Murr stating that "he promised Suleiman the political cover for LAF inaction."

A cable from 17 July 2006, quotes Nabih Berri suggesting that he supported limited strikes against Hezbollah in a meeting with Jeffrey D. Feltman. The cable says that Berri described the military assault on Hezbollah by Israel as, "It's like honey. A little bit is good, but if you eat the whole jar you get sick." Berri's press office denounced reported cable leaks and described them as part of a "conspiracy".

=== Nabih Berri and Amal ===
Nabih Berri and the Amal movement, the party he heads, were mentioned in several of the leaked cables. The cables say that Amal still has significant support among Shi'a in Lebanon, but that the movement is rife with corruption, a situation summarized in one cable as, "Amal is near universally derided as corrupt to the core, but it is also considered the only alternative for moderate, secular Shia." Some of the specific allegations are that Berri was described by a relative of Musa al-Sadr as having provided social services in the south only through "wheeling, dealing, and stealing", and that Berri receives US$400,000 a month from Iran, using a fourth of the sum to shore up his support and pocketing the rest.

The cables also describe how the number of Amal members is declining as its supporters increasingly turn to Hezbollah. Thousands of young people and government workers are thought to have left Amal in favor of Hezbollah. One cable also covers the question of who will be Berri's successor. Berri was allegedly grooming his son to be the leader of Amal, and expelled other popular candidates who could have posed problems for him.

=== Emirati and Saudi involvement ===
The online Lebanese newspaper Naharnet focused on Saudi Arabian financial non-involvement and United Arab Emirates (UAE) military involvement in the 2009 Lebanese general election and US officials' opinions of these. According to an April 2009 cable, Saudi Arabia did not financially support the March 14 Alliance. US Secretary of State Hillary Clinton supported military involvement in the election, referring to "the need to support Lebanese Armed Forces (LAF) in the run up to the elections with concrete displays of support". Assistant Secretary of State for Near East Affairs Jeffrey Feltman stated that "the UAE had been particularly helpful already by funding the delivery of the first ten refurbished tanks for the LAF".

=== Saad Hariri's-Hezbollah animosity ===
According to Al Akhbar newspaper, Saad Hariri has vowed to crush Hezbollah once the Lebanese Army is consolidated. Druze leader MP Walid Jumblat, leader of the Progressive Socialist Party, expressed his concerns during a meeting with the US Charge d'Affairs, Michele Sisone, over reports indicating that Prime Minister Saad Hariri's Future Movement was training a Sunni militia composed of 15,000 men in Beirut and more than this number in the northern city of Tripoli to fight Hezbollah. Jumblat said that the establishment of private security companies by Hariri in Beirut and Tripoli indicated that "some persons", like Major General Ashraf Rifi, director general of the Internal Security Forces (ISF), were giving Hariri bad advice. It was also revealed that Wissam al-Hassan, the then head of the ISF's intelligence branch and very close to Hariri, said that Rifi was wrong in advising Hariri to establish a Sunni militia. Jumblat was also worried that Hariri's militia might cause heavy damage to the March 14 groups, especially since the Lebanese Forces led by Samir Geagea and Suleiman Frangieh's Marada Movement were training their supporters at the same time. Frangieh is an arch enemy of Geagea and a key member of the Syrian-backed and Hezbollah-led March 8 alliance.

=== Lebanese Army's Incompetence ===
Nimrod Barkan, an Israeli official, during a meeting with US Deputy Assistant Secretary of State for Near Eastern Affairs Jeffrey Feltman in Israel said that "The March 14 camp is brave, but it has been castrated." Feltman focused on the need to support the Lebanese army against Hezbollah, to which Barkan lashed out at Feltman stating that it would be useless "because the LAF would never directly confront Hezbollah and it could eventually fall under its control". Barkan called for a US-Saudi funded Sunni militia to be organized, Feltman considered that the idea was worth exploring.

=== Iranian takeover of Lebanon ===
According to a cable published in the Israeli Haaretz quotes the Lebanese Telecommunications Minister, Marwan Hamadeh saying that 'Iran Telecom is taking over the country!' Hamadeh was referring to 'the complete fiber optic system that Hezbollah had established throughout Lebanon' which he claimed receives funding from Iran and signals 'a strategic victory for Iran, since it creates an important Iranian outpost in Lebanon, bypassing Syria.' 'The value for Hezbollah is the final step in creating a nation state. Hezbollah now has an army and weapons; a television station; an education system; hospitals; social services; a financial system; and a telecommunications system'.

=== 'Hezbollah is like a tumour' ===
According to the Arabic-language Al-Jumhuriya, Lebanon's prime minister-designate Najib Mikati describes Hezbollah, as a "tumour". He further said it was a "tumor that must be removed", Mikati, argued "Lebanon could not survive with a Hezbollah mini-state". Regardless of his personal views on the group, Mikati said he was expecting Hezbollah to bring Lebanon to a 'sad ending". He assessed that Hezbollah was just like a tumour that, whether benign or malignant, must be removed.

=== Iranian and Syrian conspiracy ===
Israeli Mossad Chief Meir Dagan urged caution with respect to Lebanon, noted that "it is necessary is finding the right way to support PM Siniora. He is a courageous man, Syria, Iran and Hezbollah are working hard against him". Dagan noted that "Hariri, Jumblat and others had their parents executed by the Syrians". This anti-Syrian sentiment has forged an alliance based on personal and national interests. Fouad Siniora has worked well with the situation, but Dagan suggested that the odds are against him.

== Libya ==
=== Uranium shipment ===
A Libyan shipment of enriched uranium to Russia, brokered by the US, was nearly the cause of an environmental disaster in Tripoli in 2009.

=== Petro-Canada ===
Libya's state oil company called in a senior Petro-Canada official with a threat to nationalize his firm's operations in Libya if the Canadian government refused to apologize to the Libyan government. This was in response to Foreign Affairs Minister Lawrence Cannon earlier promising a tongue-lashing to Libya for the hero's welcome that it extended to a man convicted in the 1988 Lockerbie bombing. While the Libyan government did not follow through on its threat, it did issue an order on 30 September 2009 for Petro-Canada to cut production by 50 per cent.

== Morocco ==
=== Corruption ===
A cable from the US embassy in Rabat to Washington, D.C. referred to allegations of deeply established corruption, claiming that corruption was prevalent at all levels of Moroccan society and the military was also plagued by it, particularly at the highest levels. This may partly reflect a grand bargain struck by King Hassan II following at least two nearly successful coups in the 1970s, his offer to those who plotted against him was essentially "remain loyal, and you can profit". A former US ambassador to Morocco is quoted as "lamenting" about "the appalling greed of those close to King Mohammad VI".

==== State institutions ====
Leaked cables from the US consulate in Casablanca claim that the Moroccan Royal Family use state institutions to "coerce and solicit bribes in the real estate sector". It is reported that decisions for the ONA Group, a Moroccan financial company, are made only by Moroccan King Mohammed VI and two associates.

== Palestine ==
It was noted in one cable that Lashkar-e-Taiba purportedly raised funds in Pakistan for the Palestinian people in response to Israel's attacks on Gaza.

== Qatar ==
=== Al Jazeera ===
Qatar is using the Arabic television news channel Al Jazeera as a bargaining chip in negotiations with other countries. It is "one of Qatar's most valuable political and diplomatic tools."

=== Financial support for Islamic militants abroad ===
Hillary Clinton is alleged to have claimed that Qatar, along with Saudi Arabia, United Arab Emirates, and Kuwait continue to fund terror.

=== Diplomatic tendencies ===
Meir Dagan, the chief of Israel's spy agency Mossad, said that Qatar, poses "a real problem" as Emir Sheikh Hamad bin Khalifa al-Thani tries to please all parties in the Middle East, including Syria, Iran, and Hamas.

=== Qatar-US relations ===
The Qatari Prime Minister Hamad Bin Jassim Al Thani, repeatedly described the United States as a "friend" and called US-Qatari relations "strategic".

== Syria ==
=== Arms shipments to Hezbollah ===
It was alleged that Syria increased its arms shipments to Hezbollah despite its claims that new shipments had ceased.

=== Tabloid incident ===
A Syrian foreign minister was alleged to have fallen for a "tabloid-like story" regarding the death of Princess Diana. An American ambassador stated that this displayed the Syrian government's "'stark ignorance' of the outside world".

=== Assassination of Rafic Hariri ===
Omar Suleiman, chief of the Egyptian General Intelligence Directorate, stated that Syria "desperately" wants to halt the investigation about the assassination of Rafic Hariri, prime minister of Lebanon, on 14 February 2005. Syria is suspected of involvement in that assassination and in the 2005 killings of anti-Syrian figures in neighbouring Lebanon.

== Tunisia ==
=== Corruption ===
The Economist referred to corruption in Tunisia, stating that "cables from Tunisia bluntly depict the regime of president Zine el Abidine Ben Ali as a sclerotic police state increasingly tarnished by nepotism", referring to a 17 July 2009 cable. The cable stated, "Corruption in the inner circle is growing." Another from 23 June 2008 said "corruption in Tunisia is getting worse". The New York Times suggested the cables about corruption were one of the reasons behind the overthrow of president Ben Ali in the 2010–2011 Tunisian protests.

=== Political turmoil ===
According to Robert Godec, the US Ambassador to Tunisia, Zine el Abidine Ben Ali, President of Tunisia, and his government have "lost touch with the Tunisian people". Furthermore, they "tolerate no advice of criticism whether domestic or international". Godec also reports that "[even] average Tunisians are now keenly aware of [corruption in the inner circle], and the chorus of complaints is rising. Tunisians intensely dislike, even hate, First Lady Leila Trabelsi and her family".

=== Allegations of torture ===
The Canadian Ambassador to Tunisia, Bruno Picard, is reported in released documents to have insisted that Tunisia tortures prisoners who are suspected of terrorism and that he had first-hand evidence. The claim was made at a meeting about returning Tunisian prisoners to their home country from the Guantanamo Bay detention camp. Tunisia has insisted it does not practice torture, however Picard claimed this was "bullshit". Following the claims the US Embassy held a meeting with the Canadian, British, French, German and Italian ambassadors to suggest they avoid accepting any Tunisian former prisoners from Guantanamo.

=== Sakher al-Materi ===
The Economist stated, 'In a chatty account of a lavish dinner at the beachside villa of the Tunisian president's son-in-law, the American ambassador marvel[ed] at desserts flown in from Saint-Tropez, the multitude of servants, and a pet tiger that ate four chickens a day. The host may be interested to know that while bragging about his clout he struck his guest [the US ambassador] as "demanding, vain and difficult", with a limited knowledge of or interest in world affairs.'

== Yemen ==
=== Attacks on Al-Qaeda bases in Yemen ===
Ali Abdullah Saleh, then president of Yemen, said if the US attacks Al Qaida bases in Yemen, he would tell the people of Yemen that it was the Yemeni military that has carried out the attacks rather than the US. He asserted that "we'll continue saying the bombs are ours, not yours" in a meeting with General David Petraeus, head of US Central Command. Yemen's deputy prime minister for defense and security affairs, Rashad Mohammed Alimi, also joked about lying to Yemen's Parliament on US involvement in bombings.

Including all the leaked cables, Reuters considered these to be "among the most potentially damaging to US national security interests". They effectively confirmed the secretive US military intervention in Yemen to the public. Gregory D. Johnsen believed AQAP would immediately take advantage of the leaks as they supported the narrative of US-imposed war being waged in Yemen similar to Iraq or Afghanistan and the Saleh administration lying to the public and parliament. He said it "won't necessarily surprise a great many people within the elite circles in Yemen" but would likely have a greater impact on AQAP recruiting efforts in tribal communities. Islah MP Shoqi al-Qadha said confirmation of American involvement in the strikes would provoke public anger, but that lies to the parliament were "something we have gotten used to here."

=== Security of radioactive stockpiles ===
A January 2010 cable from Sana'a warned of concerns about the security of Yemen's main National Atomic Energy Commission (NAEC) storage facility, which "normally contains IAEA Category I and II amounts of iridium and cobalt-60". The cable stated, "The lone security guard standing watch at Yemen's main radioactive materials storage facility was removed from his post on December 30, 2009" and "The only closed-circuit television security camera monitoring the facility broke six months ago and was never fixed".
