= Raymond Audi =

Lebanese businessman and politician (1932–2022)

- Born: 6 October 1932; Sidon, Lebanon
- Died: 15 July 2022 (aged 89)
- Occupations: Businessman, banker, politician
- Children: 3, including Pierre

Raymond Wadih Audi (Arabic: ريمون عودة) (6 October 1932 – 15 July 2022) was a Lebanese banker, politician and businessman. He was the co-founder of Bank Audi.

== Career ==
Raymond Wadih Audi was born in Sidon, Lebanon. His father was a banker and his mother a painter, the family banking business go back to his great-grandfather who had founded a house exchange in Sidon in 1850. Raymond completed a two-year internship at Banque Misr Liban, then he moved to Kuwait. In cooperation with his family, he founded Bank Audi in Lebanon in 1962, followed by opening two branches in Europe in the 1970s. He was the director of the bank since its founding and the chairman since 1998. He was also the chairman of the bank's Corporate Governance and Remuneration Committee. He stepped down from his position as chairman in 2017 and was succeeded by Samir Hanna.

Audi served in the Lebanese government as Minister of the Displaced from 11 July 2008 to 9 November 2009.

He established the Audi Foundation, which is dedicated to the promotion and preservation of traditional craftsmanship in Lebanon.

== Awards ==
Audi was elected the president of the Association of Banks of Lebanon in 1993. He has received awards, among them, the Euromoney's Lifetime Achievement Award, and an honorary doctorate from the Lebanese American University.

== Death ==
He died on 15 July 2022, at the age of 89.

== Personal life ==
Audi was married and had two sons and a daughter. His eldest son, Pierre, was a theatre director and artistic director.

His brother, Paul Audi, is a writer and philosopher, who wrote several books in French.
