= Edmond Gaspard =

Lebanese lawyer and politician

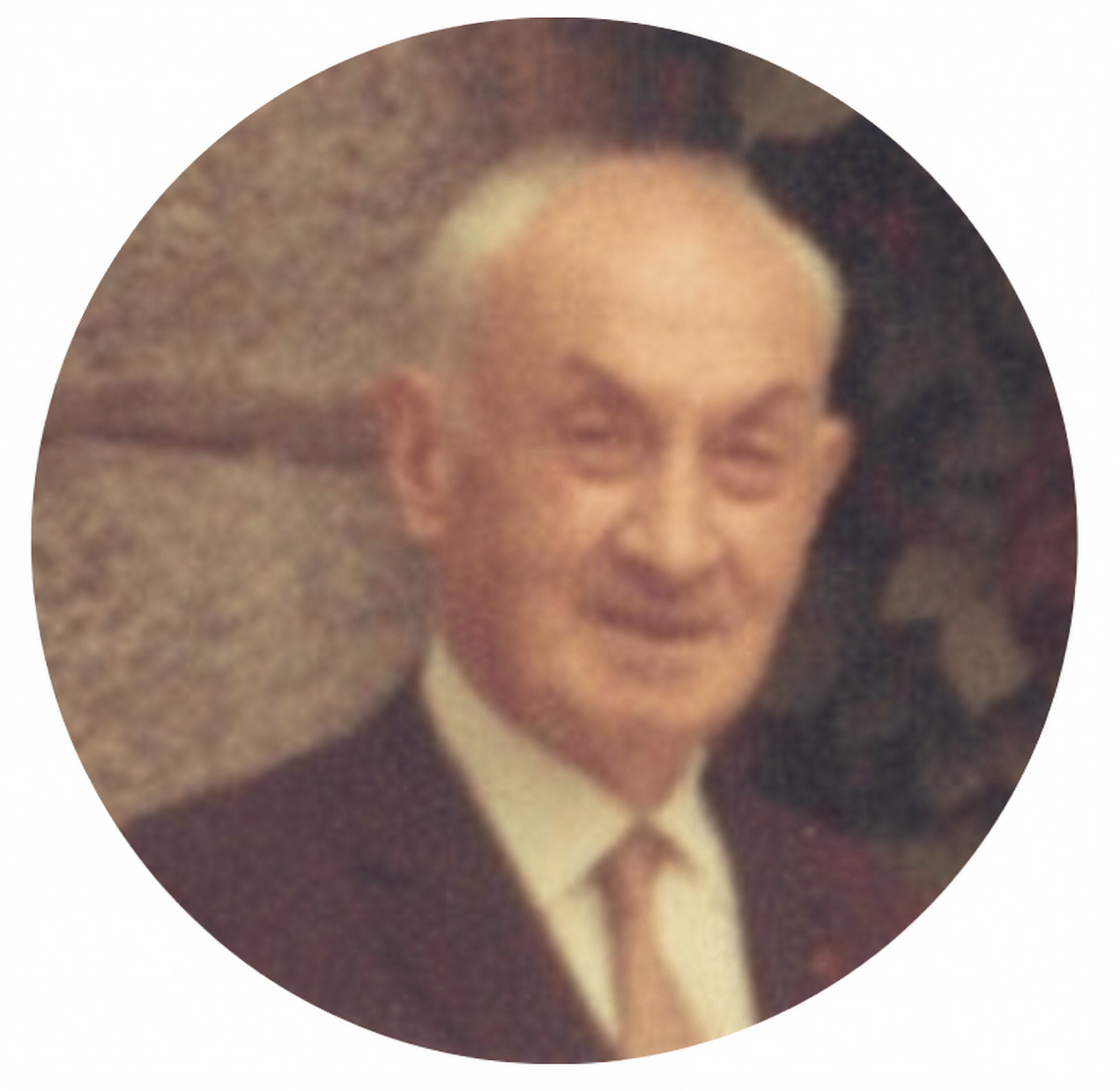

Minister of Education
- In office 25 September 1964 – 18 November 1964

Minister of Interior
- In office 14 May 1960 – 1 August 1960

Personal details
- Born: 1903
- Died: 5 May 1989 (aged 85–86)
- Children: Nadia Gaspard; Elie Gaspard; Asma Gaspard
- Parent: Elias Gaspard (father)
- Occupation: Lawyer and politician

Edmond Gaspard (1903 – 5 May 1989) was a Lebanese lawyer and politician who served as Minister of Education (25 September 1964 - 18 November 1964), and Minister of Interior. (14 May 1960 - 1 August 1960). He also served as Lebanon's president of barristers in 1944 and 1952.

== Early life ==
His father, Elias Gaspard, born in Batroun, was the president of the Batroun court and was exiled from Lebanon between the years of 1915 and 1918. In his first year of exile, Elias was prohibited from contacting his family. Edmond was only 12 when he witnessed his father’s exile, an experience that influenced his desire to become a lawyer and, later, a politician. Later in his life, Edmond Gaspard honored his father by naming a street in Hamra, Beirut, after him “Cheikh Elias Gaspard Street”.

== Personal life and education ==
Edmond Gaspard was born to a Maronite Catholic family. He attended Saint Joseph University in Beirut and earned a bachelor's degree from the faculty of Law in 1924. He was married to Laudi Abillama, with whom he had three children, Elie Edmond Gaspard, Nadia Edmond Gaspard, and Asma Edmond Gaspard.
