= Samir Mouqbel =

Lebanese politician

Samir Mokbel
- سمير مقبل
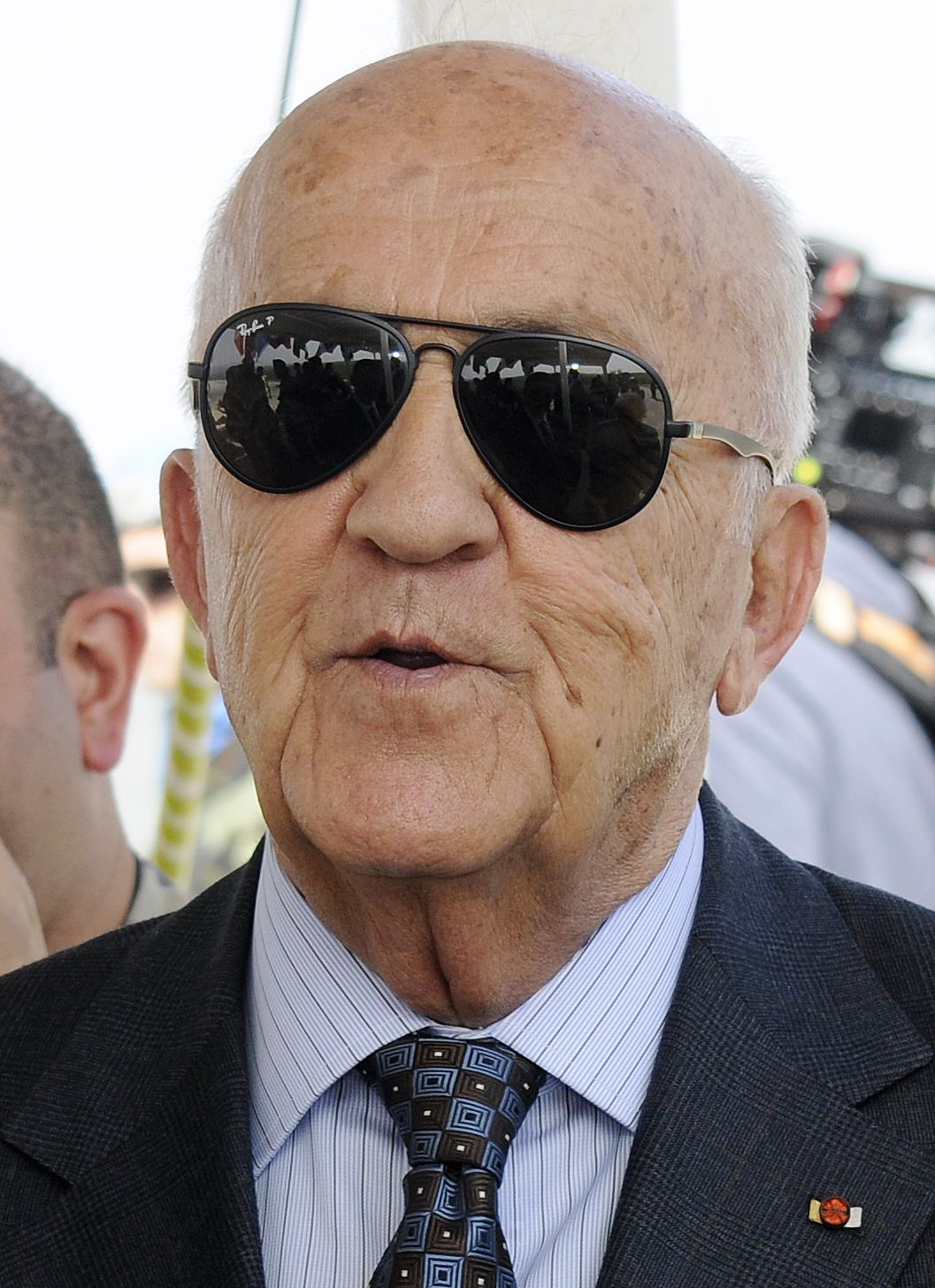
- Samir Mouqbel in April 2015

Deputy Prime Minister of Lebanon
- In office 13 June 2011 – 18 December 2016
- President: Michel Suleiman; Tammam Salam (Acting); Michel Aoun
- Prime Minister: Najib Mikati; Tammam Salam
- Preceded by: Elias Murr
- Succeeded by: Ghassan Hasbani

Minister of National Defence
- In office 15 February 2014 – 18 December 2016
- Prime Minister: Tammam Salam
- Preceded by: Fayez Ghosn
- Succeeded by: Yaacoub Sarraf

Personal details
- Born: 13 November 1939 (age 86)
- Party: Independent

Samir Mokbel (Arabic: سمير مقبل) (born 13 November 1939) is a Lebanese politician. He was the deputy prime minister and defense minister of Lebanon.

== Early life and education ==
Mouqbel was born in 1939. He graduated from the American University of Beirut with a degree in civil engineering.

== Career ==
Mouqbel is a Greek Orthodox Christian independent politician, and was Lebanon's first state minister responsible for environment from 1992 to 1995 in the first cabinet of Rafic Hariri. He was appointed deputy to the prime minister Najib Mikati on 13 June 2011. He was reappointed deputy prime minister in the cabinet led by Tammam Salam in February 2013. He was also appointed defense minister, replacing Fayez Ghosn in the post.
