= Alain Hakim =

Lebanese politician

- آلان حكيم
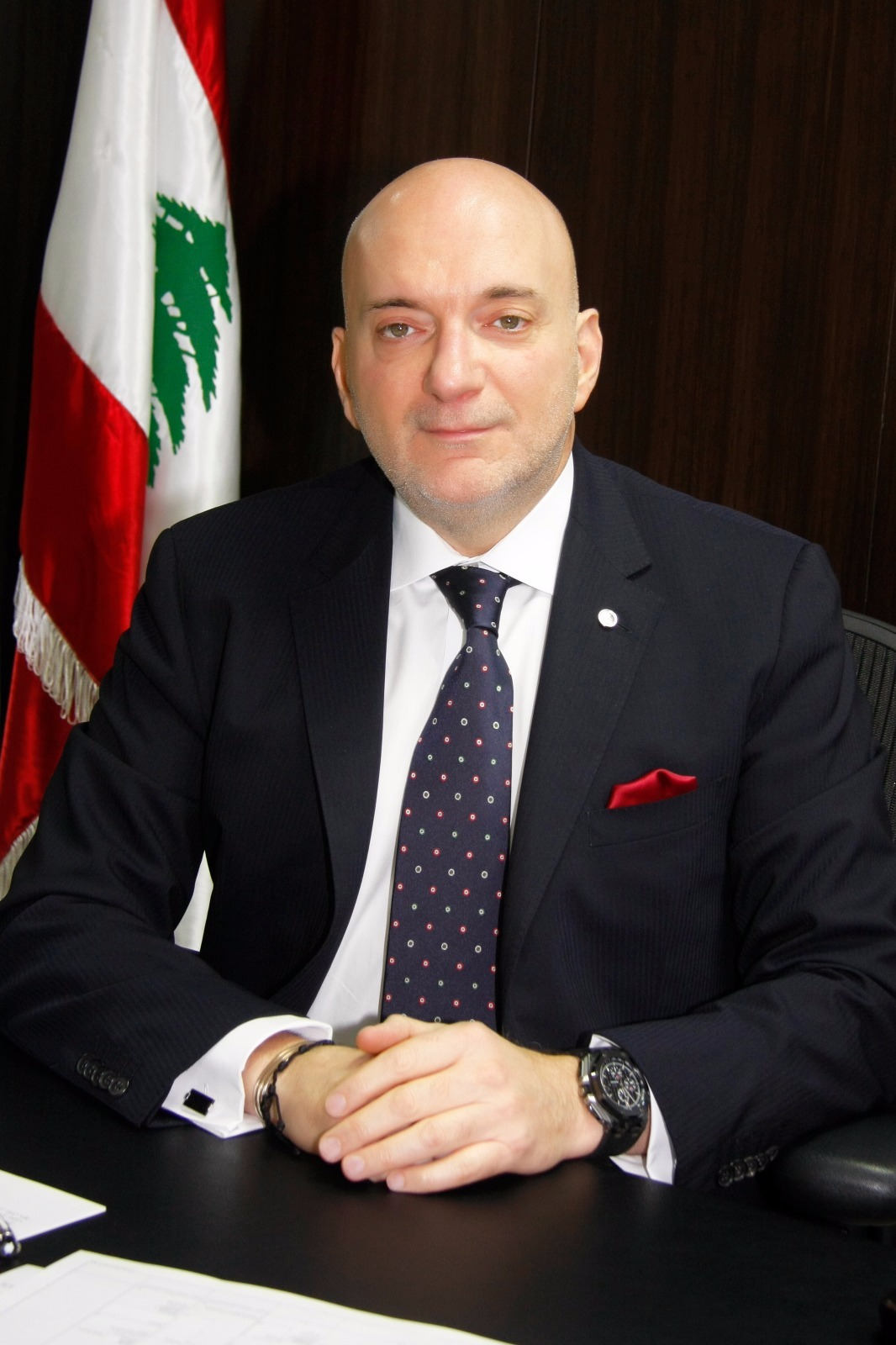
- Born: 3 May 1961 (age 65); Lebanon
- Occupations: Former Minister of Economy and Trade in Lebanon
- Political party: Kataeb party
- Spouse: Grace Accad
- Children: 2

Alain Hakim (3 May 1961; Arabic: آلان حكيم) is a Lebanese politician, previously serving as the Minister of Economy and Trade in Lebanon.

== Career ==
Hakim is a member of the Kataeb Political Bureau for four consecutive terms since 2014, former Head of the International Relations Bureau of the Kataeb Party where he also served as President of Business Council from 2011 until 2014.

Hakim's career in the business sector started in 1986. He is a Member of the Management Committee at Credit Libanais Group, where he also serves as CEO and board member in several affiliated companies within the same group.

Hakim is a professor at the Faculty of Management at Saint Joseph University (USJ), a visiting professor at Beirut Arab University (BAU) and was a lecturer at the Superior Institute of Banking Studies (ISEB). He is also a distinguished fellow at New Westminster College, Canada, since 2015. Over the years, Hakim has contributed significantly to the academic field, focusing on restructuring, reverse engineering, marketing, strategy, financial management, organizational behavior, organizational theories and AI in management.

Hakim started his studies at the Lebanese American University where he earned a Bachelor of Science in Business Management in 1986. He then he enrolled at Saint Joseph University in Beirut where he completed a master's degree in Business Management in 1990, a Master in Advanced Studies in Management (MAS) in 1995, and a Ph.D. in Business Management in 2013.

He served as Minister of Economy & Trade in Lebanon 2014–2015-2016 during which he was President of foreign Trade and Economical bilateral joint councils between Lebanon and Europe, Asia and GCC, Vice President of the European Union bilateral joint committee for trade and economy, World Trade Organization, interlocutor & initiator and World Bank Vice-governor in Lebanon.

In addition, Hakim is a Member of the executive committee of the Higher Council of the Greek Catholics in Lebanon. He is also Vice President of the board of directors of the Greek Community in Lebanon.

Hakim is married to Grace Accad and has two children.

Political offices
Preceded by Nicolas Nahas	Minister of Economy and Trade; 2014-2017	Succeeded by Raed Khoury
