= Alice Shabtini =

Lebanese lawyer and politician

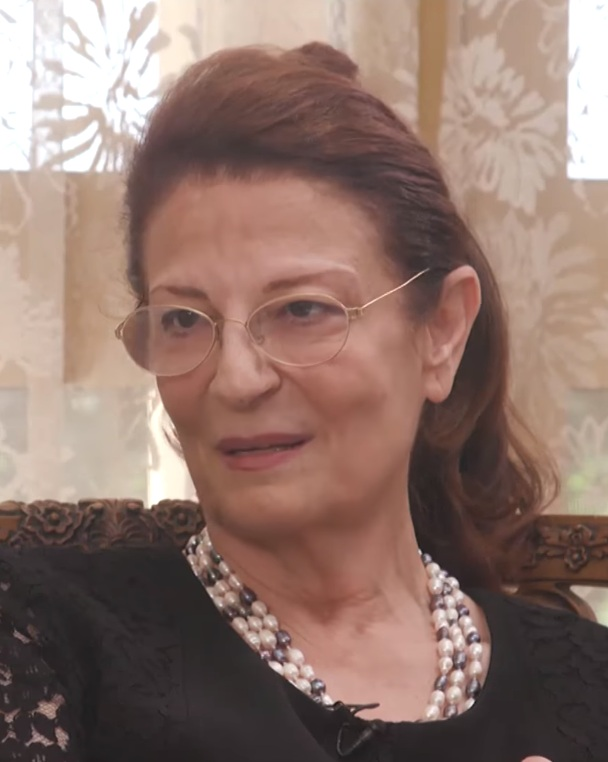
- Alice Shabtini talks to Al Aan TV, April 2018

Minister of Displaced Persons of Lebanon
- In office 15 February 2014 – 18 December 2016
- Prime Minister: Tammam Salam

Personal details
- Born: 1946 (age 79–80)
- Party: Independent
- Spouse: Dr Albert Alaam

Alice Shabtini or Chabtini (Arabic: أليس شبطيني; born 1946) is a Lebanese lawyer and politician, who served as Minister for Displaced Persons in the cabinet of Prime Minister Tammam Salam.

Shabtini, a Maronite Christian, was born in 1946 and holds degrees in international labour law and in political science. She has served as a judge, a professor of labour law, and as president of Lebanon's Court of Cassation and of its Military Court of Cassation. She was appointed to the Displaced Persons ministry by Lebanese President Michel Suleiman in February 2014.
