= Majd Movement =

Glory Movement حركة مجد
- Leader: Najib Mikati
- Founder: Najib Mikati
- Founded: 2004
- Headquarters: Tripoli
- Ideology: Secularism
- Political position: Centre
- Parliament of Lebanon: 0 / 128
- Cabinet of Lebanon: 0 / 30

The Glory Movement (Arabic: حركة مجد, romanized: Ḥarakat Majd) is a Lebanese political party. Najib Mikati has been the party leader since 2004. Mikati was a former Lebanese Prime Minister for the period of April to July 2005.

Mikati was the incumbent Prime Minister from June 2011 till March 2013; he was previously designated for the role on 25 January after his nominated by the March 8 Alliance. On 22 March 2013, Mikati submitted his resignation from office, which Lebanese president Michel Suleiman accepted on 23 March 2013. Tammam Salam was designated in his place as a consensus Prime Minister.
