= Hezbollah political activities =

Along with the Amal Movement, Hezbollah is one of the two main parties representing the Shia community, Lebanon's largest religious bloc. Amal has made a commitment to carrying out its activities through political means, but remains a partial fighting force aiding Hezbollah when the need arises.

Hezbollah has been a part of Lebanese governments since November 2005.

== Elected members ==
The Loyalty to the Resistance Bloc is the political wing of Hezbollah in the Lebanese parliament. Hezbollah through the bloc has participated in the Lebanese parliament since the 1992 Lebanese general election, when it won 12 of the 128 seats. Hezbollah won 7 seats at the 1996 election and 10 at the 2000 election.

The Bloc and Amal formed and dominate the March 8 Alliance. At the 2005 election, the Alliance won 27.3% of the seats, including all 23 seats in southern Lebanon. Hezbollah and Amal won 14 seats each. Both parties have been part of national unity governments since November 2005. Hezbollah has had two ministers in these governments and has endorsed a third, while Amal has had three ministers.

At the 2009 election, Hezbollah won 12 seats, while Amal won 13. At the 2018 election, Hezbollah won 13 seats while Amal won 16. The Bloc is currently led by Hezbollah member and prominent Shi'a politician Mohammad Raad.

At the 1998 municipal elections, Hezbollah won control of about 15% of contested municipalities. In 2004, Hezbollah won control of 21% of municipalities.

Election year	# of overall votes	% of overall vote	# of overall seats won (Note: Table also includes MPs of Berri's bloc/alliance and are not directly affiliated with the party.)	+/–	Leader
1992			8 / 128	Steady	Hassan Nasrallah
1996		6.25%	7 / 128	▼1	Hassan Nasrallah
2000		7.81%	10 / 128	▲3	Hassan Nasrallah
2005		10.93%	14 / 128	▲4	Hassan Nasrallah
2009			12 / 128	▼2	Hassan Nasrallah
2018	289,174	16.44%	12 / 128	Steady	Hassan Nasrallah
2022	359,577	19.89%	15 / 128	▲3	Hassan Nasrallah

== Hezbollah role in government ==
=== 2005 Siniora Government ===
Fouad Siniora formed a national unity government in July 2005, consisted of all the main political blocs in the Lebanese parliament, except for the Free Patriotic Movement (FPM)-led bloc headed by General Michel Aoun. For the first time, Hezbollah was represented in the cabinet, holding two of the 30 cabinet positions, and endorsing a third, Fawzi Salloukh: Muhammad Fneish and Trad Hamadeh. Although Hezbollah joined the 2005 government, reportedly in exchange for assurances regarding its military apparatus, it has remained staunchly opposed to the March 14 coalition's hegemonic ambitions.

On the other hand, FPM and Hezbollah have allied to resist the 14 March coalition's bid for hegemony. In February 2006, after weeks of committee-level negotiations, Michel Aoun and Hassan Nasrallah signed a memorandum of understanding that called for a broad range of reforms, from guaranteeing equal media access for candidates to allowing expatriate voting, that would level the slanted political playing field underlying the Hariri-Jumblatt coalition's grip on power. The FPM-Hezbollah memorandum met with virtually unanimous assent in the Shiite community and, according to a poll by the Beirut Center for Research and Information, 77% approval in the Christian community. The memorandum called for a reform of electoral law including proportional representation.

Fneish, Energy and Water Minister in the cabinet, was quoted as saying "We are a political force that took part in the polls under the banner of defending the resistance and protecting Lebanon and got among the highest level of popular backing ... Hezbollah's resistance (against Israel) does not in any way contradict its political role. If joining the government and parliament is a national duty, then so is defending the country."

The five Shi’ite members of the cabinet resigned on 11 November 2006 because of Siniora's agreement to the UN draft plan for the formation of the Special Tribunal for Lebanon to investigate the assassination of Rafik Hariri, who was killed on 14 February 2005. The Special Tribunal, along with an independent investigation carried out by Lebanese brigadier general Wissam Al-Hassan, found compelling evidence for the responsibility of Hezbollah in the assassination.

=== Anti-government protest and sit-in ===
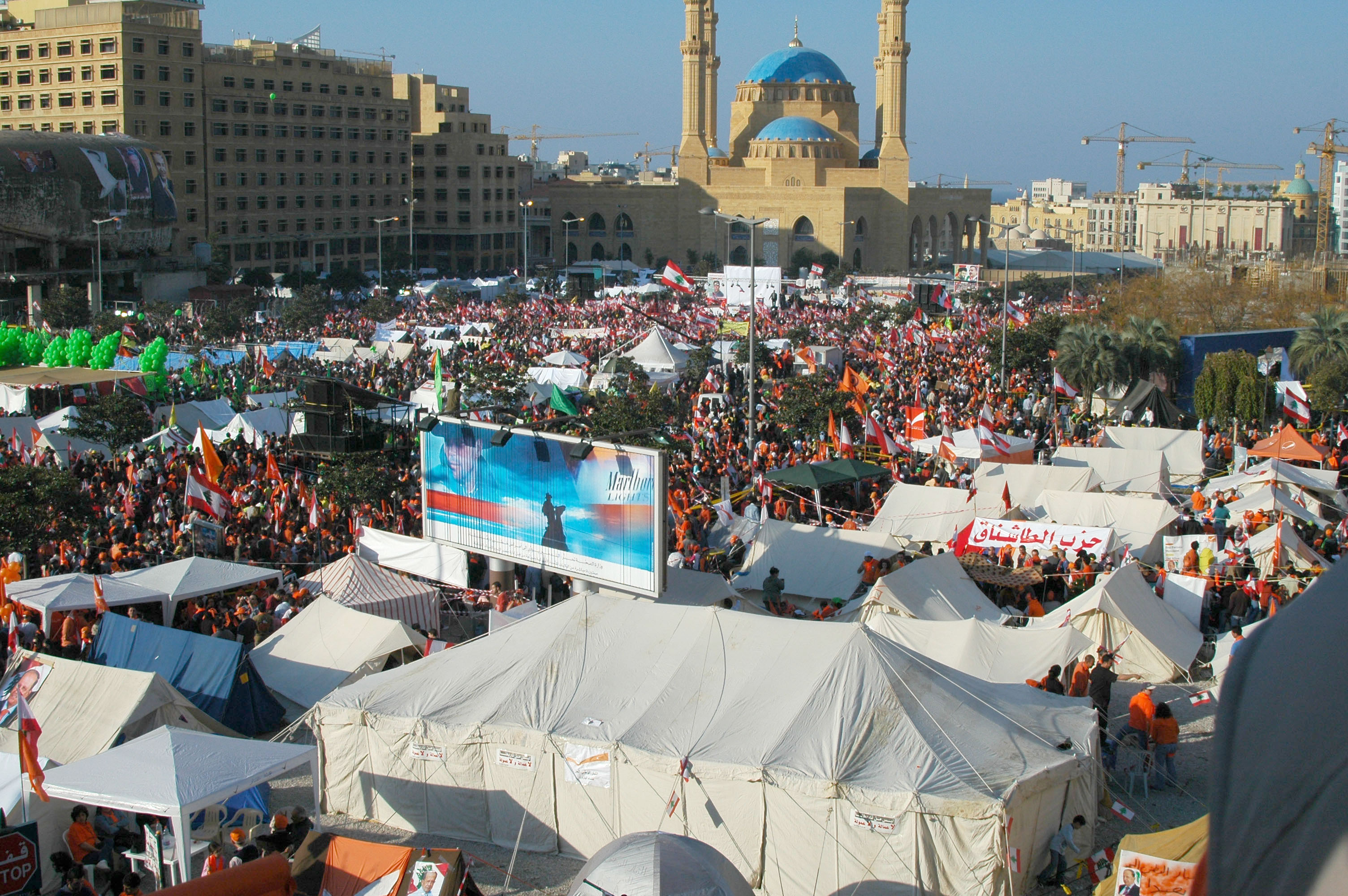
The Dec. 10, 2006 pro-Hezbollah rally in Beirut

On 1 December 2006, hundreds of thousands of demonstrators amassed peacefully in downtown Beirut, a day after Hassan Nasrallah in a televised address had called on people from "different regions, thoughts, beliefs, religions, ideologies and different traditions" to take part "for the formation of a National Unity government", because they "want to preserve Lebanon's independence and its sovereignty, prevent Lebanon from falling under any foreign tutelage, to strengthen the foundations of security, stability and civil peace, to cooperate in addressing the suffocating social and economic crisis, to address the political crises through true representation of all Lebanese movements and groups, to give real participation in the country's administration and to deal with various crises and face various existing challenges local, regional and international",

Police estimated the crowd to number approximately 800,000, while Hezbollah claimed it was larger. By nighttime, several thousand protestors remained to begin a sit-in, setting up tents and vowing to not leave until Prime Minister Fouad Siniora resigns.

=== 2008 Siniora Government ===
In the 2008 Government, again led by Siniora, another national unity government, Hezbollah and Amal each had two ministers in the 30-member cabinet. Muhammad Fneish was the Hezbollah minister, while Fawzi Salloukh was closely associated with Hezbollah.

=== 2011 Mikati Government ===
In the 2011 Government, led by Najib Mikati, a national unity government, Hezbollah and Amal each again had two ministers in the 30-member cabinet. The Hezbollah ministers were Hussein Hajj Hassan and Muhammad Fneish.

=== 2013 Salam Government ===
In the April 2013 Government, led by Tammam Salam, a national unity government, Hezbollah and Amal each again had two ministers in the 24-member cabinet. The Hezbollah ministers were Hussein Hajj Hassan and Muhammad Fneish.

=== 2016 Hariri Government ===
In the December 2016 Government, led by Saad Hariri, a national unity government, Hezbollah had two ministers in the 30-member cabinet and Amal had three. The Hezbollah ministers were Hussein Hajj Hassan and Muhammad Fneish.

=== 2019 Hariri Government ===
In the January 2019 Government, again led by Hariri, a national unity government, Hezbollah had two ministers in the 30-member cabinet and Amal had three. The Hezbollah ministers were Muhammad Fneish and Mahmoud Kmati. The government was forced to resign on the 29 October 2019 following mass protests

=== 2020 Diab Government ===
In the January 2020 Government, led by Hassan Diab, a national unity government, Amal and Hezbollah had two ministers each in the 20-member cabinet. Hamad Hasan and Imad Hoballah were the Hezbollah ministers. On 10 August 2020, the government resigned following public anger over the explosions that took place in Beirut six days earlier.

== Corruption ==
Hezbollah has sought to maintain an image of incorruptibility, yet in 2009, Salah Izz al-Din, a figure with close ties to the group, was implicated in a fraudulent pyramid scheme that defrauded Shiite investors out of approximately one billion dollars. The scandal, which involved affluent emigrants from southern Lebanon, was a major embarrassment for Hezbollah and sparked widespread anger and public debate about corruption within the organization.

Hezbollah also faced public backlash in June 2013 following accusations that its fighters looted property during clashes with supporters of Sheikh Ahmad al-Assir. Despite the group's efforts to portray its forces as disciplined and incorruptible, these incidents further eroded its public image. In response, religious leaders from Tripoli called for jihad against Hezbollah, further destabilizing Lebanon and undermining public order.

In areas like the Beqaa Valley, Hezbollah's control is contested by fiercely autonomous local tribes, as demonstrated by a 2013 incident in which a tribe kidnapped more than 40 individuals in retaliation for the capture of one of its members by Syrian forces.

== Position of Hezbollah militias ==
The Taif Agreement signed in October 1989 to end of the Lebanese civil war, besides other things, called for the disarmament of all national and non-national militias. Hezbollah was allowed to stay armed in its capacity as a "resistance force" rather than a militia, fighting Israel in the south, a privilege obtained – according to the Swedish academic Magnus Ranstorp – in part by using its leverage as holder of a number of Western hostages. UNSC Resolution 1559, adopted on 2 September 2004, besides other things, called on all Lebanese and non-Lebanese militias to disband. However, on 7 May 2005, Lebanese prime minister, Najib Mikati, declared: "Our terminology -- Hezbollah -- is not a militia. It's a resistance."

Hezbollah militias and Israel fought the 2006 Lebanon War, which began on 12 July 2006, precipitated by the 2006 Hezbollah cross-border raid. On 5 August 2006, Lebanese prime minister, Fouad Siniora, said that "the continued presence of Israeli occupation of Lebanese lands in the Shebaa Farms region is what contributes to the presence of Hezbollah weapons. The international community must help us in (getting) an Israeli withdrawal from Shebaa Farms so we can solve the problem of Hezbollah's arms".

On 11 August 2006, the United Nations Security Council unanimously approved United Nations Security Council Resolution 1701 (UNSCR 1701) in an effort to end the hostilities. The resolution was approved by both the Lebanese and Israeli governments and called for disarmament of Hezbollah, for withdrawal of the IDF from Lebanon, and for the deployment of the Lebanese Armed Forces in the south. The conflict ended on 14 August 2006.

In 2009, a Hezbollah commander, speaking on condition of anonymity, said, "[W]e have far more rockets and missiles [now] than we did in 2006." As at October 2019, Hezbollah has still not disarmed or disbanded its militias nor has the Lebanese army deployed to south Lebanon, on the border with Israel.

== See also ==
- Ideology of Hezbollah
- Hezbollah military activities
- Hezbollah foreign relations
- Loyalty to the Resistance Bloc
