= Tourist Landmark of the Resistance =

War museum near Mleeta, Lebanon

Coordinates: 33°28.119′N 35°33.378′E

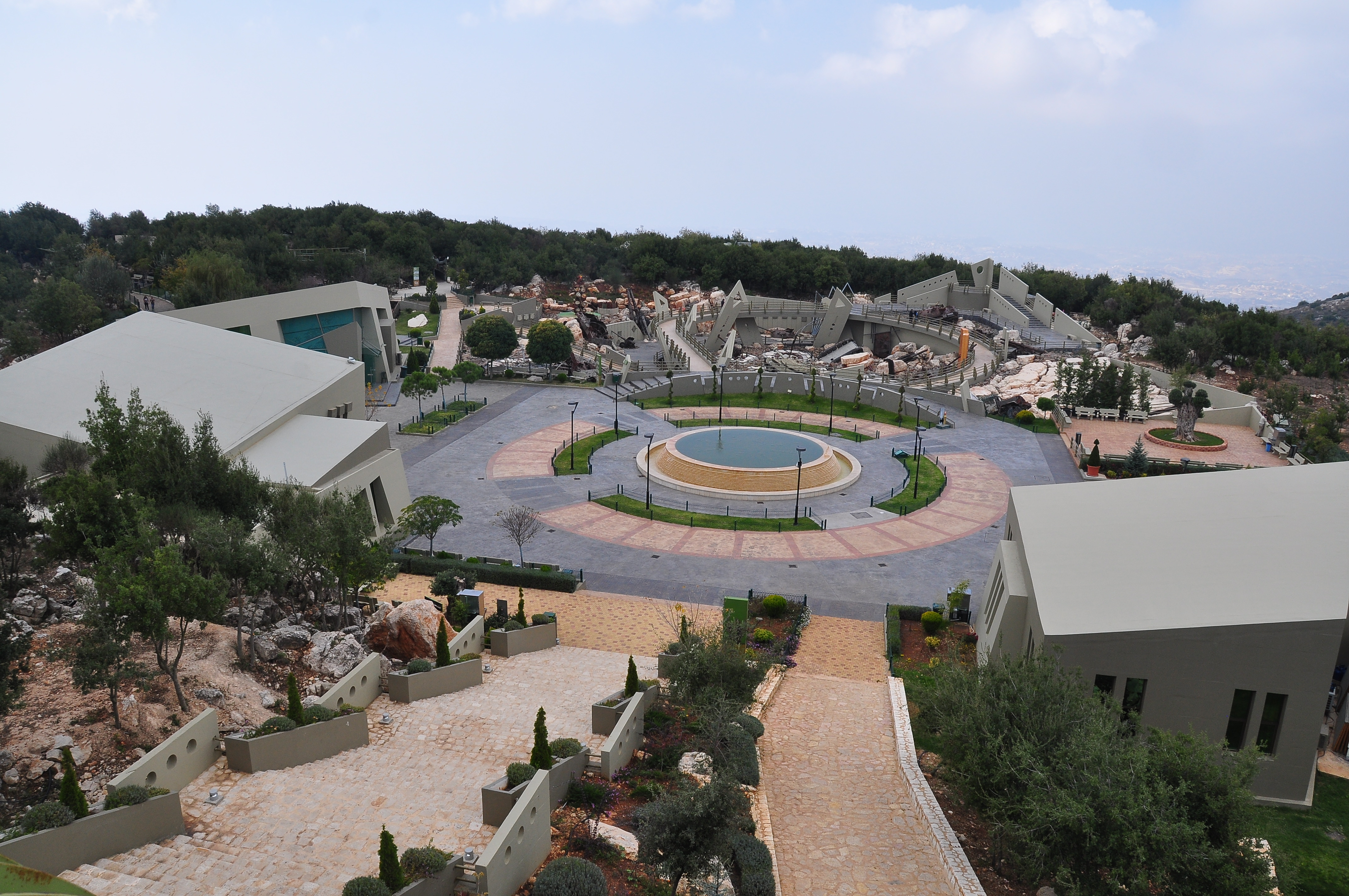
Mleeta Tourist Site, Lebanon

The Tourist Landmark of the Resistance, also known as Museum for Resistance Tourism or Mleeta Museum, is a war museum operated by Hezbollah near the village of Mleeta in southern Lebanon. The museum opened on May 25, 2010, marking the 10th anniversary of the Israeli withdrawal from southern Lebanon in 2000. The Museum describes the relationship between Hezbollah fighters and their relationship to the environment around them. The site was once an important base for launching various jihadi operations inside the occupied security zone. The Mleeta Museum is an interactive terrestrial museum that identifies the experience of the Islamic resistance in Lebanon and documents the history of Israeli occupation in Beirut, beginning in 1982.

== History ==
Opened in May 2010, the inauguration of the museum was attended by representatives of the president and prime minister of Lebanon, and Noam Chomsky. For Hezbollah and many of its supporters, the Israeli withdrawal in 2000 demonstrated the triumph of their resistance strategy. They wanted to create a monument that expressed their struggle and sacrifice in a physical museum. Hezbollah intended for the museum to preserve the memory of the resistance and educate future generations of Lebanese citizens. The cite of war was transformed into a site of remembrance and, for some, celebration. The creators aimed to showcase both Mleeta's military aspects, along with the spiritual and ideological movements.

The site was named after the mountain range that it is situated on. Hezbollah resistance fighters were stationed in Mleeta until the end of the Israeli occupation in 2000 when most parts of Lebanon were liberated. Alongside Mleeta, the cities of Jizzeen, Nabatiyeh, and Iqlim al-Tuffah were all the first lines of defense against the Israeli army.

Over 130,000 people visited the museum within its first ten days of being open. The museum cost millions of dollars and attracted 300,000 visitors in its first three months. This included visitors from Lebanon, neighboring Arab states, and all over the world. As of 2017, the museum had over 1.6 million visitors.

== The museum ==
A VOA report on the museum

Tours are led by guides who express the view of Hezbollah being the sole defenders of Lebanon against Israel, and mainly responsible for the Israeli withdrawal that came 18 years after Israel's second invasion of Lebanon in 1982. They also say that Hezbollah's involvement is defensive: "If the Israelis don't attack us, we won't attack them. We are not terrorists, we are very peaceful people and we have the right to live like any other nations."

In his welcome speech on video, Hezbollah leader Hassan Nasrallah tells visitors that "We hope this tourist jihadi center will be a first step toward preserving the history of our heroic resistance." Visitors are then shown a film about the Lebanese-Israeli conflict that ends with a speech by Nasrallah and a "sober pronouncement" by the assassinated Hezbollah leader Abbas al-Musawi that "Israel has fallen". They are then led past a large pit filled with Israeli helmets, tanks and shell casings. A sign reads, "This is a structural scenic art that symbolizes the defeat of Zionist entity."

Other park features include large portraits of Nasrallah and al-Musawi, and of Iranian leaders ayatollahs Ruhollah Khomeini and Ali Khamenei. There are wall panels with details of Israel's military machine, and a map showing places in Israel such as the Negev Nuclear Research Center near Dimona. Visitors can walk along a 100-meter-long sunken pathway cut into the rock leading to a lookout once used by Hezbollah fighters. Children can play at pretending to aim anti-aircraft guns by raising and lowering them, or clamber on overturned armored personnel carriers.

Among the attractions is a Hezbollah bunker and a tunnel 200 meters long. This was in use during the 2006 war. The bunker contains cots, kitchenware, electrical generators, and other equipment including an office equipped with telephones, radios and computers offering visitors a view into the life of Hezbollah fighters.

The park features a garden decorated with guns and missiles, called Martyrs Hill, and stone steps climb up to an esplanade dedicated to the organization's martyrs who have died as shahid fighting against Israel. Half a million people are estimated to have visited the theme park in the first 10 weeks after it opened.

Mleeta introduces the concept of land, nature, and environmentalism into the party's notions of thaqafa, or culture in Arabic. In Mona Harb and Lara Deeb's translation of "hala islamiyya", the authors reveal the importance of landscape production and environmentalism in representing Islamic milieu.

Mleeta is considered symbolic because it represents the years of planning within the LAA and marks the beginning of the effort to establish cultural sites that narrate the particular history, memory, and legacy of Hizballah's resistance.

== Landscape ==
The Tourist Landmark of Resistance is named after the mountain located in the highlands of Iqlim al-Tuffah ("region of apples"), a region in south Lebanon east of Sayda.

As Harb and Deeb write, "In Mleeta, the tree, rock, flower, bird, sky, cloud, and mountain are each symbol of Hizballah’s resistance which is equated with history, which is associated with nature, this land, which forms our culture, and these correspondences are made to be incontestably right, or righteous. "

Mleeta Site is located in A'mel Mountain (جبل عامل) in South Lebanon, surrounded by the villages of Habboush, Jarjou’, Mleekh, Al-Luwaiza, Jbaa’, and Ain Buswar. From its elevation, the Landmark of the Resistance overlooks part of the shoreline of the Mediterranean Sea and the villages of the Iqlim Al-Tuffah district.

The rugged landscape spreads over 600 000m^{2} and is dense with oak and birch trees, and contains many rock cavities and natural caves. Archaeological remains can be found in the mountainside, including ancient tombs and pottery.

== Museum Sections ==
According to the Mleeta Museum website, the Tourist Landmark of the Resistance has 18 Sections.

The layout is a large cross with a central square containing a circular reflection pool. The other exhibitions branch off from The Square, including a walking path and place for prayer.

The Mleeta Museum sits on the hilltop, and visitors can enter through the main site entrance, which consists of the ticket booth and concrete arc. There are a number of brochures that can be collected in English, Arabic, or Farsi. There is an additional souvenir and gift shop for visitors wanting to collect from the museum.

An ancient Oaktree stands in the outdoor space of the museum and embodies the "steadfast resistance of nature." This oak tree could not be uprooted when the bulldozers attempted to begin building the landmark and still remains as a part of the site. The tree symbolizes the spiritual and physical connection of the resistance to nature and is expressed in Mleeta's slogan, "Where the Land Speaks to the Heavens."

A multipurpose hall includes short films that display Mleeta's central narrative. Hassan Nasrallah, the secretary general of Hezbollah addresses the visitors on a screen before clips of the Israeli-Lebanese wars are displayed. The 1982 invasion of Lebanon plays on the screens, before the screens show the November 1982 suicide bombings in Sur and early Hezbollah leaders speak words of angry defiance. The clip also shows Nasrallah's famous "eye for an eye" speech from 2008. The video ends with Abbas al Musawi, who was assassinated in 1992 by Israeli, stating Isra'eel saqatat, or "Israel has fallen."

The Exhibition showcases Israeli military equipment won over by the resistance since the beginning of its conflict in 1982. The equipment includes field supplies, radios, hand grenades, helmets, medic kits, and various other military equipment that was taken from Israeli soldiers. There is a description about the structure of the Israeli army and its various military divisions around the haphazardly strewn equipment in the showcase.

The Abyss symbolizes the Zionist entity’s defeat. Designed to be viewed from above, it reveals a number of vehicles, armored vehicles, and weapons of the enemy’s army that were won over by the resistance after the July 2006 war. Centering the Abyss is a Merkava 4 Tank, which is half-buried in the ground with its cannon fastened signifying defeat. These "invincible" tanks are Hezbollah's biggest bounty from the war.

The Path is a rugged area under a protective canopy of trees where thousands of mujahidin were posted during the years of occupation. The used this base to launch hundreds of various jihadi operations against facing enemy outposts in and out of the occupied security zone. The Path illustrates scenes of various resistance attack situations on the walking trail.

There is an additional Prayer Corner/Place, which has space for 250 people to pray. The place includes a wall in the form of a mihrab, centered by a glass panel and engraved with the excerpts of Hassan Nasrallah's speeches from the 2006 war. Visitors are encouraged to spiritually connect with the collective in the natural place of war.

The Cave is 200 meters deep with several rooms and various equipment. More than 7000 resistance fighters took shelter inside, using the cave as a launching point for hundreds of jihadi operations against the enemy throughout the years of occupation. The heart of the mountain is meant to invoke a spiritual and physical communion of the earth, nature, and war.

The Liberation Field is an open space for gathering and resting and is surrounded by a number of the resistance weapons left by the Israeli forces.

The Well is a new area created at the summit of Mleeta in order to represent martyrdom while overlooking the former Israeli enemy outposts and other parts of the lands that were liberated in 2000.

== Public reception ==
The Tourist Landmark of Resistance Museum has been a source of controversy since its opening in 2010. It drawn criticism from Western media and has been dubbed "Disneyland for Jihadi fighters" and "Hezbollahland". Other critics like Lokman Slim, director of Hayya Bina, a pro-democracy organization, says the museum sanitizes war and is polarizing. News outlets like Fox News reacted to the opening of the museum by saying a confident Hezbollah was promoting "Jihadi Tourism" that touted Hezbollah's history.

== Plans ==
Hezbollah had plans in 2010 to expand the park's visitor facilities with swimming pools, spas, playgrounds, hotels and camping areas so that people "can come here and spend their vacations", stating that people in southern Lebanon have been deprived of such recreation for decades. There are plans for a cable car to connect the park and town of Mleeta with the nearby town of Sojod.

== See also ==
- Hezbollah Ideology
- Hezbollah foreign relations
- South Lebanon conflict (1982–2000)
