= 2011 Lebanese protests =

Uprising of Dignity

- Part of the Arab Spring
- Location of Lebanon
- Date: 12 January 2011 – 15 December 2011 (11 months and 3 days)
- Location: Lebanon
- Caused by: Confessionalism; Fall of the Hariri-led government; Assumption of the Mikati-led government; Observance of Nakba Day
- Goals: Political reform; Resignation of the Mikati-led government
- Methods: Demonstrations; Online campaign
- Status: Finished

The 2011 Lebanese protests, also known as the Uprising of Dignity were seen as influenced by the Arab Spring. The main protests focused on calls for political reform especially against confessionalism in Lebanon. The protests initiated in early 2011, and dimmed by the end of the year. In another aspect of the Arab Spring, Lebanese pro and anti-Assad factions descended into sectarian violence, which culminated in May–June 2012.

== Background ==
=== Political system ===
Lebanon is a parliamentary republic within the overall framework of confessionalism, a form of consociationalism in which the highest offices are proportionately reserved for representatives from certain religious communities. The constitution grants the people the right to change their government, however, from the mid-1970s until the parliamentary elections in 1992, a civil war precluded the exercise of political rights. According to the constitution, direct elections must be held for the parliament every 4 years. The last parliamentary election was in 2018. The parliament, in turn, elects a president every 6 years to a single term, he is, however, not eligible for re-election. The last presidential election was in 2016. The president and parliament choose the prime minister. Political parties are grouped with either the March 8 alliance or the March 14 alliance. (the Progressive Socialist Party of Walid Jumblatt is ostensibly independent but strongly leans towards March 14 even after their withdrawal from the March 14 alliance due to political views towards Syria and Iran).

Lebanon demographics is roughly split amongst Sunnis, Shias and Christians (most of whom are Maronite). Due to the demographic concerns, amid fears the country could be a powder keg, a census has not been carried out since 1932. Since then the government has only published rough estimates of the population.

=== 2011 new government ===
On 12 January 2011, the government collapsed after Energy Minister Gebran Bassil announced that all ten opposition ministers had resigned following months of warnings by Hezbollah that it would not remain inactive should there be indictments against the group by the Special Tribunal for Lebanon in the assassination of former Prime Minister Rafic Hariri. Preliminary indictments were issued 17 January as expected,) President Michel Suleiman's appointed Minister of State, Adnan Sayyed Hussein, resigned later bringing the total number of ministers who quit to 11 thus causing the fall of the government. The New York Times suggested that the resignations came after the collapse of talks between Syria and Saudi Arabia to ease tensions in Lebanon. The resignations stemmed from PM Hariri's refusal to call an emergency cabinet session over discussion for withdrawing cooperation with the STL.

Suleiman, who is constitutionally responsible for the formation of a new government, accepted the resignations. The March 8 alliance then nominate Najib Mikati to form a government in line with the accepted norms that a prime minister must be a Sunni (even though most Sunnis are supporters of March 14).

On 13 June, a new government was formed.

== Protests ==
=== 27 February ===
External videos
- Hundreds of Demonstrators Call for Revolution in Lebanon on YouTube

The protests began on 27 February 2011, with hundreds of Lebanese citizens marching along the old demarcation line in Beirut, symbolizing their opposition to the country’s sectarian political structure. While the protests were initially small, they reflected a deep-seated frustration with Lebanon’s confessional system and political stagnation. Demonstrators called for the creation of a secular state that would abolish sectarian quotas and promote equal citizenship regardless of religious affiliation. A peaceful sit-in in Saida also took place.

=== 6 March ===
By early March, the protests gained momentum. On 6 March, an estimated 8,000 protesters marched from Dora to Beirut, marking one of the largest anti-sectarian protests in Lebanon's history. The protesters marched from Dora, a district northeast of Beirut, to Martyrs' Square in central Beirut. Martyrs' Square is historically significant as the site of demonstrations during the 2005 Cedar Revolution, which had led to the withdrawal of Syrian troops from Lebanon. Demonstrators carried banners to "topple the sectarian regime" and the establishment of a secular state. Similar protests were held in other cities, including Baalbek and Sidon, demonstrating that the movement had widespread support across the country. At this stage, the protests were still largely peaceful, and there was hope among the demonstrators that their demands for political reform would be heard.

=== 13 March ===
A rally was organised by the in which several hundreds of thousands supporters attended in commemoration of the start Cedar Revolution 6 years earlier. The main slogan of the rally was calling for the disarmament of Hezbollah and to renew support for the ideals of the revolution.

The protests took a different turn on 13 March 2011, when the March 14 alliance held a large rally in Beirut to commemorate the sixth anniversary of the Cedar Revolution. Unlike the previous protests, which focused on ending sectarian rule, this rally was organized by the March 14 political coalition, which included parties like the Future Movement led by Saad Hariri. The coalition called for the disarmament of Hezbollah, which remained a heavily armed political and military force in Lebanon even after the 2006 war with Israel.

The rally attracted hundreds of thousands of supporters, making it one of the largest demonstrations in Lebanon in recent years. The main slogan of the rally was "No to arms, yes to sovereignty," reflecting the alliance's stance against Hezbollah's military influence. While the protest was distinct from the anti-sectarian demonstrations, it highlighted Lebanon’s broader political and sectarian tensions, as many Sunni and Christian groups opposed Hezbollah's role in Lebanon’s government.

=== 20 March ===
Thousands of Lebanese took to the streets to protest against the sectarian nature of the governing system. This was the third protest against the sectarian political system.

On 20 March 2011, the protests entered their third week, with thousands of demonstrators returning to the streets to voice their demands for political reform. The protesters, emboldened by the larger turnout earlier in the month, sought to maintain pressure on Lebanon’s political elite. The third protest saw demonstrators marching through the streets of Beirut, demanding an end to the confessional political system. Chants of "No to sectarianism, yes to citizenship" could be heard throughout the capital.

The 20 March protests were noteworthy because they occurred against the backdrop of escalating sectarian violence in Tripoli and other northern cities. Demonstrators faced increasing hostility from political elites, with some factions accusing the protesters of destabilizing the country. In Tripoli, clashes between supporters of Syrian President Bashar al-Assad and those opposing his regime began to escalate, leading to fears that Lebanon could once again be drawn into sectarian conflict.

=== 17 June ===
In interfactional clashes in Tripoli, Seven people were killed and 59 were wounded, on Friday, 17 June. Armed clashes erupted in following a rally in support of Syrian protesters. Fighting broke out between gunmen positioned in the rival neighborhoods of Jabal Mohsen (mainly Alawites who support the Syrian government) and Bab al-Tabbaneh (mainly Sunnis, supporting the Syrian uprising). Among the dead were a Lebanese army soldier and an official from the Alawite Arab Democratic Party.

=== 26 June ===
On 26 June, hundreds of people marched towards the parliament in Beirut demanding the end of Lebanon's confessional system.

=== 12 October ===
What the local press considered might be the largest general strike in its history had been called for this date. The General Labor Confederation is demanding higher wages, among other things. The cabinet acceded to these demands, and the marches were "suspended. However, the teachers' union refused to accept this, went on strike anyway, and paralyzed the nation's education system

=== 15 December ===
5,000 protesters filled the streets of Downtown Beirut as part of a teachers' strike, which is said to be a precursor of a general strike planned for the following week.

== Aftermath and spillover from Syria (2011-12) ==
On 5 and 6 October 2011, the Syrian army briefly invaded (killing one person) before retreating again across the border, causing instability in the Mikati government. "I am not being silent about this, we are dealing with the issue normally", Mikati said, noting the permeability of the border.

Further incursions by the Syrian military onto Lebanese territory occurred in December 2011, resulting in more deaths. More Syrian incursions into Lebanon (also to Turkey) followed in March 2012. In addition to the Tripoli clashes in March between Alawites and Sunnis, several border penetrations increased fears of Syrian uprising affecting Lebanon. The clashes greatly escalated in May and June, leaving dozens dead and hundreds wounded.

== See also ==
- List of modern conflicts in the Middle East
- Cedar Revolution
- 2006–08 Lebanese protests
- 2015 Lebanese protests
