= Trad Hamadeh =

Lebanese politician

Trad Hamadeh (born 1950 in Hermel) is a Shia Lebanese former politician and was one of Hezbollah's two representatives in the Lebanese government of July 2005 led by Prime Minister Fouad Siniora. The other Hezbollah representative was Muhammad Fneish.

== Career ==
Hamadeh worked as a journalist, political commentator, and university professor of philosophy. He was one of the Lebanese partisans of Palestinian Fatah movement from the early 1970s to the late 1980s. In 1984, he fled with his family to Paris. He stayed in Paris for ten years. He received a PhD. from Sorbonne University and also, worked there as a journalist.

Hamadeh was Minister of Labor in the 2005 government from April 2005 to 11 November 2006 when he and the other four Shi’ite ministers in the Siniora government resigned. He succeeded Assem Qanso as Minister of Labor, and was succeeded by Muhammad Fneish, another Hezbollah member.

Hamadeh withdrew his resignation in February 2008 at the request of the Speaker of the Parliament of Lebanon Nabih Berri. Hamadeh was not reappointed minister in the 2008 government in July.
