= Hussein Hajj Hassan =

Lebanese politician

- حسين الحاج حسن
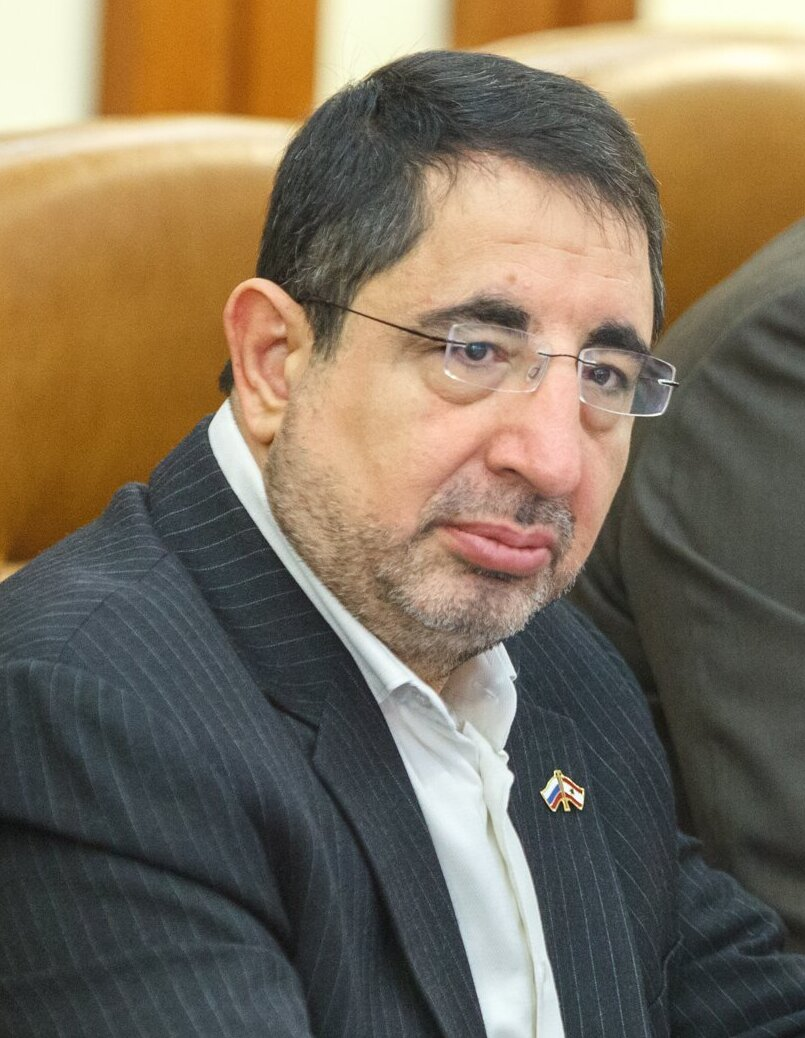
- Hussein Hajj Hassan, 2014

Minister of Industry
- In office 15 February 2014 – 31 January 2019
- Prime Minister: Tammam Salam; Saad Hariri
- Preceded by: Panos Manjian
- Succeeded by: Wael Abou Faour

Minister of Agriculture
- In office 9 November 2009 – 15 February 2014
- Prime Minister: Saad Hariri; Najib Mikati
- Preceded by: Elias Skaff
- Succeeded by: Akram Chehayeb

Personal details
- Born: June 23, 1960 (age 66) Al-Nabi Shayth, Lebanon
- Party: Hezbollah
- Education: University of Orléans

Hussein Hajj Hassan (Arabic: حسين الحاج حسن; born 1960) is a Lebanese politician from Hezbollah, founder of the Islamic Union of Lebanese Students in France and minister of industry. He was the head of Hezbollah's "Educational mobilization" unit. As agricultural ministry he signed a cooperative agreement Jihad al-Binaa to provide agricultural vocation. He is said to have focused his ministry's funds to Hezbollah constituencies. As of 2026, he is under US sanctions based on Executive Order 13224.

== Early life and education ==
Hajj Hassan was born into a Shia family in Nabi Chit in the Beqaa Valley in 1960. He holds a PhD in Chemistry and Natural Physics, which he received from the University of Orléans, France in 1987. He founded the Islamic Union of Lebanese Students in France. He worked as a professor in the science faculty of Lebanese University. He took part in the founding of the Hezbollah think tank: The Consultative Center for Documentation and Studies. He was the head of Hezbollah's "Educational mobilization" unit in 1991.

== Political career and views ==
Hajj Hassan is a member of the Lebanese Shia party Hezbollah. He ran on the latter's electoral list in Lebanon's 1996 general election and was elected MP of the Beqaa's Baalbeck/Hermel constituency. In May 1998, he argued that although Islamic state is an ideal solution, Hezbollah is aware of its inapplicability in Lebanon. In 2000 he was the head of the Lebanese Agriculture and Tourism committee.

He was reelected in the 2000, 2005 and 2009 polls. In 2009, he was among Hezbollah's 11 members of parliament. In June 2009, he met with the then European Union foreign policy chief Javier Solana in Beirut, representing Hezbollah. From 2000 to 2005 he led the parliamentary commission on agriculture and tourism. He is part of the "Loyalty to the Resistance", an opposition parliamentary bloc.

He was named on 9 November 2009 minister of agriculture in Saad Hariri's national unity government. In January 2011, he and other two ministers, Gebran Bassil and Mohamad Jawad Khalifeh, resigned from the cabinet, leading to the collapse of Hariri government.

He was appointed to Najib Mikati's cabinet again as a minister of agriculture in June 2011. As minister he signed a cooperative agreement with Jihad al-Binaa, in order to provide agricultural vocation. This move was criticized as allowing Hezbollah to take credit through Jihad al-Binaa of government provided projects.

As minister for agriculture, he allegedly funelled funds and government funds "selectively" to Hezbollah constituencies.

In 2018 he was reelected to Lebanese parliament as representative of the Bekaa III (Baalbek/Al-Hermel) constituency.

== Sanctions ==
In June 2026, it was reported that the US government has sanctioned him for his support of Hezbollah and actions within a terrorist group. His name was added to the US Treasury Department OFAC's Specially Designated Nationals (SDN) List.

== Life ==
Hajj has 4 children and is married to Hayat Salhab.

== See also ==
- Lebanese government of November 2009
- Members of the 2009-2013 Lebanese Parliament
