= Ideology of Hezbollah =

Ideology of Lebanese Islamist movement and militant group

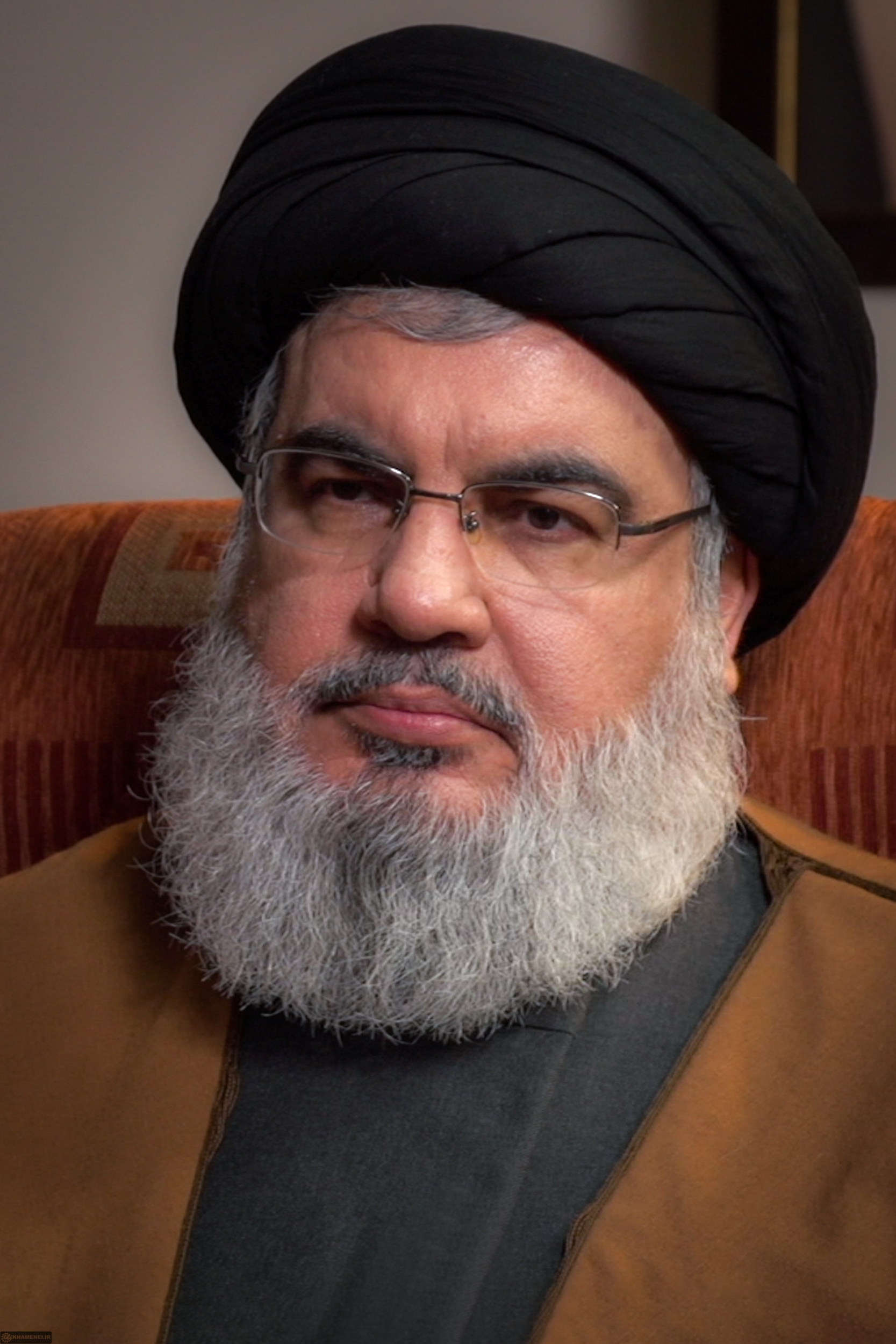
Hassan Nasrallah, former leader of Hezbollah

Hezbollah, a Shia Islamist political and militant group based in Lebanon, is driven by an ideology that combines religious, political, and social elements. Founded in the early 1980s, Hezbollah's ideology is deeply rooted in Shia Islam and influenced by the Iranian Revolution. Central to its ideology is opposition to Western influence and Israeli occupation, which it frames as a struggle for justice and liberation, while also positioning Islam as a comprehensive solution to social and political issues. Hezbollah's ideological framework is articulated through its foundational documents, such as the 1985 "Open Letter" and the 2009 "New Manifesto," which emphasize themes of anti-Zionism, anti-Americanism, and the establishment of an Islamic state governed by Sharia. The movement also advocates for pan-Islamism and pan-Arabism, promoting unity among Muslims and Arabs while supporting Iran as a model of sovereignty.

Despite its religious underpinnings, Hezbollah's ideology is marked by pragmatism, allowing it to adapt to changing political landscapes and integrate into Lebanon's political system. This adaptability is evident in its strategic alliances and its response to regional upheavals, such as the Syrian Civil War, where it prioritizes its material interests and regional influence over strict adherence to ideological dogma.

== Manifesto ==
Hezbollah declared its existence on 16 February 1985 in "The Hizballah Program". This document was read by spokesman Sheikh Ibrahim al-Amin at the al-Ouzai Mosque in west Beirut and simultaneously published in al-Safir as "The Hizballah Program, an open letter to all the Oppressed in Lebanon and the World", and a separate pamphlet that was first published in full in English in 1987.

According to "The Hizballah Program" the principles of its ideology are:

- To expel Americans, the French and their allies definitely from Lebanon, putting an end to any colonialist entity on our land.
- To submit the phalanges to a just power and bring them all to justice for the crimes they have perpetrated against Muslims and Christians.
- To permit all the sons of our people to determine their future and to choose in all the liberty the form of government their desire. We call upon all of them to pick the option of Islamic government which, alone, is capable of guaranteeing justice and liberty for all. Only an Islamic regime can stop any future tentative attempts of imperialistic infiltration onto our country.

It listed the Ayatollah Khomeini as the leader whose "orders we obey"; called on Christians to "open your hearts to our call" and "embrace Islam" and noted that "Allah has ... made it intolerable for Muslims to participate in ... a regime which is not predicated upon ... the Sharia"; explained that Israel is "the vanguard of the United States in our Islamic world".

More broadly, past leader Hassan Nasrallah described Hezbollah's ideology as having "two main axis: firstly, a belief in the rule by the just jurisconsult and adherence to Khomeini's leadership; and secondly, the continued need to struggle against the Israeli enemy". In late 1980s, Nasrallah said:

Our plan, to which we, as faithful believers, have no alternative, is to establish an Islamic state under the rule of Islam. Lebanon should not be an Islamic republic on its own, but rather, part of the Greater Islamic Republic, governed by the Master of Time [the Mahdi], and his rightful deputy, the Jurisprudent Ruler, Imam Khomeini.

—

In the early 1990s, Hezbollah underwent what a number of observers have called a process of "Lebanonization", which is reflected in acceptance of a multi-confessional Lebanon, rapprochement with a variety of non-Islamist forces, participation in electoral politics, and an emphasis on providing for the social welfare of its Shi'a Lebanese constituency. This tendency was expressed in religious as well as strategic terms:

Christians and Jews differ with Muslims concerning the interpretation of the unity of God and the personality of God. Despite that, the Qur'an commands: Turn to the principle of unity—the unity of God and the unity of mankind. We interpret this to mean that we can meet with Marxists on the common ground of standing up to the forces of international arrogance; we can meet nationalists, even secular nationalists, on the common ground of Arab causes, which are also Islamic causes. Islam recognizes the Other.... So Islam does not negate the Other; it invites the Other to dialogue.

== Khomeinism ==
Hezbollah's original 1985 manifesto reads:

We are the sons of the ummah (Muslim community) – the party of God (Hizb Allah) the vanguard of which was made victorious by God in Iran. There the vanguard succeeded to lay down the bases of a Muslim state which plays a central role in the world. We obey the orders of one leader, wise and just, that of our tutor and faqih (jurist) who fulfills all the necessary conditions: Ruhollah Musawi Khomeini.... We are an umma linked to the Muslims of the whole world by the solid doctrinal and religious connection of Islam, whose message God wanted to be fulfilled by the Seal of the Prophets, i.e., Muhammad. Our behavior is dictated to us by legal principles laid down by the light of an overall political conception defined by the leading jurist.... As for our culture, it is based on the Holy Koran, the Sunna and the legal rulings of the faqih who is our source of imitation.

Hezbollah was largely formed with the support of pro-Iran Khomeinists during the early 1980s whose intent was to spread the ideology of Iranian Revolution. It follows a distinct version of Twelver Shi'a political theory of Velayat-e-faqih developed by the Iranian cleric Khomeini. Although Hezbollah believes in one-person-one-vote system and disagree with the multi-confessional quotas under the Taif Agreement, it does not intend to force a one-person-one-vote system onto the country's Christians.

Hezbollah views its conflict with Israel and the Jewish people as religiously motivated. The history of the Arab-Israeli conflict to them is a repeat of the negative interactions between the Jews of medieval Arabia and Muhammad and the early ummah described in the Koran and other classical Islamic texts. God, according to Hezbollah's theology, cursed all Jews as blasphemers damned for all time and throughout history. Hezbollah, as well as the political-religious leaders of Iran, believe that the destruction of Israel will bring about the "reappearance of the Imam (the Shiite Islamic Messiah)".

These issues exist independently of Israeli treatment of Palestinians or even the existence of the State of Israel, although Hezbollah has strong objections to these more earthly matters as well. Hezbollah leader Hassan Nasrallah said in an interview:

Israel is an illegitimate entity and it is a threat to the region. It is a constant threat to the whole region. We cannot coexist with this threat. That is why the ultimate goal of the [Arab and Islamic] nation is to end Israel's existence irrespective of the problems, sensitivities and everything that has happened and could happen between Palestinians and non-Palestinians, Shia and Sunni, Muslims and Christians."

== Attitudes, statements, and actions concerning ==
=== Israel and Zionism ===
From the inception of Hezbollah to the present the elimination of the state of Israel has been a primary goal for Hezbollah. Hezbollah opposes the government and policies of the State of Israel, and Jewish civilians who arrived following 1948. Its 1985 manifesto reportedly states "our struggle will end only when this entity [Israel] is obliterated. We recognize no treaty with it, no ceasefire, and no peace agreements." Secretary-General Nasrallah has stated, "Israel is an illegal usurper entity, which is based on falsehood, massacres, and illusions," and considers that the elimination of Israel will bring peace in the Middle East: "There is no solution to the conflict in this region except with the disappearance of Israel."

In an interview with The Washington Post, Nasrallah said, "I am against any reconciliation with Israel. I do not even recognize the presence of a state that is called 'Israel.' I consider its presence both unjust and unlawful. That is why if Lebanon concludes a peace agreement with Israel and brings that accord to the Parliament our deputies will reject it; Hezbollah refuses any conciliation with Israel in principle.... When a peace agreement is concluded between the Lebanese government and Israel, we would surely disagree with the Lebanese government about that, but we would not make any turmoil out of it."

In 1993, during the Oslo peace process, Nasrallah and several other top Hezbollah generals came out staunchly opposed to any final peace agreement between the Israelis and Palestinians to the point that they accused Palestinian National Authority President Yasser Arafat of blasphemy and treachery to the Muslim people. Their strong objections to the Israeli-Palestinian peace process is held to this day. Jerusalem and the Dome of the Rock is used as a rallying point in Hezbollah literature, media, and music for the destruction of Israel and support for Palestine.

In a 1999 interview, Nasrallah outlined the group's three "minimal demand[s]: an [Israeli] withdrawal from South Lebanon and the Western Bqa' Valley, a withdrawal from the Golan, and the return of the Palestinian refugees". An additional objective is the freeing of prisoners held in Israeli jails, some of whom have been imprisoned for eighteen years.

Israel's occupation of the Shebaa Farms, along with the presence of Lebanese prisoners in Israeli jails, is often used as a pretext and stated as justification for Hezbollah's continued hostilities against Israel even after Israel's verified withdrawal from Lebanon in 2000. Hezbollah's spokesperson Hassan Ezzedin, however, said that

the Hezbollah campaign to rid Shebaa of Israeli troops is a pretext for something larger. 'If they go from Shebaa, we will not stop fighting them', he told [The New Yorker]. 'Our goal is to liberate the 1948 borders of Palestine,... The Jews who survive this war of liberation can go back to Germany or wherever they came from.' He added, however, that the Jews who lived in Palestine before 1948 will be 'allowed to live as a minority and they will be cared for by the Muslim majority.'

On 26 May 2000, after the Israeli withdrawal from South Lebanon, Hassan Nassrallah said: "I tell you: this 'Israel' that owns nuclear weapons and the strongest air force in this region is more fragile than a spiderweb." Arie W. Kruglanski, Moshe Ya'alon, Bruce Hoffman, Efraim Inbar, and YNET interpret the "spider web" theory as the notion, articulated by Hezbollah leader Hassan Nasrallah, that Israel's reverence for human life, the hedonistic nature of the Israeli society, and its self-indulgent Western values make it weak, soft, and vulnerable. Such a society, though technologically advanced, will crumble under continued war and bloodshed.

In 2002, according to the BBC, Hezbollah said publicly that it is ready to open a second front against Israel in support of the intifada." In a 2003 interview, Nasrallah has answered questions concerning the establishment of a Palestinian state established alongside an Israeli state stating "that he would not sabotage what is finally a 'Palestinian matter.' But until such a settlement is reached, he will, he said, continue to encourage Palestinian suicide bombers." In the same interview, Nasrallah stated that "at the end of the road no one can go to war on behalf of the Palestinians, even if that one is not in agreement with what the Palestinians agreed on," adding, "Of course, it would bother us that Jerusalem goes to Israel ... [but] let it happen. I would not say O.K. I would say nothing."

Similarly, in 2004, when asked whether he was prepared to live with a two-state settlement between Israel and Palestine, Nasrallah said he would not sabotage what is a Palestinian matter. He also said that outside of Lebanon, Hezbollah will act only in a defensive manner towards Israeli forces, and that Hezbollah's missiles were acquired to deter attacks on Lebanon.

In 2004, the Hezbollah-owned television station Al-Manar was banned in France on the grounds that it was inciting racial hatred. The court cited a 23 November 2004 broadcast in which a speaker accused Israel of deliberately disseminating AIDS in Arab nations.

Hezbollah's desire for Israeli prisoners to be that could be exchanged with Israel led to Hezbollah's abduction of Israeli soldiers, which triggered the 2006 Israel-Lebanon conflict.

In March 2009, in a speech marking the birthday of Muhammad, Nasrallah said, "As long as Hezbollah exists, it will never recognize Israel," rejecting a US precondition for dialogue. A prominent Hezbollah poster at a May 2009 rally had an image of a mushroom cloud along with the message, "O Zionists, if you want this type of war then so be it!"

=== United States ===
During the years prior to its official founding, Hezbollah was held responsible or partially responsible for several attacks on Western, mostly American, targets, and it has been blamed for killing many Americans. Hezbollah has denied involvement in the attacks, but its manifesto does claim that "the whole world knows that whoever wishes to oppose the US, that arrogant superpower, cannot indulge in marginal acts which may make deviate from its major objective. We combat abomination and we shall tear out its very roots, its primary roots, which are the US." Hezbollah supporters chant "Death to America" in demonstrations every year. This attitude mirrors the attitude of the Iranian government.

Hezbollah leader Fadlallah has told an interviewer,

We believe there is no difference between the United States and Israel; the latter is a mere extension of the former. The United States is ready to fight the whole world to defend Israel's existence and security. The two countries are working in complete harmony, and the United States is certainly not inclined to exert pressure on Israel.

On its Al-Manar Television network, which is viewed by "an estimated 10–15 million people a day across the world", the United States is portrayed by an animated image of "the Statue of Liberty as a ghoul, her gown dripping blood, a knife instead of a torch in her raised hand. In Arabic the video ... concludes with the words: 'America owes blood to all of humanity.'"

=== Jews and Judaism ===
Hezbollah has declared that it distinguishes between Zionism and Judaism and that it opposes Zionism.

- On 30 November 2009, while reading the party's new political manifesto, Hassan Nasrallah declared, "Our problem with [the Israelis] is not that they are Jews, but that they are occupiers who are raping our land and holy places."
- In a Pro-Palestinian Convention held in Beirut in 2005, Hezbollah representative in the Lebanese Parliament Abdallah Qussayr stated that "Hezbollah has never been against religions. Hezbollah supports all religions, it supports interfaith dialogue, and it has no problem with any religion. Hezbollah considers Zionism to be the enemy, not the Jews as a people or a religion."
- According to Joseph Alagha, Hezbollah "only regards the Jews living in Israel as Zionists, who should be killed". Alagha concluded that Hezbollah "neither discriminates against the Jews as a religion nor as a race" and that it is "not anti-Semitic in its overall orientation."
- Commenting on a recent project for rebuilding the Maghen Abraham Synagogue in Beirut, Hussein Rahhal, a spokesman for Hezbollah, said that the group supported the restoration of the synagogue: "We respect the Jewish religion just like we do Christianity. ... The Jews have always lived among us. We have an issue with Israel's occupation of land."
- Some Orthodox Jews from Neturei Karta have expressed their support for Hezbollah and their anti Zionist struggle.

However, the group has been accused of being antisemitic.

- Robert S. Wistrich devotes an entire chapter of his comprehensive, worldwide history of antisemitism, A Lethal Obsession, to Hezbollah and other like-minded antisemitic groups. In the book, Wistrich described Hezbollah's anti-Semitism as:

contempt normally reserved for weak and cowardly enemies. Like the Hamas propaganda for holy war, that of Hezbollah has relied on the endless vilification of Jews as 'enemies of mankind,' 'conspiratorial, obstinate, and conceited' adversaries full of 'satanic plans' to enslave the Arabs. It fuses traditional Islamic anti-Judaism with Western conspiracy myths, Third Worldist anti-Zionism, and Iranian Shiite contempt for Jews as 'ritually impure' and corrupt infidels.

- Jeffrey Goldberg, staff writer for The New Yorker, described the group as a "very, very radical, anti-Semitic organization." He stated that Hezbollah has embraced an ideology "melding of Arab nationalist-based anti-Zionism, anti-Jewish rhetoric from the Koran, and, most disturbingly, the antique anti-Semitic beliefs and conspiracy theories of European fascism." An article by Jeffrey Goldberg published in The New Yorker in 2002 quoted Ibrahim Mousawi, the director of English-language news at Al Manar, calling the Jews "a lesion on the forehead of history."
- The Hezbollah-owned and operated television station Al-Manar was criticized for airing "anti-Semitic propaganda" in the form of a television drama depicting a Jewish world domination conspiracy, and for making accusations that Jews deliberately spread AIDS. Hezbollah also used antisemitic educational materials designed for 5-year-old scouts.
- In 1996, Hezbollah called on Muslims to boycott the movie Independence Day, calling it "propaganda for the so-called genius of the Jews and their alleged concern for humanity." In the movie, a Jewish computer hacker played by Jeff Goldblum helps save the world from an alien invasion. Goldblum replied that "Hezbollah has missed the point: the film is not about American Jews saving the world; it's about teamwork among people of different religions and nationalities to defeat a common enemy." Hezbollah's anti-Jewish crusade, Goldblum added, "does not sit well with me."
- Amal Saad-Ghorayeb, a Lebanese writer and political analyst, devoted an entire chapter of her book Hizbu'llah: Politics and Religion to an analysis of Hezbollah's anti-Jewish beliefs. Saad-Ghorayeb argues that although Zionism has influenced Hezbollah's anti-Judaism, "it is not contingent upon it" because Hezbollah's hatred of Jews is more religiously motivated than politically motivated.
- According to Shaul Shai, Hassan Nasrallah has often made sharp anti-Semitic statements that not only revile Israel as a state, but also the entire Jewish people, while using themes taken from classic and Muslim anti-Semitism.

Anti-Semitic statements have also been attributed to prominent figures in Hezbollah and to Hassan Nasrallah.

- In a 1998 speech marking the Day of Ashura, and published in Hassan Nasrallah's official website at that time, Nasrallah referred to Israel as "the state of the grandsons of apes and pigs – the Zionist Jews" and condemned them as "the murderers of the prophets." MEMRI, CAMERA and Shaul Shai interpret this language as broadly antisemitic.
- According to the Israel Ministry of Foreign Affairs, Hassan Nasrallah, speaking at the Shi'ite Moslem "Ashura" flagellation ceremony on 9 April 2000, said:

The Jews invented the legend of the Nazi atrocities. ... Anyone who reads the Koran and the holy writings of the monotheistic religions sees what they did to the prophets, and what acts of madness and slaughter the Jews carried out throughout history. ... Anyone who reads these texts cannot think of co-existence with them, of peace with them, or about accepting their presence, not only in Palestine of 1948 but even in a small village in Palestine, because they are a cancer which is liable to spread again at any moment.

- According to Shaul Shai, Hassan Nasrallah said in a speech delivered in Beirut and aired on Al-Manar TV on 28 September 2001: "What do the Jews want? They want security and money. Throughout history the Jews have been Allah's most cowardly and avaricious creatures. If you look all over the world, you will find no one more miserly or greedy than they are."
- Badih Chayban in his 23 October 2002 article in The Daily Star, Nasrallah said that "if [Jews] all gather in Israel, it will save us the trouble of going after them worldwide." Charles Glass believes that the quotation was likely a fabrication, citing other published accounts of Nasrallah's speech that had no reference to the anti-Semitic comment, and statements by the editor-in-chief of the Lebanese newspaper which published the quotes that questioned both the translation and the "agenda of the translator." Glass also wrote that a Hezbollah spokeswoman, Wafa Hoteit, denied that Nasrallah made the statement.
- Saad-Ghorayeb quotes Hassan Nasrallah as saying, "If we searched the entire world for a person more cowardly, despicable, weak and feeble in psyche, mind, ideology and religion, we would not find anyone like the Jew. Notice, I do not say the Israeli."
- Saad-Ghorayeb quotes Hezbollah's Deputy-General Shaykh Na'im Qasim as saying, "The history of Jews has proven that, regardless of the Zionist proposal, they are a people who are evil in their ideas."

== Position on use of armed strength to achieve aims ==
Hezbollah's 1985 founding Manifesto reads:

whatever touches or strikes the Muslims in Afghanistan, Iraq, the Philippines and elsewhere reverberates throughout the whole Muslim umma of which we are an integral part.... No one can imagine the importance of our military potential as our military apparatus is not separate from our overall social fabric. Each of us is a fighting soldier. And when it becomes necessary to carry out the Holy War, each of us takes up his assignment in the fight in accordance with the injunctions of the Law, and that in the framework of the mission carried out under the tutelage of the Commanding Jurist."

Hezbollah regards any act of violence committed against any Israeli as "legitimate resistance."

== Women's rights ==
One member of the Hezbollah Political Council, speaking to an Online Journal correspondent in July 2006, claimed that "Hezbollah differs from many Islamic groups in our treatment of women. We believe women have the ability like men to participate in all parts of life." The Online Journal correspondent writes:

From its founding in the 1980s, Hezbollah women have headed education, medical and social service organizations. Most recently Hezbollah nominated several women to run in the Lebanese elections. It named Wafa Hoteit as a chief of Al-Nour Radio ... and promoted 37-year-old Rima Fakhry to its highest ruling body, the Hezbollah Political Council. Part of Fakhry's duties include interpreting Islamic feminism in Sharia law for the Committee for Political Analysis."

== Sectarianism ==
Hezbollah has denounced ISIS for seeking to ignite sectarian strife in Lebanon. Hezbollah's participation in the Syrian civil war, on the side of Bashar al-Assad's Alawite-dominated Ba'athist government, has intensified the group's sectarian tensions with Sunnis in Lebanon.

Hezbollah officials have asserted that their military activities in Lebanon and Syria are directed against those they describe as "takfiris", a term often deployed by Hezbollah officials against their Sunni Islamist opponents as well as against Sunni Muslims in general. Many Sunnis view Hezbollah's use of the term as part of the organization's sectarian rhetoric against the entire Sunni community. During the Syrian civil war, Hezbollah's propaganda has attempted to de-humanise the opponents of Assad regime by characterising the entirety of Syrian opposition as "takfiri". Such rhetoric has further strengthened the public perception of Hezbollah as a militant group waging a sectarian war against Sunnis in Syria.

== See also ==
- Hezbollah foreign relations
- Hezbollah-Iran relations
- Hezbollah military activities
- Hezbollah political activities
