= First cabinet of Fouad Siniora =

This is the list of the Lebanese government that was formed by Fouad Siniora on 19 July 2005 after the general elections of 2005, who was appointed by then president Émile Lahoud. All the main political blocs were included in it except for the Free Patriotic Movement-led bloc headed by General Michel Aoun. Hezbollah were firstly represented in this cabinet.

The legality of the government was questioned when five Shia members left in November 2006. The reason for their resignation was Siniora's eagerness to sign the UN draft plan for the foundation of the Special Tribunal for Lebanon, which would search the assassination of Rafik Hariri, who was killed on 14 February 2005.

On 24 November 2007, the government became an interim one following the end of the president's mandate. A new government shall be formed following the election of a new president.

== Composition ==
Lebanese government of July 2005
Portfolio	Minister	Political affiliation	Religious Sect
President Emile Lahoud's Share (3/24)
Deputy Prime Minister and Defence	Elias Murr	Independent	Greek Orthodox
Minister of Environment	Yacoub Sarraf	Independent	Greek Orthodox
Minister of Justice	Charles Rizk	Independent	Maronite
March 14 Alliance (16/24)
Prime Minister	Fouad Siniora	Future Movement	Sunni
Minister of Youth and Sports	Ahmad Fatfat	Future Movement	Sunni
Minister of Public Works	Mohammad Safadi	Future Movement	Sunni
Minister of Culture	Tarek Mitri	Future Movement	Greek Orthodox
Minister of Interior	Hassan Sabeh	Future Movement	Sunni
Minister of Education	Khaled Kabbani	Future Movement	Sunni
State Minister	Michel Pharaon	Future Movement	Greek Catholic
State Minister	Jean Ogassapian	Future Movement	Armenian Catholic
Minister of Economy and Trade	Sami Haddad	Future Movement	Protestant
Minister of Displaced	Nehmeh Tohme	Progressive Socialist Party	Greek Catholic
Minister of Information	Ghazi Aridi	Progressive Socialist Party	Druze
Minister of Telecommunications	Marwan Hamadeh	Progressive Socialist Party	Druze
Minister of Social Affairs	Nayla Moawad	Independence Movement	Maronite
Minister of Industry	Pierre Amine Gemayel	Kataeb Party	Maronite
Minister of Tourism	Joseph Sarkis	Lebanese Forces	Maronite
Minister of Finance	Jihad Azour	Independent	Maronite
March 8 Alliance (5/24)
Minister of Health	Mohammad Khalifeh	Amal Movement	Shia
Minister of Agriculture	Talah Sahili	Amal Movement	Shia
Minister of Labour	Trad Hamadeh	Hezbollah	Shia
Minister of Energy and Water	Muhammad Fneish	Hezbollah	Shia
Minister of Foreign Affairs	Fawzi Salloukh	Independent	Shia

== Notes ==
Preceded by Lebanese government of April 2005	List of Lebanese governments 2020–present	Succeeded by Lebanese government of July 2008
