= Hezbollah military activities =

Hezbollah has a military branch and is the sponsor of a number of lesser-known groups, some of which may be little more than fronts for Hezbollah itself. These groups include the Organization of the Oppressed, the Revolutionary Justice Organization, the Organization of Right Against Wrong, and Followers of the Prophet Muhammad.

United Nations Security Council Resolution 1559 called for the disarmament of militia with the Taif agreement at the end of the Lebanese Civil War. Hezbollah denounced, and protested against, the resolution. The 2006 military conflict with Israel has increased the controversy. Failure to disarm remains a violation of the resolution and agreement according to the Israeli Government.

Most Shias consider Hezbollah's paramilitary a necessary and justified element of resistance, while less than half of the other religious communities support the idea that Hezbollah should keep its weapons after the 2006 Lebanon War. The Lebanese cabinet, under president Michel Suleiman and Prime Minister Fouad Siniora, guidelines state that Hezbollah enjoys the right to "liberate occupied lands." In 2009, a Hezbollah commander, speaking on condition of anonymity, said, "[W]e have far more rockets and missiles [now] than we did in 2006."

== Introduction ==
The strength of Hezbollah's forces are disputed, and has been variously estimated as "several thousand" and "several thousand supporters and a few hundred terrorist operatives". In 2006, the International Institute for Strategic Studies estimated Hezbollah forces to 600–1,000 active fighters (with 3,000–5,000 available and 10,000 reservists), 10,000–15,000 rockets of the Katyusha, Fajr-3 and Fajr-5 type. They also estimated a stockpile of 30 missiles of the Zelzal type. More recent assessments of Hezbollah's armed strength indicate at least 20,000 fighters and up to 120,000 rockets.

As Haaretz reports Hezbollah is not a small guerrilla group. It is a trained, skilled, well-organized, highly motivated infantry that is equipped with the cream of the crop of modern weaponry from the arsenals of Syria, Iran, Russia, and China, and which is very familiar with the territory on which it is fighting. Hezbollah has also military relations with North Korea, which date back to the 1980s.

Hezbollah military is considered to be the most capable non-state armed group in the Middle East. According to Jane's Information Group:

Islamic Resistance guerrillas are reckoned to be amongst the most dedicated, motivated and highly trained of their kind. Any Hezbollah member receiving military training is likely to do so at the hands of IRGC [the Islamic Revolutionary Guard Corps], either in southern Lebanon or in camps in Iran. The increasingly sophisticated methods used by IRGC members indicates that they are trained using Israeli and US military manuals; the emphasis of this training is on the tactics of attrition, mobility, intelligence gathering and night-time manoeuvres.

Hezbollah's strength was enhanced by the dispatching of one thousand to fifteen hundred members of the Iranian Revolutionary Guards and the financial backing of Iran. It became the main politico-military force among the Shi'a community in Lebanon and the main arm of what became known later as the Islamic Resistance in Lebanon.

Hezbollah has a military branch known as Al-Muqawama al-Islamiyya ("The Islamic Resistance") and is the possible sponsor of a number of lesser-known militant groups, some of which may be little more than fronts for Hezbollah itself, including the Organization of the Oppressed, the Revolutionary Justice Organization, the Organization of Right Against Wrong, and Followers of the Prophet Muhammad.

United Nations Security Council Resolution 1559 called for the disarmament of militia with the Taif agreement at the end of the Lebanese Civil War. Hezbollah denounced, and protested against, the resolution. The 2006 war with Israel has increased the controversy. Failure to disarm remains a violation of the resolution and agreement according to the Israeli Government.

== History ==
=== Accusations of suicide attacks and kidnappings ===
Hezbollah has been accused of committing a number of attacks and kidnappings. Between 1982 and 1986, in the midst of the Lebanese Civil War, 36 suicide attacks were made in Lebanon against American, French, Lebanese, and Israeli targets by 41 people of different religions and political ideologies, killing 659 people. Hezbollah has been accused of some or all of these attacks, but responsibility is disputed, and Hezbollah has denied being involved in any of them.

These attacks included the April 1983 U.S. Embassy bombing, the attempted bombing of an Israeli airplane in Panama, the 1983 Beirut barracks bombing, and a spate of attacks on IDF troops and SLA militiamen in southern Lebanon. The period also saw the hijacking of TWA Flight 847 in 1985, and the Lebanon hostage crisis from 1982 to 1992.

Outside of Lebanon, Hezbollah has been accused of the 1992 Israeli Embassy attack in Buenos Aires, and the 1994 AMIA bombing of a Jewish cultural centre, both in Argentina. According to Hassan Nasrallah, Hezbollah refused any participation in operations outside Lebanese and Israeli lands before 2008.

Singapore accused Hezbollah of recruiting Singaporeans in a failed 1990s plot to attack U.S. and Israeli ships in the Singapore Straits.

=== Conflict with Israel ===
Hezbollah has been involved in several cases of armed conflict with Israel: During the South Lebanon conflict (1985-2000), Hezbollah waged a guerrilla war against Israeli forces occupying Southern Lebanon. It ended with Israeli withdrawal in accordance with 1978's United Nations Security Council Resolution 425. "With the collapse of their supposed allies, the SLA, and the rapid advance of Hezbollah forces, they withdrew suddenly on 24 May 2000 six weeks before the announced 7 July." Hezbollah held a victory parade, and its popularity in Lebanon rose.

On 25 July 1993, following the killing of seven Israeli soldiers in southern Lebanon, Israel launched Operation Accountability (known in Lebanon as the Seven Day War), during which the IDF carried out their heaviest artillery and air attacks on targets in southern Lebanon since the 1982 Lebanon War. The declared aim of the operation was to eradicate the threat posed by Hezbollah and to force the civilian population north to Beirut so as to put pressure on the Lebanese Government to repress Hezbollah. The fighting ended when an unwritten understanding was agreed to by the warring parties. Apparently, the 1993 understanding provided that Hezbollah combatants would not fire rockets at northern Israel, while Israel would not attack civilians or civilian targets in Lebanon.

In April 1996, the Israeli forces launched Operation Grapes of Wrath, which was intended to wipe out Hezbollah's base in southern Lebanon. Over 100 Lebanese refugees were killed by the shelling of a UN base at Qana, in what the Israeli military said was a mistake. Following several days of negotiations, the two sides signed the Grapes of Wrath Understandings on 26 April 1996. A cease-fire was agreed upon between Israel and Hezbollah, which would be effective on 27 April 1996. Both sides agreed that civilians should not be targeted, which meant that Hezbollah would be allowed to continue its military activities against IDF forces inside Lebanon.

On 7 October 2000, three Israeli soldiers – Adi Avitan, Staff Sgt. Benyamin Avraham, and Staff Sgt. Omar Sawaidwere – were abducted by Hezbollah while patrolling the Israeli side of the Blue Line. The soldiers were killed either during the attack or in its immediate aftermath. Defense Minister Shaul Mofaz has, however, claimed that Hezbollah abducted the soldiers and then killed them. The bodies of the slain soldiers were exchanged for Lebanese prisoners in 2004.

=== 2006 Lebanon War ===
Hezbollah's desire for Israeli prisoners that could be exchanged with Israel led to Hezbollah's abduction of Israeli soldiers, which triggered the 2006 Lebanon War.

The 2006 Lebanon War was a 34-day conflict in Lebanon and northern Israel. The principal parties were Hezbollah paramilitary forces and the Israeli military. The conflict started on 12 July 2006, and continued until a United Nations-brokered ceasefire went into effect on 14 August 2006. Hezbollah was responsible for thousands of Katyusha rocket attacks against Israeli civilian towns and cities in northern Israel, in retaliation for Israel's killing of civilians and targeting the Lebanese infrastructure.

The conflict began when Hezbollah militants fired rockets at Israeli border towns as a diversion for an anti-tank missile attack on two armored Humvees patrolling the Israeli side of the border fence, killing three, injuring two, and capturing two Israeli soldiers. According to The Guardian, "In the fighting 1,200 Lebanese and 158 Israelis were killed. Of the dead almost 1,000 Lebanese and 41 Israelis were civilians."

=== 2009 Egypt plot ===
Allegations of a plot to attack sites in Egypt in 2009 led to tension between the Egyptian government and Hezbollah.

=== Syrian Civil War ===
Hezbollah has long been an ally of the Ba'ath government of Syria, led by the al-Assad family. Hezbollah has helped the Syrian government in its fight against the Syrian rebels during the Syrian Civil War. In August 2012, the United States sanctioned Hezbollah "for its alleged role in the war". General Secretary Nasrallah denied Hezbollah had been fighting on behalf of the Syrian government, stating in a 12 October 2012 speech that "right from the start the Syrian opposition has been telling the media that Hizbullah sent 3,000 fighters to Syria, which we have denied". However, according to the Lebanese Daily Star newspaper, Nasrallah said in the same speech that Hezbollah fighters helped the Syrian government "retain control of some 23 strategically located villages [in Syria] inhabited by Shiites of Lebanese citizenship". Nasrallah said that Hezbollah fighters have died in Syria doing their "jihadist duties".

In 2012, Hezbollah fighters crossed the border from Lebanon and took over eight villages in the Al-Qusayr District of Syria. On 16–17 February 2013, Syrian opposition groups claimed that Hezbollah, backed by the Syrian military, attacked three neighboring Sunni villages controlled by the Free Syrian Army (FSA). An FSA spokesman said, "Hezbollah's invasion is the first of its kind in terms of organisation, planning and coordination with the Syrian regime's air force". Hezbollah said three Lebanese Shias, "acting in self-defense", were killed in the clashes with the FSA. Lebanese security sources said that the three were Hezbollah members.

In response, the FSA allegedly attacked two Hezbollah positions on 21 February; one in Syria and one in Lebanon. Five days later, it said it destroyed a convoy carrying Hezbollah fighters and Syrian officers to Lebanon, killing all the passengers. The leaders of the March 14 alliance and other prominent Lebanese figures called on Hezbollah to end its involvement in Syria and said it is putting Lebanon at risk.

Subhi al-Tufayli, Hezbollah's founder and former leader, said "Hezbollah should not be defending the criminal regime that kills its own people and that has never fired a shot in defense of the Palestinians". He said "those Hezbollah fighters who are killing children and terrorizing people and destroying houses in Syria will go to hell".

The Consultaive Gathering, a group of Shia and Sunni leaders in Baalbek-Hermel, also called on Hezbollah not to "interfere" in Syria. They said "Opening a front against the Syrian people and dragging Lebanon to war with the Syrian people is very dangerous and will have a negative impact on the relations between the two". Walid Jumblatt, leader of the Progressive Socialist Party, also called on Hezbollah to end its involvement and claimed that "Hezbollah is fighting inside Syria with orders from Iran".

According to the US, the Assad loyalist militia known as Jaysh al-Sha'bi was created and is maintained by Hezbollah and IRGC's elite Quds Force, both of whom provide it with money, weapons, training and military advisors.

== Armed strength ==
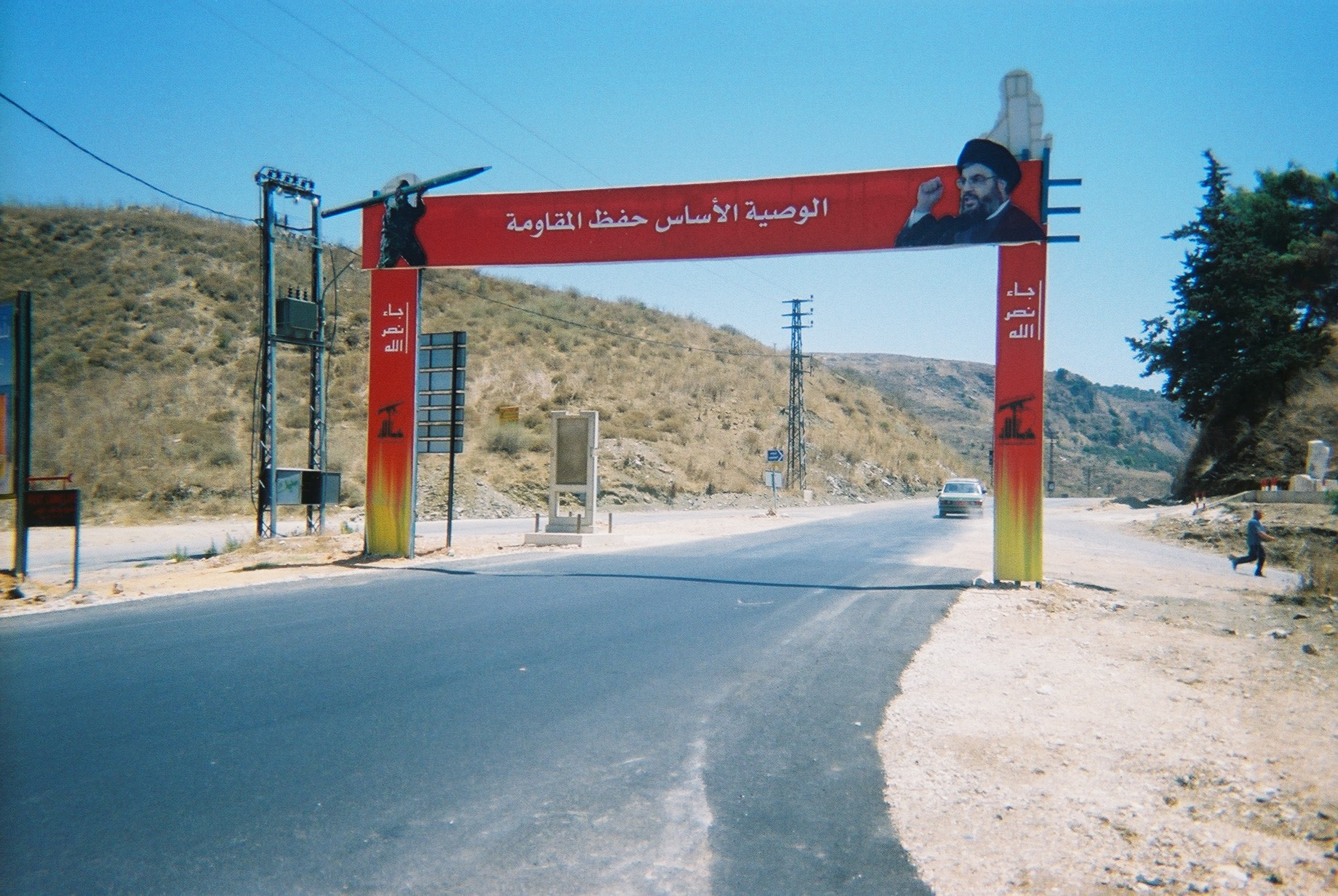
A sign commemorating Hezbollah in South Lebanon

Hezbollah has not revealed its armed strength. It has been estimated by Mustafa Alani, security director at the Dubai-based Gulf Research Centre, that Hezbollah's military force is made up of about 1,000 full-time Hezbollah members, along with a further 6,000-10,000 volunteers.

Hezbollah possesses the Katyusha-122 rocket, which has a range of 29 km (18 mi) and carries a 15-kg (33-lb) warhead. Hezbollah also possesses about 100 long-range missiles. They include the Iranian-made Fajr-3 and Fajr-5, the latter with a range of 75 km (47 mi), enabling it to strike the Israeli port of Haifa, and the Zelzal-1, with an estimated 150 km (93 mi) range, which can reach Tel Aviv. Fajr-3 missiles have a range of 40 km (25 mi) and a 45-kg (99-lb) warhead, and Fajr-5 missiles, which extend to 72 km (45 mi), also hold 45-kg (99-lb) warheads.

According to various reports, Hezbollah is armed with anti-tank guided missiles, namely, the Russian-made AT-3 Sagger, AT-4 Spigot, AT-5 Spandrel, AT-13 Saxhorn-2 'Metis-M', АТ-14 Spriggan 'Kornet'; Iranian-made Ra'ad (version of AT-3 Sagger), Towsan (version of AT-5 Spandrel), Toophan (version of BGM-71 TOW); and European-made MILAN missiles. These weapons have been used against IDF soldiers, causing many of the deaths during the 2006 Lebanon War. A small number of Saeghe-2s (Iranian-made version of M47 Dragon) were also used in the war.

For air defense, Hezbollah has anti-aircraft weapons that include the ZU-23 artillery and the man-portable, shoulder-fired SA-7 and SA-18 surface-to-air missile (SAM). One of the most effective weapons deployed by Hezbollah has been the C-701 anti-ship missile.

During the 2006 Lebanon War, Hezbollah fired 3,970 rockets into Northern Israel in the course of a month, killing 43 Israeli civilians. Hezbollah officials have stated that the group's armaments have recovered fully from the previous war; during the "Divine Victory" rally, held shortly after the cease-fire, Hezbollah's Secretary-General Sayyed Hassan Nasrallah declared that the group has "more than 20,000 rockets available". He spoke in retrospect of the war, saying "Tel Aviv or elsewhere, we were certain that we could reach any corner or spot in occupied Palestine and now we are certain that we can reach them." (sic) Nasrallah has implied that Hezbollah's rocket force became stronger in the months following the 2006 Lebanon War than it had been during the war itself.

Israeli Defense Minister Ehud Barak during IDF Armoured Corp exercises in the Golan Heights that "Hizbullah has gained significant strength in the last couple of years..We are closely following a possible violation [of UNSC Resolution 1701] caused by the transfer of advanced weapons systems from Syria to Hizbullah. The necessary preparations have been made, and regarding all the rest – I always prefer not to talk, rather to take action when the time comes." In August 2008 it was reported that Brigadier-General Muhammad Suleiman of Syria supplied Hizb'allah with advanced SA-8 SAMs for air defence. On 6 October 2012, a UAV allegedly operated by Hezbollah from Lebanon was shot down by the Israeli Air Force near Yatir Forest.

During April 2025 a multinational investigation has uncovered a Hezbollah logistics network operating across Europe, involving Spain, France, Germany, and the United Kingdom. This network facilitated the procurement of drone components, enabling the assembly of potentially hundreds of explosive-laden drones. Authorities in Spain and Germany have arrested four individuals linked to this operation, with a suspect in France indicted for terrorist conspiracy. The components seized match those found in drones used by Hezbollah against Israel, highlighting the group's extensive international supply chain. The investigation underscores the challenges European security services face in disrupting such clandestine networks.

== Intelligence capabilities ==
According to Israeli and American sources, Hezbollah has three units charged with intelligence operations.

One unit is responsible for intelligence activities against Israel, primarily by recruiting and running agents in order to gather information about Israeli military bases and other potential targets. This unit and is known to conduct SIGINT operations against IDF communications.

According to Michael Eisenstadt, of the Washington Institute for Near East Policy, Hezbollah also has a unit called Unit 1800 which aids Palestinians engaged in their operations, by providing funding, direction, weapons, and bomb-building instructions.

It is unknown what the third intelligence unit is.

== Targeting policy ==
After the September 11, 2001 attacks, Hezbollah condemned Al Qaeda for targeting the civilian World Trade Center, but remained silent on the attack on The Pentagon, neither favoring nor opposing the act. In a 2006 interview with the Washington Post, Hezbollah Secretary-General Hassan Nasrallah condemned violence against American civilians, saying, "[I]f there are American tourists, or intellectuals, doctors, or professors who have nothing to do with this war, they are innocent, even though they are Americans, and it is forbidden. It is not acceptable to harm them."

In June 2002, shortly after the Israeli government launched Operation Defensive Shield, Nasrallah gave a speech in which he defended and praised suicide bombings of Israeli civilians by members of Palestinian groups for "creating a deterrence and equalizing fear." Nasrallah stated that "in occupied Palestine, there is no difference between a soldier and a civilian, for they are all invaders, occupiers and usurpers of the land." Hezbollah has not been involved in any suicide bombing since Israel withdrew from Lebanon.

Hezbollah also denounced the Armed Islamic Group massacres in Algeria, Al-Gama'a al-Islamiyya attacks on tourists in Egypt, and the murder of Nick Berg.

== Disarmament ==
United Nations Security Council Resolution 1559 called for the disarmament of militia with the Taif agreement at the end of the Lebanese civil war. Hezbollah has denounced this resolution and protested against it. Its refusal to disarm has after the more recent conflict with Israel become controversial. Some still consider it a violation of the resolution and agreement and others now consider it a necessary and justified element of resistance. The official position of the Lebanese government is unclear, with conflicting statements given.

The Italian newspaper Corriere della Sera quoted Prime Minister Saniora was saying that, "Hezbollah has created, a 'state within a state,' adding: 'The entire world must help us disarm Hezbollah. But first we need to reach a cease-fire.'. According to a Forbes article, Saniora later denied these remarks, saying he "told the paper that 'the continued presence of Israeli occupation of Lebanese lands in the Chebaa Farms region is what contributes to the presence of Hezbollah weapons. The international community must help us in (getting) an Israeli withdrawal from Chebaa Farms so we can solve the problem of Hezbollah's arms'. Hezbollah denounced.

The former prime minister of Lebanon, Najib Mikati, stated that "in our terminology Hezbollah is not a militia, it is a resistance and we believe there is a difference between resistance and militia". Boutros Harb, a Lebanese lawmaker, spoke against Hezbollah's failure to disarm saying, "We can't have an illegal army at the heart of our state, all weapons must be held by the Lebanese government".

On 5 August 2006, the Prime Minister of Lebanon said that "the continued presence of Israeli occupation of Lebanese lands in the Shebaa Farms region is what contributes to the presence of Hezbollah weapons. The international community must help us in (getting) an Israeli withdrawal from Shebaa Farms so we can solve the problem of Hezbollah's arms".

An attempt made by the Lebanese government to disarm Hezbollah led to a new wave of violence in Lebanon at the first decade of May 2008. The militants belonging to Hezbollah and its allies have blocked Beirut airport as well as main city streets, paralyzing the life in the capital. On 8 May 2008, gun battles erupted between Hezbollah supporters and pro-government loyalists, while the leader of the organization called the government's decision "a declaration of war". Hezbollah took control of Western Beirut and after expelling pro-government militias from the city they then handed it over to the Lebanese Army. Later they also attempted to clear out Mount Lebanon of pro-government forces but failed due to heavy resistance, mainly from armed supporters of the Progressive Socialist Party.

== Ammonium nitrate storage ==
Die Welt reported, according to the intelligence information, that Hezbollah received a total of 270 tons of ammonium nitrate on July 16, 2013, delivered from Iran to Lebanon. On October 23 of the same year, another 270 tons of ammonium nitrate were delivered, in addition to a third delivery, which made the three deliveries equal to a quantity of 630 to 670 tons of ammonium nitrate. The second delivery was transported by plane, probably by Mahan Air, while the other deliveries were made by sea or land, for example across the Syrian border. Mohammad Qasir who has been responsible for Hezbollah's logistics for 20 years was also responsible for paying for the ammonium nitrate deliveries.

On 16 February 2016, General Secretary Nasrallah threatened that "some rockets are enough from us in addition to the ammonia containers in Haifa port, and their result will be that of a nuclear bomb in an area inhabited by 800,000 people, killing tens of thousands of them".

Hezbollah was accused by their Lebanese adversaries that ammonium nitrate stored at the Port of Beirut belonged to them, which later caused the Beirut explosion on 4 August 2020.

In September 2020, the U.S. state department's counterterrorism coordinator, Nathan Sales, mentioned in a video appearance at the American Jewish Committee that: "I can reveal that such [Hezbollah weapons] caches have been moved through Belgium to France, Greece, Italy, Spain and Switzerland. I can also reveal that significant ammonium nitrate caches have been discovered or destroyed in France, Greece, and Italy".

== See also ==
- Ideology of Hezbollah
- Hezbollah political activities
- Hezbollah foreign relations
- South Lebanon conflict (1985–2000)
- Unit 7900
- Unit 900
- Unit 910
- Unit 133
