= Jihad al-Bina =

Logo of the Jihād al-Binā' foundation, controlled by Hezbollah

Jihād al-Binā' (Arabic: جهاد البناء, meaning "Effort for Reconstruction") is a development foundation run by Hezbollah in Lebanon. The purpose of the organization is to help alleviate the consequences of the Lebanese Civil War and Hezbollah's resistance against Israel.

The organization is well known for infrastructure construction projects, educational projects, and helping shelter refugees of the various conflicts that have plagued Lebanon in the recent past. The foundation had built 1,200 homes by 1993 and 16,000 by 2006. The headquarters of Jihād al-Binā' are located in the southern suburbs of Beirut.

It is designated by the US OFAC as a Specially Designated Global Terrorist group, which allows the US to block the assets of foreign individuals and entities that commit, or pose a significant risk of committing, acts of terrorism.

== See also ==
- Jihad of Construction
