= Muhammad Fneish =

Lebanese politician (born 1953)

Muhammad Fneish (Arabic: محمد فنيش; born 1953) is a Shia Lebanese politician and member of Hezbollah. He represented Hezbollah in the Third Cabinet of Saad Hariri, serving as the Minister of Sports and Youth. As of 2026, he is under US sanctions based on Executive Order 13224.

== Early life ==
Fneish was born into a Shia family in Maaroub in 1953.

== Career ==
Before dealing with politics Fneish worked as a teacher. He became a member of the Hezbollah's 15-member central committee. In 1992, he was elected as a member of parliament for Hezbollah representing Bint Jbeil. He also won the same seat in the elections held in 1996 and 2000. He also ran for the seat in the 2005 general elections and got the highest votes in Tyre, namely 154,056 votes, surpassing Nabih Berri by about 1,000 votes. He was energy minister from July 2005 to November 2006. Prior to his appointment as energy minister, he served as a municipal council member in Tyre.

He was one of Hezbollah's six representatives in the government led by then prime minister Fouad Siniora until he and other Hezbollah members resigned from office in 2006. The reason for their resignation was Siniora's eagerness to sign the UN draft plan for the foundation of the Special Tribunal for Lebanon, which would search the assassination of Rafik Hariri, who was killed on 14 February 2005.

Fneish served as minister of labour in the next cabinet headed again by Siniora which was formed in 2008.

In the 2009 Lebanese general elections, Fneish won again a seat from Tyre as part of the 8 March alliance list. Then, he was appointed state minister for administrative reform in the cabinet of Saad Hariri, being one of two Hezbollah-backed ministers. The other Hezbollah minister in Hariri's cabinet was Hussein Al Hajj, in charge of agriculture ministry.

Fneish was named Minister of Youth and Sports in the December 2016 cabinet. He ran in the 2018 parliamentary elections and won.

He was renamed in the January 2019 cabinet as Minister of Youth and Sports.

== Sanctioned ==
In May 2026, Fneish was sanctioned by the US government, for his ties and support of Hezbollah. His name was added to the US Treasury Department OFAC's Specially Designated Nationals (SDN) and Blocked Persons List.

== Personal life ==
Fneish is married and has seven children. His brother Abdul Latif Fneish was convicted of importing counterfeit medicine into Lebanon to sell on the local market.
