= Fawzi Salloukh =

Lebanese politician

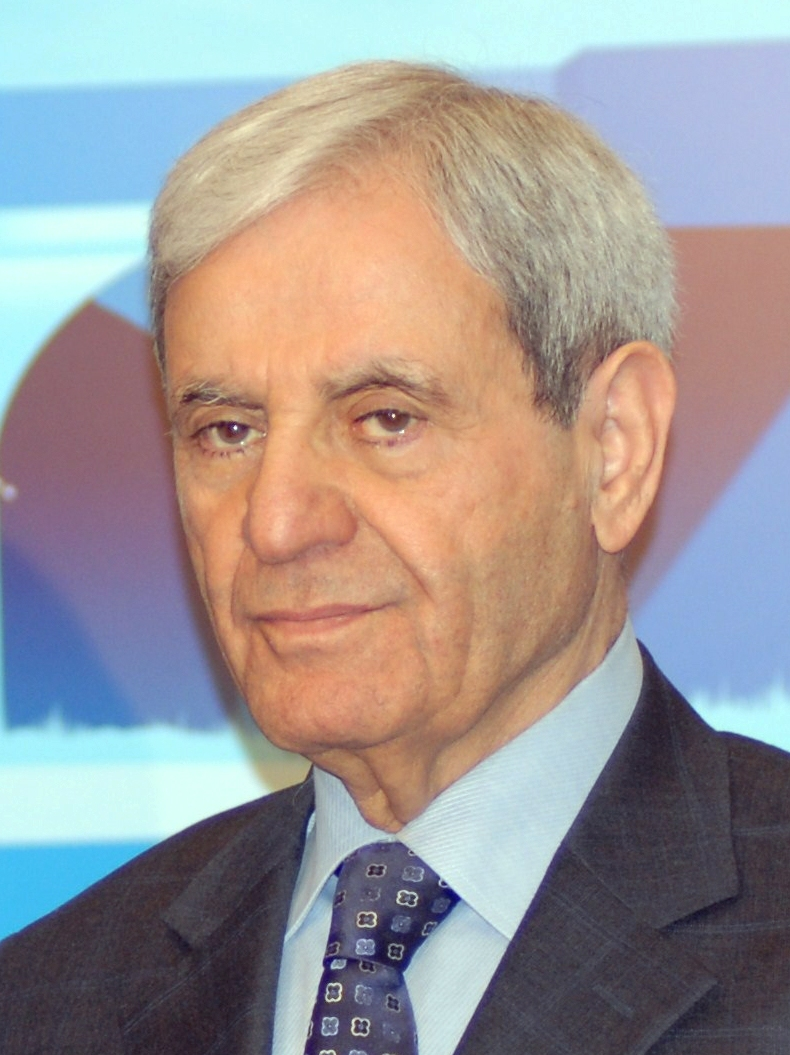
- Salloukh in 2009

Minister of Foreign Affairs and Emigrants
- In office 19 June 2005 – 9 November 2009
- Prime Minister: Fouad Siniora
- Preceded by: Mahmoud Hammoud
- Succeeded by: Ali Al Shami

Personal details
- Born: 1931 (age 94–95) Qmatiye, Lebanon
- Spouse: Hind Basma
- Children: 3
- Education: American University of Beirut

Fawzi Salloukh (born 1931) is a Lebanese politician, who served as Minister of Foreign Affairs from 19 July 2005 to 2009.

== Early life and education ==
Salloukh was born into a Shiite family in Qmatiye, Aley, Lebanon, in 1931. He graduated from the American University of Beirut in 1954 with a diploma in political Science.

== Career and alliances ==
Salloukh is a Lebanese career diplomat who served as ambassador to Sierra Leone (1964–1971), Nigeria (1978–1985), Algeria (1985–1987), Austria (1990–1994), and Belgium (1994–1995). He also served as Lebanon's ambassador to the European Union. At the beginning of the 1970s, he was director of economic affairs at the ministry of foreign affairs. He retired after his tenure as ambassador to Belgium. Then he worked as the secretary general of the Islamic University in Lebanon from 1998 to 2005.

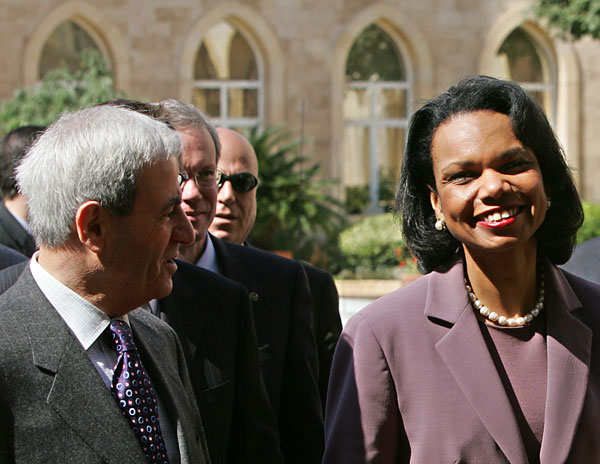
Salloukh with Condoleezza Rice on February 23, 2006

In July 2005, he was appointed foreign minister to the cabinet led by then prime minister Fouad Siniora. Salloukh was proposed by Hizbollah to this post when Hizbollah's own candidates for the post were not accepted due to international pressure. He was a moderate figure, and the Amal movement endorsed his appointment.

He resigned from office with other four Shiite ministers in November 2006. The reason for their resignation was Siniora's eagerness to sign the UN draft plan for the foundation of the Special Tribunal for Lebanon, which would search the assassination of Rafik Hariri, who was killed on 14 February 2005.

Salloukh was again appointed to the same post in the cabinet headed by Fouad Siniora in July 2008. His tenure lasted until 2009, and he was succeeded by Ali Shami.

== Personal life ==
Salloukh is married to Hind Basma and has three children.

== See also ==
- Lebanese government of July 2005
- Lebanese government of July 2008
