= Hezbollah–Iran relations =

Iranian support for Hezbollah

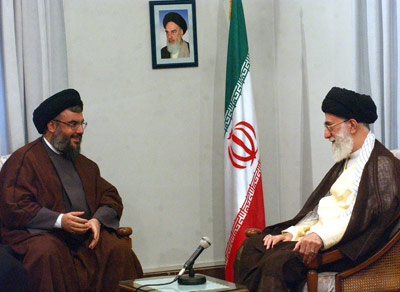
A meeting between Supreme Leader of Iran Ali Khamenei and Secretary-General of Hezbollah Hassan Nasrallah in 2005

The Islamic Republic of Iran is a key patron of the Lebanese Shia Islamist militia and political party Hezbollah.

Iranian support, including financial aid, deployment of Revolutionary Guards, and training, has played an important role in Hezbollah's formation and development. Hezbollah has functioned as Iran's proxy since its inception, and is considered to be part of the "Axis of Resistance".

Hezbollah itself, founded in 1982, originated as an Iranian-backed Shi'ite militant group in Lebanon. The organization's founders adopted the model outlined by Ayatollah Khomeini after the 1979 Iranian Revolution, and its forces were trained by a contingent of Revolutionary Guards from Iran. Hezbollah officially aligned itself with the Iranian regime in 1985, and the close relationship between Hezbollah and Iran has persisted ever since.

Iran considers its relationship with Hezbollah as crucial, as it provides Iran with a means to expand its influence in the Levant, exert pressure on Israel and US interests, discourage any attempts at regime change, and uphold its ideological commitments.

Hezbollah has received substantial financial support from Iran, estimated to range from $700 million to $1 billion annually. Additionally, Iran provides weapons, training, and other forms of assistance to Hezbollah.

== Background ==
Hezbollah was established in 1982 by young Shi’a Lebanese clerics who had studied in Najaf. The organization adopted the model outlined by Ayatollah Khomeini after the 1979 Iranian Revolution, and its founders chose the name "Hezbollah" as instructed by Khomeini. Lebanese Hezbollah, or the "Party of God," emerged from an Iranian initiative to unite various militant Shi’a groups in Lebanon during a period of domestic and regional instability, particularly the country's civil war. The organization is considered by some an attempt by Lebanon's historically marginalized Shi’a Muslims to assert economic and political influence

Hezbollah's forces were trained and organized by a contingent of 1,500 Revolutionary Guards from Iran, with permission from the Syrian government. They were allowed to transit through the eastern highlands of Syrian-controlled Lebanon and establish a base in the Bekaa Valley during Lebanon's occupation.

Iranian support, including the deployment of Revolutionary Guards and financial aid, played a significant role in Hezbollah's formation and development. Initially, Hezbollah operated as a network of radical Shia paramilitary groups with shared strategic goals, such as establishing an Islamic republic, but differing on tactical matters.

Following the opening of the 1982 war marked by Israel's invasion of Lebanon some 800 Revolutionary Guards were sent to Lebanon through Syria to help recruit Hezbollahi, provide political and religious indoctrination and military training, including instruction in terrorist tactics.

In July 1982, Iran reacted to the war by deploying 1,500 Islamic Revolutionary Guard Corps (IRGC) advisers to Lebanon's Bekaa Valley with the aim of establishing and training a new Shiite militia, which later transformed into Hezbollah. The approximately 1,500 Pasdaran set up their headquarters in the Syrian-controlled Beqaa Valley, where they organized training camps. Under the supervision of the Iranian Revolutionary Guard Corps (IRGC), the fighters underwent guerrilla training, and military material was established in the Bekaa Valley in 1982. Iran sent a contingent of Revolutionary Guards to Lebanon, ostensibly to combat the Israeli invaders. Iran provided financial support to the newly-formed Islamist groups, including Hezbollah.

In 1985, Hezbollah officially aligned itself with the Iranian regime and Ayatollah Khomeini's leadership. Hezbollah has functioned as Iran's proxy since its inception, and it is estimated that Iran provides substantial financial support, ranging from $700 million to $1 billion annually.

== Islamic Jihad Organisation proxy ==
Hezbollah adopted the alias Islamic Jihad Organization to create plausible deniability and obscure its connection with Iran.

Despite attempts to maintain separation, evidence, including declassified information, revealed the close relationship between Hezbollah, its Islamic Jihad terrorist wing, and Iran.

In 1983 the CIA reported that Islamic Jihad “more likely is a cover used by Iran for its terrorist operations, whether employing local Shias in Lebanon or locally recruited agents of other nationalities” and that “[s]urrogates provide Iran with an excellent means for creating the illusion that an independent, international organization is at work against U.S. interests.”

The use of the Islamic Jihad alias was an attempt to create the illusion of an independent, international organization working against U.S. interests. While initially loosely organized, Iran played a key role in transforming Islamic Jihad into the organized entity known as Hezbollah. The formalization and professionalization of Hezbollah occurred through substantial support from Iran, including money, weaponry, personnel, training, and guidance.

Iranian embassy officials in Damascus and the IRGC were actively involved in coordinating radical Shi’a activities through the Council of Lebanon, within Lebanon. According to US intelligence, thus solidifying Hezbollah as a significant arm of Iran's military apparatus. Iranian auxiliaries were embedded within Hezbollah units, sharing communication and support networks.

== Ideological and religious influence ==
Iranian influence took shape through shared ideological, cultural, and religious principles derived from the Iranian Revolution and the concept of waliyat al-faqih (guardianship of the jurist).

Hezbollah embraced Ayatollah Khomeini's revolutionary message and its clerics committed to establishing a fundamentalist state on a global scale. The early growth of Hezbollah can be attributed to the influence of Iranian-trained clerics and a dedication to Ayatollah Khomeini and the mission of sparking an Islamic revolution in Lebanon.

The close connection between the Shi’a religious hierarchy in Lebanon and Iran is also historical and through familial ties, involving the training of Lebanese clerics in Iran, intermarriage with Iranian clerical families, and the propagation of Iranian theological discourse. Beyond educational and familial routes, Iranian ideology permeated Lebanon through official channels, with the IRGC in Lebanon providing not only paramilitary and terrorist skills but also political and religious indoctrination. In 1987, the CIA emphasized that while an independent Islamic fundamentalist movement might have emerged in Lebanon, Iranian support significantly accelerated its development.

== Hezbollah autonomy ==
Hezbollah has sought to present an image of autonomy. The organization's founding statement “to determine our fate by our own hands”. Hezbollah, whilst advocating an Iran-inspired Islamist regime, states that it wishes for the Lebanese to have freedom of determination.

== Financial funding ==
Hezbollah receives funding from several sources including the Bashar Al-Assad regime in Syria, the Lebanese diaspora, international crime and legal businesses.

Iran is believed to provide substantial financial support to Hezbollah, ranging from at least $100 million to a potentially higher figure of around $200 million annually. In 2020 according to the state department, Hezbollah received US$700 million from Iran.

This increased funding is thought to align with Iran's interest in destabilizing the Israeli-Palestinian conflict, according to US intelligence, Hezbollah serves as a key proxy in achieving this objective. The support extends beyond cash funds, with Iranian cargo planes delivering weapons, including rockets and small arms, to Hezbollah in Lebanon. Material assistance is also channeled through purportedly private charities closely affiliated with Iran's revolutionary elite.

Hezbollah has obtained weaponry supplied by Iran, including 11,500 missiles deployed in southern Lebanon. 3,000 Hezbollah militants have undergone training in Iran, covering various skills such as guerrilla warfare, missile and rocket artillery firing, unmanned drone operation, naval warfare, and conventional military operations.

Iran provides financial and material aid and offers training, establishing training programs and camps. For instance, as of August 2002, Iran was reported to have financed and established terrorist training camps in the Syrian-controlled Beka'a Valley to train Hezbollah, Hamas, Palestinian Islamic Jihad (PIJ), and PFLP-GC terrorists. Iran has consistently supported Hezbollah's involvement in the Palestinian-Israeli conflict, assigning Imad Mughniyeh, Hezbollah's international operations commander, to assist Palestinian militant groups such as Hamas and PIJ.

Iran's financially supports Hezbollah affiliated media, notably the television station al-Manar, called the "station of resistance."

Iran according to the US indirectly funds al-Manar, contributing to its approximately $15 million annual budget, with estimates suggesting Iran provides $100–200 million per year to Hezbollah, which is then transferred to the TV station.

In November 2025, it was reported that The U.S. Treasury sanctioned three individuals (Ossama Jaber, Ja’far Muhammad Qasir, and Samer Kasbar) who are linked to Hezbollah, for trafficking millions from Iran through Lebanon's cash based economy in 2025. These sanctions freeze their US assets and block American dealings with them.

== Weapons ==
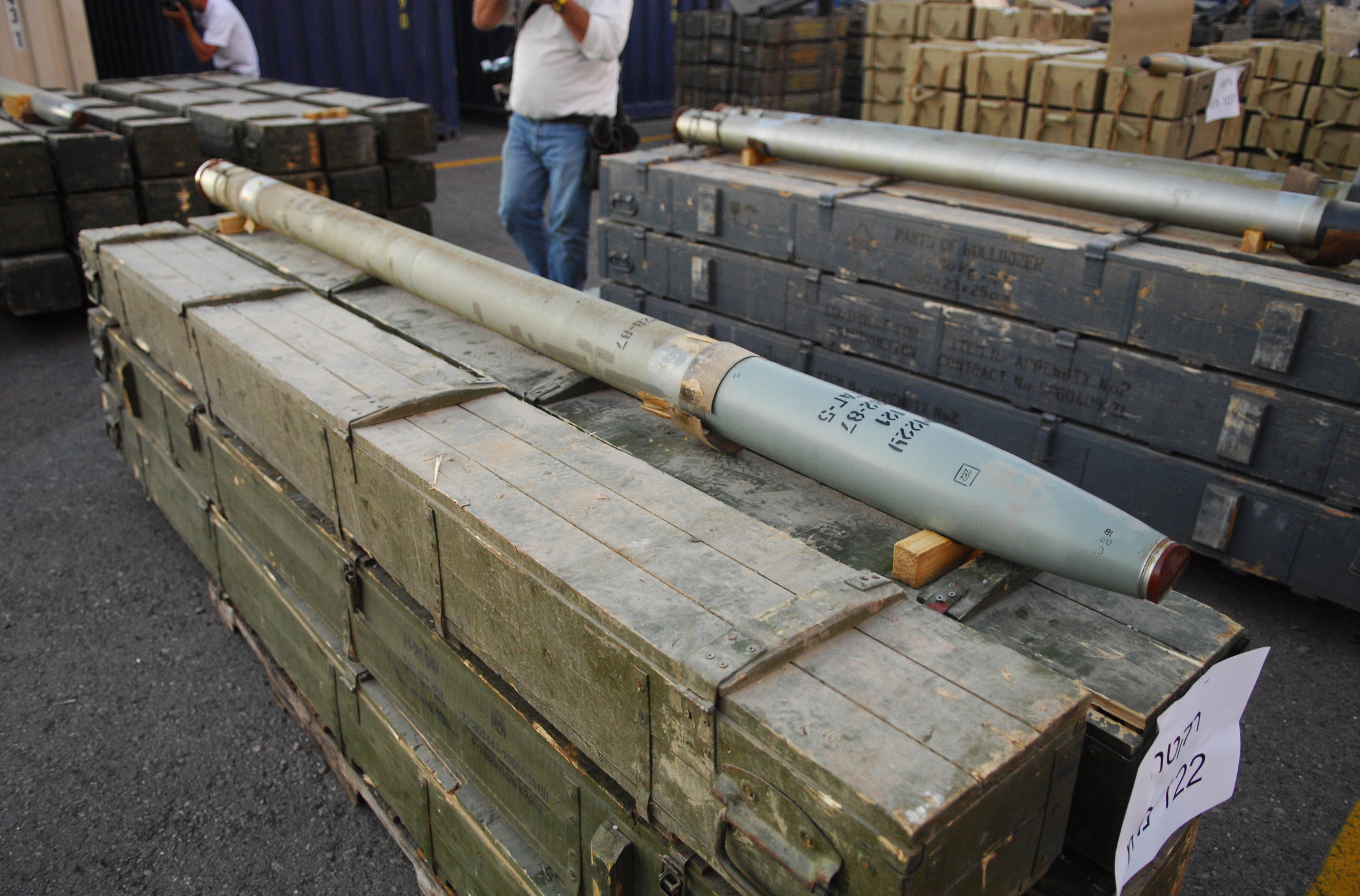
Missiles found abroad Francop

Hezbollah has obtained weaponry supplied by Iran, with 11,500 missiles already positioned in southern Lebanon. 3,000 Hezbollah militants have completed training in Iran, covering various aspects such as guerrilla warfare, missile and rocket artillery firing, operation of unmanned drones, naval warfare, and conventional military operations.

Mahmoud Ali Suleiman, the Hezbollah operative captured by the IDF in August 2006 for his involvement in the kidnapping of two Israeli soldiers during a cross-border raid on July 12, confessed during his interrogation to receiving weapons training and religious instruction in Iran. He informed interrogators that he traveled in a civilian car to Damascus and then flew to Iran. Apart from the Russian-made Katyusha, Hezbollah's reported artillery cache consists entirely of Iranian-made weapons.

== History ==
=== 1980s-2006 ===
In June 1985, Hezbollah hijacked TWA Flight 847, demanding the release of 700 Shiite Muslims. The hijackers, with logistical support from Iran, engaged in a campaign that included killing a U.S. Navy diver and threatening Jewish passengers. Hezbollah has denied its involvement.

On March 27, 1992, Islamic Jihad, a group linked to Hezbollah, claimed responsibility for a suicide bombing outside the Israeli Embassy in Buenos Aires, resulting in 20 deaths and 252 injuries. The US National Security Agency and the Israeli intelligence found that the highest levels of the Iranian government had authorized the attack. Seven Iranian diplomats were expelled from Argentina after the Argentine government stated they had convincing proof of Iranian involvement.

On July 18, 1998, in Islamic Jihad took credit for a blast outside the Argentine-Israeli Mutual Association in Buenos Aires, resulting in 95 fatalities and 200 injuries. In 2004, Argentine intelligence determined that a 21-year-old Hezbollah operative executed the attack with logistical support from Iran. The bombing is the deadliest terrorist incident in Argentina. In 2006, Argentine authorities issued an international arrest warrant for Ali Fallahian, the head of Iranian intelligence, accusing him of orchestrating the operation. Subsequently, in 2007, INTERPOL added Ali Fallahian, along with four other Iranian officials and one Hezbollah member, to its most wanted list, citing their purported involvement in the bombing.

May 17, 1995: Iranian Supreme Leader Ayatollah Ali Khamenei appointed Hezbollah Secretary General Hassan Nasrallah and Shura Council member Mohammad Yazbek as his religious representatives in Lebanon.

June 25, 1996: Hezbollah, with Iranian support, claimed responsibility for a truck bombing near Khobar Towers in Saudi Arabia, killing 19 and injuring 500. In 2001, a US federal court alleged that an Iranian officer was involved in the directing of the operation.

Aug. 1, 2005: Nasrallah met with Supreme Leader Khamenei and President Ahmadinejad in Tehran.

== 2006 Lebanon War ==
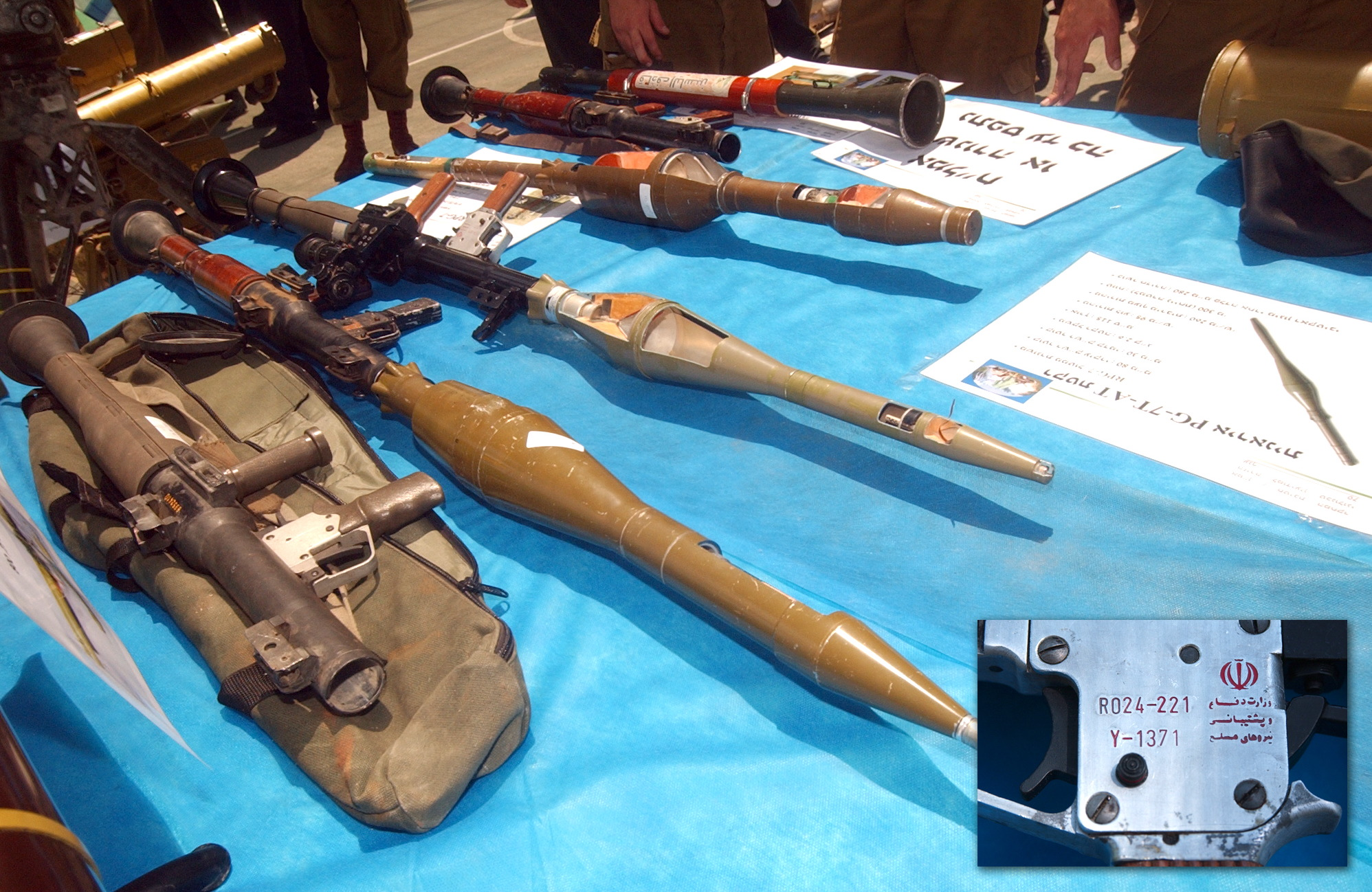
An Iranian missile, found in a Hezbollah stash, 2006

Jane's Defence Weekly, a defense industry magazine, disclosed on August 4, 2006, that during the 2006 Israel-Lebanon conflict, Hezbollah formally requested Iran to provide a continuous stream of weapons to bolster its operations against Israel. According to Western diplomatic sources cited in the report, Iranian authorities assured Hezbollah of an ongoing supply of weapons for "the next stage of the confrontation".

Iran has denied supplying Hezbollah with weapons. Multiple reports have consistently pointed to the contrary. Mohtashami Pur, a former ambassador to Lebanon and the current secretary-general of the 'Intifada conference,' stated in an Iranian newspaper that Iran had supplied the missiles to the Shiite militia. He further emphasized that Hezbollah had the endorsement of his country to deploy the weapons in defense of Lebanon.

The Israel Defense Forces regard Hezbollah as virtually an arm of the Iranian armed forces; a senior Israeli defence official told Jane's Defence Weekly that "we should consider that what we are facing in Lebanon is not a militia but rather a special forces brigade of the Iranian Army."

During a 2007 interview with the Iranian Arabic-language TV station al-Qawthar, Hezbollah Deputy Secretary-General Naim Kassem stated that the endorsement of the ayatollahs in Tehran is necessary for all suicide bombings and other operations in Lebanon. In 2008, Iran commemorated a recently deceased Hezbollah leader by issuing a postage stamp.

== 2026 Iran war ==
During the 2026 Iran war, Hezbollah senior leader Wafiq Safa said that "Hezbollah and Iran are two souls in one body. There is no Hezbollah without Iran, and no Iran without Hezbollah," describing the relationship as "religious, legitimate, and doctrinal."

== Timeline ==
- 2007: Nasrallah visited Damascus, Syria, meeting with Iranian President Ahmadinejad.
- 2010: The leaders of Hezbollah, Syria and Iran meet in Damascus.
- May 2008: Hezbollah operatives planned a bomb attack against the Israeli embassy in Baku, Azerbaijan in retaliation of the killing of Imad Mughniyah, but Azerbaijani authorities foiled the plot, revealing alleged IRGC-ordered attacks against U.S., Israeli, and Western embassies.
- February 26, 2010: Syrian President Bashar al-Assad hosted Iranian President Ahmadinejad and Nasrallah.
- October 13–14, 2010: President Ahmadinejad visited Lebanon, expressing anti-Zionist sentiments in Bint Jbeil and meeting with Nasrallah.
- December 16, 2010: Iran reportedly reduced funding to Hezbollah by 40 percent due to international sanctions over its nuclear program.
- February 7, 2012: Nasrallah acknowledged Iran's comprehensive support for Hezbollah since 1982, rejecting U.S. allegations of money laundering and drug smuggling.
- February 13, 2012: Coordinated bombing attempts in India and Georgia targeted Israeli embassy personnel, with Israel attributing the operations to Tehran and Hezbollah.
- July 18, 2012: A suicide bombing at Sarafovo Airport in Bulgaria killed six Israeli tourists and a Bulgarian driver, leading Israel to blame Hezbollah and Iran.
- October 11, 2012: Nasrallah confirmed Hezbollah's drone incursion into Israel, boasting of Iran's support in assembling the drone in Lebanon.
- May 25, 2013: Nasrallah admitted Hezbollah's involvement in Syria, emphasizing Syria's role as the resistance's backbone.
- April 14, 2014: In Southeast Asia, a Hezbollah network involved in a failed truck-bombing targeting the Israeli embassy in Bangkok had close ties to Iranian intelligence agents, indicating the interconnected nature of their operations. These instances highlight the direct contacts each Hezbollah cell maintains with senior Hezbollah and/or Iranian intelligence operatives.
- November 22, 2014: IRGC General claimed Iran provided Hezbollah with Fateh missiles capable of reaching any target in Israel.
- January 18, 2015: Israeli airstrike killed IRGC General Allah-Dadi and six Hezbollah fighters in Syria's Golan Heights.
- December 22, 2016: Hezbollah played a key role in aiding the Syrian government, an Iranian ally in their victory against rebels in a pivotal battle.
- September 2019: With the support of Iran, Hezbollah reportedly established a facility in the Bekaa Valley for manufacturing precision-guided missiles.
- January 5, 2020: Following the killing of Iranian Revolutionary Guards’ general Qassem Soleimani, Hezbollah Secretary General, Hassan Nasrallah pledged to push U.S. forces out of the Middle East to avenge Gen. Qassem Soleimani's killing.
- February 9, 2022: Nasrallah said “a strong regional state and any war with it will blow up the entire region”, he denied automatic obedience to Tehran, stating Hezbollah's actions are for Lebanon's sake.
- October 12, 2023: Iranian Foreign Minister met Nasrallah in Beirut to discuss the war between Hamas and Israel, in the meeting, Hezbollah expressed readiness to respond to Israeli acts.
- July 10, 2024: Newly elected Iranian president Masoud Pezeshkian promises support to Hezbollah leader Hassan Nasrallah and other Islamic resistance and jihadi groups according to IRNA, Iranian state media.
- April 1, 2026: Iranian supreme leader, Mojtaba Khamenei, sent a letter to Hezbollah leader, Naim Qassem, promising continued Iranian support for Hezbollah and expressing his gratitude for his condolences following his father and former supreme leaders death, Ali Khamenei.

== See also ==
- Iran and state-sponsored terrorism
- Iran–Lebanon relations
- Hezbollah foreign relations
- Iranian influence in Lebanon
- Iranian support for Hamas
- Iranian support for the Houthis
