= Second cabinet of Fouad Siniora =

This is the list of the Lebanese government that was formed by Fouad Siniora on 11 July 2008. In the cabinet, the opposition had eleven of the thirty seats.

== Composition ==
Lebanese government of July 2008
Portfolio	Minister	Political affiliation	Religious Sect
President Emile Lahoud's Share (3/30)
Minister of Interior	Ziad Baroud	Independent	Maronite
Minister of Defense	Elias Murr	Independent	Greek Orthodox
Minister of State	Joe Takla	Independent	Greek Catholic
March 14 Alliance (16/30)
Prime Minister	Fouad Siniora	Future Movement	Sunni
Minister of Finance	Mohammad Chatah	Future Movement	Sunni
Minister of Education	Bahia Hariri	Future Movement	Sunni
Minister of Culture	Tammam Salam	Future Movement	Sunni
Minister of State	Khaled Kabbani	Future Movement	Sunni
Minister of Information	Tarek Mitri	Future Movement	Greek Orthodox
State Minister	Jean Ogassapian	Future Movement	Armenian Catholic
Minister of Public Works	Ghazi Aridi	Progressive Socialist Party	Druze
Minister of State	Wael Abou Faour	Progressive Socialist Party	Druze
Minister of Environment	Antoine Karam	Lebanese Forces	Maronite
Minister of Justice	Ibrahim Najjar	Lebanese Forces	Greek Orthodox
Minister of Tourism	Elie Marouni	Kataeb Party	Maronite
Minister of State	Nassib Lahoud	Democratic Renewal	Maronite
Minister of Economy and Trade	Mohammad Safadi	Tripoli Bloc	Sunni
Minister of Displaced	Raymond Audi	Independent	Greek Catholic
Minister of State	Ibrahim Chamseddine	Independent	Shia
March 8 Alliance (11/30)
Deputy Prime Minister & Minister of State	Issam Abu Jamra	Free Patriotic Movement	Greek Orthodox
Minister of Telecommunications	Gebran Bassil	Free Patriotic Movement	Maronite
Minister of Social Affairs	Mario Aoun	Free Patriotic Movement	Maronite
Minister of Public Health	Mohammad Khalifeh	Amal Movement	Shia
Minister of Industry	Ghazi Zeaiter	Amal Movement	Shia
Minister of Labor	Muhammad Fneish	Hezbollah	Shia
Minister of Youth and Sports	Talal Arslan	Lebanese Democratic Party	Druze
Minister of Energy and Water	Alain Tabourian	ARF	Armenian Orthodox
Minister of Agriculture	Elias Skaff	Popular Bloc	Greek Catholic
Minister of State	Ali Qanso	Syrian Social Nationalist Party	Shia
Minister of Foreign Affairs	Fawzi Salloukh	Independent	Shia

Preceded by Lebanese government of July 2005	List of Lebanese governments	Succeeded by Lebanese government of November 2009

== Sources ==
- National Unity Government
