= Foreign relations of Hezbollah =

Hezbollah has a Foreign Relations Unit (Arabic: وحدة العلاقات الخارجية, romanized: Wahdat al-‘Ilāqāt al-khārijiyya) and maintains relations with a number of foreign countries and entities. These are particularly Shia states, but also Sunni groups like those affiliated with the Palestinian cause; and the group is also suggested to have operations outside the Middle East in places such as Latin America and North Korea.

Hezbollah has especially close relations with Iran, with the former Alawite leadership in Syria, specifically with President Hafez al-Assad (until his death in 2000) and his son and successor Bashar al-Assad (until he was otherthrown in 2024), and has sent fighters in support of Assad in the Syrian Civil War. Hezbollah declared its support for the now-concluded Al-Aqsa Intifada.

There is little evidence of ongoing Hezbollah contact or cooperation with al-Qaeda. Hezbollah's leaders deny links to al-Qaeda, present or past. Al-Qaeda leaders, such as former al-Qaeda in Iraq leader Abu Musab al-Zarqawi, consider Shia, which most Hezbollah members are, to be apostates, as do Salafi-jihadis today.

The 9/11 Commission Report, however, found that several al-Qaeda operatives and top military commanders were sent to Hezbollah training camps in Lebanon in 1994.

== Position of the UN ==
UN Security Council Resolution 1559, calls for "the disbanding and disarmament of all Lebanese and non-Lebanese militia", echoing the Taif Agreement that ended the Lebanese Civil War, but does not explicitly include Hezbollah although Kofi Annan has advanced this interpretation. The Lebanese Government and Hezbollah dispute the application of this resolution to Hezbollah, referring to it as a "resistance movement" and not a militia. Israel has lodged complaints about Hezbollah's actions with the UN.

The UN's Deputy Secretary-General, Mark Malloch Brown, contests characterisations of the Lebanese militia as a terrorist organisation in the mould of al-Qaeda. While acknowledging that "Hezbollah employs terrorist tactics," he says that it is unhelpful to call it a terrorist organization; the United States and the international community, in his view, would do well to respect it as a legitimate political party. On the other end of the spectrum, there are some in the United Nations who deny that Hezbollah's military activities against civilians are terrorist in nature at all.

== Iran ==
In a 20 July 2006 article, scholar Fred Halliday wrote that Sheikh Naim Qassem, deputy leader of Hezbollah under Sheikh Hassan Nasrallah, told him Hezbollah follows Iran's leadership as a matter of principle.

== Syria ==
In an interview on Al-Arabiya TV in Dubai, former Hezbollah Secretary-General Subhi al-Tufayli said: "Hezbollah definitely fosters its relations with the Syrians, but Hezbollah's real leadership is 'the rule of the jurists'."

Though Hezbollah presence in Syria was limited before 2012, Damascus had been the most important facilitator of Iranian support to the group and became increasingly active as a provider of material and political assistance on its own in the 2000s.

Beginning in 2012, Hezbollah aided the Ba'athist Syrian government during the Syrian Civil War in the fight against the rebels, which Hezbollah has described as a Wahhabi-Zionist conspiracy to destroy its alliance with Syria against Israel.

Hezbollah's co-operation Syria ended in 2024 when the Assad regime was overthrown.

== Relationships to other Islamic movements ==
=== Hamas ===
According to Israeli author Ehud Yaari, Hezbollah's presence and strategy in Lebanon is a model for Hamas in terms of military, political, and media operations. The two groups share common tactics and common goals. According to Israeli military analysts, Hezbollah has assisted Hamas in producing "[more] lethal bombs." After the start of the al-Aqsa Intifada in September 2000, Hezbollah's leader Nasrallah declared his organization's support for the intifada supported by the PLO, Hamas, Islamic Jihad, and other organizations. Hezbollah began also to broadcast "continuous" anti-Israeli propaganda into Palestinian homes on its al-Manar television station, a tactic that reportedly led to the Hezbollah station becoming widely watched in Palestinian homes.

In 2013, it was reported that Hezbollah had ordered Hamas to leave Lebanon, on account of Hamas' support for forces fighting against the Syrian government of President Bashar al-Assad. Both Hamas and the Lebanese Islamic Jihad denied these reports.

=== Islamic Courts Union ===
The United Nations reported that the Islamic Courts Union, which had taken over much of Somalia during 2006, had sent its troops to fight the Israeli Defense Forces alongside Hezbollah during the 2006 Lebanon War. The UN claimed that Hezbollah had repaid the ICU by offering military training and weaponry from Iran and Syria. Of the 700 fighters the ICU reportedly sent, several hundred remained in Lebanon for special training. An arms monitoring report allegedly Hezbollah had armed the ICU with "...anti-aircraft missiles, grenade launchers, machine guns, ammunition, medicine, uniforms and other supplies". The Israelis claimed that they "were aware" of a ICU presence in Lebanon, though the ICU described the reports as "baseless propaganda" and Hezbollah rejected them as "incorrect and silly".

=== Alleged relationship with al-Qaeda ===
There is no concrete evidence of Hezbollah contact or cooperation with al-Qaida. US and Israeli counter-terrorism officials claim that Hezbollah has (or had) links to Al Qaeda, although Hezbollah's leaders deny these allegations. United States intelligence officials also speculate there has been contact between Hezbollah and low-level al-Qaeda figures who fled Afghanistan for Lebanon. Ali Mohamed testified that Hezbollah trained al-Qaeda operatives on how to use explosives. In addition, Hezbollah and Al-Qaeda cooperate through money laundering, smuggling, and document forgeries. Some American newspapers have suggested a broader alliance between Hezbollah, al-Qaeda, and the Iranian Revolutionary Guard.

Al-Qaeda leaders, such as former al-Qaeda in Iraq leader Abu Musab al-Zarqawi, consider Shia, which most Hezbollah members are, to be apostates, as do Salafi-jihadis today.

On the other hand, others point out that al-Qaeda's Sunni ideology is fundamentally incompatible with Hezbollah's relatively liberal brand of Shia Islam; in fact, some Wahhabi leaders and al-Qaeda members consider Hezbollah to be apostate. There was a fatwa issued several years ago by Abdullah Ibn Jibreen, a former member of Saudi Arabia's Council of Senior Ulema, which describes Hezbollah as "rafidhi" – a derogatory term for Shiites used by some Sunni fanatics. Even during 2006 Israel-Lebanon conflict it was cited by some hardline Sunni Muslim clerics and others writing on Islamist website.

Al-Qaeda has demonstrated its distaste for Shi'as in suicide bombings and attacks on Shi'a civilian targets in Iraq. Hezbollah denies any ties to al-Qaeda and al-Qaeda leader Abu Musab al-Zarqawi has issued an audio recording in which he called Hezbollah an "enemy of Sunnis." Saint Petersburg Times, ABC News, and MSNBC report that there exists no evidence of a connection between Hezbollah and al-Qaeda. Nasrallah has denied links to al-Qaeda, present or past, stating in a 2002 interview that the two groups work in different areas and face different enemies. Hezbollah's aim has been to confront, and ultimately destroy, Israel, while bin Laden has focused on Afghanistan, Bosnia, and the former Yugoslavia.

Michel Samaha, Lebanon's former minister of information, has said that Hezbollah has been an important ally of the government in the war against terrorist groups, and described the "American attempt to link Hezbollah to al-Qaeda" to be "astonishing".

As part of a surge of intersectarian support for Hezbollah during the 2006 Israel-Lebanon conflict, Ayman al-Zawahiri, al-Qaeda's deputy leader, called for Muslims to rise up in a holy war against Zionists and join the fighting in Lebanon.

Hezbollah is also fighting against the Al-Qaeda affiliated Al-Nusra Front, later became Tahrir al-Sham Syrian rebel group in the Syrian Civil War on the same side as Assad's pro-government forces.

=== al-Mahdi Army ===
Hezbollah claims that it forbids its fighters entry into Iraq for any reason, and that no Hezbollah units or individual fighters have entered Iraq to support any Iraqi faction fighting the United States. On 2 April 2004, Iraqi cleric and Mahdi Army founder Muqtada al-Sadr announced his intention to form chapters of Hezbollah and Hamas in Iraq, and Mahdi senior member Abu Mujtaba claimed they were choosing 1,500 fighters to go to Lebanon.

=== Palestinian Islamic Jihad Movement ===
There have been American claims that Hezbollah has engaged in joint operations with the Sunni Palestinian militant group Palestinian Islamic Jihad Movement. The Islamic Jihad Movement has sent "its gratitude to the brothers in Hezbollah, the Islamic resistance in South Lebanon. Particularly Hassan Nasrallah, for their stance and support, be it financial, military or moral support".

== Other non-state allies ==
- Liwa Abu al-Fadhal al-Abbas
- Liwa al-Quds
- Kata'ib Sayyid al-Shuhada
- Kata'ib Hezbollah
- Asa'ib Ahl al-Haq
- Harakat Hezbollah al-Nujaba
- Liwa Fatemiyoun
- Liwq Zulfiqar
- Baqir Brigade
- (Sahrawi Arab Democratic Republic) Polisario Front (Alleged, denied by Hezbollah)
- Plurinational Association of Tawantinsuyo Reservists (Alleged, denied by Hezbollah)
- Wagner Group

== Europe ==
=== European Union ===
In July 2013, the European Union designated the armed wing of Hezbollah as a terrorist organization. The foreign ministers of all 28 EU countries agreed to the decision which was based on concerns over Hezbollah's role in the 2012 Burgas bus bombing and the organizations involvement in Syrian civil war supporting the Ba'ath government.

A few of the EU member states have imposed partial or complete prohibitions on Hezbollah. The Netherlands proscribed the organisation fully, while the United Kingdom has proscribed Hezbollah's paramilitary External Security Organization, but not the organisation's political wing. On 25 February 2019 the UK parliament announced that it would introduce new rules to classify Hezbollah in its entirety as a terrorist organisation as "UK authorities say they are no longer able to distinguish between the group's military and political wings." A 2018 research initiative found strong links between Hezbollah and illegal activity in Germany and this garnered a substantial response from the German public, asking to condemn Hezbollah's political wing as well. Germany banned Hezbollah entirely 30 April 2020.

==== Drone smuggling investigation ====
In April 2025 a multinational investigation uncovered a Hezbollah logistics network operating across Europe, involving Spain, France, Germany, and the United Kingdom. This network facilitated the procurement of drone components, enabling the assembly of potentially hundreds of explosive-laden drones.

The investigation started in Catalonia, Spain, where the Civil Guard identified suspicious purchases of materials associated with unmanned aerial vehicle (UAV) production. These materials included electronic guidance systems, propulsion propellers, gasoline and electric engines, and raw materials for drone bodies and wings. Authorities estimate that the seized components could have been used to assemble hundreds, potentially thousands, of drones capable of carrying several kilograms of explosives. On July 14, 2024, coordinated efforts between Spanish and German authorities led to the arrest of four suspects: two in Barcelona, one in nearby Badalona, and another in Salzgitter, Germany. The suspects were accused of acquiring materials that could be converted into weapons targeting civilian and military sites in Israel and Europe. Subsequent arrests occurred in April 2025, with three more suspects detained in Barcelona and additional individuals are in custody in France and the United Kingdom. The components seized match those found in drones used by Hezbollah against Israel, highlighting the group's extensive international supply chain. The investigation underscores the challenges European security services face in disrupting such clandestine networks.

The dismantled network was involved in purchasing and exporting critical drone parts to Hezbollah in Lebanon. The components seized matched those found in drones launched by Hezbollah towards Israel, indicating a direct link between the European network and militant activities in the Middle East.

The successful operation involved collaboration among various European intelligence and law enforcement agencies, including Spain's Civil Guard, Germany's Federal Criminal Police Office (BKA), France's General Directorate for Internal Security (DGSI), and the United Kingdom's counterterrorism units. The coordinated efforts reflect a unified stance against the proliferation of terrorist networks and the illegal trafficking of military-grade components.

=== Switzerland ===
Citing Swiss neutrality, Switzerland does not regard Hezbollah as a terrorist organization. Its government only uses the Sanctions List provided by the United Nations.

In December 2024, the Swiss Federal Assembly voted to ban Hezbollah. Swiss government opposed the move and the motion to ban is still to be implemented by the government.

=== Cyprus ===
In a televised interview in June 2024, Nasrallah threatened to attack Cyprus if it allowed Israeli military access to Cypriot airports and bases.

== Attitude of Israel to Hezbollah ==
Dan Gillerman, the Israeli representative at UN, referred to Hezbollah as a "cancerous growth" that must be removed.

The Israeli Government considers the use of military force in Lebanon as a legitimate means of isolating Hezbollah.

== Relationship with other countries and organizations ==
Hezbollah has been accused of training Iraqi insurgents to attack U.S. troops during the Iraq War.

The British government has claimed that the Provisional Irish Republican Army had relations with Hezbollah and that the IRA provided the group with technology that was used against British forces in Iraq.

Morocco cut ties with Iran for supporting and giving aid to the Polisario Front through Hezbollah, via the Iranian embassy in Algeria.

Brazilian president Jair Bolsonaro considered designating Hezbollah as a terrorist organization, following Argentina and Paraguay as part of the Triple Frontier. In the region, members of the Hezbollah's Barakat clan maintain commercial relations with the criminal syndicate Primeiro Comando da Capital.

The United States has accused members of the Venezuelan government of providing financial aid to Hezbollah.

=== United States ===
The United States has designated Hezbollah as a terrorist organisation and sanctioned it. In December 2019, the US Treasury sanctioned individuals it claimed were Hezbollah financiers, and again, in May 2022, it announced sanctions on Ahmad Jalal Reda Abdallah, a Lebanese businessman and the Iranian-backed group's financial facilitator, as well as his companies.

=== Arab League ===
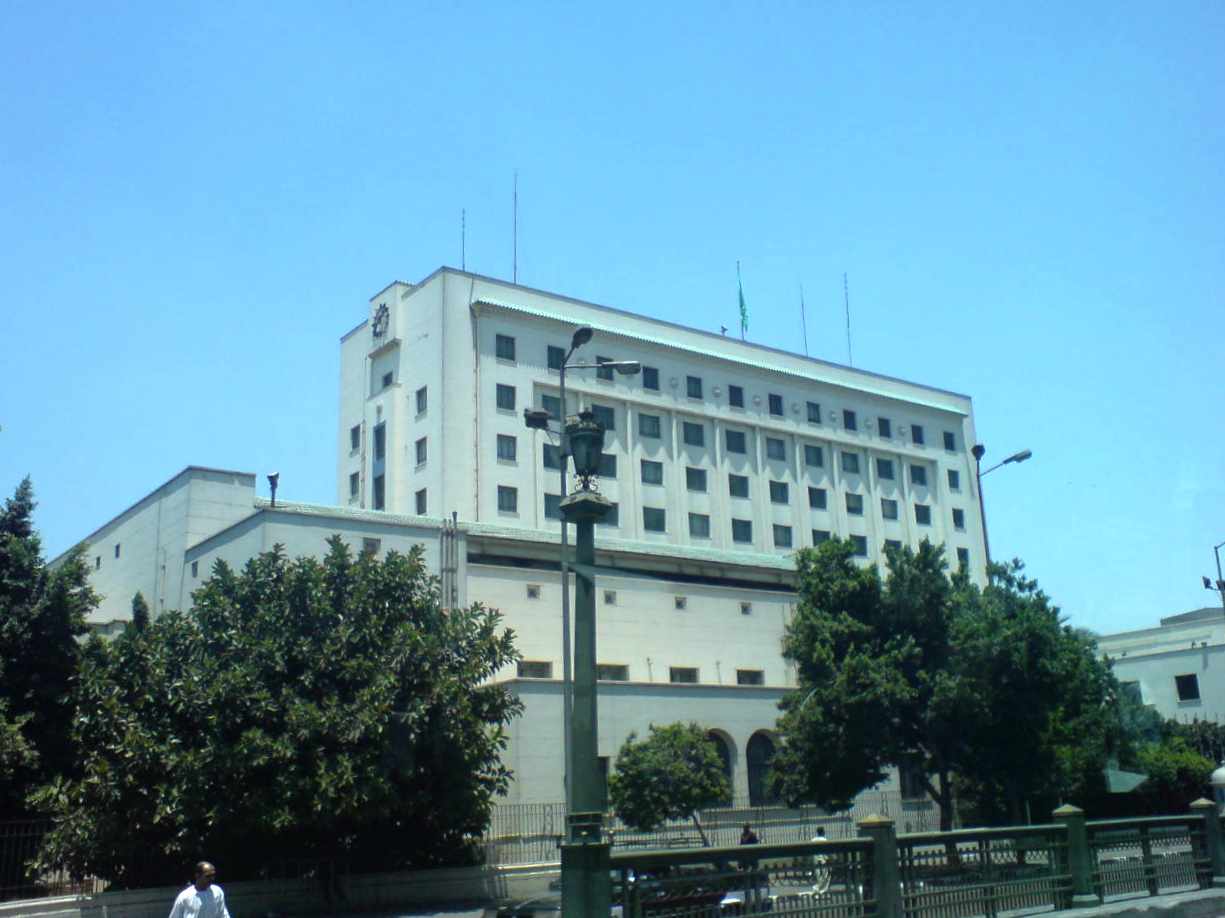
Headquarters of the Arab League, Cairo.

On 11 March 2016, the Arab League designated Hezbollah a terrorist organization during a meeting of Arab League foreign ministers at the organization's headquarters in Egypt's capital Cairo. Nearly all 22 Arab League members supported the decision, except Lebanon, Syria, Algeria and Iraq which expressed "reservations" about the decision. In June 2024, the Arab League's Deputy Secretary General Gossam Zaki announced they have ceased referring to Hezbollah as a 'terrorist organization'. He later added that his words were "interpreted out of context", while noting that the league "does not resort to labeling entities as terrorist organizations and does not adopt such lists."

=== Designation as a terrorist organization ===
The following entities have listed the entire organization Hezbollah as a terror group:

Argentina
Australia
Austria
Bahrain
Canada
Colombia
Czech Republic
Ecuador
Estonia
Germany
Gulf Cooperation Council
Guatemala
Honduras
Israel
Lithuania
Netherlands
New Zealand
Paraguay
Serbia
Slovenia
Switzerland
United Kingdom
United States

The following entities have listed only certain parts of Hezbollah as a terror group:

European Union	Hezbollah's military wing.
France	The military wing of Hezbollah only, France considers the political wing as a legitimate sociopolitical organization.
Kosovo	The military wing of Hezbollah.

The following entities that do not consider Hezbollah a terrorist organization:

Algeria	Algeria refused to designate Hezbollah as a terrorist organization.
Bulgaria	
China	China remains neutral and maintains contacts with Hezbollah.
Cote d'Ivoire	
Cyprus	
Cuba	Hezbollah allegedly operates a base in Cuba.
Egypt	
India	
Indonesia	Hezbollah's television broadcast from Indonesia with government permit.
Iran	Hezbollah and Iran are close allies.
Nicaragua	Allegedly supports Hezbollah.
North Korea	Allegedly supports Hezbollah. Considers Hezbollah an organization of Lebanese patriotic forces.
Qatar	Allegedly supports Hezbollah.
Russia	Allegedly supports Hezbollah. Considers Hezbollah a legitimate sociopolitical organization.
Sierra Leone	Hezbollah has a permanent liaison to the country.
Senegal	Hezbollah has officials in Senegal.
Thailand	
Venezuela	Allegedly allows Hezbollah to use the country for drug trafficking, a key source of income for the group.

Countries that neither designate Hezbollah as a terrorist organization nor support its activities:

Iraq	Iraqi Shiite militias have ties to Hezbollah, but the Federal government of Iraq has pressured them.
Syria	The Assad regime maintained close ties with Hezbollah, but after its overthrow, the current Syrian government clashed with it along the border.

== See also ==
- Ideology of Hezbollah
- Hezbollah political activities
- Hezbollah military activities
