= Mohamad Jawad Khalifeh =

Lebanese surgeon

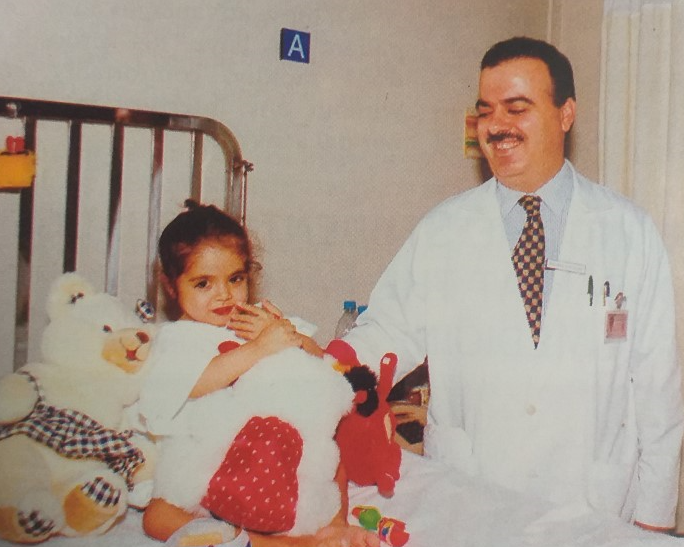
Khalife with a patient in 1998

Mohamed Jawad Khalife (born November 7, 1961) is a Lebanese surgeon. He was minister of Public Health of Lebanon from 2004 to 2010.

== Biography ==
Mohamed Jawad Khalife was born on November 7, 1961, in Sarafand, Lebanon.

He was the son of Jawad Khalife, former mayor of Sarafand.

After obtaining his medical qualifications (MD) from the University of Bucharest-Romania in 1985, he trained in surgery and obtained his specialty degree in general surgery from the American University of Beirut-Lebanon in 1991. He completed his fellowships in surgery between 1990-1998 in London hospitals (Watford, St. Thomas, King’s College, Royal Free Hospital) with special interest in vascular, cancer and liver transplantation surgery.

Back to Lebanon in 1991, he chaired the division of General Surgery and was appointed the Director of the Liver Transplant and Hepato-Pancreatico-Biliary Unit at the American University of Beirut Medical Center where he performed the first liver transplantation surgery in the region and pioneered many other major surgical techniques.

In the period between 2004-2010, Professor Khalifeh was named in five successive governments as the minister of Public Health of Lebanon. In addition to his public duties, Professor Khalifeh kept practicing surgeries at AUB-Medical Center, teaching students, training residents and producing research. Under his terms as Minister of Health, Lebanon launched a network of accredited primary health care centers in addition to opening over 20 public hospitals in the country, a new registry for quality and pricing of pharmaceuticals in Lebanon was created, a health reform plan that guarantees a mandatory public national health insurance system to every citizen was instituted, and the official National Cancer Registry (NCR) in Lebanon was launched.

== Awards ==
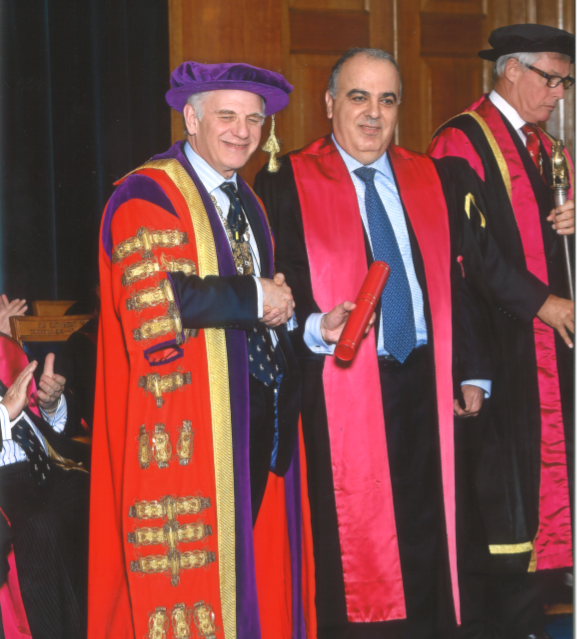
Mohamad Jawad Khalife (center)

- 2004: Officer of the National Order of the Cedar
- 2009: Commander of the National Order of the Cedar
- Honorary fellowships of the Royal College of Physicians and the Royal College of Surgeons in England
- 2021: Order of the Rockel (effectively making him Grand Commander of the order of the Republic of Sierra Leone)
