= Candidates of the 2022 Lebanese general election =

A total of 718 candidates contested the 2022 Lebanese general election, running on 103 lists.

== Electoral lists ==
- Bold : Elected in 2018 and running in 2022.
- ★ and Italic : Elected in 2022
- ~~Strikethrough~~: Withdrawn from list.

These lists were released by the Ministry of Interior.

=== Beirut 1 (East Beirut) – 8 seats ===
Name	Armenian Orthodox 3			Armenian Catholic 1	Maronite 1	Greek Orthodox 1	Greek Catholic 1	Minorities 1
Loubnan Al Seyada (Kataeb)	Annie Seferian	Talar Markosian	Leon Semergian	★**Jean Talozian**	★**Nadim Gemayel** (Kataeb)	Asma Andraos	Najib Lyan	Antoine Siryani
Kenna W Rah Nebaa (FPM – Tashnaq)	**Alexander Matossian** (Tashnaq)	★**Hagop Terzian** (Tashnaq)	George Govelkian	Serge Malkonian (Tashnaq)	Elie Aswad	Carla Boutros	★**Nicolas Sehnaoui** (FPM)	Chamoun Chamoun
Beirut, Nahno Laha (Lebanese Forces, Hunchak)	★**Jihad Pakradouni** (pro-Lebanese Forces)	Aram Malian (Hunchak)			George Chehwan	★**Ghassan Hasbani** (Lebanese Forces)	Fadi Nahhas	Elie Sharbashi (Lebanese Forces)
Liwatani	★**Paola Yacoubian** (Tahalof Watani)	Magui Nanijian (Tahalof Watani)	Diana Ohanian (Tahalof Watani)	Brigette Shalbian (Tahalof Watani)	Ziad Abi Chaker (Tahalof Watani)	Ziad Abs (ReLebanon)	Charles Fakhoury (ReLebanon)	★**Cynthia Zarazeer** (ReLebanon)
Kadreen (Citizens in a State)					Moussa Khoury (MMFD)	Mary Jreidini (MMFD)	Charbel Nahhas (MMFD)	Roy Ibrahim (MMFD)
Beirut Madinati	Levon Telvezian (Madinati)				Pierre Al Gemayel (Madinati)	Tarek Ammar (Madinati)	Nada Sehnaoui (Madinati)	Jacques Jendo (Madinati)

=== Beirut 2 (West Beirut) – 11 seats ===
Name	Sunni 6						Shia 2		Druze 1	Greek Orthodox 1	Evangelical 1
Beirut Al Taghyeer	Eman Tabbara (Endorsed by National Bloc)	★**Ibrahim Mnaimneh** (Mada-Beirut Tuqawem)	Fatima Mechref (Sabaa)	Samah Halwani (Mada-Beirut Tuqawem)	★**Wadah Sadek** (Ana Khatt Ahmar)	Rushdi Kabbani (Thuwar Beirut)	Ali Abbas (Popular Observatory)	Mahmoud Fakih (Tahalof Watani)	Hani Ahmadieh (Tahalof Watani)	★**Melhem Khalaf**	Nouhad Yazbek (Mada-Beirut Tuqawem)
Beirut Badda Alb (National Dialogue Party)	★**Fouad Makhzoumi** (National Dialogue Party)	Hasan Kechli	Kareem Shbaklo	Abdelatif Itani	Mazen Shbaro	Nabil Naja	Olfat Elsabaa	Lina Hamdan	Zeina Mounzer	Zeina Majdalani	Omar Al Dabghi
Haidi Beirut	★**Nabil Bader**	★**Imad Al Hout** (Jamaa Islamiyya)	Mahmoud Al Jamal (Ex-Future)	Yusra Al Tannir (Independent)	Marwan Salam (Ex-Future)	Nabil Itani (Independent)	Haidar Bazzi	Huda Assi	Wissam Abu Fakher	Khalil Brummana	Harouteon Kok Kozian
Beirut Touwajeh (PSP – Fouad Sanioura bloc)	Khaled Kabbani	Bachir Itani	Majed Dimashkieh	Zeina Al Masri	Lina Al Tannir	Abdalrahman Al Mobsher	Ahmad Ayash		★**Faisal El Sayegh** (PSP)	Michel Fallah	Georges Haddad
Wehdat Beirut (Hezbollah – FPM – Amal-SSNP)	Maha Shatila	Abdallah Matarji	Almoatassim Billah Faouzi Adham				★**Amine Sherri** (Hezbollah)	★**Mohammad Khawaja** (Amal)	Nassib Al Jaouhari (LDP)	Ramzi Maalouf (SSNP)	★**Edgar Traboulsi** (FPM)
Libeirut (Al Ahbash)	★**Adnan Traboulsi** (Al Ahbash)	Ahmad Dabbagh (Al Ahbash)	Mohammad Ardromli	Khaled Hankir	Walid Itani	Mohammad Al Arab	Jihad Hammoud		Eyad Al Banna		Mary Al Jalakh
Litabka Beirut (Bahaa Hariri bloc)	Ahmad Khaled	Mohammad Chehab	Eyad Merhi	Rasha Itani	Kholoud Al Wattar	Fouad Al Deek			Samir Al Halabi	Nicolas Saba (Sawa)	Dalal Rahbani
Kadreen (Citizens in a State)	Omar Sabra (MMFD)						Mohamad Nasser (MMFD)	Ali Shiran (MMFD)	Weam Dalal (MMFD)	Alexi Haddad (MMFD)	Hadi Al Hosni (MMFD)
Naam LiBeirut	Maya Shatila	Samer Yehya	Ayman Mohammad				Ali Fasai	Yassine Fawaz	Naeem Ayash		
~~Beirut Madinati~~	~~Sara Yassine~~ ~~(Madinati)~~	~~Faisal Al Tamrawi~~ ~~(Madinati)~~					~~Naheda Khalil~~ ~~(Madinati)~~		~~Rima Abu Shakra~~	~~Paola Rbeiz~~ ~~(Madinati)~~	~~Maha Al Rasi~~ ~~(Madinati)~~

=== Bekaa 1 (Zahle) – 7 seats ===
Name	Greek Catholic 2		Maronite 1	Greek Orthodox 1	Sunni 1	Shia 1	Armenian Orthodox 1
Seyadeyoon Moustakeloon	★**Michel Daher**		Samir Sader	Yousif Karaouni	Omar Halablab	Firas Abou Hamdan	Martine Demerjian
Zahle Al Seyada (Lebanese Forces)	★**George Okkais** (Lebanese Forces)	Sabine Al Kassouf	Michel Al Tannouri	★**Elias Estephan** (Lebanese Forces)	★**Bilal Al Hashimi** (Pro-Sanioura)	Dima Abou Dia	Pierre Demerjian
Zahle Tantafid	Jihad Al Tirk (Zahle Tantafid)			Eid Azar	Hamza Mita (Humat El Doustour)	Amer Al Sabouri	Armine Asfahani
Al Kaul Wa Al Fehl	Fouad Al Khoury		Imad Chamoun	Omar Maalouf	Samar Adham	Ali Mehdi	
Zahle Al Risala (FPM – Hezbollah)	Rabih Assi		★**Salim Aoun** (FPM)	Antoine Al Shakia	Hussein Saleh	★**Rami Abou Hamdan** (Hezbollah)	★**George Boshkian** (Tashnag)
Al Taghyeer	Khalil Younis		Tanos Al Khoury		Reda El Mais (Supported by Sawa)	Husein Al Khatib	Lina Kokjian
Kadreen Nouwajeh (Citizens in a State)	Petra Semaha (MMFD)	Rami Abou Eid (MMFD)	Ghassan Homaimes (Pro-MMFD)		Rania Al Mays (MMFD)		
Al Kitla Al Shaabeyya (Skaff bloc)	Myriam Skaff (Popular Bloc)		Maroun Makhoul (Popular Bloc)	Sami Nabhan (Popular Bloc)	Mohammad Hammoud (Popular Bloc)	Fawzat Dalloul (Popular Bloc)	Narik Ibrahimian (Popular Bloc)

=== Bekaa 2 (West Bekaa – Rashaya) – 6 seats ===
Name	Sunni 2		Shia 1	Maronite 1	Greek Orthodox 1	Druze 1
Al Ghad Al Afdal (Amal – FPM – Union Party – Hezbollah – Elie Ferzli bloc)	★**Hasan Mourad** (Union Party)		★**Kabalan Kabalan** (Amal)	★**Charbel Maroun** (FPM)	**Elie Ferzli**	Tarek Daoud (LASM)
Bekaaouna Awalan (Lebanese Forces)	~~Khaled Al Askar~~	~~Mohammad Kaddoura~~	Ghenwa Assaad	Dani Khater (Lebanese Forces)	George Abboud	
Laehat Sahlouna Wal Jabal	★**Yassine Yassine**		Hatem Al Kheshen	Maguy Aoun	Sally Chemieh	Bahaa Dalal
Al Karar Al Watani Al Moustakel (PSP – Ex Future – Jamaa Islamiyya)	**Mohammad Al Karaawi**	Ali Abou Yassine (Jamaa Islamiyya)	Abbas Eidi	Jihad Al Zarzour	★**Ghassan Skaff**	★**Wael Abou Faour** (PSP)
~~Nahwa Al Taghyeer~~ (Kataeb)	~~Alaa Al Chemali~~	~~Amer Kaddoura~~		~~Guitta Al Ojeil~~ (Kataeb)		~~Shawki Abou Ghoush~~
Kadreen (Citizens in a State)	Oussama Abou Zeid (MMFD)		Farah Kassem (MMFD)	Ghada Ghanem (MMFD)		Magge Mehanna (MMFD)

=== Bekaa 3 (Baalbek – Hermel) – 10 seats ===
Name	Shia 6						Sunni 2		Maronite 1	Greek Catholic 1
Al Amal Wa Al Wafaa (Hezbollah – Amal)	★**Husein Al Hajj Hasan** (Hezbollah)	★**Ghazi Zaiter** (Amal)	★**Ali Al Mokdad** (Hezbollah)	★**Ibrahim Al Mousaui** (Hezbollah)	★**Ihab Hamadeh** (Hezbollah)	★**Jamil Al Sayyed**	★**Melhem Al Hojairi**	★**Yanal Solh**	Akid Hadchiti	★**Samer Al Toum** (FPM)
Binaa Al Dawla (Lebanese Forces)	Abbas Al Jaouhari	~~Ramez Kamhaz~~	~~Refaad Al Masri~~	Husein Raad	~~Haiman Mcheik~~	Rachid Issa	Zeidan Al Hojairi	Saleh Al Shall	★**Antoine Habshi** (Lebanese Forces)	Elie Al Bitar (Lebanese Forces)
Ehtilaf Al Taghyeer	Abbas Yaghi	Alsharif Sleiman	Sami Al Toufaili	Oussama Shamas	Ali Abi Raad		Khaled Solh (Tahalof Watani)	Mohammad Al Hojairi	Youssif Al Fakhri (Sabaa)	Talal Al Makdissi
Kadreen (Citizens in a State)	Sara Zaiter (MMFD)	Mohammad Al Jebawi (MMFD)	Daher Amhaz (MMFD)							Michel Mehanna (MMFD)
Moustakeloon Dod Al Fasad	Hani Shamas	Imad Nassereddine	Hasan Mazloum	Hussein Darwich	Alsayyed Ahmad Shokor		Ali Abdelhamid	Ahmad Karnabi	Shawki Al Fakhri	Abdallah Aad
Laehat Al Ashaer wa Al Aaelat Lel Enmaa	Medhat Zaiter	Hasan Al Masri	Mohammad Othman	Shahrazad Hamieh			Mohammad Fleiti	Ali Al Moula		

=== Mount Lebanon 1 (Keserwan – Jbeil) – 8 seats ===
Name	Maronite (Jbeil) 2		Shia (Jbeil) 1	Maronite (Keserwan) 5				
Maakom Fina Lalaakher (Lebanese Forces)	★**Ziad Hawat** (Pro-Lebanese Forces)	Habib Barakat	Mahmoud Awad	★**Shauki Al Dakkache** (Lebanese Forces)	Antoine Sfeir (endorsed by NLP)	Karen Al Boustani	Shadi Fayyad	Joe Raidy
Alb Loubnan Al Moustakel (Chamel Roukoz + Farid El Khazen Bloc)	Emile Naufal	Toni Khairallah	Ahmad Al Mokdad	★**Farid Haykal Khazen**	**Chamel Roukoz**	Shaker Salama (Ex-Kataeb)	Salim Hani (Sawa)	Taufik Salloum (Ex-FPM)
Sarkhat Watan (Kataeb – National Bloc – Neemat Frem bloc)	Najwa Bassil	Naufal Naufal	Amir Al Mokdad	★**Neemat Frem**	★**Salim Al Sayegh** (Kataeb)	Julie Al Dakkache	Wajdi Tabet (National Bloc)	Josephine Zgheib (Ex-MMFD)
Alhorryia Karar (Mansour Al Bon bloc)	Fares Souaid	Asaad Reshdan	Mashhour Ahmad	Mansour Al Bon	Bahjat Salama	Moussa Zgheib		
Kenna w Rah Nebaa (FPM – Hezbollah)	★**Simon Abi Ramia** (FPM)	Walid Al Khouri (FPM)	★**Raed Berro** (Hezbollah)	★**Nada Al Boustani** (FPM)	Toni Al Kreidi	Rabih Zgheib	Wassim Salama	Imad Azar
Kadreen (Citizens in a State)	Dominik Tarabai (MMFD)		Farah Nasser (MMFD)	Charbel Freiha (Pro-MMFD)	Boutros Khalil (MMFD)			
Nehna Al Taghyeer	Ghassan Germanos	Rania Bassil (Sabaa)	Talal Mokdad	Zeina Al Kallab	Simon Sfeir			

=== Mount Lebanon 2 (Matn) – 8 seats ===
Name	Maronite 4				Greek Orthodox 2		Greek Catholic 1	Armenian Orthodox 1
Matn Al Horeyya (Lebanese Forces-NLP-Hunchak)	★**Razi El Hajj** (pro-Lebanese Forces)	Rashid Abou Jaoude (NLP)	Salim Al Jalakh	Farid Zeinoun	Hani Saliba (Yes! Lebanon)		★**Melhem Antoun Riachy** (Lebanese Forces)	Ara Bardakgian (Yes! Lebanon)
Matn El Taghyeer (Kataeb)	★**Sami Al Gemayel** (Kataeb)	★**Elias Hankash** (Kataeb)	Mona Succar	Simon Bou Fadel	Samir Saliba (Ana Khatt Ahmar)		Rima Njeim	Krikor Mardikian
Kenna w Rah Nebaa – Al Matn (FPM)	★**Ibrahim Kenaan** (FPM)	Nasri Lahhoud			★**Elias Bou Saab** (FPM)		**Edgard Maalouf** (FPM)	Ricardo Malikian (FPM)
Maan Akwa (Tashnaq – SSNP – Michel El Murr bloc)	Antoine Khalil (SSNP)	Randa Abboud	Maroun Abou Diwan	Maroun Rizkallah	★**Michel El Murr**	Joyce Jammal	Leah Bou Chaaya	★**Hagop Pakradonian** (Tashnag)
Matneyyoon Seyadeyyoon	Paul Nacouzi	Romanos Raad	Wael Sakr	Charbel Abou Jaoude (Tahalof Watani)	Shady Beshara		Alfred Reyyashi	Shant Sarafian
Nahwa Al Dawla (Citizens in a State)	Verena El Amil (Mada-Jil El Teghyir)	Jad Ghosn (Pro-MMFD)	Miriam Jabr (Pro-MMFD)		Shaden Maalouf (MMFD)		Lucien Bou Rjeili	

=== Mount Lebanon 3 (Baabda) – 6 seats ===
Name	Maronite 3			Shia 2		Druze 1
Baabda Al Seyada Wal Karar (Lebanese Forces – PSP – NLP)	★**Pierre Bou Assi** (Lebanese Forces)	★**Camille Dory Chamoun** (NLP)	Alexander Karam	Saad Slim	Said Alama	★**Hadi Abou Al Hosn** (PSP)
Baabda Al Taghyeer (National Bloc)	Michel Helou (National Bloc)	Robert Khalife	Ziad Akl (Tahalof Watani)	Wassef Al Harake (Popular Observatory)		Abir Naji (Lihaqqi)
Laehat Al Wifak Al Watani (Hezbollah – FPM – Amal)	★**Alain Aoun** (FPM)	Fadi Abou Rahhal (FPM)	Shadi Waked (Pro-FPM)	★**Ali Ammar** (Hezbollah)	★**Fadi Alame** (pro-Amal)	Farouq Al Awar (LDP)
Baabda Tantafid (Ex-FPM)	Khalil Al Helou	Jean Abi Younes	Naim Aoun (Ex-FPM)	Ramzi Kanj (Ex-FPM)		
Kadreen (Citizens in a State)	Rani Al Rajji (MMFD)			Mohammad Sakr (MMFD)	Ali Darouiche (MMFD)	
Maan Nastateh	Abdo Saadeh	Amal Abou Farhat	Patrick Abou Shakra	Bilal Alame	Youssif Al Shaabine	Fadi Al Awar
Nehna Al Taghyeer	Pierre Baaklini	Michel Chamoun				Oussama Al Awar

=== Mount Lebanon 4 (Aley – Chouf) – 13 seats ===
Name
Maronite

5

Druze

4

Sunni

2

Greek Catholic

1

Greek Orthodox

1

**Chouf – 8 seats**

Name	Maronite 3			Druze 2		Sunni 2		Greek Catholic 1	Greek Orthodox 0
Al Sharaka wa Al Irada (PSP – Lebanese Forces - NLP)	★**Georges Adwan** (Lebanese Forces)	Habouba Aoun (Pro-PSP)	Elie Kerdahi (Pro-Lebanese Forces)	★**Taymour Joumblatt** (PSP)	★**Marwan Hamadeh** (Democratic Gathering)	★**Bilal Abdallah** (PSP)	Saadaldine Al Khatib (Pro-Sanioura)	Fadi Maalouf (NLP)	–
Tawahadna Lel Taghyeer	Ghada Eid	★**Najat Aoun Saliba** (Taqaddom)	Sououd Abou Chebel (Ex-Lebanese Forces)	Rania Ghayth		★**Halime Kaakour** (Lana)	Imad Seifeddine (endorsed by LCP)	Shukri Haddad	–
Kadreen (Citizens in a State)	Joseph Tohme (MMFD)			Aiman Zeineddine (MMFD)		Khaled Saad (MMFD)	Imad Al Farran (MMFD)		–
Seyadat Watan (Jamaa Islamiya)	Daad Azzi (Ex-NLP)	Joyce Maroun	George Selwan	Hisham Zebian		Mohammad Al Shamaa (Jamaa Islamiyya)	Maamoun Malak		–
Sawtak Thawra	Michel Abou Sleiman	Jamal Merhej	Gabi Azzi	Jihad Zebian	~~Modad Abou Ali~~	Samir Akkoum	Mohamad Sami Hajjar		–
Al Jabal Yantafid	Nabil Mchantaf	Abdallah Abou Abdallah		Zeina Mansour	Akram Breish				–
Laehat Al Jabal (FPM – LDP – Arab Unification Party)	Naji Al Boustani	★**Farid Al Boustani** (Pro-FPM)	Antoine Abboud	Wiam Wahhab (Arab Unification Party)		Ahmad Najmaldeen (Al Ahbash)	Oussama Al Maoush	★**Ghassan Atallah** (FPM)	–

**Aley – 5 seats**

Name	Maronite 2		Druze 2		Sunni 0	Greek Catholic 0	Greek Orthodox 1
Al Sharaka wa Al Irada (PSP – Lebanese Forces)	★**Raji Al Saad** (Democratic Gathering)	Joelle Faddoul (Pro-Lebanese Forces)	★**Akram Chehayyeb** (PSP)		–	–	★**Nazih Matta** (Lebanese Forces)
Tawahadna Lel Taghyeer	Fadi Abi Allam	Jad Bejjani	★**Mark Daou** (Taqaddom)	Alaa El Sayegh	–	–	Zoya Jreidini (endorsed by LCP)
Kadreen (Citizens in a State)			Nagham Al Halabi (MMFD)	Marwan Imad (MMFD)	–	–	
Seyadat Watan	Nabil Yazbek	Walid Chahine	~~Atallah Wehbi~~		–	–	
Sawtak Thawra	Imad Hage		Wassim Haidar	Raed Abdel Khalek	–	–	
Al Jabal Yantafid	Tabet Tabet		Mohsen Al Aridi	~~Salman Abdelkhalek~~	–	–	Leon Siufi
Laehat Al Jabal (FPM – LDP – Arab Unification Party)	★**Cesar Abi Khalil** (FPM)	Antoine Al Boustani	**Talal Arslan** (LDP)		–	–	Tarek Khairallah

=== North 1 (Akkar) – 7 seats ===
Name	Sunni 3			Greek Orthodox 2		Maronite 1	Alawite 1
Laehat Al Ihtidal Al Watani (Ex-Future)	★**Walid Al Baarini**	★**Mohammad Sleiman**	Ibrahim Al Masawmai (Independent)	★**Sajeeh Ateya**	Julie Hanna (Independent)	**Hadi Hobeish** (Ex-Future)	★**Ahmad Rustom**
Akkar (Lebanese Forces)	Talal Al Merhebi	Khaled Al Daher	Mohammad Ibrahim	Wissam Mansour (pro-Lebanese Forces)	Ziad Rahhal	Michel Al Khoury	Fawaz Mohammad
Al Wafaa Li Akkar (Supported by Azm)	Ali Tlais	Haitham Ezzedine	Ammar Rasheed	Elie Saad	Elie Deeb	Joseph Mikhael	Ahmad Al Hadam
Akkar Awalan (FPM-SSNP)	★**Mohammad Yehya**	Karam Al Daher	Hatem Saadaldine	★**Assaad Dergham** (FPM)	Shakeeb Abboud (SSNP)	★**Jimmy Jabbour** (FPM)	Haidar Issa
Nahwa Al Muwatana (Citizens in a State – LCP)	Roula Al Mourad (Independent)	Ahmad Moustapha (LCP)	Ghaith Hammoud (endorsed by LCP)	Michel Taaoum (LCP)	Nazih Ibrahim (MMFD)	Ralph Daher (MMFD)	
Akkar Al Taghyeer	Mohammad Badra	Berri Al Assaad	Khaled Alloush	Lloris El Rahi	Wafaa Gemayel	Edgard Daher	Jinan Hamdan
Akkar Tantafid	Abdelrazzak Al Kilani	Khaled Al Daher	~~Mohammad Mousilmani~~			Reine Sawane	~~Nizar Ibrahim~~
Al Nohoud Li Akkar	Wassim Al Merhebi (Supported by Sawa)	Saadallah Al Hamad	Mahmoud Hadarah	Hicham Chbib	Nafez Warrak	Tanios Al Khoury	Mohsen Hussein

=== North 2 (Tripoli – Dennieh – Minnieh) – 11 seats ===
Name	Sunni – Tripoli 5					Maronite – Tripoli 1	Greek Orthodox – Tripoli 1	Alawite – Tripoli 1	Sunni – Dennieh 2		Sunni – Mennieh 1
Al Irada Al Shaabiya (Dignity Movement)	★**Faisal Karami** (Dignity Movement)	★**Taha Naji** (Al-Ahbash)	Ahmad Al Amine	Rami Assoum (Ex-MMFD)	Ali Nour (Independent)	George Shabtini (Independent)	Rafli Diab (Marada)	Mohammad Al Traboulsi (Dignity Movement)	★**Jihad Al Samad**		Nabras Alamuddin
Inkaz Watan (Lebanese Forces – Ashraf Rifi bloc)	★**Ashraf Rifi**	Amin Bashir	Iman Darneikah	Saleh Al Mokaddam	Fawzi El Ferri	★**Elias Al Khoury** (Lebanese Forces)	★**Jamil Abboud** (Pro-Frem)	Mohammad Shamsine	Bilal Harmoush	Ahmed Al Karmeh	**Othman Alameddine**
Loubnan Lana (Ex-Future)	Moustapha Alloush (Ex-Future)	Fahed Moukaddam	Rouba Al Dalati (Ex-Future)	Ali Al Ayoubi (Independent)	Khaled Merhi (Independent)	Toni Chahine	Shiban Haykal	Bader Eid (Independent)	**Sami Fatfat** (Ex-Future)	★**Abdelaziz Al Samad**	★**Ahmad Al Kheir**
Lel Nas (Azm – PSP)	★**Abdelkarim Kabbara**	Elissar Yasan	Wahib Tatar	Jalal Al Bakkar	Afraa Eid (PSP)	Sleiman Obeid (Azm)	Cesar Khallat	**Ali Darwich** (Azm)	Baraa Harmoush	Ali Abdelaziz	Kazem Al Kheir
Intafid.. Lil Seyada Lil Adalah	Rami Fanj	Moustapha Al Owayek	Hind Al Soufi	Zakaria Mseikeh	Malik Moulawi (Sabaa)	Kamil Mourani (National Bloc)		★**Haidar Nasser**	Ghaleb Othman		Mohammad Khalil
Al Taghyeer Al Hakiki (Aljamea Alislameyya)	★**Ihab Mattar**	Azzam Ayoubi (Jamaa Islamiyya)	Farah Haddad	Ahmad Al Marj	Zein Moustapha	Paul Al Hamod	Moutanios Mahfoud	Firas Al Salloum	Mahmoud Al Sayyed (Jamaa Islamiyya)	Samir Taleb	Mohammad Dahabi
Al Jomhoureyya Al Thaletha	Omar Harfoush	Douha Ahmad	Diala Al Osta	Abdelraheem Dergham		Jeanette Frangieh	Alfred Dourah	Ahmad Ali	Nazih Zoud		Mohammad Zreik
Al Istikrar Wa Al Inmaa	Bassel Al Osta (Supported by Sawa)	Mayez Al Jundi	Younis Al Hasan	Dima Dennaoui	Sawsan Kasha	Michel Al Khoury		Saleh Al Deeb	Abdelkader Al Chami	Kamel Bakkour	Fadi Al Kheir (Supported by Sawa)
Kadreen (Citizens in a State)	Obeidah Tekriti (MMFD)	Mousbah Rajab (MMFD)					Mounir Doumani (MMFD)	Nidal Abdelrahman (MMFD)	Shafic Hassoun (MMFD)		Mohammad Zreikah (MMFD)
Tomouh Ah Shabab	Adnan Bakkour	Moustapha Husein	Mahmoud Al Mir						Raed Al Tabbaa		Omar Al Masri
Fajr El Taghyeer	Bilal Chaaban	Abdelaziz Tartousi	Rabih El Sebaai			Anthony Eid		Hicham Ibrahim	Mohammad Alameddine	~~Mohammad Jabara~~	

=== North 3 (Bcharre – Zgharta – Koura – Batroun) – 10 seats ===
Name	Maronite – Zgharta 3			Maronite – Batroun 2		Maronite – Bcharre 2		Greek Orthodox – Koura 3		
Shamalouna	Shaden Al Daeef (Osos)	Gistelle Semaan (National Bloc)	★**Michel El Douaihy** (Osos)	Layal Bou Moussa	Rabih Al Shaer	Riad Tawk	Kozhaya Sassine	Semaan Al Bashwati	Jihad Farah (Aamieh 17 October)	Fadwa Nassif
Nabad Al Jomhoureyya Al Kaweyya (Lebanese Forces)	Mikhael El Douaihy (Pro-Lebanese Forces)	Maggie Toubia	Fouad Boulos	★**Ghayyath Yazbik** (Lebanese Forces)	Layal Nehmeh	★**Sethrida Taouk** (Lebanese Forces)	**Joseph Ishaak** (Lebanese Forces)	★**Fadi Karam** (Lebanese Forces)	Sami Rihana	Rami Salloum
Shamal Al Mouwajaha (Kataeb – Independence Movement)	★**Michel Mouawad** (Independence Movement)	Jawad Boulos (Independence Movement)	Tony Al Mardini	Majd Harb	Joelle Hoayek	Rashid Rahme (Kataeb)		★**Adib Abdelmassih**	Emile Fayyad	Brigette Kheir
Laehat Wehdat Al Shimal (SSNP (Hardan faction) – Marada)	**Estfan El Douaihy** (Marada)	★**Tony Frangieh** (Marada)	Carol Dahdah (Marada)	Joseph Najm (Marada)		★**Melhem Tawk**	Roy Al Khoury	**Salim Saadeh** (SSNP)	Fadi Ghosn (Marada)	
Rah Nebaa Hon (FPM – SSNP (Banat faction))	Pierre Raffoul (FPM)			★**Gebran Bassil** (FPM)	Walid Harb	Tony Matta (FPM)		★**George Atallah** (FPM)	Walid Al Azar (SSNP)	Ghassan karam (FPM)
Kadreen Nghayyer (Citizens in a State – LCP)	Maroun Mahfoud (MMFD)			Jean Kheirallah (MMFD)		Mery-Joe Matar (MMFD)		Anis Nehmeh (LCP)	Bassem Sneige (MMFD)	Zeina Al Nabti (MMFD)
Waai Sawtak	Antoine Yammine			Mirna Hanna		George Boutros		Bassam Ghantous	Moussa Louka	

=== South 1 (Saida – Jezzine) – 5 seats ===
Name	Sunni – Saida 2		Maronite – Jezzine 2		Greek Catholic – Jezzine 1
Al Ihtidal Kouwatuna (Amal)	Nabil Zaatari		**Ibrahim Azar** (Pro-Amal)		Yousif Skaff
Nantakheb Lil Taghyeer (Popular Nasserist Organization)	★**Oussama Saad Al Masri** (PNO)	★**Abdelrahman Al Bizri**	★**Charbel Masaad**	Kamil Serhal	Jamil Dagher
Nahnu Al Taghyeer	Hania Al Zaatari (Beirut Madinati)	Mohammad Al Zarif	Joseph Al Asmar	Sleiman Al Malek	Robert Al Khoury
Wahdatna Fi Saida wa Jezzine (Pro-Sanioura – Lebanese Forces)	Yousif Al Nakeeb (Pro-Sanioura)		★**Said Al Asmar** (Lebanese Forces)	Wissam Al Tawil	★**Ghada Ayoub** (pro-Lebanese Forces)
Sawt Al Taghyeer	Rana Al Tawil (Supported by Sawa)	Mohammad Al Tahera			Joseph Metri
Kadreen (Citizens in a State)	Ahmad Al Assi (MMFD)	Ismael Hafooda	Elie Abou Tas (MMFD)	Emilio Mattar (MMFD)	
Maan Li Saida Wa Jezzine (FPM)	Mohammad Al Kawas	Ali Al Sheikh Ammar	**Ziad Aswad** (FPM)	Amal Abou Zeid (FPM)	**Salim Al Khoury** (FPM)

=== South 2 (Tyre – Zahrani) – 7 seats ===
Name	Shia – Tyre 4				Shia – Zahrani 2		Greek Catholic – Zahrani 1
Al Amal Wal Wafaa (Hezbollah – Amal)	★**Hasan Ezzedine** (Hezbollah)	★**Ali Khreis** (Amal)	★**Husein Jeshi** (Hezbollah)	★**Inaya Ezzedine** (Amal)	★**Nabih Berri** (Amal)	★**Ali Osseiran** (pro-Amal)	★**Michel Moussa** (pro-Amal)
Al Dawla Al Hadina	Hasan Khalil	Bushra Khalil			Riad Al Assaad	Youssef Khalifeh	
Al Karar Al Horr (Lebanese Forces)	Kassem Daoud	Daoud Faraj					Robert Kanaan (Lebanese Forces)
Maan Lil Taghyeer (LCP-MMFD)	Hatem Halawi	Sara Soueidan	Mohammad Ayoub	Roaa Al Fares (MMFD)	Ali Khalifeh (Mada)	Aiman Mrouweh (LCP)	Hisham Hayek

=== South 3 (Nabatieh – Bint Jbeil – Hasbaya – Marjaayoun) – 11 seats ===
Name	Shia – Nabatieh 3			Shia – Bint Jbeil 3			Shia – Marjaayoun + Hasbaya 2		Sunni – Marjaayoun + Hasbaya 1	Druze – Marjaayoun + Hasbaya 1	Greek Orthodox – - Marjaayoun + Hasbaya 1
Al Amal Wal Wafaa (Hezbollah – Amal – SSNP)	★**Mohammad Raad** (Hezbollah)	★**Hani Kobeissi** (Amal)	★**Nasser Jaber** (Amal)	★**Hasan Fadlallah** (Hezbollah)	★**Ayoub Hmayid** (Amal)	★**Ashraf Baydoun** (Amal)	★**Ali Hasan Khalil** (Amal)	★**Ali Fayyad** (Hezbollah)	★**Kassem Hachem** (Baathist pro-Amal)	Marwan Kheireddine (LDP)	**Assad Herdan** (SSNP)
~~Sawt Al Janoub~~	~~Mahmoud Shaib~~			~~Husein Al Shaer~~			~~Abbas Sharafeddine~~		~~Riad Issa~~	~~Karim Hamdan~~	
Maan Nahwa Al Taghyeer (LCP)	Ali Wehbi	Wassim Ghandour (Beirut Madinati)	Wafik Rihan (endorsed by LCP)	Hasan Bazzi	Khalil Dib (LCP)	Ali Mrad (Aamieh 17 October)	Ibrahim Abdallah	Nizar Rammal (MMFD)	Mohammad Kaadan	★**Firas Hamdan**	★**Elias Jaradeh** (Al-Tali'a endorsed by LCP)

=== Result by candidate ===
Name	Electoral district	Sect	List	Party	Votes	% of electoral district	% of preferential votes for sect seat in minor district	% of list	Elected?	Gender
Moussa Khoury	Beirut 1	MA	Qadreen	MMFD	91					
Mary Jreidini	Beirut 1	GO	Qadreen	MMFD	56					Venus symbol
Charbel Nahhas	Beirut 1	GC	Qadreen	MMFD	1265					
Roy Ibrahim	Beirut 1	MI	Qadreen	MMFD	39					
Hagop Terzian	Beirut 1	AO	Kenna W Rah Nebaa	Tashnaq	2647				Yes	
Alexander Matossian	Beirut 1	AO	Kenna W Rah Nebaa	Tashnaq	2216					
George Govelkian	Beirut 1	AO	Kenna W Rah Nebaa		286					
Serge Malkonian	Beirut 1	AC	Kenna W Rah Nebaa		95					
Elie Aswad	Beirut 1	MA	Kenna W Rah Nebaa		303					
Carla Boutros	Beirut 1	RO	Kenna W Rah Nebaa		137					Venus symbol
Nicolas Sehnaoui	Beirut 1	RC	Kenna W Rah Nebaa	FPM	4781				Yes	
Chamoun Chamoun	Beirut 1	MI	Kenna W Rah Nebaa		230					
Annie Seferian	Beirut 1	AO	Loubnan Al Seyada		277					Venus symbol
Leon Semergian	Beirut 1	AO	Loubnan Al Seyada		208					
Talar Markosian	Beirut 1	AO	Loubnan Al Seyada		43					Venus symbol
Jean Talozian	Beirut 1	AC	Loubnan Al Seyada		4043				Yes	
Nadim Gemayel	Beirut 1	MA	Loubnan Al Seyada	Kataeb	4425				Yes	
Asma Andraos	Beirut 1	GO	Loubnan Al Seyada		917					Venus symbol
Najib Lyan	Beirut 1	GC	Loubnan Al Seyada		391					
Antoine Siryani	Beirut 1	MI	Loubnan Al Seyada		558					
Magui Nanijian	Beirut 1	AO	Liwatani	Tahalof Watani	80					Venus symbol
Diana Ohanian	Beirut 1	AO	Liwatani	Tahalof Watani	63					Venus symbol
Paola Yacoubian	Beirut 1	AO	Liwatani	Tahalof Watani	3524				Yes	Venus symbol
Brigette Shalbian	Beirut 1	AC	Liwatani	Tahalof Watani	129					Venus symbol
Ziad Abi Chaker	Beirut 1	MA	Liwatani	Tahalof Watani	3142					
Ziad Abs	Beirut 1	GO	Liwatani	ReLebanon	514					
Charles Fakhoury	Beirut 1	GC	Liwatani	ReLebanon	64					
Cynthia Zarazeer	Beirut 1	MI	Liwatani	ReLebanon	486				Yes	Venus symbol
Levon Telvezian	Beirut 1	AO	Beirut Madinati	Madinati	125					
Pierre Al Gemayel	Beirut 1	MA	Beirut Madinati	Madinati	160					
Tarek Ammar	Beirut 1	GO	Beirut Madinati	Madinati	158					
Nada Sehnaoui	Beirut 1	RC	Beirut Madinati	Madinati	362					Venus symbol
Jacques Jendo	Beirut 1	MI	Beirut Madinati	Madinati	226					
Aram Malian	Beirut 1	AO	Beirut, Nahno Laha	Hunchak	1068					
Jihad Pakradouni	Beirut 1	AO	Beirut, Nahno Laha		2186				Yes	
George Chehwan	Beirut 1	MA	Beirut, Nahno Laha		1684					
Ghassan Hasbani	Beirut 1	GO	Beirut, Nahno Laha	Lebanese Forces	7080				Yes	
Fadi Nahhas	Beirut 1	GC	Beirut, Nahno Laha		200					
Elie Sharbashi	Beirut 1	MI	Beirut, Nahno Laha	Lebanese Forces	727					
Samah Halwani	Beirut 2	SU	Beirut Al Taghyeer	Beirut Tuqawem	235					Venus symbol
Fatima Mechref	Beirut 2	SU	Beirut Al Taghyeer	Sabaa	307					Venus symbol
Ibrahim Mnaimneh	Beirut 2	SU	Beirut Al Taghyeer	Beirut Tuqawem	13281				Yes	
Eman Tabbara	Beirut 2	SU	Beirut Al Taghyeer	National Bloc	1944					Venus symbol
Wadah Sadek	Beirut 2	SU	Beirut Al Taghyeer	Ana Khatt Ahmar	3760				Yes	
Rushdi Kabbani	Beirut 2	SU	Beirut Al Taghyeer		485					
Mahmoud Fakih	Beirut 2	SH	Beirut Al Taghyeer	Tahalof Watani	534					
Ali Abbas	Beirut 2	SH	Beirut Al Taghyeer	Popular Observatory	803					
Hani Ahmadieh	Beirut 2	DR	Beirut Al Taghyeer	Tahalof Watani	153					
Melhem Khalaf	Beirut 2	GO	Beirut Al Taghyeer		7141				Yes	
Nouhad Yazbek	Beirut 2	EV	Beirut Al Taghyeer	Beirut Tuqawem	3272					Venus symbol
Mazen Shbaro	Beirut 2	SU	Beirut Badda Alb		766					
Hasan Kechli	Beirut 2	SU	Beirut Badda Alb		885					
Nabil Naja	Beirut 2	SU	Beirut Badda Alb		526					
Kareem Shbaklo	Beirut 2	SU	Beirut Badda Alb		470					
Abdelatif Itani	Beirut 2	SU	Beirut Badda Alb		1531					
Fouad Makhzoumi	Beirut 2	SU	Beirut Badda Alb	NDP	10021				Yes	
Olfat Elsabaa	Beirut 2	SH	Beirut Badda Alb		181					Venus symbol
Lina Hamdan	Beirut 2	SH	Beirut Badda Alb		227					Venus symbol
Zeina Mounzer	Beirut 2	DR	Beirut Badda Alb		308					Venus symbol
Zeina Majdalani	Beirut 2	GO	Beirut Badda Alb		1462					Venus symbol
Omar Al Dabghi	Beirut 2	EV	Beirut Badda Alb		1403					
Majed Dimashkieh	Beirut 2	SU	Beirut Touwajeh		977					
Lina Al Tannir	Beirut 2	SU	Beirut Touwajeh		2273					Venus symbol
Abdalrahman Al Mobsher	Beirut 2	SU	Beirut Touwajeh		1355					
Zeina Al Masri	Beirut 2	SU	Beirut Touwajeh		1500					Venus symbol
Bachir Itani	Beirut 2	SU	Beirut Touwajeh		1692					
Khaled Kabbani	Beirut 2	SU	Beirut Touwajeh		3433					
Ahmad Ayash	Beirut 2	SH	Beirut Touwajeh		241					
Faisal El Sayegh	Beirut 2	DR	Beirut Touwajeh	PSP	2565				Yes	
Michel Fallah	Beirut 2	GO	Beirut Touwajeh		2950					
Georges Haddad	Beirut 2	EV	Beirut Touwajeh		453					
Sara Yassine	Beirut 2	SU	Beirut Madinati	Madinati	84					Venus symbol
Faisal Al Tamrawi	Beirut 2	SU	Beirut Madinati	Madinati	25					
Naheda Khalil	Beirut 2	SH	Beirut Madinati	Madinati	66					Venus symbol
Rima Abu Shakra	Beirut 2	DR	Beirut Madinati		15					Venus symbol
Paola Rbeiz	Beirut 2	GO	Beirut Madinati	Madinati	97					Venus symbol
Maha Al Rasi	Beirut 2	EV	Beirut Madinati	Madinati	12					Venus symbol
Omar Sabra	Beirut 2	SU	Qadreen	MMFD	791					
Ali Shiran	Beirut 2	SH	Qadreen	MMFD	91					
Mohamad Nasser	Beirut 2	SH	Qadreen	MMFD	81					
Weam Dalal	Beirut 2	DR	Qadreen	MMFD	38					
Alexi Haddad	Beirut 2	GO	Qadreen	MMFD	612					
Hadi Al Hosni	Beirut 2	EV	Qadreen	MMFD	72					
Walid Itani	Beirut 2	SU	Libeirut		53					
Khaled Hankir	Beirut 2	SU	Libeirut		35					
Ahmad Dabbagh	Beirut 2	SU	Libeirut		5837					
Mohammad Ardromli	Beirut 2	SU	Libeirut		55					
Adnan Traboulsi	Beirut 2	SU	Libeirut		8463				Yes	
Mohammad Al Arab	Beirut 2	SU	Libeirut		124					
Jihad Hammoud	Beirut 2	SH	Libeirut		38					
Eyad Al Banna	Beirut 2	DR	Libeirut		3					
Mary Al Jalakh	Beirut 2	EV	Libeirut		18					Venus symbol
Eyad Merhi	Beirut 2	SU	Litabka Beirut		58					
Kholoud Al Wattar	Beirut 2	SU	Litabka Beirut		166					Venus symbol
Rasha Itani	Beirut 2	SU	Litabka Beirut		194					Venus symbol
Mohamad Chehab	Beirut 2	SU	Litabka Beirut		907					
Fouad Al Deek	Beirut 2	SU	Litabka Beirut		447					
Ahmad Khaled	Beirut 2	SU	Litabka Beirut		161					
Samir Al Halabi	Beirut 2	DR	Litabka Beirut		28					
Nicolas Saba	Beirut 2	GO	Litabka Beirut		249					
Dalal Rahbani	Beirut 2	EV	Litabka Beirut		49					Venus symbol
Ayman Mohammad	Beirut 2	SU	Naam LiBeirut		53					
Maya Shatila	Beirut 2	SU	Naam LiBeirut		31					Venus symbol
Samer Yehya	Beirut 2	SU	Naam LiBeirut		8					
Ali Fasai	Beirut 2	SH	Naam LiBeirut		13					
Yassine Fawaz	Beirut 2	SH	Naam LiBeirut		111					
Naeem Ayash	Beirut 2	DR	Naam LiBeirut		10					
Nabil Itani	Beirut 2	SU	Haidi Beirut		544					
Mahmoud Al Jamal	Beirut 2	SU	Haidi Beirut		3502					
Marwan Salam	Beirut 2	SU	Haidi Beirut		680					
Imad Al Hout	Beirut 2	SU	Haidi Beirut		7362				Yes	
Yusra Al Tannir	Beirut 2	SU	Haidi Beirut		600					Venus symbol
Mohammad Bader	Beirut 2	SU	Haidi Beirut		5631				Yes	
Haidar Bazzi	Beirut 2	SH	Haidi Beirut		422					
Huda Assi	Beirut 2	SH	Haidi Beirut		115					Venus symbol
Wissam Abu Fakher	Beirut 2	DR	Haidi Beirut		92					
Khalil Brummana	Beirut 2	GO	Haidi Beirut		636					
Haroteon Kozian	Beirut 2	EV	Haidi Beirut		206					
Maha Shatila	Beirut 2	SU	Wehdat Beirut		248					Venus symbol
Almoatassim Billah Faouzi Adham	Beirut 2	SU	Wehdat Beirut		367					
Abdallah Matarji	Beirut 2	SU	Wehdat Beirut		375					
Mohammad Khawaja	Beirut 2	SH	Wehdat Beirut	Amal	5789				Yes	
Amine Sherri	Beirut 2	SH	Wehdat Beirut	Hezbollah	26363				Yes	
Nassib Al Jaohari	Beirut 2	DR	Wehdat Beirut	LDP	226					
Ramzi Maalouf	Beirut 2	GO	Wehdat Beirut	SSNP	745					
Edgar Traboulsi	Beirut 2	EV	Wehdat Beirut	FPM	2053				Yes	
Khalil Younis	Bekaa 1	GC	Al Taghyeer		99					
Tanos Al Khoury	Bekaa 1	MA	Al Taghyeer		32					
Reda El Mais	Bekaa 1	SU	Al Taghyeer		1142					
Husein Al Khatib	Bekaa 1	SH	Al Taghyeer		13					
Lina Kokjian	Bekaa 1	AO	Al Taghyeer		102					Venus symbol
Fouad Al Khoury	Bekaa 1	GC	Al Kaul Wa Al Fehl		100					
Imad Chamoun	Bekaa 1	MA	Al Kaul Wa Al Fehl		31					
Omar Maalouf	Bekaa 1	GO	Al Kaul Wa Al Fehl		50					
Samar Adham	Bekaa 1	SU	Al Kaul Wa Al Fehl		53					Venus symbol
Ali Mehdi	Bekaa 1	SH	Al Kaul Wa Al Fehl		72					
Myriam Skaff	Bekaa 1	GC	Al Kitla Al Shaabeyya	Popular Bloc	4825					Venus symbol
Maroun Makhoul	Bekaa 1	MA	Al Kitla Al Shaabeyya	Popular Bloc	317					
Sami Nabhan	Bekaa 1	GO	Al Kitla Al Shaabeyya	Popular Bloc	274					
Mohammad Hammoud	Bekaa 1	SU	Al Kitla Al Shaabeyya	Popular Bloc	5869					
Fawzat Dalloul	Bekaa 1	SH	Al Kitla Al Shaabeyya	Popular Bloc	83					
Narik Ibrahimian	Bekaa 1	AO	Al Kitla Al Shaabeyya	Popular Bloc	133					
Rabih Assi	Bekaa 1	GC	Zahle Al Risala	FPM	148					
Salim Aoun	Bekaa 1	MA	Zahle Al Risala	FPM	5554				Yes	
Antoine Al Shakia	Bekaa 1	GO	Zahle Al Risala		105					
Hussein Saleh	Bekaa 1	SU	Zahle Al Risala		2465					
Rami Abou Hamdan	Bekaa 1	SH	Zahle Al Risala	Hezbollah	16539				Yes	
George Boshkian	Bekaa 1	AO	Zahle Al Risala	Tashnaq	2568				Yes	
George Okkais	Bekaa 1	GC	Zahle Al Seyada	Lebanese Forces	11921				Yes	
Sabine Al Kassouf	Bekaa 1	GC	Zahle Al Seyada		213					Venus symbol
Michel Al Tannouri	Bekaa 1	MA	Zahle Al Seyada		1794					
Elias Estephan	Bekaa 1	GO	Zahle Al Seyada	Lebanese Forces	6758				Yes	
Bilal Al Hashimi	Bekaa 1	SU	Zahle Al Seyada		3865				Yes	
Dima Abou Dia	Bekaa 1	SH	Zahle Al Seyada		225					Venus symbol
Pierre Demerjian	Bekaa 1	AO	Zahle Al Seyada		264					
Jihad Al Tirk	Bekaa 1	GC	Zahle Tantafid		258					
Eid Azar	Bekaa 1	GO	Zahle Tantafid		4516					
Hamza Mita	Bekaa 1	SU	Zahle Tantafid		2387					
Amer Al Sabouri	Bekaa 1	SH	Zahle Tantafid		259					
Armine Asfahani	Bekaa 1	AO	Zahle Tantafid		108					
Michel Daher	Bekaa 1	GC	Seyadeyoon Moustakeloon		9229				Yes	
Samir Sader	Bekaa 1	MA	Seyadeyoon Moustakeloon		1307					
Yousif Karaouni	Bekaa 1	GO	Seyadeyoon Moustakeloon		297					
Omar Halablab	Bekaa 1	SU	Seyadeyoon Moustakeloon		3126					
Firas Abou Hamdan	Bekaa 1	SH	Seyadeyoon Moustakeloon		585					
Martine Demerjian	Bekaa 1	AO	Seyadeyoon Moustakeloon		104					Venus symbol
Petra Semaha	Bekaa 1	GC	Kadreen Nouwajeh	MMFD	628					Venus symbol
Rami Abou Eid	Bekaa 1	GC	Kadreen Nouwajeh	MMFD	72					
Ghassan Homaimes	Bekaa 1	MA	Kadreen Nouwajeh	MMFD	272					
Rania Al Mays	Bekaa 1	SU	Kadreen Nouwajeh	MMFD	252					Venus symbol
Hasan Mourad	Bekaa 2	SU	Al Ghad Al Afdal	Union Party	9157				Yes	
Kabalan Kabalan	Bekaa 2	SH	Al Ghad Al Afdal	Amal	10143				Yes	
Charbel Maroun	Bekaa 2	MA	Al Ghad Al Afdal	FPM	3576				Yes	
Elie Ferzli	Bekaa 2	GO	Al Ghad Al Afdal		2304					
Tarek Daoud	Bekaa 2	DR	Al Ghad Al Afdal	LASM	2670					
Mohammad Al Karaawi	Bekaa 2	SU	Al Karar Al Watani Al Moustakel		4811					
Ali Abou Yassine	Bekaa 2	SU	Al Karar Al Watani Al Moustakel	Jamaa Islamiyya	2928					
Abbas Eidi	Bekaa 2	SH	Al Karar Al Watani Al Moustakel		294					
Jihad Al Zarzour	Bekaa 2	MA	Al Karar Al Watani Al Moustakel		571					
Ghassan Skaff	Bekaa 2	GO	Al Karar Al Watani Al Moustakel		776				Yes	
Wael Abou Faour	Bekaa 2	DR	Al Karar Al Watani Al Moustakel	PSP	9202				Yes	
Khaled Al Askar	Bekaa 2	SU	Bekaaouna Awalan		21					
Mohammad Kaddoura	Bekaa 2	SU	Bekaaouna Awalan		70					
Ghenwa Assaad	Bekaa 2	SH	Bekaaouna Awalan		92					Venus symbol
Dani Khater	Bekaa 2	MA	Bekaaouna Awalan	Lebanese Forces	4761					
George Abboud	Bekaa 2	GO	Bekaaouna Awalan		191					
Oussama Abou Zeid	Bekaa 2	SU	Qadreen	MMFD	39					
Farah Kassem	Bekaa 2	SH	Qadreen	MMFD	358					Venus symbol
Ghada Ghanem	Bekaa 2	MA	Qadreen	MMFD	105					Venus symbol
Magge Mehanna	Bekaa 2	DR	Qadreen	MMFD	111					Venus symbol
Yassine Yassine	Bekaa 2	SU	Laehat Sahlouna Wal Jabal		6004				Yes	
Hatem Al Kheshen	Bekaa 2	SH	Laehat Sahlouna Wal Jabal		565					
Maguy Aoun	Bekaa 2	MA	Laehat Sahlouna Wal Jabal		1825					Venus symbol
Sally Chemieh	Bekaa 2	GO	Laehat Sahlouna Wal Jabal		992					Venus symbol
Bahaa Dalal	Bekaa 2	DR	Laehat Sahlouna Wal Jabal		1609					
Alaa Al Chemali	Bekaa 2	SU	Nahwa Al Teghyeer		57					
Amer Kaddoura	Bekaa 2	SU	Nahwa Al Teghyeer		7					
Guitta Al Ojeil	Bekaa 2	MA	Nahwa Al Teghyeer	Kataeb	86					Venus symbol
Shawki Abou Ghoush	Bekaa 2	DR	Nahwa Al Teghyeer		19					
Ali Al Mokdad	Bekaa 3	SH	Al Amal Wa Al Wafaa	Hezbollah	20356				Yes	
Ghazi Zaiter	Bekaa 3	SH	Al Amal Wa Al Wafaa	Amal	22058				Yes	
Husein Al Hajj Hasan	Bekaa 3	SH	Al Amal Wa Al Wafaa	Hezbollah	23120				Yes	
Ibrahim Al Mousaui	Bekaa 3	SH	Al Amal Wa Al Wafaa	Hezbollah	19627				Yes	
Jamil Al Sayyed	Bekaa 3	SH	Al Amal Wa Al Wafaa		11705				Yes	
Ihab Hamadeh	Bekaa 3	SH	Al Amal Wa Al Wafaa	Hezbollah	20844				Yes	
Melhem Al Hojairi	Bekaa 3	SU	Al Amal Wa Al Wafaa		7125				Yes	
Yanal Saleh	Bekaa 3	SU	Al Amal Wa Al Wafaa		8764				Yes	
Akid Hadchiti	Bekaa 3	MA	Al Amal Wa Al Wafaa	SSNP	4767					
Samer Al Toum	Bekaa 3	GC	Al Amal Wa Al Wafaa	FPM	11343				Yes	
Ali Abi Raad	Bekaa 3	SH	Ehtilaf Al Taghyeer		266					
Oussama Shamas	Bekaa 3	SH	Ehtilaf Al Taghyeer		112					
Sami Al Toufaili	Bekaa 3	SH	Ehtilaf Al Taghyeer		284					
Alsharif Sleiman	Bekaa 3	SH	Ehtilaf Al Taghyeer	Mada	1259					
Abbas Yaghi	Bekaa 3	SH	Ehtilaf Al Taghyeer		252					
Khaled Saleh	Bekaa 3	SU	Ehtilaf Al Taghyeer	Tahalof Watani	819					
Mohammad Al Hojairi	Bekaa 3	SU	Ehtilaf Al Taghyeer		1518					
Youssif Al Fakhri	Bekaa 3	MA	Ehtilaf Al Taghyeer	Sabaa	272					
Talal Al Makdissi	Bekaa 3	GC	Ehtilaf Al Taghyeer		551					
Rachid Issa	Bekaa 3	SH	Binaa Al Dawla		45					
Haiman Meheik	Bekaa 3	SH	Binaa Al Dawla		5					
Ramez Kamhaz	Bekaa 3	SH	Binaa Al Dawla		14					
Husein Raad	Bekaa 3	SH	Binaa Al Dawla		30					
Refaat Al Masri	Bekaa 3	SH	Binaa Al Dawla		62					
Abbass Al Jaouhari	Bekaa 3	SH	Binaa Al Dawla		658					
Saleh Al Shall	Bekaa 3	SU	Binaa Al Dawla		1343					
Zeidan Al Hojairi	Bekaa 3	SU	Binaa Al Dawla		1827					
Antoine Habshi	Bekaa 3	MA	Binaa Al Dawla	Lebanese Forces	17000				Yes	
Elie Al Bitar	Bekaa 3	GC	Binaa Al Dawla	Lebanese Forces	1694					
Mohammad Al Jebawi	Bekaa 3	SH	Kadreen	MMFD	171					
Sara Zaiter	Bekaa 3	SH	Kadreen	MMFD	1082					Venus symbol
Daher Amhaz	Bekaa 3	SH	Kadreen	MMFD	70					
Michel Mehanna	Bekaa 3	GC	Kadreen	MMFD	461					
Medhat Zaiter	Bekaa 3	SH	Laehat Al Ashaer wa Al Aaelat Lel Enmaa		31					
Hasan Al Masri	Bekaa 3	SH	Laehat Al Ashaer wa Al Aaelat Lel Enmaa		510					
Shahrazad Hamieh	Bekaa 3	SH	Laehat Al Ashaer wa Al Aaelat Lel Enmaa		9					Venus symbol
Mohammad Othman	Bekaa 3	SH	Laehat Al Ashaer wa Al Aaelat Lel Enmaa		36					
Mohammad Fleiti	Bekaa 3	SU	Laehat Al Ashaer wa Al Aaelat Lel Enmaa		701					
Ali Al Moula	Bekaa 3	SU	Laehat Al Ashaer wa Al Aaelat Lel Enmaa		69					
Hasan Mazloum	Bekaa 3	SH	Moustakeloon Dod Al Fasad		247					
Alsayyed Ahmad Shokor	Bekaa 3	SH	Moustakeloon Dod Al Fasad		53					
Hussein Darouiche	Bekaa 3	SH	Moustakeloon Dod Al Fasad		159					
Imad Nassereddine	Bekaa 3	SH	Moustakeloon Dod Al Fasad		580					
Hani Shamas	Bekaa 3	SH	Moustakeloon Dod Al Fasad		212					
Ahmad Karnabi	Bekaa 3	SU	Moustakeloon Dod Al Fasad		554					
Ali Abdelhamid	Bekaa 3	SU	Moustakeloon Dod Al Fasad		319					
Shawki Al Fakhri	Bekaa 3	MA	Moustakeloon Dod Al Fasad		87					
Abdallah Aad	Bekaa 3	GC	Moustakeloon Dod Al Fasad		107					
Fares Souaid	Mount Lebanon 1 (Jbeil)	MA	Alhorryia Karar		4957					
Asaad Reshdan	Mount Lebanon 1 (Jbeil)	MA	Alhorryia Karar		59					
Mashhour Ahmad	Mount Lebanon 1 (Jbeil)	SH	Alhorryia Karar		246					
Najwa Bassil	Mount Lebanon 1 (Jbeil)	MA	Sarkhat Watan		2525					Venus symbol
Naufal Naufal	Mount Lebanon 1 (Jbeil)	MA	Sarkhat Watan		3211					
Amir Al Mokdad	Mount Lebanon 1 (Jbeil)	SH	Sarkhat Watan		952					
Dominik Tarabai	Mount Lebanon 1 (Jbeil)	MA	Kadreen	MMFD	490					
Farah Nasser	Mount Lebanon 1 (Jbeil)	SH	Kadreen	MMFD	220					Venus symbol
Emile Naufal	Mount Lebanon 1 (Jbeil)	MA	Alb Loubnan Al Moustakel		2413					
Toni Khairallah	Mount Lebanon 1 (Jbeil)	MA	Alb Loubnan Al Moustakel		455					
Ahmad Al Mokdad	Mount Lebanon 1 (Jbeil)	SH	Alb Loubnan Al Moustakel		929					
Walid Al Khouri	Mount Lebanon 1 (Jbeil)	MA	Kenna w Rah Nebaa	FPM	4149					
Simon Abi Ramia	Mount Lebanon 1 (Jbeil)	MA	Kenna w Rah Nebaa	FPM	6239				Yes	
Raed Berro	Mount Lebanon 1 (Jbeil)	SH	Kenna w Rah Nebaa	Hezbollah	9508				Yes	
Ziad Hawat	Mount Lebanon 1 (Jbeil)	MA	Maakom Fina Lalaakher	Lebanese Forces	13078				Yes	
Habib Barakat	Mount Lebanon 1 (Jbeil)	MA	Maakom Fina Lalaakher		471					
Mahmoud Awad	Mount Lebanon 1 (Jbeil)	SH	Maakom Fina Lalaakher		508					
Rania Bassil	Mount Lebanon 1 (Jbeil)	MA	Nehna Al Taghyeer	Sabaa	242					Venus symbol
Ghassan Germanos	Mount Lebanon 1 (Jbeil)	MA	Nehna Al Taghyeer		515					
Talal Mokdad	Mount Lebanon 1 (Jbeil)	SH	Nehna Al Taghyeer		88					
Bahjat Salama	Mount Lebanon 1 (Keserwan)	MA	Alhorryia Karar		42					
Mansour Al Bon	Mount Lebanon 1 (Keserwan)	MA	Alhorryia Karar		5581					
Moussa Zgheib	Mount Lebanon 1 (Keserwan)	MA	Alhorryia Karar		53					
Neamat Frem	Mount Lebanon 1 (Keserwan)	MA	Sarkhat Watan		10743				Yes	
Wajdi Tabet	Mount Lebanon 1 (Keserwan)	MA	Sarkhat Watan	National Bloc	1179					
Salim Al Sayegh	Mount Lebanon 1 (Keserwan)	MA	Sarkhat Watan	Kataeb	3477				Yes	
Josephine Zgheib	Mount Lebanon 1 (Keserwan)	MA	Sarkhat Watan		1303					Venus symbol
Julie Al Dakkache	Mount Lebanon 1 (Keserwan)	MA	Sarkhat Watan		769					Venus symbol
Butros Khalil	Mount Lebanon 1 (Keserwan)	MA	Kadreen	MMFD	692					
Charbel Freiha	Mount Lebanon 1 (Keserwan)	MA	Kadreen	MMFD	261					
Farid Haykal Khazen	Mount Lebanon 1 (Keserwan)	MA	Alb Loubnan Al Moustakel		9056				Yes	
Taufik Salloum	Mount Lebanon 1 (Keserwan)	MA	Alb Loubnan Al Moustakel		178					
Chamel Roukoz	Mount Lebanon 1 (Keserwan)	MA	Alb Loubnan Al Moustakel		623					
Shaker Salama	Mount Lebanon 1 (Keserwan)	MA	Alb Loubnan Al Moustakel		215					
Salim Hani	Mount Lebanon 1 (Keserwan)	MA	Alb Loubnan Al Moustakel		533					
Wassim Salama	Mount Lebanon 1 (Keserwan)	MA	Kenna w Rah Nebaa		1155					
Rabih Zgheib	Mount Lebanon 1 (Keserwan)	MA	Kenna w Rah Nebaa		367					
Toni Al Kerdi	Mount Lebanon 1 (Keserwan)	MA	Kenna w Rah Nebaa		413					
Imad Azar	Mount Lebanon 1 (Keserwan)	MA	Kenna w Rah Nebaa		366					
Nada Al Boustani	Mount Lebanon 1 (Keserwan)	MA	Kenna w Rah Nebaa	FPM	11338				Yes	Venus symbol
Karen Al Boustani	Mount Lebanon 1 (Keserwan)	MA	Maakom Fina Lalaakher		432					Venus symbol
Shauki Al Dakkache	Mount Lebanon 1 (Keserwan)	MA	Maakom Fina Lalaakher	Lebanese Forces	9129				Yes	
Joe Raidy	Mount Lebanon 1 (Keserwan)	MA	Maakom Fina Lalaakher		117					
Shadi Fayyad	Mount Lebanon 1 (Keserwan)	MA	Maakom Fina Lalaakher		2211					
Antoine Sfeir	Mount Lebanon 1 (Keserwan)	MA	Maakom Fina Lalaakher		1330					
Zeina Al Kallab	Mount Lebanon 1 (Keserwan)	MA	Nehna Al Taghyeer		413					Venus symbol
Simon Sfeir	Mount Lebanon 1 (Keserwan)	MA	Nehna Al Taghyeer		142					
Nasri Lahhoud	Mount Lebanon 2	MA	Kenna w Rah Nebaa – Al Matn		414					
Ibrahim Kenaan	Mount Lebanon 2	MA	Kenna w Rah Nebaa – Al Matn	FPM	5513				Yes	
Elias Bou Saab	Mount Lebanon 2	GO	Kenna w Rah Nebaa – Al Matn	FPM	4050				Yes	
Edgard Maalouf	Mount Lebanon 2	GC	Kenna w Rah Nebaa – Al Matn	FPM	10006					
Ricardo Malikian	Mount Lebanon 2	AO	Kenna w Rah Nebaa – Al Matn		80					
Simaan Bou Fadel	Mount Lebanon 2	MA	Matn Lel Taghyeer		715					
Sami El Gemayel	Mount Lebanon 2	MA	Matn Lel Taghyeer	Kataeb	10466				Yes	
Elias Hankash	Mount Lebanon 2	MA	Matn Lel Taghyeer	Kataeb	6148				Yes	
Mona Succar	Mount Lebanon 2	MA	Matn Lel Taghyeer		636					Venus symbol
Samir Saliba	Mount Lebanon 2	GO	Matn Lel Taghyeer	Ana Khatt Ahmar	3219					
Rima Njeim	Mount Lebanon 2	GC	Matn Lel Taghyeer		364					Venus symbol
Krikor Mardikian	Mount Lebanon 2	AO	Matn Lel Taghyeer		211					
Farid Zeinoun	Mount Lebanon 2	MA	Matn Al Horeyya		107					
Rashid Abou Jaoude	Mount Lebanon 2	MA	Matn Al Horeyya	NLP	279					
Razi El Hajj	Mount Lebanon 2	MA	Matn Al Horeyya	Lebanese Forces	3459				Yes	
Salim Al Jalakh	Mount Lebanon 2	MA	Matn Al Horeyya		112					
Hani Saliba	Mount Lebanon 2	GO	Matn Al Horeyya		1404					
Melhem Riachy	Mount Lebanon 2	GC	Matn Al Horeyya	Lebaense Forces	15254				Yes	
Ara Bardakgian	Mount Lebanon 2	AO	Matn Al Horeyya	Hunchak	237					
Wael Sakr	Mount Lebanon 2	MA	Matneyyoon Seyadeyyoon		11					
Romanos Raad	Mount Lebanon 2	MA	Matneyyoon Seyadeyyoon		75					
Paul Naccouzi	Mount Lebanon 2	MA	Matneyyoon Seyadeyyoon		155					
Charbel Abou Jaoude	Mount Lebanon 2	MA	Matneyyoon Seyadeyyoon	Tahalof Watani	166					
Shady Beshara	Mount Lebanon 2	GO	Matneyyoon Seyadeyyoon		76					
Alfred Reyyashi	Mount Lebanon 2	GC	Matneyyoon Seyadeyyoon		100					
Shant Sarafian	Mount Lebanon 2	AO	Matneyyoon Seyadeyyoon		29					
Maroun Rizkallah	Mount Lebanon 2	MA	Maan Akwa		42					
Maroun Abou Diwan	Mount Lebanon 2	MA	Maan Akwa		83					
Antoine Khalil	Mount Lebanon 2	MA	Maan Akwa	SSNP	1370					
Randa Abboud	Mount Lebanon 2	MA	Maan Akwa		198					Venus symbol
Joyce Jammal	Mount Lebanon 2	GO	Maan Akwa		40					Venus symbol
Michel El Murr	Mount Lebanon 2	GO	Maan Akwa		8607				Yes	
Leah Bou Chaaya	Mount Lebanon 2	GC	Maan Akwa		136					Venus symbol
Hagop Pakradonian	Mount Lebanon 2	AO	Maan Akwa	Tashnaq	4973				Yes	
Verena El Amil	Mount Lebanon 2	MA	Nahwa Al Dawla	Jil El Teghyir	855					Venus symbol
Jad Ghosn	Mount Lebanon 2	MA	Nahwa Al Dawla	MMFD	8526					
Miriam Jabr	Mount Lebanon 2	MA	Nahwa Al Dawla	MMFD	618					Venus symbol
Shaden Maalouf	Mount Lebanon 2	GO	Nahwa Al Dawla	MMFD	138					Venus symbol
Lucien Bou Rjeili	Mount Lebanon 2	GC	Nahwa Al Dawla	Lana	1149					
Robert Khalife	Mount Lebanon 3	MA	Baabda Al Taghyeer		313					
Michel Helou	Mount Lebanon 3	MA	Baabda Al Taghyeer	National Bloc	5483					
Ziad Akl	Mount Lebanon 3	MA	Baabda Al Taghyeer	Tahalof Watani	1964					
Wassef Al Harake	Mount Lebanon 3	SH	Baabda Al Taghyeer	Popular Observatory	4092					
Abir Naji	Mount Lebanon 3	DR	Baabda Al Taghyeer	Lihaqqi	928					Venus symbol
Camille Chamoun	Mount Lebanon 3	MA	Baabda Al Seyada Wal Karar	NLP	1876				Yes	
Pierre Bou Assi	Mount Lebanon 3	MA	Baabda Al Seyada Wal Karar	Lebanese Forces	14756				Yes	
Alexander Karam	Mount Lebanon 3	MA	Baabda Al Seyada Wal Karar		1450					
Said Alama	Mount Lebanon 3	SH	Baabda Al Seyada Wal Karar		81					
Saad Slim	Mount Lebanon 3	SH	Baabda Al Seyada Wal Karar		200					
Hadi Abou Al Hosn	Mount Lebanon 3	DR	Baabda Al Seyada Wal Karar	PSP	10767				Yes	
Khalil Al Helou	Mount Lebanon 3	MA	Baabda Tantafid	Kataeb	3819					
Jean Younes	Mount Lebanon 3	MA	Baabda Tantafid		265					
Naim Aoun	Mount Lebanon 3	MA	Baabda Tantafid		566					
Ramzi Kanj	Mount Lebanon 3	SH	Baabda Tantafid		228					
Rani Al Rajji	Mount Lebanon 3	MA	Qadreen	MMFD	219					
Mohammad Sakr	Mount Lebanon 3	SH	Qadreen	MMFD	56					
Ali Darouiche	Mount Lebanon 3	SH	Qadreen	MMFD	560					
Alain Aoun	Mount Lebanon 3	MA	Laehat Al Wifak Al Watani	FPM	8457				Yes	
Fadi Abou Rahhal	Mount Lebanon 3	MA	Laehat Al Wifak Al Watani	FPM	1773					
Shadi Waked	Mount Lebanon 3	MA	Laehat Al Wifak Al Watani		2036					
Fadi Alame	Mount Lebanon 3	SH	Laehat Al Wifak Al Watani	Amal	4862				Yes	
Ali Ammar	Mount Lebanon 3	SH	Laehat Al Wifak Al Watani	Hezbollah	14852				Yes	
Farouq Al Awar	Mount Lebanon 3	DR	Laehat Al Wifak Al Watani	LDP	1037					
Patrick Abou Shakra	Mount Lebanon 3	MA	Maan Nastateh		84					
Amal Abou Farhat	Mount Lebanon 3	MA	Maan Nastateh		56					Venus symbol
Abdo Saadeh	Mount Lebanon 3	MA	Maan Nastateh		104					
Youssif Al Shaabine	Mount Lebanon 3	SH	Maan Nastateh		12					
Bilal Alame	Mount Lebanon 3	SH	Maan Nastateh		70					
Fadi Al Awar	Mount Lebanon 3	DR	Maan Nastateh		24					
Pierre Baaklini	Mount Lebanon 3	MA	Nehna Al Taghyeer		272					
Michel Chamoun	Mount Lebanon 3	MA	Nehna Al Taghyeer		409					
Oussama Al Awar	Mount Lebanon 3	DR	Nehna Al Taghyeer		45					
Nabil Mchantaf	Mount Lebanon 4 (Chouf)	MA	Al Jabal Yantafid		31					
Abdallah Abou Abdallah	Mount Lebanon 4 (Chouf)	MA	Al Jabal Yantafid		233					
Zeina Mansour	Mount Lebanon 4 (Chouf)	DR	Al Jabal Yantafid		35					Venus symbol
Akram Breish	Mount Lebanon 4 (Chouf)	DR	Al Jabal Yantafid		26					
Habouba Aoun	Mount Lebanon 4 (Chouf)	MA	Al Sharaka wa Al Irada		681					Venus symbol
Georges Adwan	Mount Lebanon 4 (Chouf)	MA	Al Sharaka wa Al Irada	Lebanese Forces	11433				Yes	
Elie Kerdahi	Mount Lebanon 4 (Chouf)	MA	Al Sharaka wa Al Irada		1914					
Taymour Joumblatt	Mount Lebanon 4 (Chouf)	DR	Al Sharaka wa Al Irada	PSP	12917				Yes	
Marwan Hamadeh	Mount Lebanon 4 (Chouf)	DR	Al Sharaka wa Al Irada	PSP	11121				Yes	
Bilal Abdallah	Mount Lebanon 4 (Chouf)	SU	Al Sharaka wa Al Irada	PSP	8186				Yes	
Saadaldine Al Khatib	Mount Lebanon 4 (Chouf)	SU	Al Sharaka wa Al Irada		3656					
Fadi Maalouf	Mount Lebanon 4 (Chouf)	GC	Al Sharaka wa Al Irada	NLP	1482					
Sououd Abou Chebel	Mount Lebanon 4 (Chouf)	MA	Tawahadna Lel Taghyeer	Kataeb	854					
Najat Aoun Saliba	Mount Lebanon 4 (Chouf)	MA	Tawahadna Lel Taghyeer	Taqaddum	9332				Yes	Venus symbol
Ghada Eid	Mount Lebanon 4 (Chouf)	MA	Tawahadna Lel Taghyeer	Lana	2982					
Rania Ghayth	Mount Lebanon 4 (Chouf)	DR	Tawahadna Lel Taghyeer		1978					
Halime Kaakour	Mount Lebanon 4 (Chouf)	SU	Tawahadna Lel Taghyeer	Lana	6684				Yes	
Imad Seifeddine	Mount Lebanon 4 (Chouf)	SU	Tawahadna Lel Taghyeer	LCP	1860					
Shukri Haddad	Mount Lebanon 4 (Chouf)	GC	Tawahadna Lel Taghyeer		390					
George Selwan	Mount Lebanon 4 (Chouf)	MA	Seyadat Watan		25					
Daad Azzi	Mount Lebanon 4 (Chouf)	MA	Seyadat Watan		334					Venus symbol
Joyce Maroun	Mount Lebanon 4 (Chouf)	MA	Seyadat Watan		32					Venus symbol
Hisham Zebian	Mount Lebanon 4 (Chouf)	DR	Seyadat Watan		79					
Mohammad Al Shamaa	Mount Lebanon 4 (Chouf)	SU	Seyadat Watan		5119					
Maamoun Malak	Mount Lebanon 4 (Chouf)	SU	Seyadat Watan		279					
Michel Abou Sleiman	Mount Lebanon 4 (Chouf)	MA	Sawtak Thawra		186					
Jamal Merhej	Mount Lebanon 4 (Chouf)	MA	Sawtak Thawra		95					
Gabi Azzi	Mount Lebanon 4 (Chouf)	MA	Sawtak Thawra		105					
Jihad Zebian	Mount Lebanon 4 (Chouf)	DR	Sawtak Thawra		32					
Modad Abou Ali	Mount Lebanon 4 (Chouf)	DR	Sawtak Thawra		2					
Samir Akkoum	Mount Lebanon 4 (Chouf)	SU	Sawtak Thawra		207					
Mohamad Sami Hajjar	Mount Lebanon 4 (Chouf)	SU	Sawtak Thawra		1301					
Joseph Tohme	Mount Lebanon 4 (Chouf)	MA	Qadreen	MMFD	144					
Aiman Zeineddine	Mount Lebanon 4 (Chouf)	DR	Qadreen	MMFD	276					
Khaled Saad	Mount Lebanon 4 (Chouf)	SU	Qadreen	MMFD	341					
Imad Al Farran	Mount Lebanon 4 (Chouf)	SU	Qadreen	MMFD	20					
Antoine Abboud	Mount Lebanon 4 (Chouf)	MA	Laehat Al Jabal		273					
Farid Al Boustani	Mount Lebanon 4 (Chouf)	MA	Laehat Al Jabal	FPM	4347				Yes	
Naji Al Boustani	Mount Lebanon 4 (Chouf)	MA	Laehat Al Jabal		2588					
Wiam Wahhab	Mount Lebanon 4 (Chouf)	DR	Laehat Al Jabal	Arab Unification Party	10228					
Oussama Al Maoush	Mount Lebanon 4 (Chouf)	SU	Laehat Al Jabal		435					
Ahmad Najmaldeen	Mount Lebanon 4 (Chouf)	SU	Laehat Al Jabal		1432					
Ghassan Atallah	Mount Lebanon 4 (Chouf)	GC	Laehat Al Jabal	FPM	5149				Yes	
Tabet Tabet	Mount Lebanon 4 (Aley)	MA	Al Jabal Yantafid		32					
Mohsen Al Aridi	Mount Lebanon 4 (Aley)	DR	Al Jabal Yantafid		30					
Salman Abdel Khalek	Mount Lebanon 4 (Aley)	DR	Al Jabal Yantafid		2					
Leon Siufi	Mount Lebanon 4 (Aley)	GO	Al Jabal Yantafid		24					
Joelle Faddoul	Mount Lebanon 4 (Aley)	MA	Al Sharaka wa Al Irada		567					Venus symbol
Raji Al Saad	Mount Lebanon 4 (Aley)	MA	Al Sharaka wa Al Irada	PSP	8503				Yes	
Akram Chehayyeb	Mount Lebanon 4 (Aley)	DR	Al Sharaka wa Al Irada	PSP	11373				Yes	
Nazih Matta	Mount Lebanon 4 (Aley)	GO	Al Sharaka wa Al Irada	Lebanese Forces	9191				Yes	
Jad Bejjani	Mount Lebanon 4 (Aley)	MA	Tawahadna Lel Taghyeer	Kataeb	605					
Fadi Abi Allam	Mount Lebanon 4 (Aley)	MA	Tawahadna Lel Taghyeer		603					
Alaa El Sayegh	Mount Lebanon 4 (Aley)	DR	Tawahadna Lel Taghyeer		1565					
Mark Daou	Mount Lebanon 4 (Aley)	DR	Tawahadna Lel Taghyeer	Taqaddum	11656				Yes	
Zoya Jreidini	Mount Lebanon 4 (Aley)	GO	Tawahadna Lel Taghyeer	LCP	2084					Venus symbol
Nabil Yazbek	Mount Lebanon 4 (Aley)	MA	Seyadat Watan		36					
Walid Chahine	Mount Lebanon 4 (Aley)	MA	Seyadat Watan		78					
Atallah Wehbi	Mount Lebanon 4 (Aley)	DR	Seyadat Watan		12					
Imad Hage	Mount Lebanon 4 (Aley)	MA	Sawtak Thawra		874					
Wassim Haidar	Mount Lebanon 4 (Aley)	DR	Sawtak Thawra		218					
Raed Abdel Khalek	Mount Lebanon 4 (Aley)	DR	Sawtak Thawra		115					
Marwan Imad	Mount Lebanon 4 (Aley)	DR	Qadreen	MMFD	330					
Nagham Al Halabi	Mount Lebanon 4 (Aley)	DR	Qadreen	MMFD	275					
Antoine Al Boustani	Mount Lebanon 4 (Aley)	MA	Laehat Al Jabal		67					
Cesar Abi Khalil	Mount Lebanon 4 (Aley)	MA	Laehat Al Jabal	FPM	5698				Yes	
Talal Arslan	Mount Lebanon 4 (Aley)	DR	Laehat Al Jabal	LDP	9008					
Tarek Khairallah	Mount Lebanon 4 (Aley)	GO	Laehat Al Jabal		1271					
Saadallah Al Hamad	North 1	SU	Al Nohoud Li Akkar		29					
Wassim Al Merhebi	North 1	SU	Al Nohoud Li Akkar		5000					
Mahmoud Hadarah	North 1	SU	Al Nohoud Li Akkar		5017					
Nafez Warrak	North 1	GO	Al Nohoud Li Akkar		155					
Hicham Chbib	North 1	GO	Al Nohoud Li Akkar		775					
Tanios Al Khoury	North 1	MA	Al Nohoud Li Akkar		233					
Mohsen Hussein	North 1	AL	Al Nohoud Li Akkar		282					
Ammar Rasheed	North 1	SU	Al Wafaa Li Akkar		242					
Ali Tlais	North 1	SU	Al Wafaa Li Akkar		6645					
Haitham Ezzedine	North 1	SU	Al Wafaa Li Akkar		3588					
Elie Deeb	North 1	GO	Al Wafaa Li Akkar		319					
Elie Saad	North 1	GO	Al Wafaa Li Akkar		1171					
Joseph Mikhael	North 1	MA	Al Wafaa Li Akkar		581					
Ahmad Al Hadam	North 1	AL	Al Wafaa Li Akkar		455					
Khaled Al Daher	North 1	SU	Akkar		2479					
Talal Al Merhebi	North 1	SU	Akkar		3159					
Mohammad Ibrahim	North 1	SU	Akkar		3481					
Wissam Mansour	North 1	GO	Akkar	Lebanese Forces	8264					
Ziad Rahhal	North 1	GO	Akkar		464					
Michel Al Khoury	North 1	MA	Akkar		893					
Fawaz Mohammad	North 1	AL	Akkar		153					
Khaled Alloush	North 1	SU	Akkar Al Taghyeer		1435					
Berri Al Assaad	North 1	SU	Akkar Al Taghyeer		1111					
Mohammad Badra	North 1	SU	Akkar Al Taghyeer		9302					
Wafaa Gemayel	North 1	GO	Akkar Al Taghyeer		176					
Lloris El Rahi	North 1	GO	Akkar Al Taghyeer		390					Venus symbol
Edgard Daher	North 1	MA	Akkar Al Taghyeer		947					
Jinan Hamdan	North 1	AL	Akkar Al Taghyeer		361					Venus symbol
Karam Al Daher	North 1	SU	Akkar Awalan		1528					
Hatem Saadaldine	North 1	SU	Akkar Awalan		1864					
Mohammad Yehya	North 1	SU	Akkar Awalan		15142				Yes	
Assaad Dergham	North 1	GO	Akkar Awalan	FPM	5754				Yes	
Shakeeb Abboud	North 1	GO	Akkar Awalan	SSNP	3384					
Jimmy Jabbour	North 1	MA	Akkar Awalan	FPM	8986				Yes	
Haidar Issa	North 1	AL	Akkar Awalan		3948					
Mohammad Mousilmani	North 1	SU	Akkar Tantafid		97					
Abdelrazzak Al Kilani	North 1	SU	Akkar Tantafid		64					
Khaled Al Daher	North 1	SU	Akkar Tantafid		1038					
Reine Sawane	North 1	MA	Akkar Tantafid		72					Venus symbol
Nizar Ibrahim	North 1	AL	Akkar Tantafid		15					
Ibrahim Al Masoomhi	North 1	SU	Laehat Al Ihtidal Al Watani		7370					
Walid Al Baarini	North 1	SU	Laehat Al Ihtidal Al Watani		11099				Yes	
Mohammad Sleiman	North 1	SU	Laehat Al Ihtidal Al Watani		11340				Yes	
Julie Hanna	North 1	GO	Laehat Al Ihtidal Al Watani		1264					Venus symbol
Sajeeh Ateya	North 1	GO	Laehat Al Ihtidal Al Watani		1948				Yes	
Hadi Hobeish	North 1	MA	Laehat Al Ihtidal Al Watani		7546					
Ahmad Rustom	North 1	AL	Laehat Al Ihtidal Al Watani		324				Yes	
Roula Al Mourad	North 1	SU	Nahwa Al Muwatana		496					Venus symbol
Ahmad Moustapha	North 1	SU	Nahwa Al Muwatana	LCP	489					
Ghaith Hammoud	North 1	SU	Nahwa Al Muwatana		361					
Nazih Ibrahim	North 1	GO	Nahwa Al Muwatana	MMFD	91					
Michel Taaoum	North 1	GO	Nahwa Al Muwatana		834					
Ralph Daher	North 1	MA	Nahwa Al Muwatana	MMFD	774					
Ali Nour	North 2 (Tripoli)	SU	Al Irada Al Shaabiya		588					
Faisal Karami	North 2 (Tripoli)	SU	Al Irada Al Shaabiya	Dignity Movement	6494					
Taha Naji	North 2 (Tripoli)	SU	Al Irada Al Shaabiya	Al-Ahbash	7407				Yes	
Ahmad Amine	North 2 (Tripoli)	SU	Al Irada Al Shaabiya		506					
Rami Assoum	North 2 (Tripoli)	SU	Al Irada Al Shaabiya		186					
George Shabtini	North 2 (Tripoli)	MA	Al Irada Al Shaabiya		338					
Rafli Diab	North 2 (Tripoli)	GO	Al Irada Al Shaabiya	Marada	2294					
Mohammad Al Traboulsi	North 2 (Tripoli)	AL	Al Irada Al Shaabiya		1021					
Jihad Al Samad	North 2 (Dennieh)	SU	Al Irada Al Shaabiya		7824				Yes	
Nabras Alamuddin	North 2 (Mennieh)	SU	Al Irada Al Shaabiya		1126					
Bassel Al Osta	North 2 (Tripoli)	SU	Al Istikrar Wa Al Inmaa		207					
Dima Dennaoui	North 2 (Tripoli)	SU	Al Istikrar Wa Al Inmaa		5					Venus symbol
Younis Al Hasan	North 2 (Tripoli)	SU	Al Istikrar Wa Al Inmaa		29					
Sawsan Kashha	North 2 (Tripoli)	SU	Al Istikrar Wa Al Inmaa		11					Venus symbol
Mayez Al Jundi	North 2 (Tripoli)	SU	Al Istikrar Wa Al Inmaa		70					
Michel Al Khoury	North 2 (Tripoli)	MA	Al Istikrar Wa Al Inmaa		12					
Saleh Al Deeb	North 2 (Tripoli)	AL	Al Istikrar Wa Al Inmaa		717					
Kamel Bakkour	North 2 (Dennieh)	SU	Al Istikrar Wa Al Inmaa		33					
Abdelkader Al Chami	North 2 (Dennieh)	SU	Al Istikrar Wa Al Inmaa		10					
Fadi Al Kheir	North 2 (Mennieh)	SU	Al Istikrar Wa Al Inmaa		157					
Farah Haddad	North 2 (Tripoli)	SU	Al Taghyeer Al Hakiki		306					Venus symbol
Azzam Ayoubi	North 2 (Tripoli)	SU	Al Taghyeer Al Hakiki		4569					
Ahmad Al Marj	North 2 (Tripoli)	SU	Al Taghyeer Al Hakiki		173					
Zein Moustapha	North 2 (Tripoli)	SU	Al Taghyeer Al Hakiki		117					
Ihab Mattar	North 2 (Tripoli)	SU	Al Taghyeer Al Hakiki		6518				Yes	
Paul Al Hamedd	North 2 (Tripoli)	MA	Al Taghyeer Al Hakiki		15					
Moutanios Mahfoud	North 2 (Tripoli)	GO	Al Taghyeer Al Hakiki		250					
Firas Al Salloum	North 2 (Tripoli)	AL	Al Taghyeer Al Hakiki		370				Yes	
Mahmoud Al Sayyed	North 2 (Dennieh)	SU	Al Taghyeer Al Hakiki		2271					
Samir Taleb	North 2 (Dennieh)	SU	Al Taghyeer Al Hakiki		648					
Mohammad Dahabi	North 2 (Mennieh)	SU	Al Taghyeer Al Hakiki		1052					
Douha Ahmad	North 2 (Tripoli)	SU	Al Jomhoureyya Al Thaletha		58					Venus symbol
Diala Al Osta	North 2 (Tripoli)	SU	Al Jomhoureyya Al Thaletha		9					Venus symbol
Abdelraheem Dergham	North 2 (Tripoli)	SU	Al Jomhoureyya Al Thaletha		35					
Omar Harfoush	North 2 (Tripoli)	SU	Al Jomhoureyya Al Thaletha		1003					
Jeanette Frangieh	North 2 (Tripoli)	MA	Al Jomhoureyya Al Thaletha		58					Venus symbol
Alfred Dourah	North 2 (Tripoli)	GO	Al Jomhoureyya Al Thaletha		1285					
Ahmad Ali	North 2 (Tripoli)	AL	Al Jomhoureyya Al Thaletha		146					
Nazih Zoud	North 2 (Dennieh)	SU	Al Jomhoureyya Al Thaletha		121					
Mohammad Zreik	North 2 (Mennieh)	SU	Al Jomhoureyya Al Thaletha		150					
Zakaria Mseikeh	North 2 (Tripoli)	SU	Intafid.. Lil Seyada Lil Adalah		2135					
Rami Fanj	North 2 (Tripoli)	SU	Intafid.. Lil Seyada Lil Adalah		5009				Yes	
Hind Al Soufi	North 2 (Tripoli)	SU	Intafid.. Lil Seyada Lil Adalah		1149					Venus symbol
Moustapha Al Owayek	North 2 (Tripoli)	SU	Intafid.. Lil Seyada Lil Adalah		780					
Malik Moulawi	North 2 (Tripoli)	SU	Intafid.. Lil Seyada Lil Adalah	Sabaa	1198					
Kamil Mourani	North 2 (Tripoli)	MA	Intafid.. Lil Seyada Lil Adalah	National Bloc	1724					
Haidar Nasser	North 2 (Tripoli)	AL	Intafid.. Lil Seyada Lil Adalah		313					
Ghaleb Othman	North 2 (Dennieh)	SU	Intafid.. Lil Seyada Lil Adalah		426					
Mohammad Khalil	North 2 (Mennieh)	SU	Intafid.. Lil Seyada Lil Adalah		746					
Iman Darneikah	North 2 (Tripoli)	SU	Inkaz Watan		205					Venus symbol
Faouzi Al Ferri	North 2 (Tripoli)	SU	Inkaz Watan		384					
Amin Bashir	North 2 (Tripoli)	SU	Inkaz Watan		69					
Ashraf Rifi	North 2 (Tripoli)	SU	Inkaz Watan		11593				Yes	
Saleh Al Mokaddam	North 2 (Tripoli)	SU	Inkaz Watan		696					
Elias Al Khoury	North 2 (Tripoli)	MA	Inkaz Watan	Lebanese Forces	3426				Yes	
Jamil Abboud	North 2 (Tripoli)	GO	Inkaz Watan		79				Yes	
Mohammad Shamsine	North 2 (Tripoli)	AL	Inkaz Watan		216					
Ahmad Al Karamah	North 2 (Dennieh)	SU	Inkaz Watan		124					
Bilal Harmoush	North 2 (Dennieh)	SU	Inkaz Watan		6263					
Othman Alameddine	North 2 (Mennieh)	SU	Inkaz Watan		5469					
Moustapha Husein	North 2 (Tripoli)	SU	Tomouh Ah Shabab		9					
Mahmoud Al Mir	North 2 (Tripoli)	SU	Tomouh Ah Shabab		4					
Adnan Bakkour	North 2 (Tripoli)	SU	Tomouh Ah Shabab		18					
Raed Al Tabbaa	North 2 (Dennieh)	SU	Tomouh Ah Shabab		3					
Omar Al Masri	North 2 (Mennieh)	SU	Tomouh Ah Shabab		5					
Mousbah Rajab	North 2 (Tripoli)	SU	Qadreen	MMFD	104					
Abidah Tekriti	North 2 (Tripoli)	SU	Qadreen	MMFD	830					
Mounir Doumani	North 2 (Tripoli)	GO	Qadreen	MMFD	317					
Nidal Abdelrahman	North 2 (Tripoli)	AL	Qadreen	MMFD	26					
Shafic Hassoun	North 2 (Dennieh)	SU	Qadreen	MMFD	186					
Mohammad Zreikah	North 2 (Mennieh)	SU	Qadreen	MMFD	185					
Moustapha Alloush	North 2 (Tripoli)	SU	Loubnan Lana		3730					
Fahed Moukaddam	North 2 (Tripoli)	SU	Loubnan Lana		254					
Rouba Al Dalati	North 2 (Tripoli)	SU	Loubnan Lana		288					Venus symbol
Ali Al Ayoubi	North 2 (Tripoli)	SU	Loubnan Lana		965					
Khaled Merhi	North 2 (Tripoli)	SU	Loubnan Lana		142					
Toni Chahine	North 2 (Tripoli)	MA	Loubnan Lana		77					
Shiban Haykal	North 2 (Tripoli)	GO	Loubnan Lana		31					
Bader Eid	North 2 (Tripoli)	AL	Loubnan Lana		797					
Abdelaziz Al Samad	North 2 (Dennieh)	SU	Loubnan Lana		9151				Yes	
Sami Fatfat	North 2 (Dennieh)	SU	Loubnan Lana		5790					
Ahmad Al Kheir	North 2 (Mennieh)	SU	Loubnan Lana		6100				Yes	
Afraa Eid	North 2 (Tripoli)	SU	Lel Nas	PSP	170					Venus symbol
Alissar Yasn	North 2 (Tripoli)	SU	Lel Nas		270					Venus symbol
Abdelkarim Kabbara	North 2 (Tripoli)	SU	Lel Nas		5023				Yes	
Jalal Al Bakkar	North 2 (Tripoli)	SU	Lel Nas		912					
Wahib Tatar	North 2 (Tripoli)	SU	Lel Nas		166					
Sleiman Obeid	North 2 (Tripoli)	MA	Lel Nas		1409					
Qaysar Khallat	North 2 (Tripoli)	GO	Lel Nas		211					
Ali Darwich	North 2 (Tripoli)	AL	Lel Nas	Azm	831					
Baraa Harmoush	North 2 (Dennieh)	SU	Lel Nas		1642					
Ali Al Aziz	North 2 (Dennieh)	SU	Lel Nas		854					
Kadhim Al Kheir	North 2 (Mennieh)	SU	Lel Nas		4037					
Bilal Shaaban	North 2 (Tripoli)	SU	Fajr Al Teghyeer		323					
Abdelaziz Tartous	North 2 (Tripoli)	SU	Fajr Al Teghyeer		155					
Rabii Al Sabaai	North 2 (Tripoli)	SU	Fajr Al Teghyeer		24					
Anthony Eid	North 2 (Tripoli)	MA	Fajr Al Teghyeer		39					
Hisham Ibrahim	North 2 (Tripoli)	AL	Fajr Al Teghyeer		24					
Mohammad Jabbara	North 2 (Dennieh)	SU	Fajr Al Teghyeer		4					
Mohammad Alamaldeine	North 2 (Mennieh)	SU	Fajr Al Teghyeer		37					
Pierre Raffoul	North 3 (Zgharta)	MA	Rah Nebaa Hon	FPM	2297					
Gebran Bassil	North 3 (Batroun)	MA	Rah Nebaa Hon	FPM	8922				Yes	
Walid Harb	North 3 (Batroun)	MA	Rah Nebaa Hon		324					
Tony Matta	North 3 (Bcharre)	MA	Rah Nebaa Hon		681					
George Atallah	North 3 (Koura)	GO	Rah Nebaa Hon	FPM	2698				Yes	
Walid Al Azar	North 3 (Koura)	GO	Rah Nebaa Hon	SSNP	1427					
Ghassan Karam	North 3 (Koura)	GO	Rah Nebaa Hon	FPM	154					
Tony Al Mardini	North 3 (Zgharta)	MA	Shmel Al Mouwajaha		43					
Michel Mouawad	North 3 (Zgharta)	MA	Shmel Al Mouwajaha	IM	9261				Yes	
Jawad Boulos	North 3 (Zgharta)	MA	Shmel Al Mouwajaha	IM	2035					
Majd Harb	North 3 (Batroun)	MA	Shmel Al Mouwajaha		7076					
Joelle Hoayek	North 3 (Batroun)	MA	Shmel Al Mouwajaha		53					Venus symbol
Rashid Rahme	North 3 (Bcharre)	MA	Shmel Al Mouwajaha		264					
Emile Fayyad	North 3 (Koura)	GO	Shmel Al Mouwajaha		1366					
Adib Abdelmassih	North 3 (Koura)	GO	Shmel Al Mouwajaha	Kataeb	1815				Yes	
Brigette Kheir	North 3 (Koura)	GO	Shmel Al Mouwajaha		95					Venus symbol
Shaden Al Daeef	North 3 (Zgharta)	MA	Shamalouna	Osos	1701					Venus symbol
Michel El Douaihy	North 3 (Zgharta)	MA	Shamalouna	Osos	1768				Yes	
Gistelle Semaan	North 3 (Zgharta)	MA	Shamalouna	National Bloc	686					Venus symbol
Rabih Al Shaer	North 3 (Batroun)	MA	Shamalouna		1955					
Layal Bou Moussa	North 3 (Batroun)	MA	Shamalouna		2058					Venus symbol
Kozhaya Sassine	North 3 (Bcharre)	MA	Shamalouna		155					
Riad Taouk	North 3 (Bcharre)	MA	Shamalouna		1406					
Fadwa Nassif	North 3 (Koura)	GO	Shamalouna		1017					Venus symbol
Jihad Farah	North 3 (Koura)	GO	Shamalouna	Aamieh 17 October	1052					
Semaan Al Bashwati	North 3 (Koura)	GO	Shamalouna		1255					
Maroun Mahfoud	North 3 (Zgharta)	MA	Qadreen Nghayyer	MMFD	169					
Jean Kheirallah	North 3 (Batroun)	MA	Qadreen Nghayyer	MMFD	251					
Mery-Joe Matar	North 3 (Bcharre)	MA	Qadreen Nghayyer	MMFD	64					Venus symbol
Anis Nehmeh	North 3 (Koura)	GO	Qadreen Nghayyer	LCP	326					
Zeina Al Nabti	North 3 (Koura)	GO	Qadreen Nghayyer	MMFD	47					Venus symbol
Bassem Sneige	North 3 (Koura)	GO	Qadreen Nghayyer	MMFD	19					
Carol Dahdah	North 3 (Zgharta)	MA	Laehat Wehdat Al Shimal	Marada	510					Venus symbol
Tony Frangieh	North 3 (Zgharta)	MA	Laehat Wehdat Al Shimal	Marada	8945				Yes	
Estefan El Douaihy	North 3 (Zgharta)	MA	Laehat Wehdat Al Shimal	Marada	4320					
Joseph Najm	North 3 (Batroun)	MA	Laehat Wehdat Al Shimal	Marada	1908					
Melhem Taouk	North 3 (Bcharre)	MA	Laehat Wehdat Al Shimal		3566				Yes	
Roy Al Khoury	North 3 (Bcharre)	MA	Laehat Wehdat Al Shimal		16					
Fadi Ghosn	North 3 (Koura)	GO	Laehat Wehdat Al Shimal		3695					
Salim Saadeh	North 3 (Koura)	GO	Laehat Wehdat Al Shimal	SSNP	2836					
Maggie Toubia	North 3 (Zgharta)	MA	Nabad Al Jomhoureyya Al Kaweyya		89					Venus symbol
Fouad Boulos	North 3 (Zgharta)	MA	Nabad Al Jomhoureyya Al Kaweyya		53					
Mikhael El Douaihy	North 3 (Zgharta)	MA	Nabad Al Jomhoureyya Al Kaweyya		3849					
Ghayyath Yazbek	North 3 (Batroun)	MA	Nabad Al Jomhoureyya Al Kaweyya	Lebanese Forces	11094				Yes	
Layal Nehmeh	North 3 (Batroun)	MA	Nabad Al Jomhoureyya Al Kaweyya		129					Venus symbol
Sethrida Taouk	North 3 (Bcharre)	MA	Nabad Al Jomhoureyya Al Kaweyya	Lebanese Forces	7924				Yes	Venus symbol
Joseph Isaak	North 3 (Bcharre)	MA	Nabad Al Jomhoureyya Al Kaweyya	Lebanese Forces	6391					
Fadi Karam	North 3 (Koura)	GO	Nabad Al Jomhoureyya Al Kaweyya	Lebanese Forces	9226				Yes	
Sami Rihana	North 3 (Koura)	GO	Nabad Al Jomhoureyya Al Kaweyya		153					
Rami Salloum	North 3 (Koura)	GO	Nabad Al Jomhoureyya Al Kaweyya		98					
Antoine Yammine	North 3 (Zgharta)	MA	Waai Sawtak		36					
Mirna Hanna	North 3 (Batroun)	MA	Waai Sawtak		24					Venus symbol
George Boutros	North 3 (Bcharre)	MA	Waai Sawtak		23					
Moussa Loukka	North 3 (Koura)	GO	Waai Sawtak		24					
Bassam Ghantous	North 3 (Koura)	GO	Waai Sawtak		50					
Nabil Zaatari	South 1 (Saida)	SU	Al Ihtidal Kouwatuna		3242					
Ibrahim Azar	South 1 (Jezzine)	MA	Al Ihtidal Kouwatuna	Amal	7894					
Yousif Skaff	South 1 (Jezzine)	GC	Al Ihtidal Kouwatuna		108					
Mohammad Al Tahera	South 1 (Saida)	SU	Sawt Al Taghyeer		136					
Rana Al Tawil	South 1 (Saida)	SU	Sawt Al Taghyeer		79					Venus symbol
Joseph Metri	South 1 (Jezzine)	GC	Sawt Al Taghyeer		82					
Ismael Hafooda	South 1 (Saida)	SU	Qadreen		40					
Ahmad Al Assi	South 1 (Saida)	SU	Qadreen	MMFD	338					
Elie Abou Tas	South 1 (Jezzine)	MA	Qadreen	MMFD	442					
Emilio Mattar	South 1 (Jezzine)	MA	Qadreen	MMFD	210					
Mohammad Al Kawas	South 1 (Saida)	SU	Maan Li Saida Wa Jezzine		165					
Ali Al Sheikh Ammar	South 1 (Saida)	SU	Maan Li Saida Wa Jezzine		77					
Amal Abou Zeid	South 1 (Jezzine)	MA	Maan Li Saida Wa Jezzine	FPM	5184					
Ziad Aswad	South 1 (Jezzine)	MA	Maan Li Saida Wa Jezzine	FPM	3639					
Salim Al Khoury	South 1 (Jezzine)	GC	Maan Li Saida Wa Jezzine	FPM	447					
Hania Al Zaatari	South 1 (Saida)	SU	Nahnu Al Taghyeer	Beirut Madinati	3028					Venus symbol
Mohammad Al Zarif	South 1 (Saida)	SU	Nahnu Al Taghyeer		369					
Sleiman Al Malek	South 1 (Jezzine)	MA	Nahnu Al Taghyeer		424					
Joseph Al Asmar	South 1 (Jezzine)	MA	Nahnu Al Taghyeer	Kataeb	570					
Robert Al Khoury	South 1 (Jezzine)	GC	Nahnu Al Taghyeer		309					
Abdelrahman Al Bizri	South 1 (Saida)	SU	Nantakheb Lil Taghyeer		8526				Yes	
Oussama Saad Al Masri	South 1 (Saida)	SU	Nantakheb Lil Taghyeer	PNO	7341				Yes	
Kamil Serhal	South 1 (Jezzine)	MA	Nantakheb Lil Taghyeer		795					
Charbel Masaad	South 1 (Jezzine)	MA	Nantakheb Lil Taghyeer		984				Yes	
Jamil Dagher	South 1 (Jezzine)	GC	Nantakheb Lil Taghyeer		382					
Yousif Al Nakeeb	South 1 (Saida)	SU	Wahdatna Fi Saida wa Jezzine		4380					
Wissam Al Tawil	South 1 (Jezzine)	MA	Wahdatna Fi Saida wa Jezzine		108					
Said Al Asmar	South 1 (Jezzine)	MA	Wahdatna Fi Saida wa Jezzine	Lebanese Forces	1102				Yes	
Ghada Ayoub	South 1 (Jezzine)	GC	Wahdatna Fi Saida wa Jezzine	Lebanese Forces	7953				Yes	Venus symbol
Inaya Ezzedine	South 2 (Tyre)	SH	Al Amal Wal Wafaa	Amal	15266				Yes	Venus symbol
Hussein Jeshi	South 2 (Tyre)	SH	Al Amal Wal Wafaa	Hezbollah	27416				Yes	
Hasan Ezzedine	South 2 (Tyre)	SH	Al Amal Wal Wafaa	Hezbollah	27927				Yes	
Ali Khreis	South 2 (Tyre)	SH	Al Amal Wal Wafaa	Amal	16964				Yes	
Ali Osserian	South 2 (Zahrani)	SH	Al Amal Wal Wafaa	Amal	2294				Yes	
Nabih Berri	South 2 (Zahrani)	SH	Al Amal Wal Wafaa	Amal	42091				Yes	
Michel Moussa	South 2 (Zahrani)	GC	Al Amal Wal Wafaa		1364				Yes	
Hasan Khalil	South 2 (Tyre)	SH	Al Dawla Al Hadina		816					
Bushra Khalil	South 2 (Tyre)	SH	Al Dawla Al Hadina		2476					Venus symbol
Yousif Khalifeh	South 2 (Zahrani)	SH	Al Dawla Al Hadina		709					
Riad Al Assaad	South 2 (Zahrani)	SH	Al Dawla Al Hadina		1945					
Daoud Faraj	South 2 (Tyre)	SH	Al Karar Al Horr		320					
Kassem Daoud	South 2 (Tyre)	SH	Al Karar Al Horr		208					
Robert Kanaan	South 2 (Zahrani)	GC	Al Karar Al Horr	Lebanese Forces	4238					
Hatem Halawi	South 2 (Tyre)	SH	Maan Lil Taghyeer		1649					
Mohammad Ayoub	South 2 (Tyre)	SH	Maan Lil Taghyeer	LCP	195					
Sara Soueidan	South 2 (Tyre)	SH	Maan Lil Taghyeer		834					Venus symbol
Roaa Al Fares	South 2 (Tyre)	SH	Maan Lil Taghyeer	MMFD	1088					Venus symbol
Ali Khalifeh	South 2 (Zahrani)	SH	Maan Lil Taghyeer	Mada	595					
Aiman Mrouweh	South 2 (Zahrani)	SH	Maan Lil Taghyeer	LCP	656					
Hisham Hayek	South 2 (Zahrani)	GC	Maan Lil Taghyeer		3987					
Mohammad Raad	South 3 (Nabatieh)	SH	Al Amal Wal Wafaa	Hezbollah	48543				Yes	
Hani Kobeissi	South 3 (Nabatieh)	SH	Al Amal Wal Wafaa	Amal	20195				Yes	
Nasser Jaber	South 3 (Nabatieh)	SH	Al Amal Wal Wafaa	Amal	6236				Yes	
Ashraf Baydoun	South 3 (Bint Jbeil)	SH	Al Amal Wal Wafaa	Amal	10540				Yes	
Ayoub Hmayid	South 3 (Bint Jbeil)	SH	Al Amal Wal Wafaa	Amal	6745				Yes	
Hasan Fadlallah	South 3 (Bint Jbeil)	SH	Al Amal Wal Wafaa	Hezbollah	43324				Yes	
Ali Hasan Khalil	South 3 (Marjaayoun+Hasbaya)	SH	Al Amal Wal Wafaa	Amal	13155				Yes	
Ali Fayyad	South 3 (Marjaayoun+Hasbaya)	SH	Al Amal Wal Wafaa	Hezbollah	37047				Yes	
Kassem Hachem	South 3 (Marjaayoun+Hasbaya)	SU	Al Amal Wal Wafaa	Ba'ath	1215				Yes	
Marwan Kheireddine	South 3 (Marjaayoun+Hasbaya)	DR	Al Amal Wal Wafaa	LDP	2634					
Asaad Herdan	South 3 (Marjaayoun+Hasbaya)	GO	Al Amal Wal Wafaa	SSNP	1859					
Mahmoud Shaib	South 3 (Nabatieh)	SH	Sawt Al Janoub		48					
Hussein Al Shaer	South 3 (Bint Jbeil)	SH	Sawt Al Janoub		192					
Abbass Sharafeddine	South 3 (Marjaayoun+Hasbaya)	SH	Sawt Al Janoub		74					
Riad Issa	South 3 (Marjaayoun+Hasbaya)	SU	Sawt Al Janoub		18					
Karim Hamdan	South 3 (Marjaayoun+Hasbaya)	DR	Sawt Al Janoub		7					
Wassim Ghandour	South 3 (Nabatieh)	SH	Maan Nahwa Al Taghyeer	Beirut Madinati	2206					
Ali Wehbi	South 3 (Nabatieh)	SH	Maan Nahwa Al Taghyeer	Sabaa	1806					
Wafik Rihan	South 3 (Nabatieh)	SH	Maan Nahwa Al Taghyeer	LCP	3071					
Khalil Theeb	South 3 (Bint Jbeil)	SH	Maan Nahwa Al Taghyeer	LCP	417					
Hasan Bazzi	South 3 (Bint Jbeil)	SH	Maan Nahwa Al Taghyeer		1354					
Ali Mrad	South 3 (Bint Jbeil)	SH	Maan Nahwa Al Taghyeer	Aamieh 17 October	2960					
Nizar Rammal	South 3 (Marjaayoun+Hasbaya)	SH	Maan Nahwa Al Taghyeer	MMFD	465					
Ibrahim Abdallah	South 3 (Marjaayoun+Hasbaya)	SH	Maan Nahwa Al Taghyeer	MMFD	651					
Mohammad Kaadan	South 3 (Marjaayoun+Hasbaya)	SU	Maan Nahwa Al Taghyeer		1059					
Firas Hamdan	South 3 (Marjaayoun+Hasbaya)	DR	Maan Nahwa Al Taghyeer		4859				Yes	
Elias Jarada	South 3 (Marjaayoun+Hasbaya)	GO	Maan Nahwa Al Taghyeer	Al-Tali'a	9218				Yes	
