= Ghosn =

Ghosn is a surname. Notable people with the surname include:

- Carlos Ghosn (born 1954), businessman and automotive executive
- Caroline Ghosn (born 1987), American businesswoman
- Fadi Ghosn (born 1979), Lebanese footballer
- Fayez Ghosn (1950–2021), Lebanese politician
- Maguy Bou Ghosn (born 1977), Lebanese actress
- Jad Ghosn (born 1986), Lebanese journalist
- Nicolas Ghosn (1940–2018), Lebanese politician and lawyer
- Tiki Ghosn (born 1977), Lebanese-born American mixed martial artist
