= Ain el-Rihaneh =

Ain el-Rihaneh عين الريحانة Ain er_Rihaneh
- Municipality
- Location in Lebanon
- Coordinates: 33°55′7″N 35°41′15″E
- Country: Lebanon
- Governorate: Keserwan-Jbeil
- District: Keserwan
- Established: 1981

Government
  - Type: Independent
  - Mayor: Vincent Raymond el Boustany

Area
  - Total: 20.0 km^{2} (7.7 sq mi)
- Elevation: 340 m (1,120 ft)

Population (2016)
  - Total: 4,000
- Time zone: UTC+2 (EET)
  - Summer (DST): UTC+3 (EEST)
- Website: http://www.ainelrihane.com/

Ain el-Rihaneh (Levantine Arabic: عين الريحانة, romanized: ʿAyn al-Rīḥāneh; also spelled Ayn al-Rihanah or Aain er-Rihane) is a town and municipality located in the Keserwan District of the Keserwan-Jbeil Governorate of Lebanon. The town is about 21 kilometres (13 mi) north of Beirut. It has an average elevation of 340 meters above sea level and a total land area of 2000 hectares. Ain el-Rihaneh's inhabitants are Maronites. The village contained two private schools enrolling a total of 201 students as of 2006.

== Religion ==
Ain er-Rihaneh Monastery of St John the Baptist - Hrach

Some Historical Milestones for the Sisters of St. John the Baptist – Hrach

Monasteries began to flourish in Kesrouan in the seventeenth century. Some families took the initiative to build monasteries based on the spirituality of St. Anthony the Great. In 1642 and by a personal initiative, the Bishop Youssef Al Akoury purchased the land of Hrach, This monastery was the first one dedicated to nuns among Kesrouan Upon the election of Youssef Al Akoury as a patriarch (1644-1648), he elected his domicile in the monastery of St. John the Baptist – Hrach instead of the monastery of Qannoubine. He held in this monastery Hrach a synod in December 5, 1644 in order to fix some sales habits. The nuns lived in that monastery for eighty three years under the custody of the bishop Abdullah Qaraali at the end of July 1725.

The Lebanese Council of 1736 recommended that nuns’ monasteries follow the monastic law set by the bishop Abdullah Qaraali for the nuns of the monastery of St. John the Baptist – Hrach.

Furthermore, the bishop Abdullah Qaraali was serious purchasing numerous lands neighboring the aforementioned monastery in order to establish a natural and fixed fortress for the monastery maintaining thereby the sanctity of the nuns’ secluded life away from all contact with the world.

The bishop Abdullah created the monastic council in the monastery of St. John the Baptist that he opened during the synod held on August 15, 1739. similarly adopted by the rest of the nuns’ monastic orders.

The bishop Abdullah living in the monastery of Hrach for a period of sixteen years (1725 – 1742) monastery church, the Church of Our Lady the Transition.

the monastery was held by the bishop Germanos Sakr (1744 – 1753), Bishop Mikhael Fadel (1758 – 1793) who became later a Patriarch (1793 – 1795) Bishop Mikhael Fadel (1796 – 1819). the monastery of Hrach was characterized to be a center for the residence of the bishops until the Louaize synod (1818) stipulated that the bishops must live inside their dioceses.

In 1948, the Patriarch Antoine Arida (1932 – 1955) gave the permission to the nuns to start the educational message. in 1966, the nuns built St. John the Baptist School in Ain el Rihane where a legal monastic group was assigned which goal is the educational message while preserving the spirit of seclusion and monastic life.

St. John the Baptist monastic order includes today 35 nuns distributed on the following centers: • The monastery of St. John the Baptist – the mother monastery (Ain el Rihane – Kesrouan) • The novices monastery (Ain el Rihane – Kesrouan) • St. John the Baptist School (Ain el Rihane – Kesrouan) • Feytroun monastery (on completion of the restoration phase) • Message in the educational and pastoral frame in Daher Safra – Syria Ain El Rihaneh encompasses four churches, the church of our lady of salvation. There is also another church located directly in front of the new one. The fourth and last church is st Joseph of the apparition, but the eldest church is church of our lady of salvation.

== Historical Background and contents ==
The Village accommodates the first monastery for the Legal Sisters in the Maronite community, the monastery of John the Baptist – Hrach, which includes an elementary and boarding public school. Moreover, it hosts Sesobel which is considered as one of the top humanitarian associations in the country, in addition to Ain el-Rihaneh Club Association that is responsible for all sporting and cultural activities and the Consulate of the Republic of Togo.

== Famous Decedents ==
Ain el-Rihaneh is the birthplace of book writer and television celebrity star Karen Boustany who has published novels, among them being ( Mon pẽre le Roi du Monde ) translating My father the King of the World. Karen is also the host and producer of her own television show Asmaa min al tarikh on Lebanese Broadcasting Corporation International and LDC.
