= Salim Jreissati =

Lebanese lawyer and politician (born 1952)

State Minister for Presidential Affairs
- In office 31 January 2019 – 21 January 2020
- Prime Minister: Saad Hariri
- Preceded by: Pierre Raffoul

Minister of Justice
- In office 18 December 2016 – 31 January 2019
- Prime Minister: Saad Hariri
- Preceded by: Ashraf Rifi
- Succeeded by: Albert Serhan

Minister of Labor
- In office 24 February 2012 – 15 February 2014
- Prime Minister: Najib Mikati
- Preceded by: Charbel Nahas
- Succeeded by: Sejaan Azzi

Personal details
- Born: 4 April 1952 (age 74)
- Education: American University of Beirut

Salim Jreissati (born 4 April 1952) is a lawyer and politician. He served as Lebanon's minister of labor between 2012 and February 2014. From 18 December 2016 to 31 January 2019 he was the minister of justice. On 31 January 2019 he was named state minister for presidential affairs which he held until January 2020.

== Early life and education ==
Jreissati's family is from Zahle, east Lebanon. He was born there on 4 April 1952. He graduated from the Saint Joseph University with a bachelor's degree in 1976. He received both the Lebanese and French degrees in law, and a high degree in private law.

== Career ==
Jreissati is a former member of the Constitutional Council. He became a registered member of the Beirut Bar Association on 8 November 1974. In 1976, he began to work at Saint Joseph University as a lecturer. He is the former member of the Lebanese Constitutional Council (1977–2009). He served at the Special Tribunal for Lebanon (STL) as a legal advisor for the defence team of four Hezbollah members, including Mustafa Badreddine, who were allegedly involved in the assassination of former Prime Minister Rafik Hariri. In 2010, Jressati was one of the legal advisors who contributed to the drafting of the new Syrian constitution. In addition, he served as an adviser to former president Emile Lahoud. He was appointed labor minister in Najib Mikati's cabinet on 24 February 2012, replacing Charbel Nahas in the post. Jreissati was nominated by the Free Patriotic Movement leader and member of parliament Michel Aoun. After his appointment, Aoun announced that Jreissati became a member of the Change and Reform bloc, represented by ten ministers in the cabinet composed of thirty ministers. Jreissati's term ended on 15 February when Sejaan Azzi was appointed labor minister.

On 18 December 2016 Jreissati was named the minister of justice in the cabinet led by Prime Minister Saad Hariri. He was in the post until 31 January 2019 when he was named the state minister for presidential affairs. Jreissati was in office until January 2020.

=== Business activities ===
From 1993 to 1997 Jreissati was a member of the directors' board of At Tamwil Bank. In 2008, he was named as a member of the board of directors of Emirates Lebanon bank.

== Personal life ==
Jreissati is married and has three children.
