= Jad Ghosn =

Lebanese journalist reporter

- جاد غصن
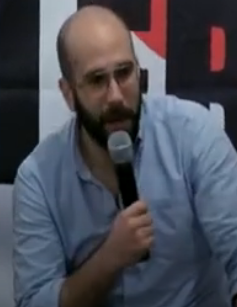
- Ghosn in 2019
- Born: 26 August 1986 (age 40); Jounieh, Lebanon
- Education: American University of Beirut
- Occupations: Journalist; news reporter

Jad Ghosn (Arabic: جاد غصن; born 23 August 1986) is a Lebanese left-leaning journalist and news reporter. He worked for OTV from 2012 to 2013 and Al Jadeed from 2013 to 2020.

In 2020, he signed a contract with Saudi-owned Asharq tv channel, but he was discharged because of older comments criticizing the Saudi government and the House of Saud. He has been working since then independently on his YouTube channel.

On 8 March 2022, Jad Ghosn announced his candidacy for one of the Maronite seats in Mount Lebanon II - Metn, running as a candidate of Citizens in a State. He lost the Lebanese parliamentary elections to the Lebanese Forces candidate Razi El Hage. Ghosn appealed to the Constitutional Council against El Hage but was rejected.
