= Karen Boustany =

Lebanese media personality

Karen R. Boustany
- Born: Karen Beatrice Boustany; June 4, 1978 (age 47); Ain el-Rihaneh, keserwan, Lebanon.
- Occupations: Public Figure; Author; Director; Businesswoman; Television personality
- Awards: 7
- Website: karenboustany.com

Karen Boustany (born June 4, 1978), known professionally as Karen R. Boustany, is a Lebanese international Media Personality, Author, Businesswoman, Director & Producer.

== Life ==
Born in Ain El Rihane, a village in Mount Lebanon, Karen Boustany studied at St Joseph – Antoura College where she started writing poetry at a very early age. She consecrated all her free time to writing, She traveled to Paris where she attained her BA in French Literature from La Sorbonne University, Paris. She graduated also from the Lebanese American University in Byblos (LAU), specialising in a double major: Communication Arts and Political Sciences. Having acquired 12 years of experience in advertising, she established in 2005 her own advertising and marketing company “Eyestrategy Business Communication sarl”, conciliating literature, know-how and Creativity. For two consecutive years, she had her own socio-political column, ”Poing à la ligne”, in Al Baladnewspaper in its French publication.

In April 2009 and with the reopening of the Lebanese TV channel MTV (Lebanon), Karen prepared and animated a daily live cultural show: Kitab. She presented and analysed new books releases, best sellers, interviewed Lebanese and international authors in the studio or through Skype. she is the first TV presenter to use this technology in a cultural show. She has received more than 1800 writers from which 250 international writers such as the great Lebanese French writer Amin Maalouf as well as the best-selling writer in the world Marc Levy and others. From 2010 until 2013, Karen covered the Salon du Livre Francophone in Beirut hosting more than 80 writers each year in less than ten days. On May 16, 2012 Karen Boustany started a new show, "écrire l'Histoire", in which she hosted famous international personalities of the 21st century. International writers like Marc Levy, Eric-Emmanuel Schmitt, Venus Khoury-Ghata and Amin Maalouf. On April 6, 2013 she started Ecrire l'Histoire Season 2 from Detroit, Los Angeles and Hollywood with personalities from Lebanese Origins. Film makers, film directors and film producers, as well as music compositors, writers, politicians and CEOs are interviewed in the USA and Paris such as Mr. Carlos Ghosn, CEO of Nissan and Renault worldwide and Dr Charles El Achi, Director of JPL Nasa in LA.

In February 2014, she started a new TV series on LBCI Asmaa Min al Tarikh that she produces and presents, and in which she hosted very famous Brazilian personalities from Lebanese descent such as President of Brazil HE Michel Temer. Since, it has become a trade mark worldwide. In 2015, she traveled to UAE and film more than 15 episodes with outstanding Lebanese success stories in Dubai, Abu Dhabi and Sharjah. In October 2016, she traveled to Australia and film more than 12 interviews with prominent Lebanese politicians and businessmen such as Former Premiere of Victoria HE Steve Brax. In February 2017, she traveled to South Africa and film more than 35 interviews with prominent Lebanese politicians and businessmen in Africa during the Lebanese Diaspora Energy. Since 2014, Karen is a founding member of the Lebanese Energy Diaspora Conference organised by the Ministry of Foreign Affairs and Immigration. This conference takes place in Beirut each year in May or June and features more than 5000 Lebanese successful expats. In May 2017 she was the master of Ceremony of the Lebanese Diaspora Energy Conference in Beirut in the presence of HE President Michel Aoun and the Prime Minister Saad Hariri as well as all Lebanese ministers, deputies, ambassadors and 5000 VIP Lebanese expats. A great event that was covered live by all Lebanese channels. In September 2018, Karen Boustany filmed her 8th season of Asmaa Min Al Tarikh in Las Vegas and San Francisco with pioneers in the ICT field. In November 2018, she represented Lebanon amongst 35 countries in Madrid during 'Les Jeunes Du Monde Unis" Forum where she was a guest of honor and moderator. In June 2019, Karen Boustany represented Lebanon amongst 42 countries in The International Business Forum Portugal as a speaker talking about sustainable business and women entrepreneurship. She was rewarded for her successful career. on July 6, 2019, Karen Boustany was appointed CEO of The Luxury Network in Lebanon.

== Books ==
Karen has published two books: a poetry book "Au-delà de la Faute" published in December 2007 and "Mon père le Roi du monde", an homage to her father Raymond published in November 2012. She is preparing her third book, which will be full of true stories and another one about her mother, who died recently.

== Founding of Als Lebanon ==
In June 2015, she co-founded and presides the Lebanese ALS association, first ALS Association in the Arab World. the LALS takes care of ALS patients in Lebanon medically, financially, psychologically and socially. Karen organised many activities in Lebanon and Dubai for fundraising and to spread awareness. With the support of Notre Dame University NDU she produces a movie about Dr Jamil Zogheib founder of the LALS, paediatrician and ALS patient who wrote 10 books with his eyes.

== Awards ==
- Asmaa Min Al Tarikh Best TV Show for 2016-2017 by the Beirut Golden Awards.
- Best media Personality Lebanon 2017
- Media Ambassador to the Lebanese Diaspora - Ministry of Tourism
- Award for her achievements with the Lebanese Diaspora - Ministry of Foreign Affairs
