= Hrach =

Hrach (Armenian: Հրաչ), also spelled Hratch or Herach, is an Armenian male given name meaning "eyes of flame." Origin is Hrachia or Hrachya (Armenian: Հրաչյա). Notable people with the name include:

== Given name ==
- Hrachia Adjarian (1876–1953), Armenian linguist
- Hrach Bartikyan (1927–2011), Armenian academic
- Hrachya Harutyunyan (born 1961), Armenian actor
- Hrach Hovhannisyan (born 1987), Armenian Greco-Roman wrestler
- Hrach Kaprielian (born 1953), Armenian-American businessman and philanthropist
- Hrachya Keshishyan (born 1970), Armenian film director
- Hrachya Margaryan (born 1999), Armenian wrestler
- Hrach Martirosyan (born 1964), Armenian linguist
- Hrachya Melikyan (1947–2006), Armenian music composer and film composer
- Hrach Muradyan (born 1983), Armenian TV host, producer and public figure
- Hrachia Nersisyan (1895–1961), Armenian actor
- Hrachya Poladian (born 1971), Armenian diplomat
- Hrachya Petikyan (born 1960), Armenian sportshooter
- Hrachya Qochar (1910–1965), Armenian writer, publicist, prizewinner of Armenian SSR
- Hrachya Sargsyan (born 1985), Armenian politician
- Haig "Hrach" Tiriakian (1871–1915), Armenian politician
- Hrach Titizian (born 1979), American actor
- Hratch Zadourian (born 1969), Lebanese cyclist
- Charles Herach Papas (1918–2007), American electrical engineer and academic

== Surname ==
- Azniv Hrachia (1853 or 1859 – 1920), Ottoman Armenian actress

== Fictional characters ==
- Hrach, fictional character in The Shield
