= Charbel Nahas =

Lebanese academic and politician (born 1954)

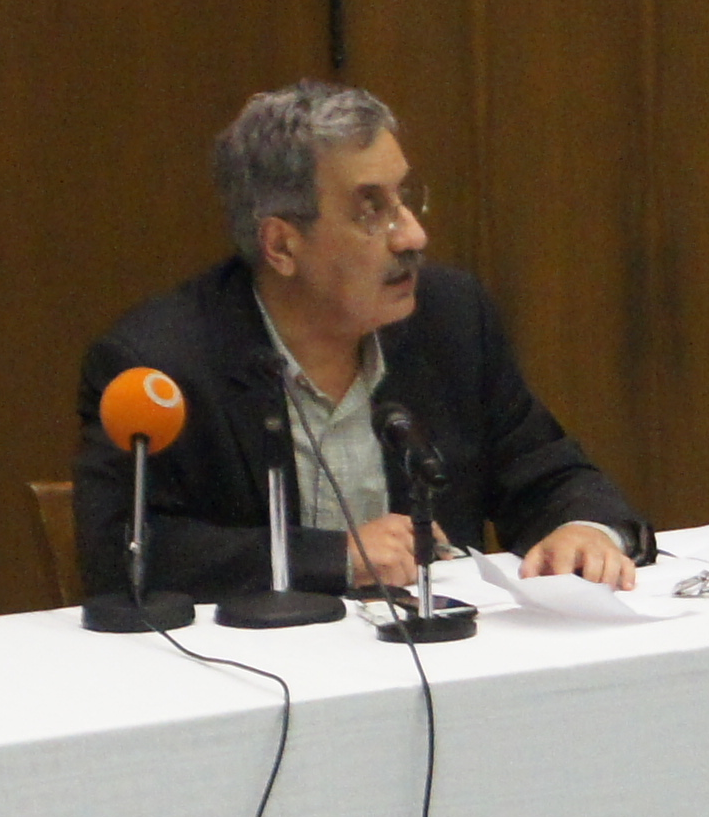

Leader of Citizens in a State
- Incumbent
- Assumed office 24 March 2016
- Preceded by: Office established

Minister of Labour
- In office 13 June 2011 – February 2012
- Prime Minister: Najib Mikati
- Preceded by: Boutros Harb
- Succeeded by: Salim Jreissati

Minister of Telecommunications
- In office 9 November 2009 – 13 June 2011
- Prime Minister: Saad Hariri
- Preceded by: Gebran Bassil
- Succeeded by: Nicolas Sehnaoui

Personal details
- Born: 16 August 1954 (age 72) Beirut, Lebanon
- Party: Citizens in a State (since 2016)
- Education: Ecole Polytechnique; Ecole Nationale des Ponts et Chaussées
- Website: charbelnahas.org

Charbel Nahas (Arabic: شربل نحاس; born 16 August 1954) is a Lebanese politician, economist and engineer who is the General Secretary of Citizens in a State, a political party that was established in 2016 and that has as its goal to create "a civil, democratic, fair and capable state". He is widely considered to be a Lebanese progressive whose priority has been to improve living conditions for the country's disenfranchised poor.

Nahas served as labour minister in Najib Mikati's second government as one of eleven Change and Reform ministers, led by Michel Aoun. He resigned on 22 February 2012, arguing that all of his colleagues in government were preventing any effective improvement in workers' rights.

== Early life and education ==
Charbel Nahas was born in Beirut on 16 August 1954 into a Melkite Christian family. He graduated from the Ecole Polytechnique in Paris in 1976, and from the Ecole Nationale des Ponts et Chaussées, also in Paris, in 1978. He also received a PhD in social anthropology in 1980.

== Professional career ==
=== Academic career ===
Nahas was a professor at the Lebanese University for 12 years, where he headed the Civil Engineering Department. Nahas has also served as Distinguished Practitioner of Public Policy-in Residence at the American University of Beirut. Much of his work has centred around Lebanon's macroeconomic situation, in particular its sovereign debt, which Nahas has maintained is unsustainable. He is also the author of A Socioeconomic Programme for Lebanon, which was published by the Lebanese Center for Policy Studies in March 2006.

=== Other ===
Nahas is a leading social anthropologist and the author of many publications and studies on the Lebanese economy. He has acted as an expert for a number of Lebanese state institutions, as well as many international organisations, including the World Bank and the United Nations. Nahas was in charge of the reconstruction of Beirut Central District from 1982 to 1986. Nahas has contributed to development in areas including policy formation and public administration in Syria, Jordan, Saudi Arabia and Iraq, amongst others.

== Political career ==
=== Minister of Telecommunications ===
In November 2009, Nahas was appointed minister of telecommunications in the government headed by Saad Hariri. Several commentators at the time hailed Nahas' appointment as a victory for Lebanese progressives. Sources indicated that one of the factors that led the FPM to nominate Nahas was to participate in ongoing discussions in relation to the annual state budget and the national debt, which are priority issues for the FPM. In 2006, Nahas wrote that "[a]lthough most of the rest of the world has moved on from the attitude that had been prevalent in the 1990s, according to which privatisation was the solution to all problems relating to public finance, Lebanon still adheres to that old mentality, either as a result of intellectual laziness or opportunism. [...] What we need in Lebanon is a 'better state', and not a 'lesser state'." Subsequent reports indicate that Nahas supports the part-privatization of the telecom sector to a consortium of companies while ensuring that the government and the Lebanese public retains a stake. On 11 December 2009, Nahas announced that his ministry plans to create facilities to provide at least 90% of regions in Lebanon with broadband internet access.

In November 2009, Nahas was appointed to the committee responsible for drafting the new government's policy statement. In the committee's first meeting, he called for Lebanon's economic system to be reformed, saying that "it is outdated. The Taef Agreement did not meet the requirements needed." During the summer of 2010, Nahas raised a number of objections in cabinet meetings to the draft budget law that was proposed by Finance Minister Raya Haffar al-Hassan. In particular, he objected to what he described as the proposed law's failure to address Lebanon's basic economic difficulties (which manifested themselves in the form of high unemployment and emigration) at a time of relatively favorable circumstances (including a spectacular increase in capital in-flows since 2008). Nahas proposed a number of changes to the draft budget law that would reduce the burdens on employment and on income, as well as increased investment in a modern public transport system in Lebanon. He has also insisted on a number of methodological changes, including the elimination of all off-balance sheet expenses. The draft budget law was eventually approved by the Cabinet, including by Nahas, on 19 June 2010. Nahas subsequently led efforts to investigate and dismantle an alleged Israeli espionage operation which had infiltrated the Lebanese telecommunications network. Ashraf Rifi, then a general in the Internal Security Forces, prevented Nahas from accessing the facility. Rifi ignored then Minister of Interior Ziad Baroud instructions to allow Nahas to access the facility, prompting Baroud to resign.

As minister of telecommunications, Nahas set as one of his goals to modernise the Lebanese telecom sector, which at the time was ranked as amongst the least competitive and the least developed in the world. During Nahas' tenure, a number of measures to reduce the cost of mobile phones for less advantaged citizens were introduced. Amongst other things, the cost of purchasing a prepaid mobile phone line was reduced from $100 to $25, a collect call mechanism was introduced, as was a "family and friends" measure, which reduced prices for prepaid cellphone subscribers.

=== Minister of Labour ===
In June 2011, Nahas was appointed Lebanese minister of labour in the second government headed by Najib Mikati. Miqati is rumored to have vetoed Nahas' reappointment as Minister of Telecommunications. In his new position, Nahas focused on improving the rights of foreign domestic workers, on increasing the minimum wage in Lebanon and on granting health care to all Lebanese citizens. He argued that such measures are necessary to achieve greater social justice in Lebanon.

Nahas put together a reform package during the fall of 2011, which had as its objective to ensure periodic adjustment of wages, in accordance with the legislation that is already in force, to redistribute revenue from rentier to productive services (by increasing taxes on real estate transactions), and to reinvigorate the role of the unions. Nahas' proposal included creating the basis for universal health care in Lebanon. That package was rejected by the Council of Ministries, a majority of which voted in favor of a plan put forward by Prime Minister Najib Mikati. Determined to see his plan come to fruition, Nahas referred the government's decision to the Lebanese Shoura Council, an administrative court, with a view to examining the decision's legality. The Council found in October 2011 that the government's decision was illegal given that it was not based on existing legislation. In December 2011, Nahas put forth his proposal to the Council of Ministries again, but Mikati once again put forth a proposal of his own. Even though Nahas won the vote this time, the Shoura Council rejected his proposal as it did Mikati's earlier proposal, on the grounds that as a Labour minister Nahas had no legal right to add transportation expenses to the minimum wage. Lebanon's General Labour Confederation threatened to organise its largest strike in history in reaction to the government's decision.

In January 2012, the Council of Ministries approved two separate decrees relating to wage increases, over Nahas' objections. The first provided for a modest increase in the actual minimum wage, and the second reconfirmed the transportation allowance. Nahas refused to sign the second decree on the basis that it was in violation of the law and amounted to theft of workers' pension rights. In response, Prime Minister Mikati announced that he would refrain from calling the Council of Ministries into session until the second decree was signed. After significant pressure, including from his own political bloc, to sign the decree, Nahas opted to resign on 21 February 2012 rather than sign the decree. On 24 February 2012, Salim Jreissati, another nomination by Aoun, replaced him as labor minister.

=== Citizens in a State ===
In 2016, Nahas led the establishment of Citizens in a State, a new political party which has as its objective to establish a civil, non-sectarian state in Lebanon. He is currently its Secretary General. Since the 2019 popular uprising, Nahas and Citizens in a State have been leading organised political action against Lebanon's current ruling elite.

Nahas and his party has been criticised for allegedly being pro-Hezbollah.

=== MP candidacy ===
In the 2018 Lebanese general election, Nahas ran for the catholic seat in Mount Lebanon II - Metn district but lost to the FPM candidate Edy Maalouf.

In the 2022 Lebanese general election, Nahas ran for the catholic seat in Beirut I - Achrafieh but lost to the FPM candidate Nicolas Sehnaoui.

== Selected bibliography ==
- Nahas, Charbel (1999). حظوظ اجتناب الأزمة وشروط تخطيها، سيرة تجربة في الإصلاح. Beirut, Lebanon: Neel wa Furat.
- Nahas, Charbel (2006). A socioeconomic programme for Lebanon. Beirut, Lebanon: The Lebanese Center for Policy Studies. ISBN 1-886604-59-2.
- Nahas, Charbel (2019). "Speech: Alternatives to a defunct regime". Beirut, Lebanon: Citizens in a State.
- Nahas, Charbel (2020). "Article: Crise, choix et priorités". Beirut, Lebanon: Commerce du Levant.
- Nahas, Charbel (2020). An Economy and a State for Lebanon. Beirut, Lebanon:

Political offices
Preceded by Gebran Bassil	Minister of Telecommunications (Lebanon); 2009-2011	Succeeded by Nicolas Sehnaoui
