= Bilal Abdallah Alayli =

Lebanese academic and scholar

- Born: 10 April 1949 (age 77); Beirut, Lebanon
- Education: Lebanese University
- Occupations: Academic and scholar

Bilal Abdallah Alayli is a Lebanese academic and scholar. He became president of the Order of Engineers and Architects in Beirut in 2008.

== Early life, education ==
Bilal Alayli Or Alayeli (ar: بلال عبد الله العلايلي) was born in Beirut, Lebanon in 1949. He was raised in a Sunni Muslim family.

He joined the Lebanese University to graduate in 1973 earning a bachelor's degree in physics. His highest honors qualified him to earn the scholarship of the Lebanese University to travel to France for further academic formation. In France, he obtained a PhD in nuclear physics from the University of Lyon in 1976 and received his diploma in civil engineering from École centrale de Lyon.

== Career ==
He joined the University of Oran (Algeria) from the year of 1976 until the year of 1979. He founded with Dr. Jack Nasr Faculty of Engineering at the Lebanese University in 1981. He was appointed Director of the Faculty of Engineering at the Lebanese University -section III through the years of 1982 and 1992. He remained a professor in that university until the year of 2007.

He worked as an assistant director of Oger from 1982 until 1984. He was appointed assistant director of the Hariri Foundation from 1984 until 1986. He is also a founder of LACECO.

He was elected as the president of the Order of Engineers and Architects in Beirut in April 2008 supported by the Future Movement (almustaqbal) and 14 March. His number at The Order of Engineers and Architects – Beirut is 4173.
