= Citizens in a State =

Lebanese political party

Citizens in a State مواطنون ومواطنات في دولة
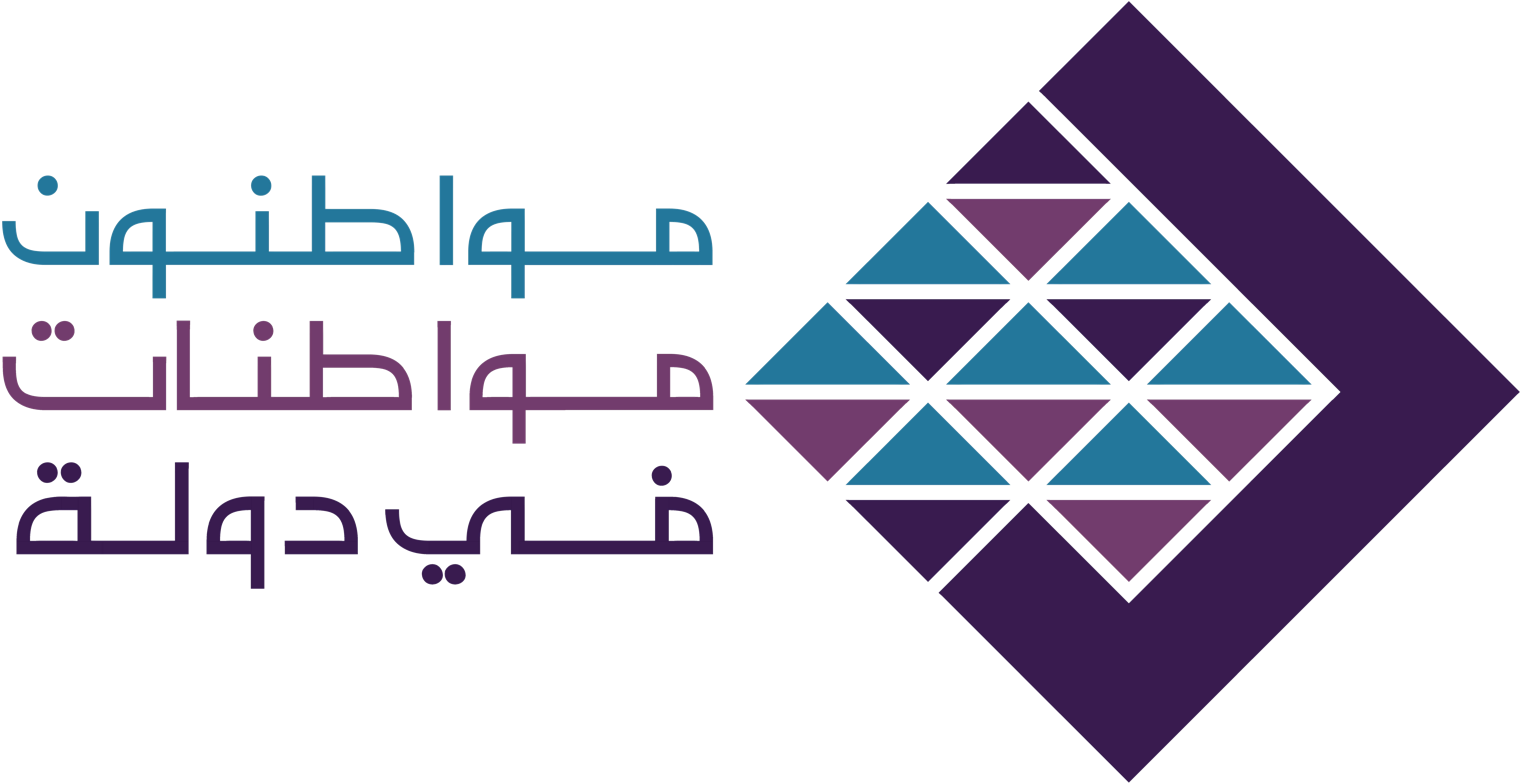
- Abbreviation: MMFD; MMFIDAWLA
- Leader: Charbel Nahas
- Founded: 2016; 10 years ago
- Headquarters: Beirut
- Ideology: Civic nationalism Progressivism; Secularism
- Political position: Centre-left
- Colours: Purple Blue
- Slogan: To decisively contribute in the building of a civil, democratic, fair, and capable state.
- Parliament of Lebanon: 0 / 128
- Cabinet of Lebanon: 0 / 30

Website
- mmfidawla.com

Citizens in a State (Arabic: مواطنون ومواطنات في دولة, romanized: Mouwatinoun wa Mouwatinat fi Dawla, abbreviated MMFD) is a Lebanese political party launched in 2016 by Charbel Nahas, who is also its current General Secretary. The party is a participant in the 17 October Revolution.

== History ==
In his 1999 book, A Socioeconomic Program for Lebanon, Nahas discussed Lebanon's conflicts and financial problems. He proposed an action plan that would acknowledge issues faced by the Lebanese people and outlined actionable steps to improve their financial and political situation. The book was the first political and economic analysis of Lebanon's crisis and made suggestions for a progressive system that prioritized the improvement of the living conditions of the country's citizens.

According to Nahas, the laws issued after 1994 were a series of mistakes resulting in corruption that benefited the political class and its cronies. In 2014, Nahas stated that the entire political system needed change, and that the Taif Agreement was not an actual reform that benefits members of the society who followed it. Therefore, the party took it upon itself to represent the whole Lebanese society without discrimination to formulate a societal project that would contribute to saving the regional communities and not only the Lebanese population. The party blames the government for abandoning its citizens to religious and public institutions and special economic commissions that are playing the roles of the public institutions and are free from control, accountability, and monitoring.

In the 2022 Lebanese General elections, Citizens in a State (MMFD) hosted candidates in every electoral district in Lebanon in lists called "Qadreen" (Capable) led by Charbel Nahas of Beirut I. The coalition presented around 60 candidates with some allying with the LCP and other independents of the 17 October revolution. None of their candidates or lists won enough votes to gain a seat.

== Political positions ==
The party argues that sects cannot form a nation and that the political regime with its current formula is incapable of surviving economic and social hardships, such as the 2019 financial crisis. Following the outbreak of protests on October 17, 2019, the effects of the economic crisis began to peak. The Citizens in a State movement proposed itself as an alternative to manage the transitional phase through a government with exceptional legislative powers and offered a transitional political vision with the title of “Fair and Purposeful Distribution of Losses.”

== Methodology ==
The movement works within a systematic methodology of realistic assessment as the main grounds of choosing its confrontations. The campaign aims to play a decisive role in changing the current political and social regime through anticipating and identifying the regime’s contradictions and building the necessary knowledge and power to handle them. Hence, it offers a substitute that goes beyond what the existing system can offer.

The success of the movement is tied up to the given methodological means:

- Basing arguments on a critical and intellectual effort.
- Assessing all behaviors and initiatives, whether individual or collective, according to their values and contributions to the "societal order."
- Adopting realism in dealing in all forms of "societal order," through exerting the necessary effort to understand its constructs, the historical circumstances affecting its formation, along with the work of its institutions, and the limitations facing its control and the management of its internal conflicts.
