= Timeline of the 2006 Lebanon War =

This is a timeline of events related to the 2006 Lebanon War.

== July 12–19 ==
=== Wednesday, July 12 ===
The conflict began on July 12 when 8 Israeli soldiers were killed and a further two were captured during a cross-border attack. At approximately 9 am local time, Hezbollah's military wing launched a barrage of rockets and mortars on the northern Israeli town of Shlomi, apparently as a diversion.

An Israeli border patrol consisting of two armored IDF Humvees patrolling on the Israeli side of the border near the village of Zar'it was attacked with anti-tank rockets killing three soldiers, wounding three, and abducting two into Lebanon's territory. Hezbollah has named this operation "True Promise.". The IDF confirmed that two Israeli troops were abducted from Israeli territory by Hezbollah, and identified them as Ehud Goldwasser and Eldad Regev. An Israeli Merkava Mark II tank was damaged by a 300 kg improvised explosive device as it crossed the border in Lebanon, attempting to pursue Hezbollah. All four of the crew members were killed. Another Israeli soldier was killed when he came under heavy fire during an attempted recovery of the bodies from the tank. In all, 8 soldiers were killed, 2 captured and 6 wounded. Israel's Foreign Ministry Spokesman Mark Regev claims the Hezbollah unit that captured the two soldiers is trying to transfer them to Iran. However, the spokesman did not disclose his source. Israel attacked Hezbollah's TV station Al-Manar and radio station Al-Nour in Haret Hreyk (Harat Hurayk), a southern suburb of Beirut, and in Baalbeck.

Hezbollah leader Hassan Nasrallah later declared that "No military operation will return them [the captured soldiers]... The prisoners will not be returned except through one way: indirect negotiations and a trade [of prisoners]."

The attacks came two weeks after the beginning of the Gaza Strip-focused Operation Summer Rains by the Israel Defense Forces whose objective was to free the Israeli soldier Gilad Shalit captured on June 25, 2006, by Hamas militants in an earlier cross-border attack organized by Hamas that left two Israeli soldiers dead.

In negotiations for the 2004 prisoner exchange, Hezbollah had sought the release of Lebanese prisoners held by Israel. While many were released, Hezbollah failed to achieve the release of Samir Kuntar. Having failed to achieve this objective, Hassan Nasrallah declared that the organization would carry out further operations at a later date to gain the release of the remaining prisoners. The Hezbollah leader later called for talks on prisoner exchange which was officially rejected by Olmert. However it was widely believed that negotiations were underway with Egypt as mediator.

Israel called together an emergency cabinet meeting, during which Prime Minister Olmert said that it held the Beirut government responsible for the attack, vowing that it would pay a "heavy price" for the attacks, adding "The Lebanese government, of which Hezbollah is a part, is trying to shake regional stability". Plans to locate "thousands" of reserve troops were also announced. Israeli Defence Minister Amir Peretz also said that "the State of Israel sees itself free to use all measures that it finds it needs, and the [Israeli Forces] have been given orders in that direction." The United Nations envoy to the region, Geir Pedrson, condemned the Hezbollah action and called on Hezbollah to release the soldiers.

Lebanese Prime Minister Fuad Siniora denied any knowledge of the raid and stated that he did not condone it. An emergency meeting of the Lebanese government reaffirmed this position. Hezbollah's action aroused varying reactions among Lebanese political forces. It was harshly criticised by many members of the largely anti-Syrian parliamentary majority, while Michel Aoun, despite his understanding with the party, declared that he supported the government's position.

In response, the Israel Defense Forces (IDF) launched a series of air and artillery strikes at positions in southern Lebanon, generally seen as the support base for Hezbollah. Israeli General Dan Halutz threatened to "turn Lebanon's clock back 20 years" in a reference to the destruction Lebanon suffered in its bloody civil war. Israeli troops later bombed a main road in the south of Lebanon leaving two civilians dead, and a series of air-raids followed during the night which also targeted the civilian infrastructure. Israel said that they were trying to prevent the captured soldiers from being removed to Iran.

=== Thursday, July 13 ===
On Thursday, July 13, Israel began implementing a land and sea blockade on Lebanon. The Beirut International Airport (the sole international airport in Lebanon) was bombed, forcing all international flights to be diverted to Cyprus. The Israeli army said the airport had been used to smuggle in weapons to Hezbollah.

Many roads and bridges were struck by Israel, essentially cutting off the predominantly Shia southern Lebanon from the Capital in Beirut.Warplanes also bombed the road to Damascus, the capital of Syria, and struck a bridge in a suburb south of Beirut, a place highly valued by Hezbollah. They also struck a power plant's fuel storage south of Beirut (but did not destroy the plant itself). People living in this region heard at least three strikes. No casualties were reported. However, the strike eventually resulted in the spilling of over 15,000 tons of heavy fuel oil, affecting 50 miles (80 km) of coastline and threatening aquatic life and fishing. Israeli jets attacked two Lebanese military air bases, destroying runways which Israel claims were used by the Hezbollah to transfer supplies. Attacks against the Rayak air base in the eastern Bekaa Valley near the Syrian border and the Qulayaat military airport (also known as Kleyate or Rene Mouawad airport) in northern Lebanon were the first attacks against Lebanon's army in the conflict.

An unnamed senior IDF officer stated that the strikes were targeted against rocket launch sites and rocket storerooms, although, he said, many of them were intentionally located by Hezbollah in civilian population centers. An unnamed Lebanese official responded that "Hezbollah did not store arms in civilian areas." Air strikes were also carried out against outposts of Hezbollah. Israel had named the overall operation "Just Reward", and Maj.-Gen. Udi Adam of the Northern Command, says Israel has not ruled out sending ground forces into Lebanon.

Hezbollah declared an all-out military alert, and said it had 13,000 rockets capable of hitting towns and installations far into northern Israel. As a result, Defense Minister Peretz told commanders to prepare civil defense plans, and some 220,000 Israeli civilians spent the night in bomb shelters. Hezbollah continued to fire rockets at Israel, killing one Israeli civilian, a 40-year-old in Nahariya, and wounding 14 others. Another Israeli civilian, a 33-year-old man in Safed, later died from the wounds inflicted.

Hezbollah had threatened to hit the city Haifa, "if the southern suburbs and the city of Beirut are subjected to any direct Israeli aggression". Two rockets hit Haifa, hours after the threat. Hezbollah denied firing any rockets at the city. Israeli sources later reported that two rockets were fired from inside Lebanon. The attack is the first time rockets have hit so far south into Israel. One shock injury had been reported from these initial attacks on Haifa.

Twelve members of one Lebanese family were reported by Lebanese authorities to have been killed when Israeli planes bombed their home in the Lebanese village of Zibqine, near Tyre. According to the Lebanese government, in Dweir, a small village near Nabatiye, Israeli planes dropped a bomb onto the home of a local Shia Muslim cleric, killing him, his wife and eight of his children. Another family from that same village was also reported to have lost seven members following Israeli bombing. Israel intensified its response on Lebanon by attacking the Beirut International Airport and damaging three runways.

The Lebanese government called for a Cease-fire, claiming the Israeli response was "disproportionate", a view echoed by France and Russia. 35 Lebanese civilians are believed to have been killed.

=== Friday, July 14 ===
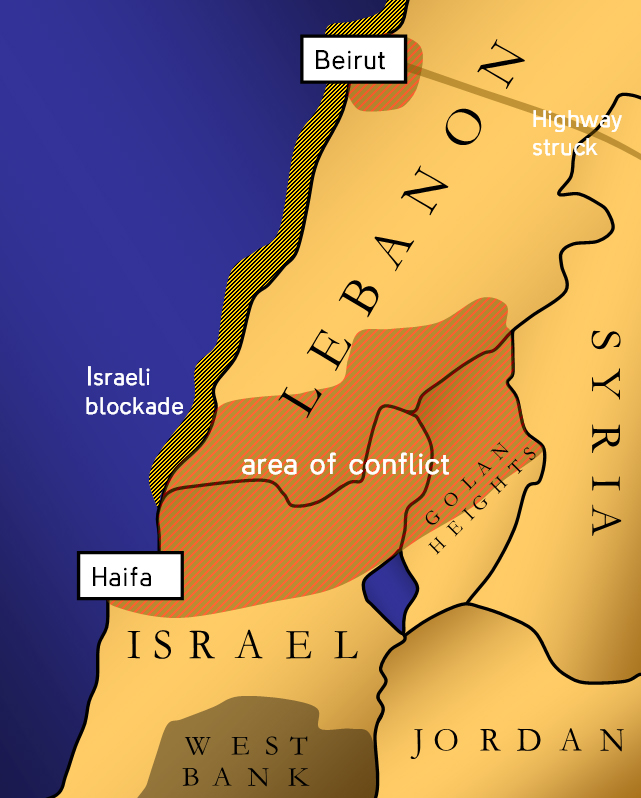
Map of conflict as of July 14, 2006. In yellow is the Israeli blockade, in the red area regions of active conflict.

The Israeli offensive into Lebanon continues, and for the first time the offices of Hezbollah are bombed. Hezbollah declares "open war".

The Israeli Sa'ar 5-class missile boat INS Hanit that was blockading the waters 10 nautical miles (19 km) off of the Lebanese coast was damaged in the stern after being hit by a C-802 anti-ship missile. Various sources are reporting that the missile is Chinese-made while others report that it was Iranian-made or procured from Iran, a charge which Iran denies. It is known that China has provided Iran with this type of missile in the past. Early on there were mistaken reports that it had been hit by an unmanned aerial vehicle packed with explosives, and that there was no serious damage to the ship. Israel immediately recovered one sailor's body, and three more were found two days later.

An Egyptian civilian merchant ship, the Moonlight, was hit by a Hezbollah rocket, caught in the cross-fire as Hezbollah was firing on the Israelis. The ship was registered in Cambodia, but sailing under Egyptian flag, carrying several hundred tons of cement. The ship sank in minutes, but the Egyptian crew managed to board lifeboats and was picked up by another civilian vessel. One crewman, however, was seriously injured.

Hezbollah launched about 100 Katyusha rockets on Israeli towns of Nahariya, Safed, Hatzor HaGlilit, Rosh Pina, Kiryat Shmona, and Karmiel, and in the agricultural settlements Mattat, Sasa, Peki'in, Beit Jan, Biria, Biranit, Kabri, Gesher Haziv, Sa'ar and Ben Ami, resulting in 30 injuries. Late the same day, a Katyusha in Meron killed two people, a grandmother and her 5-year-old grandson, and residents of Haifa are reportedly being ordered into bomb shelters.

The Jerusalem Post reported that an attempt by a group of Hezbollah members to enter Israel was stopped by IDF.

The number of Lebanese civilians killed in the Israeli strikes rises above 50, and the United Nations convened an emergency meeting of the Security Council where Lebanon accused Israel of launching "a widespread barbaric aggression".

=== Saturday, July 15 ===
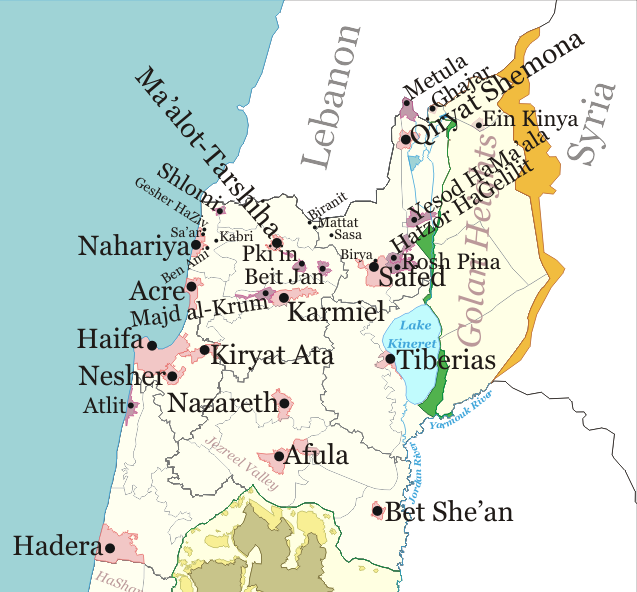
Map showing Israeli localities attacked by rockets fired from Lebanese soil

Three Patriot anti-ballistic missile batteries were deployed in Haifa. These are aimed at intercepting missiles launched at Haifa. The last time Patriot missiles were deployed to the region was in 2003, during the Iraq War.

Israeli Defence Minister Amir Peretz has declared martial law throughout north Israel.

On July 15, Israel attacked commercial ports in the towns of Beirut and Tripoli, as well as ports in Jounieh and Amsheet, two predominantly Christian towns.

A witness reported that at least 15 Lebanese villagers were killed on July 15 in an Israeli air strike on vehicles fleeing a village in southern Lebanon. The convoy left the border village of Marwahin, was refused asylum in a U.N. base and afterwards it was attacked. It is also reported that some hours before the strike, Israeli forces had told the inhabitants of the village to evacuate by loudspeaker.

=== Sunday, July 16 ===
On the morning of July 16, several barrages of Katyusha rockets hit the northern cities of Haifa, Acre, and Nahariya, and explosions were also heard in Rosh HaNikra. Eight were killed in Haifa, and several were seriously wounded when unguided rockets hit a railway maintenance depot. Al-Manar has reported that the Hezbollah attack included a Fajr-3 and a Ra'ad 1 liquid-fuel missiles, developed by Iran. Hezbollah said the attack was aimed at a large Israeli fuel storage plant adjacent to the railway facility. Photo of the area, with oil drums and smoke rising from the railway depot. Rockets also hit the villages of Shtula and Zar'it, the site of the original Hezbollah attack. Additional barrages hit the Israeli Arab town of Ghajar and kibbutz Ma'ayan Baruch as well as striking Meron and Safed again, all with no injuries. On Sunday evening Hezbollah militants attempted to infiltrate an Israel Defense Forces post on the Lebanese Border.

On July 16, Lebanese President Émile Lahoud and Lebanese military sources stated that Israeli forces had used white phosphorus incendiary bombs against civilian targets on villages in the Arqoub area in the South accusing Israel of using banned weapons against Lebanese civilians. This claim has not been verified. (However, according to several sources, mainly UN, Israel artillery sprayed the entire Southern Lebanon with cluster bombs, mostly outdated surplus from previous wars, some as old as 1982. As much as 2/3 of the explosives was reported unexploded, and according to UN mine clearing units as of March 2008 still on average killing or wounding one Lebanese every second day. UN has to date disarmed 160.000 hidden bomb units but believes to have another million to go.)

On July 16, Sky News reported that Hezbollah leader Hassan Nasrallah was wounded in a morning air strike on his Beirut compound, though Hezbollah affiliated sources have denied the reports as propaganda. News services report that three explosions have been heard in Beirut. Hezbollah TV reports that the air strike destroyed a building containing the headquarters of Hezbollah, with Hezbollah's chief, Hassan Nasrallah, likely inside. He was not harmed, however, and has since released a videotape.

=== Monday, July 17 ===
The Hezbollah leader, Nasrallah, said in his third televised speech since the conflict began that "In the beginning, we started to act calmly, we focused on Israel military bases and we didn't attack any settlement, Hizbullah militants had destroyed military bases, while the Israelis killed civilians and targeted Lebanon's infrastructure." He added that Hezbollah's arsenal had yet to take a direct hit "and so far we have used a small portion of our weaponry."

On July 17, 2006, three rounds of Hezbollah rockets struck the port city of Haifa, wounding two people and partially destroying a three-story residential building. Rockets were also reported to have hit the town of Atlit, 56 km south of the border and 8 km south of Haifa. No injuries were reported. Hezbollah reportedly struck a hospital in the Northern Israel town of Safed. The Israeli army says that 15 cities were hit by rockets in a late night raid injuring 5 people when a rocket hit a synagogue.

Some Israeli ground troops briefly advanced approximately 1 km into Lebanon and leveled Hezbollah border outposts with bulldozers in an effort to make it difficult for Hezbollah to reestablish its border presence.

=== Tuesday, July 18 ===
On July 18, 13 civilians from two families were killed in an air raid on the southern town of Aytaroun, reports indicates that the dead included nine children, taking the death toll to more than 200. The UAE Red Crescent Society condemned Israel's attack on medical and relief convoy in Lebanon.

=== Wednesday, July 19 ===
On July 19, the Israeli military said aircraft dropped 23 tons of explosives on what it believed was a bunker for senior Hezbollah leaders in the Bourj al-Barajneh neighborhood of Beirut between 8 pm and 9 pm. Hezbollah said none of its members were hurt and denied a leadership bunker was in the area, saying a mosque under construction was hit.

According to CNN, Israel made an incursion into Southern Lebanon to destroy outposts of the militant group Hezbollah. An IDF spokesman said the troops are "close to the border" however no further details were given as to the success of the operation. Israeli leadership denies these claims.

Fighting with Hezbollah fighters took place. 2 Israeli soldiers and at least 4 Hezbollah fighters were killed and 9 Israeli soldiers were wounded. One Israeli Merkava Mark II tank was damaged by a mortar round.

Two Israeli Arab children were killed in Nazareth as a result of a Hezbollah rocket attack.

By July 19, heavy damage to Lebanon's infrastructure had been reported, with a total of 42 bridges destroyed and 38 roads damaged. and extensive damage to telecommunications, electricity, ports, airports, and even private sector facilities, including a milk factory and food warehouses. Damage to fuel containers in Jiyye and 12 service stations in Bir Abed, Khiam, Ain Ibl, Moseileh, Rmeileh, Houla, Hesbe, Tyre, Kfar Kila, and Douris raised the likelihood of fuel shortages.

== July 20–31 ==
=== Thursday, July 20 ===
On July 20, there was further fighting inside the Lebanese border between IDF soldiers and Hezbollah militants. According to Captain Eric Scheider from the IDF, there had been heavy fighting in two places inside the Lebanese border. At least, 5 Israeli soldiers and 2 Hezbollah militants were killed and 11 Israeli soldiers were wounded in the fighting. In one clash, just across the border from the Israeli town of Avivim, guerrillas fired an anti-tank missile at an Israeli tank, destroying it and seriously wounding one soldier. Hezbollah claims to have shot down an Israeli helicopter and destroyed two tanks during the encounter. It was also reported that an Israeli army armored bulldozer was destroyed by an anti-tank missile. Separately, two Israeli Apache helicopters crashed into each other over northern Israel, leaving one soldier dead and three wounded. This comes as Israel claims it has carried out 80 air strikes in Lebanon early on Thursday.

=== Friday, July 21 ===
On July 21, Israel continued airstrikes against Lebanon while massing troops on the border and calling up five battalions of army reservists (3000 reserves) for a possible ground invasion. Between 300 and 500 Israeli soldiers backed by 30 tanks were already believed to be over the border. Roughly 70 percent of Lebanese civilians living in south Lebanon fled north, and the Lebanese defense minister stated that in the event of an Israeli ground invasion that the Lebanese army would fight alongside Hezbollah. Hezbollah continued firing rockets at the Israeli town of Haifa injuring 20 Israelis while Israeli jets hit Shiite districts in Beirut's southern suburbs, the eastern Bekaa Valley and southern Lebanon around sunrise, killing 12 Lebanese. German and Russian intelligence were reportedly seeking the release of the captured IDF soldiers.

=== Saturday, July 22 ===
On July 22, close to 2,000 troops entered southern Lebanon, though some returned to Israel during the day. IDF forces seized the Lebanese village of Maroun al-Ras, a village reputed to be a staging area for Hezbollah and targeted a religious complex in Sidon. Hezbollah said that two fighters were killed. Israeli jets bombed television and cellphone transmission towers in Christian areas north of Beirut killing one person. Israeli airstrikes also targeted sites around the southern Lebanese village of Khiyam, seeking out Hezbollah positions and rocket launchers, and blasted road traffic around the coastal city of Tyre. Beirut was struck as were roads connecting Lebanon and Syria. A total of 124 targets deep inside Lebanon were targeted, killing 5 Lebanese. Israeli officials stated that no full-scale invasion of Lebanon was planned, but warned villagers in fourteen south Lebanon villages to leave and thousands of Lebanese fled to the north to the port city of Sidon. American officials said that deliveries of precision guided bombs were being expedited to Israel due to an Israeli request. Over 160 rockets were fired by Hezbollah, hitting towns across northern Israel and injuring 16 people. An IDF soldier sustained light-to-moderate wounds Saturday when Hezbollah fired on an outpost near the Lebanese border.

=== Sunday, July 23 ===
On July 23, Israeli air raids hit Beirut and east and south Lebanon, killing eight civilians and wounding 100, many of them in Tyre. Six Israeli bombs fell on the coastal city of Tyre in a 20-minute span, killing one civilian and wounding about 45. Three civilians were killed by an Israeli bombing as they were evacuating south Lebanon. A textile factory in the border town of al-Manara was struck, killing one person and injuring two. In Baalbek, strikes leveled an agricultural compound and wounded five. A factory producing prefab houses near the highway linking Beirut to Damascus was targeted and a transmission factory in Fatqa was also leveled. About 270 airstrikes were conducted throughout Lebanon. Meanwhile, roughly 90 rockets struck northern Israel killing two people in Haifa and wounding 70. Meanwhile, fighting between Israeli soldiers and Hezbollah fighters took place. Hezbollah said 3 of its guerrillas were killed in fighting. Israel accuses Hezbollah of vastly underreporting casualties.

Israeli officials stated they would accept an international force led by NATO to keep Hezbollah guerrillas away from the border. The Syrian Information Minister stated that Syria would enter the war if IDF forces threatened Syria as the Syrian Deputy Foreign Minister indicated a willingness to engage American officials in dialogue and pressed for a ceasefire. U.S. Ambassador to the U.N. John Bolton said it was "hard to see" benefits from a Syrian-American dialogue but was open to a NATO-led force in Lebanon. Regarding any multinational presence, Lebanese Prime Minister Fuad Saniora told CNN "it's very early to talk about this matter".

=== Monday, July 24 ===
On July 24, Israeli troops advanced further into southern Lebanon where they encountered heavy resistance. IDF forces engaged Hezbollah guerrillas in Bint Jbail, the largest Lebanese town near the border. IDF sources reported that two Israeli soldiers were killed and 20 were wounded. Hezbollah reported that three of their fighters were killed, while Israel said there were larger casualties. Two tanks were also damaged. An Apache helicopter on its way to support the ground force in Bint Jbeil crashed in Northern Israel, killing two IAF pilots. Hezbollah stated that it shot down the helicopter; however, the IDF said the cause was under investigation and was possibly due to friendly fire. Near the end of fighting Monday, the IDF forces controlled a hilltop in Bint Jbail while Hezbollah remained in control of the rest of the city. Israel halted airstrikes in Beirut due to a surprise visit by US Secretary of State Condoleezza Rice. Airstrikes continued in south Lebanon, killing seven near Tyre. Hezbollah continued to fire rockets into Northern Israel, wounding 13 with roughly 100 rockets.

=== Tuesday, July 25 ===
On July 25, the IDF intensified its operations in Lebanon with over 100 strikes in southern Lebanon and fresh assaults on Beirut. Seven were killed in Nabatieh when an Israeli shell struck a house, and twelve were killed Tuesday evening in the Dahiya quarter of Beirut. Two houses were also destroyed east of Tyre. Fighting continued between IDF forces and Lebanese guerrillas near Bint Jbeil with IDF forces surrounding the town. Eight IDF soldiers were lightly wounded. Hezbollah said seven of its fighters were killed, and fellow Shiite group Amal said four of its fighters had been killed. During the course of the day, Hezbollah fired over 100 rockets into northern Israel. In Haifa, one civilian died of a heart attack during rocket fire as 20 more were injured. Rockets also killed one and injured three in Maghar.

Israeli officials indicated that they planned to maintain a ground presence in south Lebanon until a multinational peacekeeping force was deployed there, preferably NATO.

=== Wednesday, July 26 ===
On July 26, the IDF continued operations in Lebanon with 60 strikes primarily on military targets. During the raids, 13 civilians in Tyre were injured. Two truck drivers were killed when the IAF fired missiles at supply vehicles. One aid worker and three wounded near the Syrian border. Air strikes also killed four unarmed UN observers with artillery strikes and precision guided munitions, in what UN Secretary General Kofi Annan called a deliberate strike. Their position was well known, and repeated calls were made to request that Israel stop the attacks.

In south Lebanon, nine IDF soldiers were killed and 27 wounded as they battled Hezbollah guerrillas near the border. The casualties sustained by the Israelis were the highest since the initiation of conflict. Hezbollah fired 151 rockets into northern Israel, injuring 31. Israeli Prime Minister Ehud Olmert said that Israel planned to maintain a 2 km security zone from the border free of Hezbollah as talks continued in Rome for an international peacekeeping force. Lebanese officials arrested 50 on charges of spying for Israel.

=== Thursday, July 27 ===
The IDF carried out over 120 air strikes in southern Lebanon, the Bekaa valley and Beirut. At least 11 were killed. Hezbollah guerrillas in Lebanon fired over 100 Katyusha rockets at targets in northern Israel landing across the Galilee and Hula Valley. Thirteen were lightly injured. Israeli officials indicated that they planned not to expand ground operations from their current scope despite pressure from the military. The decision was made, however, to intensify air strikes. In addition, three divisions of reservists (15,000 troops) were mobilized.

=== Friday, July 28 ===
Lebanese officials reported that Israel conducted over 130 air raids (killing 13) while an Israeli police spokesman said that Hezbollah fired 97 rockets into Northern Israel (wounding 3). Hezbollah fired a new kind of rocket it called the Khaibar-1 which struck near the Israeli town of Afula. The rocket has a 100 kg warhead, which is significantly more powerful than the Katyusha rockets, and may be the same as Fajr-5 rocket. The IDF reported that 26 gunmen were killed in clashes near the southern Lebanon town of Maroun Al Ras, Bint Jbeil and Eitaroun. Shelling was also conducted on Al Nabatiyya and Sour in addition to areas in Al Biqa plains, 14 Lebanese fatalities were reported.

In Israel, there was disagreement between Mossad intelligence which says Hezbollah will be able to continue fighting at the current level for a long time and military intelligence which believes Hezbollah has been severely damaged. Other scholars have also questioned the Israeli reliance on air power.

The Mehr news agency in Iran said Ali Larijani, secretary of Iran's Supreme National Security Council, was in Damascus for meetings on the crisis, but gave no other details. Furthermore, Iran's state news agency confirmed Hezbollah Secretary General Hassan Nasrallah's presence in Damascus. Although Hezbollah has received significant Iranian assistance in the past, Iranian officials denied assisting Hezbollah in the current conflict.

=== Saturday, July 29 ===
"IDF leaves Bint Jbeil area."Israeli newspaper declared. During the morning hours most of the units who took part in Bint Jbeil began to withdraw from the area. The battle for Bint Jbail has symbolized Israel's difficulty in pushing guerrillas back from the border, whether by air bombardment or ground assault. Armored forces are still fighting. Israel has declared it succeed in it mission and killed more than 70 militant in Bin Jbeil. It was reported the next day that this had been an IDF "withdrawal" and that Hizbollah still held Bint Jbeil.

There were IDF missile attacks around the area of Al Safeer, in the Al Dahia Al Janoubiyya area of Beirut, and shelling of the Jarhou’ area in southern Lebanon. North of Beirut IDF shelling destroyed the Al Assy Bridge. Shelling attacks were also made against Jabal Abu Rashid, Borka, Jbour and Al Nahry in Al Biqa plains. Sahl Al Khiyam, in Marj Oyoun area, in southern Lebanon were also shelled with artillery as well as Al Tayba and Markaba villages. The area around Sour city and outlying villages was also shelled. An IDF spokeswoman said that the IDF had attacked 51 targets overnight and on Saturday at dawn, destroying 37 buildings used by Hezbollah.

IDF deployed a Patriot interceptor missile battery north of Tel Aviv, in response to Hezbollah firing Khaibar-1 rockets at Afula on July 28.

=== Sunday, July 30 ===
Under cover of artillery strikes IDF ground troops pushed towards the villages of Taiba and Adisa. The IDF said the village was being used as a launching site for rocket attacks. One IDF soldier was shot and wounded near Adisa. A quantity of weapons were also recovered. IDF jets bombed unreported targets in Khiyam and the bombing of Qana caused a large number of civilian fatalities.

Fire from Regular Lebanese Army in Yammouni was reported against IDF Choppers attempting to land in the area. The Lebanese dispersed following airstrikes by IDF.

=== Monday, July 31 ===
Despite a reported qualified suspension in Israeli aerial activity beginning on midnight July 30, IDF bombers hit the area around Tayba. CNN reported that the Israeli Army had explained the bombing was to "protect ground forces operating in the border area and were not aimed at specific targets". The bombing led to damage of an unspecified number of Lebanese Army vehicles in the area. The Israeli Army apologised for the damage.

On July 31, 2006, Hezbullah said that its forces hit an Israeli corvette near the city of Tyre; Israel denied that any of its ships was hit.

One Lebanese Army personnel was killed, and three were injured in an IDF Naval attack on the Lebanese military base north of Tyre. The towns of Al-Awayda area, Kafr Shuba' and Kafr Hamam were also hit with IDF artillery strikes. The Tyre–Kila area was also the scene of IDF air strikes, a ground incursion, and clash with Hezbollah which left three IDF tank personnel wounded. There were unconfirmed reports of a late-night incursion by IDF on the western range of the Lebanese mountains and four Israeli IAF raids targeted the Faraya road around Hermel in the Bekaa valley.

== August 1–4 ==
=== Tuesday, August 1 ===
Hezbollah said its fighters managed to destroy an Israeli warship of the coast of Tyre, though Israel disputed the claim. Shelling of Mansouri, Shamaa and Teir Harfan took place by IDF Naval units. Operations continued around Hermel with an attack on a pickup truck loaded with cooking gas tanks, and 5 strikes on a road linking eastern Lebanon to western regions and coastline. Attacks were also reported around the Masnaa crossing into Syria, which had been subject to a series of attacks in the last three days. Two of the four border crossings into Syria are now closed because of damage- the main Beirut-Damascus highway was described by the Jerusalem Post as "impassable" due to previous attacks. Defense Minister Peretz said that attacks would continue on targets which he reportedly described as "convoys smuggling weapons across the border into Lebanon". Shelling of the Ba'labak area near the Syrian border and several areas in Al Biqa' region were also reportedly hit with shelling and three air strikes. Six airstrikes reportedly hit the village of Sour. Al-Jazeera TV reported that Israeli aircraft bombed Bayyada, and Mansoureh. The IDF reported that twenty Hezbollah fighters in the villages of Al Taiba and Al Adasiyya were killed during fighting in the areas since July 30. A clash between IDF Paratroopers & Hezbollah was reported to have taken place around Ayta a-Shaab with three IDF dead by anti-tank fire with the IDF saying twenty Hezbollah died in the fighting. The IDF later confirmed the HeAzbollah dead as ten. Hezbollah issued a statement saying that the IDF had killed three Hezbollah fighters during fighting around Kfar Kila, Odaisseh, and Taibeh, near the Lebanese town of Marjayoun. Hezbollah gave its fatalities since July 13 as forty-eight in total. While the IDF reported four Hezbollah dead. Five rockets and a number of mortar shells were fired at the western Galilee between Rosh HaNikra and Ma'alot on Tuesday wounding five IDF.

=== Wednesday, August 2 ===
Between evening of August 1 and early on August 2 IDF Commandos were reported to be engaged in fighting around Dar al-Hikma Hospital in Baalbek, an area described as a "Hezbollah stronghold". The intended target of the raid was reported to have been Sheikh Mohammed Yazbek a member of Hezbollah's Shoura Council, and a Lebanese representative of the Iranian spiritual leader, Ayatollah Ali Khamenei. Last month the IAF bombed his house in Baalbek. It was unclear whether Yazbek had been captured by IDF but it was reported that he was not in the hospital at the time of the raid. The IDF denied Yazbek was the intended target of the raid on the hospital but three unidentified POW described as "Hizbullah officials" were captured. In a broadcast on Al-Manar TV Hezbollah said "Those who were taken prisoner are citizens. It will not be long before the enemy will discover that they are ordinary citizens." 11 civilians were reported killed, 10 Lebanese and one Syrian.

Hezbollah said it had attacked an Israeli Army armoured unit inside Lebanon, destroying two tanks and leaving their crews dead or wounded as they attempted to advance on the Rub Thalatheen hill at Adaisseh. The IDF denied the report.

=== Thursday, August 3 ===
An IDF missile struck a house in Taibeh in the early morning, killing a family of three, Lebanese security officials said. Taibeh was the scene of fighting between IDF & Hezbollah. Hezbollah said it destroyed one IDF tank and two bulldozers killing or woundings it occupants. IDF said one tank was damaged with no casualties.

132 rockets hit Israel by 1300 hrs localtime. 100 hitting northern Israel in a matter of minutes. Israeli death toll in the conflict stood at 68, with 41 soldiers killed in fighting and 27 civilians in rocket attacks. Lebanese PM Saniora said more than 900 people had been killed and 3,000 wounded, but he did not say whether the new figure, a rise of 380 from 520 confirmed dead also included those missing presumed dead.

Hezbollah leader Hassan Nasrallah vowed to strike Tel Aviv in retaliation for Israel's bombardment of Lebanon's capital, Beirut. "If you hit Beirut, the Islamic resistance will hit Tel Aviv and is able to do that with God's help", Nasrallah said in a televised address.

Hezbollah spokesman Hussein Rahal told al Jazeera television: "Declaring a cease-fire is not the concern of the people of Lebanon as long as there is one Israeli soldier on Lebanese soil – even one meter (into Lebanon).. We will not accept any (Israeli) soldier staying on Lebanese territory, and it is the right of every Lebanese to fight until liberation."

Israeli Defense Minister Peretz announced that he had instructed the IDF to prepare for "a swift takeover of the entire area south of the Litani [River]" and to operate in all the areas where rockets had been launched. An incursion to the Litani would represent a distance of 18 miles (29 km) into south Lebanon. IDF said its soldiers have taken up positions in or near 11 towns and villages in south Lebanon, a zone reaching from the coast to the 'Galilee Panhandle' eastwards. Estimates of IDF forces in S.Lebanon were six brigades approximately 10,000 soldiers.

IDF bombers, reportedly fired two rockets at a house in Baalbek. One woman died and three people were wounded, IDF officials stated.

Calls for a ceasefire demanded that Israel stops its revenge attacks against Lebanese civilians and that Hezbollah lay down its arms.

=== Friday, August 4 ===
It was estimated in a Haaretz analysis piece that the total number of rocket launchers that had been destroyed by IDF forces in Lebanon was "ten" and an estimate of Hezbollah killed given by IDF was "380". 33 civilian farm workers are killed and 20 wounded after Israeli airstrike in a farm near Qaa in Lebanon, close to the Lebanon-Syria border in the Beqaa valley A hospital official and the mayor said all the casualties were Syrian workers, and security forces said most of the casualties were employees or truck drivers. The IDF said it targeted two buildings that contained weapons. The Israeli government has accused Hezbollah of using civilians as shields. Israeli aircraft destroyed four bridges on the main coastal highway north of Beirut, disrupting efforts to aid civilians displaced or trapped by the conflict. After bombing the last land routes into Beirut, and effectively cutting off the Lebanese capital from relief supplies, Israel issued a statement saying the attacks were designed to thwart Syrian attempts to arm Hezbollah." "Syria is determined to continue rearming Hezbollah and supply it with weaponry used to attack Israel", said an IDF statement. "The IDF is determined to stop this flow of arms to Hezbollah. The attacks on the bridge last night, which connect Syria and Lebanon, were to this end." The IDF said the two or three rockets were among more than 200 that landed across northern Israel. The most deadly attack came in Tiberias, where three civilians were killed. The IDF put the Israeli death toll at 74, including 30 civilians. Israeli authorities say more than 600 people have been injured. Across Lebanon, dozens died in Israeli attacks, as Hezbollah rockets struck Hadera, the southernmost point the Islamic militia has reached with its attacks thus far in the conflict. No injuries were reported, police said. Hadera is about 25 miles (40 kilometers) north of Tel Aviv, which Hezbollah leader Hassan Nasrallah threatened August 3 to strike in retaliation for Israeli attacks on Beirut. On the Lebanese side of the border, AP quoted Lebanese security officials as saying that Israeli airstrikes buried 57 people under rubble after flattening homes in two villages near the Israeli border, Taibeh and Ayta ash Shab. No other details were immediately available.

=== Sunday, August 6 ===
Twelve IDF reservists are killed by a Katyusha rocket explosion in Kfar Giladi, in the single deadliest strike on Israeli soldiers during the 2006 Lebanon War.

=== Thursday, August 10 ===
By this time, nine IDF brigades of both regular and reserve troops were operating in Southern Lebanon, about 12 kilometers (8 miles) into Lebanon.

IDF troops kill three Hizbullah fighters in Ayta ash-Sha'ab, and four others in another village. Israeli commandos also destroyed a rocket launcher on a beach south of Tyre, and another rocket launcher was destroyed north of Bint Jbeil.

== Post-ceasefire events ==
Just hours after the beginning of the ceasefire on August 14, 2006, about four mortars were fired inside southern Lebanon. An Israeli military spokesman said that Israel would not respond to their firing. On that day four more incidents were recorded when armed Hezbollah members said to have approached Israeli positions were killed.

The day after, on August 15, 2006, Israeli soldiers opened fire when four Hezbollah fighters approached them, killing three. The same day, about 10 rockets were fired by Hezbollah inside southern Lebanon. Israel reiterated it wouldn't respond since the rockets did not cross border.

On August 18, 2006, Lebanese police sources reported that Israeli warplanes launched four missiles toward targets in the eastern Lebanese town of Baalbek. Israeli sources acknowledge that its air force performs sorties over Lebanese territory, but denied breaking the ceasefire. Lebanese officials later contradicted the police sources stating that no missiles were fired by the Israeli planes. The Associated Press reported that Hezbollah had fired at least 10 Katyusha rockets into southern Lebanon. The IDF stated that as none had crossed the border and there were no casualties, they did not respond. Earlier, skirmishes between Israeli forces and Hezbollah left six guerrillas dead. UNIFIL also reported that the IDF fired a tank shell at the Lebanese village of Markaba but that there was no response from the other side.

One day later, on August 19, 2006, Israel launched a raid in Lebanon's eastern Beqaa Valley it says was aimed to disrupt weapons supplies to Hezbollah from Syria and Iran. Lebanese officials said "the Israelis were apparently seeking a guerrilla target in a school." Reports indicate that the Israeli commandos were disguised in Lebanese Army uniforms (thus masquerading as a non-combatant party) and spoke Arabic in an attempt to pass themselves off as Arabs. Two Israeli soldiers and four Hezbollah fighters were killed. U.N. Secretary-General Kofi Annan said he was "deeply concerned" about an Israeli commando raid in eastern Lebanon Saturday, calling it a violation of a U.N.-backed ceasefire. The statement also cites UNIFIL troops as saying there have "also been several air violations by Israeli military aircraft." Israeli Foreign Ministry spokesman Mark Regev told the Associated Press that "[t]he cease-fire is based on (U.N. resolution) 1701 which calls for an international arms embargo against Hezbollah." Regev was referring to article 8 of the resolution which calls for an end to all weapons transfers to Hezbollah.

Less than a week later, on August 27, 2006, UN Secretary-General Kofi Annan said that U.N. troops would not intercept Syrian arms shipments to Hezbollah unless requested to do so by the Lebanese Government.

Following these events, the UN Secretary-General Kofi Annan said on August 29, 2006, that Israel had committed most of the truce violations and described Israel's continuing embargo as "a humiliation and an infringement on [Lebanese] sovereignty." Israeli Prime Minister Ehud Olmert reiterated Israel's willingness to lift the blockade after full implementation of the U.N.-brokered cease fire.

A week later, on September 7, 2006, the aviation blockade was lifted. Then on September 8, 2006, the naval blockade was lifted.

But on September 21, 2006, Hezbollah supporters threw stones over the border fence at Israeli patrols in Israel, seen as part of Hezbollah redeployments. On September 22, 2006, Nasrallah reported in a victory rally that Hezbollah possessed over 20,000 rockets and that it was stronger than before July 12. According to various estimates, the organisation had fewer than 20,000 rockets before and fired about 4,000 rockets during the conflict.

On October 1, 2006, the Israeli army reported that it had completed its withdrawal. The UN has said Israel has withdrawn the bulk of its troops from Lebanon, fulfilling a key condition of the UN ceasefire ending war with Hezbollah, but that some Israeli troops remained in Ghajar. The IDF confirmed its forces were still operating near Ghajar, a village split in two by the border. Because of the volatile nature of the place, Israel says it will maintain a presence in Ghajar until a security agreement is reached with the UN and the Lebanese army. Then on October 3, 2006, Israeli jets conducted mock air raids over Nabatiyeh, Khiam, and Marjayoun in Southern Lebanon, and later over the Iqlim al-Tuffah region and Western Bekaa Valley. An Israeli fighter penetrated the 2-nautical-mile (3.7 km) defence perimeter of the French frigate Courbet without answer radio calls, triggering a diplomatic incident

Israel admitted on October 22 to using white phosphorus in Lebanon. Although Israel continues to deny the use of phosphorus on civilians, doctors in southern Lebanon have suspected some injuries were caused by contact with the chemical. On October 23, Lebanese police reported the "most intensive [Israeli] overflights" of Lebanon after the ceasefire. Two jets flew low over Beirut, while four more aircraft conducted sonic boom raid in Tyre. France, who leads UNIFIL troops, called the continuing overflights "extremely dangerous."

Six Israeli F-16's flew over a German vessel patrolling off Israel's coast just south of the Lebanese border on October 24. The German Defence Ministry said that the planes had given off infrared decoys and one of the aircraft had fired two shots into the air, which had not been specifically aimed. The Israeli military said that a German helicopter took off from the vessel without having coordinated this with Israel, and denied vehemently having fired any shots at the vessel and said "as of now" it also had no knowledge of the jets launching flares over it. Israeli Defence Minister Amir Peretz telephoned his German counterpart Franz Josef Jung to clarify that 'Israel has no intention to carry out any aggressive actions' against the German peacekeeping forces in Lebanon, who are there as part of UNIFIL to enforce an arms embargo against Hezbollah. Germany confirmed the consultations, and that both sides were interested in maintaining good cooperation.

On October 31, 2006, eight Israeli F-15s flew over many areas of Lebanon, including Beirut. The IAF jets also flew over a French peacekeeper position in Lebanon. According to the French Defense Minister Michele Alliot-Marie, the planes came in at what was interpreted as an attack position, and the peacekeepers were "seconds away" from firing at the jets.

After one month, on December 1, 2006, U.N. Secretary-General Kofi Annan submitted a report to the Security Council president maintaining "there were no serious incidents or confrontations" since the cease-fire in August 2006. He did, however, note that peacekeepers reported air violations by Israel "almost on a daily basis", which Israel maintained were a security measure related to continuing Syrian and Iranian arms shipments to Hezbollah, and evidence of the presence of unauthorized armed personnel, assets, and weapons in Lebanon. In one case, a UNIFIL demining team was challenged by two Hezbollah members in combat uniforms armed with AK-47 rifles. UNIFIL notified the Lebanese army, who arrested three suspects the next day. There were also "13 instances where UNIFIL came across unauthorized arms or related material in its area of operation", including the discovery of 17 katyusha rockets and several improvised explosive devices in Rachaiya El-Foukhar, and the discovery of a weapons cache containing seven missiles, three rocket launchers, and a substantial amount of ammunition in the area of Bourhoz. Annan also reported that as of November 20, 2006, 822 cluster bomb strike sites had been recorded, with 60,000 cluster bomblets having been cleared by the UN Mine Action Coordination Center.

Then on January 17, 2007, Israeli IDF Chief of General Staff Dan Halutz resigned. The resignation came shortly after work on a governmental investigation on the conflict was announced complete.

On February 1, 2007, Prime Minister Ehud Olmert told the Winograd Commission, formed to inquire into the Israeli-Lebanese war, that the attack was planned four months in advance based upon an earlier target list drawn up by former Prime Minister Ariel Sharon. Based on prior Hezbollah abduction of IDF soldiers in the North of Israel, Olmert ordered the IDF to put an end to it.

In April 2007, Olmert vowed not to resign despite findings from a comprehensive report which noted his "severe failure" in handling the war.

On June 17, 2007, an unknown militant group fired two rockets from Lebanon into northern Israel, an action which the UN condemned as a serious violation of the ceasefire. Hezbollah denied involvement in the incident, and Israel emphasized that it would restrain itself from responding by force. Saniora pledged that "The state [...] will spare no effort in uncovering those who stand behind this incident."

Israeli jets entered Syrian airspace on September 6, 2007, claiming to search for Syrian weapons shipments to Hezbollah. Iran and North Korea condemned the Israeli action, but the incident provoked little international response otherwise.

== See also ==
- Military operations of the 2006 Lebanon War
- Ceasefire attempts during the 2006 Lebanon War
- International incidents during the 2006 Lebanon War
