= Position of Lebanon in the 2006 Lebanon War =

The flag of Lebanon.

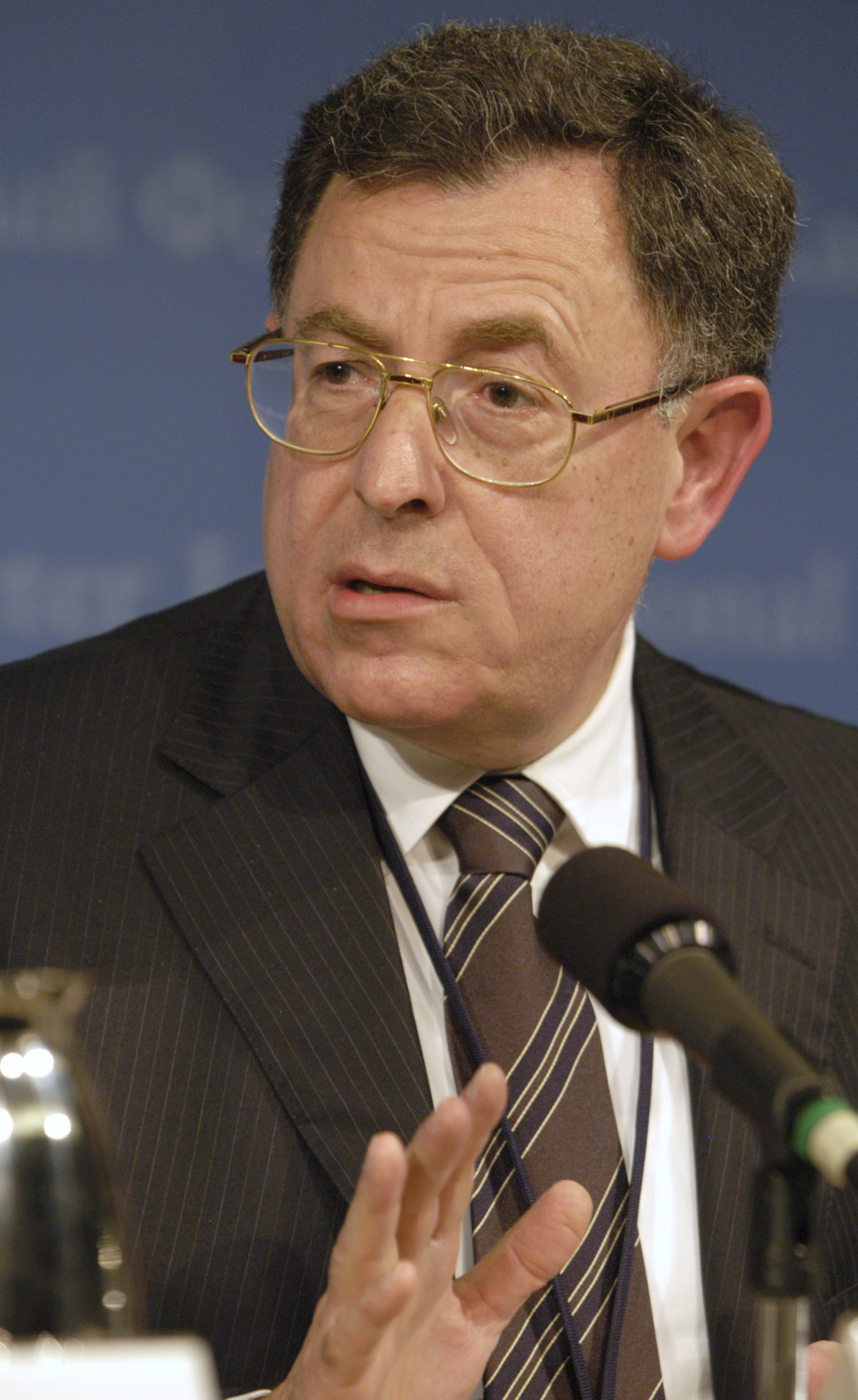
Prime Minister Fouad Siniora.

Lebanon's position in the 2006 Israel–Lebanon conflict from the start was to disavow the Hezbollah shelling and raid on 12 July, while calling for an immediate ceasefire and the withdrawal of all Israeli forces from Lebanese territory.

On 13 July, after an emergency meeting of the Lebanese government, Prime Minister Fouad Siniora stated that the government had not been aware of Hezbollah's raid before it happened "and does not take responsibility for, nor endorses what happened on the international border". On the same day, Lebanon recalled its Ambassador to USA, after he had made comments on television saying that Israel should consider a prisoner exchange with Hezbollah.

On 13 July, a prominent Lebanese Druze member of parliament, Walid Jumblatt, criticized Hezbollah in an interview with the French daily Le Figaro: "Hezbollah played a very dangerous game by kidnapping these two soldiers. ... Israel has withdrawn from Lebanon. These kidnappings took place outside our country's borders. Hezbollah is raising the stakes, with the support of Iran and Syria, which in the past year has become a satellite state of Tehran. … Hezbollah will have to explain itself to the Lebanese. ... [We need to decide] who makes the decisions regarding war and peace in this country."

On 14 July 2006, following a phone call between Siniora and President Bush, the Prime Minister’s office issued the statement that “Prime Minister Siniora called on President Bush to exert all his efforts on Israel to stop its aggression on Lebanon, reach a comprehensive ceasefire and lift its blockade.” The next day, in a televised message to the Lebanese people, and afterwards in an interview with CNN, Siniora said “We call for an immediate ceasefire backed by the United Nations.”

On 16 July, the Lebanese special envoy to the UN, Nouhad Mahmoud, claimed that the United States was obstructing the Security Council's attempt to broker a ceasefire, as the U.S. was the sole member of the 15-nation UN body to oppose any council action. The US position was further made clear by the US Secretary of State Condoleezza Rice, who on the same day, speaking at the G8 meeting in St. Petersburg, said that the only way to deal with the problem is “to deal with the extremists, isolate the extremists, and put in place moderate democratic states”.

On 17 July, Lebanese president, Émile Lahoud, said he would never betray Hezbollah and its leader, Sheikh Hassan Nasrallah.

On 21 July, Lebanese defense minister Elias Murr said that the Lebanese army would fight any ground invasion by Israel.

On 25 July, the Center for Democracy in Lebanon, a Lebanese group which was involved in the Cedar Revolution movement, called for an immediate ceasefire and proposed a Roadmap to Normalization.

At the 26 July Rome Conference, Prime Minister Siniora put forward a seven-point peace plan that has become known as the Siniora Plan. It consisted of a mutual release of prisoners; Israeli troops withdrawing to the demarcated frontier and allowing displaced civilians to return home; Israel's withdrawal from the occupied Shebaa Farms and placing the territory under temporary UN control; extending Lebanese government authority throughout all of southern Lebanon; expanding the existing UN force in South Lebanon, including its authority to intervene; reinvigorating the 1949 Armistice Agreement; and rebuilding the south. The plan is backed by Hezbollah, the EU, Syria and most members of the Arab League, such as Jordan.

On 7 August, the Siniora Plan was further detailed to include 15,000 Lebanese Army troops which would fill the void in southern Lebanon after an Israeli withdrawal before the international force would be in place. This way, the Lebanese government hoped to dispel the claim that the Israeli forces had to remain in Lebanon until the international force had arrived. The number of soldiers corresponded with what Israeli Prime Minister Ehud Olmert has said that the size of the international force needs to be.

On 22 August, the Center for Democracy in Lebanon called upon the Lebanese people and the Siniora Government to consider a rebuilding plan for a “New Beirut”. The plan calls for a "garden of angels" to commemorate the children, victims of the 2006 Israeli aggression on Lebanon; the garden will be located where the “security square” used to be in the southern suburb and will house about 400 life-size statues for children (one for each fallen child); it will be flanked by a museum of innocence commemorating the war, and a children playground. For details see ...for the children.
