= Ceasefire attempts during the 2006 Lebanon War =

The ceasefire attempts during the 2006 Israel-Lebanon conflict started immediately, with Lebanon calling for an immediate and unconditional ceasefire already the day after the start of the war. Israel, however, strongly backed by the United States and the United Kingdom, insisted that there could be no ceasefire until Hezbollah's militia had been disarmed or removed from southern Lebanon. The United Nations Security Council held meetings throughout the conflict but failed to agree on a ceasefire resolution.

== Day-by-day account of the ceasefire attempts ==
=== 13 July ===
The Lebanese Prime Minister Fouad Siniora stated that his government had not been aware of Hezbollah's raid before it happened "and does not take responsibility for, nor endorses what happened on the international border", and Lebanon urged the United Nations to take an immediate decision to stop the firing and lift the Israeli sea and air blockade.

On the same day, the United States vetoed a draft resolution before the Security Council calling for a ceasefire and release of all hostages in relating the Gaza conflict, citing the "fluid and volatile nature of events on the ground" which rendered it outmoded.

=== 14 July ===
BBC News reported that Israeli Prime Minister Ehud Olmert would agree to a ceasefire only if Hezbollah returned the two captured soldiers, stopped firing rockets at Israel, and if Lebanon implemented UN Security Council Resolution 1559, which calls for the group's disarmament.

The Security Council met to consider the situation. Russia, China, France all condemned Hezbollah's activities but considered Israel's military response to be disproportionate.

=== 15 July ===
U.S. President Bush stated that, "We of course are continuing discussions with Israel, all sovereign nations have a right to defend themselves from terrorist attacks. Our message (to Israel) is defend yourself, but be mindful of the consequences, so we are urging restraint."
On the same day, United Nations Security Council rejected pleas from Lebanon that it call for an immediate ceasefire, the U.S. reportedly being the only member of the 15-nation Council to oppose any action.

=== 17 July ===
Prime Minister Ehud Olmert said the fighting in Lebanon would end when Hezbollah guerrillas freed two captured soldiers, rocket attacks on Israel stopped and the Lebanese army deployed along the border. On the same day, UN Secretary-General Kofi Annan and British Prime Minister Tony Blair called for an international force to be sent to Lebanon to stop Hezbollah from attacking Israel. But Israel said it was too soon to talk about deploying an international force.

=== 19 July ===
The United States rejected calls for an immediate ceasefire. Secretary of State Condoleezza Rice said that a ceasefire could only occur when "conditions are conducive to do so".

=== 20 July ===
Secretary-General Kofi Annan briefed the Security Council on the continuing escalation of the conflict.

=== 25 July ===
The Center for Democracy in Lebanon, a Lebanese group which was involved in the Cedar Revolution movement, called for an immediate ceasefire and proposed a "Roadmap to Normalization". The same day, a senior member of Hezbollah's executive committee stated: "Thus far, Hezbollah has had surprising military successes... But Hezbollah is still ready to accept a ceasefire and negotiate indirectly an exchange of prisoners to bring the current crisis to an end".

=== 26 July ===
Foreign ministers from the United States, Europe and the Middle East meeting in Rome vowed "to work immediately to reach with the utmost urgency a ceasefire that puts an end to the current violence and hostilities," though the U.S. maintained strong support for the Israeli campaign and the conference's results were reported to have fallen short of Arab and European leaders' expectations.

At the Rome meeting, Lebanon's Prime Minister Fuad Siniora presented the 7-point Siniora Plan, which called for a mutual release of Lebanese and Israeli prisoners and detainees, a withdrawal of the Israeli ground troops behind the Blue Line, that the disputed Shebaa Farms area is placed under UN jurisdiction until the ownership issue has been settled, that the Lebanese army full takes control over southern Lebanon, and that a strong multi-national force with a UN mandate is placed in southern Lebanon and given the necessary powers to guarantee stability and security. The plan received the support of Hezbollah, the EU and the Arab League, including countries such as Syria and Jordan.

=== 27 July ===
The Security Council met to express its shock and distress and the bombing of a United Nations Observer post (part of UNIFIL) and the deaths of four of its peacekeepers.

=== 28 July ===
The UN Emergency Relief Coordinator Jan Egeland asked for a 72-hour ceasefire to let relief workers to evacuate the elderly, young, and injured and to deliver aid to Lebanon. But Israeli government spokesman Avi Pazner rejected it, saying that "There is no need for a 72-hour temporary ceasefire because Israel has opened a humanitarian corridor to and from Lebanon."

=== 30 July ===
In the aftermath of the bombing raid on Qana, the Israeli government announced a 48-hour limited suspension of air operations over southern Lebanon. The reason given was to allow the UN to coordinate "humanitarian efforts on the ground in southern Lebanon, to allow the IDF time to investigate events at Qana, and, according to an Israeli Army spokesman, to "allow a 24-hour period of safe passage for all residents of south Lebanon who wish to leave". The IDF reserved the right to attack targets that threatened its forces during the pause.

The Security Council was briefed by the Secretary-General about the raid on Qana and took statements from the representative of Lebanon, and then issued a statement expressing its "extreme shock and distress" at the incident.

=== 31 July ===
The Security Council passed United Nations Resolution 1697(2006) calling for the resupply of UNIFIL and to extend its mandate till 31 August, and then held a meeting where the representative of Lebanon and Israel exchanged their points of view.

=== 4 August ===
France and the United States presented a draft UN Security Council resolution. It was, however, regarded as much too favourable to Israel by Lebanon and most Arab nations, as it didn't call for an immediate Israeli withdrawal from Lebanese territory, and only called on Israel to stop its offensive activities, while calling for Hezbollah to stop all activities.

=== 7 August ===
At an emergency meeting of the Arab League in Beirut, the Siniora Plan was further detailed, by specifying that 15,000 Lebanese Army troops would fill the void in southern Lebanon between an Israeli withdrawal and the arrival of the international force. The number of soldiers corresponded with what Israeli Prime Minister Ehud Olmert earlier had said that the size of the international force would need to be.

=== 8 August ===
A delegation from the Arab League came to New York to try to persuade the architects of the UN draft, France and USA, to base it on the Siniora Plan. This, combined with a strong opposition to the existing draft from several of the 15 Council members, especially Qatar, resulted in a change of France's position. In order to avoid a total collapse of the UN efforts to end the hostilities, this eventually led to a substantial revision of the draft proposal (with several re-drafts in between), which included many elements from the Siniora Plan.

The Security Council met and discussed the merits of a draft resolution which was before them (although not publicly available).

=== 11 August ===
The Security Council unanimously adopted a revised draft of the resolution as United Nations Security Council Resolution 1701 in a meeting attended by the Secretaries of State or Foreign Ministers of United States, United Kingdom, France, Qatar, Greece, and Denmark.

=== 12 August ===
The Lebanese government unanimously accepted the UN resolution, and it was also accepted by Hezbollah's leader, Hassan Nasrallah. Later the same day, UN Secretary-General Kofi Annan announced that a ceasefire was to start at 8:00 am local time on 14 August, a time accepted by both Lebanon's PM Fouad Siniora and Israel's PM Ehud Olmert.

=== 13 August ===
The Israeli government also endorsed the resolution, with 24 ministers voting in favour and one, former Defence Minister Shaul Mofaz, abstaining.

=== 18 August ===
In the first large-scale violation of the U.N.-brokered cease-fire between the sides, Israel raided a Hezbollah stronghold deep inside Lebanon, that led to the killing of one Israeli soldier. UN Secretary-General Kofi Annan said Israel had violated the terms of the UN resolution that ended the fighting, and called on all parties to respect the embargo on unauthorised arms shipments to Lebanon.

== See also ==
- 2006 Israel-Lebanon conflict
- 2024 Israel–Lebanon ceasefire agreement
- Siniora Plan
- United Nations Security Council Resolution 1701
