= 2006 Israeli reserve soldiers' protest =

Protest in Tel Aviv calling for a state commission of inquiry over the 2006 Israel-Lebanon conflict (July 16, 2006), to investigate what they said were government failures.

The 2006 Israeli reserve soldiers' protest was a protest movement which called for the resignation of the government and the establishment of a state commission of inquiry (the highest form of inquiry commission in Israel, equivalent to a royal commission) into what they argued were crucial failures experienced during the 2006 Israel-Lebanon conflict. From late August to early October 2006, some of its followers were stationed in a tent city besides the Israeli government building, and several large demonstrations were carried out to protest against the conduct of the government before, during, and after the war.

== Origin of reserve soldiers' protest ==
The protest began on August 21 after a dozen reservists who served on the southern Lebanese military front, situated their demonstration at a park besides the government building, calling for the government's resignation. The protest grew in momentum over several days, and as of August 25 it consisted of several hundred demonstrators, including the influential Movement for Quality Government. On August 24, several parents of Israel Defense Forces soldiers killed in the conflict joined the march. Over 2,000 people participated in the march on August 25.

== Prospects for a state commission ==
Yaakov Hasdai, a member of the Agranat Commission, the national commission which investigated the aftermath of the Yom Kippur War, said that he "support[s] the call for the resignation of the top political echelon and the establishment of an inquiry commission" While the impact the protest had on the Israeli government remained uncertain, Israeli Prime Minister Ehud Olmert in a visit to Nahariya promised to invest over 2.5 billion dollars in northern Israel and to establish a commission of inquiry – but fell short of expressly calling it a "state commission" (legally, only a state commission has authority that can supersede the government). Olmert was expected to announce what type of commission will be formed within a short while. On August 25, the Israel Broadcasting Authority reported that a state commission of inquiry is appeared likely to be formed within several days. Olmert was set to decide whether to appoint a governmental commission of inquiry or a more substantive state commission, or some other formula by August 27.

On September 9, tens of thousands participated in a demonstration calling for a state commission, which was held in Rabin Square, Tel Aviv. Among those who delivered speeches were Yossi Sarid and Moshe Arens. Much of the following efforts to establish mechanisms to investigate the war, were undertaken while the protests were active, and their responses to these attempts on the part of Olmert's government, played an important role in shaping public opinion and arguably, the eventual widening mandate of the commission which was formed.

=== Inspection probes ===
On August 28, Olmert announced that there will be no independent state or governmental commission of inquiry. Instead, two internal inspection probes were to be created, one to investigate the political echelon and another to examine the IDF, while a third investigation of the Home Front to be possibly undertaken by the state comptroller Micha Lindenstrauss (although Lindenstrauss, to the "amazement" of the PMO, said that he already has "the authority to investigate the war in Lebanon" and that he "report[s] only to the Knesset"). These were to have a far more limited mandate and narrower authority than a single commission headed by a retired judge. Olmert stated that "we do not have the luxury to submerge in investigating the past. Anyone honestly knows that this is not what would fix the shortcomings." Haaretz noted that Olmert feared an inquiry commission could end up recommending he resigns the primeministership. The Israeli media was largely critical over the probes. Reactions from the protesters were wholly negative.

The governmental and military inspection probes were to be chaired by former director of Mossad, Nahum Admoni, and former chief of staff, Amnon Lipkin-Shahak, respectively. The chairmanship of the governmental probe was originally offered to former minister of education, Amnon Rubinstein, but he refused. Israeli Defense Minister Amir Peretz has already appointed a military inspection probe headed by Shahak, but it ceased operating after a day due to public criticisms. It appears it will be revived in its hitherto composition. The third probe to examine the Home Front was expected to be announced soon thereafter. What was decisive about Olmert's decision was that the commissions were to have limited powers of investigation, censure, and that the political, military and civilian realms were to become split. Critics argued that these inspection probes amounted to a whitewash, due to their limited authority, limited investigatory scope, their self-appointed basis, and that neither will be headed by a retired judge. On August 30, about one hundred Movement for Quality Government members protested in front of the house of the law Professor Yaakov Dror, a member of the governmental inspection probe, calling on him to refuse to participate. Dror told the protesters that he "respects [their] opinion, but they should respect [his]", and said that he is in favour of Olmert's plan.

On September 11, Olmert's appointment of retired judge Eliyahu Winograd to replace Admoni (who was to remain a member, but later resigned) as chair of a governmental commission, was approved by the Attorney General Menachem Mazuz. Winograd is a well-respected former judge who headed various earlier commissions, most recently in March 2005 in an IDF Probe to review the authority of the Military Censor. The Movement for Quality Government said, "Olmert continues a retreat and delay battle" and called on Winograd to decline the appointment, stating, "only a state commission headed by a judge appointed by the Supreme Court is the answer." The Winograd Commission, however, ended up being given a wider mandate than the earlier probe, which is said to amount to de facto state commission investigatory powers.

=== Labour opposition to inspection probes ===
These critics included, from the moderate left: the chair of Meretz-Yachad Yossi Beilin asked that no one testifies before these commissions, while the Movement for Quality Government called them "joke commissions" (in Hebrew joke is "bdicha" and inspection is "bdika", so this is a word play). From the right-national block: Likud stated "it was irrational that the Prime Minister appoints a commission that would investigate the Prime Minister." Former National Religious Party chair Knesset member Ephraim Eitam said that "this an ugly move by the government to escape its responsibility." From the centre-left, several Labour party ministers said they will resist the decision. Minister of Culture, Sports, Science and Technology, Ophir Pines-Paz said the commissions "do not have clear authorities", while Minister without portfolio in charge of the Israel Broadcasting Authority and General Secretary of Labour, Eitan Cabel said that he would call to other Labour ministers to oppose the formula. Haaretz reports that even Minister of Defense and Labour chair Amir Peretz might be considering opposing Olmert and calling for the establishment of a state commission. On August 31, Peretz announced that he opposes Olmert's plan and is in favour of a state commission of inquiry. Despite this opposition, eventually, Labour decided to support Olmert's plan, finding the Winograd Commission worthy although still preferring a formal state commission.

=== Winograd Commission ===
On September 18, the Winograd Commission convened for the first time after having met final approval by the government the day before. On that day, Attorney General Menachem Mazuz stated that the commission does not have the authority to recommend the resignation of the Prime Minister. The next day, the Movement for Quality Government submitted a petition to the Supreme Court, seeking an injunction to disqualify the Winograd Commission. On September 20, reservists heckled Olmert during his Rosh Hashana speech. The Commission held preliminary meetings with key witnesses (many of whom were top political and military decision makers) for about a week. For the next several weeks it reviewed material while deciding on the course and direction of its investigation. On November 2, it began hearing testimonies.

== Criticisms of government failures ==
The demonstrators and other critics alleged significant shortcomings on both the military (led by the Northern Command) and civilian (led by the Home Front Command) fronts. On the latter, this involves the lengthy confinement to inadequate shelters and a lack of evacuation and government-led support, especially for those most in need. On the former, this involved criticisms from the logistical to the operative level. The reserve divisions especially, complained of a lack of or deficient equipment and basic necessities. The Israeli Chief of Staff, Dan Halutz, himself involved in a scandal over the sale of his investment portfolio three hours after the war began, admitted failures. Earlier in the week, IDF Spokesperson clarified that a comment attributed to Israeli Technological and Logistics Directorate chief, Brigadier-General Avi Mizrahi, where he reportedly said that "if our fighters deep in Lebanese territory are left without food or water, I believe they can break into local Lebanese stores to solve that problem", was not made by him. On August 24, Minister of Defense Amir Peretz, called on the IDF to begin developing an anti-rocket system, potentially reviving the Nautilus Mobile Tactical High Energy Laser program which Israeli military experts such as Aluf Yitzhak Ben Yisrael had been calling for since its cancellation.

== Accusations of a right-national agenda ==
The general secretary of Peace Now, Yariv Oppenheimer, accused the reservists of serving a right-national agenda. The reservists denied this charge, and in turn, pointed to Oppenheimer's affiliation with the Labour Party. There were others who argued that the protests were backed by right-national forces, but no conclusive evidence was offered to show the prevalence of any political affiliation among protesters.

== Reserve soldiers and Movement for Quality Government ==
Throughout the protests' duration, the reservists and the Movement for Quality Government were divided by the extent of their demands, with the latter calling for the establishment of a state commission, while the former, joined by parents of soldiers killed in the war, also demanding the government's immediate resignation.

== Decline and inactivity ==
By late September – early October, the protests increasingly dissipated, and virtually disappeared by the time the Winograd Commission began hearing testimonies on early November, it had virtually disappeared. Its impact on the manner in which post-war accountability was sought and will end up being pursued, remains arguably decisive. Following the Winograd Commission's preliminary report on April 30, 2007, on May 4, tens of thousands of protesters gathered to call on Olmert to resign. The demonstration was less seen as reservist-dirven. The reservist groups continued to criticize the government for its "irreparable harm". The chairman of Baltam, Roee Ron, stated that:

To our surprise, after the Second Lebanon War and the Winograd Report, the government and the IDF are advancing a law against reserve duty. The preparedness of the reserve units must be taken care of, and reserve duty should only entail training. Plus, the harm to the soldiers' economic situation, employment and education must be dealt with."

Some reservists have threatened to dodge the draft if key reforms are not implemented.
