= Military operations of the 2006 Lebanon War =

Military operations of the 2006 Lebanon War refer to armed engagements initiated by Israel and Lebanese Hezbollah during the 2006 conflict.

== Lebanon ==
Lebanon's population is 3,874,050. Their annual military expenditures are $540.6 million, which is 3.1% (2004) of GDP. Manpower fit for military service: males age 18-49 (821,762) and females age 18-49 (865,770) (2005 est.) United Nations Resolution 1559 calls for Hezbollah to be disarmed and the Lebanese Army to be deployed to southern Lebanon, which has not been implemented. The Lebanese armed forces as of August 2004 consisted of 72,100, including 70,000 in the army, 1,000 in the air force, and 1,100 in the navy.

As of 2005 the Lebanese Navy had two French EDIC class LST transport ships of 670 ton displacement, five 38 ton Attacker class coastal patrol craft, two Tracker Mk 2 patrol boats of 31 tons, and twenty-five 6 ton inshore patrol craft. Lebanon has no operational fixed wing military aircraft.

See Lebanese Armed Forces for Lebanese armed forces equipment and organization.

According to various media, between 1,000 and 1,200 Lebanese civilians and combatants are reported dead. Additionally, there were between 1500 and 2500 people wounded, and over 1,000,000 were temporarily made refugees, with an unknown number of missing civilians in the south of Lebanon.

=== Hezbollah ===
Hezbollah Defensive System in Southern Lebanon at the start of the war

Hezbollah had an estimated 500,000 personnel as of April 2004. Hezbollah has reportedly obtained large numbers of Russian-made RPG-29 antitank weapons via Syria which are capable of penetrating the armor on Israeli tanks. Their rockets, believed to count 11,000 to 13,000 rounds prior to shelling of Northern Israel, have been described.

==== Hezbollah rocket campaign ====
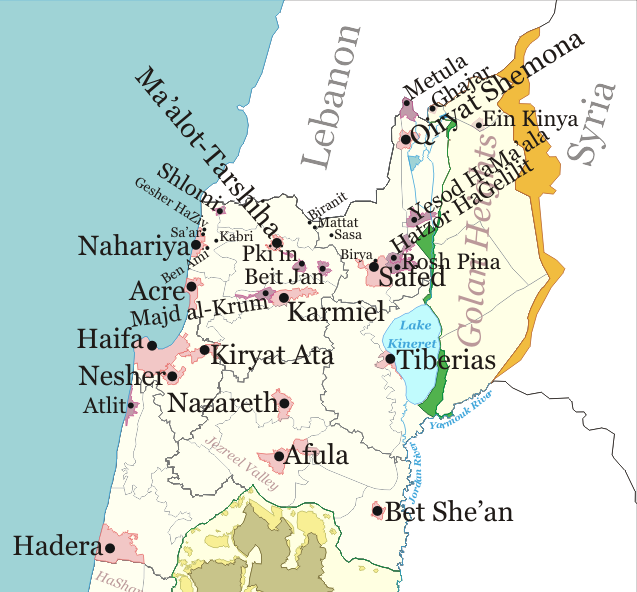
Map showing some of the Israeli localities attacked by rockets fired from Lebanese soil as of Monday 7 August.

As part of the Hezbollah rocket campaign that began in July, they fired rockets into all major cities of northern Israel including Haifa, Hadera, Nazareth, Nazareth Illit, Tiberias, Nahariya, Safed, Afula, Kiryat Shmona, Beit She'an, Karmiel, and Maalot, and dozens of kibbutzim, moshavim, and Druze and Arab villages, as well as the northern West Bank. It also hit a hospital in Safed in northern Galilee on 18 July, wounding 8.

By August 13, 2006, Hezbollah had fired about 3,900 rockets into Israel during the 34 days of the 2006 Lebanon War, killing 44 Israeli civilians and 106 soldiers including 12 reserve soldiers, and wounding some 1400 civilians. According to another report a total of 4,228 Hezbollah rockets hit Israel. Of those 972 (23%) landed within built-up areas. The number of longer range rockets (over 50 km) was approximately 250 (or 6% of the total). Israel suffered 53 fatalities, 250 severely wounded and 2,000 lightly wounded, and hundreds of buildings were damaged.

===== Beginning of campaign =====
On 12 July 2006, Hezbollah members crossed from Lebanon into Israel and ambushed two Israeli Army vehicles, killing three soldiers and capturing two other soldiers. Another five soldiers were killed inside Lebanese territory in a failed rescue attempt. On 14 July, following Israeli bombing raids on Lebanon that killed 60 civilians Hassan Nasrallah said, addressing Israel: "You wanted an open war, and we are heading for an open war. We are ready for it."

On 15 July Israeli Defence Minister Amir Peretz declared martial law throughout northern Israel. Peretz told commanders to prepare civil defense plans and many of the nearly 1,000,000 civilians living in Northern Israel have been sent to bomb shelters or fled their homes to other parts of the country.

===== Events in July 2006 =====
Hezbollah continued to fire more than 1,900 Katyusha rockets and other rockets into northern Israel's towns and cities, including Nahariya, Safed, Hatzor HaGlilit, Rosh Pinna, Kiryat Shmona, and Karmiel, and numerous small agricultural villages.

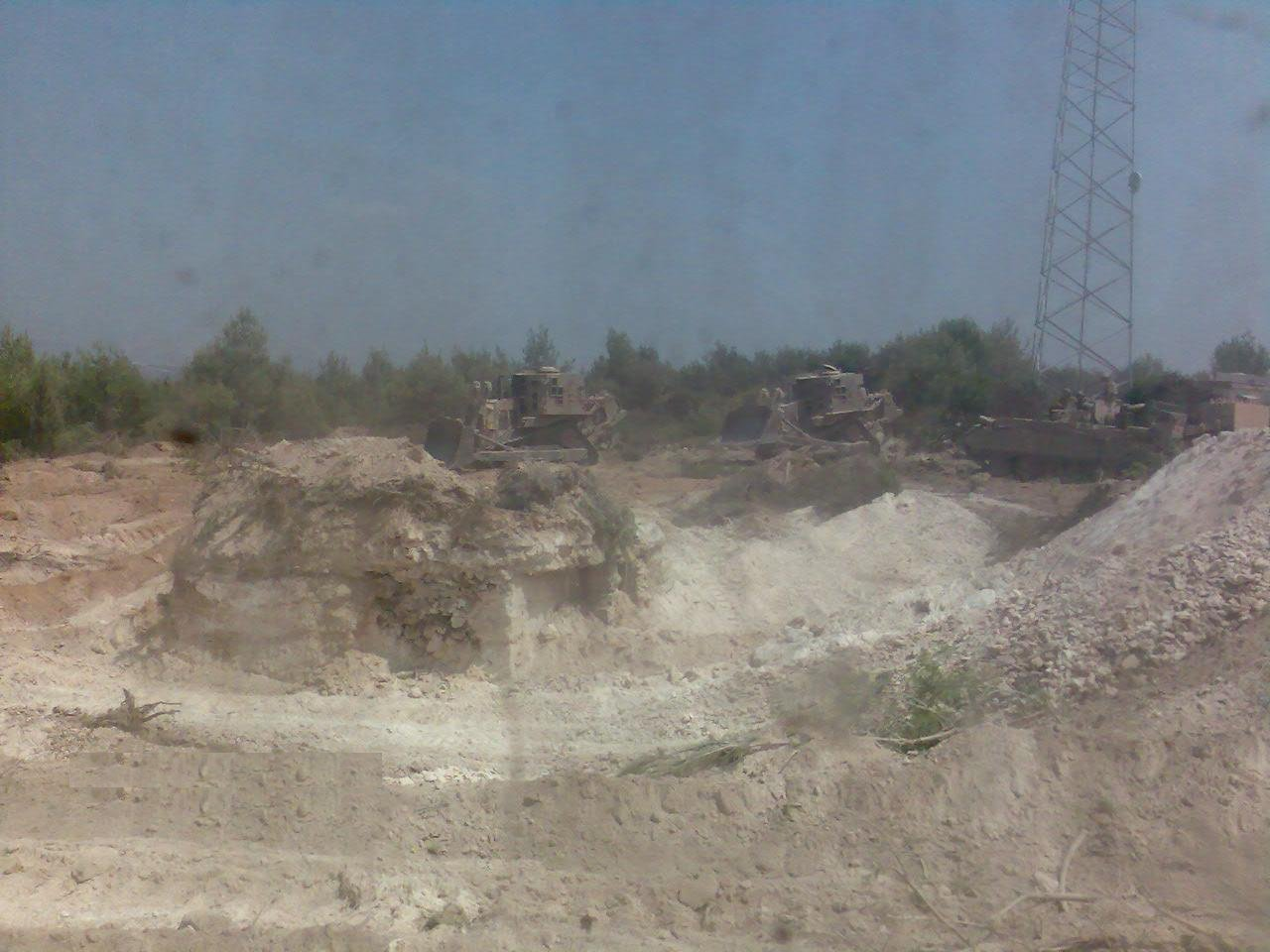
Israeli bulldozers demolish Hezbollah bunker

Hezbollah attacks have penetrated as far south as Hadera in central Israel, as well as Israel's third largest city Haifa, and Atlit and the Jezreel Valley cities of Nazareth and Afula. Al-Manar has reported that the Hezbollah attack included a Fajr-3 and a Ra'ad 1 liquid-fuel missiles, developed by Iran. One of the attacks hit a railroad repair depot, killing eight workers; Hezbollah claimed that this attack was aimed at a large Israeli fuel storage plant adjacent to the railway facility. The plant has not been hit to date. Haifa is home to many strategically valuable facilities such as shipyards and oil refineries, and their targeting by Hezbollah is seen as an escalation.

CNN reported that many of the rockets that missed hitting cities or populated areas often caused forest fires inside Northern Israel.

By July 23, Israeli Magen David Adom emergency teams have been called to 505 rocket landing sites in which they have treated and evacuated 976 casualties (36 fatalities, 19 severely, 39 moderately and 278 lightly injured, and 604 anxiety attacks).

On 25 July Nasrallah announced the beginning of the "second phase of our struggle" in which Hezbollah long-range rockets would "go beyond Haifa," Israel's third-largest city. Israeli officials have been bracing for possible rocket attacks on Tel Aviv, which would mark a major escalation in the conflict. The threat has not been carried out to date, but on 26 July 2006, 60 Iranian volunteers and Basijis set off to join in what they termed a holy war against Israel in Lebanon. The 60 men prayed near Ayatollah Khomeini's mausoleum next to Hezbollah flags prior to departing. The Iranian government has said that it won't deploy regular military personnel.

On 27 July Hezbollah launched 12 Khaibar-1 rockets (Hezbollah designation) at the Israeli town of Afula, which was already hit before. The Khaibar-1 rocket is estimated as having 4 times the power and range of the Katyusha rockets Hezbollah had, up to that point, used. The IDF claim that the Khaibar-1 is a modified Iranian Fajr-5.

30 July reportedly saw over 140 rockets fired from Hezbollah positions into Israel- the most fired on a single day since IDF Operation Change of Direction began. Other sources put the figure of rocket attacks as 146. Commentators in Israeli newspaper Haaretz gave their analysis of what Hezbollah's rocket campaign strategy might be:

"Hezbollah's goals are simple, perhaps even attainable. Continuing the rocket fire, preventing Lebanon from becoming a step in the American vision for a new Middle East, and preventing its own disarmament. The group has no intention of renouncing its weapons in any cease-fire."

===== Events in August 2006 =====
In the beginning of August 2006, Israeli officials believed that its operation has destroyed the vast majority of Hezbollah's longer-range rockets and about a third of the shorter range Katyushas, but the group still has many Katyushas which are smaller and easy to hide or store underground, and can be set up and fired in a few minutes.

Nonetheless, Hezbollah rocket campaign intensified in the beginning of August. On 1 August five unidentified rockets and a number of mortar shells were fired at the western Galilee between Rosh Hanikra and Ma'alot on Tuesday wounding five IDF.

On 2 August 2006 Hezbollah launched its fiercest barrage, firing more than 200 rockets into Israel. On the same day, Mahmoud Qomati, the deputy head of Hezbollah's political bureau, said that "Our missile capacity is still untouched. It is sufficient at two levels, in quantity for the missiles they know of, and in quality for those they still don't know about – the type or the range." He added: "We have enough missiles for months." A Khaibar-1 hit the town of Beit Shean, 70 km (43 mi), south of the Lebanese border and the deepest hit of the rocket campaign to date. This was despite attempts by IDF to move Hezbollah forces north of the Litani. Israeli police released the figure of 160 rocket attacks by 7 am killing one Israeli on a bicycle near the border town of Nahariya. Rockets hit the cities of Tiberias, Maalot, Kiryat Shemona, Carmiel, Rosh Pina and Safed. By 1800hrs Lebanese time 190 rockets were reportedly fired. By 2030 hrs Lebanon time this figure had reportedly risen to 220 rockets. Iranian News Agency FARS reported a total of 300 rocket attacks striking fifteen areas inside Israel.

Hezbollah forces prepare a rocket attack, 2006.

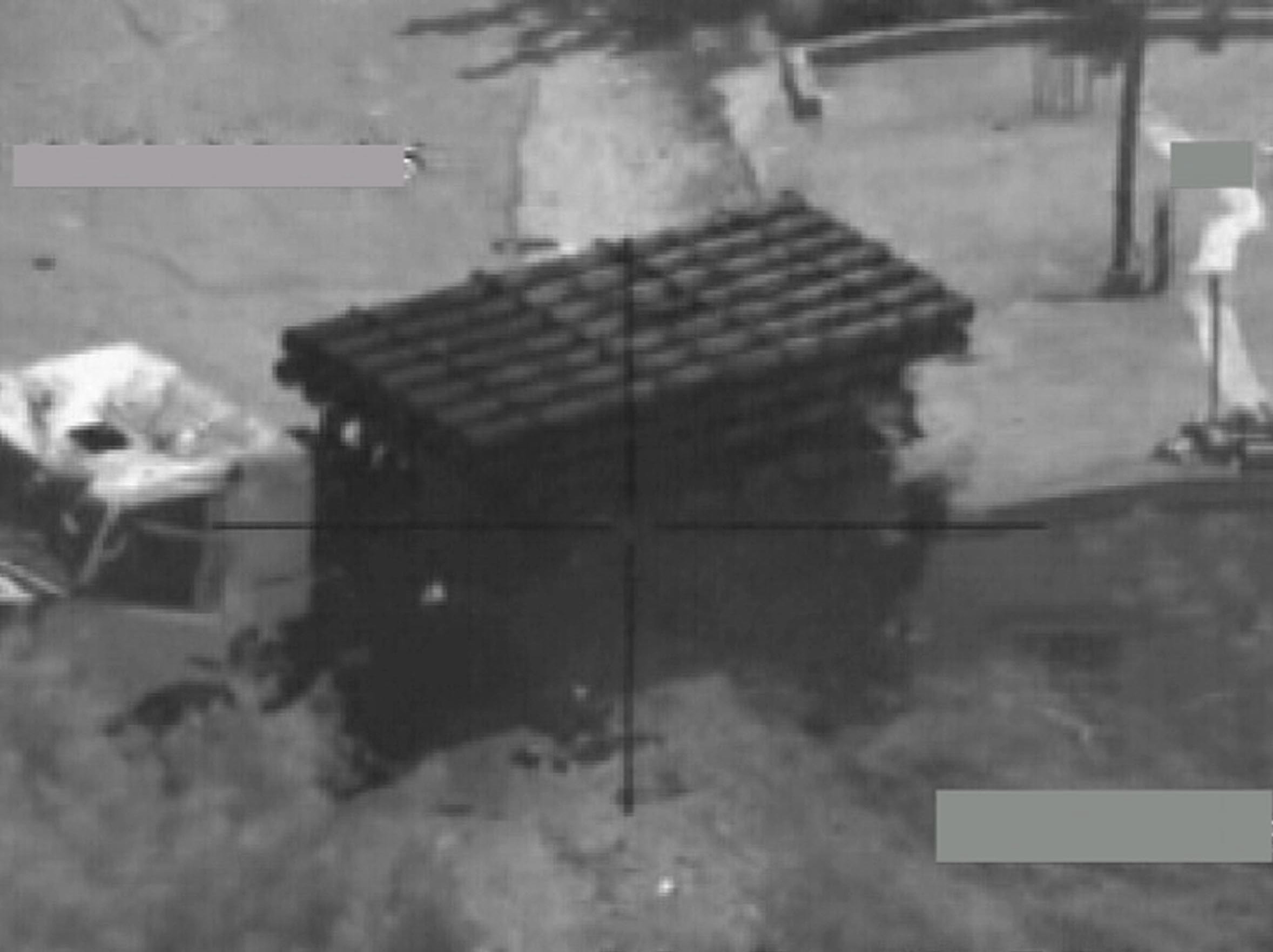
IAF bombs Hezbollah's mobile rocket launcher

On 3 August Hassan Nasrallah vowed to strike Tel Aviv in retaliation for Israel's bombardment of Lebanon's capital, Beirut. "If you hit Beirut, the Islamic resistance will hit Tel Aviv and is able to do that with God's help," Nasrallah said in a televised address. His forces were inflicting "maximum casualties" on Israeli ground troops."

On 4 August it was estimated that the total number of rocket launchers that had been destroyed by IDF forces in Lebanon was "ten" and an estimate of Hezbollah killed given by IDF was "380". On the same day, Hezbollah managed to fire rockets who reached Hadera and Pardes Hana - passing the barrier of the Carmel Mountains, and threatening Tel Aviv more than ever before.

On 5 August number of rockets fired into Israel was given as 170. Mohammed Fneish, a Hezbollah Cabinet minister, said the guerrillas will continue fighting as long as Israeli troops remain in Lebanon. "We abide by it on condition that no Israeli soldier remains inside Lebanese land. If they stay, we will not abide by it."

On 6 August, a rocket, filled with ball bearings, killed 12 Israeli reservist soldiers in Kfar Giladi, near the Lebanese border. Later on the same day Hezbollah launched 5 rockets against Haifa. 3 people were killed and over 100 people were injured in the attack. The rockets hit residential areas in the city, at least one building collapsed.

On 7 August the Israeli Air Force shot down over the Mediterranean Sea an Iranian-made unmanned aerial vehicle (UAV) launched from Lebanon, apparently by Hezbollah.

On 13 August Hezbollah fired two hundred and fifty rockets into Israel.

== Israel ==
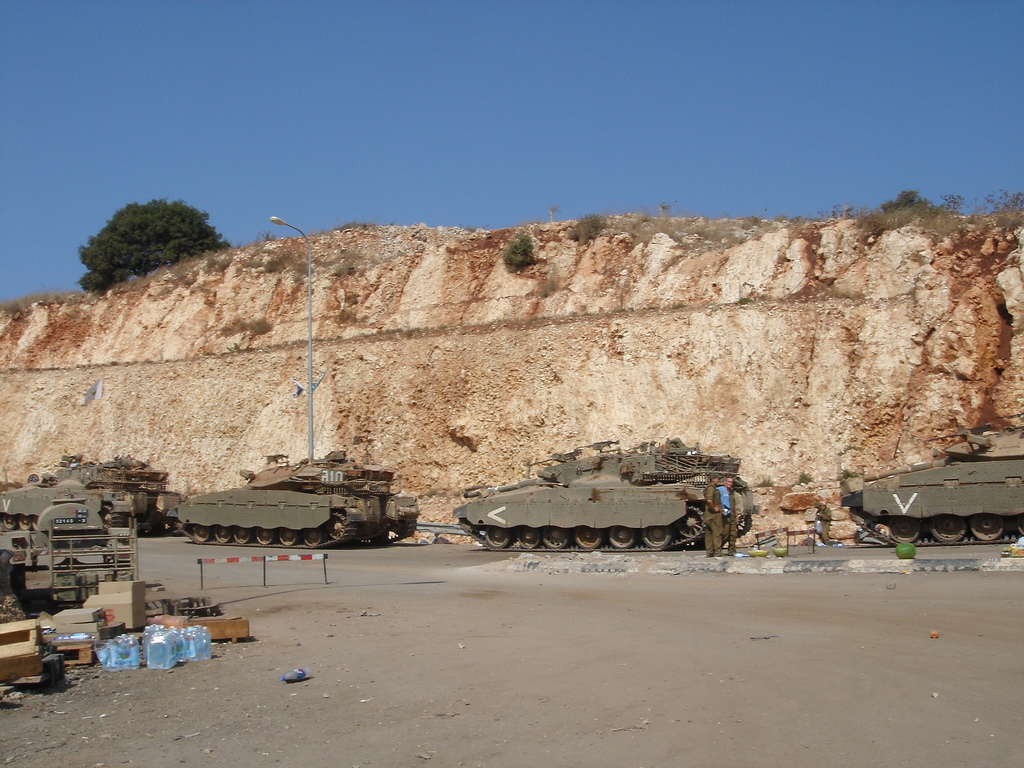
Merkava tanks in northern Israel, August, 2006

Lebanon's civilian infrastructure has also been targeted by the IDF. The international highway between Beirut and Damascus, and bridges, roads, airports, and factories have been bombed several times by the Israeli Air Force. This has led to the disruption of normal life in the country and difficulties in distributing civilian goods. The Rafik Hariri International Airport was among the first of many targets of Israel's campaign in Lebanon. Civilian areas also bore a huge brunt and have been the subject of constant Israeli bombardment. Beirut's southern suburbs, traditionally a Hezbollah stronghold, have been hit numerous times by the IDF and many of its residents have fled. Israel warned Lebanese civilians of Hezbollah strongholds to evacuate their cities ahead of time through leaflets, though there is some debate over the legality and effectiveness of the warnings.

For Israel, the figures were Population: 7,052,117; Military expenditures: $9.45 billion (2005 est.) Israel receives about $3 billion in US military and economic aid per annum. Military expenditures - percent of GDP: 7.7% (2005 est.); Manpower fit for military service: males age 17-49: :1,255,902, females age 17-49: 1,212,394 (2005 est.). The IDF as of August, 2004 had an estimated 168,000 personnel, including 107,500 conscripts. The army had 125,000; the navy had 8,000; the air force had 35,000. Full mobilization to 576,000 could be quickly achieved with the reserves of 408,000.

The Israeli navy had three Dolphin class submarine, three corvettes of 1075 ton displacement with 3-inch (76 mm) guns, eight fast attack craft of 488 ton displacement with 3-inch (76 mm) guns, fifteen coastal patrol craft of 39 ton displacement, two Saar 4 fast attack craft-missile of 415 ton displacement, capable of carrying Harpoon surface to surface missiles with a 70-mile (110 km) range and 227 kg warhead, thirteen 54 ton fast attack craft with surface to surface Hellfire missiles, one 72 ton PTFM, 2 smaller fast attack craft, and three Stingray interceptors of 10.5 ton displacement.

The U.S. is Israel's main foreign arms supplier. According to the Congressional Research Service, $8.4 billion of arms deliveries went to Israel in the 1997-2004 period, with $7.1 billion coming from the United States. U.S. Foreign Military Financing, U.S. grants to Israel, totals about 2.3 billion dollars a year. Israel has purchased from the US a total of over 378 F-16s, and 117 F-15s, 94 A-4 Skyhawk, 110 F-4 Phantoms. On July 21, 2006, it was reported that the U.S. was rushing a delivery of 5,000 pound GBU-28 bunker busting bombs to Israel.

Israel ceased offensive military action since 14 August 2006, one day after Israel accepted the terms of United Nations Security Council Resolution 1701.

=== Initial action ===
According to the Israeli newspaper Haaretz, Israel responded within 2 hours.

"[A] force of tanks and armored personnel carriers was immediately sent into Lebanon in hot pursuit. It was during this pursuit, at about 11:00 A.M... . [a] Merkava tank drove over a powerful bomb, containing an estimated 200 to 300 kilograms (440–660 Lb) of explosives, about 70 meters (230 feet) north of the border fence. The tank was almost completely destroyed, and all four crew members were killed instantly. Over the next several hours, IDF soldiers waged a fierce fight against Hezbollah gunmen... During the course of this battle, at about 3:00 P.M., another soldier was killed and two were lightly wounded."

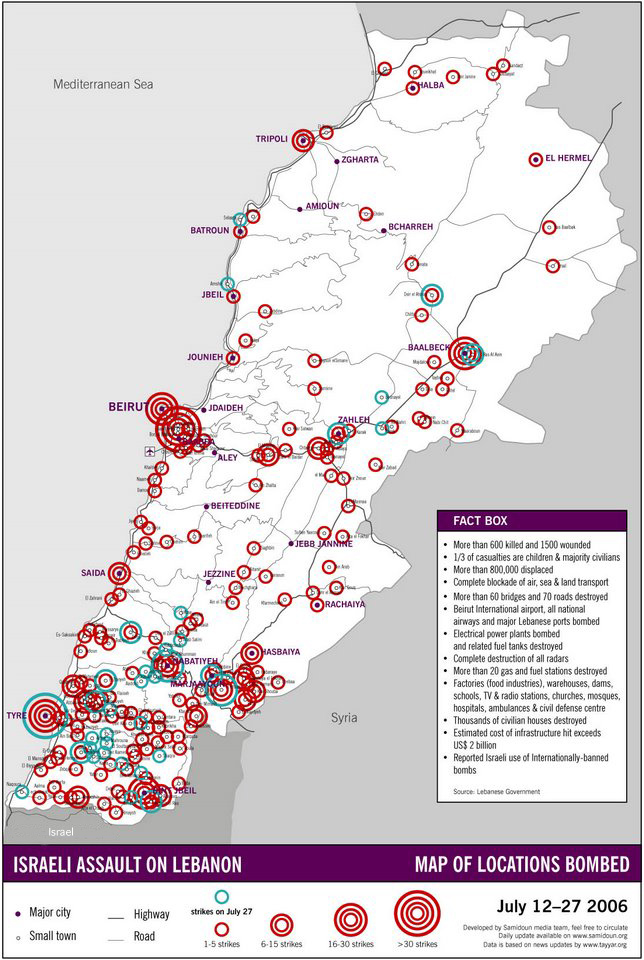
Areas in Lebanon targeted by Israeli bombing, 12 July to 27 July 2006.

Hezbollah released a statement saying "Implementing our promise to free Arab prisoners in Israeli jails, our strugglers have captured two Israeli soldiers in southern Lebanon". Later on, Hassan Nasrallah declared that "No military operation will return them... The prisoners will not be returned except through one way: indirect negotiations and a trade of prisoners."

According to CNN:

The Israeli Cabinet authorized "severe and harsh" retaliation on Lebanon ... Israel's chief of staff, Lt. Gen. Dan Halutz, told Israel's Channel 10, "If the soldiers are not returned, we will turn Lebanon's clock back 20 years."

According to the Washington Post:

But retired Israeli army Col. Gal Luft, a former commander in the town of Ramallah, said, "Israel is attempting to create a rift between the Lebanese population and Hezbollah supporters by exacting a heavy price from the elite in Beirut. The message is: If you want your air conditioning to work and if you want to be able to fly to Paris for shopping, you must pull your head out of the sand and take action toward shutting down Hezbollah-land."

Israeli Prime Minister Ehud Olmert declared the attack by Hezbollah's military wing an "act of war", and promised Lebanon a "very painful and far-reaching response." Israeli Defense Minister Amir Peretz also said that "the State of Israel sees itself free to use all measures that it finds it needs, and the Israeli Forces have been given orders in that direction."

Israel said it held the Beirut government responsible for the attack, but Prime Minister Fuad Siniora denied any knowledge of the raid and stated that he did not condone it. An emergency meeting of the Lebanese government reaffirmed this position.

The Israeli government also began a public relations initiative in the press and the internet to promote and explain its actions in Lebanon, a practice known as hasbara. The Israeli Foreign Ministry coordinated the efforts of "trainee diplomats" and international Jewish and evangelical Christian groups to track and influence websites, chatrooms, and polls pertaining to the 2006 Israel-Lebanon conflict as well as the 2006 Israel-Gaza conflict using the so-called "megaphone software". Ron Schleifer described how Israel engaged in psychological warfare, which was an "inseparable part of its military operations."

=== Subsequent military actions ===
Early on 13 July 2006 Israel sent IDF jets to bomb Lebanon's international airport near Beirut, forcing its closure and diverting its arriving flights to Cyprus. Hezbollah then bombarded the Israeli towns of Nahariya and Safed, as well as villages nearby with rocket fire. The attacks killed two civilians and wounded 29 more. Nahariya residents began leaving the city en masse in fear of further Katyusha attacks. Israel imposed an air and sea blockade on Lebanon, and has bombed the main Beirut–Damascus highway.

On 14 July, following Israeli bombing raids on Lebanon which result in killing 60 civilians Nasrallah said, addressing Israel: "You wanted an open war, and we are heading for an open war. We are ready for it."

On Sunday evening Hezbollah militants attempted to infiltrate an Israel Defense Forces post on the Lebanese Border.

Israel Defense Forces Chief of Staff Dan Halutz said that the ground operations would be limited.

On 23 July 2006, Israeli land forces crossed into Lebanon in the Maroun al-Ras area, which overlooks several other sites said to have been used as launch pads for Hezbollah rockets.

It was reported on 24 July that the United States was in the process of providing Israel with "bunker buster" bombs, which would allegedly be used to target the leader of Lebanon's Hezbollah guerrilla group and destroy its trenches.

On 25 July Hassan Nasrallah, Hezbollah's secretary general, said the Israeli onslaught was an attempt by the US and Israel to "impose a new Middle East" in which Lebanon would be under US hegemony.

On 25 July IDF forces attacked Bint Jbeil, the most important shiite city near the border. Some sources claimed they entered the city, but the battle continued for several days. On 27 July a deadly clash happened in city and 8 Israeli soldiers and some of the Hezbollah militias were killed. Finally IDF withdrew from this area on 29 July.

The EU has warned Israel about disproportionate attacks against Lebanon. In addition spokespersons from the United Nations, the European Union, the Organisation of Islamic Cooperation and an assortment of human rights organizations have condemned Israel for its "disproportionate" response to Hezbollah's attacks. However, speaking on Israeli army radio, Justice Minister Haim Ramon - a close confidant of Israeli Prime Minister Ehud Olmert - said "everyone understands that a victory for Hezbollah is a victory for world terror." He said that in order to prevent casualties amongst Israeli soldiers battling Hezbollah militants in southern Lebanon, Hezbollah positions should be targeted by the Israeli air force before ground troops move in. "All those now in south Lebanon are terrorists who are related in some way to Hezbollah," Mr Ramon said. Mr Ramon's call for the use of greater firepower came as the Israeli cabinet was set to decide whether to broaden its military offensive.

According to Human Rights Watch, many Lebanese people can not flee from the south because roads are under Israeli attack which Israel defends claiming that such attacks will obstruct Hezbollah from transporting arms. HRW says that according to their observations and reports from independent new source, none of the attacks on vehicles resulted in Hezbollah killings or the hindrance in the transportation of weapons. Instead, those who were killed and wounded in Israeli artillery and aerial attacks were civilians attempting to evacuate after receiving the leaflets; many of the civilian vehicles attacked were flying white flags. Furthermore, many Lebanese are not able to leave due to illness, wounds sustained in Israeli attacks, or providing services to civilians. HRW asserted that warnings in advance do not justify Israel's targeting of and attacks on civilians. In a report released on August 3, 2006, HRW researchers analyzed more than 20 Israeli attacks on civilians and concluded that "in many cases, Israeli forces struck an area with no apparent military target. In some instances, Israeli forces appear to have deliberately targeted civilians" and that such attacks are war crimes.

The Lebanese environment minister has said that a strike on a power station in Lebanon, and the resultant oil leak have had bad effects and "It's without doubt the biggest environmental catastrophe that the Mediterranean has known."

Israeli soldiers have also landed in Baalbeck.

=== Preparations ===
In the August 2006 edition of The New Yorker, Pulitzer Prize winning investigative journalist Seymour Hersh claimed that Israeli government officials travelled to the US in May to share plans for attacking Hizbullah. Quoting a US government consultant, Hersh said: "Earlier this summer ... several Israeli officials visited Washington, separately, 'to get a green light for the bombing operation and to find out how much the United States would bear'." Both US and Israeli officials denied the claims. Haaretz reported in March 2007 that Prime Minister Ehud Olmert testified to the Winograd Commission that several meetings regarding Hezbollah were held upon his taking office, and that in response to the likely scenario of soldiers again being abducted, he chose one of several plans of action instead of having to make a snap-judgement if and when such a scenario occurred.

== See also ==
- 2006 Israel-Gaza conflict
- International reactions to the 2006 Lebanon War
- Israel-Lebanon conflict
- Lebanese Civil War
- Operation Accountability
- Operation Grapes of Wrath
- Timeline of the 2006 Lebanon War
- UNIFIL United Nations Interim Forces in Lebanon
