= Siniora Plan =

Truce plan for the 2006 Lebanon War by Prime Minister Fuad Siniora

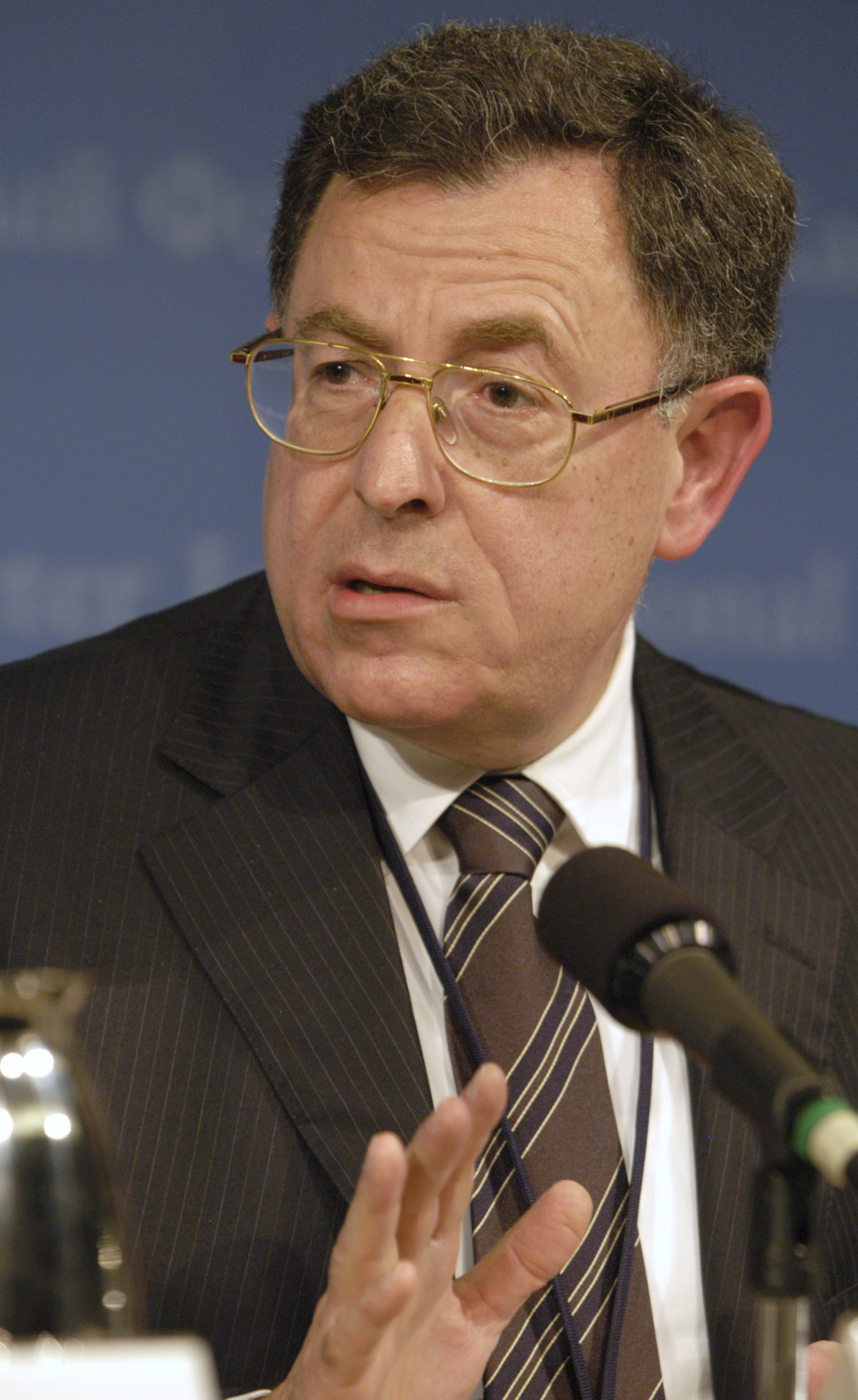
Lebanon's Prime Minister Fouad Siniora.

The Siniora Plan was the unofficial name of the 7-point truce plan for the 2006 Lebanon War that was presented by Lebanon's Prime Minister Fuad Siniora at the 15-nation conference in Rome on 27 July 2006.

The Siniora Plan called for a mutual release of Lebanese and Israeli prisoners and detainees, an immediate withdrawal of the Israeli ground troops behind the Blue Line, that the disputed Shebaa Farms area would be placed under UN jurisdiction until the ownership issue had been settled, that Israel handed over all remaining maps showing their landmines in southern Lebanon, that the Lebanese army took full control over southern Lebanon, and that a strong multi-national force under the UN is given the necessary powers (including operating under Chapter 7 of the UN Charter, which allows the use of force) to guarantee stability and security.

On 4 August, the United States and France presented a draft UN Security Council resolution attempting to resolve the conflict. Contrary to the Siniora Plan, the draft resolution did not require Israel to withdraw from southern Lebanon until an international force was in place; it said that Israel needed only to cease all "offensive" military activities, while it demanded that Hezbollah cease all military activities; and it demanded that Hezbollah immediately released captured Israelis, while stating that the issue regarding captured Lebanese was to be resolved at a later stage. Lebanon's reaction to the draft was very negative.

On 7 August, at an emergency meeting of the Arab League in Beirut, the Siniora Plan was further detailed, by specifying that 15,000 Lebanese Army troops would fill the void in southern Lebanon between an Israeli withdrawal and the arrival of the international force. This way, the Lebanese government hoped to dispel the claim that the Israeli forces had to remain in Lebanon until the international force had arrived, and thus make the Siniora Plan a more viable alternative to the draft UN resolution. The number of soldiers corresponded with what Israeli Prime Minister Ehud Olmert earlier had said that the size of the international force would need to be.

The Siniora Plan received the backing of the EU and the Arab League, including countries such as Syria and Jordan. It was also supported by Hezbollah, while it was disliked by Iran. Initially, Israel didn't like the Siniora Plan, but when the 15,000 Lebanese troops were added, the Israeli Prime Minister Ehud Olmert called it "an interesting step".

On 8 August, a delegation from the Arab League visited the United Nations to urge for changes of the draft resolution in accordance with the Siniora Plan. The Arab view caused France to change its view on the draft proposal, and a growing rift between France and the US was reported, with France threatening to put forward a new draft resolution if the current one wasn't revised to reflect important elements of the Siniora Plan.

On 11 August, a much revised draft resolution was presented, incorporating many elements from the Siniora Plan. It was adopted unanimously by the UN Security Council as United Nations Security Council Resolution 1701. On 12 August, both the Lebanese government and Hezbollah accepted the UN resolution, and on 13 August the Israeli government did the same.

Below is the official English wording of the Siniora Plan, from the Lebanese government's "Rebuild Lebanon" website:

1. An undertaking to release the Lebanese and Israeli prisoners and detainees through the ICRC.
2. The withdrawal of the Israeli army behind the Blue Line, and the return of the displaced to their villages.
3. A commitment from the Security Council to place the Shebaa Farms area and the Kfarshouba Hills under UN jurisdiction until border delineation and Lebanese sovereignty over them are fully settled. While in UN custody, the area will be accessible to Lebanese property owners there. Further, Israel surrenders all remaining landmine maps in South Lebanon to the UN.
4. The Lebanese government extends its authority over its territory through its own legitimate armed forces, such that there will be no weapons or authority other than that of the Lebanese state as stipulated in the Taef national reconciliation document.
5. The UN international force, operating in South Lebanon, is supplemented and enhanced in numbers, equipment, mandate and scope of operation, as needed, in order to undertake urgent humanitarian and relief work and guarantee stability and security in the south so that those who fled their homes can return.
6. The UN, in cooperation with the relevant parties, undertakes the necessary measures to once again put into effect the Armistice Agreement signed by Lebanon and Israel in 1949, and to insure adherence to the provisions of that agreement, as well as to explore possible amendments to or development of said provisions, as necessary.
7. The international community commits to support Lebanon on all levels, and to assist it in facing the tremendous burden resulting from the human, social and economic tragedy which has afflicted the country, especially in the areas of relief, reconstruction and rebuilding of the national economy.
