= United Nations Security Council Resolution 1701 =

2006 resolution on resolving the 2006 Lebanon War

UN Security Council Resolution 1701
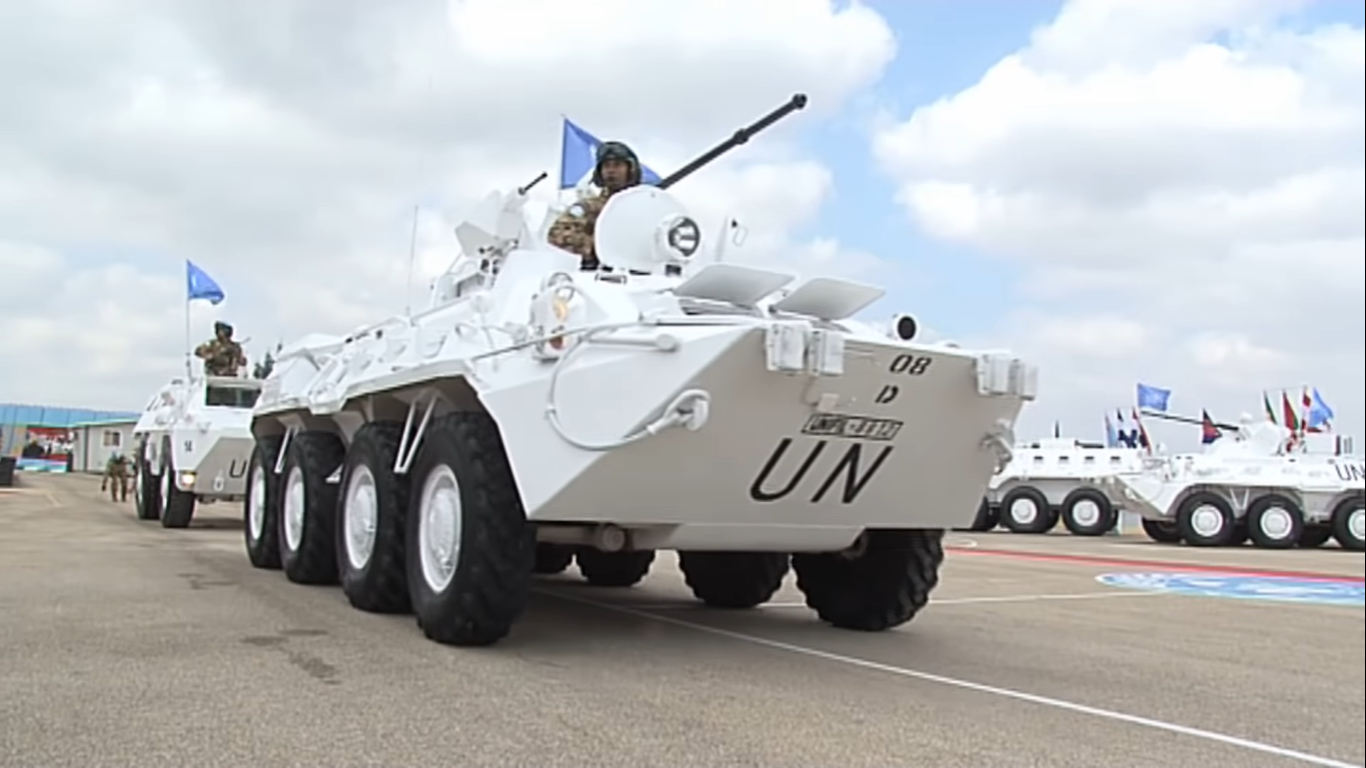
- UNIFIL forces
- Date: 11 August 2006
- Meeting no.: 5,511
- Code: S/RES/1701 (Document)
- Subject: The situation in the Middle East
- Voting summary: 15 voted for; None voted against; None abstained
- Result: Adopted

Security Council composition
- Permanent members: China; France; Russia; United Kingdom; United States
- Non-permanent members: Argentina; Rep. of the Congo; Denmark; Ghana; Greece; Japan; Peru; Qatar; Slovakia; Tanzania

United Nations Security Council Resolution 1701 is a resolution that was intended to resolve the 2006 Lebanon War. The resolution calls for a full cessation of hostilities between Israel and Hezbollah, the withdrawal of Israeli forces from Lebanon, with no armed forces other than UNIFIL and Lebanese military south of the Litani River, which flows about 29 km (18 mi) north of the border (the latter implies a withdrawal of Hezbollah from that area), and the disarmament of Hezbollah and other armed groups. It emphasizes Lebanon's need to fully exert government control and calls for efforts to address the unconditional release of abducted Israeli soldiers.

It was unanimously approved by the United Nations Security Council on 11 August 2006. The Lebanese cabinet unanimously approved the resolution on 12 August 2006. On the same day, Hezbollah leader Hassan Nasrallah said that his militia would honor the call for a ceasefire. He also said that once the Israeli offensive stops, Hezbollah's rocket attacks on Israel would stop. On 13 August, the Israeli Cabinet voted 24–0 in favor of the resolution, with one abstention. The ceasefire began on Monday, 14 August 2006 at 8 AM local time, after increased attacks by both sides.

As of 2024, the resolution was not fully implemented. Hezbollah and other armed groups in southern Lebanon have not withdrawn at all; in particular, Hezbollah has since significantly increased their weapons capabilities, amassing approx. 120,000–200,000 munitions (short-range guided ballistic missiles, short- and intermediate-range unguided ballistic missiles, and short- and long-range unguided rockets), and has increased the deployment of its armed forces south of the Litani River, developing tunnels, weapon stashes, airstrips and military installations. Lebanon has also accused Israel of not fully withdrawing from Lebanese territories (northern part of Ghajar village, the Shebaa Farms, and the Kfarchouba hills), and of violating their air and maritime borders.

== Background ==
Israeli diplomat Tal Becker wrote a proposal for a "diplomatic exit" on the second day of the war. Becker's proposal eventually became the basis of UNSCR 1701.

=== 6–8 August ===
Lebanon's Prime Minister Fouad Siniora said on 6 August that a draft resolution written by the United States and France was "not adequate," and Lebanese House Speaker Nabih Berri, serving as a diplomatic conduit for Hezbollah, rejected the draft. The draft made no mention of Israeli forces withdrawing from Lebanon.

Lebanon proposed on 7 August that it would send 15,000 troops to its southern border if Israeli troops would leave the country, handing over their positions to the UN Interim Force. The draft UN resolution called for "the immediate cessation by Hezbollah of all attacks and the immediate cessation by Israel of all offensive military operations." A second resolution would later establish an international peacekeeping force that would help Lebanon's army take control of the country's southern border, where Hezbollah had held sway since the Israeli withdrawal in 2000.

The resolution stated that Israeli forces shall withdraw in parallel with the deployment of Lebanese and UNIFIL forces into the southern Lebanon, and established that the Lebanese government should have control over all Lebanese territory, and that "there will be no weapons without the consent of the government of Lebanon and no authority other than that of the government of Lebanon."

On 8 August, several changes were made to the proposal. Lebanon and its Arab League allies pressed the UN to call for an immediate Israeli withdrawal. Such a withdrawal had not been mentioned in the draft resolution; an omission that Lebanon's government and Arab League diplomats called unacceptable. The Lebanese proposal also called for Israel to temporarily give control of Shebaa Farms to the UN.

=== 9–11 August ===
Dan Gillerman, Israel's Ambassador to the UN, said he had problems with the idea of a UN force being deployed to stabilize the region, and pointed to the UN Interim Force in Lebanon as an example. Israel's Security Cabinet recommended that the Israeli military expand its campaign against Hezbollah in southern Lebanon. Diplomats at the UN and in Beirut stepped up efforts to secure a UN resolution.

=== 12 August ===
Despite the expanded ground campaign, the Israeli Security Cabinet was likely to sign off on the UN resolution at its meeting on 13 August, Israel's Ambassador to the US, Daniel Ayalon, said before the Council vote. A final text of the resolution was distributed to the full UN Security Council, which unanimously accepted the resolution.

The resolution demands a full cessation of all hostilities, the release of abducted Israeli soldiers, the deployment of 15,000 international troops to police the Lebanon-Israel border—an increase from the then-current 2,000. The UN troops in the area would be joined by 15,000 Lebanese troops. The deal also calls for the release of two Israeli soldiers whose capture by guerrillas sparked the conflict. Tzipi Livni, Israel's foreign minister, insisted that Israeli troops would remain in southern Lebanon until a multinational UN force is deployed, implying that deployment of Lebanese forces would not be sufficient for Israeli withdrawal.

== Resolution ==
The resolution calls for:

- Full cessation of hostilities (OP1)
- Israel to withdraw all of its forces from Lebanon in parallel with Lebanese and UNIFIL soldiers deploying throughout the South (OP2)
- A long-term solution based on (OP8)
  - Disarmament of all armed groups in Lebanon (implying Hezbollah)
  - No armed forces other than UNIFIL and Lebanese (implying Hezbollah and Israeli forces) will be south of the Litani River
  - No foreign forces in Lebanon without the consent of its government
  - Provision to the United Nations of all maps of land mines in Lebanon in Israel's possession

The Resolution at the same time also emphasizes:

- The importance of full control of Lebanon by the government of Lebanon (OP3)
- The need to address urgently the unconditional release of the abducted Israeli soldiers, that have given rise to the current crisis.

The resolution also reiterates the Security Council's strong support for

- Full respect for the Blue Line (OP 4)
- The territorial integrity, sovereignty and political independence of Lebanon within its internationally recognized borders (OP 5)

== Disarmament of armed groups in Lebanon ==
The Resolution calls for "full implementation of the relevant provisions of the Taif Accords, and of resolutions 1559 (2004) and 1680 (2006), that require the disarmament of all armed groups in Lebanon, so that, pursuant to the Lebanese cabinet decision of July 27, 2006, there will be no weapons or authority in Lebanon other than that of the Lebanese state."

=== Hezbollah ===
Hezbollah came into existence in 1985 as a result of the Israeli occupation of South Lebanon which began in 1982 and lasted until 2000.

On 14 August, Hezbollah's leader, Hassan Nasrallah, said on Hezbollah's Al-Manar TV that he is not in favor of Hezbollah's disarmament, since the Lebanese army is not strong enough to defend Lebanon and the Israeli army is still occupying Lebanon, and that his fighters would not be forced to disarm by "intimidation or pressure." Similarly, after adoption of the resolution Lebanese Defence Minister Elias Murr said on 14 August 2006, in a television interview that "the army won't be deployed to south Lebanon to disarm Hezbollah."

Soon after the resolution's passage, both the UN and UNIFIL contributing nations such as France disclaimed responsibility for disarming Hezbollah. Kofi Annan, then Secretary-General of the United Nations, asserted that "dismantling Hezbollah is not the direct mandate of the UN," which could only help Lebanon disarm the organization. Annan then said on 25 August 2006, "The understanding was that it would be the Lebanese who would disarm [Hezbollah]" and that "Obviously, if at some stage they need advice or some help from the international community and they were to approach us, we would consider it, but the troops are not going in there to disarm."

Israel, for its part, indicated that if Hezbollah is not disarmed as called for in the Resolution, Israel would continue their efforts. Israeli Foreign Ministry spokesman Mark Regev told the Associated Press on 18 August that Israel is keeping its commitments in the UN ceasefire resolution and expects Lebanon to do the same. "That resolution clearly calls for the creation of a Hezbollah-free zone south of the Litani River, and anything less would mean that the resolution is not being implemented," Regev told AP.

Hezbollah agreed to disarm its forces south of the Litani River, but not to pull its forces out of southern Lebanon. "Hezbollah individuals are people who live in the south and they will not leave their homes and villages, but an armed Hezbollah will not be in the south," said Mohamad Chatah on 16 August, a senior adviser to Lebanese Prime Minister Siniora. UN Resolution 1701 prohibits all armed militias from operating anywhere in all of Lebanon ("no weapons or authority in Lebanon other than that of the Lebanese state" and "full implementation of the relevant provisions of the Taif Accords, and of resolutions 1559 and 1680, that require the disarmament of all armed groups in Lebanon, so that, pursuant to the Lebanese cabinet decision of 27 July 2006, there will be no weapons or authority in Lebanon other than that of the Lebanese State"), but does not specify whether the militias should disarm or be put under the control of the Lebanese government. Annan met with Israeli Foreign Minister Tzipi Livni, who said that the "ball is now in the court of the government of Lebanon" to ensure no armed militias operate in southern Lebanon.

On 21 August, the Turkish newspaper Hürriyet reported that Turkish authorities intercepted five Iranian cargo aircraft and one Syrian aircraft carrying missiles to Hezbollah. The aircraft were forced to land at Diyarbakır Airport in southeastern Turkey. The aircraft were not allowed to take off after US intelligence sources found there were three missile launchers and crates of C-802 missiles on board the planes which were identical to the missile that struck the Israeli Navy Ship "Hanit" during the war. Israeli Defense Minister Amir Peretz said that Israel would continue to prevent weapons from reaching Hezbollah from Syria and Iran. "I will not allow the situation that happened before the war to return," said Peretz during a meeting with Turkish Foreign Minister Abdullah Gul. He also asked that Turkey send troops to the international force deploying in Lebanon.

In January 2007, Israeli military intelligence chief Maj.-Gen. Amos Yadlin criticized both Hezbollah for rearming and the United Nations for "doing nothing to prevent it or disarm them."

=== Fatah ===
The Lebanese government demanded that Palestinians in refugee camps in the Litani area disarm in accordance with the resolution, senior Fatah operative in Lebanon, Monir Al-Makdah, said on 28 August 2006. Reportedly, Lebanese Prime Minister Fouad Siniora "made the request to Fatah representative in Lebanon, Abbas Za'aki. Al-Makdah rejected the demand in an interview with Jordanian newspaper Al-Dostur, saying that the Security Council resolution was illegal since it did not include the right of return for Palestinian refugees."

== New UN troops for UNIFIL II ==
On 30 June 2006, UNIFIL was made up of 1,990 troops from China, France, Ghana, India, Ireland, Italy, Poland, and Ukraine, supported by 50 military observers from UN Truce Supervision Organization and about 400 civilian staff members.

As of 8 January 2007, UNIFIL has grown to 11,512 military personnel from the following nations: Belgium (375; 394 pledged), China (190), Denmark (78, warships; 150 pledged), Finland (205), France (2,000), Germany (1,500, surveillance ships and planes; 2,400 pledged), Ghana (660), Greece (225), Guatemala (1), Hungary (4), India (878), Indonesia (850), Ireland (164), Italy (2,415; commands UNIFIL forces), Luxembourg (2), Malaysia (220; 360 pledged), Nepal (234), Netherlands (161), Norway (134), Poland (319), Portugal (146, military construction engineers), Qatar (200), Slovenia (11), Spain (1,277, armored vehicles), South Korea (270 special forces pledged, 80 support personnel pledged), Sweden (68, and a ship), Turkey (509), and Ukraine (200), supported by 53 military observers from UN Truce Supervision Organization and about 308 local civilian staff members.

Other countries have been reported as willing to send troops, but have not shared troop numbers. They include: Australia, Bangladesh, Bulgaria (160 frigate crew members), Latvia, Lithuania, Morocco, New Zealand, Russia (400) and Thailand.

Israel indicated that it is not in favor of troops being included from countries that have offered to send troops but do not recognize Israel as a state, such as Bangladesh, Indonesia, and Malaysia.

== Deployment of UNIFIL II ==
The Resolution, in Paragraph 2, "calls upon the Government of Lebanon and UNIFIL as authorized by paragraph 11 to deploy their forces together throughout the South."

Paragraph 11 then states that Security Council decided: "that the [UNIFIL II] force shall, in addition to carrying out its mandate under resolutions 425 and 426 (1978): ... (b) Accompany and support the Lebanese armed forces as they deploy throughout the South, including along the Blue Line ... (c) Coordinate its activities related to paragraph 11(b) with the Government of Lebanon and the Government of Israel ...."

Complicating matters, Syria threatened to close their border with Lebanon if UN troops were sent in.

Syrian President Bashar al-Assad also warned that deploying foreign troops along the border would be a "hostile" act against Syria.

"At the moment we are seeing some very unconstructive signals from Syria," Germany's Chancellor Angela Merkel said.

As for the UN's position, however, Annan advanced the view afterward that the resolution did not require the UN to deploy UNIFIL II anywhere unless invited to do so by the Lebanese government. He said on 25 August, however: "the resolution does not require deployment of UN troops to the [Syria]n border. It indicates that, if the Lebanese government were to ask for it, we should assist. The Lebanese Government has not made any such request."

== Initial reactions ==
Leaders around the world praised the agreement, while noting this was not the end of the crisis. The Lebanese cabinet voted unanimously to accept the terms on 12 August. Nasrallah, in a speech televised on Hezbollah's Al-Manar television on 12 August, said: "We will not be an obstacle to any decision taken by the Lebanese government".

The Israeli government accepted the terms on 13 August, but did not cease offensive actions until its deadline at 8:00 a.m. (local time) 14 August. On 13 August, Israel advanced to capture as much high-ground territory as possible before the ceasefire, and bombed targets up to 15 minutes before the deadline. Hezbollah also continued what they called "defensive operations," and vowed not to cease their operations as long as Israel occupies Lebanon.

The French government criticized the rules of engagement. "I remember the unhappy experiences of other operations where UN forces had neither a sufficiently precise mission nor the means to act," French Defence Minister, Michèle Alliot-Marie, said. "You cannot send out men and tell them that they should watch what's happening but that they have no right to defend themselves or fire."

== Aftermath ==
The clauses of the resolution calling for the disarmament of all non-state actors in Lebanon and for the area between the Israel-Lebanon border and the Litani River to be cleared of all armed actors other than the Lebanese army and UNIFIL were never implemented. After the 2006 war ended, Hezbollah amassed an arsenal of 150,000 rockets and missiles and has tens of thousands of fighters.

In the UN's 2015 report on the matter, it states that:

The situation in the area of operations of the United Nations Interim Force in Lebanon (UNIFIL) and along the Blue Line remained generally calm, despite the tense regional context and following the serious breach of the cessation of hostilities between Lebanon and Israel on 28 January. Overall, despite escalatory rhetoric on both sides, the Lebanese and Israeli authorities displayed resolve to maintain calm along the Blue Line, continued to engage constructively with UNIFIL through the established liaison and coordination arrangements and reaffirmed their commitment to the implementation of resolution 1701 (2006). There was no progress, however, on their outstanding obligations under the resolution and no movement towards a permanent ceasefire.

It states that "Israeli violations of Lebanese airspace continued almost daily with unmanned aerial vehicles, and often with fixed-wing aircraft, including fighter jets".

On the Lebanese side, it noted: "In accordance with its mandate, UNIFIL does not proactively search for weapons in the south" and "UNIFIL observed civilians with unauthorized weapons in the area of operation...Those mostly involved individuals carrying hunting weapons. However, there were a number of instances where small arms, including rifles and, at least on one occasion, rocket-propelled grenades, were fired during commemorative events, including funerals".

It also noted: "The maintenance of arms by Hizbullah and other groups outside the control of the Lebanese State" violates the resolution. Hizbullah states that such weaponry "serves as a deterrent against potential aggression from Israel"."

In 2011, following the appointment of Najib Mikati as Prime Minister of Lebanon, the United Nations reiterated its call on Lebanon to adhere to the terms of Resolution 1701.

=== Alleged Hezbollah violations ===
Israel says that Hezbollah routinely violates the resolution by bringing its forces south of the Litani River, sometimes to the border with Israel. In 2018, the Israeli Defence Force uncovered miles of underground Hezbollah tunnels into Israel from Southern Lebanon. Hezbollah leader Hassan Nasrallah said "Part of our plan in the next war is to enter into Galilee, a part of our plan we are capable of, God willing. The important thing is that we have this capability and we have had it for years".

As of February 2009, many key points in the resolution remained insufficiently addressed. In a special report, United Nations Secretary-General Ban Ki-Moon mentions that "Hezbollah continues to refuse to provide any information on the release or fate of abducted soldiers, and places conditions and demands for the release that are far outside the scope of resolution 1701," Ban wrote in the report. The report also points out that Hezbollah has replenished its stock of rockets and missiles in South Lebanon, and is now in possession of 10,000 long-range rockets and 20,000 short-range projectiles. The latest Israeli estimate of Hezbollah's rocket stockpile puts it at approx. 150,000.

The United Nations has been criticised for failing to implement Resolution 1701 and its failure to dismantle or disarm Hezbollah and for failing to prevent it from deploying forces south of the Litani river per Resolution 1701. According to one analyst, "since 2006, Hezbollah has instead fortified southern Lebanon, particularly towns and villages along the 120-kilometer-long (about 75-mile-long) demarcation line. It has built unauthorized firing ranges, stocked rockets in civilian infrastructure, built tunnels into Israel, and repeatedly stopped UNIFIL from accessing certain areas." Since the 7 October Hamas massacre in Israel, Hezbollah has continued to fire hundreds of rockets into civilian areas of Northern Israel. Approx. 300,000 Israeli civilians have been internally displaced and forced to flee south as a consequence of the bombardment and more than 2,000 civilian buildings destroyed by Hezbollah rockets.

Israel has since killed a number of senior Hezbollah officials south of the Litani river, including Taleb Abdullah on 11 June 2024, a senior Hezbollah commander operating in South Lebanon between the Litani River and the border with Israel.

=== Alleged Israeli violations ===
The Lebanese government claims that Israel has violated the resolution over 7,000 times "by crossing Lebanese airspace," waters, and border on an almost daily basis since the implementation of the resolution with fighter jets and daily unmanned aerial vehicles flights across the southern Lebanese region.

During the south Lebanon bombings in August 2021, Lebanese state politicians stated concern over violations of Resolution 1701. Prime minister former at the time, Saad Hariri, posted on twitter, "... The situation on the border with the Israeli enemy is very, very dangerous and an unprecedented threat to Resolution 1701".

=== Alleged Lebanese violations ===
In 2009, Israel filed a complaint with the U.N. that Lebanon was not complying with the resolution after a Katyusha rocket was fired from Lebanon and landed next to a house in northern Israel and injured three people. The complaint affirmed Israel's right to defend itself and its citizens. Later in 2009, when weapons that Hezbollah was hiding in a civilian home in a Lebanese town near the border of Israel exploded, both Israel and UNIFIL complained that Resolution 1701 was being violated by Lebanon and Hezbollah. The IDF estimates that the number of civilian homes in southern Lebanon that are being used to store weapons are in the hundreds. Israel also criticized the Lebanese army, which is responsible for enforcing the resolution, for cooperating with Hezbollah in making sure that the evidence of the violation of the resolution had been cleared up before allowing U.N. peace keepers to do their job. Two days later, fifteen Lebanese civilians from Kfar Shuba, carrying Lebanese and Hizbullah flags, crossed into the Israeli occupied Shebaa Farms. The IDF took no action to the provocation, but stressed that it was a violation of Resolution 1701. The United Nations confirmed that Hezbollah violated the resolution and that the group is rearming.

== Later developments ==
After the October 7 attacks in 2023, Hezbollah, Hamas, and other militant groups in southern Lebanon routinely fired rockets at Israeli cities and fired on IDF positions on the Israel-Lebanon border. On 21 November 2023, Israeli Foreign Minister Eli Cohen warned the UNSC that a regional war was likely if UNSCR 1701 was not fully implemented. On 8 January 2024, Lebanese Foreign Minister Abdallah Bou Habib called for a diplomatic solution to the Israel-Hezbollah conflict through "full implementation" of the resolution.

=== 2025 ===
Following the decline of the Axis of Resistance renewed, new efforts have been made to implement UN Security Council Resolution 1701, originally adopted in 2006 to end hostilities between Israel and Hezbollah. In April 2025 it was reported that Hezbollah has withdrawn the majority of its military infrastructure from southern Lebanon, transferring control over 190 military positions out of its 265, to the Lebanese army. This move aligns with the November 2024 U.S.-brokered ceasefire agreement, which mandates Hezbollah's repositioning north of the Litani River and the deployment of approximately 5,000 Lebanese troops to the south. The withdrawal aims to reduce tensions along the Israel-Lebanon border and facilitate the return of displaced civilians. While Hezbollah has removed heavy weaponry, some fighters from southern villages remain with light arms. The situation remains delicate, with ongoing monitoring by international observers to ensure compliance with the ceasefire terms.

== See also ==
- History of the Arab–Israeli conflict
- Hezbollah
- List of United Nations Security Council Resolutions 1701 to 1800 (2006–2008)
- Ceasefire attempts during the 2006 Lebanon War
- United Nations Security Council Resolution 1559
- Homeland Shield Plan
- 1982 Lebanon War
