= Fouad Siniora =

Prime Minister of Lebanon from 2005 to 2009

- فؤاد السنيورة
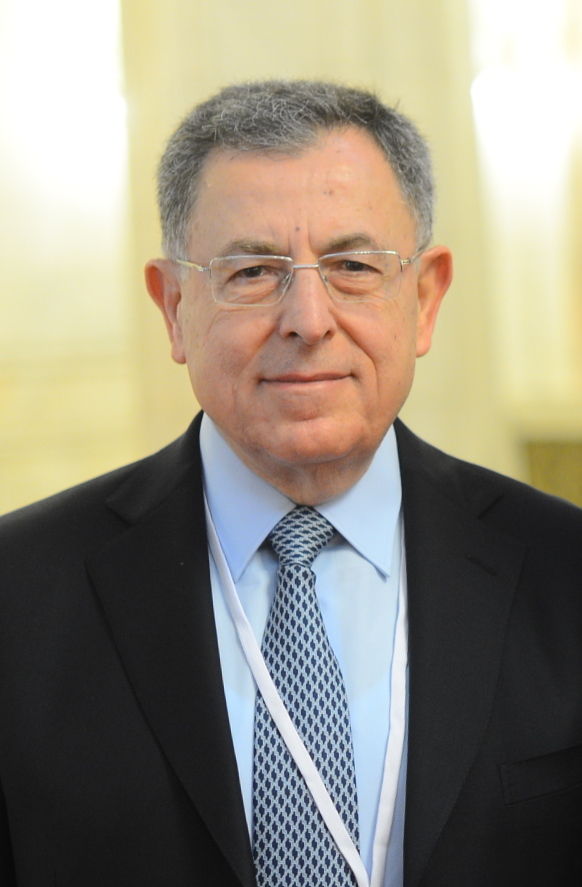
- Siniora in 2006

46th Prime Minister of Lebanon
- In office 19 July 2005 – 9 November 2009
- President: Émile Lahoud; Michel Suleiman
- Deputy: Elias al-Murr; Issam Abu Jamra
- Preceded by: Najib Mikati
- Succeeded by: Saad Hariri

Member of the Lebanese Parliament
- In office 20 June 2009 – 15 May 2018
- Constituency: Sidon District

Minister of Finance
- In office 26 October 2000 – 26 October 2004
- Prime Minister: Rafic Hariri
- Preceded by: Georges Corm
- Succeeded by: Elias Saba

Minister of State for Financial Affairs
- In office 31 October 1992 – 4 December 1998
- Prime Minister: Rafic Hariri

Personal details
- Born: 19 July 1943 (age 83) Sidon, Greater Lebanon
- Party: Future Movement
- Other political affiliations: March 14 Alliance (2005–2016)
- Spouse: Huda Siniora
- Children: 3
- Education: American University of Beirut; Lebanese University

Fouad Siniora (Note: alternative spellings: Fouad Sanyoura, Fuad Sinyora, Fouad Sanioura, Fouad Seniora, Fuad Siniora) (Arabic: فؤاد السنيورة, romanized: Fuʾād as-Sanyūrah; born 19 July 1943) is a Lebanese politician. He served as the 46th prime minister of Lebanon from 2005 to 2009. He served as minister of Finance from 2000 to 2004.

== Early career ==
In the 1970s, Sanioura worked for Citibank and taught at the American University of Beirut, his alma mater, and at the Lebanese University.

== Member of National Assembly ==
He served as Minister of State for Financial Affairs from 1992 to 1998, and as Minister of Finance from 2000 to 2004.

== Prime minister ==
After the victory of the anti-Syrian opposition in parliamentary elections held in May and June 2005, Fouad Siniora was asked by President Émile Lahoud on 30 June 2005 to form a government. He resigned from the chairmanship of Group Méditerranée (a banking holding controlled by the Hariri family). After laborious negotiations with the President and the different political forces, Siniora formed a government on 19 July 2005.

== 2006 Lebanon War ==
On 12 July 2006, Hezbollah launched a deadly cross-border attack against Israel, who subsequently started a 33-day heavy bombardment and land invasion of Lebanon, also known as the 2006 Lebanon War. On 27 July 2006, Siniora, seeking to end the conflict, presented a seven-point Siniora Plan at a 15-nation conference in Rome. Siniora also called for an Arab League meeting in Beirut. During a televised address at the conference, he famously "sobbed" as he described the effects of the war on the Lebanese people.

== Events leading to the Doha Agreement ==
On 13 November 2006, Shiite ministers backed by Hezbollah and Amal resigned from Siniora's cabinet. This took place on the eve of the day when the Special Tribunal for Lebanon trying the murderers of Rafik Hariri was to be discussed in a cabinet meeting. Although there were only six resigning ministers, nearly 40% of the Lebanese MPs are in the opposition.

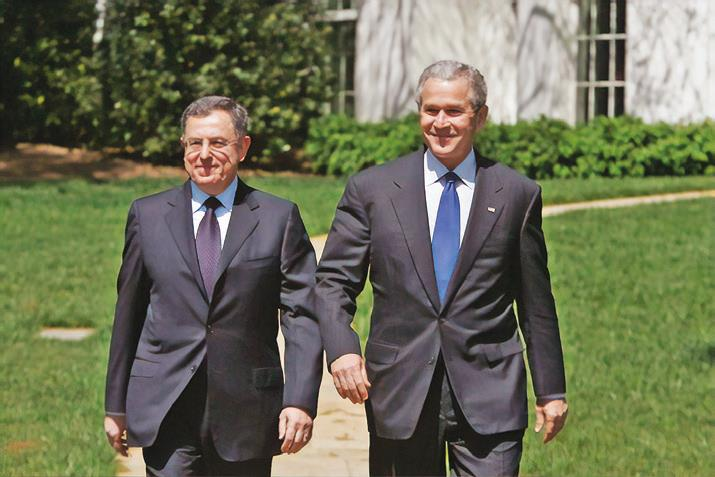
President George W. Bush and Prime Minister Siniora at the White House South Lawn on Tuesday, April 18, 2006

The Lebanese opposition claimed that this resignation meant that the Siniora Government was not a legitimate one because it did not represent all religious groups in Lebanon, namely the Shiite Lebanese. According to the constitution, the government is legal as long as it has two-thirds of the ministers, and so the majority believed the Siniora government was still a totally legal cabinet.

On 1 December 2006, the parliamentary minority, primarily the pro-Syrian parties of Amal, Hezbollah and the Free Patriotic Movement of Michael Aoun launched a campaign of street demonstrations with the goal of getting veto power in the government. The country was further put into paralysis when the opposition refused to attend the parliament and vote for a new president, after Emile Lahoud's presidential term expired. This meant the Fuad Siniora was an acting president until the new president was voted in.

On 7 May 2008, Hezbollah, Amal and the Syrian Social Nationalist Party, among others, launched an armed strike against Beirut. The Beirut–Rafic Hariri International Airport, the Government's Grand Serail, and houses of majority leaders, Saad Hariri and Walid Jumblatt, were all put under siege. Mount Lebanon was also attacked in the operation. Revenge attacks broke out in other areas of Lebanon.

== Post-premiership ==
Siniora has continued to criticise Hezbollah's influence in Lebanon, saying that "Practically, Lebanon as a state has been kidnapped by Hezbollah. And behind Hezbollah is Iran". In 2024, he opposed Lebanon being dragged into the war in Gaza, saying that the country "cannot afford, in principle, to get involved".

== Personal life ==
Siniora is married and has three children. He is known for his interest in Arab literature and poetry.

== See also ==
- First Cabinet of Fouad Siniora
- Position of Lebanon in the 2006 Lebanon War
- Siniora Plan

== Notes ==
Political offices
Preceded by Najib Mikati	Prime Minister of Lebanon; 2005–2009	Succeeded by Saad Hariri
Preceded by Émile Lahoud	President of Lebanon; Acting; 2007–2008	Succeeded by Michel Suleiman
