= 2018 Lebanese general election in North II =

2018 Lebanese general election (North II)
- 6 May 2018

11 seats to the Parliament of Lebanon for North II constituency
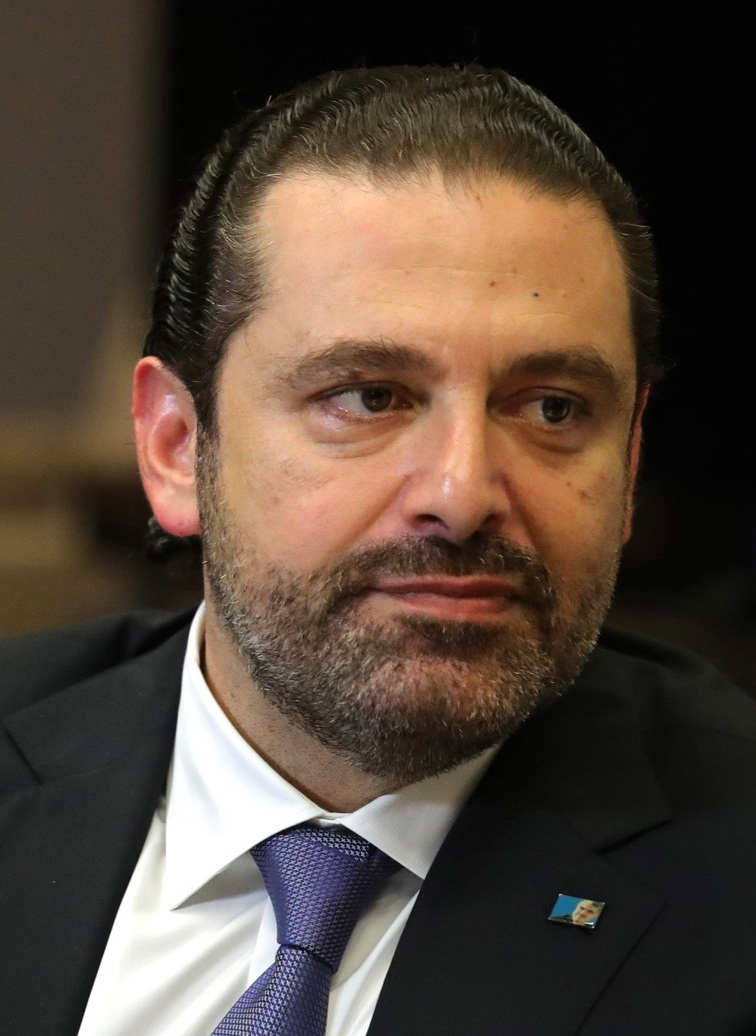

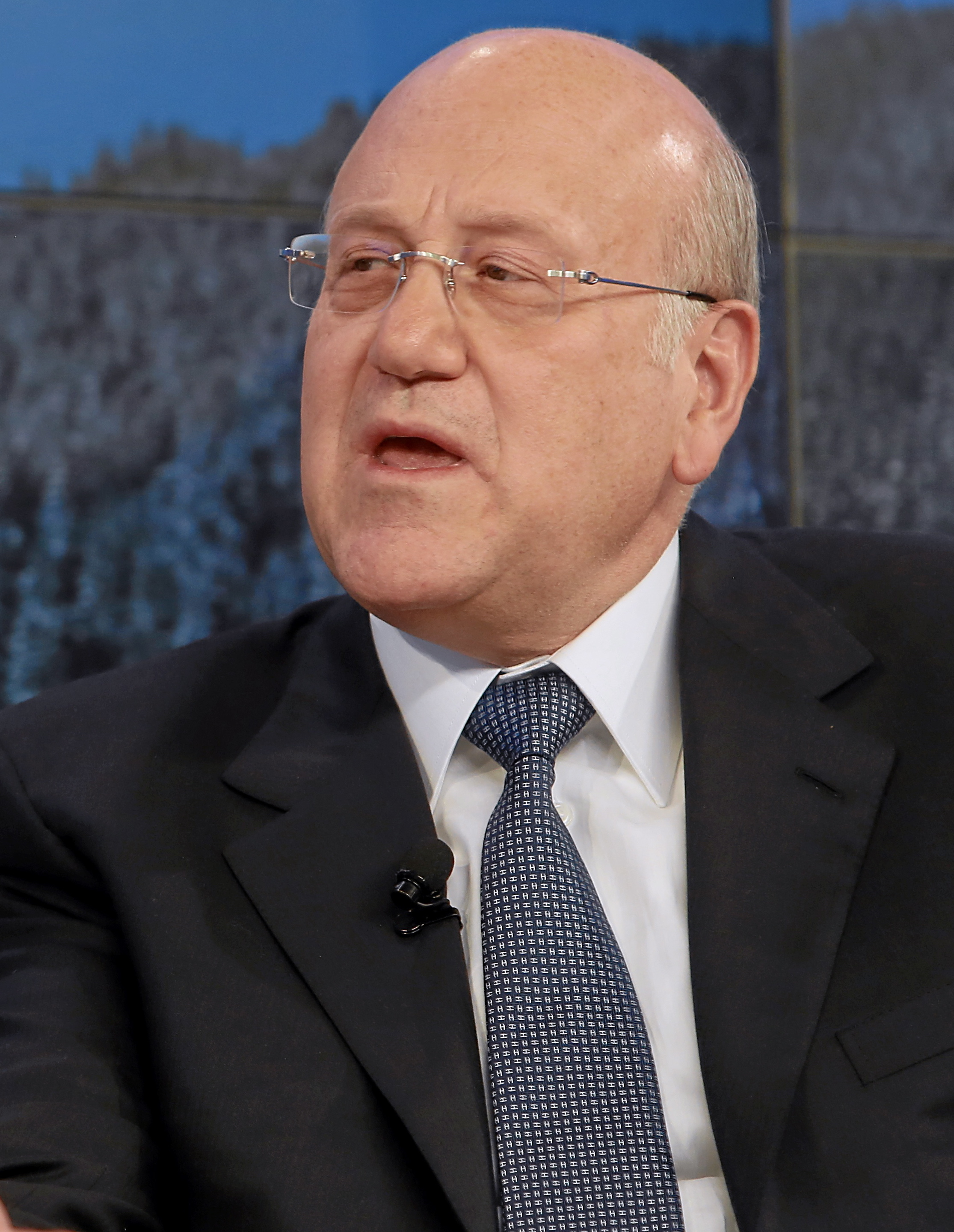

	First party	Second party	Third party
Leader	Saad Hariri	Najib Mikati	Faisal Karami
Party	Future Movement	Azm Movement	Dignity Movement
Leader's seat	Beirut II	Tripoli	Tripoli
Seats won	5	4	2
Popular vote	51,937	42,019	29,101
Percentage	35.47	28.70%	19.88%
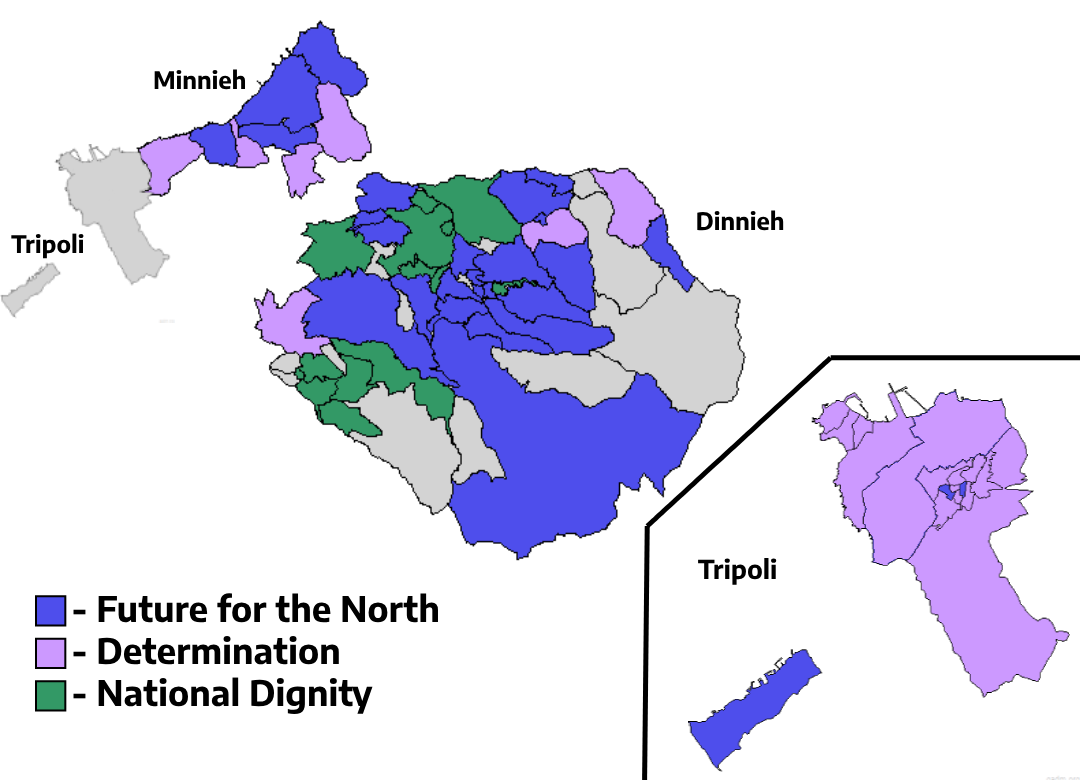
- Majority voting by municipality in the North II electoral district, covering the Tripoli and Miniyeh–Danniyeh District. The North II electoral district is divided into 3 minor districts: Tripoli, Miniyeh and Denniyeh.
Elected Prime Minister
Saad Hariri
Future Movement

Voting to elect eleven members of the Lebanese parliament took place in the North II district on 6 May 2018, part of the general election of that year. The constituency had 350,147 registered to vote, out of whom 146,419 voted. Residents elect 8 Sunni, 1 Alawite, 1 Greek Orthodox and 1 Maronite seat. The constituency contains three 'minor districts', Tripoli (corresponding to Tripoli District), Miniyeh and Danniyeh (the latter two corresponding to the Miniyeh-Danniyeh District).

== Demographics ==
The electorate is predominately Sunni (82.91%), with significant minorities of Greek Orthodox (6.24%), Alawites (6.04%) and Maronites (3.5%). 0.51% of the electorate are Armenian Orthodox, 0.32% Armenian Catholics and 0.59% belong to other Christian communities.

== Elections ==
With the new election law in place, the heavyweights of Tripoli politics went in different directions. Justifying the decision to head to the polls alone, the Future Movement general secretary Ahmed Hariri stated that "[w]e will form our own list because we came to understand that a lot of people had taken advantage of us...". In Dennieh, the 28-year old Sami Fatfat overtook his father Ahmad Fatfat's mantle as the Future Movement candidate. Mohammad Safadi opted to stay out of the electoral race, calling for support to the Future list. Safadi announced his decision at a press conference at the Safadi Cultural Center.

All in all, 8 lists were registered in the second northern electoral district; the "Determination" list of former Prime Minister Najib Mikati, the Future Movement list, a list led by Ashraf Rifi, the "National Dignity" list (alliance between Faisal Karami and Jihad Samad, with participation of Al-Ahbash and Marada Movement), the "People's Decision" list (alliance between Free Patriotic Movement and Kamal Kheir, joined by independents), the "Kulluna Watani" (We are all National) list (Sabaa Party, Movement of Citizens in the State, Socialist Arab Lebanon Vanguard Party, Resistance Movement and independents), the "Independent Decision" list (alliance between al-Jamaa al-Islamiah, ex-parliamentarian Mesbah Ahdab and independents) and the "Independent Civil Society" list (independents).

Mikati launched his "Determination" list at an electoral meeting at the Quality Inn Hotel in Tripoli on March 18, 2018. Amongst his candidates were former minister Jean Obeid and Nicolas Nahas and incumbent Future parliamentarian Kazim Kheir. Kheir was denied the Minnieh spot on the Future Movement list, a move that pushed him to join the Mikati list instead.

=== Result by lists ===
List	Sunni (Tripoli, 5 seats)					Maronite (Tripoli, 1 seat)	Greek Orthodox (Tripoli, 1 seat)	Alawite (Tripoli, 1 seat)	Sunni (Dennieh, 2 seats)		Sunni (Minnieh, 1 seat)
"Future for the North"	Mohammad Kabbara; 9600 (6.56%) (Future)	Samir Jisr; 9,527 (6.51%) (Future)	Dima Jamali; 2066 (1.41%) (Future)	Chadi Nachabe (Future)	Walid Sawalhi (Future)	George Bkassini (Future)	Nima Mahfoud (Future)	Leila Chahoud (Future)	Sami Fafat; 7,943 (5.42%) (Future)	Qassem Abdel Aziz (Future)	Osman Alameddine; 10,221(6.98%) (Future)
"Determination"	Najib Mikati; 21,300 (14.55%) (Azm Movement)	Rashid Mokhtam (Azm Movement)	Mohamed Nadim Jisr (Azm Movement)	Tawfiq Sultan (Azm Movement)	Mirfat Hawz (Azm Movement)	Jean Obeid; 1,136 (0.78%) (Azm Movement)	Nicolas Nahas; 1,057 (0.72%)(Azm Movement)	Alawi Darwish; 2,246 (1.53%) (Azm Movement)	Mohammed Fadhil (Azm Movement)	Jihad Yusuf (Azm Movement)	Kazim Kheir (Azm Movement)
"National Dignity"	Faisal Karami; 7,126 (4.87%) (Dignity Movement)	Taha Naji (Al-Ahbash)	Mohammed Safouh Yakan (National Gathering)	Abdel Nasser Masri (Lebanese People's Congress)	Ayman Nouruddin Omar		Rafli Anton Diab (Marada)	Ahmed Mahmoud Omran	Jihad al-Samad; 11,897(8.13%)		Adel Zreika (Dignity Movement)
"Sovereign Lebanon"	Ashraf Rifi	Khaled Tadmori	Mohammed Walid Qamaruddin	Mohamed Salhab	Ali Ayoubi	Halim Zani	George Jalad	Badr Eid	Ragheb Raad	Oussama Amoun	Waleed Masri
"Independent Decision"	Mesbah Ahdab	Waseem Alwan (al-Jama'a al-Islamiah)	Nariman Jamal			Tony Khalifa	Menzeh Sawan	Hisham Ibrahim (Al Moaie)	Ali Farouk Samad	Abdul Salam Trad	Mohamed Ahmed
"People's Decision"	Khalid Roumieh					Tony Maroni (FPM)	Nastas Koshary	Mahmoud Shehadeh	Ahmed Shandab	Ali Hermoush	Kamal Kheir
"Independent Civil Society"	Heba Naja	Jamal Badawi					Fadi Jamal	Hassan Hassan Khalil	Samah Arja	Ayman Jamal	Abdullah Rifai
"Kulluna Watani" (We are all National)	Nariman Chamaa (MMFD)	Yehia Mawloud	Mohammad Monzer Maaliki (Lebanon Vanguard)	Wathek Moukaddam	Malek Moulawi (Sabaa)	Moussa Khoury (MMFD)	Farah Issa (Sabaa)	Zeinelddine Dib	Ahmad Douhaiby		Dany Othman (Sabaa)
Source: Al-Modon Ministry of Interior and Municipalities
