= 2022 Lebanese general election =

2022 election in which all 128 members of the Lebanese Parliament were chosen

- 15 May 2022

All 128 seats to the Parliament of Lebanon 65 seats needed for a majority
- Turnout: 49.19% (▼0.51pp)
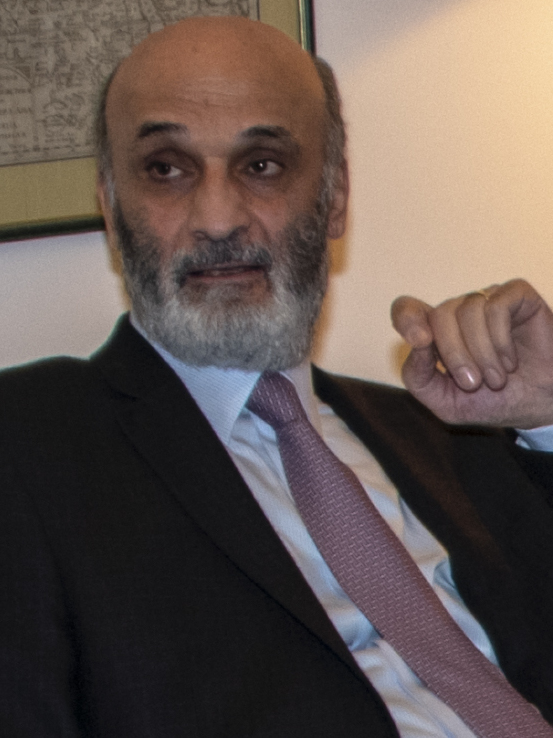

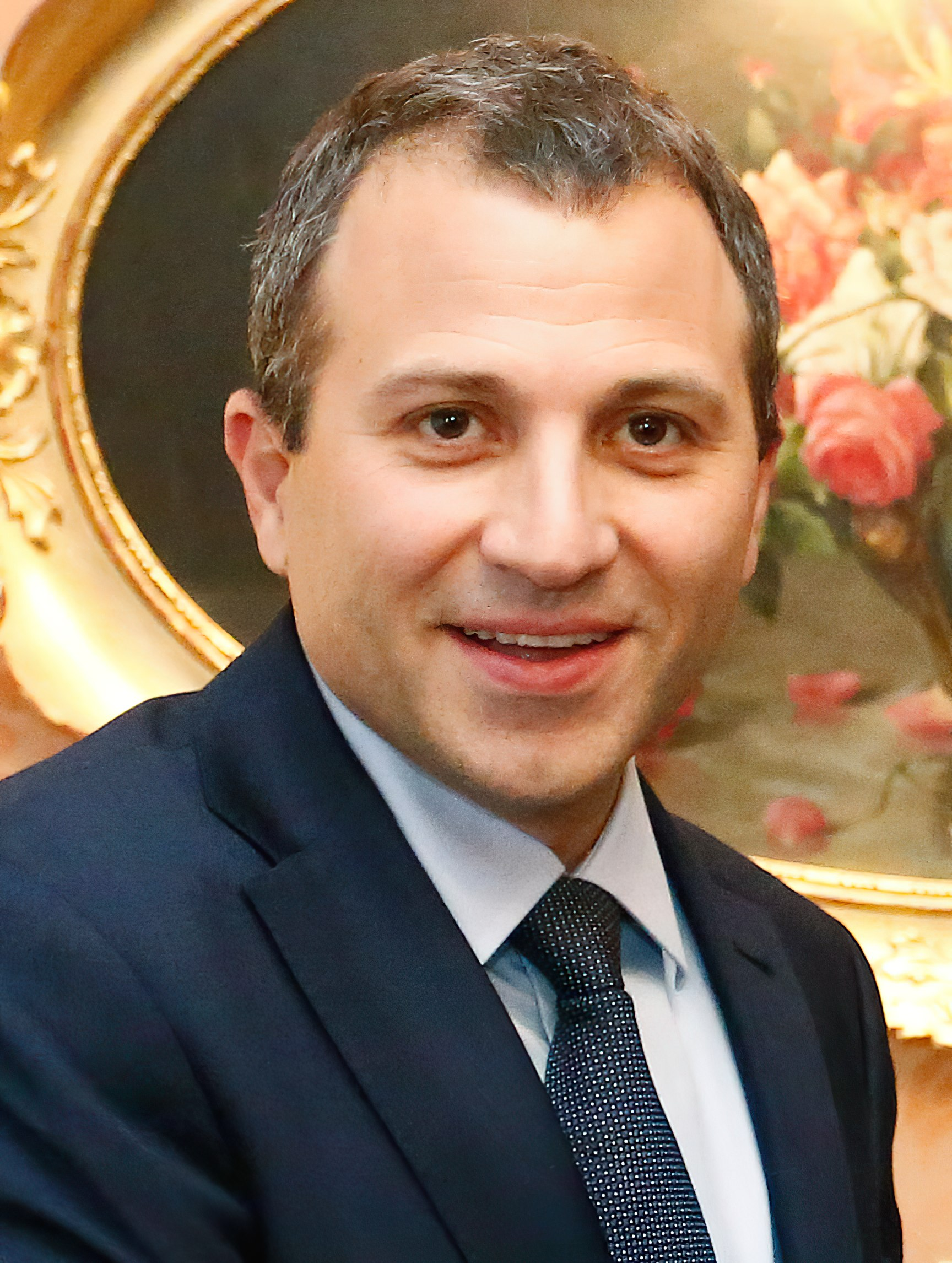

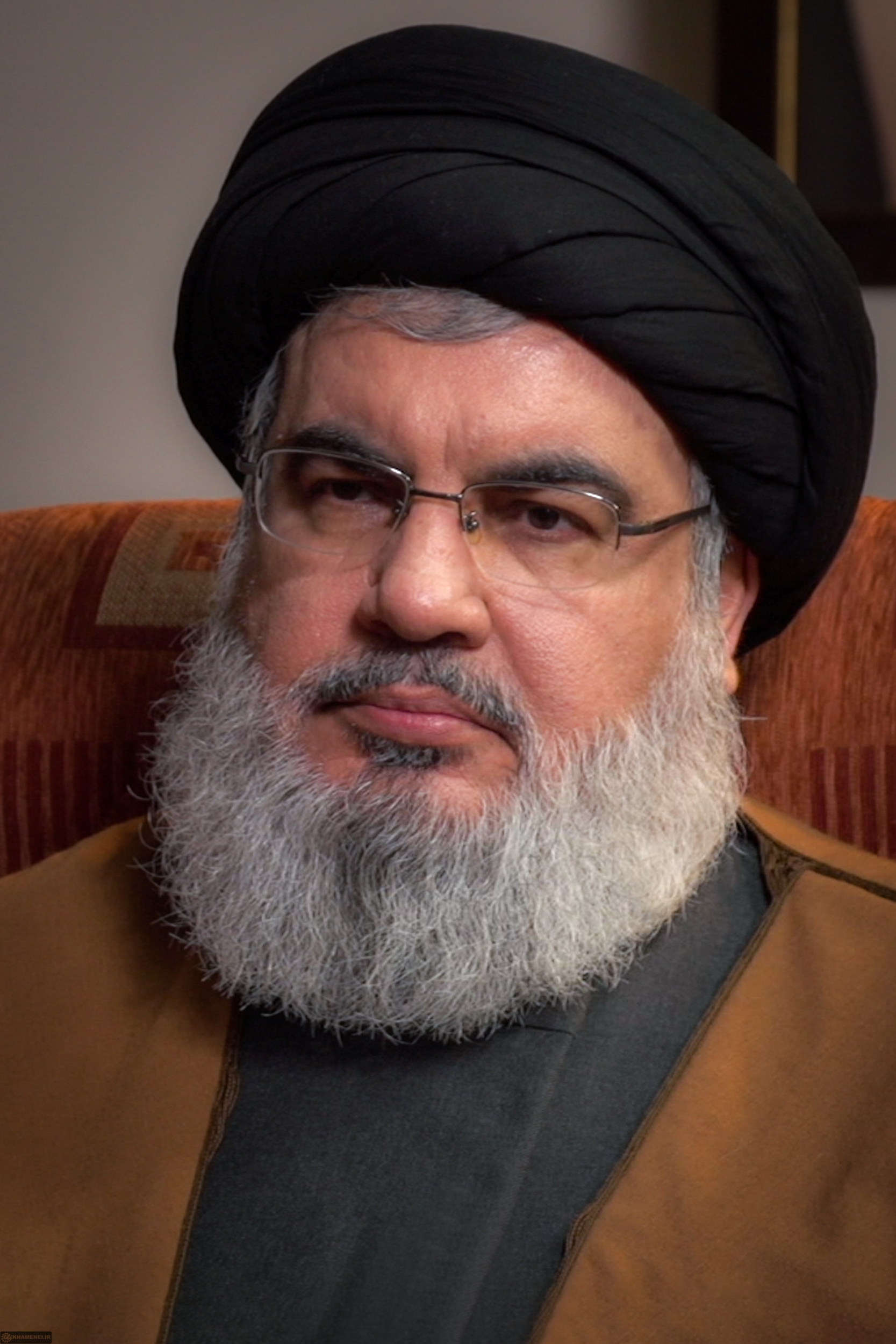

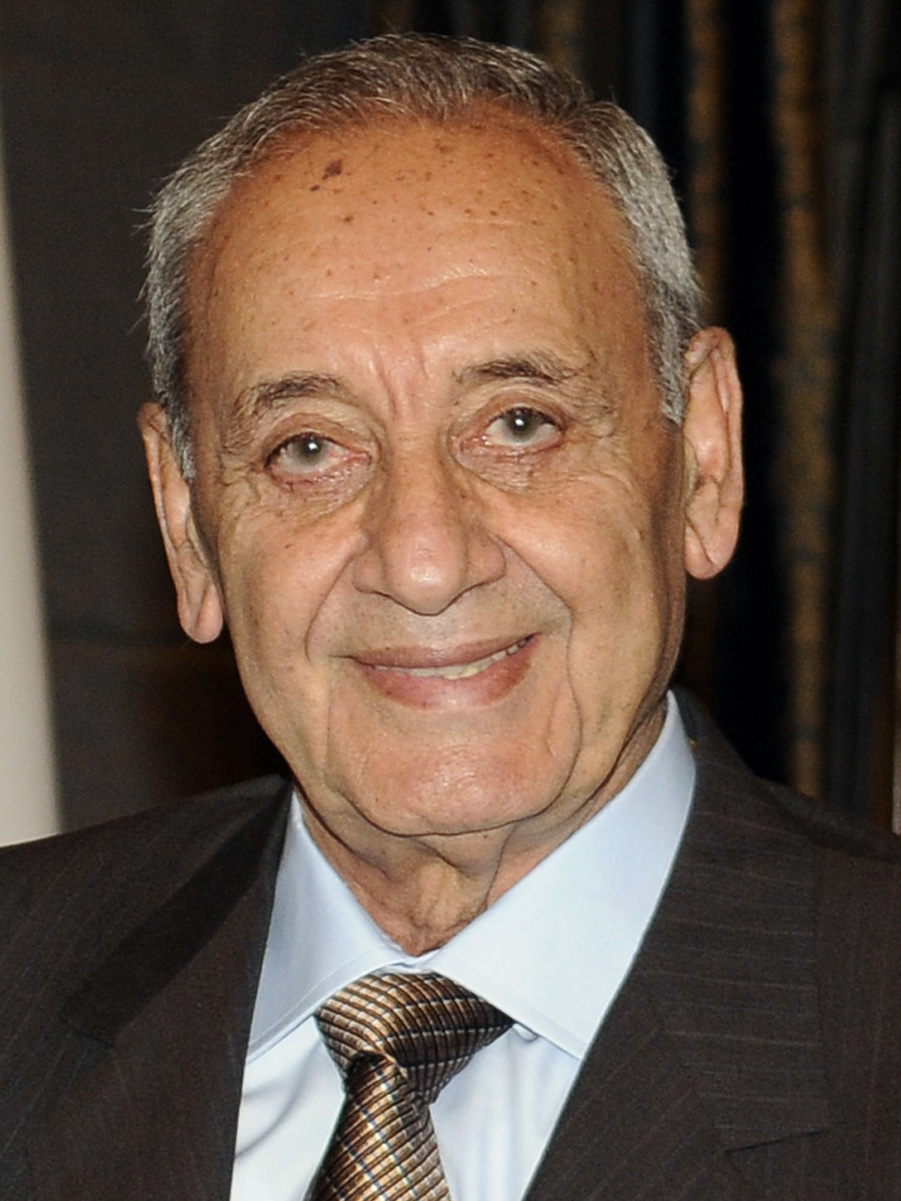

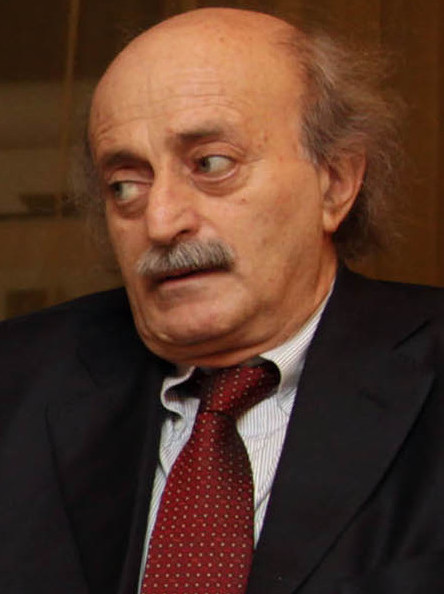

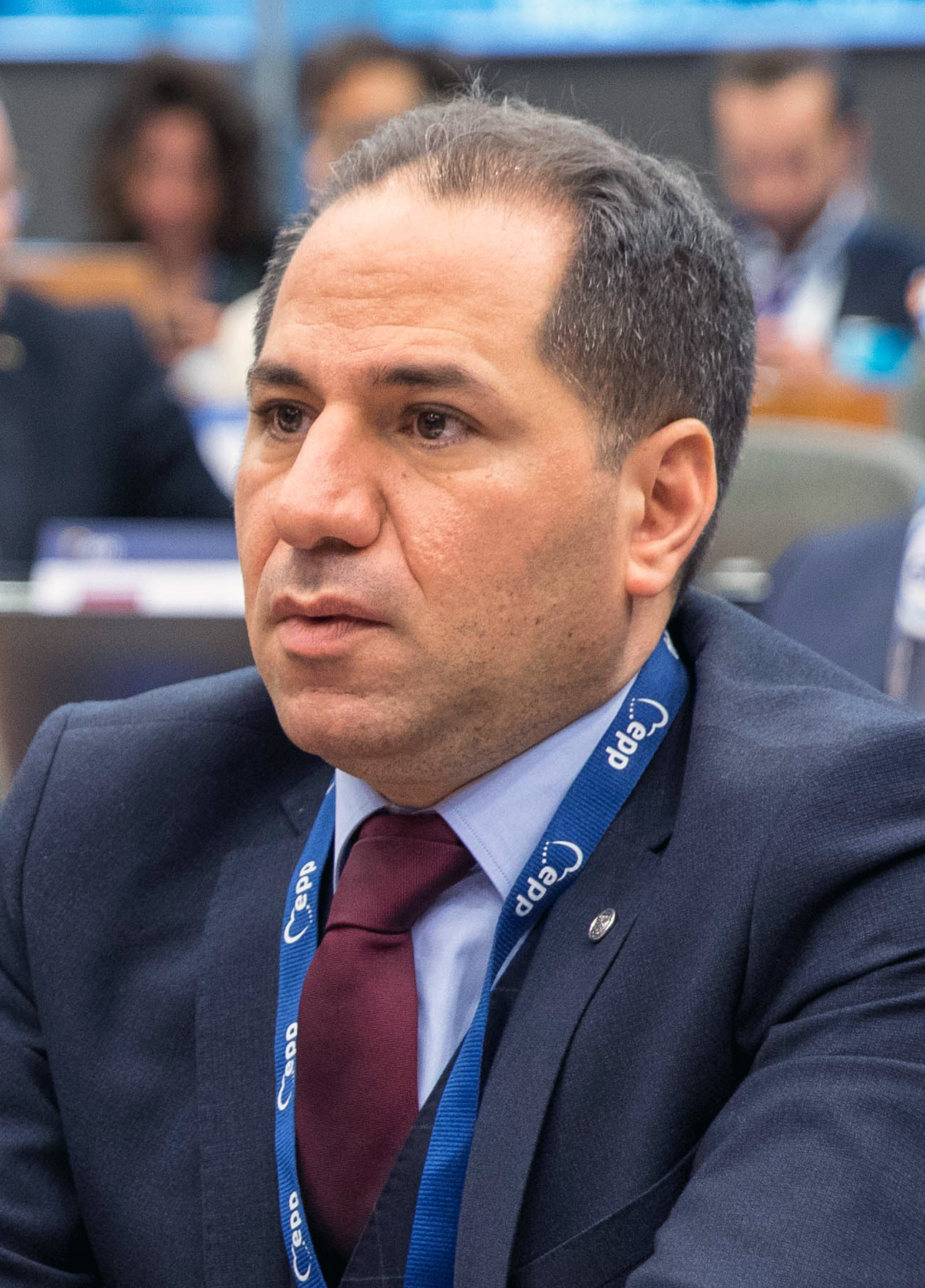

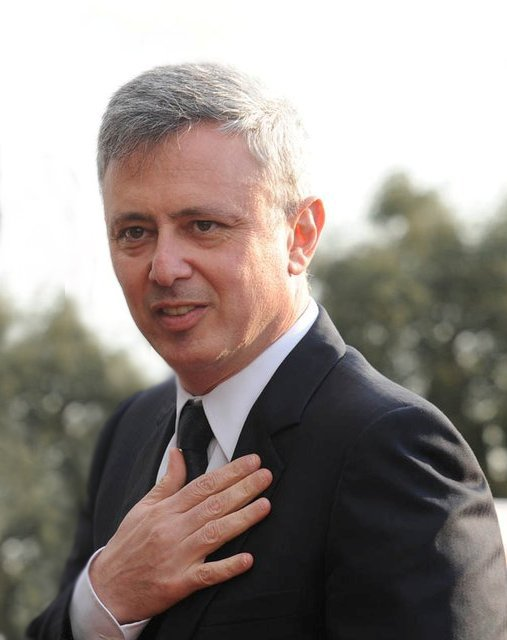

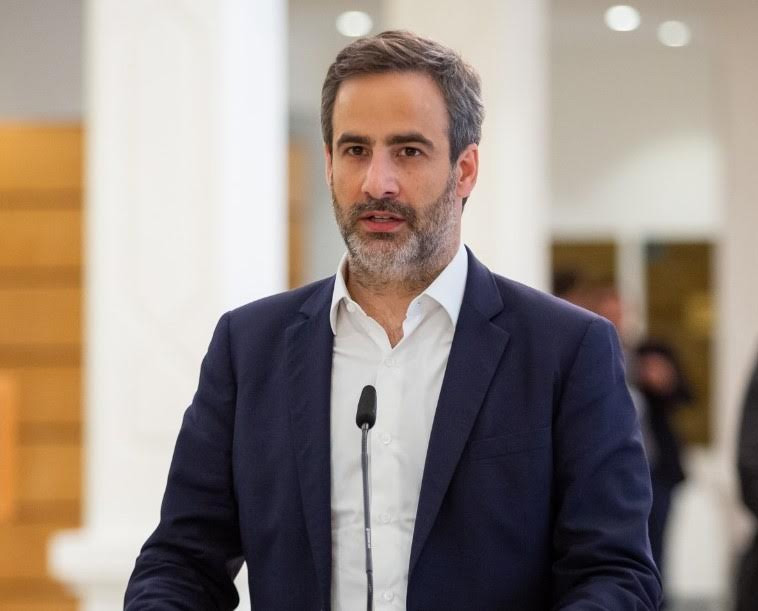
	First party	Second party	Third party
Leader	Samir Geagea	Gebran Bassil	Hassan Nasrallah
Party	Lebanese Forces	FPM	Hezbollah
Leader's seat	Did not stand	Batroun	Did not stand
Last election	15	29	12
Seats won	19	17	15
Seat change	▲4	▼12	▲3
Popular vote	210,324	144,646	359,577
Percentage	11.63%	8.00%	19.89%
Swing	▲2.02pp	▼7.49pp	▲3.45pp
	Fourth party	Fifth party	Sixth party
Leader	Nabih Berri	Walid Jumblatt	Samy Gemayel
Party	Amal Movement	PSP	Kataeb
Leader's seat	Zahrani	Did not stand	Metn
Last election	17	9	3
Seats won	15	8	4
Seat change	▼2	▼1	▲1
Popular vote	190,161	75,485	33,604
Percentage	10.52%	4.18%	1.86%
Swing	▼1.43pp	▼0.42pp	▲0.04pp
	Seventh party	Eighth party	Ninth party
Leader	Hagop Pakradounian	Suleiman Frangieh	Michel Moawad
Party	Tashnag	Marada Movement	Independence Movement
Leader's seat	Metn	Did not stand	Zgharta
Last election	3	3	1
Seats won	3	2	2
Seat change	Steady	▼1	▲1
Popular vote	12,499	25,254	14,659
Percentage	0.69%	1.40%	0.81%
Swing	▼0.09pp	▼0.42pp	▲0.32pp
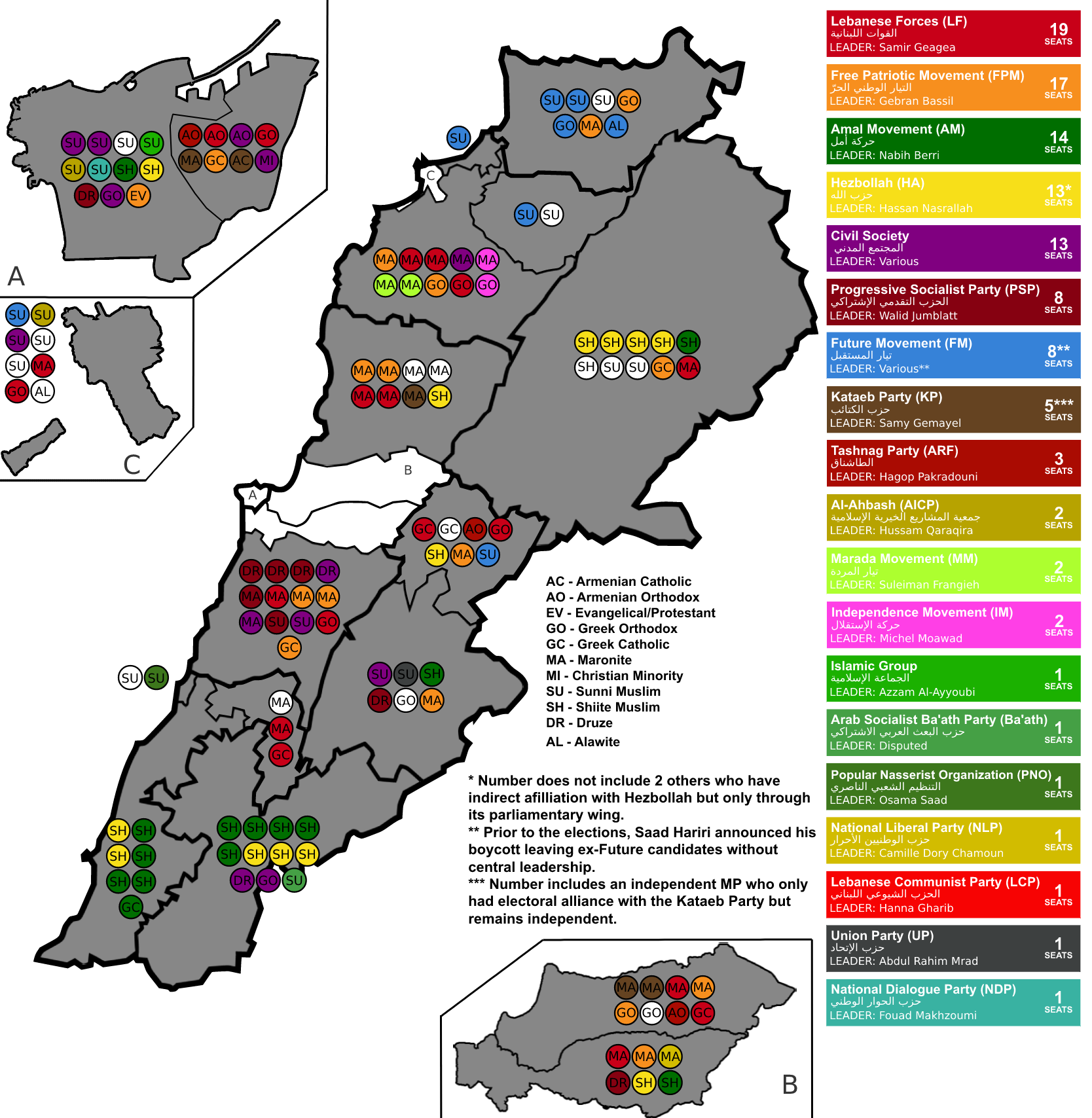
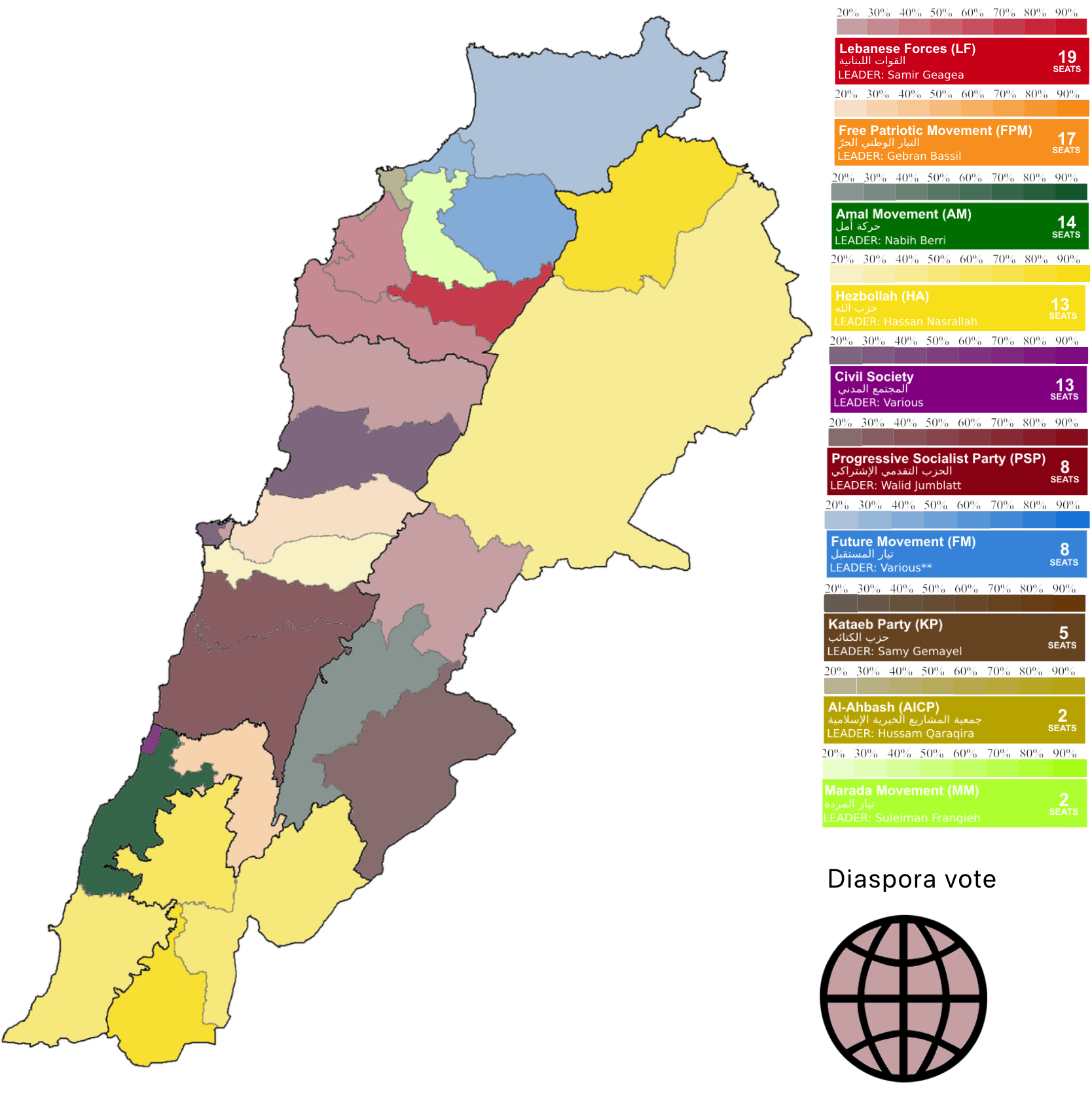
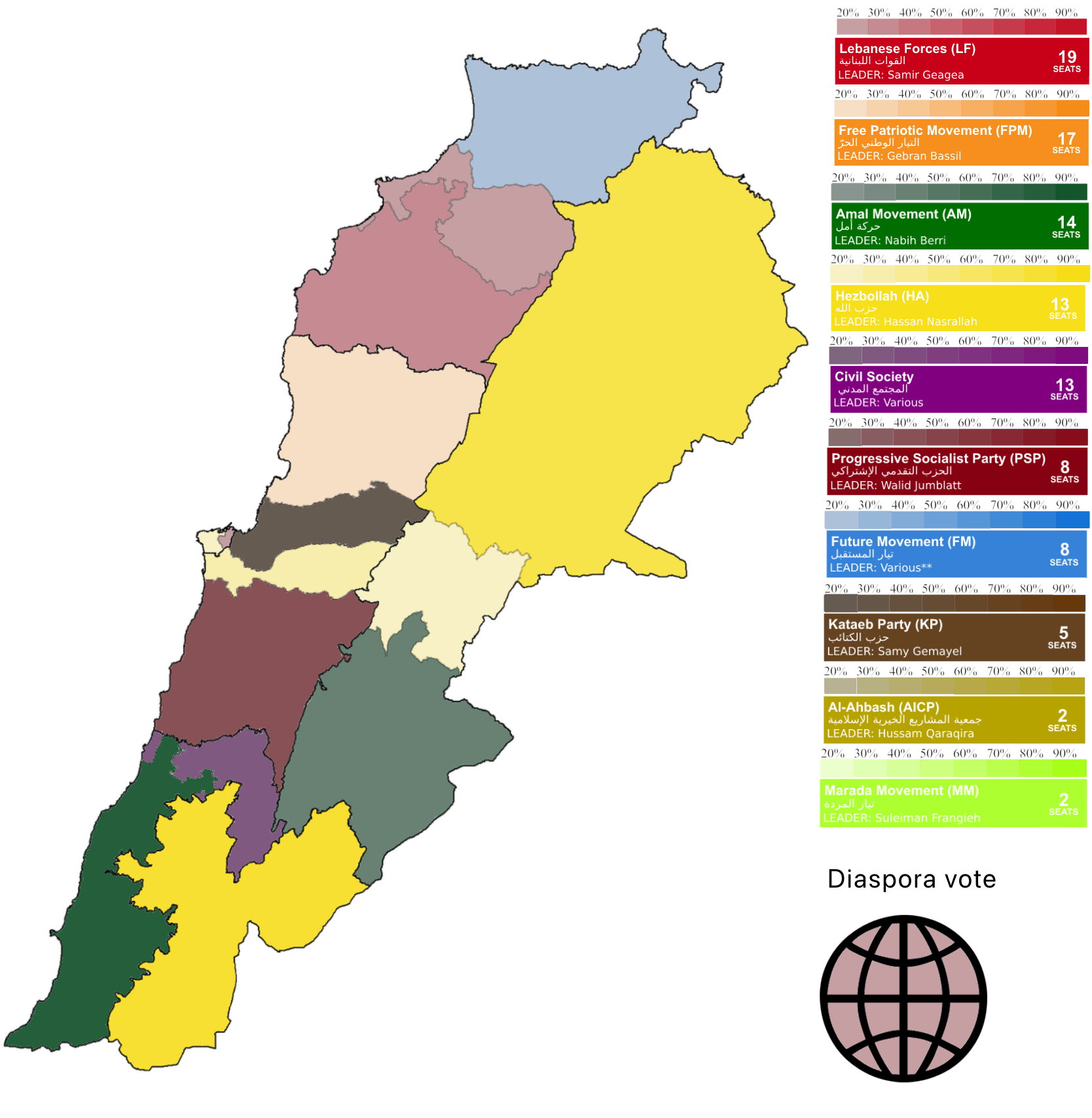
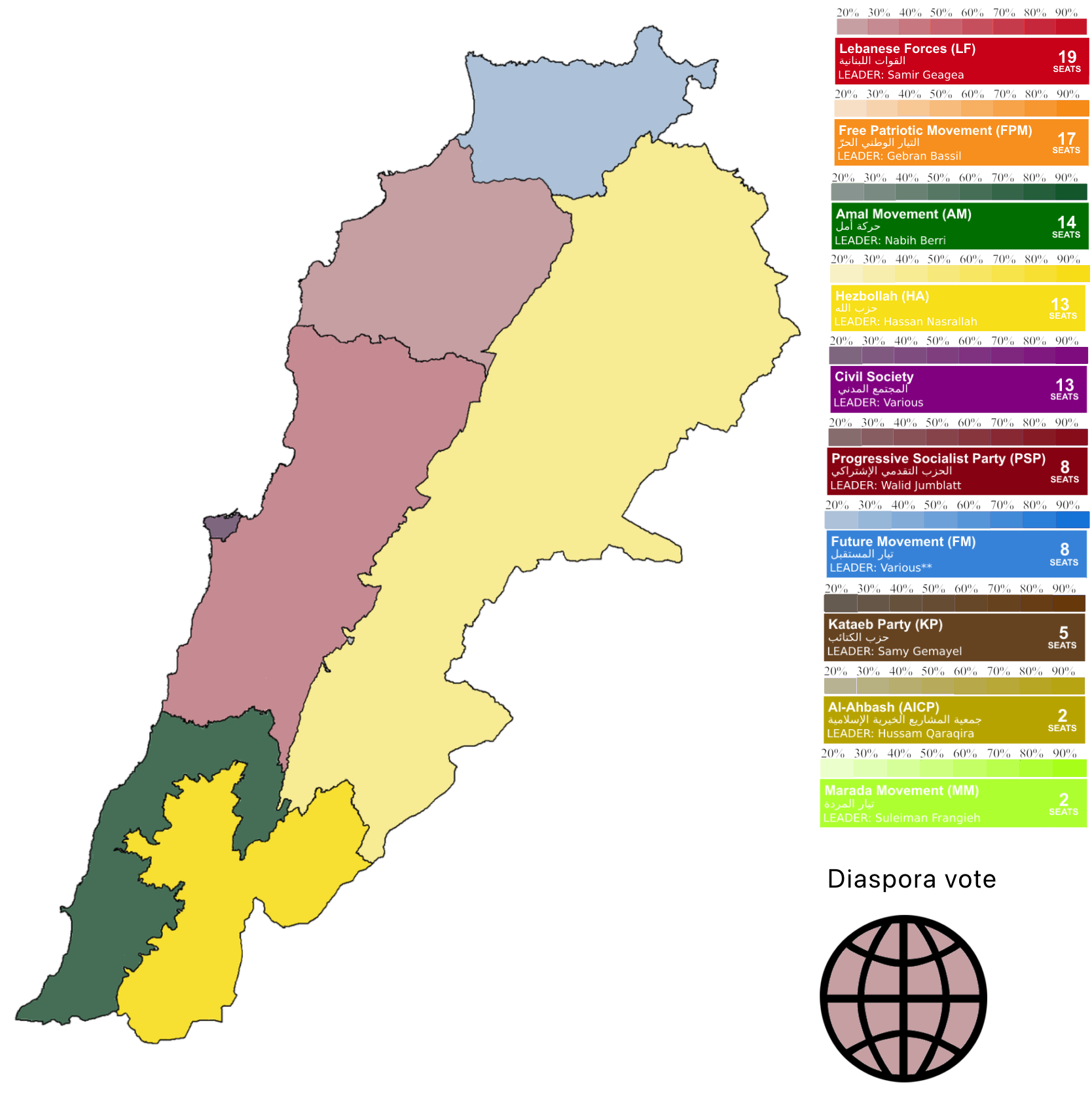
Prime Minister before election
Najib Mikati
Azm Movement
Elected Prime Minister
Nawaf Salam
Independent

General elections were held in Lebanon on 15 May 2022 (one week earlier for overseas voters and one day earlier for ballot workers) to elect all 128 members of the Lebanese Parliament. The country has for several years been the subject of chronic political instability as well as a serious economic crisis aggravated by the 2020 explosions that hit the Port of Beirut and faced large-scale demonstrations against the political class.

Hezbollah and their allies lost their parliamentary majority but still won the Parliament speaker election. The Lebanese Christian-based Lebanese Forces led by Samir Geagea made gains and won 19 seats as well as independent candidates promising reforms.

== Background ==
=== 2019–21 protests ===
Large-scale antigovernmental demonstrations ignited in the country from 17 October. Initially triggered in response to a rise in gas and tobacco prices as well as a new tax on messaging applications, the demonstrations quickly turned into a revolution against the stagnation of the economy, unemployment, Lebanon's sectarian and hereditary political system, corruption and the government's inability to provide essential services such as water, electricity and sanitation, involving hundreds of thousands of people from every region and sect of the country. Saad Hariri ended up resigning on 29 October 2019.

Hassan Diab was appointed prime minister by President Michel Aoun on 19 December 2019. His government obtained the confidence of parliament by 69 votes in its favour.

The country's economic situation continued to deteriorate and the government was indebted over 95 billion dollars by the end of 2020. The Lebanese pound lost 70% of its value in six months and 35% of the active population was unemployed. Riots broke out in Beirut, Tripoli and Jounieh.

=== Impact of the COVID-19 pandemic ===
During the first year of the COVID-19 pandemic, Lebanon could have been considered a success story. Despite the devastating economic impact of lockdowns, including a significant Lebanese lira devaluation in spring 2020, Lebanon was largely unscathed by COVID-19 until early 2021, when the healthcare system collapsed under a deluge of cases. This only further accelerated the already devastating economic crisis.

=== Beirut explosion ===
On 4 August 2020, the explosion of several thousand tons of ammonium nitrate stored in a hangar in the Port of Beirut caused considerable human and material damage across the city and the port. The final toll was over 235 dead and over 7,000 injured and damage estimated at over $10 billion and estimated to have left 300,000 homeless. The industrial-port zone of the Port of Beirut's badly affected, further aggravating the economic situation. Vital for Lebanon, the port is the most important trading centres in Lebanon which ensures the transit of 60% of the country's imports.

== Electorate ==
=== Electoral system ===
In accordance with the Lebanese practice of political confessionalism, the Lebanese religious communities distribute reserved seats in the different constituencies according to their demographic weight. The total votes in each constituency is divided by the number of seats to be filled, providing the electoral threshold necessary for a list to obtain a seat. Seats are first distributed between the lists having reached this threshold, then within the lists in accordance with the denominational quotas and the number of preferential votes obtained by the candidates.

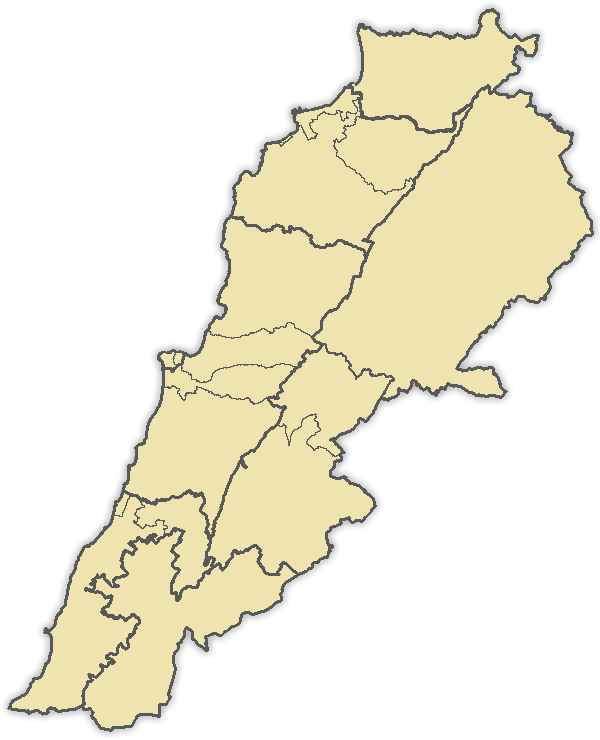
Map of the electoral districts

Electoral district under 2017 Election Law	Seats	Sunni	Shia	Druze	Alawite	Maronite	Greek Orthodox	Greek Catholic	Armenian Orthodox	Armenian Catholic	Evangelical	Minorities
Beirut I (East Beirut)	8					1	1	1	3	1		1
Beirut II (West Beirut)	11	6	2	1			1				1	
Bekaa I (Zahle)	7	1	1			1	1	2	1			
Bekaa II (West Bekaa-Rachaya)	6	2	1	1		1	1					
Bekaa III (Baalbek-Hermel)	10	2	6			1		1				
Mount Lebanon I (Byblos-Kesrwan)	8		1			7						
Mount Lebanon II (Metn)	8					4	2	1	1			
Mount Lebanon III (Baabda)	6		2	1		3						
Mount Lebanon IV (Aley-Chouf)	13	2		4		5	1	1				
North I (Akkar)	7	3			1	1	2					
North II (Tripoli-Minnieh-Dennieh)	11	8			1	1	1					
North III (Bcharre-Zghorta-Batroun-Koura)	10					7	3					
South I (Saida-Jezzine)	5	2				2		1				
South II (Zahrany-Tyre)	7		6					1				
South III (Marjaayoun-Nabatieh-Hasbaya-Bint Jbeil)	11	1	8	1			1					
Total	128	27	27	8	2	34	14	8	5	1	1	1
Source: 961News

=== Registered voters ===
Preliminary lists of the numbers of voters (15–12–2021):

District	Resident registers	Non-resident registers	Total
Akkar	300,668	8,415	309,083
Aley	123,753	9,955	133,708
Baabda	158,755	13,271	172,026
Baalbek-Hermel	333,439	7,854	341,293
Batroun	56,140	6,416	62,556
Beirut I	125,218	9,668	134,886
Beirut II	344,561	26,459	371,020
Bint Jbeil	155,354	6,909	162,263
Bsharre	44,826	6,048	50,874
Chouf	197,363	15,490	212,853
Dinnieh	71,657	3,026	74,683
Jbeil	80,221	5,752	85,973
Jezzine	57,175	4,898	62,073
Keserwan	89,378	7,173	96,551
Koura	56,869	6,026	62,895
Marjaayoun-Hasbaya	167,085	8,584	175,669
Metn	169,950	13,612	183,662
Minnieh	46,737	1,343	48,080
Nabatieh	153,271	6,418	159,689
Sidon (City)	63,809	3,435	67,244
Tripoli	243,903	10,868	254,771
Tyre	193,907	11,487	205,394
West Bekaa-Rachaya	146,776	7,152	153,928
Zahle	174,157	9,566	183,723
Zahrani	116,128	7,097	123,225
Zgharta	73,859	8,192	82,051
Total	3,744,959	225,114	3,970,073
Source: Ministry of Interior and Municipalities

== Lebanese living abroad ==
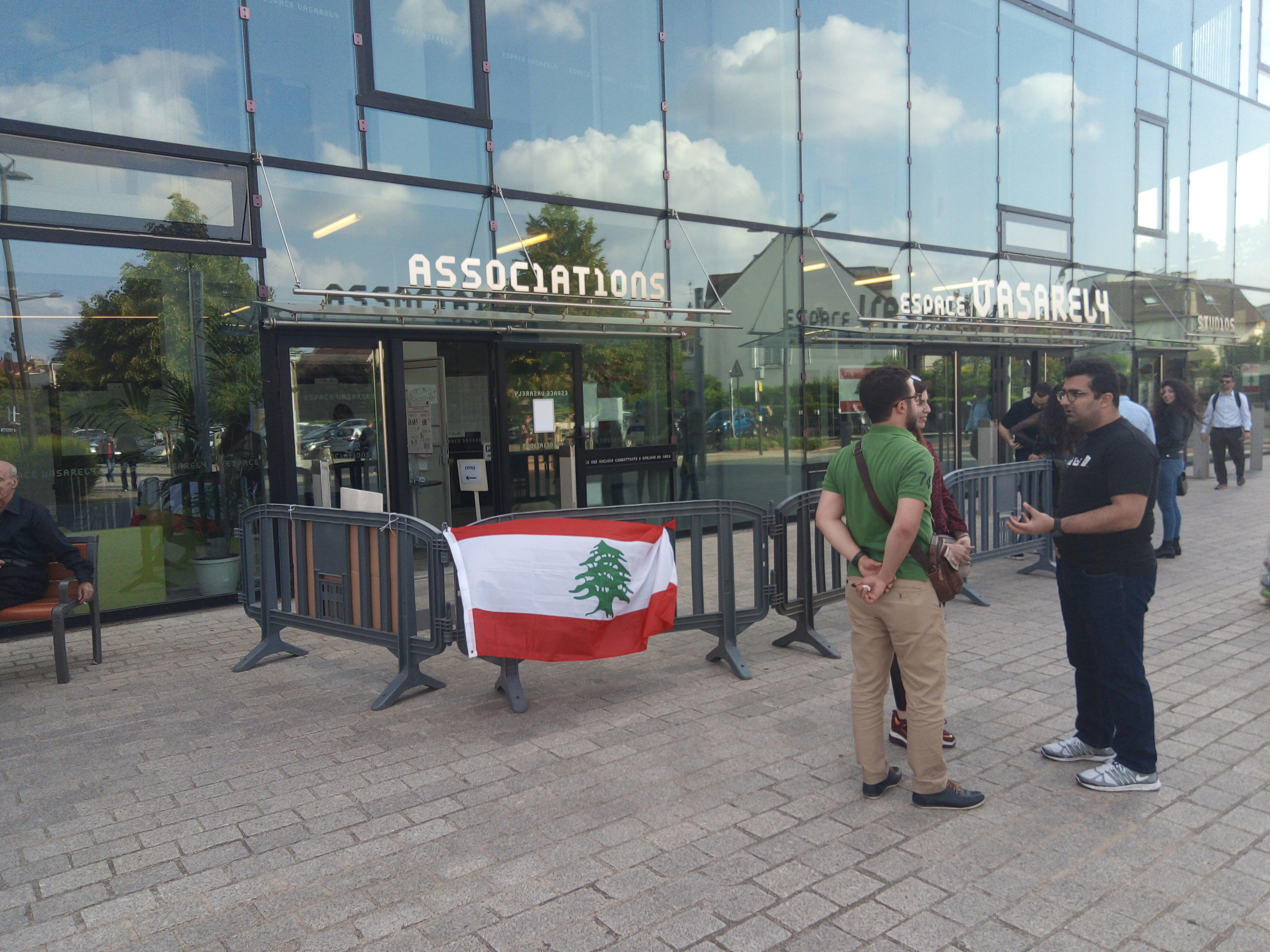
Polling station in Antony, France

Lebanese living abroad are allowed to participate in legislative elections. Although the Lebanese diaspora is estimated to be as high as 14 million individuals, most of them no longer possess nationality several decades after the waves of emigration that affected the country. Only 225,114 of diaspora had thus registered for the 2022 elections, which is still a significant increase from the 82,000 that registered last election. Although a section of the 2017 electoral law provides for the allocation of six seats apart for the diaspora, their vote is still counted in their constituencies. Lebanese living in the Arab world outside of Lebanon voted on 6 May, meanwhile Lebanese living in the UAE and the rest of the world voted on 8 May. Lebanese people living in 48 countries were reported to have cast their votes.

Voter turnout for Lebanese living abroad
Electoral District	District	Votes	Registered	Total votes	Total Registered	% Participation
Beirut 1	East Beirut	6,320	9,647	6,320	9,647	65.51%
Beirut 2	West Beirut	16,346	26,392	16,346	26,392	61.94%
Bekaa 1	Zahle	6,119	9,610	6,119	9,610	63.67%
Bekaa 2	Rachaya – West Bekaa	4,589	7,149	4,589	7,149	64.19%
Bekaa 3	Baalbek – Hermel	4,653	7,817	4,653	7,817	59.52%
Mount Lebanon 1	Keserouane	5,132	7,161	9,136	12,913	70.75%
Mount Lebanon 1	Byblos/Jbeil	4,004	5,752	9,136	12,913	70.75%
Mount Lebanon 2	Metn	9,812	13,581	9,812	13,581	72.95%
Mount Lebanon 3	Baabda	8,721	13,251	8,721	13,251	65.81%
Mount Lebanon 4	Aley	6,557	9,971	17,066	25,528	67.50%
Mount Lebanon 4	Chouf	10,509	15,557	17,066	25,528	67.50%
North 1	Akkar	4,781	8,446	4,781	8,446	56.61%
North 2	Minieh	697	1,345	8,917	15,260	58.43%
North 2	Tripoli	6,465	10,875	8,917	15,260	58.43%
North 2	Denieh	1,755	3,040	8,917	15,260	58.43%
North 3	Zgharta	5,198	8,203	17,447	26,692	65.36%
North 3	Bcharre	3,719	6,039	17,447	26,692	65.36%
North 3	Koura	4,057	6,026	17,447	26,692	65.36%
North 3	Batroun	4,473	6,424	17,447	26,692	65.36%
South 1	Saida	2,140	3,443	5,356	8,344	64.18%
South 1	Jezzine	3,216	4,901	5,356	8,344	64.18%
South 2	Tyre	6,930	11,543	10,778	18,675	53.95%
South 2	Zahrani	3,848	7,132	10,778	18,675	53.95%
South 3	Hasbaya – Marjayoun	4,556	8,592	12,000	21,972	54.61%
South 3	Bint Jbail	3,750	6,954	12,000	21,972	54.61%
South 3	Nabateye	3,694	6,426	12,000	21,972	54.61%
Total	Lebanon	142,041	225,277	142,041	225,277	63.00%

=== Registered voters per country ===
Rank	Country	Registered voters (2018)	Registered voters (2022)
Europe		24,757	70,432 ▲
1	France	8,617 (Note: Including 247 Lebanese registered in Guadeloupe)	28,142 (Note: Including 3 Lebanese registered in Adelie land and 3 in Wallis and Futuna)▲
2	Germany	8,355	16,171 ▲
2	United Kingdom	1,824	6,535 ▲
3	Sweden	1,910	4,023 ▲
4	Belgium	1,053	3,092 ▲
5	Switzerland	889	2,601 ▲
6	Italy	729	2,128 ▲
7	Spain	376	1,226 ▲
8	Netherlands	228	965 ▲
9	Cyprus	—N/a	840 ▲
10	Denmark	250	706 ▲
11	Romania	270	696 ▲
12	Greece	256	528 ▲
13	Ukraine	—N/a	341 ▲
14	Russia	—N/a	323 ▲
15	Austria	—N/a	282 ▲
16	Ireland	—N/a	233 ▲
17	Hungary	—N/a	221 ▲
18	Poland	—N/a	215 ▲
19	Luxembourg	—N/a	200 ▲
20	Belarus	—N/a	172 ▲
21	Norway	—N/a	162 ▲
22	Czech Republic	—N/a	153 ▲
23	Portugal	—N/a	148 ▲
24	Rest of Europe	—N/a	329 ▲
Asia		12,669	56,874▲
1	UAE	5,166	25,066 ▲
2	Saudi Arabia	3,186	13,105 ▲
3	Qatar	1,832	7,344 ▲
4	Kuwait	1,878	5,760 ▲
5	Syria	—N/a	1,018 ▲
6	Turkey	—N/a	999 ▲
7	Oman	296	903 ▲
8	Iran	—N/a	642 ▲
9	Bahrain	—N/a	638 ▲
10	Jordan	—N/a	483 ▲
11	Iraq	—N/a	327 ▲
12	Armenia	311	192 ▼
13	Rest of Asia	—N/a	397 ▲
North America		21,793	56,680 ▲
1	USA	9,999	27,982 ▲
2	Canada	11,443	27,447 ▲
3	Mexico	351	1,242 ▲
4	Rest of North America	—N/a	9 ▲
Oceania		11,825	20,808 ▲
1	Australia	11,825	20,661 ▲
2	New Zealand	—N/a	147 ▲
Africa		6,671	18,869 ▲
1	Ivory Coast	2,345	6,070 ▲
2	Nigeria	1,263	2,580 ▲
3	Congos	341	1,428 ▲
4	Ghana	375	1,012 ▲
5	Gabon	251	848 ▲
6	Sierra Leone	260	724 ▲
7	Senegal	400	707 ▲
8	Egypt	257	709 ▲
9	Benin	217	518 ▲
10	Togo	—N/a	458 ▲
11	Zambia	—N/a	409 ▲
12	South Africa	312	406 ▲
13	Liberia	211	376 ▲
14	Guinea	439	532 ▲
15	Angola	—N/a	332 ▲
16	Mali	—N/a	317 ▲
17	Burkina Faso	—N/a	293 ▲
18	Morocco	—N/a	248 ▲
19	Cameroon	—N/a	228 ▲
20	Equatorial Guinea	—N/a	178 ▲
21	Gambia	—N/a	166 ▲
22	Rest of Africa	—N/a	330 ▲
South America		5,250	4,693 ▼
1	Brazil	2,112	2,861 ▲
2	Venezuela	1,497	991 ▼
3	Paraguay	924	67 ▼
4	Argentina	392	118 ▼
5	Colombia	325	273 ▼
6	Ecuador	—N/a	219 ▲
7	Rest of South America	—N/a	164 ▲
Total		82,965	228,356 ▲

== Candidates ==
After the deadline on 15 March 2022, the Ministry of Interior and Municipalities announced a record number 1043 candidates, which include 155 women, had been registered. On April 3, the ministry announced 103 lists running in 15 electoral districts.

=== Withdrawals ===
The Lebanese Forces saw many withdrawals of candidates specifically in Shia dominated areas such as Baalbek-Hermel which was blamed at Hezbollah and the Amal Movement for placing pressure on Shia March 14 candidates. The Kataeb Party also withdrew in Bekaa II electoral district.

== Opinion polls ==
A poll was conducted by the German Konrad Adenauer Foundation between 10 and 15 of December in 2021 of 1,200 Lebanese citizens eligible for voting. The survey found that nearly 40% of the people polled are willing to vote for an independent or 17 October Revolutionary candidate in the 2022 elections. Next comes Hezbollah and Amal with around 17 percent combined.

The study also found that 44.8% of polled Lebanese will not vote for the same party as they did in 2018. Christian parties Kataeb and the Lebanese Forces had seen a large increase in support in preference percentage compared to the figures of the last elections conducted by candidate and researcher Charbel Nahas in his book ‘Ritualism of the Sectarian Non-State'. In 2018, the Kataeb Party were only favored by 1.9% of the ones conducted compared to 2021's 4.2% and the Lebanese Forces had 7.7% compared to the 2021's 11.5%.

Poll source	Date(s) administered	Sample size	Amal	FPM	Future	Hezbollah	Independent	Kataeb	LF	PSP	Revolution	SSNP	Other
Konrad Adenauer Foundation	10–15 December 2021	1,200	3%	6.8%	6.2%	14.7%	25.7%	4.2%	11.5%	2.2%	12.3%	1.2%	12.2%
2018 general election	6 May 2018		9.41%	8.15%	10.22%	16.44%	5.34%	1.82%	7.32%	4.60%	–	1.33%	35.37%

== Political parties and coalitions ==
=== Future Movement ===
On 24 January 2022 Saad Hariri announced that he will suspend his role in Lebanese politics and that he would not run in the 2022 general elections. He also called on the Future Movement to follow suit and not run in the upcoming parliamentary elections nor nominate anyone to run on its behalf.

After Hariri's boycott, many Sunnis in North II and Akkar chose to follow boycott as well, after which his resignation created a large vacuum in Sunni politics.

Many Ex-Future politicians headed their own blocs, such as Bahaa Hariri and Fouad Sinora, and managed to secure 8 seats of the candidates that were affiliated with the Future Movement in parliament.

=== Kataeb Party ===
Candidates were announced on the 20 February 2022 under the campaign slogan Ma minsawim (ما منساوم). Kataeb leader Samy Gemayel insisted that the Kataeb party was the only one that has faced the fact of surrendering to Hezbollah's will, electing Michel Aoun as president and isolating Lebanon from its surroundings. Samy Gemayel emphasized:

We, as the Kataeb party, have alone faced surrender to Hezbollah’s will, isolating Lebanon from its surroundings, electing Michel Aoun as president, the electoral law that gave the majority to Hezbollah, and quotas and fictitious budgets such as taxes, power ships and seaports.

On 2 April Nadim Gemayel, cousin of Samy, promoted his candidacy in a speech during a small event.

Kataeb secured 4 seats for Salim Sayegh (3,477 votes), Nadim Gemayel (4,425 votes), Sami Gemayel (10,466 votes), and Elias Hankash (6,148 votes).

=== Shamalouna ===
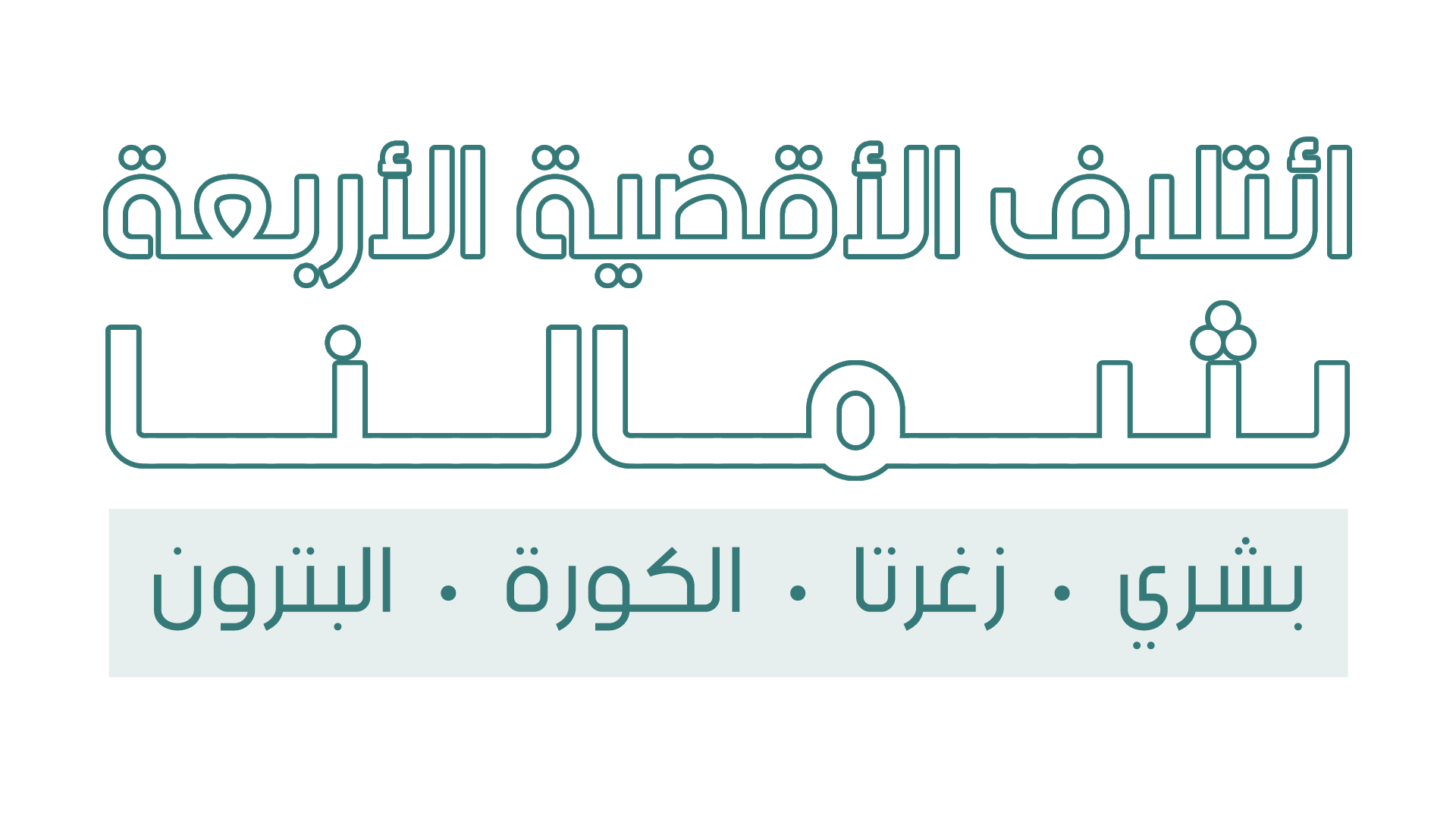
Shamaluna campaign logo

Shamalouna is a newly established coalition formed by independent groups from the North III electoral district (Bcharre-Zghorta-Batroun-Koura). Currently, the coalition consists of: Osos (Foundations), Koura Independent Community, Al Fekr El Horr (Free Thought), and Al Mashrou’ Al Badeel (The Alternative Project).The coalition took a pioneering unique step to choose its candidates; a round of primary elections through which voters selected their candidates. The primary elections were open to all change groups with no affiliation to mainstream political parties.

Shamaluna secured the Maronite seat in North III district with Michel Chawki Douaihy with 1,786 votes who is affiliated with the Osos foundation.

=== Taqaddom ===
Taqaddom, which is Arabic for "progress", is a social democratic movement that plans to advocate for social justice and sustainable development. The movement is allied with the Kataeb Party and Michel Moawad, both known for their anti-Hezbollah sentiment. The party presented 2 candidates and managed to win both seats in the Mount Lebanon IV electoral district.

=== Mada Network and the Secular Clubs ===
The Mada Network, a youth organization including secular clubs from various regions, universities, and syndicates, took part in the elections in a decentralized manner in three campaigns: Beirut Tuqawem (Beirut Resists), Al Janoub Youwajeh (The South Confronts), and Jil Al Taghyeer (The Generation of Change), further supporting 5 candidates: Ibrahim Mneimneh, Nuhad Yazbik Dumit and Samah Halwany in Beirut, Ali Khalife in the Tyre-Zahrani district and Verena El Amil in the Matn district. Among these candidates, Ibrahim Mneimneh won the Sunni seat in Beirut II. While the network primarily constitutes youth, it is known to have a clear political and economic orientation, positioning itself as anti-Hezbollah and left-leaning.

=== Independence Movement ===
The Independence Movement allied with the Kataeb Party and other Anti-Hezbollah independents to form a list called 'Shamal Al Mouwajaha' to bring down Gebran Bassil's presence in the North III electoral districts. The list managed to win 2 seats with the likes of Michel Mouawad and ally Adib Abdelmassih.

=== MMFD and Qadreen lists ===
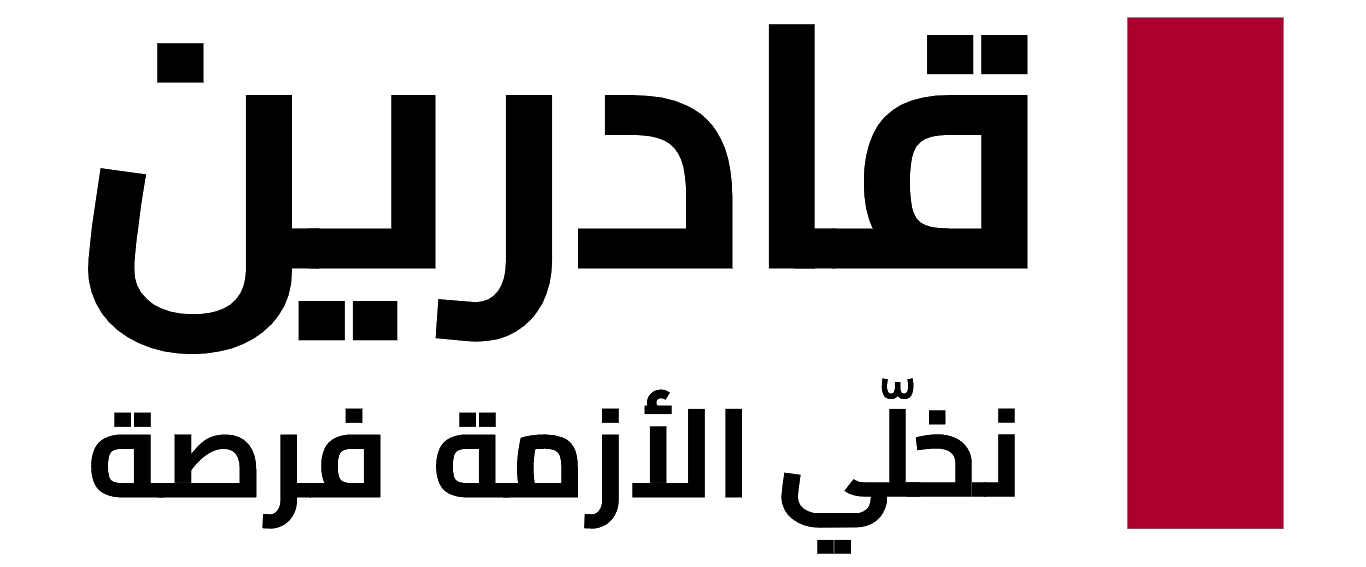
Qadreen campaign logo

In the 2022 Lebanese General elections, Citizens in a State (MMFD) hosted candidates in every electoral district in Lebanon in lists called "Qadreen" (Capable) led by Charbel Nahas of Beirut I. The coalition presented around 60 candidates with some allying with the LCP and other independents of the 17 October revolution.

MMFD was unable to secure any seats but was close with candidate and journalist Jad Ghosn but was defeated by Razi El Hajj by a difference of only 88 votes.

=== Popular Bloc ===
Myriam Skaff, member of a prominent family in the city of Zahle and candidate of the Greek catholic seat, leads a 6-member list in the electoral of Beqaa I but failed to win any seats. In total the list managed to receive 11,501 votes which was 938 more than the last elections.

=== Rifi Bloc ===
Ashraf Rifi, former Hariri ally, Internal Security Forces chief and Justice Minister, broke ranks with Hariri in 2016. In the 2016 Tripoli municipal election, he defeated Hariri's candidates and won 22 out of 24 seats. He fielded his own lists in the parliamentary election, in a move to challenge Hariri's dominance over Sunni politics. Ahead of the elections he profiled himself as a "hawk", unwilling to enter into talks with Hezbollah.

Rifi fielded lists in one electoral district; in North II, while allying with the Lebanese Forces. Ashraf Rifi hopes to lead the Sunni sect of North II amid Hariri's boycott and Mikati's withdrawal. Rifi's list in alliance with the Lebanese Forces secured 3 seats in North II district with Ashraf Rifi getting a Sunni seat with 11,594 votes, Elias Fouad Khoury getting the Maronite seat with 3,426 votes, and Jamil Abboud getting the Greek Orthodox seat with 79 votes.

=== Lebanese Forces ===
The Lebanese Forces presented 23 direct members along with many other allies in every electoral district, with the exception of Beirut II and South III, during the elections with a large anti-Hezbollah sentiment. The Lebanese Forces saw many withdrawal of candidates specifically in Shia dominated areas which was blamed at Hezbollah and the Amal Movement for placing pressure on Shia March 14 candidates. Lebanese Forces secured 19 seats including 1 from Rifi's Bloc and Chamoun.

After securing the most seats in parliament, Samir Geagea also emphasized his pledge not to vote for 30-year incumbent speaker Nabih Berri, citing corruption in the Bloc.

=== National Liberal Party ===
Camille Dory Chamoun announced his candidacy along with 3 others in the districts of Keserwan, Matn, Baabda and Chouf, in alliance with Lebanese Forces Party and the PSP. On April 9, Chamoun participated in launching the list in Abadieh. On May 1, during the opening of its commission headquarters in Keserwan district headed by Chamoun, the party presented its electoral points, which included: sovereignty, positive impartiality, independence of the judiciary, expanded administrative decentralization, restoring confidence in the banking sector, and the return of refugees and displaced persons.

The National Liberal Party was able to secure a single seat through Camille Chamoun in Baabda with 1,876 votes.

== Results ==
In a statement issued on 17 May 2022, two days after the elections, Interior Minister Bassam Mawlawi announced the results of the 2022 Lebanese parliamentary elections.

=== Turnout ===
Rank	Region (Governorate)	Turnout (2018)	Turnout (2022)	Change
1	Mount Lebanon I	66.51%	66.83% ▲	+0.32% ▲
2	Bekaa III	60.29%	57.17% ▼	-3.12% ▼
3	Mount Lebanon IV	52.14%	53.17% ▲	+1.03% ▲
4	Mount Lebanon II	51.38%	52.25% ▲	+0.87% ▲
5	Bekaa I	53.57%	52% ▼	-1.57% ▼
6	South II	49.90%	51.07% ▲	+1.17% ▲
7	Mount lebanon III	48.18%	50.72% ▲	+2.54% ▲
8	North I	48.26%	49.72% ▲	+1.46% ▲
Lebanon	—N/a	49.68%	49.19% ▼	-0.51% ▼
9	South I	54.92%	49.03% ▼	-5.89% ▼
10	North III	46.95%	48.85% ▲	+1.90% ▲
11	South III	48.90%	47.96% ▼	-0.94% ▼
12	Bekaa II	45.99%	44.39% ▼	-1.60% ▼
13	Beirut II	41.82%	41.72% ▼	-0.1% ▼
14	North II	45.39%	40.18% ▼	-5.21% ▼
15	Beirut I	33.19%	35.83% ▲	+2.64% ▲

Disclaimer: This listing uses a narrow definition of party votes, the preference votes cast for identified party candidates. For an overview of the voting percentages of the lists supported by different parties, see "Results by lists" table below.

Results by alliance and parties
Party	Candidates	Votes	%	+/-	Seats	+/-
Hezbollah	13	335,466	18.56	+2.12	13	▲1
Pro-Hezbollah Independents (Note: Includes votes of elected candidates: Yanal Solh and Melhem El Houjeiri who are both members of the Hezbollah parliamentary coalition al wafa' li al moukawama)	7	24,111	1.33	+0.78	2	▲2
Amal Movement	11	169,182	9.36	-0.05	11	▲1
Pro-Amal Independents (Note: Includes votes of elected candidates: Michel Moussa, Ali Assayran, Fady Alameh and Qassem Hachem who is not elected on behalf of the Baath party but as member of the Amal parliamentary bloc al tanmia wa al tahrir)	7	20,979	1.16	-1.38	4	▼3
March 8 Affiliates (Note: Includes votes of elected candidates: Jamil Al Sayyed and Mohammad Yehya)	6	32,913	1.82	-0.48	2	▼1
Marada Movement	6	21,672	1.20	-0.31	1	▼2
Pro-Marada Independents (Note: Includes votes of elected candidate: Melhem Tawk)	2	3,582	0.20	-0.11	1	▲1
Al-Ahbash	4	23,139	1.28	+0.21	2	▲1
Dignity Movement	2	7,515	0.42	-0.01	1	0
Pro-Dignity Movement Independents (Note: Includes votes of elected candidate: Jihad Al Samad)	4	9,642	0.53	-0.33	1	0
El Khazen Bloc	6	13,654	0.75	+0.18	1	▼1
Union Party	1	9,157	0.51	-0.35	1	0
Murr Bloc	6	9,106	0.50	-0.23	1	0
Syrian Social Nationalist Party (Note: Includes votes for candidates from both SSNP factions Banat and Hardan)	6	11,621	0.64	-0.69	0	▼3
Arab Unification Party	1	10,228	0.57	+0.14	0	0
Lebanese Arab Struggle Movement	1	2,670	0.15	+0.03	0	0
Hezbollah and allies	83	704,637	38.98	-0.60	41	▼4
Lebanese Forces	18	148,867	8.23	+0.91	14	▲2
Pro-LF Independents (Note: Includes votes of elected candidates: Ziad Hawat, Razi El Hajj, Ghada Ayyoub and Karim Pakradouni)	33	56,490	3.13	+0.84	4	▲1
Rifi Bloc	9	25,019	1.38	+0.57	1	▲1
National Liberal Party	4	4,967	0.28	+0.05	1	▲1
Lebanese Forces and allies	64	235,343	13.02	+3.41	20	▲5
Free Patriotic Movement	21	121,684	6.73	-1.42	16	▼2
Pro-FPM Independents (Note: Includes votes of elected candidate: Farid Al Boustani)	23	22,962	1.27	-4.05	1	▼5
Armenian Revolutionary Federation	5	12,499	0.69	-0.09	3	0
Lebanese Democratic Party	4	12,905	0.71	-0.04	0	▼1
Free Patriotic Movement and allies	53	170,050	9.40	-6.09	20	▼9
Ex-Future Movement	8	36,787	2.03	-8.19	2	▼11
Pro-FM Independents (Note: Includes votes of elected candidates: Mohammad Sleiman, Walid El Baarini, Sajeeh Atieh and Ahmad Rustom)	8	29,884	1.65	-2.71	4	▼3
Siniora candidates (Note: Includes votes of elected candidate: Bilal El Hocheymi)	14	29,945	1.66	New	1	New
Ex-Future Movement and allies	30	96,616	5.34	-9.24	7	▼13
Kataeb Party	5	24,602	1.36	-0.46	4	▲1
Pro-Kataeb Independents	5	9,002	0.50	New	0	New
Independence Movement	2	11,296	0.62	+0.13	1	0
Pro-Independence Movement (Note: Includes votes of elected candidate: Adib Abdelmassih)	6	3,363	0.19	New	1	New
Kataeb Party and allies	18	48,263	2.67	New	6	New
Taqaddom	2	20,988	1.16	New	2	New
Lebanese Communist Party and allies (Note: Includes votes of elected candidate: Elias Jaradeh endorsed by the Lebanese Communist Party)	10	19,316	1.07	+0.46	1	▲1
Mada (Note: Mada fielded 5 candidates within 3 campaigns: Beirut tuqawem in Beirut 2, Jil el taghyeer in Metn and Al Janoub youwajeh in Zahrani-Sour)	5	18,238	1.01	New	1	New
Watani	10	10,574	0.58	New	1	New
Khatt Ahmar	2	6,979	0.39	New	1	New
Lana	1	6,684	0.37	New	1	New
Osos Lebanon	2	3,469	0.19	New	1	New
ReLebanon	3	1,064	0.06	New	1	New
Citizens in a State	56	25,529	1.41	+1.09	0	0
National Bloc	5	11,016	0.61	New	0	New
Beirut Madinati	13	6,564	0.36	New	0	New
Popular Observatory	2	4,895	0.27	+0.20	0	0
Aamieh 17 October	2	4,012	0.22	New	0	New
Sabaa Party	4	2,019	0.11	-0.58	0	▼1
Lihaqqi	1	928	0.05	-0.14	0	0
Thuwar Beirut	1	485	0.03	New	0	New
October 17 Independents (Note: Includes votes of elected candidates: Melhem Khalaf, Firas Hamdan and Yassine Yassine)	86	94,594	5.23	New	3	New
October 17	205	237,354	13.13	+10.60	12	▲11
Progressive Socialist Party and allies (Note: Includes votes of elected candidates: Marwan Hamadeh and Raji El Saad both members of the Democratic Gathering)	10	75,485	4.18	-0.42	8	▼1
Frem Bloc (Note: Includes votes of elected candidate: Jamil Abboud)	7	19,582	1.08	New	2	New
Al-Jama'a Al-Islamiyya	5	22,249	1.23	+0.41	1	▲1
National Dialogue Party Bloc	11	17,780	0.98	+0.13	1	0
Azm Movement Bloc	10	15,355	0.85	-1.40	1	▼3
Daher Bloc	6	14,648	0.81	New	1	New
Popular Nasserist Organization	1	7,341	0.41	-0.15	1	0
Popular Bloc	6	11,501	0.64	+0.04	0	0
Sawa/Movement supported candidates	6	7,118	0.39	New	0	New
Bahaa Hariri Bloc	9	2,259	0.12	New	0	New
YES! Lebanon Group	2	1,641	0.09	New	0	New
Hunchak	1	1,068	0.06	-0.03	0	0
Independents (Note: Includes votes of elected candidates: Nabil Badr, Abdelrahman Al Bizri, Charbel Masaad, Ghassan Skaff, Ihab Matar, Jean Talouzian and Haidar Nasser)	192	119,078	6.59	+1.88	7	▲7
Others	266	315,105	17.43	-0.78	22	▲4
Totals	719	1,807,818	100.0	–	128	
Blank votes		19,308				
Votes with no preferences		66,857				
Total Votes		1,893,983				
Votes canceled		57,700				
Total Registered who voted/turnout		1,951,683	49.19	-0.51		
Registered voters		3,967,507	100			

Results by lists
List	Electoral district	Votes	% nationwide	% of electoral district	Candidates	Members elected	Parties
"Hope and Loyalty" (South III)	South III	197,822	10.44	86.33	11	9	Amal-Hezbollah-SSNP-LDP
"Hope and Loyalty" (Bekaa III)	Bekaa III	154,358	8.15	81.44	10	9	Amal-Hezbollah-FPM
"Hope and Loyalty" (South II)	South II	138,242	7.30	85.89	7	7	Amal-Hezbollah
"Partnership and Will"	Mount Lebanon IV	83,389	4.40	46.69	12	7	PSP-LF-NLP
"United for Change"	Mount Lebanon IV	42,077	2.22	23.56	12	3	17 October revolution-LCP
"National Moderation"	North I	41,848	2.21	28.45	7	4	Ex-Future
"Akkar First"	North I	41,761	2.20	28.39	7	3	FPM-SSNP-Independents
"Mountain List"	Mount Lebanon IV	41,545	2.19	23.26	11	3	LDP-FPM-AUP-Al-Ahbash
"Strong Republic Pulse"	North III	39,844	2.10	32.84	10	3	LF
"Unity of Beirut"	Beirut II	36,962	1.95	25.07	8	3	Hezbollah-Amal-FPM-SSNP-LDP
"We were... and staying"	Mount Lebanon I	34,192	1.81	29.04	8	3	FPM-Hezbollah
"National Accordance"	Mount Lebanon III	33,962	1.79	40.38	6	3	Hezbollah-FPM-Amal-LDP
"Beirut Change"	Beirut II	32,823	1.73	22.26	11	3	17 October revolution-NB
"Together towards Change"	South III	30,384	1.60	13.26	11	2	17 October revolution-LCP
"Nation's Rescue"	North II	30,006	1.58	21.17	11	3	Rifi-LF
"Sovereignty and Decision"	Mount Lebanon III	29,801	1.57	35.43	6	3	LF-PSP-NLP
"Popular Will"	North II	29,277	1.55	20.65	10	3	DM-Al-Ahbash-Marada
"Best Tomorrow"	Bekaa II	28,920	1.53	44.13	5	3	Amal-UP-FPM-LASM
"Lebanon for Us"	North II	28,041	1.48	19.78	11	2	Ex-Future
"With You We Can till the End"	Mount Lebanon I	27,939	1.48	23.73	8	2	LF-NLP
"Zahle the Message"	Bekaa I	27,872	1.47	30.34	6	3	Hezbollah-FPM-Tashnag
"North Unity"	North III	26,475	1.40	21.82	8	2	Marada-SSNP-Tawk
"Nation's Shout"	Mount Lebanon I	25,713	1.36	21.84	8	2	Frem-Kataeb-National Bloc
"Zahle the Sovereignty"	Bekaa I	25,646	1.35	27.92	7	3	LF-Pro-Siniora
"Building the State"	Bekaa III	23,308	1.23	12.30	10	1	LF-Independents
"North of Confrontation"	North III	22,613	1.19	18.64	9	2	IM-Kataeb-Independents
"Metn of Change"	Mount Lebanon II	22,523	1.19	24.33	7	2	Kataeb
"Metn of Freedom"	Mount Lebanon II	21,301	1.12	23.01	7	2	LF-NLP-Yes!Lebanon
"We were... and staying for Metn"	Mount Lebanon II	20,533	1.08	22.18	5	2	FPM
"This is Beirut"	Beirut II	20,439	1.08	13.86	11	2	Ex-Future-JI
"Beirut Requires a Heart"	Beirut II	19,421	1.03	13.17	11	1	NDP
"Akkar"	North I	19,334	1.02	13.14	7	0	LF-Independents
"National Independent Decision"	Bekaa II	19,054	1.01	29.07	6	2	PSP-Ex-Future-JI
"We Vote for Change"	South I	18,783	0.99	30.96	5	3	PNO-Independents
"Beirut Confronts"	Beirut II	18,060	0.95	12.25	10	1	Pro-Siniora-PSP
"We are staying here"	North III	17,077	0.90	14.07	7	2	FPM-SSNP
"Real Change"	North II	16,825	0.89	11.87	11	1	JI-Independents
"For the People"	North II	16,215	0.86	11.44	11	1	Azm-PSP-Independents
"Together Stronger"	Mount Lebanon II	15,997	0.84	17.28	8	2	Murr-Tashnag-SSNP
"Independent Sovereignists"	Bekaa I	15,477	0.82	16.85	6	1	Daher-Independents
"The Heart of Independent Lebanon"	Mount Lebanon I	14,979	0.79	12.72	8	1	Khazen-Independents
"For Beirut"	Beirut II	14,931	0.79	10.13	9	1	Al-Ahbash
"Uprise... for Sovereignty for Justice"	North II	14,181	0.75	10.00	9	1	17 October revolution
"Akkar the Change"	North I	14,145	0.75	9.61	7	0	17 October revolution
"Our North"	North III	14,121	0.75	11.64	10	1	17 October revolution
"Our Unity in Saida and Jezzine"	South I	13,948	0.74	22.99	4	2	LF-Pro-Siniora
"Loyalty to Akkar"	North I	13,619	0.72	9.26	7	0	Azm-Independents
"Beirut, We are for Her"	Beirut I	13,220	0.70	28.55	6	2	LF-Hunchak
"Baabda the Change"	Mount Lebanon III	13,201	0.70	15.70	5	0	17 October revolution-NB
"Popular Bloc"	Bekaa I	12,064	0.64	13.13	6	0	Popular Bloc
"Rising up for Akkar"	North I	11,885	0.63	8.08	7	0	Independents
"Moderation is our Force"	South I	11,719	0.62	19.32	3	0	Amal-Independents
"Towards Statehood"	Mount Lebanon II	11,555	0.61	12.48	5	0	MMFD-17 October revolution
"Our Plain and the Mountain"	Bekaa II	11,397	0.60	17.39	5	1	17 October revolution
"Freedom is a Decision"	Mount Lebanon I	11,292	0.60	9.59	6	0	Independents
"Lebanon the Sovereignty"	Beirut I	11,271	0.60	24.34	8	2	Kataeb-Independents
"We were... and staying for Beirut"	Beirut I	10,950	0.58	23.65	8	2	FPM-Tashnag
"Together for Change"	South II	10,061	0.53	6.25	7	0	LCP-17 October revolution
"Together for Saida and Jezzine"	South I	9,846	0.52	16.23	5	0	FPM-Independents
"For My Country"	Beirut I	8,261	0.44	17.84	8	2	17 October revolution
"Zahle Uprises"	Bekaa I	7,713	0.41	8.40	5	0	17 October revolution
"Embracing State"	South II	7,405	0.39	4.60	4	0	Independents
"Nation's Sovereignty"	Mount Lebanon IV	6,082	0.32	3.41	9	0	JI-Independents
"Coalition for Change"	Bekaa III	5,633	0.30	2.97	9	0	17 October revolution
"Our Bekaa First"	Bekaa II	5,316	0.28	8.11	5	0	LF-Independents
"The Free Decision"	South II	5,240	0.28	3.26	3	0	Independents
"Baabda Uprises"	Mount Lebanon III	5,010	0.26	5.96	4	0	Independents
"We are the Change"	South I	4,919	0.26	8.11	5	0	17 October revolution
"Your Voice is Revolution"	Mount Lebanon IV	3,438	0.18	1.92	10	0	Civil society
"Third Republic"	North II	3,318	0.18	2.34	9	0	Civil society
"Towards Citizenship"	North I	3,154	0.17	2.14	6	0	LCP-MMFD
"Independents against Corruption"	Bekaa III	2,819	0.15	1.49	9	0	Independents
"To Preserve Beirut"	Beirut II	2,387	0.13	1.62	9	0	Bahaa Hariri Bloc
"We are Able" (Bekaa III)	Bekaa III	1,937	0.10	1.02	4	0	MMFD
"We are Able" (Mount Lebanon I)	Mount Lebanon I	1,926	0.10	1.64	4	0	MMFD
"We are Able" (North II)	North II	1,839	0.10	1.30	6	0	MMFD
"We are Able" (Beirut II)	Beirut II	1,797	0.09	1.22	6	0	MMFD
"We are the Change" (Mount Lebanon I)	Mount Lebanon I	1,681	0.09	1.43	5	0	17 October revolution
"We are Able" (Mount Lebanon IV)	Mount Lebanon IV	1,596	0.08	0.89	6	0	MMFD
"We are Able" (Beirut I)	Beirut I	1,510	0.08	3.26	4	0	MMFD
"Clans and Families for Development"	Bekaa III	1,491	0.08	0.79	6	0	Independents
"The Change"	Bekaa I	1,440	0.08	1.57	5	0	Independents
"Akkar Uprises"	North I	1,371	0.07	0.93	5	0	17 October revolution
"We are able to face"	Bekaa I	1,316	0.07	1.43	4	0	MMFD
"Stability and Development"	North II	1,306	0.07	0.92	10	0	Bahaa Hariri Bloc
"We are Able" (South I)	South I	1,128	0.06	1.86	4	0	MMFD
"Beirut My City" (Beirut I)	Beirut I	1,089	0.06	2.35	5	0	17 October revolution
"We are able to Change"	North III	974	0.05	0.80	6	0	MMFD-LCP
"We are Able" (Mount Lebanon III)	Mount Lebanon III	952	0.05	1.13	3	0	MMFD
"Voice of the South"	South III	952	0.05	0.41	5	0	Independents
"We are the Change" (Mount Lebanon III)	Mount Lebanon III	766	0.04	0.91	3	0	17 October revolution
"Dawn of Change"	North II	672	0.04	0.47	7	0	Independents
"Sovereignists Metnists"	Mount Lebanon II	667	0.04	0.72	7	0	17 October revolution-Independents
"We are Able" (Bekaa II)	Bekaa II	653	0.03	1.00	4	0	MMFD
"The Mountain Uprises"	Mount Lebanon IV	491	0.03	0.27	8	0	17 October revolution-Independents
"Together We Can"	Mount Lebanon III	417	0.02	0.50	6	0	Independents
"Beirut My City" (Beirut II)	Beirut II	358	0.02	0.24	6	0	17 October revolution
"Talk and Action"	Bekaa I	332	0.02	0.36	5	0	Independents
"Voice of Change"	South I	324	0.02	0.53	3	0	Independents
"Yes to Beirut"	Beirut II	250	0.01	0.17	6	0	Independents
"Wake Your Voice"	North III	230	0.01	0.19	5	0	Independents
"Towards Change"	Bekaa II	192	0.01	0.29	4	0	Kataeb-Independents
"Youth's Ambition"	North II	79	0.01	0.06	5	0	Independents
Blank votes		19,308	1.02				
Total		1,893,983	100.00		719	128	

Demographic results
Party list	Kataeb and allies		Tashnag		FPM		LF and allies		Oct 17 movement		Hezbollah		Amal		PSP		Independent and other parties		Association of Islamic Charitable Projects		FM and allies		Total (+ turnout by sect)	
Party list	No.	%	No.	%	No.	%	No.	%	No.	%	No.	%	No.	%	No.	%	No.	%	No.	%	No.	%	No.	%
Sunni	2,286	0.49%	246	0.05%	10,149	2.16%	24,535	5.22%	70,679	15.05%	9,343	1.99%	12,222	2.6%	16,911	3.6%	197,189	41.99%	16,324	3.48%	159,707	34.01%	469,591	100% (40.11%)
Shia	105	0.02%	225	0.04%	12,892	2.17%	2,718	0.46%	63,105	10.61%	332,395	55.86%	156,132	26.24%	1,060	0.18%	21,244	3.57%	5,128	0.86%	619	0.1%	595,004	100% (51.15%)
Maronite	27,718	6.62%	229	0.05%	60,816	14.51%	124,155	29.63%	33,575	8.01%	2,850	0.68%	5,100	1.22%	2,904	0.69%	156,495	37.35%	497	0.12%	4,349	1.04%	418,988	100% (54.68%)
Eastern Orthodox	4,662	6.08%	247	0.32%	13,671	17.84%	24,757	32.3%	11,050	14.42%	1,194	1.56%	2,400	3.13%	1,165	1.52%	13,367	17.44%	297	0.39%	4,038	5.27%	76,648	100% (29.06%)
Druze	94	0.11%	—N/a	—N/a	12,262	14%	1,397	1.6%	23,019	26.29%	565	0.65%	2,153	2.46%	43,729	49.94%	2,201	2.51%	10	0.01%	2,136	2.44%	87,566	100% (39.48%)
Melkite	1,745	2.94%	210	0.35%	8,761	14.78%	23,792	40.15%	7,118	12.01%	926	1.56%	3,301	5.57%	457	0.77%	12,664	21.37%	121	0.2%	163	0.28%	59,258	100% (34.62%)
Armenian Orthodox	5,865	21.91%	7,869	29.39%	704	2.63%	3,399	12.7%	6,904	25.79%	36	0.13%	544	2.03%	202	0.75%	1,188	4.44%	59	0.22%	1	0%	26,771	100% (31.86%)
Other Minorities (Note: The Minorities quota includes six different Christian sects Syriac Orthodox, Syriac Catholic, Latin Catholics, Assyrians, Chaldean Catholics and Copts.) (Note: In 2022, 65,785 people belonging to Christian minorities were registered, but most of them were included in “other”.)	77	—N/a	282	—N/a	43	—N/a	127	—N/a	137	—N/a	12	—N/a	22	—N/a	17	—N/a	64	—N/a	2	—N/a	11	—N/a	—N/a	—N/a
Alawites	4	0.04%	—N/a	—N/a	1,613	17.74%	179	1.97%	54	0.01%	—N/a	—N/a	—N/a	—N/a	—N/a	—N/a	5,577	61.35%	2	0.02%	1,161	12.77%	9,090	100% (23.59%
Armenian Catholic	483	8.45%	1,027	17.96%	256	4.48%	508	8.89%	2,478	43.34%	174	3.04%	224	3.92%	101	1.77%	453	7.92%	7	0.12%	6	0.1%	5,717	100% (28.62%)
"Others" (Note: Presumably consisting mainly of individuals whose sectarian affiliation has not been identified and/or individuals not belonging to any of the 18 recognized sects.)	4,677	—N/a	2,070	—N/a	22,762	—N/a	28,022	—N/a	18,338	—N/a	11,912	—N/a	9,047	—N/a	8,011	—N/a	23,679	—N/a	125	—N/a	3,439	—N/a	132,082	—N/a
Total	48,263	2.67%	12,499	0.69%	144,646	8%	235,343	13.02%	237,354	13.13%	359,577	19.89%	190,161	10.52%	75,485	4.18%	384,735	21.28%	23,139	1.28%	96,616	5.34%	1,807,818	100% (45.57%)
Source: UNDP.org

=== Results by constituency ===
- 2022 Lebanese general election in Beirut I
- 2022 Lebanese general election in North I
- 2022 Lebanese general election in North III
- 2022 Lebanese general election in Bekaa I
- 2022 Lebanese general election in Mount Lebanon I

== International reactions ==
- France – French ambassador to Lebanon Anne Grillo said on Twitter: "My Lebanese friends, on this day that witnesses important elections for the future of your country, you have the opportunity to vote for those who will represent you in Parliament, and they will have the task of defending your rights and aspirations to build the Lebanon you want".
- Armenia – Armenia's Foreign Ministry sent its congratulations to Lebanon on Twitter: "Armenia stands with brotherly Lebanon. Looking forward to deepening our cooperation".
- Arab League – Assistant Secretary-General of the Arab League, Ahmed Rashid Khattabi, met with the minister of information, Ziad Makary, after the general elections and discussed joint social and economic issues within the Arab League. Makary also reiterated Lebanon's intention to host the events of “Beirut the capital of Arab media” for the year 2023 after the election's success.
- United Nations – UN Secretary General Antonio Guterres called on Lebanon to form an inclusive government and to immediate quick reform on the country's dire situation. He said that he: “looks forward to the swift formation of an inclusive government that can finalize the agreement with the International Monetary Fund and accelerate the implementation of reforms necessary to set Lebanon on the path to recovery”. The UN Secretary General also called on the elected parliament to: "urgently adopt all legislation necessary to stabilize the economy and improve governance.”

== See also ==
- List of members of the 2022-2026 Lebanese Parliament
- 2022–2025 Lebanese presidential election
- 2022 Speaker of the Lebanese Parliament election
- Lebanese liquidity crisis
- 17 October Revolution
- 2020 Beirut explosion
