= North II =

- Constituency for the Parliament of Lebanon
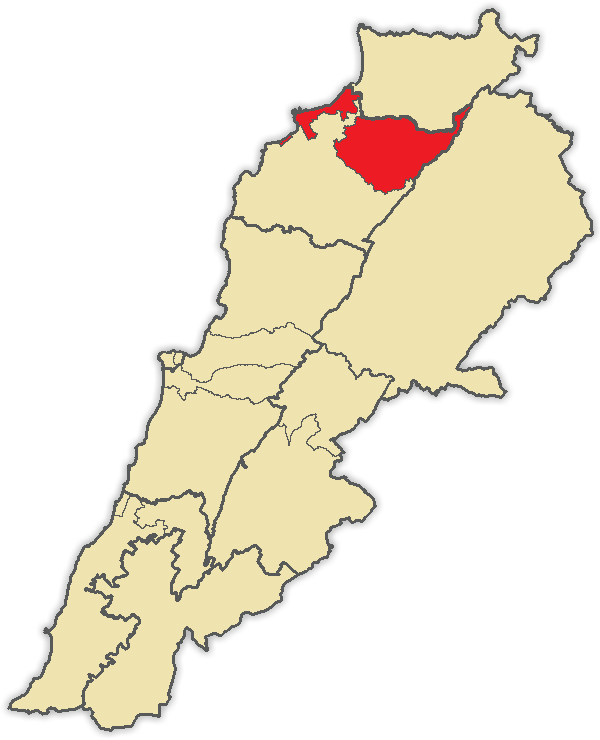
- Governorate: North
- Electorate: 350,147 (2018)

Current constituency
- Created: 2017
- Number of members: 11 (8 Sunni, 1 Alawite, 1 Greek Orthodox, 1 Maronite)

North II (Arabic: دائرة الشمال الثانية) is an electoral district in Lebanon, as per the 2017 vote law. The district elects 11 members of the Lebanese National Assembly – 8 Sunni, 1 Alawite, 1 Greek Orthodox and 1 Maronite. The constituency contains three 'minor districts', Tripoli (corresponding to Tripoli District), Miniyeh and Danniyeh (the latter two corresponding to the Miniyeh-Danniyeh District). The Tripoli 'minor district' elects 5 Sunnis, 1 Alawite, 1 Greek Orthodox and 1 Maronite parliamentarian, the Miniyeh 'minor district' elects 1 Sunni and the Danniyeh 'minor district' elects 2 Sunni parliamentarians.

Under the previous electoral law, Tripoli and Miniyeh-Danniyeh constituted two different constituencies.

== Electorate ==
The electorate is predominately Sunni (82.91%), with significant minorities of Greek Orthodox (6.24%), Alawites (6.04%) and Maronites (3.5%). 0.51% of the electorate are Armenian Orthodox, 0.32% Armenian Catholics and 0.59% belong to other Christian communities.

Below data from 2017;

District	Sunni		Shia		Druze		Alawite		Maronite		Greek Orthodox		Greek Catholic		Armenian Orthodox		Armenian Catholic		Syriac Orthodox		Syriac Catholic		Other Minorities (Note: The Minorities quota includes six different Christian sects Syriac Orthodox, Syriac Catholic, Latin Catholics, Assyrians, Chaldean Catholics and Copts.)		Evangelical		Jews		"Others" (Note: Presumably consisting mainly of individuals whose sectarian affiliation has not been identified and/or individuals not belonging to any of the 18 recognized sects.)		Total
District	No.	%	No.	%	No.	%	No.	%	No.	%	No.	%	No.	%	No.	%	No.	%	No.	%	No.	%	No.	%	No.	%	No.	%	No.	%	No.
Miniyeh-Danniyeh (Note: The Miniyeh-Danniyeh qada was split into two separate minor districts within the North II electoral district under the 2017 vote law.)	101,971	85.93	312	0.26	3	0.00	74	0.06	7,449	6.28	8,171	6.89	176	0.15	16	0.01	6	0.01	17	0.01	7	0.01	37	0.03	42	0.04			390	0.33	118,671
Tripoli	182,552	81.27	2,718	1.21	33	0.01	15,806	7.04	5,247	2.34	12,075	5.38	1,477	0.66	1,751	0.78	265	0.12	300	0.13	215	0.10	540	0.24	583	0.26	38	0.02	1,019	0.45	224,619
Source: Lebanon Files

== 2018 election ==
With the new election law in place, the heavyweights of Tripoli politics went in different directions. Justifying the decision to head to the polls alone, the Future Movement general secretary Ahmed Hariri stated that "[w]e will form our own list because we came to understand that a lot of people had taken advantage of us...". In Dennieh, the 28-year old Sami Fatfat overtook his father Ahmad Fatfat's mantle as the Future Movement candidate. Mohammad Safadi opted to stay out of the electoral race, calling for support to the Future list. Safadi announced his decision at a press conference at the Safadi Cultural Center.

All in all, 8 lists were registered in the second northern electoral district; the "Determination" list of former Prime Minister Najib Mikati, the Future Movement list, a list led by Ashraf Rifi, the "National Dignity" list (alliance between Faisal Karami and Jihad Samad, with participation of Al-Ahbash and Marada Movement), the "People's Decision" list (alliance between Free Patriotic Movement and Kamal Kheir, joined by independents), the "Kulluna Watani" (We are all National) list (Sabaa Party, Movement of Citizens in the State, Socialist Arab Lebanon Vanguard Party, Resistance Movement and independents), the "Independent Decision" list (alliance between al-Jamaa al-Islamiah, ex-parliamentarian Mesbah Ahdab and independents) and the "Independent Civil Society" list (independents).

Mikati launched his "Determination" list at an electoral meeting at the Quality Inn Hotel in Tripoli on March 18, 2018. Amongst his candidates were former minister Jean Obeid and Nicolas Nahas and incumbent Future parliamentarian Kazim Kheir. Kheir was denied the Minnieh spot on the Future Movement list, a move that pushed him to join the Mikati list instead.

=== Result by lists ===
List	Votes	% of electoral district	Seats	Members elected	Parties
"Future for the North"	51,937	35.47	5	Alameddine, Kabbara, Jisr, Fatfat, Jamali	Future
"Determination"	42,019	28.70	4	Mikati, Darwish, Obeid, Nahas	Azm Movement
"National Dignity"	29,101	19.88	2	Samad, Karami	Karami-Ahbash-Marada
"Sovereign Lebanon"	9,656	6.59	0		Rifi
"Independent Decision"	4,184	2.86	0		Ahdab-JI
"People's Decision"	4,122	2.82	0		FPM-Kheir
"Kulluna Watani"	2,680	1.83	0		Civil society-Lebanon Vanguard
"Independent Civil Society"	448	0.31	0		

=== Result by candidate ===
Name	Sect	List	Party	Votes	% of electoral district	% of preferential votes for sect seat	% of list	Elected?
Najib Mikati	Sunni (Tripoli)	"Determination"	Azm Movement	21,300	14.55	29.78	50.69	Yes
Jihad Samad	Sunni (Dennieh)	"National Dignity"		11,897	8.13	36.45	40.88	Yes
Osman Alameddine	Sunni (Minnieh)	"Future for the North"	Future	10,221	6.98	50.59	19.68	Yes
Mohammad Kabbara	Sunni (Tripoli)	"Future for the North"	Future	9,600	6.56	13.42	18.48	Yes
Samir Jisr	Sunni (Tripoli)	"Future for the North"	Future	9,527	6.51	13.32	18.34	Yes
Sami Fatfat	Sunni (Dennieh)	"Future for the North"	Future	7,943	5.42	24.33	15.29	Yes
Faisal Karami	Sunni (Tripoli)	"National Dignity"	Dignity Movement	7,126	4.87	9.96	24.49	Yes
Kazim Kheir	Sunni (Minnieh)	"Determination"	Azm Movement	6,754	4.61	33.43	16.07	
Qassem Abdel Aziz	Sunni (Dennieh)	"Future for the North"	Future	6,382	4.36	19.55	12.29	
Ashraf Rifi	Sunni (Tripoli)	"Sovereign Lebanon"	Rifi Bloc	5,931	4.05	8.29	61.42	
Taha Naji	Sunni (Tripoli)	"National Dignity"	Al-Ahbash	4,152	2.84	5.80	14.27	
Mohammed Fadhil	Sunni (Dennieh)	"Determination"	Azm Movement	4,006	2.74	12.27	9.53	
Ahmed Mahmoud Omran	Alawite (Tripoli)	"National Dignity"		2,794	1.91	45.12	9.60	
Alawi Darwish	Alawite (Tripoli)	"Determination"	Azm Movement	2,246	1.53	36.27	5.35	Yes
Kamal Kheir	Sunni (Minnieh)	"People's Decision"		2,128	1.45	10.53	51.63	
Dima Jamali	Sunni (Tripoli)	"Future for the North"	Future	2,066	1.41	2.89	3.98	Yes
Wasim Alwan	Sunni (Tripoli)	"Independent Decision"	al-Jama'a al-Islamiah	2,000	1.37	2.80	47.80	
Mohamed Nadim Jisr	Sunni (Tripoli)	"Determination"	Azm Movement	1,477	1.01	2.06	3.52	
Rafli Anton Diab	Maronite (Tripoli)	"National Dignity"	Marada	1,286	0.88	30.06	4.42	
Jean Obeid	Maronite (Tripoli)	"Determination"	Azm Movement	1,136	0.78	26.55	2.70	Yes
Chadi Nachabe	Sunni (Tripoli)	"Future for the North"	Future	1,135	0.78	1.59	2.19	
Nicolas Nahas	Greek Orthodox (Tripoli)	"Determination"	Azm Movement	1,057	0.72	41.91	2.52	Yes
Walid Sawalhi	Sunni (Tripoli)	"Future for the North"	Future	994	0.68	1.39	1.91	
Yehia Mawloud	Sunni (Tripoli)	"Kulluna Watani"		909	0.62	1.27	33.92	
Mesbah Ahdab	Sunni (Tripoli)	"Independent Decision"		908	0.62	1.27	21.70	
George Bkassini	Maronite (Tripoli)	"Future for the North"	Future	903	0.62	21.11	1.74	
Nima Mahfoud	Greek Orthodox (Tripoli)	"Future for the North"	Future	800	0.55	31.72	1.54	
Rashid Mokhtam	Sunni (Tripoli)	"Determination"	Azm Movement	746	0.51	1.04	1.78	
Tony Maroni	Maronite (Tripoli)	"People's Decision"	FPM	675	0.46	15.78	16.38	
Oussama Amoun	Sunni (Dennieh)	"Sovereign Lebanon"	Rifi Bloc	644	0.44	1.97	6.67	
Ali Ayoubi	Sunni (Tripoli)	"Sovereign Lebanon"	Rifi Bloc	609	0.42	0.85	6.31	
Ragheb Raad	Sunni (Dennieh)	"Sovereign Lebanon"	Rifi Bloc	537	0.37	1.65	5.56	
Adel Zreika	Sunni (Minnieh)	"National Dignity"	Dignity Movement)	494	0.34	2.45	1.70	
Farah Issa	Greek Orthodox (Tripoli)	"Kulluna Watani"		452	0.31	17.92	16.87	
Mirfat Hawz	Sunni (Tripoli)	"Determination"	Azm Movement	452	0.31	0.63	1.08	
Leila Chahoud	Alawite (Tripoli)	"Future for the North"	Future	443	0.30	7.15	0.85	
Walid Masri	Sunni (Minnieh)	"Sovereign Lebanon"	Rifi Bloc	344	0.23	1.70	3.56	
Abdel Salam Trad	Sunni (Dennieh)	"Independent Decision"		322	0.22	0.99	7.70	
Malek Moulawi	Sunni (Tripoli)	"Kulluna Watani"		299	0.20	0.42	11.16	
Dany Othman	Sunni (Dennieh)	"Kulluna Watani"		297	0.20	0.91	11.08	
Mahmoud Shehadeh	Alawite (Tripoli)	"People's Decision"		282	0.19	4.55	6.84	
Tawfiq Sultan	Sunni (Tripoli)	"Determination"	Azm Movement	281	0.19	0.39	0.67	
Badr Eid	Alawite (Tripoli)	"Sovereign Lebanon"	Rifi Bloc	277	0.19	4.47	2.87	
Mohamed Salhab	Sunni (Tripoli)	"Sovereign Lebanon"	Rifi Bloc	269	0.18	0.38	2.79	
Jamal Badawi	Sunni (Tripoli)	"Independent Civil Society"		258	0.18	0.36	57.59	
Mohammed Walid Qamaruddin	Sunni (Tripoli)	"Sovereign Lebanon"	Rifi Bloc	249	0.17	0.35	2.58	
Ali Hermoush	Sunni (Dennieh)	"People's Decision"		229	0.16	0.70	5.56	
Abdel Nasser Masri	Sunni (Tripoli)	"National Dignity"	Lebanese People's Congress	215	0.15	0.30	0.74	
Mohamed Ahmed	Sunni (Minnieh)	"Independent Decision"		199	0.14	0.98	4.76	
Khaled Tadmori	Sunni (Tripoli)	"Sovereign Lebanon"	Rifi Bloc	199	0.14	0.28	2.06	
Khalid Roumieh	Sunni (Tripoli)	"People's Decision"		192	0.13	0.27	4.66	
Ahmed Shandab	Sunni (Dennieh)	"People's Decision"		146	0.10	0.45	3.54	
Jihad Yusuf	Sunni (Dennieh)	"Determination"	Azm Movement	131	0.09	0.40	0.31	
Mohammad Monzer Maaliki	Sunni (Tripoli)	"Kulluna Watani"	Lebanon Vanguard	131	0.09	0.18	4.89	
Tony Khalifa	Maronite (Tripoli)	"Independent Decision"		129	0.09	3.02	3.08	
Mohammed Safouh Yakan	Sunni (Tripoli)	"National Dignity"	National Gathering	127	0.09	0.18	0.44	
Nariman Chamaa	Sunni (Tripoli)	"Kulluna Watani"		111	0.08	0.16	4.14	
Moussa Khoury	Maronite (Tripoli)	"Kulluna Watani"		106	0.07	2.48	3.96	
Ayman Nouruddin Omar	Sunni (Tripoli)	"National Dignity"		99	0.07	0.14	0.34	
Wathek Moukaddam	Sunni (Tripoli)	"Kulluna Watani"		97	0.07	0.14	3.62	
George Jalad	Greek Orthodox (Tripoli)	"Sovereign Lebanon"	Rifi Bloc	86	0.06	3.41	0.89	
Ali Farouk Samad	Sunni (Dennieh)	"Independent Decision"		84	0.06	0.26	2.01	
Hisham Ibrahim (Al Moaie)	Alawite (Tripoli)	"Independent Decision"		68	0.05	1.10	1.63	
Nastas Koshary	Greek Orthodox (Tripoli)	"People's Decision"		52	0.04	2.06	1.26	
Ahmed Douhaiby	Sunni (Minnieh)	"Kulluna Watani"		51	0.03	0.25	1.90	
Hassan Hassan Khalil	Alawite (Tripoli)	"Independent Civil Society"		47	0.03	0.76	10.49	
Menzeh Sawan	Greek Orthodox (Tripoli)	"Independent Decision"		43	0.03	1.70	1.03	
Halim Zani	Maronite (Tripoli)	"Sovereign Lebanon"	Rifi Bloc	43	0.03	1.01	0.45	
Nariman Jamal	Sunni (Tripoli)	"Independent Decision"		41	0.03	0.06	0.98	
Zeinelddine Dib	Alawite (Tripoli)	"Kulluna Watani"		36	0.02	0.58	1.34	
Fadi Jamal	Greek Orthodox (Tripoli)	"Independent Civil Society"		32	0.02	1.27	7.14	
Heba Naja	Sunni (Tripoli)	"Independent Civil Society"		27	0.02	0.04	6.03	
Ayman Jamal	Sunni (Dennieh)	"Independent Civil Society"		18	0.01	0.06	4.02	
Abdallah Rifai	Sunni (Minnieh)	"Independent Civil Society"		13	0.01	0.06	2.90	
Samah Arja	Sunni (Dennieh)	"Independent Civil Society"		5	0.00	0.02	1.12	
