= Jihad Al-Samad =

Lebanese politician

Jihad Al-Samad is a Lebanese politician. He serves as a member of the Parliament of Lebanon. He is Sunni. He has chaired committees.

He has been an ally of Hezbollah, and he attended a festival in September 2025 commemorating Hassan Nasrallah and Hashem Safieddine.

== See also ==
- Dignity Movement
