= Azm Movement =

Lebanese political party

Azm Movement تيار العزم
- Abbreviation: TA
- Leader: Najib Mikati
- Founded: 2004
- Headquarters: Tripoli
- Ideology: Secularism
- Political position: Centre
- Parliament of Lebanon: 0 / 128
- Cabinet of Lebanon: 0 / 24

Website
- www.azmtayyar.org/Public

The Azm Movement (Arabic: تيار العزم) is a political party in Lebanon, founded and led by former Prime Minister of Lebanon Najib Miqati. It currently has no members in parliament after the 2022 Lebanese general election.

As of 2018 Haitham Ezzedine served as coordinator of the Azm Movement in Akkar.

== History ==
The Azm Movement participated in the parliamentary elections of 2000 and 2009 by nominating its leader, Najib Mikati, in the Tripoli constituency, for the Sunni seat, and was able to win both times.

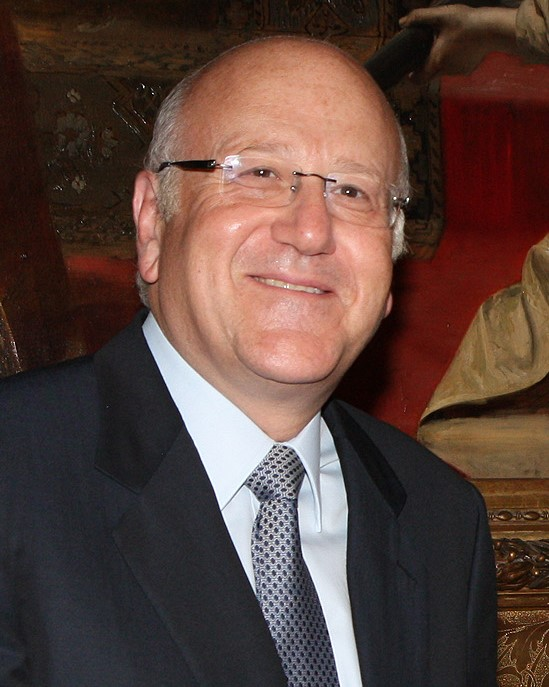
Najib Mikati

The party participated in the 2018 parliamentary elections in the Minnieh, Dinnieh, Tripoli electoral district, which was conducted according to the new proportional system, and announced the formation of a list called "List of Determination", which ranked second in Tripoli with more than 40,000 votes and the party won four seats:

Najib Mikati for the Sunni seat; Ali Darwish for the Alawite seat; Jean Obeid for the Maronite seat and Nicolas Nahas for the Eastern Orthodox seat. Jean Obeid died during his term in 2021.

The Azm Movement did not get any seats in the Lebanese 2022 parliamentary election.
