= Dignity Movement =

Lebanese political party

Dignity Movement تيار الكرامة
- Abbreviation: DM
- Leader: Faisal Karami
- Founder: Omar Karami
- Founded: c. 1970
- Headquarters: Tripoli, Lebanon
- Ideology: Arab nationalism Anti-Zionism; Pan-Arabism
- National affiliation: March 8 Alliance
- Colours: Green
- Parliament of Lebanon: 1 / 128
- Cabinet of Lebanon: 0 / 30

Website
- al-karame.org

The Dignity Movement (Arabic: تيار الكرامة, romanized: Tayyār al-Karāma), formerly known as the Arab Liberation Party (Arabic: حزب التحرر العربي), is a Lebanese political party with considerable support in the city of Tripoli (Trablos), North Lebanon. Its membership is mainly Sunni Muslim.

Once led by former Prime Minister Omar Karami, the party is now led by his son Faisal Karami.

In the 2018 Lebanese general election, Faisal Karami and Jihad Al-Samad were elected as a members of parliament for Tripoli on the "National Dignity" list. Another candidate from the list, Taha Naji, was narrowly defeated by Dima Jamali of the Future Movement, a result that was invalidated by the Constitutional Council. Jamali regained the seat in a by-election in May 2019.

Karami lost his seat in parliament in the original results of the 2022 Lebanese general election, but in September 2022, the results from the North II electoral district were overturned by the Constitutional Council in November 2022 following a recount, and Karami was returned to parliament, replacing Rami Fanj.
