= Ahmad Fatfat =

Lebanese politician

Ahmad Fatfat (Arabic: أحمد فتفت) (born 28 March 1953) is a Lebanese politician from Danniyeh (Sîr ed Dannîyé), North Lebanon. He was the minister of youth and sports in the cabinet of Prime Minister Fouad Siniora. From February to November 2006 he was the interim interior minister. He is seen as being opposed to Syrian involvement in Lebanon.

== Early life and education ==
Born to one of the biggest Sunni Muslim families in Sîr ed Dannîyé, Miniyeh–Danniyeh District, Fatfat holds a degree in medicine.

== Career ==
Fatfat first emerged onto the Lebanese political scene as a candidate for the Lebanese Parliament in the first parliamentary elections in Lebanon after the end of the Lebanese civil war, in 1992. Fatfat failed to reach parliament that year, but succeeded in the next elections in 1996 with backing from Rafic Hariri and his Future Movement. Fatfat was re-elected to office in 2000, breaking into parliament as the highest vote-getter in his district of Dannyieh, North Lebanon. As the Future Movement's candidate he defeated future vice prime minister Issam Fares with a large margin. Fatfat's activism and involvement with Hariri, and his more vocal role during the turbulent period following the assassination of Hariri, catapulted him along with all the March 14 Alliance candidates to a sweep of all of North Lebanon's 28 parliamentary seats.

In June 2005, Fatfat was appointed as the minister of youth and sports to Fouad Siniora's first cabinet. On 5 February 2006, after the resignation of Hassan Sabeh, he became interim interior minister, a position he held until 14 November of the same year when Sabeh reclaimed his office following the assassination of industry minister Pierre Amine Gemayel.

Following the burning of the Danish embassy and of several churches in East Beirut's Christian boroughs in February 2006 (at the time of the Jyllands-Posten Muhammad cartoons controversy), Fatfat accused "radical Shiite elements" and "Christian troublemakers allied with the Syrian regime". He later had to retract this statement when it turned out that all of the anti-Christian rioters arrested on that day by the Lebanese police were radical Sunni Islamists, many of them members of minister Fatfat's own Future Movement.

During the 2006 Israel-Lebanon conflict Minister Fatfat was accused of helping Israel forces in the south, but later the opposition ministers refused to move the accusation to trial which proved that this whole accusation was false." This episode is often ridiculed by Fatfat's political opponents. In the same year, Fatfat caused large controversy over his approval of Hizb ut-Tahrir's right to operate openly in Lebanon and call for the re-establishment of the Islamic Caliphate in the Islamic world.

On 15 June 2007, two Lebanese news anchors from the Lebanese television station NBN owned by Nabih Berri were sacked after being overheard saying that, in the wake of the murder of Walid Eido, Fatfat would "be next." Apparently unaware that their microphones were still on, a female news anchor was heard saying "Ahmed Fatfat will be next. I'm counting them off." When her male colleague tells her not to gloat, she replies "It's not gloating. But we've had enough of them." Clips of the incident have been shown widely on the internet. Ahmad Fatfat has said he fears for his life and plans to sue NBN.

In 2009 elections, Fatfat retained his parliamentary seat and remains member of the Future Movement Bloc and the parliamentary majority.

== Personal life ==
Ahmad Fatftat is married to Rola Nazih Mazloum and has two sons, Ziad and Sami Fatfat.
