= Faisal Karami =

Lebanese politician (born 1971)

- فيصل كرامي

Minister of Youth and Sports
- In office 13 June 2011 – 15 February 2014
- Prime Minister: Najib Mikati
- Preceded by: Ali Abdullah
- Succeeded by: Abdul Muttaleb Al Hinawi

Personal details
- Born: Faisal Omar Karami; 26 September 1971 (age 54) Tripoli, Lebanon
- Party: Arab Liberation Party

Faisal Omar Karami (Arabic: فيصل عمر كرامي; born 26 September 1971) is a Lebanese politician. He served as the minister of youth and sports in the cabinet of Najib Mikati between 2011 and 2014. He is a member of the parliament since 2018.

== Early life and education ==
Karami was born into a Sunni family in Tripoli on 26 September 1971. His father is Omar Karami a former Prime Minister of Lebanon. He is also the nephew of Rashid Karami, who served as prime minister for eight terms. Faisal Karami studied business administration in the United States.

== Career ==
Karami is the head of the Arab Liberation Party. He was appointed minister of youth and sports in June 2011 to the cabinet of Najib Mikati. He was a non-affiliated member and part of the March 8 coalition in the cabinet. Karami's term ended on 15 February 2014, and Abdul Muttaleb Al Hinawi succeeded him in the post.

=== Controversy ===
Karami's appointment led to conflict during the cabinet formation process in 2011 due to the fact that the 8th March Alliance had explicitly asked Mikati to assign Faisal Karami as one of the ministers which was initially refused by Mikati. Mikati argued that if Karami became minister, three of the five seats would be taken by natives of Tripoli (himself, finance minister Mohammad Safadi, and Karami), leading to imbalance in political representation. Nevertheless, Karami was appointed as a non-affiliated minister, and became the seventh Sunni member of the cabinet after Lebanese Parliament Speaker Nabih Berri’s AMAL party agreed to give up one of its governmental shares for him. Karami's appointment was celebrated in his hometown, Tripoli.

=== Attack ===
Karami's convoy was attacked in Tripoli on 18 January 2013, injuring four people. Karami escaped the attack unhurt. Perpetrators were armed radical Sunni Islamists. One of the gunmen was wounded and later arrested.
