= Tripoli District, Lebanon =

Tripoli District
- District
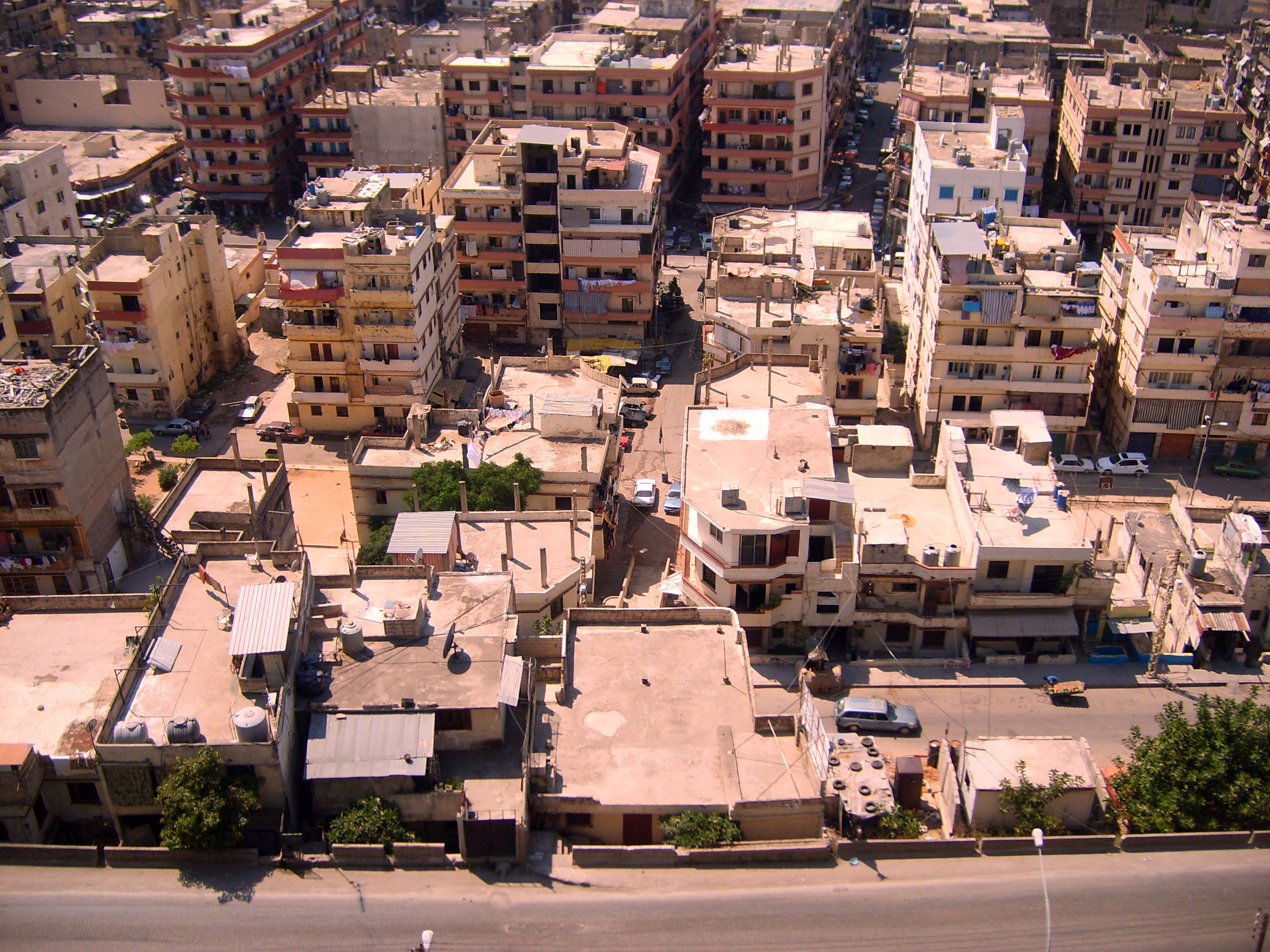
- A neighborhood in east Tripoli

- Location in Lebanon
- Coordinates: 34°26′N 35°51′E
- Country: Lebanon
- Governorate: North Governorate
- Capital: Tripoli

Area
  - Total: 17 sq mi (45 km^{2})

Population
  - Estimate (31 December 2017): 342,760
- Time zone: UTC+2 (EET)
  - Summer (DST): UTC+3 (EEST)

The Tripoli District is a small, but very densely populated district in the North Governorate of Lebanon. It consists of the city Tripoli, its port town El Mina and the surrounding area. The vast majority of residents are Sunni Muslim (approximately 80%), a small minority Orthodox and Maronite Christians, and a small minority of Alawites.

== Municipalities ==
- Al-Qalamoun
- el-Mina
- Tripoli
- Beddawi

== Demographics ==
According to registered voters in 2014:

Year	Christians						Muslims				Druze
Year	Total	Greek Orthodox	Maronites	Armenian Orthodox	Greek Catholics	Other Christians	Total	Sunnis	Alawites	Shias	Druze
2014	10.49%	5.62%	2.45%	0.84%	0.69%	0.89%	89.00%	80.76%	7.01%	1.23%	0.02%
2018	10.48%	5.38%	2.34%	0.78%	0.66%	1.32%	89.52%	81.27%	7.04%	1.21%	0.01%
2022	10.87%	5.91%	2.40%	0.45%	0.43%	1.68%	89.13%	81.06%	6.93%	1.14%	0.00%
2026	9.07%	5.72%	1.57%	0.62%	0.43%	0.73%	91.93%	82.88%	8.67%	0.38%	0.00%

Number of registered voters (21+ years old) over the years.

Years	Men	Women	Total	Growth (%)
2009	101,783	94,366	196,149	—N/a
2010	103,058 ▲	95,484 ▲	198,542 ▲	+1.21% ▲
2011	104,023 ▲	97,088 ▲	201,111 ▲	+1.28% ▲
2012	105,619 ▲	98,842 ▲	204,461 ▲	+1.64% ▲
2013	108,146 ▲	99,911 ▲	208,057 ▲	+1.73% ▲
2014	109,984 ▲	102,111 ▲	212,095 ▲	+1.90% ▲
2015	111,873 ▲	103,951 ▲	215,824 ▲	+1.73% ▼
2016	113,433 ▲	106,755 ▲	220,188 ▲	+1.98% ▲
2017	119,782 ▲	113,158 ▲	232,940 ▲	+5.47% ▲
2018	122,029 ▲	115,301 ▲	237,330 ▲	+1.85% ▼
2019	124,301 ▲	117,235 ▲	241,536 ▲	+1.74% ▼
2020	126,630 ▲	119,730 ▲	246,162 ▲	+1.88% ▲
2021	128,539 ▲	121,534 ▲	250,073 ▲	+1.56% ▼
2022	130,768 ▲	123,670 ▲	254,438 ▲	+1.72% ▲
2023	132,476 ▲	125,161 ▲	257,637 ▲	+1.24% ▼
2024	134,308 ▲	127,089 ▲	261,397 ▲	+1.44% ▲
2025	136,282 ▲	128,839 ▲	265,121 ▲	+1.40% ▼
2026	—N/a	—N/a	269,167 ▲	+1.50% ▲
Source: DGCS
