= Al-Ahbash =

Neo-traditionalist Sufi religious movement

Association of Islamic Charitable Projects جمعية المشاريع الخيرية الإسلامية Jamʿīyah al-Mashārīʿ al-Khayrīyah al-ʾIslāmīyah
- Leader: Shaykh Hussam Qaraqira
- Founded: 1930s (as the Association of Islamic Charitable Projects); 1983 (as Al-Ahbash)
- Headquarters: Various
- Ideology: Pragmatism; Religious pluralism Anti-Salafi
- Religion: Sunni Islam (Ash'ari, Rifaʽi, Sufi)
- National affiliation: March 8 Alliance
- Parliament of Lebanon: 2 / 128

Website
- www.aicp.org (English) projectsassociation.org (Arabic)

Al-Ahbash (Arabic: الأحباش, romanized: al-ʾAḥbāsh, lit. 'the Ethiopians'), also known as the Association of Islamic Charitable Projects (Arabic: جمعية المشاريع الخيرية الإسلامية, Jamʿīyah al-Mashārīʿ al-Khayrīyah al-ʾIslāmīyah, AICP) is a Sufi religious movement and, in Lebanon, political party, which was founded in the mid-1980s. The group follow the teachings of Ethiopian scholar Abdullah al-Harari. Due to the group's origins and activity in Lebanon, the Ahbash have been described as the "activist expression of Lebanese Sufism."

The Ahbash have been noted for their ardent criticism of conservative strains of Islam, including the Salafi movement and Wahhabism. The movement has been described by some scholars as incorporating elements of Shia and Sunni theology within a framework of Sufi spiritualism. It has also been described as one of the "most controversial Muslim associations" among modern Islamic groups. Within Sunni Islam, opponents of the Ahbash have frequently referred to the movement as unorthodox and deviant.

== History ==
Calligraphic logo of al-Ahbash

Emblem used by the North American branch

The AICP was founded in the 1930s by Ahmad al-Ajuz and arrived in Lebanon in the 1950s, where "they blended Sunni and Shia theology with Sufi spiritualism into a doctrinal eclecticism that preached nonviolence and political quietism." The AICP remained without a leader until the 1980s when Abdullah al-Harari became the nominal head of the organization and was taken over by Al-Ahbash in 1983.

Al-Ahbash was founded in the suburb of Bourj Abu Haidar, in West Beirut, as a small philanthropic and spiritualist movement among the Sunni lower classes. From there they spread throughout Lebanon to Tripoli, Akkar and Iqlim al-Kharrub in the Chouf, where they founded educational and religious institutions. Beginning in the 1990s, Ahbash propelled from a minority group to the largest Sunni religious organization in Lebanon, mainly due to Syrian government backing—having close links to Syrian intelligence. The Syrians supported and promoted the Ahbash in order to limit the influence of radical and fundamentalist Sunni movements in Lebanon. Their growth was also aided by the forcible seizure and control of many prominent mosques in West Beirut in the early 1980s, despite the protests of Dar al-Fatwa (the official body for Lebanon's Sunni Muslims). At the end of the 1990s there were close to 250,000 Ahbash members worldwide, according to a high-ranking Ahbash activist.

Several public figures became Ahbash members when it emerged in France beginning in 1991, such as rapper Kery James or Abd Samad Moussaoui.

On 31 August 1995, members of a Salafi jihadi group called "Osbat al-Ansar" killed the leader of Al-Ahbash, Sheikh Nizar Halabi, who was reportedly being groomed by the Syrians to become Lebanon's Grand Mufti. His murder led to a heavy-handed Syrian response—concluding with the public execution of his assassins in 1997.

It has been compared to the Turkish Gülen movement.

== Religious beliefs ==
Al-Ahbash beliefs are an interpretation of Islam combining elements of Sunni Shia Islam with Sufi spiritualism. Al-Ahbash follows the Shafi'i school of fiqh (jurisprudence) and its theological school is Ash'arism, and the Rifaʽi order is the source of their Sufi practices. The group rejects Salafi figures such as Ibn Taymiyya, Muhammad ibn Abd al-Wahhab and Sayyid Qutb. It advocates pluralism, and opposition to political activism; its slogan is "the resounding voice of moderation". It also promotes its beliefs internationally through a significant internet presence and regional offices, notably in the United States.

In Canada and the United States, al-Ahbash followers pray using a southeastern qibla, in contrast to most Muslims in the region, who face the northeast in their mosques.

== Doctrinal aspects ==
=== Syncreticism ===
Shaykh Habashi's syncretic teachings draw upon different branches of Islamic theology, and thereby elude unambiguous classification. In an address to his followers, Habashi stated, "[w]e are Ash'aris and Shafi'is. The Ash'ariyya is the basis of our belief, and the Shfi'iyya is our daily code." According to Thomas Pierret, Ahbash's ideology "can be termed 'neo-traditionalist', in that it aims to preserve the Islamic heritage of the Ottoman era, which they consider themselves to be the inheritors."

Shaykh Habashi in his books and lectures blends elements of Sunni and Shi'i theological doctrines with Sufi spiritualism by supporting the legitimacy of Ali and his descendants while condemning Mu'awiyya, the caliph and governor of Damascus, and his son Yazid, as "seditious" thus adopting the Shi'a tradition. Although not explicitly stated, Sufism plays also an important role in al-Ahbash's doctrine as demonstrated by the practice of several Sufi traditions such as the ziyarat (pilgrimage), mystical dancing sessions, use of musical bands in religious ceremonies, and the support of three tariqas. The contention that it is a primarily Sufi movement, however, has been disputed.

=== Moderation ===
Mustafa Kabla and Haggai Erlich identify "moderation" (wasatiyyah) as the key word in al-Ahbash's "necessary science of religion" and instance the group's twelve-goal platform whose second item calls for "[p]reaching moderation [...] and good behavior as ways of implementing religious principles, while combating extremism and zeal." This position is also reflected in the groups's decided opposition to the Salafist movement and Islamist thinkers, namely Sayyid Qutb, Muhammed ibn 'Abd-al-Wahhab, and Ibn Taymiyyah.

=== Rejection of anthropomorphism ===
One further critical cleavage is al-Ahbash's strict rejection of any form of anthropomorphism of God of which they accuse Wahhabis. Consequently, Shaykh Habashi holds that "it does not befit God to speak like that, and his word is not a voice or letters" and that therefore, the Qur'an contains the word of God but could be written only after "Gabriel listened to His word, understood it, and passed it on to the prophets and the angels." This is a highly controversial point of view within Islam which is not fully compatible with the consensus of Sunnis, and Wahhabis accuse Ahbash of doubt regarding the origin of the Qur'an. Another famous example regards the interpretations of the Qur'anic sentence describing God seated on his throne after creating the world. According to Wahhabi texts, this means that he literally sat on his throne; however, according to Shaykh Habashi, copying the Mu'tazila school of thought, it meant that he took control of the world.

=== Separation of religion and state ===
The arguably most important split, however, is the question of the relation between religion, politics, and the state. Departing from most Islamic writings on this topic, al-Ahbash advocates a separation of religion and state and thereby rejects the idea of an Islamic state. Al-Fakhani, an AICP representative said "Most of our states are Islamic and Muslims wish the presence of an Islamic state, but the regional and international conditions do not allow it." Consequently, the group repeatedly emphasized the need for Muslim-Christian co-existence and tolerance towards other religious groups in Lebanon.

=== Takfir ===
The tolerant stance in Al-Ahbash's public rhetoric is doubted by some Muslim groups, orthodox Sunni in particular. They accuse the group of an excessive use of Takfir – the act of declaring another Muslim an unbeliever – and thereby of the provocation of inner-Islamic tensions. Al-Ahbash has mainly used takfir against Wahhabi and Salafi leaders. According to Tariq Ramadan, Al-Ahbash "adherents carry on a permanent double discourse: to Western questioners, they claim to support the emancipation of women and laicism to oppose the "fundamentalists" (all the issues they know are sensitive and useful for getting them recognized). However, within Muslim communities, they carry on an extremely intransigent and closed discourse, usually treating most of the principal Muslim ulama as kuffar (by which they mean "unbelievers," "impious people"). They base their teachings on interpretations recognized as deviant by all other schools of thought and all other scholars of note (for example, their singular understanding of the meaning of the names of God, or their assertion that the Qur'anic Text was interpreted by the angel Gabriel, or the practice of praying to the dead). Their approach on very specific points of doctrine (such as those we have referred to) is hostile and usually violent."

== Political positions ==
As a political party, when al-Ahbash ran for the 1992 Lebanese parliamentary elections, this constituency enabled its candidate, Adnan Trabulsi, to win a seat in a Beirut district after the Ahbash and Hezbollah concluded an undeclared alliance in Beirut that assured the election of their respective candidates. However, Trabulsi lost in the subsequent 1996 elections. In 2018, Trabulsi was again elected to serve on the Lebanese Parliament.

The Ahbash are also allied to the Amal Movement, a Shia party, and Mustaqbal.

== Controversy ==
The group are seen as being controversial within Islam for its anti-Salafi religious stance and also, as their Sufi and other beliefs are seen as heretical. As a result, they are commonly described by Wahhabis as combining "Sufi polytheism, shirk, with Shi'i covert anti-Sunna tactics". According to Samuel Bar in Warrant for Terror: The Fatwas of Radical Islam and the Duty to Jihad, the Wahhabis have described the Ahbash as being outside of Ahl al-Sunnah and have argued that their fatwas should not be considered. Some of these fatwas have drawn significant controversy, including rulings that permit transactions involving interest with non-Muslims, the permissibility of intermingling between genders, and allowing prayer in a state of impurity under certain circumstances. Critics argue that such rulings deviate from the consensus of Ahl al-Sunnah wal-Jama'ah.

They are also viewed by other Muslims groups as being favoured by the governments of the United States, Europe, Ethiopia, and Australia, who "do indeed welcome the Ahbash activities among their Muslim citizens." They have been described as a sect by various commentators, while others see them as a valid religious movement. The AICP runs a network of Islamic schools in affiliation with Al-Azhar according to Kabha and Erlich although a range of scholars from the latter institution, including previous Presidents and Ali Gomaa, the former Grand Mufti of Egypt, have described the Al-Ahbash movement as deviant and unorthodox in their edicts or Fatwas (an official statement or order from an Islamic religious leader), and members of the movement were arrested "attempting to spread their beliefs on the campuses of Al-Azhar University" under the Egyptian penal code.

=== Australia ===
In 2011, the Australian National Imams Council accused the Muslim Community Radio Incorporated as being associated with Al-Ahbash, which they described as a fringe cult organisation and violent, and made public announcement for government officials not to renew its broadcasting license. However, the Australian Communications and Media Authority granted a 5-year license in 2011, which drew criticism from Islamic groups. In 2006, the Imam of Lakemba Mosque in Sydney, Taj El-Din Hilaly, threatened to back out of the Howard government's, Muslim Community Reference Group because of the inclusion of Dr. Mustapha Kara-Ali, who was affiliated with Al-Ahbash.

=== Egypt ===
In 2003, Ali Gomaa, the former Grand Mufti of Egypt, issued a fatwa describing the Ahbash as "deviant" that sought to "corrupt the Muslim creed and incite sedition amongst the Muslim Ummah. Moreover, they are paid agents to the enemies of Islam." In 2007, Egypt also arrested 22 men for seeking to spread the Ahbash faith in the country.

=== Ethiopia ===
In 2012, Muslim protesters in Addis Ababa accused the Ethiopian government of Meles Zenawi of promoting Al-Ahbash among the Muslim population of the country.

=== Jordan ===
During the 1990s fighting broke out between the Muslim Brotherhood and Al-Ahbash in what became known as the "war of the mosques". The fighting was started due to the brotherhood believing that Jordan's Ministry of Religious Endowments were giving precedence to Al-Ahbash members being allowed to teach in mosques from which they themselves were banned.

=== Lebanon ===
Due to its strong historical links with the Syrian government of the al-Assad family, the Ahbash have often been in conflict with the Lebanese supporters of the anti-Syrian Hariri family and in 2005 at least two of its members were initially implicated—jailed and later released—in the Assassination of Rafic Hariri. The Ahbash also strongly opposed and demonstrated against the Cedar Revolution that was triggered by Hariri's assassination. Ahbash reportedly remains neutral in the Syrian Civil War, despite pressure from both sides.

In 2010, Ahbash and Hezbollah members were involved in a street battle which was perceived to be over parking issues. Both groups later met to form a joint compensation fund for the victims of the conflict. However, despite this instance of violence, the Ahbash have "normal" and "friendly" relations with Hezbollah. The Ahbash have also engaged in bloody clashes in Sidon and Tripoli, in the 1990s, against the rival Sunni Al-Jama'ah Al-Islamiyah.

=== Saudi Arabia ===
Former grand mufti of Saudi Arabia Ibn Baz declared Ahbash a "deviant faction".

=== Ukraine ===
Roman Silantiev states that the mufti of Ukraine, Ahmad Tamim, a Lebanese citizen, has been accused of belonging to the "sinister sect" of Ahbash by his opponents, however, his opponents find it difficult to define the heresy of Ahbash. Ahmad Tamim's opponent mufti Said Ismaigilov allegedly has links to groups affiliated with the Muslim Brotherhood.

== See also ==
- Barelvi
- Nahdlatul Ulama
- Politics of Lebanon
- Sufi–Salafi relations
