= 2018 Lebanese general election in Mount Lebanon I =

- 6 May 2018

8 seats to the Parliament of Lebanon
- Turnout: 65.39%
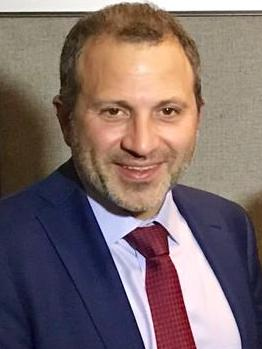

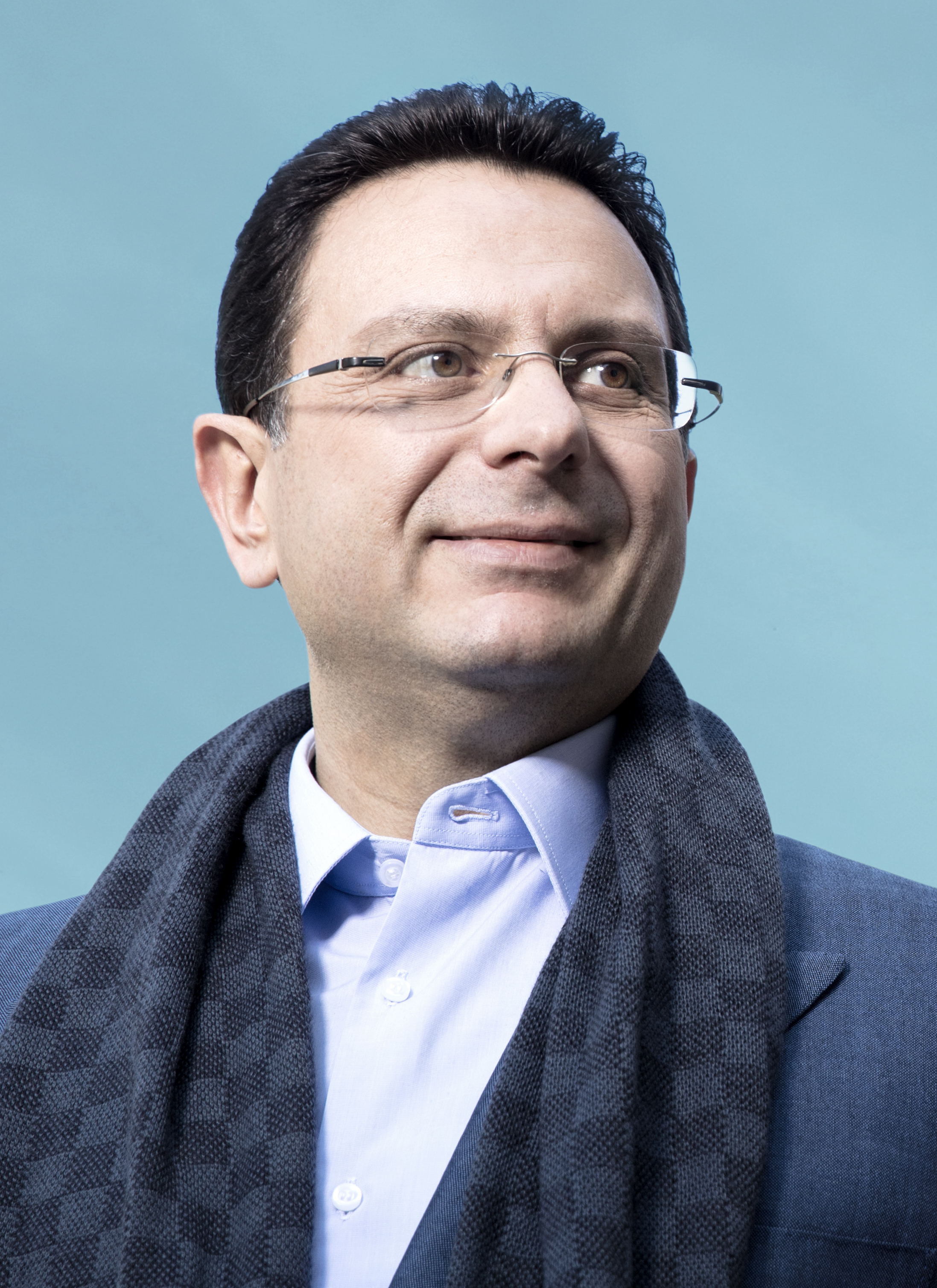
	First party	Second party	Third party
Leader	Gebran Bassil	Samir Geagea	Farid Khazen
Party	Strong Lebanon	Lebanese Forces	Khazen Bloc
Alliance	Parties: FPM; Chamel Roukoz; Neemat Frem; Independents
Leader's seat	Batroun	Did not stand	Keserwan
Seats won	4	2	2
Popular vote	34,539	24,456	18,553
Percentage	29.87%	21.16%	16.05%

Voting to elect eight members of the Lebanese parliament took place in the Mount Lebanon I district (one of four electoral districts in the Mount Lebanon region) on 6 May 2018, part of the general election of that year. The constituency had 176,818 registered voters, out of whom 115,619 voted.

== Demographics ==
The electorate is predominantly Christian; Maronites make up 75.4% of the electorate, 10.4% Shia, 4.1% Greek Orthodox, 3.6% Greek Catholic, 1.9% Sunni and 4% other Christian communities.

== Voting ==
In Byblos-Kesrwan electoral district 5 lists were registered. The lists in the fray are the "Strong Lebanon" (supported by Free Patriotic Movement), the "National Solidarity" (Hezbollah), the "Anna al-Qarar" list (alliance between Kataeb Party, Fares Souhaid, Farid Heikal Khazen and independents, supported by Marada Movement, the "Clear Change" list (supported by Lebanese Forces) and the "Kulluna Watani" (We are all National) list.

In difference with previous elections, FPM and Hezbollah did not join forces on a common list. Hezbollah fielded its own list, with a Shia candidate (Hussein Zuaitar) from Baalbek. The Alliance National list included the former Telecommunications Minister Jean Louis Cardahi and dissident FPM politician Bassam Hachem, Hezbollah candidate and 4 other independents.

The FPM list was led by General Chamel Roukoz, with World Maronite Foundation president Neemat Frem, former minister Ziad Baroud and former parliamentarian Mansour al-Bon, amongst others.

The Kataeb-Souhaid supported list sought to include personalities from civil society. It included former National Bloc general secretary Jean Hawat. There was resistance from Kataeb side to field incumbent parliamentarians Youssef Khalil and Gilberte Zouein, since they were linked to the Change and Reform Bloc.

The "Kulluna Watani" (We are all National) list included former minister Youssef Salame.

=== Candidates ===
List	Maronite (Byblos, 2 seats)		Shia (Byblos, 1 seat)	Maronite (Kesrwan, 5 seats)				
"Strong Lebanon"	Simon Abi Ramia; 9,729 (8.41%)(FPM)	Walid Khoury	Rabih Awad	Chamel Roukoz; 7,300 (6.31%)	Neemat Frem; 10,717 (9.27%)	Roger Azar; 6,793 (5.88%) (FPM)	Ziad Baroud	Mansour al-Bon
"National Solidarity"	Jean-Louis Cardahi	Bassam Hachem	Hussein Zuaitar (Hezbollah)	Carlos Abu Nader	Zeina Kallab	Michel Keyrouz	Joseph Zayek	Joseph Zougheib
"Anna al-Qarar"	Fares Souhaid	Jean Hawat	Moustapha Husseini; 256 (0.22%)	Farid Heikal Al Khazen; 9,081 (7.85%)	Shaker Salameh (Kataeb)	Youssef Khalil	Gilberte Zouein	Yolanda Khoury
"Clear Change	Ziad Hawat; 14,424 (12.48%)(Lebanese Forces)	Fady Rouhana Sakr	Mahmoud Awad	Chawki Daccache; 10,032 (8.68%) (Lebanese Forces)	Rock Mehanna	Patricia Elias	Numan Murad	Ziad Khalifa (NLP)
"Kulluna Watani" (We are all National)	Nadim Souhaid	Rania Bassil (Sabaa)	Mohamed Mekdad (LCP)	Youssef Salame (Idendity and Sovereignty Gathering)	Dori Daou (Sabaa)	Josephine Zogheib (MMFD)		
ACE Project, Ministry of Interior and Municipalities

== Result by candidate ==
Name	Sect	List	Party	Votes	% of electoral district	% of preferential votes for sect seat	% of list	Elected?
Ziad Hawat	Maronite (Byblos)	"Clear Change"	Lebanese Forces	14,424	12.48	35.54	53.46	Yes
Neemat Frem	Maronite (Kesrwan)	"Strong Lebanon"	FPM	10,717	9.27	17.64	19.65	Yes
Chawki Daccache	Maronite (Kesrwan)	"Clear Change"	Lebanese Forces	10,032	8.68	16.51	37.18	Yes
Simon Abi Rumia	Maronite (Byblos)	"Strong Lebanon"	FPM	9,729	8.41	23.97	17.84	Yes
Hussein Zuaitar	Shia (Byblos)	"National Solidarity"	Hezbollah	9,369	8.10	81.12	74.65	
Farid Heikal Al Khazen	Maronite (Kesrwan)	"Anna al-Qarar"	Khazen Bloc	9,081	7.85	14.95	48.95	Yes
Walid Khoury	Maronite (Byblos)	"Strong Lebanon"		7,782	6.73	19.18	14.27	
Chamel Roukoz	Maronite (Kesrwan)	"Strong Lebanon"		7,300	6.31	12.01	13.38	Yes
Roger Azar	Maronite (Kesrwan)	"Strong Lebanon"	FPM	6,793	5.88	11.18	12.45	Yes
Mansour al Bon	Maronite (Kesrwan)	"Strong Lebanon"		6,589	5.70	10.84	12.08	
Fares Souhaid	Maronite (Byblos)	"Anna al-Qarar"		5,617	4.86	13.84	30.28	
Ziad Baroud	Maronite (Kesrwan)	"Strong Lebanon"		3,893	3.37	6.41	7.14	
Shaker Salameh	Maronite (Kesrwan)	"Anna al-Qarar"	Kataeb	2,239	1.94	3.69	12.07	
Jean-Louis Cardahi	Maronite (Byblos)	"National Solidarity"		1,209	1.05	2.98	9.63	
Rabih Awad	Shia (Byblos)	"Strong Lebanon"		891	0.77	7.71	1.63	
Mahmoud Awad	Shia (Byblos)	"Clear Change"		787	0.68	6.81	2.92	
Josephine Zogheib	Maronite (Kesrwan)	"Kulluna Watani"		728	0.63	1.20	28.82	
Nadim Souhaid	Maronite (Byblos)	"Kulluna Watani"		590	0.51	1.45	23.36	
Gilberte Zouein	Maronite (Kesrwan)	"Anna al-Qarar"		521	0.45	0.86	2.81	
Fadi Rouhana Sakr	Maronite (Byblos)	"Clear Change"		481	0.42	1.19	1.78	
Carlos Abu Nader	Maronite (Kesrwan)	"National Solidarity"		470	0.41	0.77	3.74	
Youssef Salame	Maronite (Kesrwan)	"Kulluna Watani"		327	0.28	0.54	12.95	
Rania Bassil	Maronite (Byblos)	"Kulluna Watani"		323	0.28	0.80	12.79	
Zeina Kallab	Maronite (Kesrwan)	"National Solidarity"		308	0.27	0.51	2.45	
Numan Murad	Maronite (Kesrwan)	"Clear Change"		274	0.24	0.45	1.02	
Joseph Zayek	Maronite (Kesrwan)	"National Solidarity"		263	0.23	0.43	2.10	
Rock Mehanna	Maronite (Kesrwan)	"Clear Change"		259	0.22	0.43	0.96	
Moustapha Husseini	Shia (Byblos)	"Anna al-Qarar"	Khazen Bloc	256	0.22	2.22	1.38	Yes
Mohamed Mekdad	Shia (Byblos)	"Kulluna Watani"	LCP	247	0.21	2.14	9.78	
Jean Hawat	Maronite (Byblos)	"Anna al-Qarar"		229	0.20	0.56	1.23	
Michel Keyrouz	Maronite (Kesrwan)	"National Solidarity"		222	0.19	0.37	1.77	
Bassam Hachem	Maronite (Byblos)	"National Solidarity"		199	0.17	0.49	1.59	
Patricia Elias	Maronite (Kesrwan)	"Clear Change"		183	0.16	0.30	0.68	
Youssef Khalil	Maronite (Kesrwan)	"Anna al-Qarar"		171	0.15	0.28	0.92	
Ziad Khalifa	Maronite (Kesrwan)	"Clear Change"	NLP	134	0.12	0.22	0.50	
Douri Dou	Maronite (Kesrwan)	"Kulluna Watani"		112	0.10	0.18	4.43	
Yolanda Khoury	Maronite (Kesrwan)	"Anna al-Qarar"		78	0.07	0.13	0.42	
Joseph Zougheib	Maronite (Kesrwan)	"National Solidarity"		64	0.06	0.11	0.51	
