= Independent Consultative Gathering =

Parliamentary bloc in the Lebanese parliament

The Independent Consultative Gathering or Independent Parliamentary Consultative Gathering is a parliamentary bloc in the Lebanese parliament formed in 2024 by four former members of the Free Patriotic Movement's Strong Lebanon bloc—Elias Bou Saab, Alain Aoun, Ibrahim Kanaan, and Simon Abi Ramia.

== Background ==
Since Gebran Bassil became leader of the Free Patriotic Movement in 2015, the party has seen a number of resignations and expulsions of senior members. In 2022 the party expelled MPs Mario Aoun and Ziad Aswad over disputes amidst the parliamentary elections. In March 2024, Deputy Speaker of Parliament Elias Bou Saab, an independent member of the FPM's parliamentary bloc, was expelled from the bloc over disputes relating to the parliamentary elections and the 2022–2025 Lebanese presidential election. In August 2024, the FPM expelled MP Alain Aoun, the nephew of party founder Michel Aoun, and that same month Ibrahim Kanaan and Simon Abi Ramia announced their resignations from the party, citing disagreement's with Bassil's leadership style. The four MPs went on to form the Independent Consultative Gathering bloc.

In the January 2025 parliamentary consultations, the bloc, except for Elias Bou Saab, nominated Nawaf Salam for Prime Minister.

Aoun, Kanaan, and Abi Ramia all backed local lists in their regions against the FPM in the 2025 municipal elections.

== 2022–2026 session deputies ==
Name	Election Area	Political Affiliation	Sect
Elias Bou Saab	Matn	Independent	Greek Orthodox
Ibrahim Kanaan	Matn	Independent	Maronite
Alain Aoun	Baabda	Independent	Maronite
Simon Abi Ramia	Jbeil	Independent	Maronite
