= Strong Lebanon =

Lebanese political bloc

Strong Lebanon تكتل لبنان القوي
- Legislature(s): Parliament of Lebanon
- Foundation: 8 May 2018
- Previous name(s): Change and Reform bloc
- Member parties: Free Patriotic Movement; Tashnaq
- President: Gebran Bassil
- Constituency: North Lebanon: North I; North III; Mount Lebanon: Mount Lebanon I; Mount Lebanon II; Mount Lebanon III; Mount Lebanon IV; Beirut: Beirut I; Beirut II; Bekaa: Bekaa I; Bekaa II; Bekaa III
- Representation: 13 / 128 (10%)
- Ideology: Christian democracy Civic nationalism
- Political position: Government

Strong Lebanon (Arabic: تكتل لبنان القوي) is the parliamentary bloc of the Free Patriotic Movement and their allies in the Lebanese Parliament. Headed by Gebran Bassil, it consisted of 29 deputies after the 2018 general election and shrunk to 17 deputies after the 2022 Lebanese general election.

== Election summary ==
Election	Seats	Change
2018	29 / 128 (23%)	New
2022	17 / 128 (13%)	▼12

== 2018–2022 session deputies ==
Name	Election Area	Political Affiliation	Sect
Nicolas Sehnaoui	Beirut I	FPM	Greek Catholic
Antoine Pano	Beirut I	FPM	Minorities
Edgard Traboulsi	Beirut II	FPM	Evangelical
Assaad Dergham	Akkar	FPM	Greek Orthodox
Gebran Bassil	Batroun	FPM	Maronite
Georges Atallah	Koura	FPM	Greek Orthodox
Simon Abi Ramia	Byblos	FPM	Maronite
Roger Azar	Keserwan	FPM	Maronite
Ibrahim Kanaan	Metn	FPM	Maronite
Edy Maalouf	Metn	FPM	Greek Catholic
Alain Aoun	Baabda	FPM	Maronite
~~Hikmat Dib~~ Resigned from FPM on 1 March 2022	Baabda	FPM	Maronite
Cesar Abi Khalil	Aley	FPM	Maronite
Mario Aoun	Chouf	FPM	Maronite
Farid Boustany	Chouf	FPM	Maronite
Salim Aoun	Zahle	FPM	Maronite
Ziad Assouad	Jezzine	FPM	Maronite
Salim Khoury	Jezzine	FPM	Greek Catholic
Elias Bou Saab	Metn	Independent	Greek Orthodox
Hagop Pakradounian	Metn	Tashnaq	Armenian Orthodox
Hagop Terzian	Beirut I	Tashnaq	Armenian Orthodox
Alexander Matousian	Beirut I	Tashnaq	Armenian Orthodox
Talal Arslan	Aley	LDP	Druze
~~Michel Moawad~~ Withdrew in October 2019	Zgharta	IM	Maronite
~~Michel Daher~~ Withdrew in August 2020	Zahle	Independent	Greek Catholic
~~Neemat Frem~~ Withdrew in October 2019	Keserwan	Independent	Maronite
~~Chamel Roukoz~~ Withdrew in October 2019	Keserwan	Independent	Maronite
~~Elie Ferzli~~ Expelled in April 2021	West Bekaa	Independent	Greek Orthodox
Moustafa Hussein	Akkar	Independent	Alawite

=== Timeline ===
17 out of 29 MP from the bloc voted for Nabih Berri in the 2018 Speaker of the Lebanese Parliament election.

Elie Ferzli was elected as Deputy Speaker of the Parliament of Lebanon.

At the beginning of the 17 October Revolution, Neemat Frem, Chamel Roukoz and Michel Moawad left the bloc.

After the 2020 Beirut explosion, Michel Daher left the bloc.

In April 2021, Elie Ferzli left the bloc.

On 1 March 2022, MP Hikmat Dib resigned from FPM causing the bloc to shrink to 23 MP.

== 2022–2026 session deputies ==
Name	Election Area	Political Affiliation	Sect
Nicolas Sehnaoui	Beirut I	FPM	Greek Catholic
Edgard Traboulsi	Beirut II	FPM	Evangelical
Jimmy Jabbour	Akkar	FPM	Maronite
Assaad Dergham	Akkar	FPM	Greek Orthodox
Gebran Bassil	Batroun	FPM	Maronite
Georges Atallah	Koura	FPM	Greek Orthodox
~~Simon Abi Ramia~~ Resigned from FPM on 7 August 2024	~~Byblos~~	~~FPM~~	~~Maronite~~
Nada Boustani Khoury	Keserwan	FPM	Maronite
~~Ibrahim Kanaan~~ Resigned from FPM on 28 August 2024	Metn	FPM	Maronite
~~Alain Aoun~~ Expelled from FPM on 2 August 2024	~~Baabda~~	~~FPM~~	~~Maronite~~
Cesar Abi Khalil	Aley	FPM	Maronite
Ghassan Atallah	Chouf	FPM	Greek Catholic
Farid Boustany	Chouf	FPM	Maronite
Salim Aoun	Zahle	FPM	Maronite
Charbel Maroun	West Bekaa	FPM	Maronite
Samer Al Toum	Baalback	FPM	Greek Catholic
~~Elias Bou Saab~~ Expelled in April 2024	~~Metn~~	~~Independent~~	~~Greek Orthodox~~
~~Hagop Pakradounian~~	~~Metn~~	~~Tashnaq~~	~~Armenian Orthodox~~
~~Hagop Terzian~~	~~Beirut I~~	~~Tashnaq~~	~~Armenian Orthodox~~
~~George Bouchikian~~ Expelled on 6 December 2022	~~Zahle~~	~~Tashnaq~~	~~Armenian Orthodox~~
~~Mohamad Yehya~~	~~Akkar~~	~~Independent~~	~~Sunni~~

=== Timeline ===
4 out of 21 MP from the bloc voted for Nabih Berri in the 2022 Speaker of the Lebanese Parliament election.

Elias Bou Saab was elected as Deputy Speaker of the Parliament of Lebanon.

On 23 June 2022, Tashnaq and Yehya named Najib Mikati as prime minister unlike the rest of the bloc.

On 10 September 2022, Gebran Bassil kicked out ex-MP Ziad Assouad and ex-MP Mario Aoun.

On 14 September 2022, FPM boycotted the parliament session due to Bachir Gemayel assassination memorial. On 13 October 2022, FPM boycotted the presidential election session due to 13 October memorial.

On 10 November 2022, Hagop Pakradounian criticized his colleague in the bloc Jimmy Jabbour for participating in a memorial to the martyrs of the Republic of Azerbaijan in Akkar.

On 6 December 2022, Tashnaq kicked out MP Bouchikian which shrunk the Strong Lebanon bloc to 20. Elias Bou Saab was reportedly kicked out of the Free Patriotic Movement bloc in April 2024 in which FPM sources cited political disagreements since the beginning of the 2022 parliament. Disagreements mostly include choice of presidential candidates and ideological differences.

In August 2024, Alain Aoun was expelled from FPM for his lack of alignments with the parliamentary bloc, like refusing to vote for Jihad Azour in the 2022–2025 Lebanese presidential election. On 7 August 2024, Simon Abi Ramia resigned from the Free Patriotic Movement citing "individualism" within the party and disagreements with its leader Gebran Bassil. Ibrahim Kanaan resigned from the Free Patriotic Movement on August 14, 2024

== See also ==
- List of members of the 2018–2022 Lebanese Parliament
- List of members of the 2022–2026 Lebanese Parliament
