= Ibrahim Kanaan =

Lebanese politician

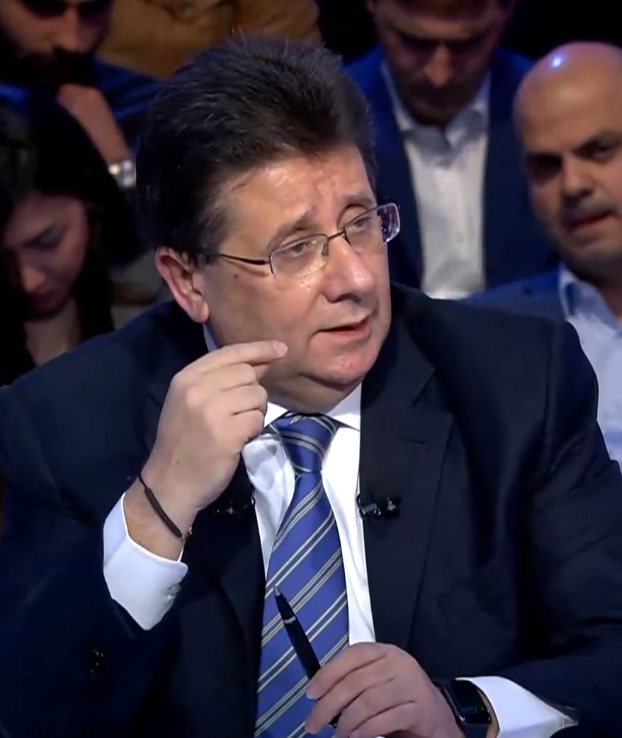
Ibrahim Kanaan guest of MTV Lebanon, 7 February 2020.

Ibrahim Youssef Kanaan (Arabic: إبراهيم كنعان, born in 1962) is a Lebanese Maronite lawyer, politician and former member of parliament of the Strong Lebanon bloc and the Free Patriotic Movement.

== Personal life ==
Born on November 11, 1962, into a Maronite family, he has three brothers and two sisters. He is married to Tania Saadé, and has two daughters, Maria and Rita.

== Education ==
He went to Champville and Mont-La Salle schools, then studied law in the USJ university, followed by a master's degree in International Private Law from Paris 2 in 1987, and another Master's in French Law, and is member of the Bar since 1989.

== Career and politics ==
His political activism started since the beginning of Michel Aoun's political journey, even before the creation of the Free Patriotic Movement (FPM), when he used to meet Aoun at the Baabda Palace, as a young lawyer, and started lobbying for the ideas of freedom from the Syrian occupation in Lebanon and also with outside organizations from France, Geneva and UK. He left the country a few weeks before the 13 of Oct 1990 Syrian invasion of the Baabda Palace took place, as those who spoke against the Syrians were prosecuted, so stayed in London where he got an offer from a law firm and then he started to lobby for Lebanon from within the Lebanese community in London. He started working at Elliott and Company as a Middle East consultant, then joined Kennedys Solicitors where he worked as an international partner. He then formed an organization called the British Lebanese Civil Liberties Association in which there were a number of British MPs as well as Lebanese expatriates. Then he formed the Liberation Front of Lebanon, and in 1996 in Paris the Free Patriotic Movement started. He was elected as secretary general of the British Middle East Law Council at the Law Society of England and Wales.

In 1992, he founded the law firm Kanaan Law Firm, based in Beirut, which is specialized in commercial and corporate affairs, and in 2004, he participated in the establishment of the Kennedys and Co Office in Riyadh.

In 2005, before the return of Michel Aoun from exile, he was announced candidate by General Aoun in Paris, and got elected on June 12, 2005, by 57,000 votes in the Metn district.

He became the secretary general of the FPM's Change and Reform Bloc, head of the Youth and Sports parliamentary committee, and a member of the highest parliamentary court and an active member of the Justice and Administration Committee as well as a member of the Parliamentary Human Rights Committee.

On June 7, 2009, he was re-elected MP for the constituency the third consecutive time in Metn, on the list of the Change and Reform Bloc, obtaining the greatest number of votes and became head of the parliamentary Budget and Financial Affairs Commission.

In August 2024, Kanaan resigned from the Free Patriotic Movement (FPM), citing internal disagreements and a lack of response to his calls for unity within the party. Despite his departure, he remains committed to his constituents and continues to advocate for reform and national unity.

In April 2025, Kanaan met with President Joseph Aoun to discuss his recent trip to Washington, where he engaged with the International Monetary Fund and World Bank. He emphasized the need for Lebanon to adopt a clear, reformative vision to address its economic challenges.

On May 5, 2025 "It's Time" list, headed by Auguste Bacchus, and supported by him and the Lebanese Forces and the Phalange, won in Jdeideh El-Bouchrieh (North Metn) the Municipal Elections.

== See also ==
- Free Patriotic Movement
- Michel Aoun
- Gebran Bassil
- Alain Aoun
- Mario Aoun
- Elias Bou Saab
- Issam Abu Jamra
- Charbel Nahas
