= Hikmat Dib =

Lebanese Maronite politician

Hikmat Dib (Arabic: حكمت ديب) is a Lebanese Maronite politician of the Free Patriotic Movement. He graduated from the Faculty of Engineering at Saint Joseph University. He was elected to a parliament in the 2009 Lebanese general election and in the 2018 Lebanese general election. He resigned from FPM on 1 March 2022, two months prior to the 2022 Lebanese general election.

== See also ==
- Michel Aoun
- Gebran Bassil
- Ibrahim Kanaan
- Alain Aoun
- Mario Aoun
- Elias Bou Saab
- Issam Abu Jamra
- Charbel Nahas
