= Free Patriotic Movement =

Lebanese Christian political party

Free Patriotic Movement التيار الوطني الحر
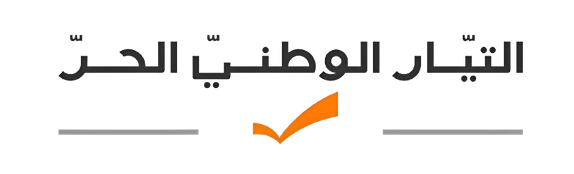
- Abbreviation: FPM
- Secretary-General: Jihad Salameh
- Founded: 14 July 1994 (32 years, 59 days)
- Headquarters: Mirna Chalouhy Center, Sin el Fil, Lebanon
- Ideology: Christian democracy Lebanese nationalism Civic nationalism
- Political position: Right-wing; Historical: Centre to centre-left
- Religion: Maronite Catholicism
- International affiliation: For the Freedom of Nations!
- Colors: Orange
- Parliamentary bloc: Strong Lebanon
- Parliament: 13 / 128
- Council of Ministers: 0 / 24

Party flag

Website
- www.tayyar.org

The Free Patriotic Movement (Arabic: التيار الوطني الحر, at-Tayyār al-Waṭanī al-Horr) is a Lebanese political party. Founded by Michel Aoun in 1994, the party is currently led by Aoun's son-in-law Gebran Bassil since 2015.

== History ==
=== Background ===
While Michel Aoun was exiled in Paris for many years, on 14 July 1994, he established the Free Patriotic Movement in what he called "The National Conference". He returned to Lebanon on 7 May 2005 after the Cedar Revolution forced the withdrawal of the Syrian forces, and then contested the legislative elections held in late May in early June although it placed him on the head of the largest Christian group of deputies.

=== 2000s ===
In 2006, the FPM signed a memorandum of understanding with Hezbollah organizing their relation and discussing Hezbollah's disarmament, given some conditions. The second and third conditions for disarmament were the return of Lebanese prisoners from Israeli jails and the elaboration of a defense strategy to protect Lebanon from the Israeli threat. The agreement also discussed the importance of having normal diplomatic relations with Syria and the request for information about the Lebanese political prisoners in Syria and the return of all political prisoners and diaspora in Israel.

On 1 December 2006, Free Patriotic Movement leader Michel Aoun declared to a crowd of protesters that the current government of Lebanon was unconstitutional, claiming that the government had "made corruption a daily affair" and called for the resignation of the government. Hundred of thousands of supporters of this party, Amal Movement, and Hezbollah, according to the Internal Security Forces (ISF), gathered at Downtown Beirut trying to force Fouad Siniora to resign.

On 11 July 2008, FPM members, Issam Abu Jamra as deputy-prime minister, Gebran Bassil as minister of telecommunications, and Mario Aoun as minister of social affairs were appointed to the cabinet. It was the Movement's first participation in the Lebanese Government.

Despite the strong media and political war against the Free Patriotic Movement, the results of the 2009 Elections granted the FPM 27 parliamentary seats. The FPM's bloc is the second largest in the Lebanese parliament. The FPM gained 7 more seats than in the 2005 elections, earning at least triple the number of deputies of any other Christian-based bloc in the parliament due to geographical distribution. The total seats won by the March 8 alliance were 57 out of 128, which led to a defeat for the FPM.

In November 2009, the Free Patriotic Movement nominated five ministers to join the first government headed by Saad Hariri. The five ministers included:

- Gebran Bassil as Minister of Energy and Water
- Charbel Nahas as Minister of Telecommunications
- Youssef Saade as Minister of State
- Abraham Dadayan as Minister of Industry
- Fadi Abboud as Minister of Tourism

=== 2010s ===
In June 2011, the Change and Reform bloc led by Aoun nominated eleven ministers to join the second government headed by Najib Mikati, gaining more than double the share they had in the former government. The eleven ministers were:

Ministers with portfolios

- Shakib Qortbawi as Minister of Justice
- Fayez Ghosn as Minister of Defense
- Gebran Bassil as Minister of Energy
- Nicolas Sehnaoui as Minister of Telecommunications
- Vrej Sabounjian as Minister of Industry
- Fadi Aboud as Minister of Tourism
- Charbel Nahas as Minister of Labour ( as pro-FPM)
- Gaby Layoun as Minister of Culture
- Marwan Charbel as Minister of Interior and Municipalities (merge power between Aoun and Michel Suleiman)

Ministers without portfolios

- Salim Karam
- Panos Manjian

==== 2014 government formation ====
In February 2014, the Change and Reform bloc led by Michel Aoun nominated four ministers to join the national unity government headed by Prime Minister Tammam Salam. The Free Patriotic Movement had two ministers:

- Gebran Bassil as Minister of Foreign and Expatriates (Free Patriotic Movement)
- Elias Bou Saab as Minister of Education (Free Patriotic Movement)
- Arthur Nazarian as Minister of Energy (Tashnag Party)
- Ronnie Arayji as Minister of Culture (Marada Movement)

==== Election of Michel Aoun as Lebanese President ====
Lebanese Forces (LF) leader Samir Geagea and Free Patriotic Movement (FPM) Founder MP Michel Aoun turned a historic page in intra-Christian relations when the former 14 March presidential nominee officially endorsed on Monday Aoun's candidacy for the presidency. "I announce after long consideration, discussions and deliberations between members of the executive body of the Lebanese Forces, our endorsement of the candidacy of [former] General Michel Aoun for the presidency," Geagea said in joint news conference with his 8 March rival. Speaking from the LF's headquarters in Maarab where he had met with Aoun shortly before the news conference, Geagea read a 10-point understanding that summarized the key points of the Declaration of Intent struck between the LF and FPM in June.

The commitment to the implementation of the Taif Accord, the need to stop the flow of arms and militants across the Lebanese-Syrian border in both directions, the ratification of a new electoral law and compliance with international resolutions were among the key points agreed upon between the LF and FPM, Geagea said. As he read the key points of his understanding with Aoun, Geagea paused for a moment to tell joke. With humor, the LF leader asked Aoun to urge his son-in-law Foreign Minister Gebran Bassil to act in accordance with the sixth point of their agreement. Geagea was referring to his understanding with the Former general over "the need to adopt an independent foreign policy that guarantees Lebanon's interests and complies with international law." For his part, Aoun thanked Geagea for his support and said he would extend his hands to all political parties. Geagea's official endorsement of Aoun's nomination would provide a significant boost for the former general's presidential bid but it remains unclear how the Future Movement would react to this initiative.

Before his arrival to the LF's headquarters, Aoun met with Maronite Patriarch BecharaRai, who has repeatedly voiced his support for initiatives aimed at breaking the presidential deadlock. "We came to inform the patriarch of the agreement," Aoun said from the seat of the Maronite church. Earlier in the day, Rai had met with former Prime Minister and head of the Future Movement parliamentary bloc Fouad Siniora. Following his meeting with the patriarch, Siniora stressed the need to elect a president who enjoys the support of all Lebanese factions. "We have to work hard to elect a person who can unite all Lebanese people from all political affiliations and promote coexistence among them," said Siniora.

Geagea's endorsement of Aoun is the first time the country's two leading Christian parties have come together on such a pivotal issue after decades of animosity. Geagea, the former 14 March presidential candidate, was caught by surprise when his ally Future Movement leader and former Prime Minister Saad Hariri reportedly nominated Marada Movement Chief Suleiman Franjieh for the presidency. Geagea has staunchly opposed the deal, which stirred up controversy both within the 8 and 14 March camps. Aoun, on the other hand, had shown no signs of giving up his presidential ambitions in favor of Franjieh, a longtime ally of Hezbollah and a member of Aoun's reform and Change parliamentary bloc.

For weeks Hezbollah remained silent over Hariri's proposed settlement, as Franjieh sought to win the support of its allies. Hezbollah finally broke its media silence 29 December 2015, and reaffirmed its support for Aoun's presidential bid.

In the first official statement since Hariri's initiative emerged, Hezbollah's Politburo Chief Sayyed Ibrahim Amin al-Sayyed announced from the seat of the Maronite patriarchate that his party is committed to supporting the presidential bid of its ally Aoun. Aoun and Geagea kicked off talks a year ago. The talks culminated in a Declaration of Intent that paved the way for a surprise visit by Geagea to Aoun's residence in Rabieh in June. The Declaration of Intent has since brought Aoun and Geagea closer together, putting an end to the bitter rivalry between the Christian leaders who fought a devastating war in 1990.

On 31 October 2016, General Michel Aoun was elected by the Lebanese parliament as Lebanon's president, ending a 29-month presidential vacuum.

On 30 October 2022, President Michel Aoun left office a day earlier than when his six-year mandate ended.

=== Bassil sanctions ===
On 6 November 2020, the US Treasury's Office of Foreign Assets Control (OFAC) sanctioned Gebran Bassil, head of the Free Patriotic Movement, member of the Lebanese Parliament, and son-in-law of Lebanese President Michel Aoun. The penalties are due to its role in corruption in Lebanon according to Magnitsky's Global Human Rights Accountability Law. US Secretary of State Stephen T. Munchen: "Systematic corruption in the Lebanese political system represented by Bassil has helped undermine the foundations of an effective government that serves the Lebanese people. This designation also demonstrates that the United States supports the Lebanese people in their continuous calls for reform and accountability."

=== Cooperation with United Russia ===
On 30 March 2022, the party announced a cooperation with United Russia just weeks after the start of the Russian Invasion of Ukraine calling for closer cooperation between Lebanon and Russia.

=== Party expulsions and disputes ===
4 out of 21 MP from the bloc voted for Nabih Berri in the 2022 Speaker of the Lebanese Parliament election. On 23 June 2022, Tashnaq and Yehya named Najib Mikati as prime minister unlike the rest of the bloc. On 10 September 2022, Gebran Bassil kicked out ex-MP Ziad Assouad and ex-MP Mario Aoun. On 10 November 2022, Hagop Pakradounian criticized his colleague in the bloc Jimmy Jabbour for participating in a memorial to the martyrs of the Republic of Azerbaijan in Akkar.

On 6 December 2022, Tashnaq kicked out MP Bouchikian which shrunk the Strong Lebanon bloc to 20. Elias Bou Saab was reportedly kicked out of the Free Patriotic Movement bloc in April 2024 in which FPM sources cited political disagreements since the beginning of the 2022 parliament. Disagreements mostly include choice of presidential candidates and ideological differences. In August 2024, Alain Aoun was expelled from FPM for his lack of alignments with the parliamentary bloc, like refusing to vote for Jihad Azour in the 2022–2025 Lebanese presidential election. On 7 August 2024, Simon Abi Ramia resigned from the Free Patriotic Movement citing "individualism" within the party and disagreements with its leader Gebran Bassil.

In October 2024, leader of the Free Patriotic Movement, Gebran Bassil, announced that the party was no longer in alliance with Hezbollah.

=== In opposition (2025-present) ===
On 26 February 2025, Lebanon's government of new Prime Minister Nawaf Salam won a confidence vote in parliament. The Free Patriotic Movement is not represented in the government and the FPM has positioned itself in opposition.

== FPM internal elections ==
FPM internal elections to elect the party Leader take place every 4 years since 2015.

=== 2015 ===
On 17 August 2015, Minister Gebran Bassil was chosen by General Michel Aoun as the new leader for the Free Patriotic Movement. No elections were done because it could have possibly led to fracturing the party, and so Alain Aoun stepped down from candidacy in order for Bassil to be assigned as the new leader. On 28 February, the party elected his political bureau members:

- Mireille Aoun
- Naji Hayek
- Jimmy Jabbour
- Rindala Jabbour
- Naaman Mrad
- Ziad Najjar

=== 2019 ===
On 1 September 2019, Gebran Bassil was re-elected as FPM leader and May Khreich was elected as vice president.

=== 2023 ===
On 25 August 2023, Gebran Bassil retained FPM leadership by acclamation, Martine Najm Koutayli and Ghassan Khoury were elected vice-presidents for political and administrative affairs. Naji Hayek became vice-president for foreign affairs.

== Media ==
=== OTV ===
The Free Patriotic Movement launched its own broadcasting channel, Orange TV (OTV) on 20 July 2007 where currently the Aoun family directly owns 50%. It is nicknamed 'Orange TV' due to its orange logo, which has been linked with the FPM, whose logo is also orange. The party also opened their own radio station called Sawt Al Mada (English:Voice of Scope) on 1 June 2009. Former party member, Elias Bou Saab, has full ownership of the radio owning directly 24% of the shares and 75% through his holding Jets Holding SAL.

=== Tayyar.org ===
Tayyar.org is an online news platform established in 2001 to promote the agenda of its former leader and former President of Lebanon, General Michel Aoun.

=== Online communities ===
The Orange Room - FPM forum was hosted on Tayyar.org under the domain name forum.tayyar.org until 5 October 2012, when it was shut down due to a disagreement between the founder and FPM's leadership.

The FPM Electronic Army (Arabic: الجيش الإلكتروني للتيار) also known as FEA is one of the biggest electronic armies in Lebanon with over 100k followers on Facebook, headed by Jay Lahoud their slogan is "An Army of PRINCIPLES can Penetrate where an ARMY of soldiers cannot", they have been sharing pro FPM articles under the domain "Siyese 101".

== Parliamentary elections ==
=== 2005 elections and rise of the FPM ===
At the time of the 2005 elections, the FPM came up with a detailed political program which contained economic and political reform plans and gained the support of many Lebanese Christians. The FPM won 21 seats in the parliament, and formed the second biggest bloc in the Lebanese Parliament. Being the leading Christian bloc after the election, it joined the March 8 Alliance.

In 2008, Michel Murr left the change and reform bloc.

=== 2009 elections ===
Despite the strong media and political war against the Free Patriotic Movement, the results of the 2009 Elections granted the FPM 27 parliamentary seats. The FPM's bloc is the second largest in the Lebanese parliament. The FPM gained 7 more seats than in the 2005 elections 3 of those seats belonged exclusively to the Marada Movement party, earning at least triple the number of deputies of any other Christian-based bloc in the parliament due to geographical distribution. The total seats won by the March 8 alliance were 57 out of 128, which led to a defeat for the FPM.

The 27 MP bloc named Change and Reform was formed by FPM (19), Marada (3), Tashnaq (2), LDP (2), Emile Rahme (1).

In 2013 Marada, Emile Rahme and LDP left the bloc which caused the bloc to shrink to 20 MP.

=== 2018 elections ===
The electoral slogan of the party was 'A Strong [FPM] for a Strong Lebanon'. The party formed a number of local coalitions with a wide array alliance partners around the country. In North III FPM fielded the "Strong North" list, headed by Gebran Bassil, in alliance with the Independence Movement and the Future Movement. In Mount Lebanon I (Byblos–Kesrwan) FPM fielded the "Strong Lebanon" list led by Chamel Roukoz. In Mount Lebanon II (Metn) FPM fielded the "Strong Metn" list together with the SSNP and Tashnaq.

After the split between the Future Movement and the Lebanese Forces, a joint list for Beirut I of the Free Patriotic Movement, Tashnaq and the Hunchaks was conceived supported by the Future Movement. In Bekaa I FPM, Future, Tashnaq and independents fielded a joint list. In North I (Akkar) and South II (Saida-Jezzine) FPM formed electoral alliances with al-Jamaat al-Islamiyya. In North II FPM fielded a list in alliance with Kamal Kheir. Moreover, whilst FPM and the Amal-Hezbollah coalition parted ways nationally, joint lists were presented in Beirut II, Mount Lebanon III (Baabda), and Bekaa II (West Bekaa-Rachaya).

In Bekaa III (Baalbek-Hermel) FPM had hoped to form a list together with former speaker Hussein el-Husseini, but the project fell apart as el-Husseini withdrew from the electoral process. In the end, the Free Patriotic Movement candidates joined the list led by the former regional secretary of the Baath Party, Faiz Shukr.

In South III the Future Movement, the Free Patriotic Movement and the Lebanese Democratic Party supported a joint list called "The South is Worth It", with two FPM-supported independents.

Following the announcement of results, Gebran Bassil stated that FPM and its Strong Lebanon bloc would form the largest bloc in parliament (a role previously played by the Future Movement). Bassil stated that FPM would gather up to 30 MPs, including Talal Arslan and Tashnaqs.

The 29 MP bloc named Strong Lebanon was formed by FPM (19), Tashnaq (3), Moustafa Hussein (1), LDP (1), Chamel Roukoz (1), Neemat Frem (1), Elie Ferzli (1),Michel Daher (1), Michel Moawad (1).

At the beginning of the 17 October Revolution, Neemat Frem, Chamel Roukoz and Michel Moawad left the bloc.

After the 2020 Beirut explosion, Michel Daher left the bloc.

In April 2021, Elie Ferzli left the bloc.

On 1 March 2022, MP Hikmat Dib resigned from FPM causing the bloc to shrink to 23 MP.

=== 2022 elections ===
Free Patriotic Movement lost seats in the 15 May 2022 elections. The Free Patriotic Movement, was no longer the biggest Christian party in the parliament after the election. The Lebanese Forces became the largest Christian party in Parliament.

The 2022 Strong Lebanon bloc was formed by FPM (17), Tashnaq (3) and Akkar MP Mohamad Yehya.

On 6 December 2022, Tashnaq kicked out MP Bouchikian which shrunk the Strong Lebanon bloc to 20.

=== Election summary ===
Election year	# of overall votes	% of overall vote	# of overall seats won	+/–	Leader
2005		11.71%	15 / 128	New	Michel Aoun
2009			19 / 128	▲4	Michel Aoun
2018	224,317 (#3)	13.70%	24 / 128	▲5	Gebran Bassil
2022	144,646 (#2)	8.00%	17 / 128	▼7	Gebran Bassil
