= Joseph Abu Fadel =

Lebanese journalist, political analyst and lawyer

Joseph Abu Fadel (Arabic: جوزيف أبو فاضل) is a Lebanese journalist, political analyst and lawyer. He wrote extensively about the political situation in the Middle-East and the relationship with Israel. He was an outspoken supporter of the Syrian regime, and the Free Patriotic Movement of which he later split. He had physically assaulted a Syrian activist who support the occupation of Lebanon by the Syrians from 1990 to 2005 Syrian occupation of Lebanon. On Al-Jazeera TV shows Al-Ittijah Al-Mu'akis on January 31, 2012.
