= Ibrahim Amin al-Sayyed =

Lebanese Hezbollah leader (born 1960)

- إبراهيم أمين السيد
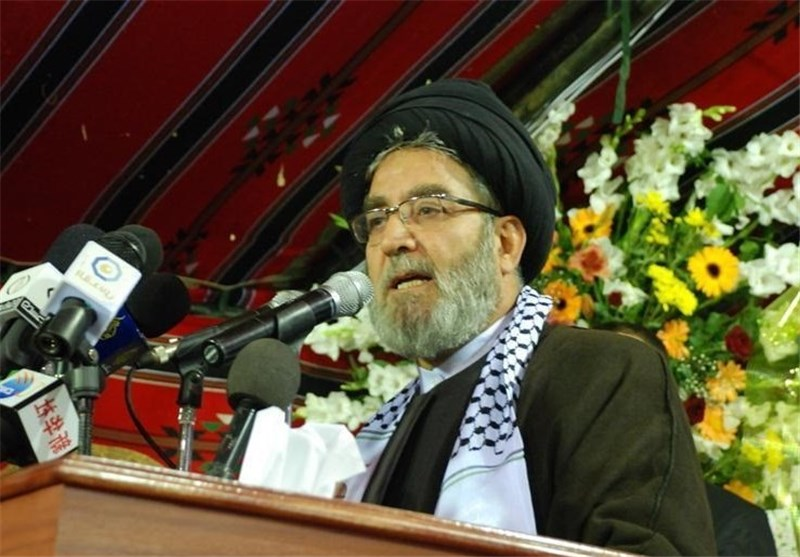
- Al Sayyed in 2014

Head of the Political Council of Hezbollah

Personal details
- Born: 1960 (age 65–66) Haouch al-Nabi, Baalbek District, Lebanon
- Party: Hezbollah
- Website: ibrahim-alsayed.org

Ibrahim Amin al-Sayyed (Arabic: إبراهيم أمين السيد; born 1960) is the Head of the Political Council of Hezbollah. Following the assassination of Hassan Nasrallah and that of his potential successor Hashem Safieddine, Lebanese sources have mentioned al-Sayyed as a potential candidate for the position of Hezbollah's Secretary-General.

Due to his roles in Hezbollah, the United States has imposed economic sanctions on him.

== Biography ==
=== Early life and education ===
Al-Sayyed was born in 1960 in the village of Haouch al-Nabi, located in the Baalbek District of eastern Lebanon. He pursued his religious studies in Qom, Iran, one of the key centers of Shia Islamic learning.

=== Early political involvement ===
In the early 1980s, Al-Sayyed was involved with the Amal movement, serving as its representative in Iran. However, at the urging of Iranian officials, he became critical of Amal's leadership, particularly Nabih Berri, and publicly announced his defection from the party during a press conference in Tehran. His defection marked the beginning of his deep involvement with Hezbollah.

Returning to Lebanon, al-Sayyed became one of the senior figures within Hezbollah, particularly within a faction under the spiritual guidance of Ayatollah Mohammad Hussein Fadlallah, known as "Dawlat Hezbollah Lubnan." This group became one of the core components of the Hezbollah movement.

=== Role in Hezbollah ===
Al-Sayyed quickly rose through the ranks of Hezbollah. In 1985, as the group was still in its formative years, he served as its official spokesperson. He is perhaps best known for his announcement of Hezbollah’s manifesto, the "Open Letter," on February 16, 1985, a foundational document outlining Hezbollah's ideology and goals, including its resistance to Israeli occupation and its desire to establish an Islamic republic.

Later, he was dispatched to Beirut, where he represented Hezbollah in the predominantly Shiite southern suburbs, spreading the party’s message and solidifying its presence in the area. During this period, al-Sayyed was the superior of future Hezbollah Secretary General Hassan Nasrallah. Both al-Sayyed and Nasrallah also acted as key liaisons between Hezbollah and Iran, coordinating with Iranian diplomats, most notably Mohammad Nourani, who served as Iran’s chargé d'affaires in Beirut from 1981 to 1985.

=== Internal disputes and factional struggle ===
In 1988, a significant ideological dispute arose between two factions within Hezbollah. Sheikh Subhi al-Tufaili, supported by al-Sayyed, advocated for the immediate establishment of an Islamic republic in Lebanon, focusing all available resources on this goal. In contrast, Ayatollah Fadlallah, backed by others within the party, including Nasrallah, believed that Hezbollah should adapt to the changing political environment, particularly in light of the Taif Agreement and Syria’s new dominant role in Lebanese politics. Ultimately, al-Sayyed aligned with Nasrallah, prioritizing the group’s survival and armed resistance against Israel over the immediate creation of an Islamic state.

== Political career ==
In the early 1990s, al-Sayyed transitioned from being a primarily religious and military figure to holding formal political office. During Hezbollah’s second conclave in 1991, some sources, such as Magnus Ranstorp in Hizb’allah in Lebanon: The Politics of the Western Hostage Crisis, claim that he was appointed Hezbollah’s Deputy Secretary General, though others state that Naim Qassem took this position.

In 1992, al-Sayyed was elected to the Lebanese Parliament as a representative of the Bekaa District as part of Hezbollah’s "Loyalty to the Resistance Bloc." He was re-elected in 1996, serving in the Lebanese legislature during crucial years for Hezbollah’s political integration.

== Leadership roles and current position ==
In 1994, al-Sayyed played a central role in the creation of Hezbollah’s "Islamic Center Association for Guidance and Higher Education," an institution aimed at promoting religious education and scholarly work within the Shia community. During Hezbollah’s sixth conclave in 2001, he was elected to the party’s Shura Council and took over as the head of its Political Council, replacing Mohammad Raad. He has maintained this influential position ever since, shaping Hezbollah’s political strategy both within Lebanon and in its dealings with international actors.

Al-Sayyed remains a key figure in Hezbollah’s leadership, with a long-standing influence on both the political and religious aspects of the movement. His contributions to the party’s development and his deep ties with Iranian leadership have made him one of the most respected and influential leaders within the organization.
