= Simon Abi Ramia =

Lebanese politician

- سيمون ابي رميا
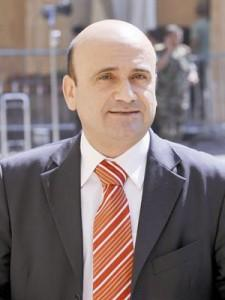

Member of the Lebanese Parliament
- Incumbent
- Assumed office 7 June 2009
- Constituency: Byblos (2009, 2018, 2022)

Personal details
- Born: 3 June 1965 (age 61)
- Party: Free Patriotic Movement (until 2024)
- Other political affiliations: Strong Lebanon (2018–2024)
- Spouse: Fabienne Blineau (divorced)
- Children: 3 (Paul, Mathieu, and Lucas)

Simon Abi Ramia (Arabic: سيمون ابي رميا; born 3 June 1965) is a Lebanese politician and ex-member of the Strong Lebanon bloc in the Lebanese parliament. He was close to president Michel Aoun and was affiliated with the Free Patriotic Movement. He was also the chairman of the parliamentary commission of youth and sports.

== Early life and family ==
Simon Abi Ramia was born on 3 June 1965 in the village of Ehmej, Byblos District to Farid Abi Ramia, who died in 2003, and Nour Hardan. He continued his primary and complementary studies at the schools of the Christian Brothers" and his secondary studies at the Collège Mont La Salle. He traveled to France in 1983 and received a baccalaureate in management from the University of Paris 1 and a diploma of Optometry in L'École Supérieure d'Optométrie in Paris.

== Career ==
Abi Ramia became active after Michel Aoun's disputed tenure as prime minister in 1998. He co-founded a group of militants believing in the liberating action of General Michel Aoun, the Rassemblement pour le Liban (Rally for Lebanon) which followed the agenda of general Aoun.

The Lebanese effort in France was brought together by this gathering to bring together Lebanese organisations which are active in the different cities of France. He was elected president of this gathering in 1989. In 2005, Abi Ramia joined General Michel Aoun's return to Lebanon. He was elected president of this gathering in 1989. In 2005, Simon Abi Ramia joined General Michel Aoun's return to Lebanon after his exile.

In September 2006, he returned to Lebanon with his family after the end of the July War the same year. In 2009, he presented himself for the legislative elections of the district of Jbeil and was elected as part of the Free Patriotic Movement Bloc. He was once again elected during the legislative elections of 2018 and 2022 and took leadership of the Youth and Sports Committee in parliament. Three months after his election, he was appointed president of the parliamentary friendship group between Lebanon and France.

On 8 August 2024, Abi Ramia resigned from the Free Patriotic Movement citing "individualism" within the party and disagreements with its leader Gebran Bassil.

== Personal life ==
Abi Ramia married French politician Fabienne Blineau in 1997 but are divorced since 2017. They had 3 children together; Paul, Mathieu, and Lucas.
