= Neemat Frem =

Lebanese businessman and member of parliament and manager of Steak Bar

- نعمة افرام
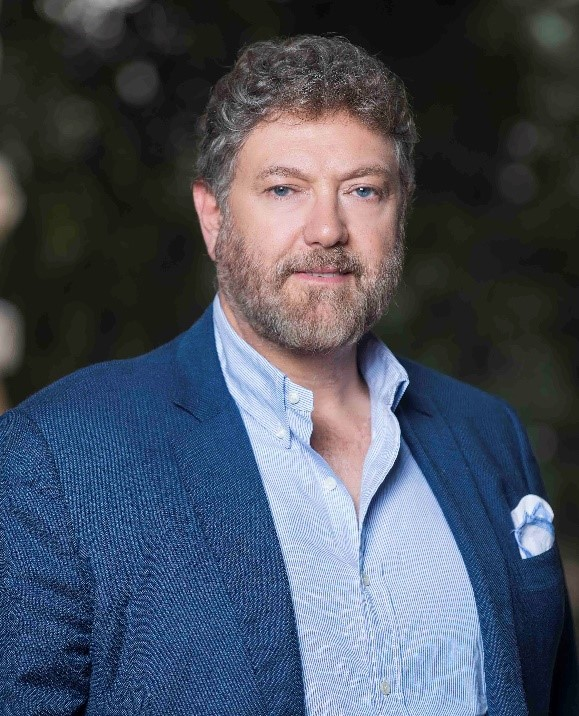
- Official portrait as a Lebanese MP
- Born: Neemat Georges Frem; 10 September 1967 (age 59); Jounieh, Keserwan, Lebanon
- Education: American University of Beirut
- Occupations: Engineer, businessman, politician, inventor
- Political party: Independent
- Spouse: Zena Nakhle
- Children: 4
- Parents: Georges Frem (father); Hayat El Khazen (mother)

Member of the Parliament of Lebanon from Mount Lebanon I
- Incumbent
- Assumed office May 2022
- In office 2018 – 2020 (resigned)

President of the Executive Board of "Project Watan"
- Incumbent
- Assumed office 2021

Chairman and CEO of INDEVCO Group
- Incumbent
- Assumed office 2006

President of the Association of Lebanese Industrialists
- In office 2010–2014
- Website: neematfrem.com

Neemat Georges Frem (Arabic: نعمة جورج افرام; born 10 September 1967) is a Lebanese politician, businessman, and entrepreneur. He is currently a Member of the Lebanese Parliament representing the Keserwan and Byblos constituency and has been serving since May 2022.

== Early life and education ==
Neemat Frem was born on 10 September 1967 in Jounieh, Keserwan of Lebanon. He is the son of INDEVCO Group founder Georges Frem, a Lebanese politician who served as a minister in various cabinets over three periods, between 1982 and 2003.

He completed school at Collège Saint Joseph – Antoura, and graduated from the American University of Beirut with a bachelor's degree in Electrical Engineering in 1991. He then completed a postgraduate diploma on leadership and business from Harvard University Business School, Georgetown University Business School and Stanford University Business School.

In July 2018, Frem received a Doctorate Honoris Causa from the Holy Spirit University of Kaslik.

== Career ==
Frem began his career in the business sector.

=== Business career ===
After graduating from the American University of Beirut (AUB) in 1991, Frem became Design and Project coordinator at INDEVCO Group, his family firm which is an international group of companies manufacturing corrugated, plastic and paper packaging, tissue, as well as household, institutional, and personal care disposables. In 1994, he was appointed the General Manager of Unipak Tissue Mill. Currently he is the company's Chief Executive.

In 1998, he founded and managed Phoenix Machinery, with a view to bridging the distance between the traditional activities of INDEVCO and the technology industry. The company is a provider of renewable energy and waste management services, as well as engineering products to the Middle East and North Africa. In response to the increasing demand during COVID-19 pandemic in Lebanon in 2020, the company started manufacturing ICU ventilators conforming to ISO 9001:2015, ISO 13485:2016, CE certificate: medical devices directive 93/42/EEC (21449), LIBNOR, FDA certificate in collaboration with AUH. Frem is currently president of Phoenix Machinery and also the president of Phoenix Group.

During the economic crisis in Lebanon, intensified by the fuel shortage, Phoenix EV also provided the Lebanese with a fleet of electric cars. In 2000, Frem was appointed Managing Director for all INDEVCO Lebanon Operations until 2005 when he then became the Chairman and chief executive officer (CEO) of INDEVCO Group. Neemat Frem also served as the CEO of Interstate Resources, Inc. (IRI) in the US.

Neemat Frem served as the President of the Association of Lebanese Industrialists (ALI) from 2010 to 2014. In 2017, he financed the launch of the Olive Grove, a new cluster of tech startups in Hamra, Beirut.

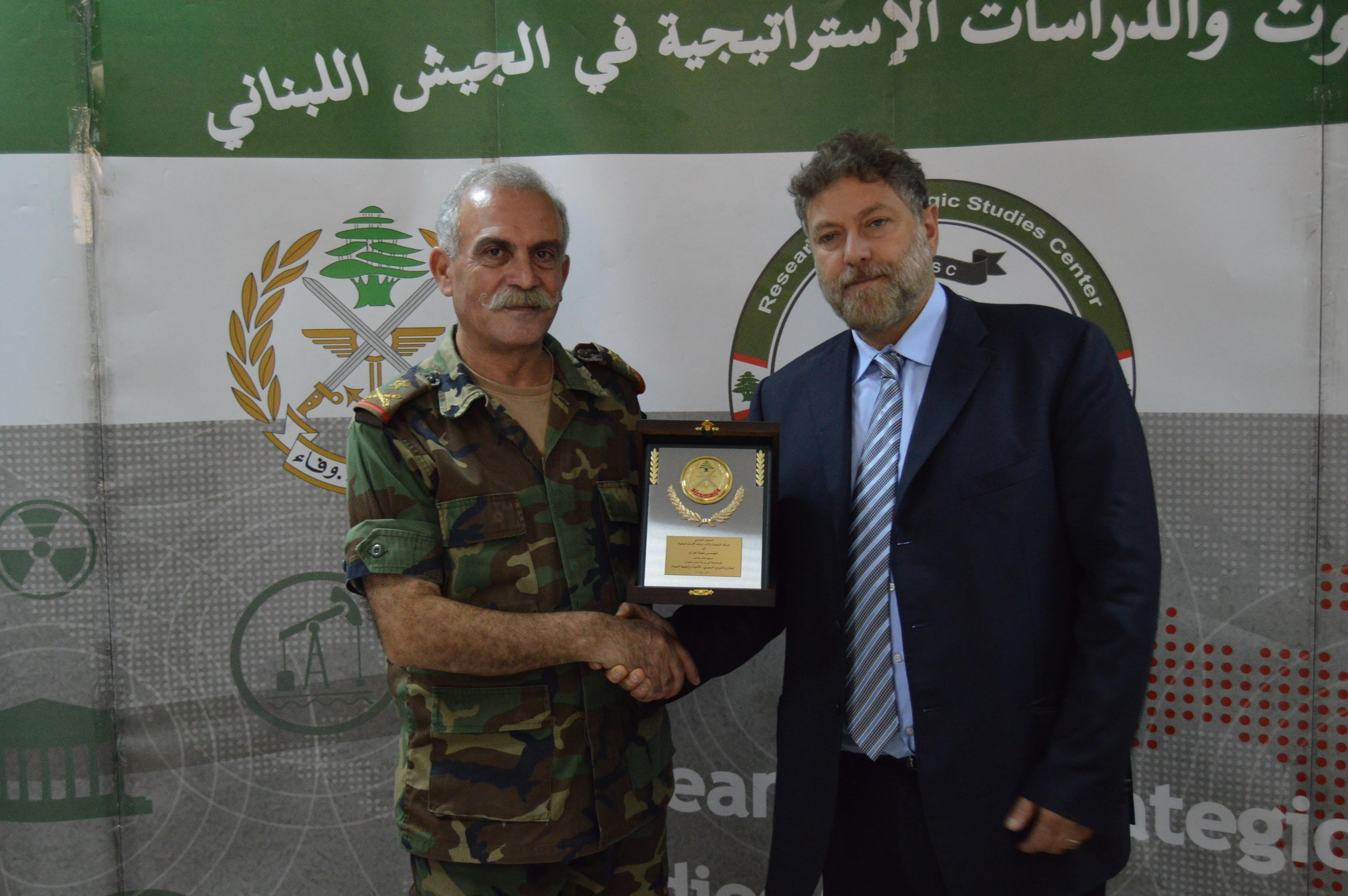
Frem at Research and Strategic Studies Center of Lebanon.

=== Political career ===
Neemat Frem is the founder and Board Member of several associations promoting inter-religious (Christian-Islamic) dialogue. In 2013, he launched "Better Lebanon" initiative, a national, holistic, and visionary approach to propelling Lebanon's economic, social and governance reforms. In 2019, the initiative was institutionalized as an NGO, which coordinates with other organizations and the Diaspora to provide sustainable development, humanitarian aid and social support.

Between 2016 and 2018 he served as presided over the Maronite Foundation in the World. In 2018, Frem announced his candidacy for the 2018 Lebanese General Election, running for the Maronite seat in the Keserwan and Byblos constituency. His campaign driver was "People First". Following the general election held on 6 May 2018, he was officially announced as a winning candidate.

Frem served as the Chair of the Commission of the National Economy, Trade, Industry and Planning. He called for the restructuring of the Lebanese public administration to boost national productivity. He was the first deputy to inquire about the Lebanese administration's recruitments figures. Frem presented a bill to the parliament to cancel old municipal payables under Sukleen and help face one of the biggest forms of endemic corruption in the country.

In late February 2020, Better Lebanon founded by Frem, prepared a master plan to help equip Lebanon to respond to the COVID-19 pandemic. They partnered with INDEVCO and Phoenix Machinery to manufacture state-of-the-art ventilators and cost-efficient personal protective equipment meeting international standards. In October 2020, as the Chair of the Commission of the National Economy, Trade, Industry and Planning Frem elaborated a 5-year plan to achieve a zero budget deficit to rescue Lebanon from the economic crisis and presented it to all concerned officials as a proposed framework for future government budgets and a major guideline for ministries, public institutions and administrations. Despite all the warnings of the commission, the public administration ignored all the corrective actions presented in this plan. Shortly after the Beirut explosion, on 9 August 2020, he announced his resignation from the parliament in protest against the corruption and the unproductivity of the Lebanese political system that led to the financial collapse and the destruction of Beirut.

In July 2021, determined to face the total collapse of the Lebanese State and alleviate the dire economic situation wrecking the Lebanese's daily lives, Frem – together with a group of other political figures – launched "Project Watan", a national political movement. According to the founders, "Project Watan" strives to shape a new creative identity for Lebanon through large-scale reforms and serious plans for political, social, cultural and economic development. Currently he is still president of the executive board.

In 2022, Frem announced his candidacy for the 2022 Lebanese General Election, running for the Maronite seat in the Keserwan and Byblos constituency. His campaign driver was "Vote for Happiness". Following the general election held on 15 May 2022, he was officially announced as a winning candidate. In December 2024 he officially announced his candidacy for the Lebanese presidency, representing the Project Watan movement and emphasizing the implementation of UN Security Council Resolution 1701.

== Other mandates ==
- Member of Immigrants and Foreign Affairs Committee.
- Founder and Board Member of a number of associations promoting inter-religious (Christian – Islamic) dialogue and civic society.
- Founder and president of Phellipolis, the association that organizes the Jounieh International Festival
