= Fadi Abboud =

Lebanese politician and businessman

Minister of Tourism
- In office 13 June 2011 – 15 February 2014
- Prime Minister: Najib Mikati
- Preceded by: Himself
- Succeeded by: Michel Pharoun

Minister of Tourism
- In office 2009–2011
- Prime Minister: Saad Hariri
- Succeeded by: Himself

Personal details
- Born: 21 March 1955 (age 71) Sakiyat Al Misk
- Children: Two
- Education: University of Westminster
- Website: Official website

Fadi Abboud (Arabic: فادي عبود; born 21 March 1955) is a Lebanese politician and businessman.

== Early life and education ==
Abboud was born into a Maronite Christian family in Sakiyat Al Misk on 21 March 1955. He graduated from the International School of Choueifat and later studied economics at the University of Westminster in London.

== Career ==
Abboud began his career as the chairman of General Packaging Industries in 1982. He was twice appointed the president of the Association of Lebanese Industrialists. He was also a member of the American Lebanese Chamber of Commerce and the International Chamber of Commerce.

He was appointed minister of tourism in the Saad Hariri's cabinet in November 2009. He was reappointed to the same post in the Najib Mikati's cabinet in June 2011. Abboud's term ended on 15 February 2014, and Michel Pharoun was appointed tourism minister.

=== Alliances ===
Abboud is close to the Syrian Socialist Nationalist Party and the Free Patriotic Movement.

== Personal life ==
Abboud married Sara Lilianna Saban in 1986. They have two children.
