= Change and Reform bloc =

Defunct coalition in the Lebanese parliament

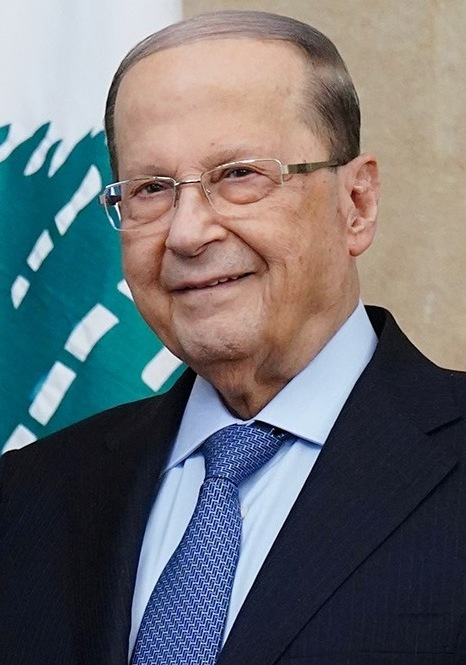
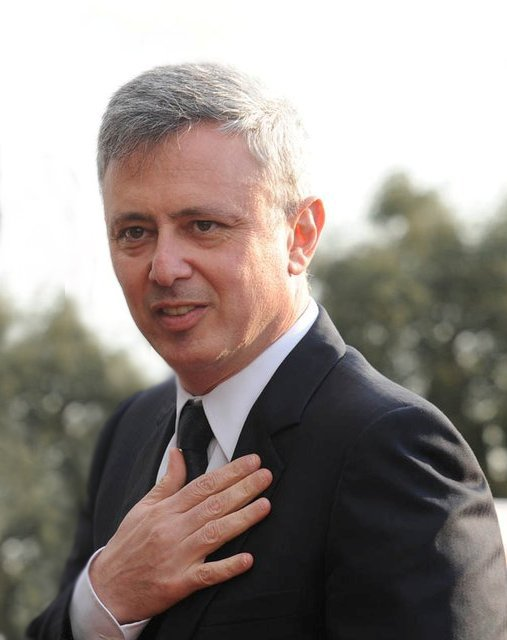
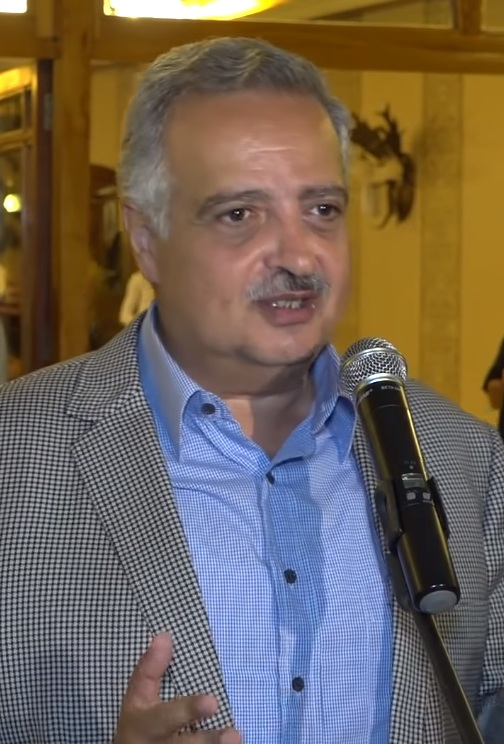
The main party leaders of the bloc
- Top left: Michel Aoun, leader of the Free Patriotic Movement.
- Top right: Suleiman Frangieh, Jr., leader of the Marada Movement.
- Bottom left: Hagop Pakradounian, leader of the Tashnag.
- Bottom right: Talal Arslan, leader of the Lebanese Democratic Party.

The Change and Reform bloc was a bloc in the Parliament of Lebanon that represented the Free Patriotic Movement and its allies, including the Marada Movement, the Tachnag Party, the Lebanese Democratic Party, and several independent deputies.

The bloc was formed in June 2005 at the end of the 2005 parliamentary elections with 21 deputies. It was headed by General Michel Aoun and was then in opposition to the government of Fouad Siniora and the March 14 alliance from 2005 to 2008. The parliamentary bloc included 27 deputies since the Lebanese legislative elections of 2009. On June 13, 2011, it was part of the Mikati government with 10 ministerial portfolios being a member of the parliamentary majority. In 2015, leadership of the Free Patriotic Movement was given to Gebran Bassil.

The Change and Reform bloc was succeeded by the Strong Lebanon bloc after the 2018 elections.

== Electoral history ==
Election year	% of overall vote	Seats by bloc parties	# of overall seats won	+/–	Leader
2005	11.71%	Free Patriotic Movement: 15 / 128	21 / 128	New	Michael Aoun
2005	11.71%	Popular Bloc: 5 / 128	21 / 128	New	Michael Aoun
2005	11.71%	Tashnag party: 1 / 128	21 / 128	New	Michael Aoun
2009		Free Patriotic Movement: 19 / 128	27 / 128	▲4	Michael Aoun
2009		Marada Movement: 3 / 128	27 / 128	▲4	Michael Aoun
2009		Lebanese Democratic Party: 2 / 128	27 / 128	▲4	Michael Aoun
2009		Tashnag party: 2 / 128	27 / 128	▲4	Michael Aoun
2009		Solidarity Party: 1 / 128	27 / 128	▲4	Michael Aoun
