= Elie Ferzli =

Lebanese politician

Elie Ferzli إيلي الفرزلي
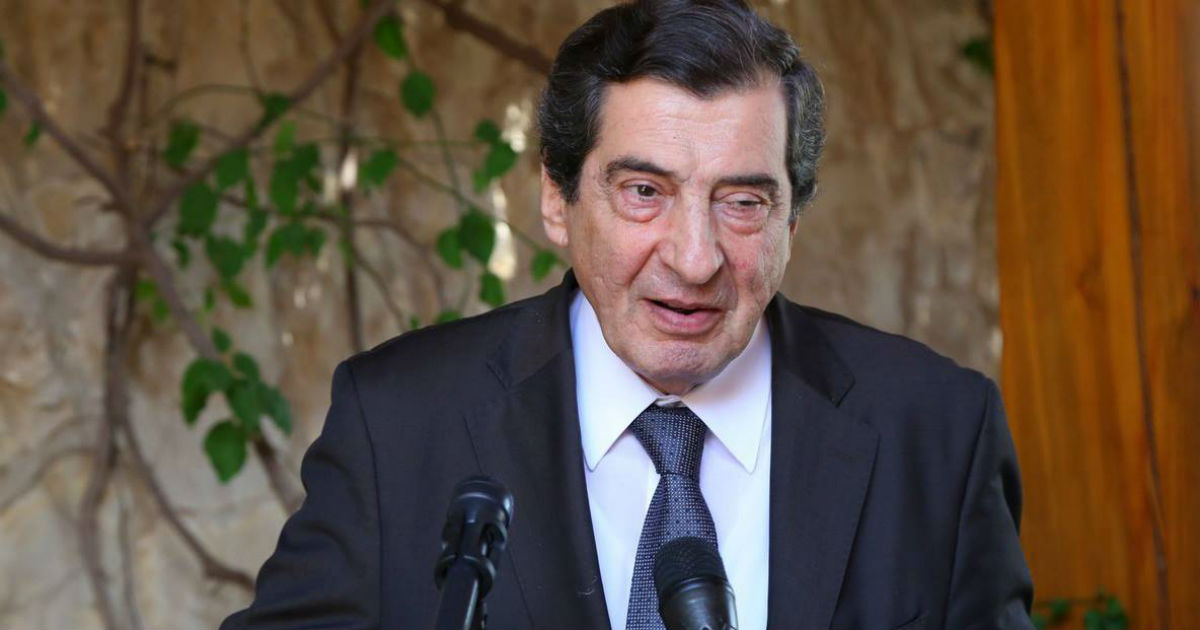

Deputy Speaker of the Parliament of Lebanon
- In office 2018 – 31 May 2022
- Succeeded by: Elias Bou Saab

Member of the Lebanese parliament

Information Minister

Personal details
- Born: 22 November 1949 (age 76) Zahle, Lebanon
- Occupation: Politician

Elie Ferzli (Arabic: إيلي الفرزلي; born 22 November 1949 in Zahle, Lebanon) is a Lebanese lawyer and politician. He served as Information Minister and Deputy Speaker of the Parliament of Lebanon in the early 2000s. He was succeeded by as deputy speaker Farid Makari in 2005. He expressed pro-Syrian sentiments during the Cedar Revolution.

Born to a Greek Orthodox Christian family that has its roots in Syria, his career is marked by long-term parliamentary service, and active involvement in legislative and constitutional debates during periods of national crisis.

On 23 May 2018, he was reelected to parliament, and took again the seat of Deputy Speaker of the Parliament of Lebanon. In 2021, he defended the government’s decision to vaccinate all members of parliament against COVID-19 in order to ensure the continuity of parliamentary sessions during the country’s financial crisis. In May 2022, he lost his parliamentary seat following a heated election.
