= Alain Aoun =

Lebanese politician (born 1971)

- آلان عون
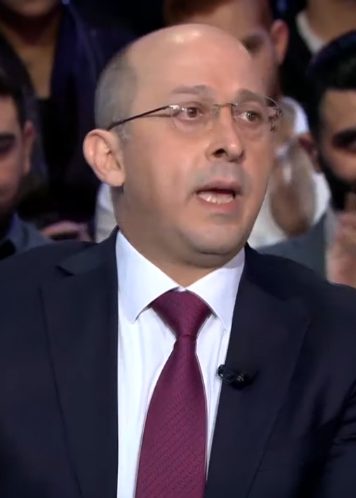
- Alain Aoun during an episode of the Sar al Waqt (It's Time) television show in 2020
- Born: Alain Joseph Aoun; 1971 (age 54–55); Lebanon
- Education: ESCP Business School, École supérieure des affaires (Beirut)
- Occupations: Politician, Member of the Lebanese Parliament, Engineer, Finance, MBA
- Years active: 1994–present
- Political party: Free Patriotic Movement (until 2024); Independent (2024-present)
- Spouse: Sarah Souhaid
- Children: 3

Alain Joseph Aoun (Arabic: آلان جوزيف عون; born 1971) is a Lebanese politician and former member of the Strong Lebanon bloc in the Lebanese parliament.

He is a telecom engineer and holder of an MBA and a MSc in finance, and a nephew of Lebanese President Michel Aoun. He has been part of the Free Patriotic Movement since its creation. He was elected Maronite Member of Parliament for the constituency of Baabda on 7 June 2009, on the Change and Reform list. He was re-elected on 6 May 2018 for a third term. On 20 May 2018, he was elected by the general assembly as Secretary of the Lebanese Parliament.

== Biography ==
After a professional career spent mainly within the Alcatel group where he held several positions (tendering, construction of telecommunication fixed/mobile networks) in France and abroad, he devoted himself entirely to politics. His political career began when he joined the FPM from its creation when General Michel Aoun then head of government (1988–1990) launched the War of Liberation against the Syrian occupation of Lebanon. After General Aoun's exile in France, Alain Aoun co-founded the Rassemblement pour le Liban (RPL), the official representative of the FPM in France, where he was established. Within the RPL in France and then the FPM in Lebanon, Alain Aoun held several positions of responsibility and took part in all the activities of the FPM in its struggle for the liberation of Lebanon from the Syrian occupation. He has been arrested several times for political reasons. Back in Lebanon, he took part within the FPM in the Cedar Revolution in 2005 which led to the withdrawal of Syrian forces from Lebanon as well as the return of General Michel Aoun to the country after 15 years of exile. He published various writings and articles in the press around the events in Lebanon.

On 7 June 2009, he stood for the legislative elections and was elected Maronite deputy for the constituency of Baabda, on the list of the Change and Reform bloc. On 17 August 2015, Foreign Minister Gebran Bassil was chosen by Michel Aoun as the new leader of the Free Patriotic Movement. No elections were done because it could have possibly led to fracturing the party, and so Alain Aoun stepped down from the candidacy in order for Bassil to be assigned as the new leader. Alain expressed dismay at this electoral process. He was re-elected on 6 May 2018 for a third term. On 20 May 2018, he was elected by the general assembly, secretary of the Lebanese Parliament.

On 20 October 2020, he was re-elected as secretary of the parliament.

In August 2024, Alain Aoun left FPM after a dispute with the party leader over his lack of alignments with the parliamentary bloc, like refusing to vote for Jihad Azour in the 2022–2025 Lebanese presidential election.

== Personal life ==
Aoun is married to Sarah Souhaid with whom he has three kids. His father, Joseph, died on 14 March 2018. His uncle is Michel Aoun.
