= Mahmoud Awad =

Lebanese politician

Mahmoud Awad (Arabic: محمود عواد) is a Lebanese Shia politician and pediatrician. He was elected to parliament in 1992 and 1996. Awad is a member of the board of the Zahra Hospital.
