= INDEVCO Group =

International group of manufacturing companies

INDEVCO Group (Industrial Development Company), an international group of manufacturing companies, manufactures corrugated, plastic and paper packaging, tissue, as well as household, institutional, and personal care disposables. The group has its headquarters in Ajaltoun, Lebanon, and operates in over 65 countries. It employs approximately 9400 people in 60 companies.

== Business divisions ==
The Group is divided into four main divisions for Africa, Europe, Middle East, and North America.

Their consumer products division comprises five companies, manufacturing consumer products. from factories located in Egypt, Iraq, Lebanon, Saudi Arabia and United Arab Emirates.

Their paper containers division is composed of 12 corrugated packaging manufacturing plants in Egypt, Greece, Lebanon, Saudi Arabia, and United States.

Their flexible packaging division contains 10 manufacturing plants for paper and plastic films and bags in Lebanon and Saudi Arabia.

Their paper manufacturing division includes four manufacturing plants in Egypt, Lebanon, and United States. Plants in Egypt and Lebanon produce 100% recycled, partially recycled, and virgin paper, while the ones in the US manufacture recycled and kraft linerboard, and recycled corrugated medium.

== Other divisions ==
Some lines of business fall outside these four divisions:

Phoenix Group of Companies, operating Phoenix Machinery and Phoenix Energy, Phoenix manufactures machinery for tissue and hygiene converting for the Middle East and North Africa (MENA) region. It also manufactures CNC components and machined parts and refurbishes used machinery.

Phoenix Energy supplies renewable energy products for the Middle East and North Africa., including solar water heaters and biomass boilers

Snaidero Middle East, a joint venture with the Italian furniture manufacturer Snaidero, manufactures kitchen cabinets, and other household furniture.
