= Mount Lebanon I =

Electoral district in Lebanon

- Constituency for the Parliament of Lebanon
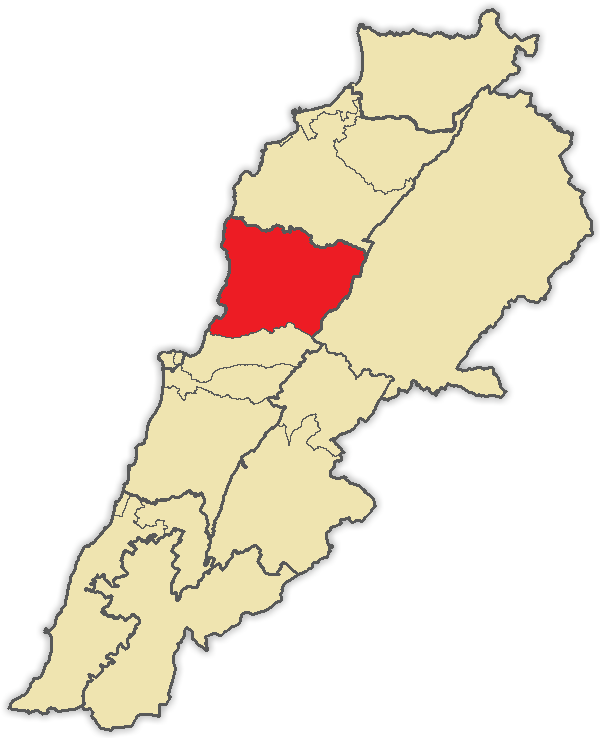
- Governorate: Mount Lebanon
- Electorate: 176,818 (2018)

Current constituency
- Created: 2017
- Number of members: 8 (7 Maronite, 1 Shia)

Mount Lebanon I (Arabic: دائرة جبل لبنان الأولى) is an electoral district in Lebanon, as per the 2017 vote law. The district elects 8 members of the Lebanese National Assembly - 7 Maronites and 1 Shia. The constituency contains two 'minor districts', Byblos (corresponding to Byblos District) and Kesrwan (corresponding to Kesrwan District). The Byblos 'minor district' elects 2 Maronite and 1 Shia parliamentarian, whilst the Kesrwan 'minor district' elects 5 Maronite parliamentarians.

== Electorate ==
The electorate is predominantly Christian; Maronites make up 75.4% of the electorate, 10.4% Shia, 4.1% Greek Orthodox, 3.6% Greek Catholic, 1.9% Sunni and 4% other Christian communities.

Below data by 'minor district' from 2017;

District	Sunni		Shia		Druze		Alawite		Maronite		Greek Orthodox		Greek Catholic		Armenian Orthodox		Armenian Catholic		Syriac Orthodox		Syriac Catholic		Other Minorities (Note: The Minorities quota includes six different Christian sects Syriac Orthodox, Syriac Catholic, Latin Catholics, Assyrians, Chaldean Catholics and Copts.)		Evangelical		Jews		"Others" (Note: Presumably consisting mainly of individuals whose sectarian affiliation has not been identified and/or individuals not belonging to any of the 18 recognized sects.)		Total
District	No.	%	No.	%	No.	%	No.	%	No.	%	No.	%	No.	%	No.	%	No.	%	No.	%	No.	%	No.	%	No.	%	No.	%	No.	%	No.
Byblos	2,770	3.39	16,529	20.25	11	0.01	8	0.01	54,718	67.03	3,708	4.54	1,541	1.89	999	1.22	124	0.15	207	0.25	115	0.14	339	0.42	166	0.20			399	0.49	81,634
Kesrwan	557	0.59	1,717	1.83	29	0.03	8	0.01	77,487	82.70	3,547	3.79	4,763	5.08	1,581	1.69	779	0.83	726	0.77	573	0.61	1,066	1.14	263	0.28	3	0.00	595	0.64	93,694
Source: Lebanon Files

== 2018 election ==
In Byblos-Kesrwan electoral district 5 lists were registered. The lists in the fray are the "Strong Lebanon" (supported by Free Patriotic Movement), the "National Solidarity" (Hezbollah), the "Anna al-Qarar" list (alliance between Kataeb Party, Fares Souhaid, Farid Heikal Al Khazen and independents, supported by Marada Movement), the "Clear Change" list (supported by Lebanese Forces) and the "Kulluna Watani" (We are all National) list.

In difference with previous elections, FPM and Hezbollah did not join forces on a common list. Hezbollah fielded its own list, with a Shia candidate (Hussein Zuaitar) from Baalbek. The list included the former Telecommunications Minister Jean Louis Cardahi, dissident FPM politician Bassam Hachem and 4 other independents.

The FPM list was led by General Chamel Roukoz, with World Maronite Foundation president Neemat Frem, former minister Ziad Baroud and former parliamentarian Mansour al-Bon, amongst others.

The Kataeb-Souhaid supported list sought to include personalities from civil society. It included former National Bloc general secretary Jean Hawat. There was resistance from Kataeb side to field incumbent parliamentarians Youssef Khalil and Gilberte Zouein, since they were linked to the Change and Reform Bloc.

The "Kulluna Watani" (We are all National) list included former minister Youssef Salame.

=== Result by lists ===
List	Votes	% of electoral district	Seats	Members elected	Parties
"Strong Lebanon"	54,544	47.18	4		FPM
"Clear Change"	26,980	23.34	2		LF-NLP
"Anna al-Qarar"	18,553	16.05	2		Kataeb
"National Solidarity"	12,551	10.86	0		Hezbollah-Independents
"Kulluna Watani"	2,526	2.18	0		Civil society-LCP
