= Arthur Nazarian =

Lebanese businessman and politician (born 1951)

Arthur Nazarian (born 1951) is a Lebanese businessman and Member of Parliament of Armenian descent. He was the Ministry of Energy in the national unity government headed by Prime Minister Tammam Salam. He has held minister positions in two government agencies, Environment from 1998 to 2000 and Tourism. He was elected in the 2009 elections as a candidate of the Tashnag party, without any opponent in Beirut's second district for one of the Armenian Orthodox seats. He is a member of the Armenian General Benevolent Union.

== Biography ==
Nazarian was born in Beirut in 1951. He pursued his university studies in the United States, where he graduated as a textile engineer in 1973. He works in trade and industry, and owns several companies in the Gulf. He was appointed Minister of Tourism and Environment in the government of Prime Minister Salim Hoss in 1998, the first government under President Emile Lahoud. He was elected member of the Parliament in 2009. He is the former Minister of Energy & Water.

== Personal life ==
Nazarian married Tamar Kalaijian. They have three sons, Gary, Alex, & Peter.
