= Collège Mont La Salle =

International school in Ain Saadeh, Lebanon

Collège Mont La Salle (MLS) is a French international school in Ain Saadeh, Lebanon. It serves from toute petite section through terminale (final year of lycée or senior high school/sixth form college).

== History ==
The Collège des Frères Mont La Salle (MLS) is located in the Metn coastline. The complex opened its doors on October 10, 1972, to accommodate 1,972 students, from the 4th grade classes to the Terminale (senior high-school), from the 3 colleges of the Brothers of the region: Sacred Heart Gemmayze, Notre-Dame Furn el Chebbak and the Ecole Sainte Marie Beit-Mery.

During the tragic civil war events experienced by Lebanon, the college was targeted by both sides. In October 1991, the school opened the Institute of Electronics, with financial assistance from the European Community. The Collège des Frères Mont La Salle is a school institution founded according to the Lebanese ministerial decree N ° 4004 of September 25, 1972. It is an "open institution" because, while displaying as a Catholic establishment, faithful to its origins, it welcomes the young people from all walks of life and from all faiths. While being trilingual, teaching is rooted particularly in the Arab and French cultures.

The Collège des Frères Mont La Salle is approved by the French Ministry of National Education, Higher Education and Research. Today, it runs all courses up to Lebanese and French baccalaureate, as well as technical education in electronics, computer science and accounting, with 250 teachers and 2,800 students.
