= Michel Daher =

Lebanese entrepreneur

- ميشال ضاهر
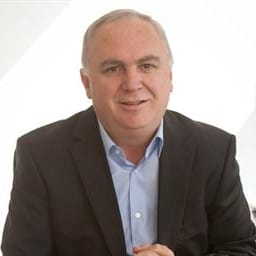
- Born: Michel Georges Daher; 7 March 1961 (age 65); Ferzol, Lebanon
- Occupations: Chairman and CEO
- Known for: Daher Foods, Daher Capital, Parliament of Lebanon
- Political party: Independent (affiliated with the Lebanese Forces)
- Spouse: Marleine Sayde
- Children: Georges, Mark, Edwina, Perla

Michel Georges Daher (Arabic: ميشال ضاهر; born 7 March 1961) is a Lebanese entrepreneur, investor, philanthropist and politician who is the founder of Daher Capital and Daher Foods. As of May 2022, the latest official lebanease elections, he was elected as a Member of Parliament in Lebanon for the Zahle district.

== Early life ==
Daher grew up in Ferzol, Lebanon, where his father was a farmer. He is the eldest of six brothers and sisters. Michel married Marleine Sayde in 1986 and together they have four children, George, Mark, Edwina and Perla.

== Daher Foods ==
Michel Daher founded Daher Foods in 1992, one of the largest Fast-Moving Consumer Goods (FMCG) companies in the Middle East and North Africa (MENA) region. Daher Foods operates one of the largest salty snacks operations in the Middle East.

In 2016, Daher Foods started producing packaged nuts and kernels in a brand new production facility.

In 2019, Daher Foods added biscuits and wafers to its portfolio of products in a brand new production facility.

== Daher Capital ==
Daher founded Daher Capital, a privately owned family investment office. Daher Capital invests in developed public market equities, emerging markets equities, private equity and venture capital.

Some of Daher Capital's publicly known investments include FXCM, where in 2007, Daher Capital joined forces with Lehman Brothers and Yale University to purchase a 35% stake. FXCM went public on the NYSE in December 2010 with a market capitalization of $1.6 billion, a process in which Daher had an active role in. In 2013, Daher sold his FXCM stake and invested in rival Gain Capital.

In 2013, Daher purchased a large stake in the largest poultry producer in the US, Pilgrim's Pride and became the company's second largest shareholder. In 2013, Pilgrim's Pride had revenues of $9.0 billion.

Daher Capital is also known to be a very active Venture Capital investor. In 2017, Daher Capital was recognized as "one of the biggest supporters of Los Angeles tech companies behind the scenes" by the LA Times.

Some of Daher Capital's known VC investments include Maker Studios prior to its sale to Disney for $1 billion, in Bonds.com prior to its sale to the London Stock Exchange, and Burstly, developer of TestFlight, prior to its sale to Apple. In April 2019, Daher Capital worked with BridgePoint Advisers to acquire Kyriba in a deal valuing the company at $1.2 billion.

Other companies that Daher invested in that went public include TrueCar and Stonegate Mortgage.

== Political career ==
Michel Daher expressed concerns on Lebanon's economic model as early as 2012 saying "unless the government embarks on painful austerity measures, Lebanon’s economy will inch closer to the edge of a disaster" in a DailyStar interview at the time.

In 2018, Michel Daher ran for parliament on an economic reform agenda looking to decrease Lebanon's reliance on diaspora remittances and increase the country's productivity, believing the current model was not sustainable.

In May 2018, Michel Daher was elected as an independent to Lebanon's parliament in the Zahle district, one of Lebanon's most contested and competitive areas in parliamentary elections. Daher ran against political dynasties and won by a wide margin. Upon his election, Daher vowed to transfer all salaries and benefits from the state that come during his tenure to the Lebanese Army.

Daher's political positions have revolved around Lebanon's economy, warning against an impending economic collapse if the political establishment did not effect reforms. Lebanon's economy collapsed in October 2019 due to its heavy debt, corruption, reliance on remittances and the banking sector, and lack of productivity.

To mitigate the full effects of the economic collapse, in November 2019 Daher submitted a Capital Control law to parliament as well as the abolishing of Banking Secrecy laws in order to return stolen public funds, both of which were rejected by the existing political establishment.

Daher also serves as a board member of the Association of Lebanese Industrialists (ALI) and was on the Executive Committee of Higher Council for Greek Catholics in Lebanon up until September 2024 when he resigned.
