= Mario Aoun =

Lebanese physician and politician (born 1951)

Minister of Social Affairs
- In office July 2008 – November 2009
- Prime Minister: Fouad Siniora
- Preceded by: Nayla Mouawad
- Succeeded by: Salim Sayegh

Personal details
- Born: 1951 (age 74–75) Damour, Lebanon
- Party: Free Patriotic Movement (until September 2022)
- Education: University of Bordeaux

Mario Aoun (born 1951) is a Lebanese physician and politician. He was a member of the Free Patriotic Movement (FPM) led by Michel Aoun. He was the minister of social affairs between 2008 and 2009.

== Early life and education ==
Aoun was born into a Maronite family in Damour in 1951. He is a graduate of the University of Bordeaux and received a medical degree in endocrinology and metabolic illnesses in 1982.

== Career ==
Aoun was the chief of service at Lebanese Hospital in Jeitawi in 2004. He also worked at St. Charles Hospital in 2004. In addition, he was FPM's coordinator in Damour. Later he became the first FPM head of the Lebanese Order of Physicians on 31 May 2004. He served there until 2007. In July 2008, Aoun was appointed minister of social affairs to the cabinet led by Prime Minister Fouad Siniora and replaced Nayla Mouawad in the post. Aoun ran for a seat from the Chouf district in the general elections of 2009, but he could not win the election. Aoun's tenure as social affairs minister ended in November 2009, and he was succeeded by Salim Sayegh in the aforementioned post.

In the 2018 elections Aoun won one of the Maronite seats in the Chouf District within the electoral district of Mount Lebanon IV. On 10 September 2022, he resigned from the FPM because of his clash with Gebran Bassil.

Political offices
Preceded by Nayla Mouawad	Minister of Social Affairs; 2008 – 2009	Succeeded by Salim Sayegh
