= Elias Bou Saab =

Lebanese politician (born 1967)

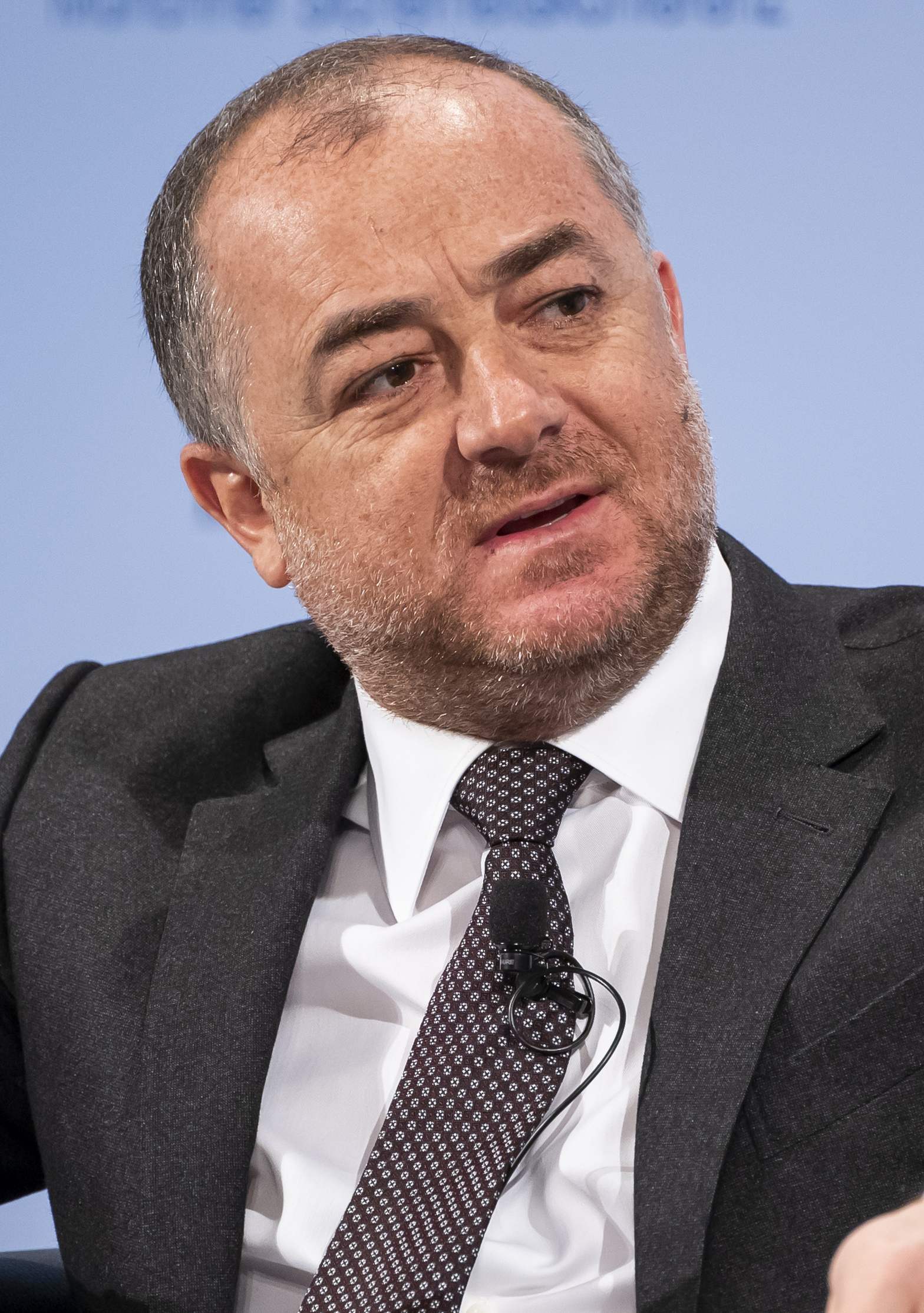
- Bou Saab in 2019

Deputy Speaker of the Parliament of Lebanon
- Incumbent
- Assumed office 31 May 2022
- Speaker: Nabih Berri
- Preceded by: Elie Ferzli

Member of the Lebanese Parliament
- Incumbent
- Assumed office 15 May 2018
- Constituency: Metn District

Minister of National Defense
- In office 31 January 2019 – 21 January 2020
- Prime Minister: Saad Hariri
- Preceded by: Yaacoub Sarraf
- Succeeded by: Zeina Akar

Minister of Education
- In office 15 February 2014 – 19 December 2016
- Prime Minister: Tammam Salam
- Preceded by: Hassan Diab
- Succeeded by: Marwan Hamadeh

Personal details
- Born: Elias Nicolas Bou Saab; 8 September 1967 (age 59) Dhour El Choueir, Matn, Lebanon
- Party: Free Patriotic Movement (until 2024); Independent (2024–present)
- Spouse: Julia Boutros
- Children: 2

Elias Nicolas Bou Saab (Arabic: إلياس نقولا بو صعب, romanized: Ilyās Niqūlā Bū Ṣaʿb; born 8 September 1967) is a Lebanese politician. He was a Minister of National Defense, Advisor to the President of Lebanon Michel Aoun on International Cooperation. He was elected Deputy speaker of the Lebanese parliament on May 31, 2022. He was also a member of the founding board of directors of television station OTV.

== Early life ==
Elias Bou Saab was born in Dhour El Choueir, located in the Matn region of Mount Lebanon, to Nicolas Bou Saab and Janette Owayjan.

He attended St. Joseph School in Cornet Chahwan from 1971 till 1987. After graduating from high school, Elias traveled to the United Kingdom to attend The American College in London to receive his Bachelor of Business Administration in Marketing, where he was elected twice President of the Student Government Association. He later received his Masters of Arts in International Relations from Boston University in the spring of 1994.

In 1992, he founded the Lebanese Graduates of Britain (LGB) and served as its first president.

== Career ==
Elias Bou Saab founded the American University in Dubai in 1995. He is the Executive Vice President and has overseen the university's development into one of the premier institutions of higher education in the region. Bou Saab has developed several scholarship programs at AUD.

He has been an active member of the Clinton Global Initiative since its inception in 2005. He created a scholarship program in President Bill Clinton's name to provide U.S. students the opportunity to study in the Middle East. These programs have received great support from Sheikh Mohammed Bin Rashid Al Maktoum, Vice President and Prime Minister of the United Arab Emirates, Ruler of Dubai. He was a member of the founding board of directors of television station OTV, Al Mada.org news site, Fame Fm and Sawt El Mada radio station, which are the broadcasting channels of the Free Patriotic Movement. He is also the co-founder of the Emirati Lebanese Friendship Association and a former member of the Board of Directors of the Young Arab Leaders.

== Political career ==
In 2010, Bou Saab was elected President of the municipality to his native village of Dhour El Choueir. He was able to raise the quality of living for the people of his village through achievements such as providing running electricity, water, and reviving the Famous Immigrant Festival of Dhour El Choueir.

In February 2014, Bou Saab was named Minister of Education and Higher Education in Lebanon, one of the two representatives of Michel Aoun's Free Patriotic Movement in the Tammam Salam's government. . As Minister of Education, Bou Saab was in charge of overseeing the Lebanese education system and addressing the pressing challenges created by the influx of Syrian refugees that has nearly doubled the student population in Lebanon. Bou Saab called on the international community to help resolve the humanitarian crisis in Lebanon. He proposed five action plans: creating an emergency support office in the Ministry of Education, rehabilitating existing schools and establishing new schools, incorporating all education activities under the formal education system, improving the quality of public schools, and strengthening the national education system. The plan will be implemented with international support from Global institutions such as the United Nations Special Envoy for Global Education, UNICEF, UNCHR, the World Bank, DFID, and USAID. In March 2017, the President of Lebanon Michel Aoun appointed Bou Saab as his advisor on International Cooperation. he was elected in May 2018 as member of the Lebanese Parliament representing Metn District on "Strong Metn" List. Since then, he is a member of the Free Patriotic Movement.

He was then elected Deputy Speaker of the Lebanese Parliament succeeding Elie Ferzli following the 2022 elections amid the ongoing economic crisis. Bou Saab was able to win by a slim margin of 50.78% of the vote after a 2-round vote took place.

Bou Saab was reportedly kicked out of the Free Patriotic Movement bloc in April 2024 in which FPM sources cited political disagreements since the beginning of the 2022 parliament. Disagreements mostly include choice of presidential candidates and ideological differences. Together with three other former FPM members the Independent Consultative Gathering was formed.

== Personal life ==
He is married to the renowned singer Julia Boutros and has two sons, Samer and Tarek.
