= Hagop Pakradounian =

Lebanese-Armenian MP

Hagop Pakradounian (Armenian: Յակոբ Բագրատունեան, Arabic: هاغوب بقرادونيان), originally Hagop Pakradouni is a Lebanese politician of Armenian descent, and former leader of the Armenian Revolutionary Federation in Lebanon.

Hagop Pakradounian was born as Hagop Pakradouni in Beirut, in 1956. Pakradounian, who has a degree in political science, is the current Member of Parliament representing the Armenian Revolutionary Federation in the Lebanese Parliament from the Metn Region. He was a candidate in the legislative elections of 2000 for the Armenian Apostolic seat in Beirut but lost against candidates backed by former Prime Minister of Lebanon Rafik Hariri.

In the 2005 parliamentary elections, Hagop Pakradounian was elected a member of the 2005 Lebanese Parliament from the Metn region. He was on the list of the alliance between the Free Patriotic Movement of general Michel Aoun and former Lebanese Deputy Prime Minister Michel Murr.

In August 2007, Hagop Pakradounian as the leader of the Dashnaktsutyun (Armenian Revolutionary Federation) demanded a public apology from Phalange leader Amine Gemayel and politician Gabriel Murr for their controversial comments on the Armenian community of Lebanon and the ARF. Gemayel and Murr had claimed that the ARF participated in vote rigging during the Metn by-elections. Gemayel also said that he had fared better "among Christians", and accused the ARF of trying to "impose its will on the people of Metn".

Pakradounian was elected unopposed deputy of the Metn electoral district in 2009. He is nominated as general secretary of the Tashnag party in Lebanon in 2015. He now holds a seat in the Metn region as of the 2022 Lebanese General Elections.
