= Chamel Roukoz =

Lebanese military officer and politician

Chamel Roukoz شامل روكز
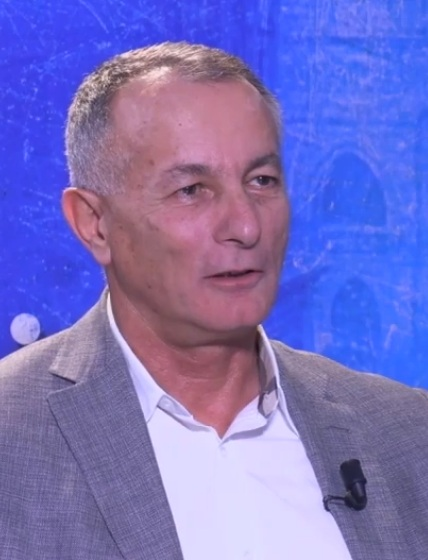
- Roukoz, 10 August 2020
- Born: September 8, 1958 (age 68); Chatine, Batroun District, Lebanon
- Military career
- Allegiance: Lebanon
- Branch: Lebanese Ground Forces
- Service years: 1981–2015
- Rank: Brigadier General
- Unit: Lebanese Rangers Regiment
- Commands: Commander of the Lebanese Rangers Regiment
- Conflicts: Lebanese Civil War; Operation Dinnieh; 2007 Lebanon conflict; Syrian Civil War spillover in Lebanon; Battle of Sidon; Battle of Arsal

Chamel Roukoz (Arabic: شامل روكز; born 8 September 1958) is a Lebanese former military officer, politician and former member of parliament. From May 2018 to 2022, he was a member of parliament who represented the Byblos–Keserwan district. Before retiring, Roukoz was the oldest commander of the Rangers Regiment and was spoken of as a potential candidate for the post of Lebanese Armed Forces Commander.

== Military career ==
During the final phases of the Lebanese Civil War, under the leadership of Prime Minister General Aoun, Roukoz fought the Syrian forces and the Lebanese Forces. During Summer 2007, he gained recognition as a brilliant Officer during the 15-week operation against Fatah al-Islam in Nahr al-Bared camp in northern Lebanon. In addition, General Roukoz, fought Ahmed al-Assir and his supporters during the Battle of Sidon in 2013. He also led battles and operations against Jabhat al-Nusra and ISIL during the Syrian Civil War's spillover in Lebanon in the Battle of Arsal and Battle of Ras Baalbak.

== Awards ==
For his distinguished military achievements. General Roukoz awarded the National Order of Merit (Officer) by the President of France as well as the Order of Charles III Encomienda de Número (Commander by Number) by the king of Spain.

== Civil–Rangers relations ==
According to Roukoz, the Lebanese people support is the strongest weapon to the Army. Thus, every year since 2008, the Rangers Regiment organizes unique mountain races open to both the military and civilians. Barracks to Barracks is the longest race with a participation of thousands of people from different nationalities. The races have also ecological and touristic goals. See Rangers Events.

== Personal life ==
Roukoz was married to Claudine, daughter of the Lebanese President Michel Aoun until they divorced in 2022. They have two sons.
