= Parliament of Lebanon =

Legislature of Lebanon

Coordinates: 33°53′48.39″N 35°30′13.69″E

Lebanese Chamber of Deputies مجلس النواب اللبناني

Type
- Type: Unicameral (de facto); Bicameral (de jure)

Leadership
- Speaker: Nabih Berri, Amal Movement since 28 October 1992
- Deputy Speaker: Elias Bou Saab, Independent since 31 May 2022
- Secretaries: Alain Aoun, Independent; Hadi Aboul Hosn, PSP since 31 May 2022
- Cabinet: (24 Ministers): LF (4); PSP (2); Amal (2); Hezbollah (2); Kataeb (1); ARF (1); IND (12) (Note: Technocrats/Presidential Share)

Structure
- Seats: 128
- Political groups: Government (64): Strong Republic (19) (Note: LF (14); NLP (1); Independent (4)); Loyalty to the Resistance (15) (Note: Hezbollah (13); Independent (2)); Development and Liberation (15) (Note: Amal (11); National Banner (1); Independent (3)); Democratic Gathering (8) (Note: PSP (6); Independent (2)); Kataeb (5) (Note: Kateab (4); Independent (1)); Armenian Revolutionary Federation (2); Supported by (46): Forces of Change (8) (Note: Taqaddum (1); Tahalof Watani (1); Mada (1); Lana (1); Independent (4)); National Moderation (6) (Note: Independent (5)); National Compatibility (5) (Note: Al-Ahbash (2); UP (1); DM (1); Independent (1)); Independent Consultative Gathering (4) (Note: Independent (4)); Independent National Bloc (3) (Note: MM (1); Independent (2)); Human Homeland Project (3) (Note: Project Watan (2); Independent (1)); Renewal (3) (Note: Al Haraka (1); NDP (1); Sanad Movement (1)); Change Alliance Bloc (3) (Note: Khatt Ahmar (1); Taqaddum (1); Independent (1)); Popular Nasserist Organization (1); Independent (11); Opposition (17): Strong Lebanon (13) (Note: FPM (12); Independent (1)); ReLebanon (1) (Note: Faction of Forces of Change.); Islamic Group (1); Independent (2); Vacant (1)

Elections
- Voting system: Party list proportional representation with seats allocated by religion
- First election: 4 September 1943
- Last election: 15 May 2022
- Next election: May 2028

Meeting place
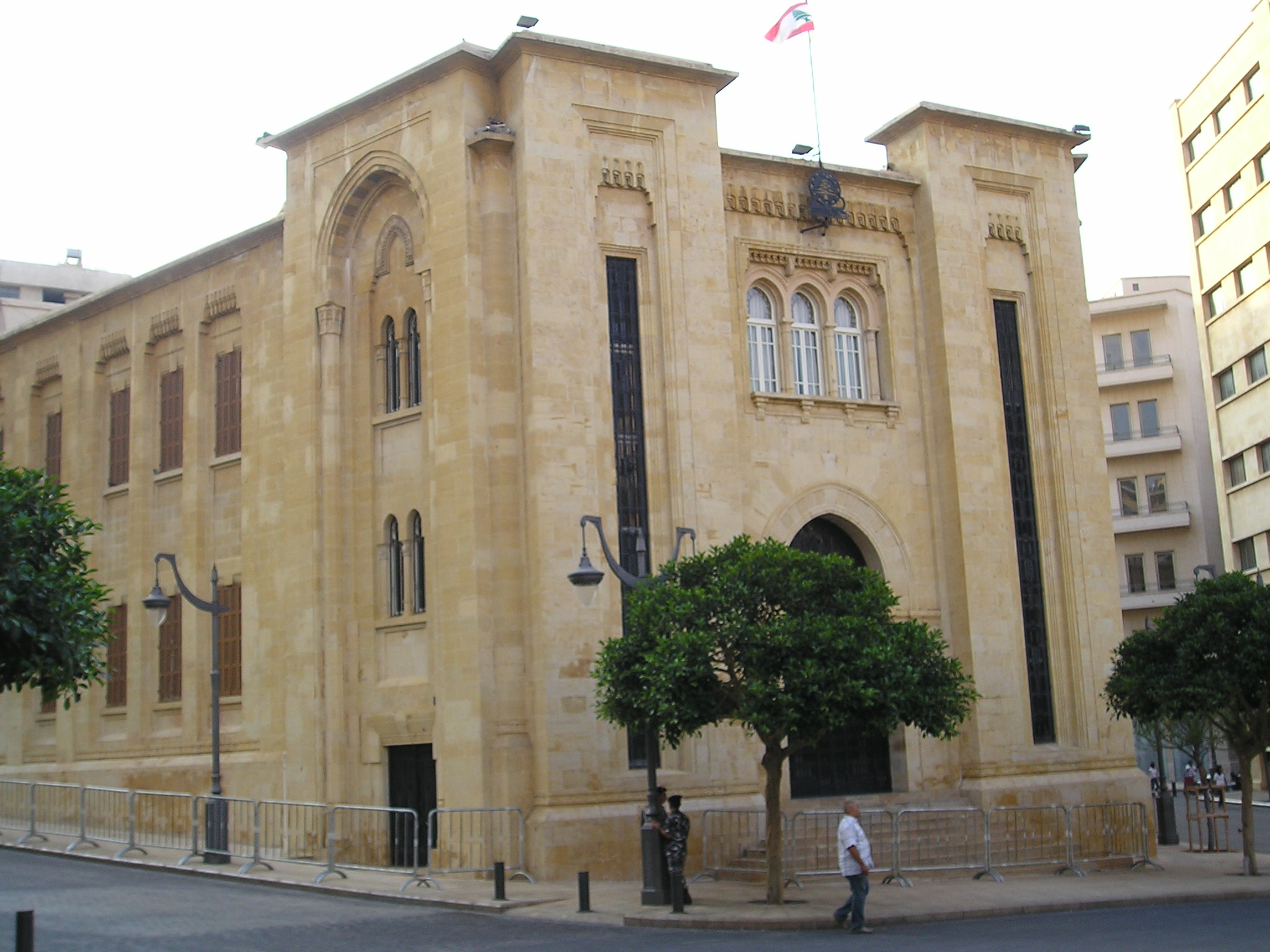
- Lebanese Parliament, Beirut, Lebanon

Website
- www.lp.gov.lb

Constitution
- Constitution of Lebanon, Chapter II, Article 22

Footnotes

The Lebanese Parliament (Arabic: مجلس النواب, romanized: Majlis an-Nuwwab, lit. 'Chamber of Deputies') is the de facto unicameral national legislature of the Lebanese Republic. According to Article 22 of the Constitution of Lebanon, amended after the Taif Agreement, this chamber, known as the Chamber of Deputies, is the de jure lower house of the Parliament which elects members on a non-sectarian basis while the Senate is the de jure upper house that elects its religious representatives on a sectarian basis as written in the National Pact.

There are 128 members elected to a four-year term in multi-member constituencies, apportioned among Lebanon's diverse Christian and Muslim denominations but with half of the seats reserved for Christians and half for Muslims per Constitutional Article 24. Lebanon has universal adult suffrage. The parliament's major functions are to elect the President of the republic, to approve the government (although appointed by the President, the Prime Minister, along with the Cabinet, must retain the confidence of a majority in the Parliament), and to approve laws and expenditure.

The Parliament was most recently elected on 15 May 2022. While terms are four years long, parliaments can extend their own terms: the parliament elected in June 2009 did so on three occasions, delaying the next election until May 2018 while a new electoral law was prepared. According to the Lebanese constitution and the electoral law of 2017, elections are held on a Sunday during the 60 days preceding the end of the sitting parliament's mandate, with the next one due in May 2028.

== Allocation of seats ==
A unique feature of the Lebanese system is the principle of "confessional distribution": each religious community has an allotted number of deputies in the Parliament in a form of consociationalism.

In elections held between 1932 and 1972, seats were apportioned between Christians and Muslims in a 6:5 ratio, with various denominations of the two faiths allocated representation roughly proportional to their size. By the 1960s, Muslims had become openly dissatisfied with this system, aware that their own higher birthrate and the higher emigration rate among Christians had by this time almost certainly produced a Muslim majority, which the parliamentary distribution did not reflect. Christian politicians were unwilling to abolish or alter the system, however, and it was one of the factors in the 1975–1990 civil war. The Taif Agreement of 1989, which ended the civil war, reapportioned the Parliament to provide for equal representation of Christians and Muslims, with each electing 64 of the 128 deputies.

Although distributed confessionally, all members, regardless of their religious faith, are elected by universal suffrage, forcing politicians to seek support from outside of their own religious communities, unless their co-religionists overwhelmingly dominate their particular constituency.

The changes stipulated by the Taif Agreement of 1989 are set out in the table below:

Parliament of Lebanon seat allocation
Confession	Before Taif	After Taif
Maronite Catholic	30	34
Eastern Orthodox	11	14
Melkite Catholic	6	8
Armenian Orthodox	4	5
Armenian Catholic	1	1
Protestant	1	1
Other Christian minorities	1	1
Total Christians	54	64
Sunni	20	27
Shi'ite	19	27
Alawite	0	2
Druze	6	8
Total Muslims + Druze	45	64
Total	99	128

Electoral district under the 2017 Election Law	Seats	Sunni	Shia	Druze	Alawite	Maronite	Greek Orthodox	Greek Catholic	Armenian Orthodox	Armenian Catholic	Protestant	Minorities
Beirut I (East Beirut)	8					1	1	1	3	1		1
Beirut II (West Beirut)	11	6	2	1			1				1	
Bekaa I (Zahle)	7	1	1			1	1	2	1			
Bekaa II (West Bekaa-Rachaya)	6	2	1	1		1	1					
Bekaa III (Baalbek-Hermel)	10	2	6			1		1				
Mount Lebanon I (Byblos-Kesrwan)	8		1			7						
Mount Lebanon II (Metn)	8					4	2	1	1			
Mount Lebanon III (Baabda)	6		2	1		3						
Mount Lebanon IV (Aley-Chouf)	13	2		4		5	1	1				
North I (Akkar)	7	3			1	1	2					
North II (Tripoli-Minnieh-Dennieh)	11	8			1	1	1					
North III (Bcharre-Zghorta-Batroun-Koura)	10					7	3					
South I (Saida-Jezzine)	5	2				2		1				
South II (Zahrany-Tyre)	7		6					1				
South III (Marjaayoun-Nabatieh-Hasbaya-Bint Jbeil)	11	1	8	1			1					
Total	128	27	27	8	2	34	14	8	5	1	1	1
Source: 961News

== Political parties ==
Numerous political parties exist in Lebanon. Many parties are little more than ad hoc electoral lists, formed by negotiation among influential local figures representing the various confessional communities; these lists usually function only for the election, and do not form identifiable groupings in the parliament subsequently. Other parties are personality-based, often comprising followers of a present or past political leader or warlord. Few parties are based, in practice, on any particular ideology, although in theory most claim to be.

No single party has ever won more than 12.5 percent of the total number of seats in the Parliament, and until 2005, no coalition ever won more than a third of the total. The general election held in 2005, however, resulted in a clear majority (72 seats out of 128) being won by the alliance led by Saad Hariri (son of murdered former Prime Minister Rafik Hariri); half of these were held by Hariri's own Future Movement.

== Speaker ==
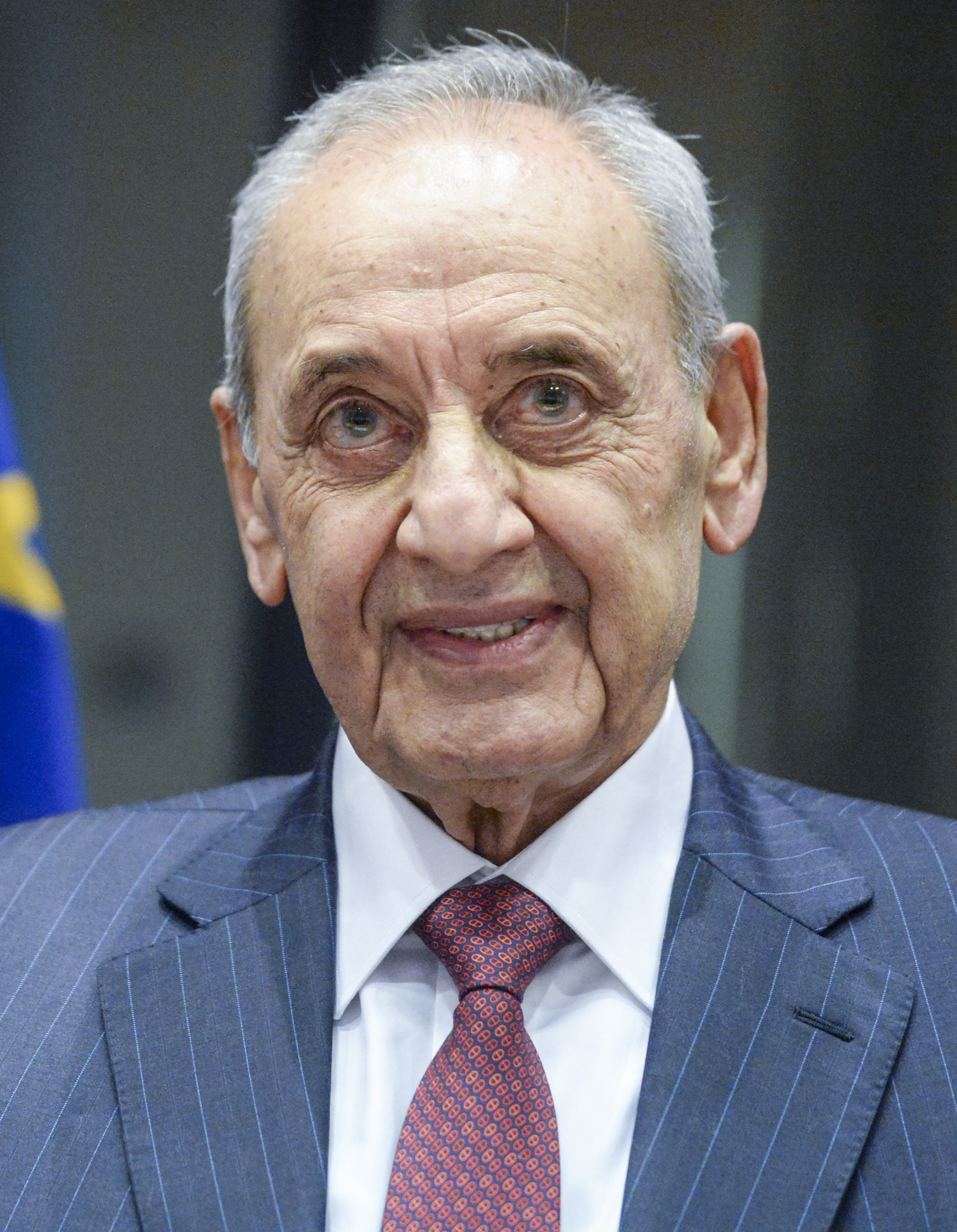
Nabih Berri, incumbent speaker

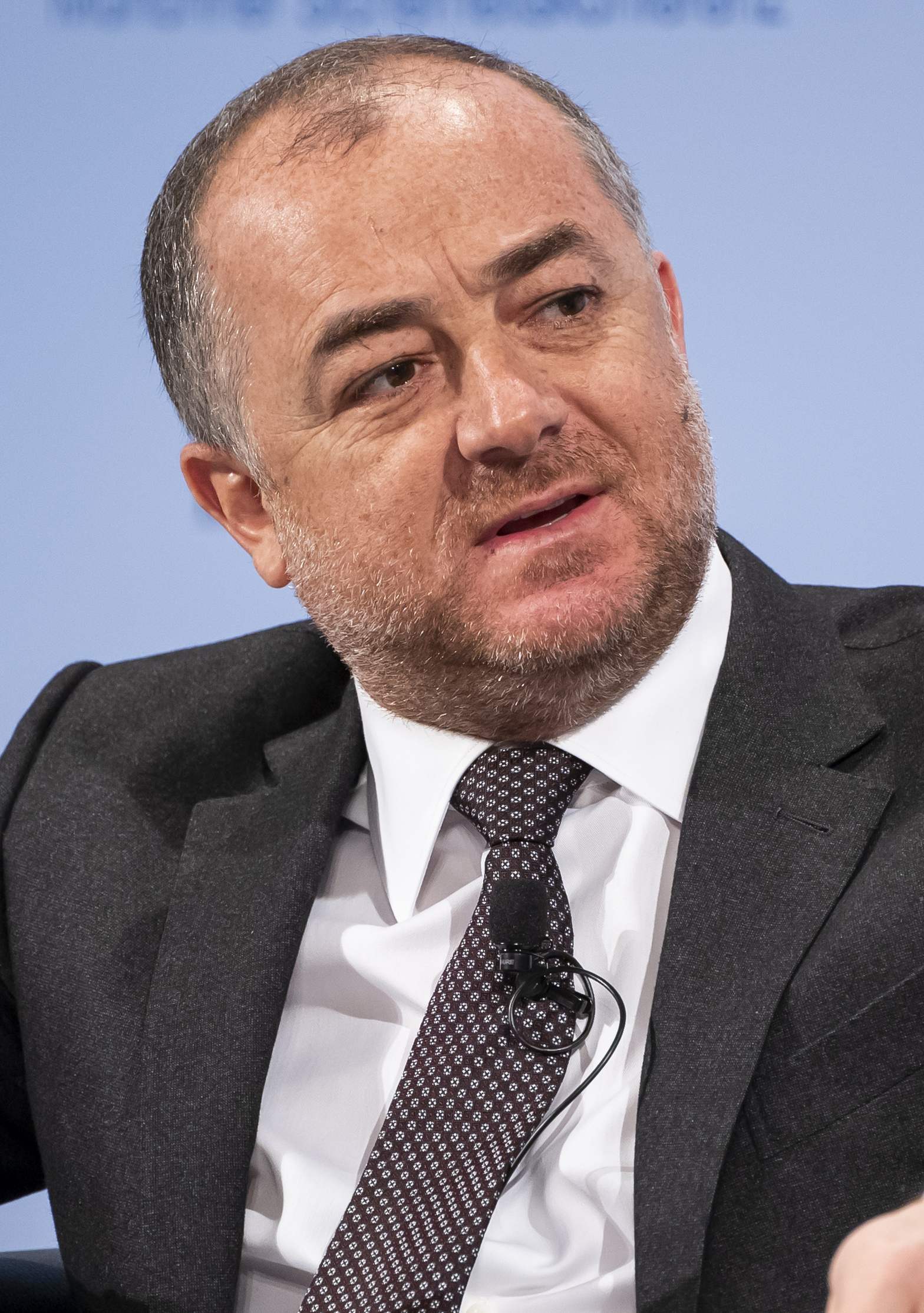
Elias Bou Saab, incumbent deputy speaker

The Speaker of the Parliament, who by custom must be a Shi'a Muslim, is now elected to a four-year term, and is the highest office in the parliament. Prior to the Taif Agreement, they were elected to a two-year term. They form part of a "troika", together with the President (required to be a Maronite Christian) and the Prime Minister (a Sunni Muslim). The privileges of the Speaker are unusually powerful, relative to other democratic systems. The current speaker is the leader of the Amal Party, Nabih Berri.

=== Deputy Speaker ===
The Deputy Speaker of the Parliament of Lebanon is the second-highest-ranking official of the Lebanese Parliament. The office is always attributed to a Greek Orthodox practitioner.

== Parliamentary committees ==
The Lebanese parliament has sixteen committees to facilitate the legislative process and provide oversight on specific areas of government policy. The Finance and Budget Committee is considered the most important, as it reviews the government's budget and spending plans. Other influential committees include Administration and Justice, Health and Labor, and Economy and Industry.

List of committees:

- Administration and Justice Committee (Chairman: Georges Adwan - LF)
- Finance and Budget Committee (Chairman: Ibrahim Kanaan - FPM)
- Foreign and Expatriate Affairs Committee (Chairman: Fadi Alameh - Amal Movement)
- Public Works and Energy Committee (Chairman: Sajeeh Ateya - Independent)
- Education and Culture Committee (Chairman: Hassan Mrad - Union Party)
- Public Health, Labor, and Social Affairs Committee (Chairman: Bilal Abdullah - PSP)
- Defense, Interior, and Municipal Affairs Committee (Chairman: Jihad Al Samad - Independent)
- Displaced Affairs Committee (Chairman: Hagop Pakradounian - Tashnag)
- Agriculture and Tourism Committee (Chairman: Ayoub Hmayed - Amal Movement)
- Environment Committee (Chairman: Ghayyath Yazbek - Lebanese Forces)
- Economy, Industry, and Planning Committee (Chairman: Michel Daher - Independent)
- Media and Telecommunications Committee (Chairman: Ibrahim Al Moussawi - Hezbollah)
- Youth and Sports Committee (Chairman: Simon Abi Ramia - Independent)
- Human Rights Committee (Chairman: Michel Moussa - Amal Movement)
- Women and Children Committee (Chairman: Inaya Ezzedine - Amal Movement)
- Information Technology Committee (Chairman: Tony Frangieh - Marada)

== Electoral system ==
According to the Lebanese constitution and the electoral law of 2017, elections are held on a Sunday during the 60 days preceding the end of the sitting parliament's mandate. In June 2017, a new electoral law was passed. While in the previous system, the 128 members of parliament were elected from 26 multi-member constituencies under plurality block voting, and the candidates with the highest number of votes within each religious community were elected, the new electoral law instituted proportional representation in 15 multi-member constituencies while still maintaining the confessional distribution. However, the 7 out of the 15 of the electoral districts are divided into 2 or more 'minor districts' (largely corresponding to the smaller electoral districts from the old electoral law). Where applicable, preference vote is counted on the 'minor district' level.

== Parliament building ==
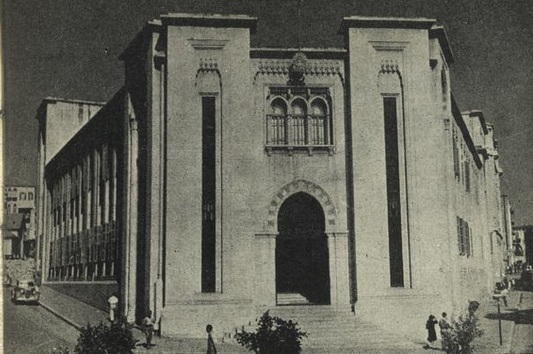
Lebanese Parliament Building 1947

The Parliament building was designed by Mardiros Altounian, who was also the architect of the Étoile clock tower. The building was completed in 1934 during the French Mandate period. Advised to build in the spirit of Lebanese tradition, the architect visited the Emirs' palaces in the Chouf Mountains. He also drew inspiration from the Oriental styles developed in Paris, Istanbul, and Cairo at the turn of the 20th century.

== See also ==
- Members of the 2009-2013 Lebanese Parliament
- Members of the 2005-2009 Lebanese Parliament
- Politics of Lebanon
- List of legislatures by country
