= Gebran Bassil =

Lebanese politician (born 1970)

- جبران باسيل
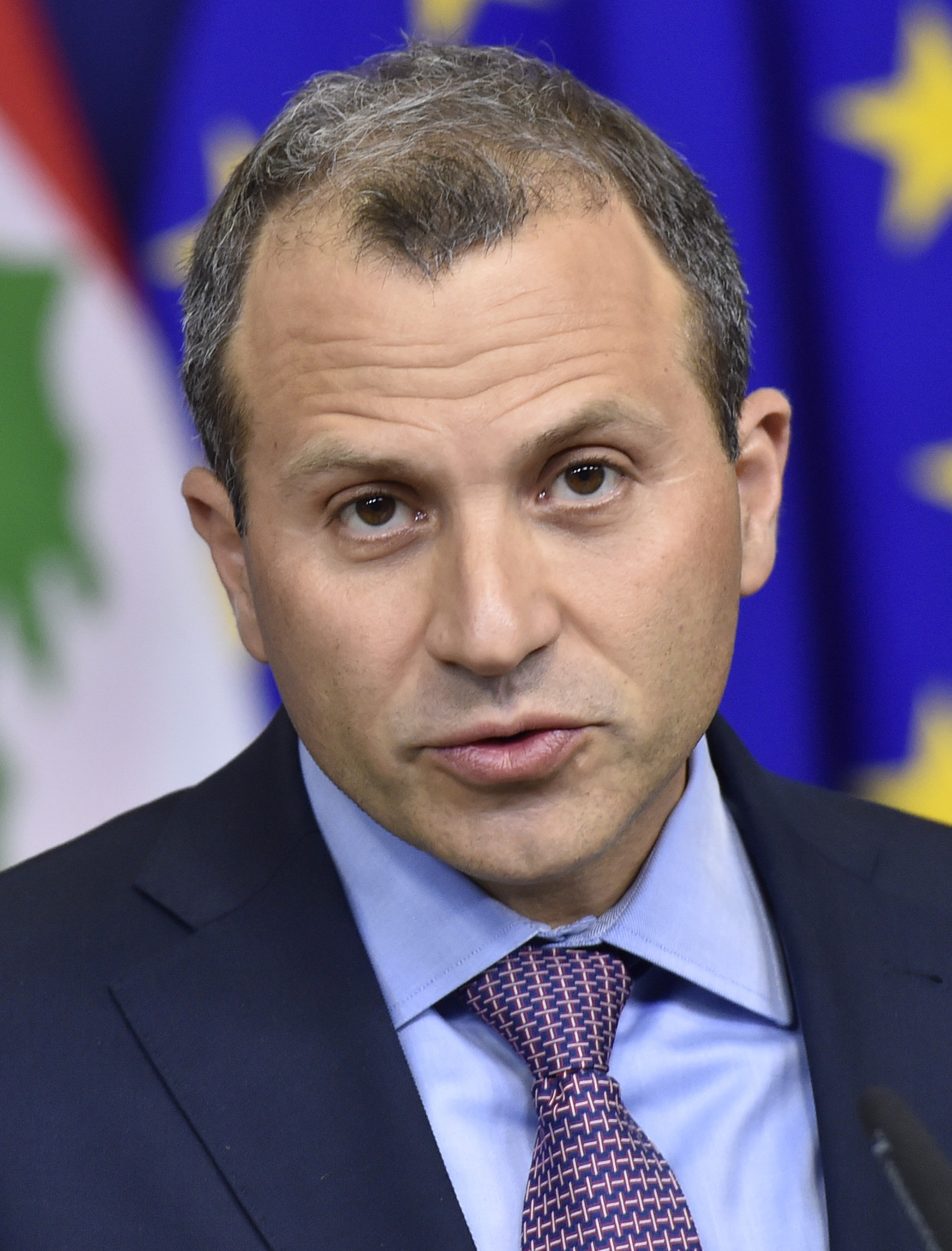
- Bassil in 2016

Member of Lebanese Parliament
- Incumbent
- Assumed office 6 May 2018
- Preceded by: Boutros Harb
- Constituency: Batroun

Minister of Foreign Affairs and Emigrants
- In office 15 February 2014 – 21 January 2020
- Prime Minister: Tammam Salam; Saad Hariri
- Preceded by: Adnan Mansour
- Succeeded by: Nassif Hitti

Minister of Energy and Water
- In office 9 November 2009 – 15 February 2014
- Prime Minister: Saad Hariri
- Preceded by: Alain Tabourian
- Succeeded by: Arthur Nazarian

Minister of Telecommunications
- In office 11 July 2008 – 9 November 2009
- Prime Minister: Fouad Siniora
- Preceded by: Marwan Hamadeh
- Succeeded by: Charbel Nahas

Personal details
- Born: Gebran Gerge Bassil; 21 June 1970 (age 56) Batroun, Lebanon
- Party: FPM
- Spouse: Chantal Aoun (m. 1999)
- Children: 3
- Relatives: Michel Aoun; (father-in-law)
- Education: American University of Beirut (BE)

Gebran Gerge Bassil (Arabic: جبران جرجي باسيل; born 21 June 1970) is a Lebanese politician who is the leader of the Free Patriotic Movement since 2015 and leader of the Strong Lebanon bloc in the Lebanese parliament since 2018. A Maronite Christian, he is the son-in-law of former president Michel Aoun, and has been his most senior advisor since 2005.

Born in Batroun, Bassil joined the FPM, becoming a prominent activist in it. He ran in the general election of 2005 and 2009, and was appointed the Minister of Telecommunications in the First Cabinet of Saad Hariri. In 2011, Bassil and all ministers of the opposition announced their resignation, leading to the collapse of the government.

He subsequently held the position of Minister of Energy and Water between 2011 and 2014, as well as the Minister of Foreign Affairs and Emigrants from 2014 to 2020. He won a parliamentary seat for Batroun district and the Maronite sect in the general election in 2018. He was highly targeted in the widespread Lebanese protests which began by the end of 2019.

Bassil remains a controversial figure in the country. He is accused of being corrupt, racist and allowing nepotism, and was labeled the "most hated man in Lebanon". These claims are denied by Bassil, stating that they are part of a wider character assassination plot. He was sanctioned by the United States under the Magnitsky Act.

In October 2024, Gebran Bassil claimed that the Free Patriotic Movement was no longer in alliance with Hezbollah.

== Early life ==
Bassil was born into a Maronite Christian family. He received a bachelor's degree and a master's degree in civil engineering from the American University of Beirut in 1992 and 1993 respectively. He was a member of a number of associations: the Lebanese Red Cross and Rotary Club of Batroun, Lebanon.

== Political career ==
Between the years of 1998 and 2005, Bassil was an activist in various positions in the Free Patriotic Movement. In 2005, he became a candidate in the general elections in the district of Batroun but did not succeed in being elected. From 2005 to 2008, Bassil was head of the Free Patriotic Movement.

He served as the Minister of telecommunications in the Lebanese cabinet led by Fouad Siniora from May 2008 to June 2009, and then as the minister of energy in the cabinet headed by Saad Hariri Bassil lost the general elections held in 2009.

=== Collapse of government in 2011 ===
On 12 January 2011, the government collapsed after Bassil announced that all ten opposition ministers had resigned following months of warnings by Hezbollah that it would not remain inactive should there be indictments against the group. The New York Times suggested the resignations came after the collapse of talks between Syria and Saudi Arabia to ease tensions in Lebanon.

=== Minister of Energy and Water and Foreign Affairs and Emigrants ===
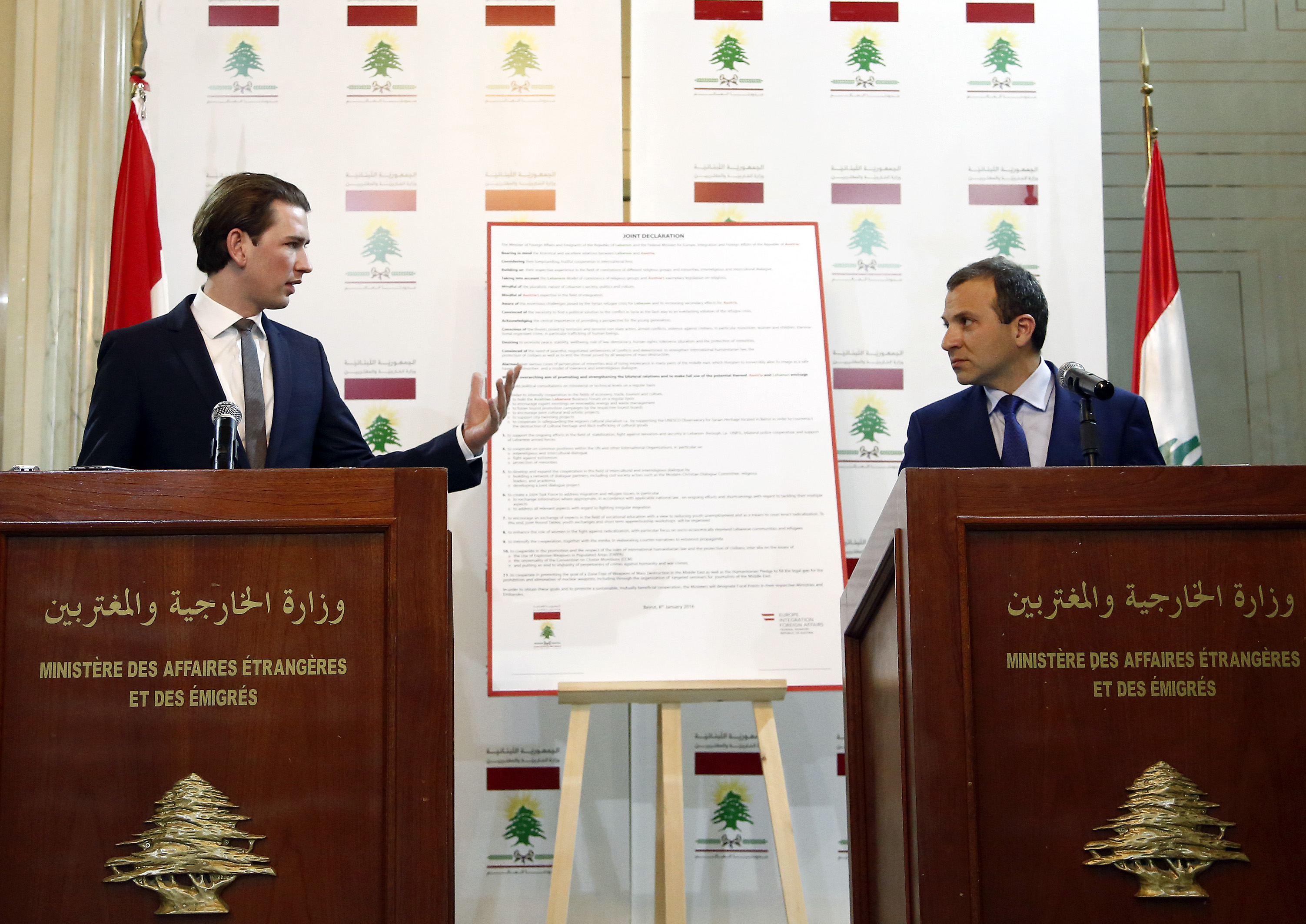
Bassil with then Austrian Foreign Minister Sebastian Kurz, 2016

He served as the Minister of Energy and Water in the cabinet headed by Najib Mikati since June 2011, and assumed the role of Minister of Foreign Affairs and Emigrants as of February 2014. In the general election of 2018, Bassil was elected as a Member of Parliament (MP) for the North III district.

During his tenure as the Minister of Energy and Water, he promised to provide electricity 24-hours a day; hence, he officiated a campaign to explore offshore oil and gas in the Eastern Mediterranean, and to generate power by floating electricity-generating turbines off the Lebanese coast through Turkish company Karpowership. However, the plan did not realize due to the continuous political disagreements in Lebanon.

=== 2017 Lebanon–Saudi Arabia dispute ===
Lebanon's president Aoun and some Lebanese officials including Bassil believed that the abrupt resignation of Prime Minister Saad Hariri was made under coercion by Saudis and have claimed that the Saudis have kept him hostage.

This led Bassil to visit multiple European countries and meet with senior EU leaders to rally diplomatic support for Lebanon and its stability. During his European tour, he met with EU's High Representative and Vice-President of the Commission Federica Mogherini in Brussels, Turkish President Recep Tayyip Erdoğan and Minister of Foreign Affairs Mevlüt Çavuşoğlu, German FM Sigmar Gabriel, Russian FM Sergei Lavrov and French President Emmanuel Macron.

=== Lebanon Protests ===
On 3 November 2019, thousands of Lebanese Free Patriotic Movement supporters attended a protest in support of President Michel Aoun, the founder of the party. During the protest, FPM leader Gebran Bassil made a personal statement for the first time in over 13 days. Bassil claimed "We should block roads for MPs who refuse corruption-combating laws, politicians who escape accountability and judges who do not implement the law." He also demanded lifting banking secrecy on political officials' accounts and insisting accountability, as well as a return of misused or stolen public funds.

According to France 24, In light of this week's World Economic Forum, the expected participation of Lebanon's outgoing foreign minister Gebran Bassil triggered a strong public protest, demanding the cancellation of his invitation. However, Bassil maintains that the protesters who chanted against him do not make up the majority of Lebanese and that he believes the people of Lebanon want change, but he argued that he's not leaving until voters drive him out in elections, according to The Washington Post. The former foreign minister further claimed that he came to Davos "on his own expenses".

==== United States Sanctions ====
On 6 November 2020, the United States Trump administration imposed sanctions on Bassil under the Global Magnitsky Human Rights Accountability Act over "systemic corruption" and ties with the Shia movement Hezbollah under Executive Order E.O. 13818. A senior U.S. official said Bassil's support for Hezbollah was "every bit of the motivation" for targeting him for sanctions. The sanctions froze all of his assets in the U.S. as well as his bank accounts in U.S. dollars. Private sector banks and U.S.-based businesses are prohibited to do business with him. He was denied access to the United States and may encounter problems getting a Schengen visa.

After the announcement, Bassil tweeted that he was "neither frightened by the sanctions nor tempted by the promises". President Michel Aoun assigned his foreign minister Charbel Wehbe to contact the United States in order to obtain evidence or necessary to take the necessary legal measures against Bassil.

In a televised speech Bassil slammed the sanctions as unjust and politically motivated, mainly for his refusal to break ties with Hezbollah. He also added that he joined the government as Foreign Minister to take advantage of diplomatic immunity, and congratulated Joe Biden for his win in the 2020 presidential election. Bassil's supporters gathered in front of his house, expressing their solidarity and sympathy for him.

The US ambassador to Lebanon Dorothy Shea suggested that Bassil "expressed willingness to break with Hezbollah on certain conditions", and that the sanctions are targeting Bassil and not the Free Patriotic Movement. This was later denied by Bassil.

== Personal life ==
Bassil and his wife Chantal Michel Aoun have three children. His father-in-law is the former Lebanese president Michel Aoun, the former leader and founder of the Free Patriotic Movement. On 27 September 2020, Bassil's party said he was infected with a "mild" case of COVID-19 as cases surged throughout Lebanon.

== Controversies ==
=== Comments on Israel ===
Bassil was criticized by many Lebanese politicians after an interview in December 2017 with Al-Mayadeen in which he stated that Lebanon does not have an ideological problem with Israel.

He also said in that interview that he was not against Israel "living in security".

However, he has been an advocate for the return of Shebaa Farms, Kfarchouba Hills and the northern part of Ghajar, to be under the Lebanese authority.

=== Dispute with Speaker of Parliament ===
In January 2018, Bassil was recorded in a private meeting calling the Speaker of Parliament, Nabih Berri, a "thug". In the leaked footage, Bassil accused Berri of urging Shiite businessmen to boycott a diaspora conference organized by the Foreign Ministry in Abidjan.

=== Proposed citizenship changes ===
In March 2018, Bassil proposed amending Lebanese naturalization laws to allow citizenship to be passed from mothers onto their children. The bill drew criticism for not applying to women in marriages with men from neighbouring countries which activists argue is a violation of their rights.

=== Lobbying in the United States ===
In July 2019, a document was published, in which a consultant, Mario LaSala, mentioned that he worked on lobbying meetings between Bassil and American senators.

=== Comments on foreign residents ===
In 2019, many users on social media, including renowned journalists, actors and politicians criticized Bassil for several tweets which targeted the foreign residents and labour force in Lebanon, such as:

We will not be replaced in this land which bore prophets and saints; Not a refugee, nor a displaced (person), nor a corrupt (person).

—

It is normal to defend the Lebanese labour force against any other foreign labour, whether it be Syrian, Palestinian, French, Saudi, Iranian or American, the Lebanese come first!

—

=== Involvement in the rhetoric of Lebanese protests ===
In late 2019, Bassil became the subject of a popular Lebanese-language chant in the Lebanese protests. The chant was oppositional in nature, due to Bassil's close association to his father-in-law, Lebanese president Michel Aoun, as well as the public perception that Bassil profited politically by taking advantage of the country's sectarian divisions. The lyrics to the chant, which was sung as a short melody, went as follows:

Hela, Hela, Hela Hela Ho, Gibran Bassil kes emmo

—

These explicit lyrics curse Bassil with a vulgar reference to his mother's genitals. The song was sung in the street and was reproduced and parodied in various forms in popular social media posts and mass-forwarded WhatsApp messages until it was nearly ubiquitously known in Lebanon. Its rapidly spreading popularity led some social media users to dub Bassil "the most cursed politician in the world for the shortest period of time." Bassil has claimed that all these attacks are part of a wider character assassination by his opponents.

=== World Economic Forum in Davos 2019 and 2020 ===
In January 2019, Bassil bragged at Davos that he can teach the United States and the United Kingdom "how to run a country without a budget". the Lebanese economy collapsed later that year.

In January 2020, he attended the World Economic Forum in Davos, and when asked by Hadley Gamble regarding the trip funding, he responded that it was offered to him. In the same meeting, the Dutch foreign trade minister, Sigrid Kaag, mentioned that in her home country, "we're not allowed to have friends like that."
