= List of members of the 2022–2026 Lebanese Parliament =

Following the 2022 Lebanese general election, 128 members of parliament were elected, including 68 incumbents and 7 women. The election marked significant gains for independent candidates of varying political persuasions and marked the first time since the 1992 Lebanese general election that the Future Movement did not participate.

== List ==
Name	Election Area	Parliamentary Bloc	Political Affiliation	Religion	Electoral List	Votes	Bloc Votes	Election Area Votes
Cynthia Zarazir	Beirut 1	Change Bloc	ReLebanon	Minorities	For my nation	486	8,261	46,696
Ghassan Chafic Hasbani	Beirut 1	Strong Republic	Lebanese Forces	Greek Orthodox	Beirut we are yours	7,080	13,220	46,696
Hagop Terezian	Beirut 1	Armenian Bloc of Representatives	Tashnag	Armenian Orthodox	We were and we remain for Beirut	2,667	10,950	46,696
Jean Arshak Talozian	Beirut 1		Independent	Armenian Catholic	Sovereign Lebanon	4,043	11,271	46,696
Jihad Karim Pakradouni	Beirut 1	Strong Republic	Lebanese Forces	Armenian Orthodox	Beirut we are yours	2,186	13,220	46,696
Nadim Bachir Gemayel	Beirut 1	Kataeb Representatives	Kataeb	Maronite	Sovereign Lebanon	4,425	11,271	46,696
Nicolas Maurice Sehnaoui	Beirut 1	Strong Lebanon	Free Patriotic Movement	Greek Catholic	We were and we remain for Beirut	4,781	10,950	46,696
Paula Sirakan Yacobian	Beirut 1	Change Bloc	Tahalof Watani	Armenian Orthodox	For my nation	3,524	8,261	46,696
Adnan Traboulsi	Beirut 2	National Consensus	Al-Ahbash	Sunni	For Beirut	8,463	14,931	148,926
Amin Mohammad Sherri	Beirut 2	Loyalty to the Resistance	Hezbollah	Shia	Beirut's Unity	26,363	36,926	148,926
Edgard Joseph Traboulsi	Beirut 2	Strong Lebanon	Free Patriotic Movement	Protestant	Beirut's Unity	2,053	36,926	148,926
Faisal Afif Al Sayegh	Beirut 2	Democratic Gathering	Progressive Socialist Party	Druze	Beirut Confronts	2,565	18,060	148,926
Fouad Moustapha Makhzoumi	Beirut 2	Renewal Bloc	National Dialogue Party	Sunni	Beirut Needs a Heart	10,021	19,421	148,926
Ibrahim Mneimneh	Beirut 2	Change Bloc	Beirut Tuqawem	Sunni	Beirut for Change	13,281	32,823	148,926
Imad Hout	Beirut 2	New Lebanon	Islamic Group	Sunni	This is Beirut	7,362	20,439	148,926
Melhem Khalaf	Beirut 2	Change Bloc	Independent	Greek Orthodox	Beirut for Change	7,141	32,823	148,926
Mohammad Moutapha Khawaja	Beirut 2	Development and Liberation	Amal Movement	Shia	Beirut's Unity	5,789	36,926	148,926
Nabil Badr	Beirut 2	New Lebanon	Independent	Sunni	This is Beirut	5,631	20,439	148,926
Waddah Sadek	Beirut 2	Alliance for Change	Khatt Ahmar	Sunni	Beirut For Change	3,760	32,823	148,926
Ahmad Mohammed Rustom	North 1 - Akkar	National Moderation	Ex-Future Movement	Alawite	National Moderate List	324	41,848	148,626
Assad Ramez Dargham	North 1 - Akkar	Strong Lebanon	Free Patriotic Movement	Greek Orthodox	Akkar First	5,754	41,761	148,626
Jimmy Georges Jabbour	North 1 - Akkar	Strong Lebanon	Free Patriotic Movement	Maronite	Akkar First	8,986	41,761	148,626
Mohammed Moustafa Sleiman	North 1 - Akkar	National Moderation	Ex-Future Movement	Sunni	National Moderate List	11,340	41,848	148,626
Mohammed Yehia Yehia	North 1 - Akkar	National Consensus	Independent	Sunni	Akkar First	15,142	41,761	148,626
Sajih Mkhayel Attieh	North 1 - Akkar	National Moderation	Independent	Greek Orthodox	National Moderate List	1,948	41,848	148,626
Walid Wajih El Baarini	North 1 - Akkar	National Moderation	Ex-Future Movement	Sunni	National Moderate List	11,099	41,848	148,626
Ahmad Mahmoud Khair	North 2 - Miniyeh	National Moderation	Ex-Future Movement	Sunni	Lebanon is ours	10,221	28,041	144,641
Abdelaziz Ibrahim Samad	North 2 - Danniyeh	National Moderation	Ex-Future Movement	Sunni	Lebanon is ours	10,221	28,041	144,641
Jihad Mourched El Samad	North 2 - Danniyeh		Independent	Sunni	Popular Will	7,824	29,277	144,641
Abdelkarim Mohammed Kabbara	North 2 - Tripoli		Independent	Sunni	For the people	5,023	16,215	144,641
Ashraf Ahmad Rifi	North 2 - Tripoli	Renewal Bloc	Independent	Sunni	Nation's Salvation	11,593	30,006	144,641
Elias Fouad El Khoury	North 2 - Tripoli	Strong Republic	Lebanese Forces	Maronite	Nation's Salvation	3,426	30,006	144,641
Faisal Omar Karami	North 2 - Tripoli	National Consensus	Dignity Movement	Sunni	Popular Will	6,494	29,277	144,641
Haidar Nasser	North 2 - Tripoli	New Lebanon	Independent	Alawite	Revolt...for Sovereignty and Justice	313	14,181	144,641
Ihab Mohammed Mattar	North 2 - Tripoli		Independent	Sunni	Real Change	6,518	16,825	144,641
Jamil Abboud Abboud	North 2 - Tripoli	New Lebanon	Independent	Greek Orthodox	Nation's Salvation	79	30,006	144,641
Taha Atfat Naji	North 2 - Tripoli	National Consensus	Al-Ahbash	Sunni	Popular Will	7,407	29,277	144,641
Michel Chawki El Doueihy	North 3 - Zgharta	Alliance for Change	Independent	Maronite	Our North	1,768	14,121	122,311
Michel Rene Mouawad	North 3 - Zgharta	Renewal Bloc	Independence Movement	Maronite	North of confrontation	9,261	22,613	122,311
Tony Sleiman Frangieh	North 3 - Zgharta	Independent National Bloc	Marada	Maronite	Unity of the North	8,945	26,475	122,311
Adib Gerges Abdelmassih	North 3 - Koura	Kataeb Representatives	Independent	Greek Orthodox	North of confrontation	1,815	22,613	122,311
Fadi Abdallah Karam	North 3 - Koura	Strong Republic	Lebanese Forces	Maronite	Strong Republic Pulse	9,226	39,844	122,311
Georges Naim Atallah	North 3 - Koura	Strong Lebanon	Free Patriotic Movement	Greek Orthodox	We will remain here	2,698	17,077	122,311
Sitrida Elias Tawk	North 3 - Bsharri	Strong Republic	Lebanese Forces	Maronite	Strong Republic Pulse	7,924	39,844	122,311
William Gebran Tawk	North 3 - Bsharri	Independent National Bloc	Independent	Maronite	Unity of the North	3,566	26,475	122,311
Gebran Gergi Bassil	North 3 - Batroun	Strong Lebanon	Free Patriotic Movement	Maronite	We will remain here	8,922	17,077	122,311
Ghayath Michel Yazbeck	North 3 - Batroun	Strong Republic	Lebanese Forces	Maronite	Strong Republic Pulse	11,094	39,844	122,311
Simon Farid Abi Ramia	Mount Lebanon 1 - Jbeil	Consultative Gathering	Independent	Maronite	We were and we remain	6,239	34,192	118,379
Raed Akif Berro	Mount Lebanon 1 - Jbeil	Loyalty to the Resistance	Hezbollah	Shia	We were and we remain	9,508	34,192	118,379
Ziad Halim Al Hawwat	Mount Lebanon 1 - Jbeil	Strong Republic	Lebanese Forces	Maronite	With you we can until the end	13,078	27,939	118,379
Chawki Gergi Daccache	Mount Lebanon 1 - Kesserwan	Strong Republic	Lebanese Forces	Maronite	With you we can until the end	9,129	27,939	118,379
Farid Haykal Al Khazen	Mount Lebanon 1 - Kesserwan	Independent National Bloc	Independent	Maronite	Heart of Independent Lebanon	9,056	14,979	118,379
Nada Nohad Boustani	Mount Lebanon 1 - Kesserwan	Strong Lebanon	Free Patriotic Movement	Maronite	We were and we remain	11,338	34,192	118,379
Nehmat Georges Frem	Mount Lebanon 1 - Kesserwan	New Lebanon	Independent	Maronite	Scream of a nation	10,743	25,713	118,379
Salim Boutros Sayegh	Mount Lebanon 1 - Kesserwan	Kataeb Representatives	Kataeb	Maronite	Scream of a nation	3,477	25,713	118,379
Elias Nicolas Bou Saab	Mount Lebanon 2 - Metn	Consultative Gathering	Independent	Greek Orthodox	We were and we remain for Metn	4,050	20,533	93,149
Elias Rakif Hankash	Mount Lebanon 2 - Metn	Kataeb Representatives	Kataeb	Maronite	On the way to change	6,148	22,523	93,149
Hagop Ohanes Hagop Bakradonian	Mount Lebanon 2 - Metn	Armenian Bloc of Representatives	Tashnag	Armenian Orthodox	Stronger together	4,973	15,997	93,149
Ibrahim Youssef Kanaan	Mount Lebanon 2 - Metn	Consultative Gathering	Independent	Maronite	We were and we remain for Metn	5,513	20,533	93,149
Melhem Antoun Riachi	Mount Lebanon 2 - Metn	Strong Republic	Lebanese Forces	Greek Catholic	On the way to Liberty	15,254	21,301	93,149
Michel Elias El Murr	Mount Lebanon 2 - Metn	Independent National Bloc	Independent	Greek Orthodox	Stronger together	8,607	15,997	93,149
Razi Wadih Hajj	Mount Lebanon 2 - Metn	Strong Republic	Lebanese Forces	Maronite	On the way to Liberty	3,459	21,301	93,149
Sami Amin Gemayel	Mount Lebanon 2 - Metn	Kataeb Representatives	Kataeb	Maronite	On the way to change	10,466	22,523	93,149
Alain Aoun	Mount Lebanon 3 - Baabda	Consultative Gathering	Independent	Maronite	National Accord	8,457	33,962	84,728
Ali Fadel Ammar	Mount Lebanon 3 - Baabda	Loyalty to the Resistance	Hezbollah	Shia	National Accord	14,852	33,962	84,728
Camille Michel Dory Chamoun	Mount Lebanon 3 - Baabda	Strong Republic	National Liberal Party	Maronite	Baabda Sovereignty and Decision	1,876	29,801	84,728
Fadi Fakhri Alameh	Mount Lebanon 3 - Baabda	Development and Liberation	Amal Movement	Shia	National Accord	4,862	33,962	84,728
Hadi Mohammad Rafik Aboul Hosn	Mount Lebanon 3 - Baabda	Democratic Gathering	Progressive Socialist Party	Druze	Baabda Sovereignty and Decision	10,764	29,801	84,728
Pierre Rachid Bou Assi	Mount Lebanon 3 - Baabda	Strong Republic	Lebanese Forces	Maronite	Baabda Sovereignty and Decision	14,756	29,801	84,728
Akram Hussein Chehayeb	Mount Lebanon 4 - Aley	Democratic Gathering	Progressive Socialist Party	Druze	Partnership and Desire	11,373	83,389	179,976
Cezar Raymond Abi Khalil	Mount Lebanon 4 - Aley	Strong Lebanon	Free Patriotic Movement	Maronite	List of the Mountain	5,698	41,545	179,976
Mark Bahjat Daou	Mount Lebanon 4 - Aley	ِAlliance for Change	Taqqadum	Druze	United for Change	11,656	42,077	179,976
Nazih Matta	Mount Lebanon 4 - Aley	Strong Republic	Lebanese Forces	Greek Orthodox	Partnership and Desire	9,191	83,389	179,976
Raji Saad	Mount Lebanon 4 - Aley	Democratic Gathering	Progressive Socialist Party	Maronite	Partnership and Desire	8,503	83,389	179,976
Bilal Ahmad Abdallah	Mount Lebanon 4 - Chouf	Democratic Gathering	Progressive Socialist Party	Sunni	Partnership and Desire	8,186	83,389	179,976
Farid Georges Philip Al Boustani	Mount Lebanon 4 - Chouf	Strong Lebanon	Independent	Maronite	List of the Mountain	4,347	41,545	179,976
Georges Jamil Adwan	Mount Lebanon 4 - Chouf	Strong Republic	Lebanese Forces	Maronite	Partnership and Desire	11,433	83,389	179,976
Ghassan Amal Attallah	Mount Lebanon 4 - Chouf	Strong Lebanon	Free Patriotic Movement	Greek Catholic	List of the Mountain	5,149	41,545	179,976
Halima Ibrahim Kaakour	Mount Lebanon 4 - Chouf	Change Bloc	Lana	Sunni	United for Change	6,684	42,077	179,976
Marwan Mohammad Hmadeh	Mount Lebanon 4 - Chouf	Democratic Gathering	Progressive Socialist Party	Druze	Partnership and Desire	11,121	83,389	179,976
Najat Khattar Aoun Saliba	Mount Lebanon 4 - Chouf	Change Bloc	Taqqadum	Maronite	United for Change	9,332	42,077	179,976
Taymour Walid Joumblatt	Mount Lebanon 4 - Chouf	Democratic Gathering	Progressive Socialist Party	Druze	Partnership and Desire	12,917	83,389	179,976
Abdelrahman Nazih Bizri	South 1 - Saida	Saida-Jezzine Bloc	Independent	Sunni	We vote for change	8,526	18,783	61,290
Oussama Maarouf Saad El Masri	South 1 - Saida	Saida-Jezzine Bloc	Popular Nasserist Organization	Sunni	We vote for change	7,341	18,783	61,290
Charbel Maroun Massaad	South 1 - Jezzine	Saida-Jezzine Bloc	Independent	Maronite	We vote for change	984	18,783	61,290
Ghada Khalil Ayoub	South 1 - Jezzine	Strong Republic	Lebanese Forces	Greek Catholic	Our union in Saida and Jezzine	7,953	13,948	61,290
Saiid Sleiman Asmar	South 1 - Jezzine	Strong Republic	Lebanese Forces	Maronite	Our union in Saida and Jezzine	1,102	13,948	61,290
Ali Adel Ossairan	South 2 - Zahrani	Development and Liberation	Amal Movement	Shia	Hope and Loyalty	2,294	138,242	163,183
Michel Hanna Moussa	South 2 - Zahrani	Development and Liberation	Amal Movement	Greek Catholic	Hope and Loyalty	1,364	138,242	163,183
Nabih Moustafa Berri	South 2 - Zahrani	Development and Liberation	Amal Movement	Shia	Hope and Loyalty	42,091	138,242	163,183
Ali Youssef Khreiss	South 2 - Tyre	Development and Liberation	Amal Movement	Shia	Hope and Loyalty	16,964	138,242	163,183
Hassan Mohammed Ali Ezzeddine	South 2 - Tyre	Loyalty to the Resistance	Hezbollah	Shia	Hope and Loyalty	27,927	138,242	163,183
Hussein Said Jechi	South 2 - Tyre	Loyalty to the Resistance	Hezbollah	Shia	Hope and Loyalty	27,416	138,242	163,183
Inaya Mohamad Ezzeddine	South 2 - Tyre	Development and Liberation	Amal Movement	Shia	Hope and Loyalty	15,266	138,242	163,183
Hani Hassan Kobaisi	South 3 - Nabatieh	Development and Liberation	Amal Movement	Shia	Hope and Loyalty	20,195	197,822	232,200
Mohamad Hassan Raad	South 3 - Nabatieh	Loyalty to the Resistance	Hezbollah	Shia	Hope and Loyalty	48,543	197,822	232,200
Nasser Fawzi Jaber	South 3 - Nabatieh	Development and Liberation	Amal Movement	Shia	Hope and Loyalty	6,236	197,822	232,200
Ali Rachid Fayad	South 3 - Marjeyoun-Hasbaya	Loyalty to the Resistance	Hezbollah	Shia	Hope and Loyalty	37,047	197,822	232,200
Ali Hassan Khalil	South 3 - Marjeyoun-Hasbaya	Development and Liberation	Amal Movement	Shia	Hope and Loyalty	13,155	197,822	232,200
Elias Fares Jradeh	South 3 - Marjeyoun-Hasbaya	Change Bloc	Independent	Greek Orthodox	Together towards change	9,218	30,384	232,200
Firas Ismail Hamdan	South 3 - Marjeyoun-Hasbaya	Change Bloc	Independent	Druze	Together towards change	4,859	30,384	232,200
Kassem Omar Hachem	South 3 - Marjeyoun-Hasbaya	Development and Liberation	Arab Socialist Ba'ath Party – Lebanon Region	Sunni	Hope and Loyalty	1,215	197,822	232,200
Ashraf Nazih Hachem Beydoun	South 3 - Bint Jbeil	Development and Liberation	Amal Movement	Shia	Hope and Loyalty	10,540	197,822	232,200
Ayoub Fahed Hmayid	South 3 - Bint Jbeil	Development and Liberation	Amal Movement	Shia	Hope and Loyalty	6,745	197,822	232,200
Hassan Nizamddine Fadlallah	South 3 - Bint Jbeil	Loyalty to the Resistance	Hezbollah	Shia	Hope and Loyalty	43,324	197,822	232,200
Bilal Melhem Hechaime	Bekaa 1 - Zahle	New Lebanon	Ex-Future Movement	Sunni	Zahle Sovereignty	2,568	25,646	92,691
Elias André Estephan	Bekaa 1 - Zahle	Strong Republic	Lebanese Forces	Greek Orthodox	Zahle Sovereignty	6,758	25,646	92,691
Georges Boujikian	Bekaa 1 - Zahle	Independent National bloc	Independent	Armenian Orthodox	Zahle the message	2,568	27,872	92,691
Georges Elie Okais	Bekaa 1 - Zahle	Strong Republic	Lebanese Forces	Greek Catholic	Zahle Sovereignty	11,921	25,646	92,691
Michel Georges Daher	Bekaa 1 - Zahle		Independent	Greek Catholic	Independent Sovereignists	9,229	15,477	92,691
Rami Anis Abou Hamdan	Bekaa 1 - Zahle	Loyalty to the Resistance	Hezbollah	Shia	Zahle the message	15,601	27,872	92,691
Salim Georges Aoun	Bekaa 1 - Zahle	Strong Lebanon	Free Patriotic Movement	Maronite	Zahle the message	5,554	27,872	92,691
Charbel Maroun	Bekaa 2 - West Bekaa-Rashaya	Strong Lebanon	Free Patriotic Movement	Maronite	Better Tomorrow	3,576	28,920	66,148
~~Ghassan Skaff~~ Died 13 December 2025	~~Bekaa 2 - West Bekaa-Rashaya~~		~~Independent~~	~~Greek Orthodox~~	~~Independent National Decision~~	~~776~~	~~19,054~~	~~66,148~~
Hassan Mrad	Bekaa 2 - West Bekaa-Rashaya	National Consensus	Union Party	Sunni	Better Tomorrow	9,157	28,920	66,148
Kabalan Kabalan	Bekaa 2 - West Bekaa-Rashaya	Development and Liberation	Amal Movement	Shia	Better Tomorrow	10,143	28,920	66,148
Yassin Yassin	Bekaa 2 - West Bekaa-Rashaya	Change Bloc	Independent	Sunni	Our Valley and Mountain	6,004	11,397	66,148
Wael Wehbe Abou Faour	Bekaa 2 - West Bekaa-Rashaya	Democratic Gathering	Progressive Socialist Party	Druze	Future for W. Bekaa and Rashaya	9,202	11,397	66,148
Ali Mohamad Salman Bachir El Mokdad	Bekaa 3 - Baalbek-Hermel	Loyalty to the Resistance	Hezbollah	Shia	Hope and Loyalty	20,356	154,358	191,139
Antoine El Badaoui Habchi	Bekaa 3 - Baalbek-Hermel	Strong Republic	Lebanese Forces	Maronite	Construction of the State	17,000	23,308	191,139
Ghazy Mohamad Zaaiter	Bekaa 3 - Baalbek-Hermel	Development and Liberation	Amal Movement	Shia	Hope and Loyalty	22,058	154,358	191,139
Hussein Ali El Hajj Hassan	Bekaa 3 - Baalbek-Hermel	Loyalty to the Resistance	Hezbollah	Shia	Hope and Loyalty	23,120	154,358	191,139
Ibrahim Ali El Mousawi	Bekaa 3 - Baalbek-Hermel	Loyalty to the Resistance	Hezbollah	Shia	Hope and Loyalty	19,627	154,358	191,139
Ihab Arwa Hmade	Bekaa 3 - Baalbek-Hermel	Loyalty to the Resistance	Hezbollah	Shia	Hope and Loyalty	20,844	154,358	191,139
Jamil Mohamad Amin Amin El Sayed	Bekaa 3 - Baalbek-Hermel		Independent	Shia	Hope and Loyalty	11,705	154,358	191,139
Melhem Mohammed El Houjairi	Bekaa 3 - Baalbek-Hermel	Loyalty to the Resistance	Independent	Sunni	Hope and Loyalty	7,125	154,358	191,139
Samer Assaad Toum	Bekaa 3 - Baalbek-Hermel	Strong Lebanon	Free Patriotic Movement	Greek Catholic	Hope and Loyalty	11,343	154,358	191,139
Yanal Mohammed Solh	Bekaa 3 - Baalbek-Hermel	Loyalty to the Resistance	Independent	Sunni	Hope and Loyalty	8,764	154,358	191,139

== See also ==
- 2022 Lebanese general election
- Members of the 2005–2009 Lebanese Parliament
- List of members of the 2009–2017 Lebanese Parliament
- List of members of the 2018-2022 Lebanese Parliament
