= 2022–2025 Lebanese presidential election =

Delayed, indirect election of the Lebanese president

- 29 September 2022 – 9 January 2025
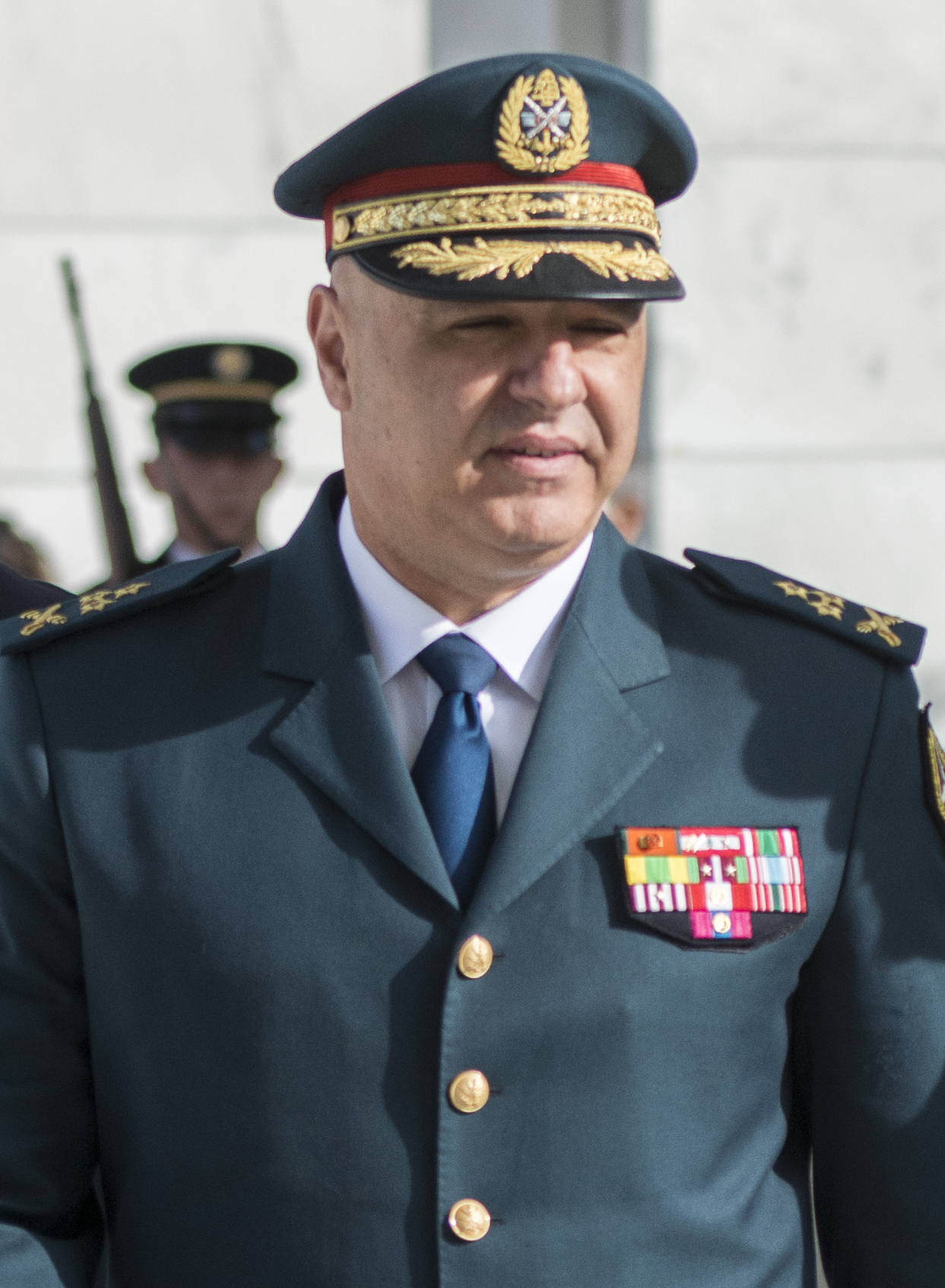

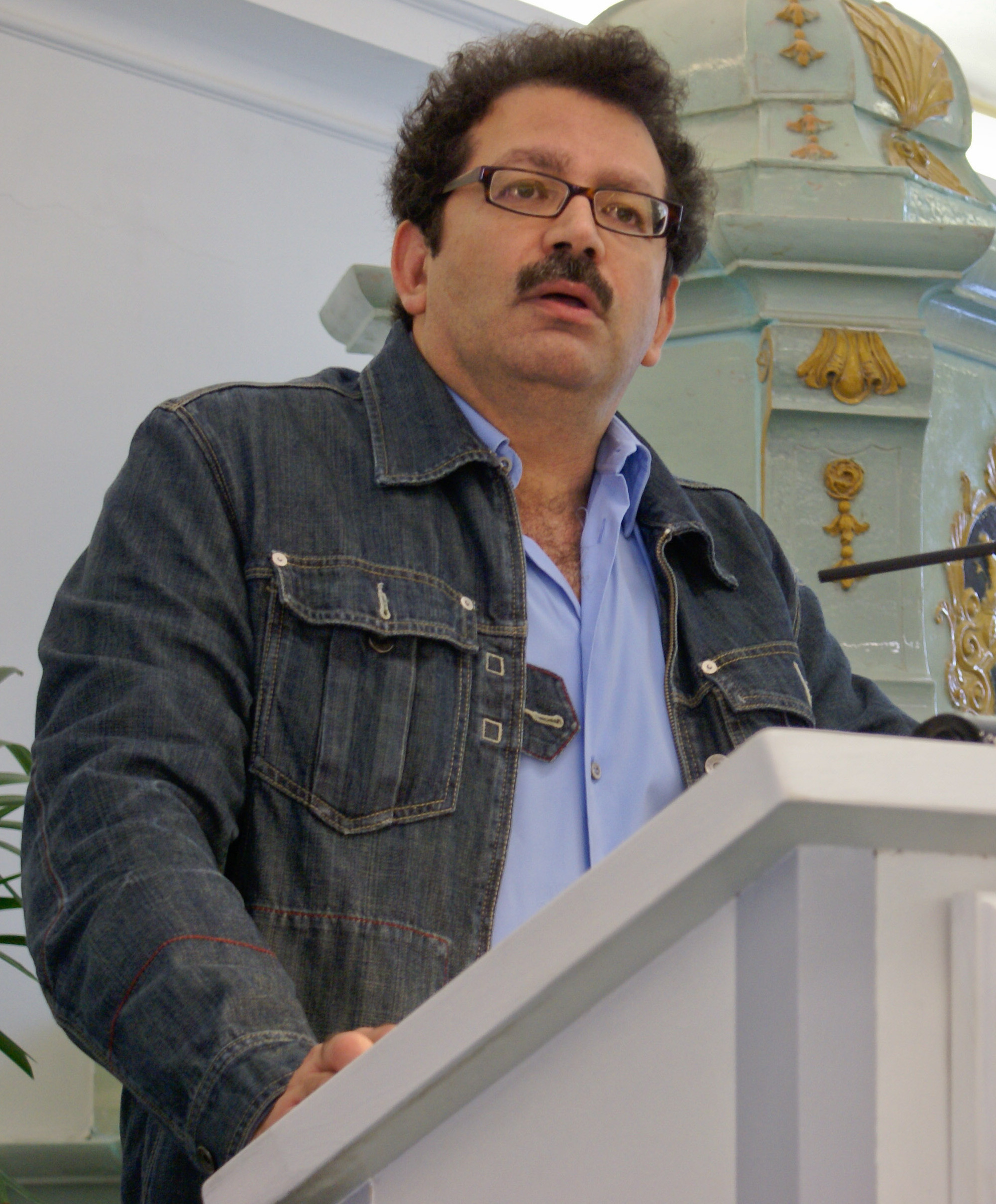
Nominee	Joseph Aoun	Chibli Mallat
Party	Independent (Note: Aoun was the commander of the Lebanese Armed Forces.)	Independent
Electoral vote	99	2
Percentage	77.34%	1.56%
President before election
Najib Mikati (acting)
Azm Movement
Elected President
Joseph Aoun
Independent

On 29 September 2022, an indirect election for the Lebanese presidency was initiated to determine the successor of term-limited incumbent Michel Aoun, who took office on 31 October 2016. On 9 January 2025, Joseph Aoun (no relation to Michel), who had been serving as the Commander of the Lebanese Armed Forces since 9 March 2017, secured 99 votes to win the presidential election in the second round of the 13th parliamentary session. He took office on the same day, becoming the country's 14th president and the fifth military commander to assume the role.

Under Article 49 of the Lebanese constitution, in the first round of an electoral session, a qualified majority of two-thirds of the members of the Lebanese parliament is required to elect the president. If no candidate reaches that threshold, then further rounds of voting are held, where an absolute majority of all members of parliament is sufficient to elect the president. The years-long process for this election was not without precedent; the previous election took 46 sessions with multiple rounds from 2014 to 2016. In accordance with the country's National Pact, the presidency is always held by a Maronite Christian. The incumbent president is only eligible for re-election to a second non-consecutive term.

The 2022–2025 presidential election marked the first time since 1958 that Lebanon completed an electoral process free of interference from neighbouring Syria, which routinely meddled in Lebanese internal affairs from the 1963 Syrian coup d'état until the 2024 collapse of the Ba'athist regime, including directly during the Syrian occupation of Lebanon between 1976 and 2005.

== Background ==
=== 2019–21 protests ===
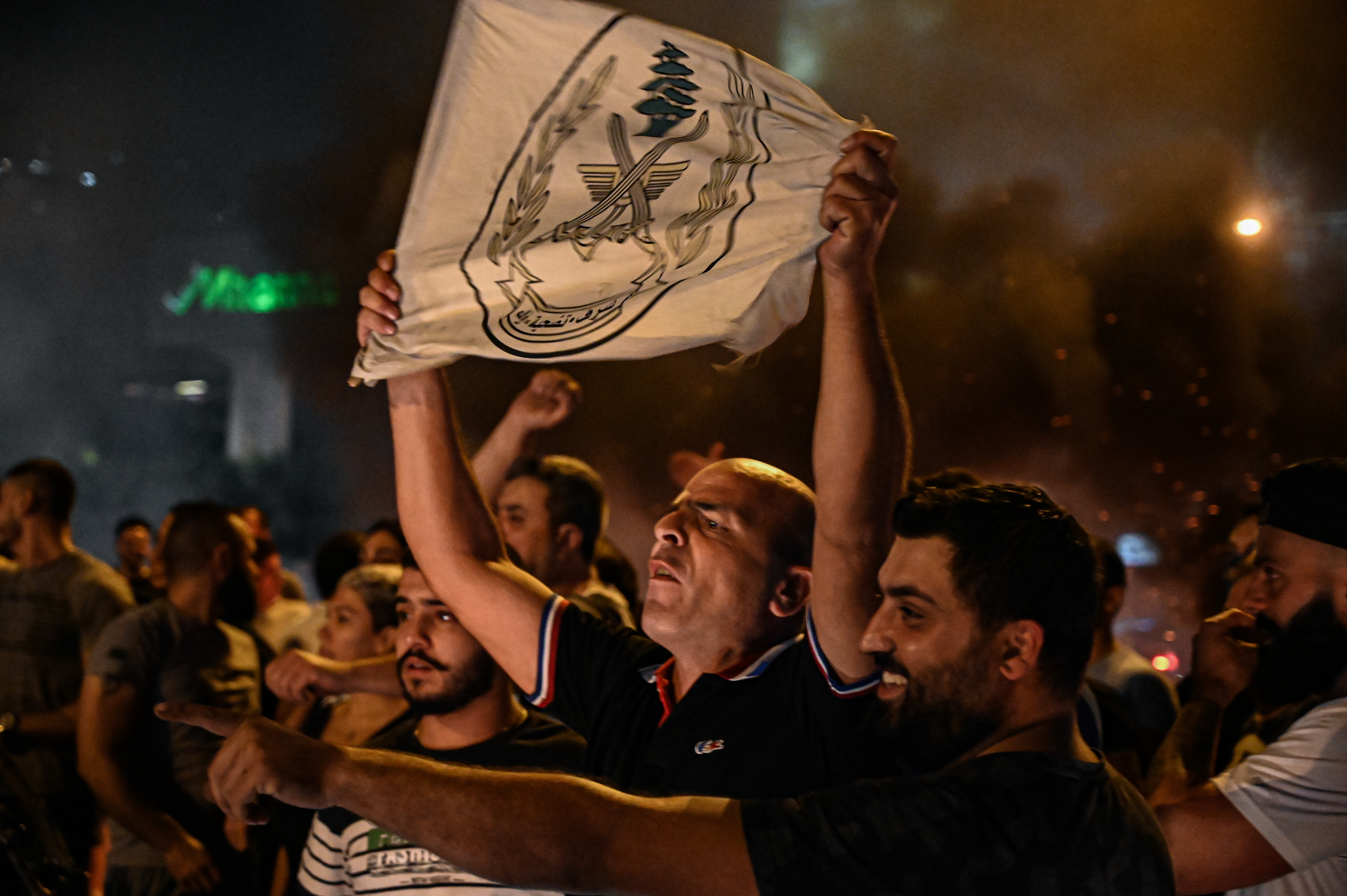
2019 Lebanese protests in Antelias

Large-scale anti-government demonstrations ignited in Lebanon on 17 October 2019. Initially triggered in response to a rise in gas and tobacco prices as well as a new tax on messaging applications, This resulted in the forkward demonstrations quickly turned into a revolution against the stagnation of the economy, unemployment, Lebanon's sectarian and hereditary political system, corruption and the government's inability to provide essential services such as water, electricity and sanitation. Prime Minister Saad Hariri ended up resigning on 29 October 2019.

Hassan Diab was appointed prime minister by President Michel Aoun on 19 December 2019. His government obtained the confidence of parliament by 69 votes in its favour.

However, the country's economic situation continued to deteriorate. The government was over 95 billion dollars in debt by the end of 2020, the Lebanese pound lost 70% of its value in six months, and 35% of the active population was unemployed. Riots broke out in Beirut and Tripoli and Jounieh.

=== Beirut explosion ===
On 4 August 2020, the explosion of several thousand tons of ammonium nitrate stored in a hangar in the Port of Beirut caused considerable human and material damage across the city and the port. The final toll was 218 dead and over 7,000 injured and damage estimated at nearly four billion euros by the World Bank and estimated to have left 300,000 homeless. The industrial-port zone of the Port of Beirut was badly affected, further aggravating the economic situation. Prior to the explosion, 60% of the country's imports transited through the port.

The blast was so powerful that it physically shook the whole country of Lebanon. It was felt in Turkey, Syria, Palestine, Jordan, and Israel, as well as parts of Europe, and was heard in Cyprus, more than 240 km (150 mi) away. It was detected by the United States Geological Survey as a seismic event of magnitude 3.3 and is considered one of the most powerful accidental artificial non-nuclear explosions in history.

The Lebanese government declared a two-week state of emergency in response to the disaster. In its aftermath, protests erupted across Lebanon against the government for their failure to prevent the disaster, joining a larger series of protests which had been taking place across the country since 2019. On 10 August 2020, Prime Minister Hassan Diab and the Lebanese cabinet resigned.

The adjacent grain silos were badly damaged. In July and August 2022, part of the silos collapsed following a weeks-long fire in the remaining grain.

=== 2022 parliamentary elections ===
In May 2022, Lebanon held its first election since a painful economic crisis dragged it to the brink of becoming a failed state. Lebanon's crisis has been so severe that more than 80 percent of the population is now considered poor by the United Nations. In the election Iran-backed Shia Muslim Hezbollah movement and its allies lost their parliamentary majority. Hezbollah did not lose any of its seats, but its allies lost seats. Hezbollah's ally, President Michel Aoun's Free Patriotic Movement, was no longer the biggest Christian party after the election. A rival Christian party, led by Samir Geagea, with close ties to Saudi Arabia, the Lebanese Forces (LF), made gains. Sunni Future Movement, led by former prime minister Saad Hariri, did not participate the election, leaving a political vacuum to other Sunni politicians to fill.

=== Israel–Hezbollah conflict and fall of the Assad regime ===
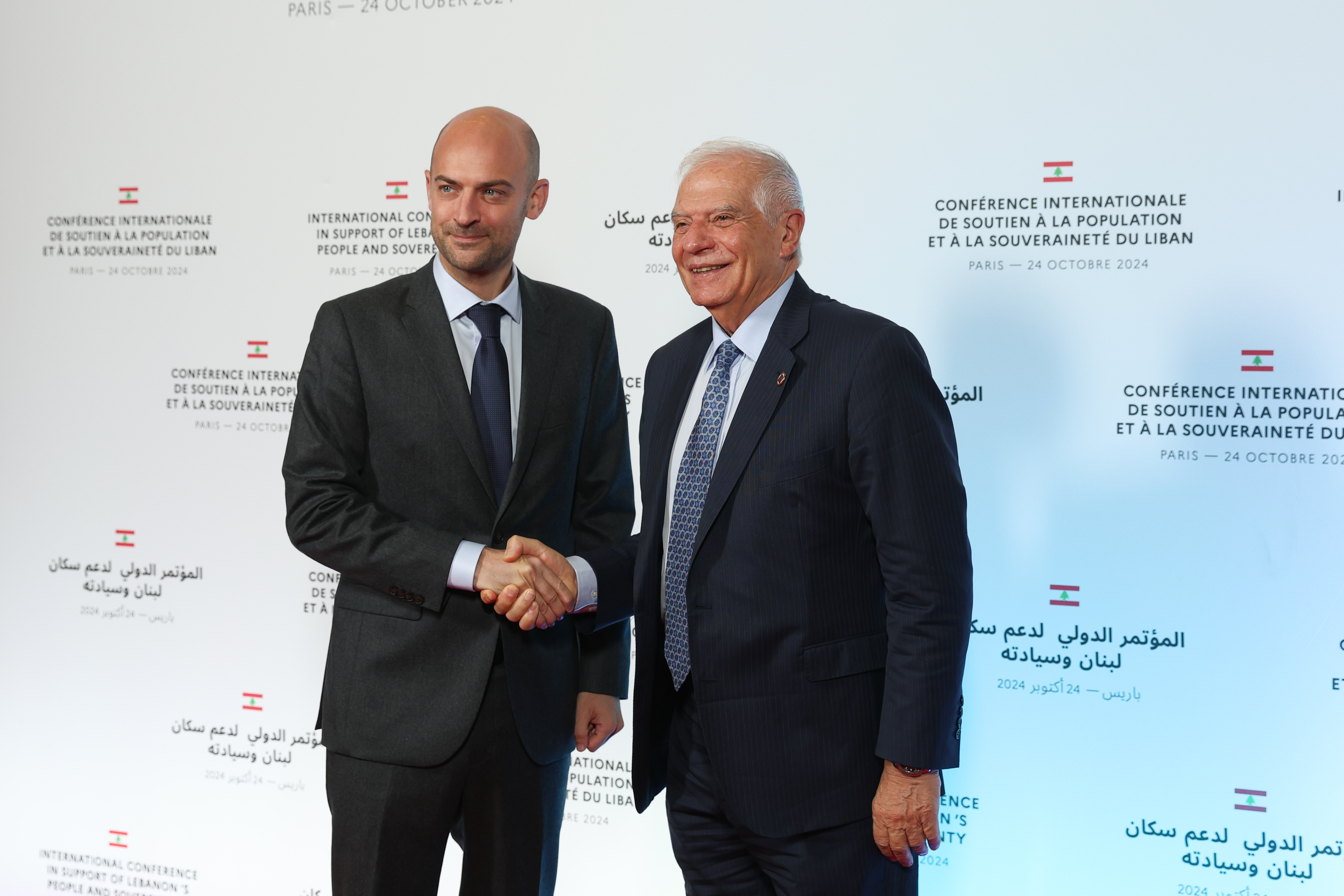
French Minister of Foreign Affairs Jean-Noël Barrot and then-Vice-President of the European Commission Josep Borrell attending the International Conference in Support of the Population and Sovereignty of Lebanon in Paris, France (24 October 2024)

A day after Hamas launched its 7 October 2023 attacks on Israel and Israel began its bombing of Gaza, Hezbollah joined the conflict in "solidarity with the Palestinians" by firing on Israeli military outposts in Shebaa Farms, and Golan Heights—both territories under Israeli occupation. Since then, Hezbollah and Israel have been involved in cross-border military exchanges that have displaced entire communities in Israel and Lebanon, with significant damage to buildings and land along the border. Israel subsequently invaded southern Lebanon. The Israeli offensive weakened Hezbollah; it lost many senior officials, including its leader, Hassan Nasrallah. This has eroded Hezbollah's operational and financial strength.

After the fall of the Assad regime, rebel leader Ahmed al-Sharaa stated that Syria would not interfere in Lebanese internal affairs as it had under Assad; he added that "if the Lebanese agree on Joseph Aoun as president, we will support him".

== Electoral system ==
The Constitution of Lebanon does not require candidates to explicitly stand or state any mechanism by which they can. Candidates can only express an interest in the position.

Under article 49 of the Lebanese Constitution, a qualified majority of two-thirds of the members of the Lebanese Parliament is required to elect the president in the first round. The quorum also amounts to two-thirds of the Parliament. In the second round, a president can be elected by a simple majority of 65 deputies. There is however ambiguity on the constitutionality of the two-thirds quorum, since constitutional texts do not explicitly mention it. Some have interpreted this omission as intentional, such as legal scholar Assam Khalifeh, while Speaker Nabih Berri has relied on the opposite interpretation to enable his allies to resort to quorum-busting. An example of this would be the 2014–2016 Lebanese presidential election, where quorum would not be met for forty-three electoral sessions.

The Constitution also states that, in the last ten days of the incumbent's tenure, the powers of an electoral college are vested in parliament.

=== National Pact ===
The National Pact, an informal agreement agreed in 1943, requires that the president should be a Maronite Christian, the prime minister a Sunni Muslim, and the speaker of parliament a Shiite Muslim. The National Pact is based on an unwritten agreement concluded in 1943 between the Maronite Christian president, Bechara El Khoury, and his Sunni prime minister, Riad Al Solh, when Lebanon gained independence from France.

== Candidates ==
=== Declared interest ===
Declared candidates included:

- Bechara Abi Younes, candidate for the 2009 Lebanese general election, engineer and president of the Environmental Rescue party
- Ziad Hayek, former head of the High Council for Privatization and public-private partnership (2006–2019), Lebanese nominee for president of the World Bank in 2019
- Tracy Chamoun, daughter of Dany Chamoun and former ambassador of Lebanon to Jordan (2017–2020)
- May Rihani, international development and gender scholar, Director of the Gibran Chair for Values and Peace at the University of Maryland, former UN co-chair of the United Nations Girls' Education Initiative (2008–2010)
- Elias Tawileh, engineer
- Sayed Boutros Franjieh, businessman
- Elie Yachoui, Dean of the Business Administration and Economics faculty at the Notre Dame University–Louaize
- Chibli Mallat, lawyer and activist
- Samir Geagea, incumbent party leader (2005–present)
- Neemat Frem, CEO of INDEVCO Group and MP (2018–present)

=== Other potential candidates ===
==== Kataeb Party ====
- Samy Gemayel, MP (2009–present) and incumbent party leader (2015–present)
- Nadim Gemayel, MP (2009–present)

==== Lebanese Forces ====
- Sethrida Geagea, MP (2005–present) and former chairwoman of the party

==== Free Patriotic Movement ====
- Gebran Bassil, MP (2018–present), incumbent party leader (2015–present) and former Minister of Telecommunications (2009–2009), Energy and Water (2009–2014) and Foreign Affairs (2014–2020)
- Ibrahim Kanaan, MP (2005–present) and Chairman of the Parliamentary Budget and Financial Affairs Commission (2009–present).

==== Other ====
- Joseph Aoun, 14th Commander of the Lebanese Armed Forces (2017–present).
- Ziyad Baroud, lawyer, professor and former Minister of Interior (2008–2011) and candidate for the 2018 Lebanese general election. According to L'Orient–Le Jour, a previous candidacy for the FPM led the opposition to veto his candidacy.
- Salah Honein, former MP (2000–2005) and member of the Qornet Shehwan Gathering
- Chibli Mallat, international lawyer, professor and candidate for the aborted 2005–2006 presidential election
- Jihad Azour, former Minister of Finance (2005–2008)and the current Middle East and Central Asia Director in the IMF. According to L'Orient–Le Jour, he is opposed by Hezbollah due to his participation in the first Siniora government.
- Samir Assaf, HSBC executive. According to L'Orient–Le Jour, he is close to Macron, and enjoys French support because of his distance from the political establishment, but may lack familiarity with Lebanese political life.
- Nassif Hitti, diplomat and former Minister of Foreign Affairs and Emigrants (2020). According to L'Orient–Le Jour, he left the government in 2020 because he felt the government had allowed Abbas Ibrahim, head of the Sûreté générale, to encroach on his diplomatic responsibilities, and elicits some support and opposition in the Aounist camp.
- Philippe Ziade, businessman and Honorary Consul of Lebanon in Nevada
- Roger Dib, former Minister, member in the National Committee of Christian/Muslim Dialogue, director of the Near East Consulting Group
- Farid Elias El-Khazen, former MP (2005–2018), ambassador to the Holy See (2018–present). According to L'Orient–Le Jour, he enjoyed good relations with the Maronite church, and the Assad regime; he was part of Frangieh's parliamentary bloc.
- Farid Haykal al-Khazen, MP for Kesserwan District
- Georges Khoury, former head of military intelligence in the Lebanese Armed Forces and ambassador to the Holy See (2008–2018)
- Elias Baisary, chief of the General Directorate of General Security
- Jean-Louis Cardahi, former Telecommunications Minister
- Salah Honein, lawyer and former MP

=== Withdrawals ===
- Michel Moawad, MP (2018–present) and incumbent leader of the Independence Movement (2005–present)
- Issam Khalifeh, historian, academic at the Lebanese University and trade unionist, first president of the National Union of Lebanese University Students
- Suleiman Frangieh, Leader of the Marada Movement (1990–present), MP (1991–2005, 2009–2018)

== Election ==
=== 2022 ===
==== First to fourth sessions ====
The first electoral session was held on 29 September 2022. The first and only round did not result in any candidate's election, due to the need to secure an absolute majority of 86 votes. Notably, 10 MPs voted for "Lebanon" while one vote went to Mahsa Amini. Before the second round, a number of deputies unexpectedly left the Chamber, leading the assembly to lose the quorum by one MP and postponing the vote without a second round.

A second session was held on 13 October but failed to secure a quorum with only 71 out of 128 deputies being there due to FPM boycotting the session in memorial of 13 October 1990, below the quorum of 2/3 (86 deputies).

A third session was held on 20 October 2022. Michel Moawad received 42 votes, 55 MPs voted with a blank slip, one MP voted for Milad Abou Malhab. 17 MPs submitted ballots reading "New Lebanon", and one each for "Ruler, savior and reformer", "For Lebanon", "Righteous dictator" and "Nobody". The second round was once again cancelled as FPM deputies left the Chamber, causing the loss of the quorum.

The fourth session to elect a president was held on 24 October with the presence of 114 deputies. In the first (and only) round, Moawad received 39 votes, while 50 blank ballots were registered, and 10 votes for Issam Khalifeh, a reputable academic nominated by a number of pro-Change MPs. A number of MPs voted "New Lebanon" as in the previous session, while Jamil Al Sayyed wrote "My Condolences" on his ballot paper. As per the previous sessions, quorum was lost before a second round could be held.

First session				Second session				Third session				Fourth session			
29 September				13 October				20 October				24 October			
Candidate	Party	Votes	%	Candidate	Party	Votes	%	Candidate	Party	Votes	%	Candidate	Party	Votes	%
Michel Moawad	IM	36	76.60	No quorum				Michel Moawad	IM	42	97.67	Michel Moawad	IM	39	79.59
Salim Eddé	Ind.	11	23.40	No quorum				Milad Abou Malhab	Ind.	1	2.33	Issam Khalifeh	Ind.	10	20.41
Valid votes		47	38.52	Valid votes			N/A	Valid votes		43	36.13	Valid votes		49	42.98
Blank votes		63	51.64	Blank votes			N/A	Blank votes		55	46.22	Blank votes		50	43.86
Invalid votes		12	9.84	Invalid votes			N/A	Invalid votes		21	17.65	Invalid votes		15	13.16
Total		122	100	Total		71		Total		119	100	Total		114	100
Eligible voters/turnout		128	95.31	Eligible voters/turnout		128		Eligible voters/turnout		128	92.97	Eligible voters/turnout		128	89.06

==== Power vacuum ====
Michel Aoun signed the government's resignation decree, a day before the end of his term, and Prime Minister Najib Mikati's government remained in office in a caretaker capacity, which was unconstitutional since it went against Aoun's request for the cabinet's step-down after numerous attempts failed to form a new cabinet. Aoun's six-year term expired on 31 October 2022, with no successor designated, similarly to his predecessors.

==== Fifth session ====
The fifth session to elect a president was held on 10 November with the presence of 108 deputies. In the first (and only) round, Moawad received 44 votes, while 47 blank ballots were registered, 6 votes for Issam Khalifeh, a reputable academic nominated by a number of pro-Change MPs, 1 vote for former Minister Ziyad Baroud from Deputy Speaker Elias Bou Saab and 1 vote for Ziad Hayek from Elias Jaradeh. 7 MPs voted "New Lebanon" as in the previous session, while Zgharta MP Michel Douaihy wrote "Plan B" on his ballot paper and one vote went "For Lebanon". As per the previous sessions, quorum was lost before a second round could be held.

First Round
Candidate	Party	Votes	%
Michel Moawad	IM	44	84.61
Issam Khalifeh	Ind.	6	11.53
Ziyad Baroud	Ind.	1	1.92
Ziad Hayek	Ind.	1	1.92
Valid votes		52	48.14
Blank votes		47	43.51
Invalid votes		9	9.72
Total		108	100
Eligible voters/turnout		128	84.38

==== Sixth session ====
The sixth session to elect a president was held on 17 November with the presence of 112 deputies. In the first (and only) round, Moawad received 43 votes, while 46 blank ballots were registered, 7 votes for Issam Khalifeh, 1 vote for former Minister Ziyad Baroud, 1 vote for MP Michel Daher and 1 vote for Suleiman Frangieh Jr. 9 MPs voted "New Lebanon" while 2 ballots were cancelled. As per the previous sessions, quorum was lost before a second round could be held, a seventh session was scheduled for Thursday 24 November.

First Round
Candidate	Party	Votes	%
Michel Moawad	IM	43	78.18
Issam Khalifeh	Ind.	7	12.73
Ziyad Baroud	Ind.	3	5.45
Suleiman Frangieh	Marada	1	1.82
Michel Daher	Ind.	1	1.82
Valid votes		55	49.11
Blank votes		46	41.07
Invalid votes		11	9.82
Total		112	100
Eligible voters/turnout		128	87.50

==== Seventh to eleventh session ====
No significant developments occurred between the seventh to eleventh sessions to elect a president. No candidate obtained a majority in the first rounds of the voting. As per the previous sessions, quorum was lost before a second round could be held.

The tenth session to elect a president was held on 15 December 2022. No candidate obtained a majority in the first round. The next session, scheduled for 12 January 2023, was postponed by the speaker due to the death of Hussein El-Husseini.

The eleventh session to elect a president was held on 19 January 2023. No candidate obtained a majority in the first round. As per the previous sessions, quorum was lost before a second round could be held. After the election two MPs from the Change Movement, Najat A. Saliba and Melhem Khalaf, locked themselves in parliament in protest.

Seventh session				Eighth session				Ninth session				Tenth session				Eleventh session			
24 November				1 December				8 December				15 December				19 January			
Candidate	Party	Votes	%	Candidate	Party	Votes	%	Candidate	Party	Votes	%	Candidate	Party	Votes	%	Candidate	Party	Votes	%
Michel Moawad	IM	42	82.35	Michel Moawad	IM	37	82.22	Michel Moawad	IM	39	78.00	Michel Moawad	IM	38	73.08	Michel Moawad	IM	34	75.55
Issam Khalifeh	Ind.	6	11.76	Issam Khalifeh	Ind.	4	8.88	Issam Khalifeh	Ind.	5	10.00	Issam Khalifeh	Ind.	8	15.38	Issam Khalifeh	Ind.	7	15.55
Ziyad Baroud	Ind.	2	3.92	Ziyad Baroud	Ind.	2	4.44	Bedri Daher	Ind.	3	6.00	Ziyad Baroud	Ind.	2	3.85	Ziyad Baroud	Ind.	2	4.44
Bedri Daher	Ind.	1	1.96	Bedri Daher	Ind.	1	2.22	Ziyad Baroud	Ind.	1	2.00	Salah Honein	Ind.	2	3.85	Salah Honein	Ind.	1	2.22
				Bechara Abi Younes	Ind.	1	2.22	Milad Abou Malhab	Ind.	1	2.00	Milad Abou Malhab	Ind.	1	1.92	Milad Abou Malhab	Ind.	1	2.22
								Salah Honein	Ind.	1	2.00	Chafic Merhi	Ind.	1	1.92				
Valid votes		51	46.36	Valid votes		45	40.54	Valid votes		50	47.62	Valid votes		52	47.71	Valid votes		45	40.54
Blank votes		50	45.45	Blank votes		52	46.84	Blank votes		39	37.14	Blank votes		37	33.94	Blank votes		37	33.33
Invalid votes		9	8.18	Invalid votes		14	12.61	Invalid votes		16	15.24	Invalid votes		20	18.35	Invalid votes		29	26.13
Total		110	100	Total		111	100	Total		105	100	Total		109	100	Total		111	100
Eligible voters/turnout		128	85.93	Eligible voters/turnout		128	86.71	Eligible voters/turnout		128	82.03	Eligible voters/turnout		128	85.16	Eligible voters/turnout		128	86.72

=== 2023 ===
==== Standoff and foreign delegation ====
After the eleventh electoral session, Speaker Nabih Berri announced he would hold off of calling a twelfth session to elect a president unless he sees what he deems as "a sort of agreement" on a candidate. In response, Change MPs, joined by multiple parties, called for consecutive and successive ballots to be held until a president is chosen. Two reformist deputies, Melhem Khalaf and Najat Saliba, staged a sit-in in the Chamber of Deputies until a new session is held and remained there until the election of Joseph Aoun.

In early June, the United States declared that it was thinking about imposing sanctions on individuals who had interfered with the election. Speaker Nabih Berri, who hadn't summoned a session since January, may have been referenced in this statement. Berri released a statement the next day in which he absolved himself of all blame for the obstruction. The international community urged Lebanon to pick a new president and carry out the reforms necessary to secure a financial bailout arrangement on numerous occasions.

In February 2023 officials from France, the United States, Saudi Arabia, Qatar, and Egypt met in Paris to discuss the presidential vacancy and political impasse that followed. The five came to be known as the "quintet". On 7 June 2023, French President Emmanuel Macron named Jean-Yves Le Drian as his personal envoy for Lebanon to end the political deadlock.

Hezbollah and the Amal Movement announced their endorsement for Suleiman Frangieh in the upcoming ballots. In parallel, an initiative led by independent MP Ghassan Skaff culminated in talks between opposition parties, taking advantage of the growing rift between the Free Patriotic Movement and Hezbollah and the warming of Syrian-Gulf diplomatic relations. With the support of Maronite Patriarch Bechara Boutros al-Rahi, it was announced in late May 2023 that the Lebanese Forces, the Kataeb, the FPM and the PSP had agreed to endorse the candidacy of IMF economist and former Minister of Finance Jihad Azour for the role of president.

==== Twelfth session ====
The twelfth session to elect a president was held on 14 June 2023. No candidate obtained a majority in the first round. As per the previous sessions, quorum was lost before a second round could be held after only 81 MPs remained in the room. However, Nabih Berri's choice of not conducting a second round was controversial since there had been a greater consensus between the MPs unlike the sessions before. It was also argued by numerous MPs that the round should have been cancelled or ballots recounted since the votes cast did not match the MPs present in the session. In that round, economist Jihad Azour received 60 votes, 51 votes for Suleiman Frangieh, 6 votes for former Interior Minister Ziyad Baroud, 1 vote for military general Joseph Aoun and 1 blank vote. 8 MPs voted "New Lebanon" while 1 ballot for controversial businessman and contractor Jihad Al Arab was cancelled as he is a Sunni Muslim. Finally, 1 ballot was counted as lost, before being counted to Jihad Azour.

First Round
Candidate	Party	Votes	%
Jihad Azour	Ind.	60	46.09
Suleiman Franjieh Jr.	Marada	51	39.84
Ziyad Baroud	Ind.	7	5.47
Joseph Aoun	Ind.	1	0.78
Valid votes		118	92.19
Blank votes		1	0.78
Invalid votes		9	7.03
Total		128	100
Eligible voters/turnout		128	100

==== Development ====
In July 2023, Naharnet reported that Qatar and the United States supported Aoun. In an interview Aoun said, "I don't care about [his candidacy], it doesn't concern me, no one has discussed it with me and I haven't discussed it with anyone".

Nabih Berri and Hezbollah nominated Georges Khoury, former ambassador to the Holy See, as a secondary option to Suleiman Frangieh. This was also reportedly proposed by Qatari mediation officials and even Najib Mikati. Leaders of the main opposition Christian Blocs, Samir Geagea and Sami Gemayel, reacted with refusal to negotiate with Hezbollah unless they let go of their primary candidate Frangieh. Nabih Berri called at the start of September 2024 for renewed Presidential elections.

=== 2024 ===
==== Announcements of candidacy ====
On 12 December, Frem officially declared his presidential candidacy; he proposed various reforms, and to implement the Taif agreement and UN Resolution 1701. On the same day, Geagea said he was prepared to stand given sufficient support.

==== Aoun endorsements ====
On 18 December, the Democratic Gathering bloc, led by the Progressive Socialist Party, which previously supported Azour, announced that it would support Aoun. Former PSP leader Walid Jumblat reportedly tried to convince Parliament Speaker Nabih Berri and his bloc to support Aoun. On 7 January, Jumblat restated the PSP's support for Aoun. Jumblat said that the a president should be selected in the first round of voting, before Trump's accession to office.

On 6 and 8 January, Frem and other "centrist" MPs, some of whom were formerly members of the FPM, said they would support Aoun if a consensus were reached on his election. Frem said he would continue his campaign if Aoun were not elected. The National Moderation bloc and Frangieh (who withdrew) also said they would support Aoun. On the same day, Berri's Amal said it would support Aoun if there were a majority in his favour. Ayoub Hamid, a member of Amal, said that "in principle" Amal and Hezbollah had a common position. Hezbollah had earlier said it would not veto Aoun's election.

On 7 January, Geagea said that Hezbollah was the main obstacle to Aoun's election, and that if they were to propose him, the Lebanese Forces would seriously consider his candidacy. On 8 January, An-Nahar reported that the Lebanese Forces appeared likely to support Aoun following a meeting between Aoun and Geagea. According to the same report, the Kataeb party and numerous independents associated with the 17 October Revolution were also likely to support Aoun. On 9 January, opposition groups including the Kataeb party, the Renewal bloc, and the Lebanese Forces issued a joint statement in support of Aoun.

==== Hezbollah and allies; international pressure ====
After the fall of the Assad regime, rebel leader and future Syrian President Ahmed al-Sharaa stated that Syria would no longer intervene in Lebanese affairs as Assad had, and would support Aoun if elected. On 16 December, Frangieh appeared to indicate his effective withdrawal; he admitted that his chances of success had weakened, which L'Orient–Le Jour interpreted as an allusion to the fall of Assad, and said he was open to any other appropriate candidate.

On 24 December 2024, five Sunni allies of Hezbollah indicated they would not support Frangieh and said they would support a compromise candidate of their own choosing.

On 5 January, Wafiq Safa, head of Hezbollah's liaison unit, said "we have already said we have no veto", and that "our only veto is against...Geagea", whose election would lead to "discord and destruction"; he also confirmed that Hezbollah would not veto Aoun. A spokesman for the Lebanese Forces denounced the remarks and called for Safa's arrest and prosecution.

On 20 December, L'Orient–Le Jour reported that after Jumblat's announcement of his support for Aoun, the FPM opposed his candidacy, and intended to publicly reject in the name of "Christian rights". On 31 December, Bassil, asked to choose between Aoun, Frangieh, and Geagea, said Geagea commanded popular support.

Saudi Arabia had openly supported Aoun's candidacy in a meeting with Berri, who responded that there was no consensus in his favour. Amos Hochstein visited Saudi Arabia and Qatar to confirm the unified support of the quintet for Aoun, before unambiguously indicating so, and visiting Berri at his headquarters in Ain el Tineh. Bassil also met Berri, and suggested Azour, the opposition's previous candidate, on the basis that nobody could oppose him; Berri proposed instead to wait to determine the level and direction of American pressure. Negotiators were also discussing whether the election of Aoun could be linked to guarantees to Iran, including freedom of movement for Hezbollah officials, a guarantee of its political influence, and the diminishing of military pressure on Iran.

According to a further report, members of the quintet including Saudi, American, and French envoys threatened that Lebanon would not receive any aid or attention unless Aoun were elected; Hezbollah, Amal, and the FPM sought to agree an alternative consensus candidate, but failed to do so.

=== 2025 ===
==== Thirteenth session ====
Following a ceasefire with Israel, Berri announced that parliament would convene to elect a president on 9 January 2025. This was the first session since Hezbollah was greatly weakened in its conflict with Israel and the fall of the Assad regime in Syria; both events influenced the political situation in Lebanon. Before the vote began, his election was heavily criticized by some opposition members who argued that the Lebanese constitution bars a sitting army commander from being elected president, though the ban has been waived multiple times, which prompted some MPs to cast protest votes.

In the first round, Joseph Aoun received 71 votes and jurist Chibli Mallat received two votes (reportedly from Melhem Khalaf and Osama Saad). Eighteen votes were invalid, including 14 MPs who cast a protest ballot for "Sovereignty and the Constitution" and 1 MP who voted for United States Senator Bernie Sanders (who is not eligible because he is neither a Lebanese citizen nor a Maronite Christian). 37 other MPs voted blank. Berri adjourned the session for two hours before the second round; in the first round 86 votes are needed to win, but in later rounds only 65. Hezbollah and Amal voted for Aoun in the second round. Aoun ended up winning with 99 votes.

First round				Second round			
Candidate	Party	Votes	%	Candidate	Party	Votes	%
Joseph Aoun	Independent	71	55.47%	Joseph Aoun	Independent	99	77.34%
Chibli Mallat	Independent	2	1.56%	Chibli Mallat	Independent	2	1.56%
Valid votes		73	57.03%	Valid votes		101	78.91%
Blank votes		37	28.9%	Blank votes		9	7.03%
Invalid votes		18	14.06%	Invalid votes		18	14.06%
Total		128	100%	Total		128	100%
Eligible voters/turnout		128	100%	Eligible voters/turnout		128	100%

== See also ==
- 2022 Lebanese general election
- 2022 Speaker of the Lebanese Parliament election
- Lebanese liquidity crisis
