= Forces of Change =

Parliamentary bloc in Lebanon

Forces of Change قوى التغيير
- Chamber: Parliament of Lebanon
- Foundation: 2022
- Member parties: Taqaddom; Lana; ReLebanon; Watani Alliance; Beirut Tuqawem; Osos Lebanon
- Representation: 9 / 128 (7%)
- Ideology: Reformism; Social democracy Secularism
- Political position: Centre-left

The Forces of Change (Arabic: قوى التغيير) is a parliamentary bloc in the Lebanese parliament which comprises multiple reformist parties and independent MPs. It originally consisted of 13 MPs following the 2022 Lebanese general election.

== Background ==
Many reformist groups emerged during the 2018 Lebanese general elections standing against the 9-year ruling and mostly repeat deputies in parliament and sought for change. Most notable of the group was the Kuluna Watani alliance. The alliance gathered with a new Political Party ("Sabaa") and 10 different campaigns and groups, most of which are connected to campaigns started in the protest movements of 2015 or the municipal elections of 2016. The alliance included in addition to Sabaa which is a nationwide secular Political Party few local political groups, namely Libaladi in Beirut 1 and Lihaqqi in Mount Lebanon 4. Speaking at an inauguration event, Charbel Nahas, whose party Citizens within a State joined the Koullouna Watani lists at a later stage, said the purpose of the lists was to provide an alternative to the "corrupted" power in Lebanese politics. The Shiite Taharror movement was also established in the wake of the protests.

== 2022 elections ==
During the 2022 Lebanese general elections, many activists and previous organizations expressed intent to run with goals of replacing the political class and reforming the country. These organizations include, Citizens in a State which ran under the Qadreen lists, Shamaluna which ran in the North III district and the Mada network which was made out of multiple smaller reform groups. Many older and tradition parties joined October 17 lists such as the historic National Bloc Party and the Lebanese Communist Party and other larger parties claimed to be members of the movement like the Kataeb party, the Independence Movement and the Popular Nasserist Organization (PNO).

In total, these candidates received 237,667 votes (13.14%) and won 13 seats which formed a new reformist bloc in the Lebanese parliament.

== Deputies ==
Name	Election Area	Political Affiliation	Seat
Cynthia Fadi Zarazir	Beirut 1	ReLebanon	Christian Minorities
Paula Sirakan Yacobian	Beirut 1	Tahalof Watani	Armenian Orthodox
Ibrahim Mneimneh	Beirut 2	Beirut Tuqawem	Sunni
Melhem Khalaf	Beirut 2	Independent	Greek Orthodox
~~Waddah Sadek~~	~~Beirut 2~~	~~Khatt Ahmar~~	~~Sunni~~
Rami Fanj	North 2 - Tripoli	Independent	Sunni
~~Michel Chawki El Doueihy~~	~~North 3 - Zgharta~~	~~Osos Lebanon~~	~~Maronite~~
Halima Ibrahim Kaakour	Mount Lebanon 4 - Chouf	Lana	Sunni
Mark Bahjat Daou	Mount Lebanon 4 - Chouf	Taqqadum	Druze
Najat Saliba	Mount Lebanon 4 - Chouf	Taqqadum	Maronite
Elias Fares Jradeh	South 3 - Marjeyoun-Hasbaya	Independent	Greek Orthodox
Firas Ismail Hamdan	South 3 - Marjeyoun-Hasbaya	Independent	Druze
Yassin Yassin	Bekaa 2 - West Bekaa-Rashaya	Independent	Sunni

=== Activities ===
Along with many others, it was in nature for October 17 MPs to opt out on voting for long-time speaker Nabih Berri. For the deputy speaker the MPs voted for newly elected MP Ghassan Skaff however he still lost to long-time politician Elias Bou Saab.

The 2 secretaries of parliament were elected immediately after the Deputy Speaker. Although not constitutionally required, it was decided that the secretaries would be attributed to one Maronite Christian and one Druze. The election process of the 2 deputies had large debate particularly by opposition MPs. It was suggested that each MP votes for both preferences in the same ballot and that the positions should not be based on religion. However, it was decided that voting would take place on the basis of one name per ballot. As a result of this Firas Hamdan, an opposition MP, who was one of few candidates for the Druze secretary, withdrew his candidacy in protest of the sectarian electoral procedure.

==== Disputes and withdrawals ====
The newly formed bloc continuously faced disagreements with each other, like voting on the premiership and the presidency, failure to create common grounds with other parliamentary blocs and failing to unite with the parliament opposition. This led to the withdrawal of 2 MPs from the bloc, Michel Doueihy of Osos Lebanon and Waddah Sadek of Khatt Ahmar, both citing political tensions.

== See also ==
- 17 October Revolution
