= Melhem Khalaf =

Lebanese lawyer and politician

- ملحم خلف
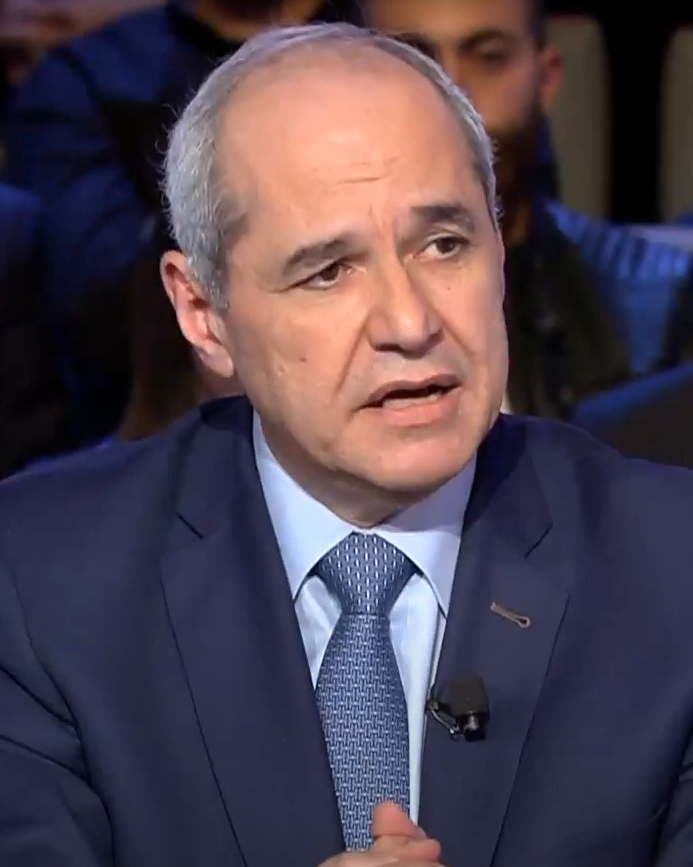
- Khalaf in 2019

Member of the Lebanese Parliament
- Incumbent
- Assumed office 21 May 2022
- Constituency: Beirut II (2022)

Personal details
- Born: January 20, 1962 (age 64) Ras Beirut, Beirut
- Party: Independent
- Other political affiliations: Forces of Change Bloc
- Education: University of Montpellier; Saint Joseph University of Beirut
- Occupation: Lawyer, politician, activist

Melhem Emile Khalaf (Arabic: ملحم خلف) is a Lebanese lawyer, politician and human rights activist. He is currently a member of the Lebanese parliament since 2022, as part of the Forces of Change bloc, and was president of the Beirut Bar Association between 2019 and 2021.

== Early life ==
Melhem Khalaf was born in the Ras Beirut neighborhood of Beirut, Lebanon on January 20, 1962 to a Greek Orthodox family of lawyers from Baskinta. He received his secondary education in the Collège Notre Dame de Jamhour. After obtaining a law degree from Saint Joseph University of Beirut, he continued his studies at the University of Montpellier in France where he obtained a doctorate in law.

== Career ==
Khalaf was registered as a trainee lawyer in the Beirut Bar Association. He then moved to the general roll, practicing the profession in his office in Beirut. He has been involved in union work since his membership, through his appointment to several committees within the association. In 1985, during the Lebanese Civil War, he founded a politically and religiously independent Lebanese non-governmental called Offrejoie aimed to unite Lebanese youth during times of sectarian conflict. It was created after Khalaf's experience as a Lebanese Red Cross volunteer in which they saw people's suffrage during the war.

Since 1990, he has been a professor at the Faculty of Law and Political Science at Saint Joseph University. He also participated in the discussion of theses for the award of a doctorate in law at Lebanese and French universities.

The United Nations General Assembly elected Khalaf in 2015 as a member of the International Committee on the Elimination of Racial Discrimination in Geneva, and in 2017, he was elected vice-president of this committee.

During the 2019 Beirut Bar Association elections Khalaf ran as an independent candidate and won with 2,341 votes, defeating candidates backed by major political parties. Khalaf's contenders were Nader Gaspard, Saadeddine Al Khatib, and Ibrahim Moussallem. Pierre Hanna, who was backed by the Lebanese Forces, Progressive Socialist Party and the Future Movement, as well as twelve other candidates who either dropped out or were not voted in, competed for council positions. This occurred during the 17 October Revolution were protested called for the removal of Lebanon's ruling class. As Bar Association president, Khalaf advocated for reforms to the legal system and pushed for greater independence of the judiciary. He sought to distance the Bar Association from political interference.

=== Lebanese parliament ===
Khalaf ran as an independent candidate in the 2022 parliamentary elections for the Greek Orthodox seat in the Beirut II district as part of a list made up of independent candidates and 17 October activists. He managed to win the seat with 7,141 votes along with Ibrahim Mneimneh and Waddah Sadek.

Melhem Khalaf became widely known for his 722-day sit-in at the Lebanese Parliament, which he began on January 19, 2023, in an effort to pressure lawmakers into electing a new president after Lebanon had been without one since October 31, 2022. Khalaf, alongside fellow Change MP Najat Saliba, aimed to end the political deadlock that had gripped the country. While Saliba ended her sit-in after eight months, Khalaf continued until the election of Army Commander Gen. Joseph Aoun as president. After the election, Khalaf was seen leaving Parliament with suitcases, wearing a scarf in the colours of the Lebanese flag, and was accompanied by other MPs from the October 7, 2019, protest movement.

== See also ==
- List of members of the 2022–2026 Lebanese Parliament
- Forces of Change
