= Telecommunications Regulatory Authority =

Telecommunications Regulatory Authority may refer to:

- Telecommunications Regulatory Authority of Bahrain
- Telecommunications Regulatory Authority of Lebanon
- Telecom Regulatory Authority of India
- Nepal Telecommunications Authority
- Telecommunications Regulatory Authority (UAE)
