= Offrejoie =

Lebanese humanitarian organization

- Logotype of Offrejoie.
- Founded at: Lebanon
- Region served: Lebanon, Iraq
- Website: www.offrejoie.org

Offrejoie (English translation: "joy of giving") is a politically and religiously independent Lebanese non-governmental humanitarian organisation, founded in 1985 by lawyer Dr. Melhem Emile Khalaf, Walid Arnaout, Mohammad Hamade, Paul Nassar and Nadim Souhaid. Founded in the values of love, respect, and forgiveness, their mission being to "gather the Lebanese family creating oasis dating for young people throughout Lebanon by mobilizing around social projects promoting the unity of the Lebanese people."

Since 2012, it is also operating in Iraq on the same grounds.

== History ==
In 1982, Mohamad Hamade, Walid Arnaout, Paul Nassar and Melhem Khalaf, four young volunteers of the Lebanese Red Cross hailing from different religious communities, assisted the wounded during the war. Horrified by what they saw, they wanted to act in favour of the children suffering from the violence and misery of war. Nadim Souhaid joined them.

== Organisation ==
The NGO is currently presided by Melhem Khalaf.

=== Mission ===
Founded in the values of love, respect, and forgiveness, their alleged mission is as below:

- Combat individualism by becoming aware of the need to live in a just and peaceful society
- Give the other what they would receive
- Connecting beyond his community of birth
- Deciding to face the future together
- Search-reciprocal esteem.
- Develop social solidarity

== Recognition ==
Offrejoie was knighted with the National Order of the Cedar on 6 March 2013. It also received the Peace Prize of Lebanon in 2014 from the Ghazal Foundation and Fondation de France on 28 March 2014.
