= Lana (political party) =

Lana لَــنا
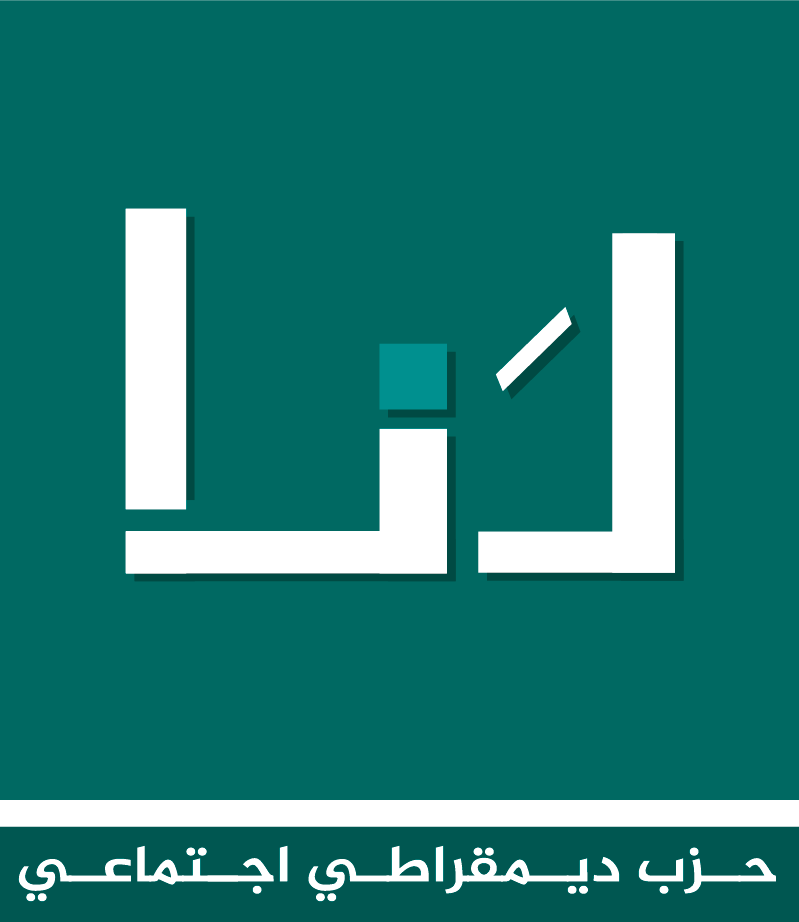
- Founded: 2022
- Ideology: Reformism; Social democracy
- Political position: Centre-left
- Parliament of Lebanon: 1 / 128

Website
- https://lnalebanon.org/

Lana, officially Lana – Social Democratic Party (Arabic: لـنا – حزب ديمقراطي اجتماعي; lit. 'For us') is a reformist political party founded in Lebanon which was established on the basis of the 17 October Revolution.

== 2022 general elections ==
During the 2022 Lebanese general election the party ran in Mount Lebanon 4 (Aley – Chouf) district with the candidate Halime Kaakour who was part of the "Tawahadna Lel Taghyeer" list where she ran for the Sunni seat. The list was made up of other reformists such as those in the Taqaddom Party and independent candidates of the 17 October Revolution. They aimed to change the current status quo as those in the current government are deemed as responsible for driving the country into the state of economic collapse due to mismanagement and corruption. Halime Kaakour won her seat with 6,684 votes, becoming one of only eight women to win a seat in the 2022 parliamentary elections.
