= Ziad Hayek =

Lebanese businessman

Ziad-Alexandre Hayek
- زياد حايك
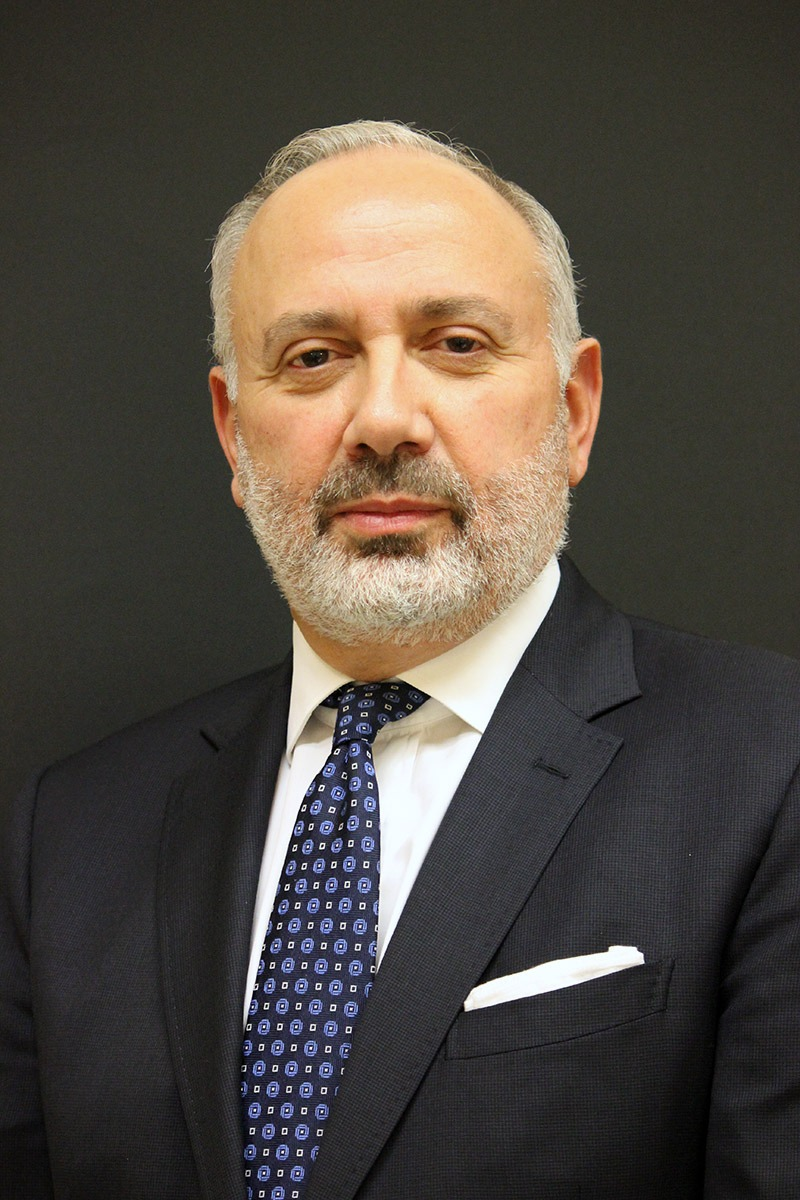

President of the World Association of PPP Units & Professionals
- Incumbent
- Assumed office 2018

Vice Chair of the United Nations Economic Commission for Europe Working Party on PPP
- Incumbent
- Assumed office 2017

Secretary General of the High Council of Privatization and PPP
- In office 2006–2019

Personal details
- Born: January 27, 1959 (age 67) Beit Chabeb, Lebanon
- Citizenship: American, British, Lebanese
- Party: Independent
- Spouse: Soheila Youssefzadeh
- Children: Gisèle; Daniel

Ziad-Alexandre Hayek (Arabic: زياد حايك; born on 27 January 1959) was Secretary General of the Republic of Lebanon's High Council for Privatization and PPP from 2006 until he was nominated to be President of the World Bank in February 2019. In 2014, he was made Officer of the National Order of the Cedar, the highest state order of Lebanon. He is married to Soheila Hayek, the global president of YMCA.

== Early life ==
Hayek was born in Beit Chabeb, Mount Lebanon. He attended the Collège Mariste Champville and graduated with a Baccalauréat degree in Experimental Sciences. His father, Salah Youssef Hayek, an amateur boxer and actor turned industrialist, and his mother, Essaaf Hanna Hayek, decided to flee Lebanon with their children during one of the fiercest battles of the Lebanese Civil War in 1976. They boarded a boat that took them to Cyprus. The family later settled in Monterrey, Mexico, where Hayek attended university at the Instituto Tecnológico y de Estudios Superiores de Monterrey (ITESM). Then, the family emigrated again, this time to Houston, Texas, where Hayek attended the University of Houston. Hayek went on to attend the University of Texas at Dallas and graduated with a master’s degree in International Management.

== Career ==
=== Manama, Libreville, and New York ===
Hayek joined Citibank in 1981 as a foreign exchange trader in Bahrain and later as Acting Regional Treasurer for West Africa in Gabon. He moved back to New York in 1988, where he worked in the International Corporate Finance Division and led the team that devised complex structured finance transactions, including debt-for-equity swaps and the restructuring and repackaging of the debt of several Latin American countries. Hayek was later promoted to head the International Securitization Department, which developed the securitization of future receivables transactions from credit cards, telecommunications, airline ticket sales, and mineral and oil exports.

Hayek joined Salomon Brothers Inc. in 1992 where he led various financings for Latin America and with his boss Thomas Enders established relations with the anti-Apartheid movement in South Africa before the fall of the Apartheid regime. He then played an important role in the re-entry of the country in the international capital markets by launching first South African equity funds.

=== Paris and Mexico City ===
In 1994, Hayek re-joined his Citibank team as Managing Director and Partner in Indosuez Capital Latin America, the partnership they established with Banque Indosuez, Paris. After being named President of Indosuez Mexico, S.A. de C.V. he moved to Mexico and headed the Bank's corporate finance activities and its equity, fixed income, futures and options trading business. He oversaw the Partnership's operations in northern Latin America, advised the Mexican Government on the peso crisis and contributed in the return of Mexican companies to the commercial paper market.

=== New York and London ===
In 1997, Hayek became Senior Managing Director at Bear Stearns, where he oversaw emerging markets’ telecom investment banking, and working with Grupo Carso of Mexican businessman Carlos Slim Helu, led, among other, the IPO of Prodigy Communications Corporation on the NYSE. After moving to London to expand Bear Stearns' European business, he co-founded Lonbridge Associates in 2003 before joining the Lebanese government in 2006.

=== Lebanon ===
On June 1, 2006, the Council of Ministers of Lebanon appointed Hayek to the quasi ministerial-level position of Secretary General of the High Council for Privatization. As such, he reported to the Prime Minister and was responsible of managing operations of the Council, which is chaired by the Prime Minister and includes the Minister of Finance, the Minister of Economy, the Minister of Labor and the Minister of Justice.

One month after his return to Lebanon war broke out with Israel. Hayek found himself unexpectedly a member of the very small team, which was leading the country during wartime and which was engaged in international negotiations to achieve a ceasefire. As soon as hostilities ceased in mid-August, PM Siniora tasked Hayek with the responsibility of organizing a donors’ conference in Stockholm, at the invitation of the Swedish Government, to raise funds to help Lebanon recover from the war. The conference became a great success as US$940 million were raised, in record time, by the end of that same month.

Closing the war chapter, Hayek moved fast to work on privatizing the country's telecom sector, in cooperation with the newly appointed Telecom Regulatory Authority. Although major progress had been achieved on that front and everything was ready to launch the privatization auction by February 2008, the Council of Ministers did not approve the launch fearing that the vacant Presidency of the Republic might affect the auction results. Hayek had also worked on PPP initiatives in the power sector. By end-April 2008, bids were received for the tender to build and operate a smart metering network for the power utility and a tender document was ready for the launch of a tender to build a 500MW IPP power plant in Deir Amaar. The events of 7 May 2008 unfortunately derailed those tenders and the subsequent government refused to let the private sector play a role in the power sector. There were however, two positive outcomes from that period: The first is that the power sector reform plan that Hayek had written in 2008 became the main basis for the Lebanese Government power sector reform paper of 2010,. The second positive outcome was that the Council of Ministers approved in June 2007 the PPP draft law that Hayek had proposed.

The third positive outcome was that Hayek as Vice-Chair of the United Nations Economic Commission for Europe nter of Excellence in PPP for Maritime Ports until a decade later, in 2017, a period during which Hayek campaigned for its passage by lobbying decision makers, by leading awareness-raising campaigns and by speaking at conferences, workshops, academic, social, political and economic gatherings. When he had first presented his PPP vision, most political parties either did not know what PPP is or were against it. Yet a decade later every major party had adopted PPP as an integral part of its platform. The passage of the PPP Law in 2017 meant success in setting a new direction for the country's economic future.

Since the PPP Law was enacted, Hayek participated in the design of Lebanon's Capital Investment Plan and in organizing the Conférence économique pour le développement par les réformes et avec les entreprises (CEDRE), which was held in Paris in April 2018 and which saw the international community pledge US$11.8 billion in concessional financing to help Lebanon build much-needed infrastructure. The HCP team have been entrusted with the execution of a number of projects, including the expansion of the Beirut Rafic Hariri International Airport, the construction Khladeh-Dbayeh-Oqaibeh toll road, and the establishment of the national data center and the Lebanon Cloud

Although the PPP Law did not require it, Hayek worked hand in hand with civil society in Lebanon and invited a number of civil society organizations to form Transparency and Fairness Civil Society Project Audit Committees to supervise the HCP's activities in tendering PPP projects. The Lebanese Transparency Association is leading this effort under the aegis of Transparency International. Participating NGOs include: ALDIC, LCPS, LIOG, Nahnoo.

In 2019, Lebanon nominated Hayek for World Bank's Presidency. The Lebanese Government withdrew Hayek's nomination in March 2019. The Lebanese press reported that Prime Minister Saad Hariri informed the Council of Ministers that the decision to withdraw the nomination was taken due to foreign pressure.

Hayek is currently Head of the International Center of Excellence in PPP for Ports, Member of the Board of Trustees of the Holy Spirit University of Kaslik, Member of the Investment Committee of World YMCA, and High Commissioner for Lebanon at the World Business Angels Investment Forum.

=== WAPPP ===
He is the President of the World Association of Public-Private Partnerships (WAPPP), the largest PPP organization in the world, based in Geneva, Switzerland.

=== HyperCycle ===
He is the Head of Global Alliances at HyperCycle.ai and helped countries like Paraguay leverage AI for economic and societal gains through global AI collaborations.

=== Nomination for Presidency ===
In 2022 Hayek announced his candidacy for Lebanon's presidency. He proposes an economic recovery plan that includes converting bank deposits into tradeable certificates, leveraging gold reserves, and improving tax collection. Hayek also emphasizes the importance of strengthening ties with Gulf Cooperation Council countries, particularly through opportunities like Saudi Arabia's Vision 2030, to boost Lebanon's economy. Amid the ongoing conflict between Hezbollah and Israel, he expresses hope that full-scale war can be avoided, advocating for a focus on long-term peace and stability.

== Personal life ==
Hayek has two children with his wife, Soheila Youssefzadeh Hayek: Gisèle and Daniel.

A citizen of the US, the UK and Lebanon, Hayek speaks 11 languages. He is fluent in Arabic, English, French, Spanish, Portuguese and familiar with Italian, Persian, German, Russian, Hebrew and Aramaic. He has been a resident of Lebanon, Mexico, Bahrain, Gabon, the US, the UK, and Cyprus.
