= May Rihani =

Lebanese writer and poet

May Rihani is a Lebanese author, international development expert, and politician. She was born in Beirut, though her family hails from Freike, Matn District, Lebanon. She is an expert on girls' education and women's empowerment. She worked in more than 40 countries in Africa, the Middle East, and Asia and visited 30 more to implement educational reform and in particular improve girls' education. She was a Senior Vice President of three leading US organizations that worked in International Development: Family Health International (FHI 360), the Academy for Educational Development (AED), and Creative Associates International. Ms Rihani served as the co-chair of the United Nations Girls' Education Initiative (UNGEI) between 2008 and 2010. She is fluent in Arabic, French and English. She published 9 books, 3 in Arabic and 6 in English; she is also the editor or co-editor of 4 English books. Two of her English books are translated into: French, Spanish, Arabic, and Persian.

She assumed a position as director of the Kahlil Gibran Chair for Values and Peace at the University of Maryland, College Park, in early 2016. She was a candidate for the 2022–2025 Lebanese presidential election, and has sought support from opposing parties, independent MPs, and thirteen reformist deputies as well as the Lebanese diaspora.

== Career ==
In 2016, Rihani was appointed the director of the George and Lisa Zakhem Kahlil Gibran Chair for Values of Peace at the University of Maryland. She served as director of the Gibran Chair for Values and Peace at the University of Maryland until 2020.

== Published works ==
Rihani has published nine books and co-edited four.

In her English language books, she focuses on "addressing girl's education, women's empowerment and global human development". Two of her major books are Learning for the 21st Century: Girl's Education in the Middle East and North Africa, which was translated by UNICEF to French, Arabic and Persian; and Keeping the Promise: Five benefits of Girls Secondary Education. In addition, she authored Cultures Without Borders: From Beirut to Washington, D.C., a memoir.

The three Arabic books that she wrote are mainly poetry that discuss "love, Lebanon and global common ground". They are: Yalouffou Khasr al-Ard (Encircling the Waist of the Earth); Ismi Siwaya (My Name Is The Other); Hafrun ’Ala Al-Ayyam (Engraving on Time)].

== Tribute ==
In tribute to Rihani's success and prosperous career, AUB established a scholarship fund called, "May Rihani Endowed Scholarship Fund". This fund is supported by Rihani's family, friends, and colleagues. The primary purpose of this fund is to provide financial assistance for outstanding women students at AUB.

== Honors, awards and distinctions ==
- 2019, "Femmes Partenaires du Progres" award
- 2015, "ADC Women’s Empowerment Forum Leadership" award.
- The Juliet Hollister Temple of Understanding Award: New York, October 2012.
- Leadership Award of the Center for Women's Leadership in International Development: Creative Associates International Inc., Washington, D.C., March 2012
- Legacy Award: Academy for Educational Development, Washington, D.C., June 2011.
- The Khalil Gibran International Award: University of Maryland, April 2008.
- Said Akl Award: Beirut, Lebanon, June 2004.
- Capital Area Peacemaker Award: School of International Service, American University, Washington, D.C., March 1998.
