= Mark Daou =

Lebanese politician

- Born: 1979 (age 46–47); Sidon, Lebanon
- Occupation: MP in the Lebanese Parliament
- Political party: Taqaddom (Lebanon)
- Movement: 17 October Revolution

Mark Daou (born 1979) is a Lebanese activist and public relations expert who has been a member of the Lebanese Parliament since 2022 .

== Early life and education ==
Mark Daou was born in Sidon, to a family which originates from the village of Zaraaoun, in the Matn Region. Daou and his family fled Sidon in 1983 to Choueifat following the Israeli invasion of Lebanon. He attended the International School of Choueifat (also known as SABIS). Daou became a professional swimmer, and he excelled in nationwide swimming championships and competitions. He made it to the national swimming team by age 18 and later participated in three world university championships, and the Arab Games. Daou studied business administration at the American University of Beirut (1997-2000). He stayed on for an extra year to take courses, eventually enrolling in the sociology graduate program at AUB. He eventually went on to earn a master’s degree in political sociology from the London School of Economics (2006-2007).

== Career ==
Mark Daou is a public relations expert. He was first employed by advertising agency TBWA before moving on to London to complete his master’s degree. After graduation, Daou worked with an economic information provider, “Business Monitor international.” In 2008, Daou was employed again by TBWA to manage their offices in Yemen and Sudan before moving on to Afghanistan. By end of 2010, Daou and several associates founded a new company called RPR, for which he served as CEO. Daou eventually bought out his partners and continued to run RPR until he was elected to parliament in 2022.

=== Community activism ===
By mid-2012, Daou’s political involvement increased in the wake of the Arab Spring. By the end of the year along with a group of friends, he decided to contest the 2013 parliamentary elections. He intended to run as a candidate for the Druze seat in Aley. The reason for the choice of that district was that it was the only district in Lebanon that the establishment lists were not filled, but had 4 candidates for 5 seats, which opened a window of opportunity for an independent candidate. The elections were subsequently postponed until 2018. In addition, several campaigns were kicked off in the district mainly the “Close the Naameh Landfill”. The Naameh landfill campaign took a life of its own and youth from villages and towns across the Aley and Shouf region started pouring into street protests. The work with the grassroots and activists continued and materialized by the formation of several local NGOs in the region.

==== “You Stink” 2015 ====
The work on the Naameh landfill escalated with the decision to shut it down in July 2015. The garbage crisis led to a mass movement, in which Daou was heavily involved in with the coordination committee that worked out the movement’s decisions and steps. Daou played a role in negotiating the deals between the various groups. He was also regularly hosted on TV, radio and other media shows to talk on behalf of the movement.

== Politics ==
Daou’s political induction happened at AUB. In 1998, he joined a small group of leftist students, “No Frontiers” which competed with sectarian parties. Daou contested elections for five cycles. In 2001, he won the presidency of the Student Representative council of the Faculty of Arts and Sciences. By the year 2000 and 2001, the leftist student groups had branched into several universities in Lebanon and had successfully started coordinating together and launched several campaigns focusing on student and nationwide politics. Afterwards, Daou became involved in a nascent movement called the Democratic Left Movement. A group of intellectuals, politicians and activists were seriously discussing the formation of a new political party, which included illustrious names like Samir Kassir, Ziad Majed, Elias Atallah and many others were involved. Student political groups were approached, and Daou was one of three people involved in the discussions of the time. He would eventually be one of the 20 signatories of the formation of this new political party. The formation process was across Lebanon and culminated in electoral campaigns in municipal elections in 2004, and Daou was heavily involved in the campaigns of the Southern districts, particularly in Khiam.

=== Beirut Municipal Elections (2016) ===
As the “You Stink” protests started winding down, Daou and several others, mainly involved with the Aley campaign, started discussing the municipal elections. As part of Beirut Madinati, Daou took on the campaigning in Aley. From September 2015 till May 2016, he was engaged with Beirut Madinati and the Choueifat municipal elections. In Beirut Madinati Daou served as an electoral advisor and media consultant. He was also heavily involved in setting up the electoral team and the election day strategy.

=== October 17 and Buildup to 2022 Elections ===
On October 17, 2019, Lebanese citizens flooded the streets, demanding socioeconomic reforms. Daou participated in nearly the entirety of the protests. During this period, Daou organized protests, gave interviews, and connected with activists. He also worked as an anchor for a news show on Al-Jadeed, called Al-Badeel (The Alternative). In the meantime, Daou and others helped co-found Taqaddom (Progress), a new reformist political party in Lebanon. It currently has 2 seats in the Lebanese parliament. In the aftermath of the August 4 explosion, Daou assisted in medical assistance efforts, and providing temporary shelter for those whose houses were destroyed or damaged.

=== Member of Parliament (2022-present) ===
In late 2021, Daou and several activists in the Aley-Chouf area, as part of a nationwide drive to elect new “change” MPs, formed an electoral list known as “United for Change”. As the campaign gained increasing traction, especially among the diaspora, the list was attacked by partisans of the Progressive Socialist Party and other establishment parties. Daou’s campaign would go on to win forty-two thousand votes. He would personally win eleven thousand votes, beating established feudal politician Talal Arslan for the Druze seat in Aley. Daou entered Parliament as part of the “Change” bloc, which included thirteen people. However, from the start, this bloc was fraught with radical differences, specifically regarding social issues, economic reform, and the weapons of Hezbollah.

== Personal life ==
Daou was married in 2023 to Christiana Parreira, a professor of political science at the Geneva Graduate Institute (IHEID).

== See also ==
- Parliament of Lebanon
- 2022 Lebanese general election
