= Taqaddom (Lebanon) =

Progress تقدم
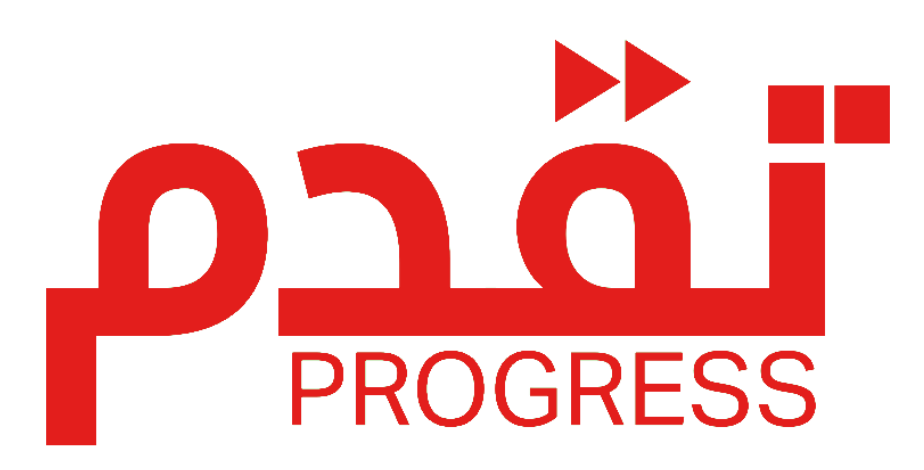
- Leader: Laury Haytayan
- Founded: March 2020
- Headquarters: Beirut
- Ideology: Reformism; Social democracy Secularism
- Political position: Centre-left
- Colours: Red; Green
- Parliament of Lebanon: 2 / 128

Website
- https://taqaddomlb.org/home

Taqaddom or Taqaddum (Arabic: تقدم; lit. 'Progress') is a reformist political party in Lebanon founded under the basis of the 17 October Revolution. It currently has 2 seats in the Lebanese parliament, which is part of a 13 member reformist bloc, with the likes of Najat Aoun Saliba of the Chouf district and Mark Daou of the Aley district.

== 2022 Lebanese general elections ==
Like many other candidates in its region, the party was known for its anti-Hezbollah sentiment. It presented 2 candidates and managed to win both seats in the Mount Lebanon IV electoral district with 20,988 votes together.
