= Taharror =

Taharror (Arabic: تحرر) is a political movement in Lebanon advocating for modernism, liberalism, and state sovereignty while emphasizing the importance of Lebanese national identity over sectarian divisions. Founded in October 2023, following the 17 October Revolution protests, Taharror aims to position itself as the primary Shiite opposition group, challenging the dominance of Hezbollah and Amal. The movement particularly opposes allowing a non-state and foreign-funded actor (Hezbollah) to involve Lebanon in a war it says the majority of Lebanese do not want. The Shia group further objects to the Iranian doctrine of velayat e-faqih, subscribed to by Hezbollah. Originated by the first Supreme Leader of the Islamic Republic of Iran, Ayatollah Ruhollah Khomeini, the doctrine teaches that the Supreme Leader of Iran is the earthly representative of the "hidden imam," Mohammad al-Mahdi, the 12th successor of the prophet Mohammad, who disappeared in 939, and whose return is supposed to put an end to oppression around the world.

From its founding, Taharror has emphasized its opposition to Israeli policy in Palestine, while stressing that Lebanon's role in the conflict should be diplomatic rather than military and that the Palestinian cause should not be used to promote Iranian domination of the Arab world. Taharror supports the Arab Peace Initiative as a path to the establishment of a Palestinian state. According to co-founder Hadi Murad, "Lebanon cannot be dissociated from the Arab world to the benefit of Iran."

== Founders ==
The founders of the movement include Lebanese University Professor Ali Khalifé, physician, activist Hadi Murad, who previously spearheaded the anti-Hezbollah "White Coats Organization" criticizing Hezbollah management of health care, and Muhammad Awad. Among those with whom Taharror seeks to work is Sheikh Ali El-Amin, former Shiite Mufti and longstanding clerical critic of Hezbollah.

== Principles ==
Taharror operates on a set of ten fundamental principles:

1. Political Differentiation: Rejecting sectarian reductionism.
2. Establishing Order: Opposing obstructive practices.
3. Diversity within National Unity: Objecting to parallel state systems.
4. Comprehensive National Issues: Challenging the concept of a "resistance group"
5. Religiosity as Personal Choice: Criticizing "Safavi Shiism".
6. Jurisprudence Free from Ambition: Opposing the general guardianship of the jurist.
7. Jurisprudence Free from Rigidity: Resisting subordination to established authorities.
8. Flexible Jurisprudence: Objecting to injustices in personal status cases.
9. Embracing Modernity: Advocating for contemporary issues beyond religious constraints.
10. Restoring Lebanon's International Role: Opposing marginalization on regional and global platforms.

Taharror is committed to reforming Shiite politics in Lebanon, promoting individual freedoms, and improving Lebanon's standing in the international arena.
