= Naharnet =

Lebanese daily newspaper

- Type: Daily
- Format: Online newspaper
- Founded: 2000; 25 years ago
- Language: Arabic; English
- Website: www.naharnet.com

Naharnet is a Lebanese online newspaper, launched in September 2000.
