= Sajih Atiyah =

Sajih Atiyah, also known as Sajeeh Atteya and Sajih Mkhayel Attieh, is a Lebanese politician. He is member of the Parliament of Lebanon, and he chair the Public Works and Energy Committee.
