= Farid Elias Khazen =

Lebanese politician (born 1960)

Farid Elias Khazen (also Farid Elias el-Khazen Arabic: فريد إلياس الخازن) is a Lebanese politician and professor of political science at the American University of Beirut. He has been a member of the Lebanese Parliament and ambassador to the Holy See since 2018.

== Education ==
Farid el Khazen studied Architecture and Social Sciences at the American University of Beirut from 1977 to 1979. He then received his MA and, subsequently, a PhD in International Relations from the Johns Hopkins University, School of Advanced International Studies (SAIS) in 1988. He also earned a bachelor's degree in economics from Missouri State University. In addition, he briefly joined the graduate program at Cornell University.

== Career ==
Farid el Khazen had been a professor of politics, and from 2000 to 2005 Chairman of the Department of Political Studies and Public Administration at the American University of Beirut. He also edited academic journals and reviewed articles and book manuscripts submitted for publication. He was a member of the Lebanese Parliament (2005-2018) and member of the Foreign Affairs, and Education and Culture parliamentary committees. He took part in six parliamentary delegations that visited European countries. He was an independent MP and member of the parliamentary coalition headed by General Michel Aoun. He did not run in the 2018 election. He received over 53% of the vote in his district (Keserwan) in the general election of 2009, and 60% of the vote in the general election of 2005. He makes regular media appearances, discussing a variety of topics.

In late August 2018, Farid el Khazen was appointed Ambassador of Lebanon to the Holy See and presented his Letters of Credentials to Pope Francis on November 5, 2018. In March 2021, he received a Papal decoration Knight of the Grand Cross of the Piano Order (of Pius IX) and, prior to that, an award conferred by the Italian Accademia Bonifaciana in February 2020. He organized, in February 2022, in collaboration with the Holy Spirit University in Lebanon, an international conference on Pope John Paul II's 1989 message on Lebanon. Archbishop Paul Gallagher, Vatican Secretary for Relations with States, delivered the opening speech at the conference.

== Personal life ==
He is married to Soula Elie Salibi and have three children.

== Publications ==
Dr.el Khazen has written numerous books, academic articles, and essays in English, Arabic and French, including:

- The Breakdown of the State in Lebanon, 1967-1976 (Harvard University Press and I.B.Tauris, 2000). Translated Arabic version (2002)appeared in three editions. Paperback edition (with a new introduction) published by I.B.Tauris in 2021.
- Parliamentary Elections in Postwar Lebanon: Democracy With No choice (Dar al-Nahar, 2000) - in Arabic.
- Lebanon's Political Parties and the Limit of Democratic Practice (Beirut: LCPS, 2002) - in Arabic.
- The Communal Pact of National Identities: The Making and Politics of the 1943 National Pact (Oxford: Centre for Lebanese Studies, 1991).
- Over 20 articles published in academic journals, in addition to several book chapters.
- Contributed essays to The Encyclopedia of Islam (3rd edition, 2019) and to The Oxford Encyclopedia of the Modern Islamic World (1995).
- Contributed over 200 essays and editorials to Lebanese and Arab dailies (al-Hayat, al-Safir, al-Nahar) and other media outlets in Europe and the United States.
