= Telecommunications Regulatory Authority of Lebanon =

Regulatory body for telecommunications in Lebanon

Lebanese Republic Telecommunications Regulatory Authority (TRA)
- الهيئة المنظّمة للإتصالات
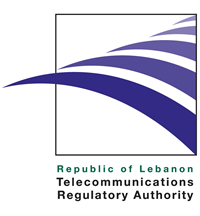
- Logo

Agency overview
- Headquarters: Beirut Central District (Lebanon)
- Agency executive: Imad Y. HOBALLAH, (Chairman & CEO)
- Website: http://www.tra.gov.lb/

The Telecommunications Regulatory Authority of Lebanon is an independent public institution established by Law 431/2002 and legally mandated to liberalize, regulate, and develop telecommunications in Lebanon. The TRA effectively started operations upon the nomination of its board members in February 2007.

The TRA's mission is to promote competition and ensure the rights of users of telecommunications services are respected. Through appropriate regulation, the TRA promotes investment and maintains stability in the market. The TRA issues licenses, regulations, and decisions, manages the spectrum and the numbering plan, monitors the market for any abuse of dominant market position and anti-competitive practices, and takes remedial action when necessary. The TRA is also responsible for maintaining stability in the market and developing the sector—while at the same time, building a thriving, competitive and innovative telecommunications market.

== Duties and regulatory principles ==
The Telecommunications Regulatory Authority (TRA) was established in accordance with Law 431 of 2002 as an independent public institution assigned to liberalize, regulate, and develop telecommunications in Lebanon.

The TRA's duties are set out in full in Law 431/2002. These include to:

- Encourage competition in the fields of telecom
- Ensure market transparency
- Monitor tariffs and prevent non-competitive behaviour
- Act as a mediator and arbitration organism and to resolve disputes arising between licensees
- Prepare draft decrees and regulations
- Organize concessions, issue licenses, amend, suspend, withdraw and supervise execution of these concessions and licenses
- Establish rules of interconnection and review contracts of interconnection
- Formulate technical standards and procedures for monitoring compliance with these standards
- Formulate standards and procedures for review of complaints and/or requests that might arise out of the present law and their resolution
- Protect telecommunications consumers and facilitate the use of telecom by educational and health care institutions and disabled persons

== Units ==
The TRA consists of four main units which fall under the supervision of the TRA chairman. Each unit is headed by a Board Member who is also responsible for maintaining coordination between them. It is composed of a team that are specialized in various fields varying from spectrum, numbering, research, marketing, customer satisfaction and each one of them relates to one of the four units that form the Authority.

Three sections of administration, finance and audit are directly overseen by the TRA chairman and CEO. The administrative section deals with the implementation of internal organisation and human resources. The finance section is responsible for TRA budgeting issues and guarantees that the budget has been implemented and used appropriately. The audit section is tasked with the auditing of the budget and TRA accounts to be carried out in line with TRA board member decisions

The four units are:

Market and Competition Unit
The Market and competition unit (MCU) is responsible for all economic affairs related to the telecommunications market including its financial and technical aspects. Through conducting economic, financial and technological research, assessments and analyses, the MCU studies the potential of the telecommunications market and guides its development. A large part of its role focuses on suggesting policies and setting conditions for technical services and monitoring compliance with these conditions. In addition, the MCU is responsible for studying tariffs and fees to ensure fair competition.

Telecommunications Technologies Unit
The Telecommunications technologies unit (TTU) deals with all technological matters related to technical resources, telecommunication equipment and supplies. Its duties include radio frequency spectrum and numbering management as well as ensuring the proper technical implementation of interconnection agreements. In addition, it plays a monitoring role regarding quality of service and rights of easement on properties owned by the state and the municipalities. By closely monitoring the latest developments in technology and by setting standards, it ensures the existence of a modern and developed telecommunications market.

Legal Affairs and Licensing Unit
The Legal affairs and licensing unit (LALU) is responsible for monitoring the activities of service providers, managing licensing procedures and updating the legal framework of the telecom sector in line with its needs. In addition, it prepares dispute and complaint documents referred to it by the TRA and mediates between telecommunications service providers, relevant administrations and municipalities concerning the utilization of public properties.

Information and Consumer Affairs Unit
The Information and consumer affairs unit (ICAU) oversees all information matters with the aim of increasing public awareness and protecting consumer interests while promoting transparency. In addition to responding to enquires about the TRA's activities, it is responsible for organizing forums and lectures, disseminating reports and literature, and managing the TRA's websites. In its role as the main link between consumers and the TRA, it prepares consumer statistics, questionnaires, reports and analyses, as well as dealing with complaints concerning disputes between service providers and subscribers.

The departments which are directly affiliated to the TRA chairman and CEO are:

- The department of administrative affairs whose aims are the implementation of the TRA's internal organization, management of human resources and its general administration.
- The department of financial affairs which is responsible for project financing, overseeing its optimal implementation and taking care of accounting issues.
- The department of internal auditing, whose aim is the auditing of the budget and TRA accounts in line with the decisions of the TRA administration.
