= Waddah Sadek =

Lebanese politician

- وضاح صادق
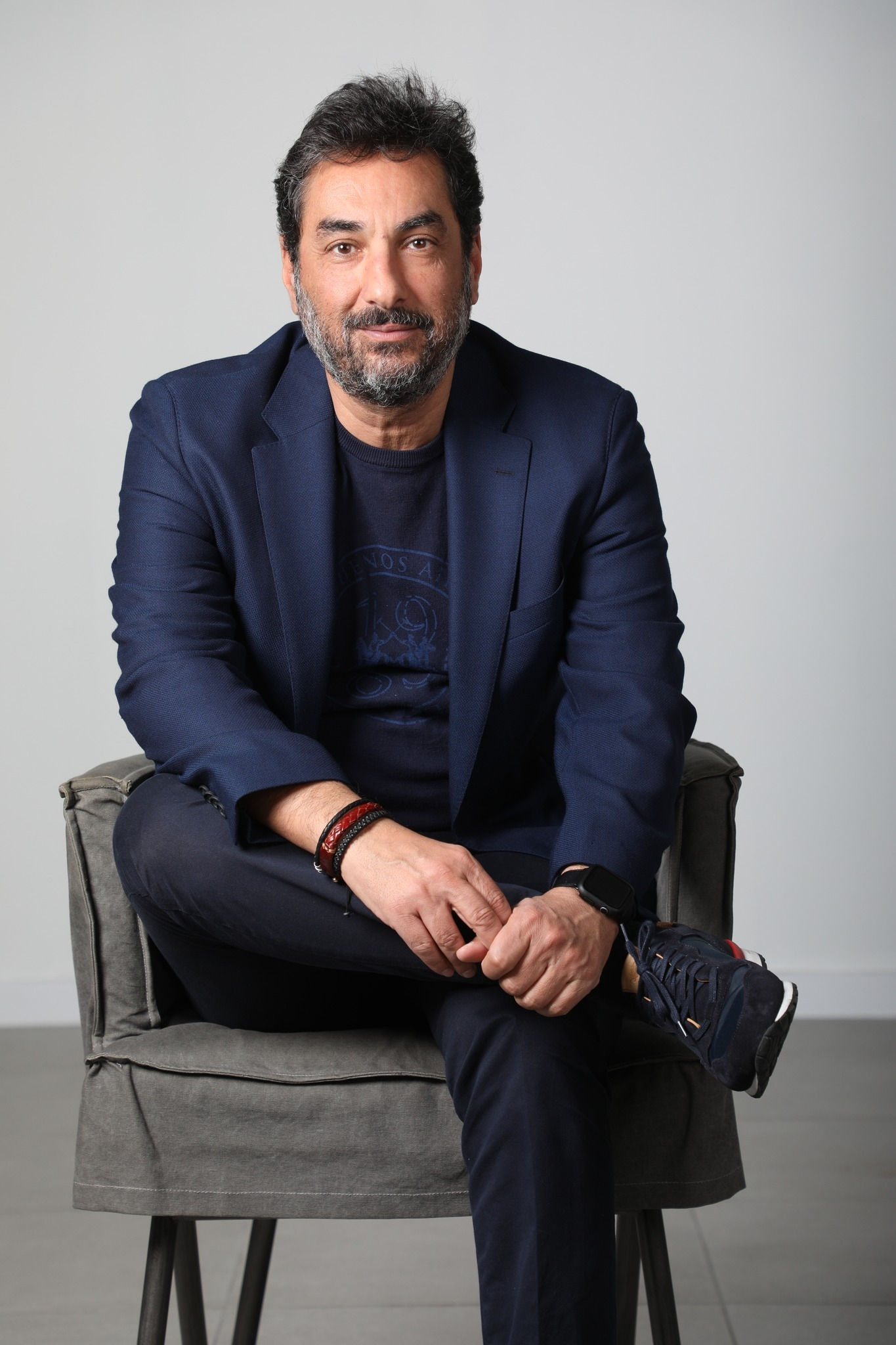

Member of the Lebanese Parliament
- Incumbent
- Assumed office 21 May 2022
- Constituency: Beirut II (2022)

Personal details
- Born: September 28, 1968 (age 57)
- Party: Khatt Ahmar
- Other political affiliations: October 17 revolution
- Occupation: Member of the Lebanese Parliament, political strategist
- Website: http://waddahsadek.com/

Waddah Sadek (Arabic: وضاح صادق; born September 28, 1968, in Damascus, Syria) is a naturalized Lebanese politician and political strategist of Palestinian origin. He was granted the Lebanese citizenship under the Naturalization Decree of 1994, alongside about 100,000 people, and currently serves as a Member of Parliament in the Parliament of Lebanon representing Beirut II. He also sits on the board of directors of its communications.

== Early life and education ==
Waddah Sadek was born on September 28, 1968. In 1989, he enrolled into the Lebanese American University where he studied Business and subsequently graduated with a BSc in Business Administration in 1991.

== Career ==
After his education, Sadek went into TV production and event management. Between 1990 and 1993 he served as the Head of Sports for the Lebanese TV station Al Jadeed. In 1995, he also produced of some of the main sports shows like Kick off on Future TV, Pepsi koura (MBC) and PRO Center on MBC till 2018. Briefly after working with Al Jadeed 2001, he founded Allied Advertising, a communication agency Lebanon, Qatar and KSA. He is also the founder of Proteam Sports & Management, responsible for organizing Arab Sports & Youth Minister's Congress in 2013.

=== Politics ===
Sadek began his career in politics in 2001, first as the Head of Communications to the Prime Minister of Lebanon Rafic Hariri. He was head of communications to Hariri till 2005.

During the October 2019 uprising in Lebanon, he was a voice of activism in Lebanon. He founded “Khatt Ahmar”, a progressive political group that emerged at the time, as well as co-leading on the Lebanese Opposition Front. He has also played a pivotal role in the Lebanese Presidential elections. During the 2022 Lebanese general election, Sadek contested for a seat in the Parliament of Lebanon as an Independent candidate representing Beirut 2 and was elected with 3,760 votes as part of a 13-member reformist October 17 bloc.

However, the newly formed bloc continuously faced disagreements with each other, like voting on the premiership and the presidency, failure to create common grounds with other parliamentary blocs and failing to unite with the parliament opposition. This led to the withdrawal of Waddah Sadek and another MP from the bloc, Michel Doueihy of Osos Lebanon, citing political tensions.
