= Mount Lebanon IV =

Electoral district in Lebanon

- Constituency for the Parliament of Lebanon
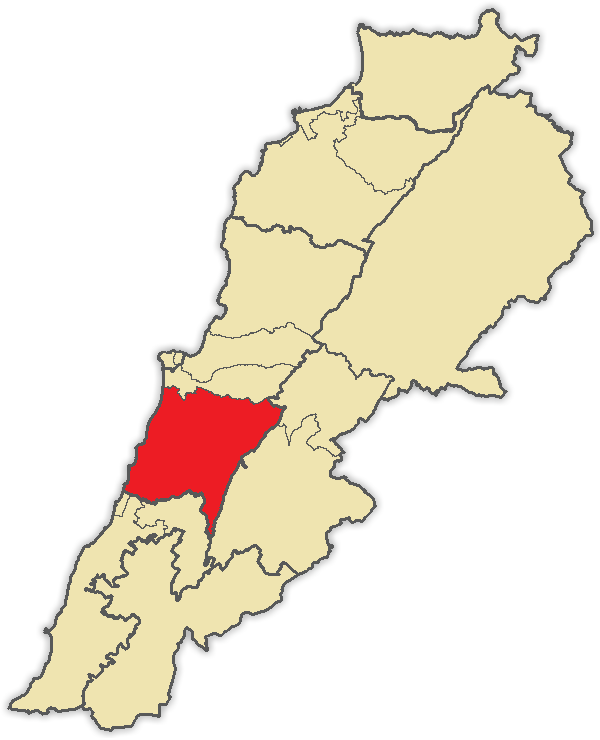
- Governorate: Mount Lebanon
- Electorate: 329,595 (2018)

Current constituency
- Created: 2017
- Number of members: 13 (5 Maronite, 4 Druze, 2 Sunni, 1 Greek Catholic, 1 Greek Orthodox)

Mount Lebanon IV (Arabic: دائرة جبل لبنان الرابعة) is an electoral district in Lebanon, as per the 2017 vote law. The district elects 13 members of the Lebanese National Assembly - 5 Maronites, 4 Druze, 2 Sunni, 1 Greek Catholic and 1 Greek Orthodox. The constituency contains two 'minor districts', Aley (corresponding to Aley District) and Chouf (corresponding to Chouf District). The Aley 'minor district' elects 2 Druze, 2 Maronite and 1 Greek Orthodox parliamentarian, whilst the Chouf 'minor district' elects 3 Maronite, 2 Druze, 2 Sunni and 1 Greek Catholic parliamentarians.

== Electorate ==
40.5% of the electorate is Druze, 27% Maronite, 18.7% Sunni, 5.18% Greek Catholic, 5.14% Greek Orthodox, 2.6% Shia and 0.91% belongs to other Christian communities.

Below data by 'minor district' from 2017;

District	Sunni		Shia		Druze		Alawite		Maronite		Greek Orthodox		Greek Catholic		Armenian Orthodox		Armenian Catholic		Syriac Orthodox		Syriac Catholic		Other Minorities (Note: The Minorities quota includes six different Christian sects Syriac Orthodox, Syriac Catholic, Latin Catholics, Assyrians, Chaldean Catholics and Copts.)		Evangelical		Jews		"Others" (Note: Presumably consisting mainly of individuals whose sectarian affiliation has not been identified and/or individuals not belonging to any of the 18 recognized sects.)		Total
District	No.	%	No.	%	No.	%	No.	%	No.	%	No.	%	No.	%	No.	%	No.	%	No.	%	No.	%	No.	%	No.	%	No.	%	No.	%	No.
Aley	2,602	2.07	4,254	3.38	67,304	53.44	6	0.00	28,685	22.78	14,615	11.61	4,725	3.75	845	0.67	191	0.15	295	0.23	274	0.22	654	0.52	976	0.78	41	0.03	466	0.37	125,933
Chouf	58,223	29.14	5,984	2.99	62,238	31.14	10	0.01	54,401	27.22	3,179	1.59	12,666	6.34	246	0.12	155	0.08	308	0.15	175	0.09	487	0.24	761	0.38	12	0.01	993	0.50	199,838
Source: Lebanon Files

== 2018 election ==
Ahead of the 2018 Lebanese general election 6 lists were registered.

The battle was expected to be mainly between two lists: the "Reconciliation" (Progressive Socialist Party-Future Movement-Lebanese Forces) list and the "Mountain Pledge" (Lebanese Democratic Party-Free Patriotic Movement-Syrian Social Nationalist Party) list. The remaining lists were the "Free Decision" (Kataeb Party and National Liberal Party) list, the "National Unity" list of Wiam Wahhab (former Minister, ex-LDP), the "Civic" list and the "Kulluna Watani" (We are all National) list.

Towards the end of February the Democratic Renewal Movement candidate Antoine Haddad announced his withdrawal from the race.

=== Result by lists ===
List	Votes	% of electoral district	Seats	Members elected	Parties
"Reconciliation"	98,967	58.00	9	Chehayeb, Jumblatt, Hajjar, Adwan, Abdullah, Helou, Nasar, Hamadeh, Tomeh	PSP-Future-LF
"Mountain Pledge"	39,027	22.87	4	Abi Khalil, Arslan, Aoun, Bustani	LDP-FPM-SSNP
"National Unity"	12,796	7.50	0		AUP-Toilers League
"Kulluna Watani"	9,987	5.85	0		Civil society-LCP
"Free Decision"	5,446	3.19	0		Kataeb-NLP
"Civic"	2,916	1.71	0		

=== Result by candidate ===
Name	Sect	List	Party	Votes	% of electoral district	% of preferential votes for sect seat	% of list	Elected?
Akram Chehayeb	Druze (Aley)	"Reconciliation"	PSP	14,088	8.26	54.74	14.24	Yes
Taymour Jumblatt	Druze (Chouf)	"Reconciliation"	PSP	11,478	6.73	39.93	11.60	Yes
Mohammed Hajjar	Sunni (Chouf)	"Reconciliation"	Future	10,003	5.86	35.01	10.11	Yes
Georges Adwan	Maronite (Chouf)	"Reconciliation"	Lebanese Forces	9,956	5.83	29.68	10.06	Yes
Bilal Abdullah	Sunni (Chouf)	"Reconciliation"	PSP	8,492	4.98	29.73	8.58	Yes
Cesar Abi Khalil	Maronite (Aley)	"Mountain Pledge"	FPM	8,124	4.76	38.51	20.82	Yes
Henri Helou	Maronite (Aley)	"Reconciliation"	PSP	7,894	4.63	37.42	7.98	Yes
Talal Arslan	Druze (Aley)	"Mountain Pledge"	LDP	7,887	4.62	30.64	20.21	Yes
Anis Nasar	Greek Orthodox (Aley)	"Reconciliation"	Lebanese Forces	7,872	4.61	54.35	7.95	Yes
Wiam Wahhab	Druze (Chouf)	"National Unity"	Arab Unification Party	7,340	4.30	25.54	57.36	
Marwan Hamadeh	Druze (Chouf)	"Reconciliation"	PSP	7,266	4.26	25.28	7.34	Yes
Nima Tomeh	Greek Catholic (Chouf)	"Reconciliation"	PSP	7,253	4.25	58.21	7.33	Yes
Naji Bustani	Maronite (Chouf)	"Reconciliation"		5,245	3.07	15.64	5.30	
Mario Aoun	Maronite (Chouf)	"Mountain Pledge"	FPM	5,124	3.00	15.28	13.13	Yes
Ghattas Khoury	Maronite (Chouf)	"Reconciliation"	Future	4,998	2.93	14.90	5.05	
Ghassan Atallah	Greek Catholic (Chouf)	"Mountain Pledge"	FPM	4,113	2.41	33.01	10.54	
Ali Al Hajj	Sunni (Chouf)	"Mountain Pledge"		3,374	1.98	11.81	8.65	
Elias Hanna	Greek Orthodox (Aley)	"Mountain Pledge"	FPM	2,760	1.62	19.05	7.07	
Farid Bustani	Maronite (Chouf)	"Mountain Pledge"		2,657	1.56	7.92	6.81	Yes
Tareq Khatib	Sunni (Chouf)	"Mountain Pledge"	FPM	2,382	1.40	8.34	6.10	
Walid Anis Khairallah	Greek Orthodox (Aley)	"National Unity"		2,165	1.27	14.95	16.92	
Raji Saad	Maronite (Aley)	"Reconciliation"	PSP	2,129	1.25	10.09	2.15	
Ghada Maroni Eid	Maronite (Chouf)	"Kulluna Watani"		2,094	1.23	6.24	20.97	
Zoya Jureidini	Greek Orthodox (Aley)	"Kulluna Watani"		1,688	0.99	11.65	16.90	
Mark Daou	Druze (Aley)	"Civic"		1,505	0.88	5.85	51.61	
Teodora Bajani	Maronite (Aley)	"Free Decision"	Kataeb	1,219	0.71	5.78	22.38	
Mohammed Sami Hajjar	Sunni (Chouf)	"Kulluna Watani"		1,133	0.66	3.97	11.34	
Camille Dory Chamoun	Maronite (Chouf)	"Free Decision"	NLP	1,084	0.64	3.23	19.90	
Rania Ghaith	Druze (Chouf)	"Kulluna Watani"		831	0.49	2.89	8.32	
Zaher Khatib	Sunni (Chouf)	"National Unity"	Toilers League	794	0.47	2.78	6.21	
Samir Aoun	Maronite (Chouf)	"Mountain Pledge"	SSNP	770	0.45	2.30	1.97	
Maher Abu Shaqra	Druze (Chouf)	"Kulluna Watani"		760	0.45	2.64	7.61	
Alaa Sabbagh	Druze (Aley)	"Kulluna Watani"		755	0.44	2.93	7.56	
Mazin Shabu	Sunni (Chouf)	"Free Decision"		724	0.42	2.53	13.29	
Rafat Shaaban	Sunni (Chouf)	"Free Decision"		674	0.39	2.36	12.38	
Shafiq Salama Radwan	Druze (Aley)	"National Unity"		660	0.39	2.56	5.16	
Emad Qazi	Druze (Aley)	"Kulluna Watani"		621	0.36	2.41	6.22	
Antoine Fawaz	Greek Catholic (Chouf)	"Kulluna Watani"	LCP	577	0.34	4.63	5.78	
Joseph Eid	Maronite (Chouf)	"Free Decision"	Kataeb	524	0.31	1.56	9.62	
Marwan Halawi	Druze (Chouf)	"Mountain Pledge"	LDP	495	0.29	1.72	1.27	
Imad Hajj	Maronite (Aley)	"Mountain Pledge"		457	0.27	2.17	1.17	
Karl Melham	Maronite (Aley)	"Kulluna Watani"		445	0.26	2.11	4.46	
Souhail Khalil Bajani	Maronite (Aley)	"National Unity"		430	0.25	2.04	3.36	
Maya Terro	Sunni (Chouf)	"Civic"		373	0.22	1.31	12.79	
Ziad Antoine Choueiri	Maronite (Chouf)	"National Unity"		324	0.19	0.97	2.53	
Elias Abdel Salam Baraj	Sunni (Chouf)	"National Unity"		314	0.18	1.10	2.45	
Ghassan Moghbab	Greek Catholic (Chouf)	"Free Decision"		307	0.18	2.46	5.64	
Mazen Nasruddin	Sunni (Chouf)	"Kulluna Watani"		305	0.18	1.07	3.05	
Fadi Khoury	Maronite (Aley)	"Civic"		228	0.13	1.08	7.82	
George Aoun	Maronite (Chouf)	"Kulluna Watani"		190	0.11	0.57	1.90	
Sami Hamada	Druze (Chouf)	"Free Decision"		188	0.11	0.65	3.45	
Chukri Haddad	Greek Catholic (Chouf)	"Civic"		173	0.10	1.39	5.93	
Antoine Bou Melhab	Maronite (Aley)	"Free Decision"	NLP	172	0.10	0.82	3.16	
Da'id Qazi	Maronite (Chouf)	"Free Decision"	NLP	172	0.10	0.51	3.16	
Khaled Aref Khadaj	Druze (Aley)	"National Unity"	Arab Unification Party	153	0.09	0.59	1.20	
Rami Hamadeh	Druze (Chouf)	"Civic"		147	0.09	0.51	5.04	
Marwan Matani	Maronite (Chouf)	"Civic"		134	0.08	0.40	4.60	
Elhan Farahat	Druze (Chouf)	"Free Decision"		132	0.08	0.46	2.42	
As'ad Edmon Abu Jouda	Maronite (Chouf)	"National Unity"		112	0.07	0.33	0.88	
Mazen Abu Dergham	Druze (Chouf)	"Mountain Pledge"	LDP	106	0.06	0.37	0.27	
Elias Gharib	Maronite (Chouf)	"Civic"		105	0.06	0.31	3.60	
Sami Ramah	Druze (Aley)	"Free Decision"		69	0.04	0.27	1.27	
Eliane Qazi	Maronite (Chouf)	"Civic"		56	0.03	0.17	1.92	
Suleiman Rajaili	Greek Catholic (Chouf)	"National Unity"		38	0.02	0.30	0.30	
