= Najat A. Saliba =

Lebanese analytical chemist

- نجاة عون صليبا
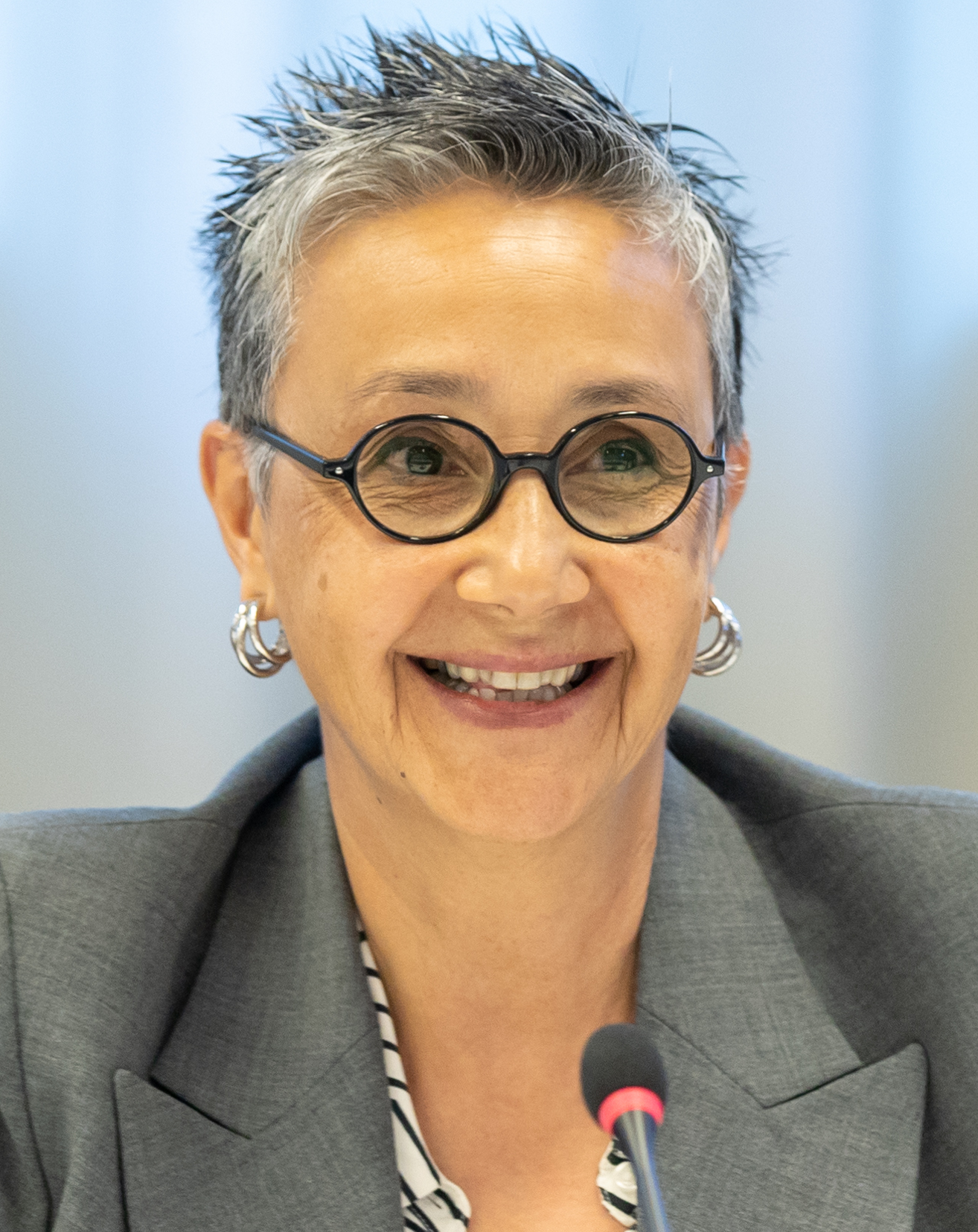
- Najat Saliba, 2023

Member of the Lebanese Parliament
- Incumbent
- Assumed office 17 May 2022
- Preceded by: Mario Aoun
- Constituency: Chouf District

Personal details
- Born: 1966 Damour, Lebanon
- Party: Independent
- Education: Lebanese University (BSc); California State University, Long Beach (MSc); University of Southern California (PhD)
- Occupation: Chemist; Professor; Environmental Advocate; Politician

Academic work
- Discipline: Analytical chemistry; Atmospheric aerosol chemistry
- Institutions: University of California, Irvine; American University of Beirut

Najat Aoun Saliba (Arabic: نجاة عون صليبا; Najat Khattar Aoun) is a Professor of Analytical Chemistry and an atmospheric chemist at the American University of Beirut (AUB). She was the Director of AUB's Nature Conservation Center from 2013 till 2020. Saliba is also the co-founder and director of Khaddit Beirut (an initiative launched after Beirut's 2020 explosion) and the founder and director of the Environment Academy (an initiative created with the support of the World Health Organization). She was appointed a laureate of the L'Oréal-UNESCO For Women in Science program in 2019. In 2022 she was elected to the Lebanese parliament.

== Early life and education ==
Born in 1966, Saliba grew up on a banana farm in Damour, where she was inspired by her father's connection to nature. When the Lebanese Civil War forced her family to move to the city, Saliba became interested in ways to mitigate air pollution. Saliba studied at the Lebanese University, where she earned her bachelor's degree in 1986. She moved to the United States for her graduate studies and earned her master's degree from California State University, Long Beach in 1994. She completed her doctoral studies at the University of Southern California in 1999. She completed a thesis on water pollution and studied catalysis. She was a postdoctoral researcher at the University of California, Irvine.

== Research and career ==
Saliba returned to Lebanon after the Civil War, and joined the American University of Beirut in 2001. She helped to establish the Ibsar Nature Conservation Center for Sustainable Futures in 2002, which looked to protect Lebanon's biodiversity. She used to be the Director of Ibsar, which has since been renamed the Nature Conservation Center, at the American University of Beirut. Saliba established the Atmospheric and Analytical Laboratory. In her early career she struggled to get chemicals, as the majority of Western companies would not ship to Lebanon for fear that they would be used to make weapons.

Her research considers ambient pollutants in Lebanon and the Middle East. Saliba investigates the toxic and carcinogenic chemical constituents of electronic cigarettes and hookahs. She was the first to identify compounds such as formaldehyde in hookahs, and went on to show that electronic cigarettes can generate carbon monoxide. She is part of the Center for the Study of Tobacco Products at Virginia Commonwealth University. Saliba is part of a National Institutes of Health project to investigate the impact of smoking shisha. She was part of a $2.8 million grant to develop computer models to analyse tobacco toxicity. Saliba contributed to the World Health Organization Air Quality Expert Meetings. In one of her works, she compared and analyzed air samples specifically related to forest fires from Beirut and Los Angeles where she draws conclusions about the differences and similarities that those countries share in terms of air pollution.

She established the first Lebanese atmospheric pollutants database. She became concerned about the open-air burning of Lebanese waste; and showed that the incineration could increase the amount of carcinogens in the air by 2,300%. She showed a variety of toxins are emitted during the burning of waste, and measured their concentration at the top of a four-story apartment building in Beirut. She identified particulate matter and polycyclic aromatic hydrocarbons as well as lead, cadmium, titanium and arsenic from metal burning. Saliba contributed to the American University of Beirut Guide to Municipal Solid Waste. She established international protocols for the chemical studies of water pipes. Saliba develops innovative materials and methods to study atmospheric pollutants. In 2018 Saliba's American University of Beirut Nature Conservation Center was selected as one of the top influencing organisations in the regeneration movement by Lush.

Saliba also studied the effects of the Beirut Port Explosion on the atmospheric pollutants in the city of Beirut. She also warned against potential hazardous chemicals and pollutants that were dispersed and called on the people of Beirut to take necessary precautions.

Saliba is an editor of PeerJ.

She was featured in Nature in 2022 in the "Where I Work" session, describing her work connecting researchers and the local community.

== In politics ==
Najat Saliba became involved politically after the 2020 Beirut Port Explosion. She ran in the 2022 Lebanese general election as a new face against the 50-year ruling political class. She won a seat in the parliament representing the Maronite sect of the Chouf district.

On 18 March 2026, Saliba called on Hezbollah to hand over its weapons to the Lebanese government to strengthen the state, arguing that this move was supported by most Lebanese.

== Awards and honours ==
- 2016 Lebanese National Council for Scientific Research Award
- 2018 American Physiological Society Prize for Interdisciplinary Research
- 2019 L'Oréal-UNESCO For Women in Science Award
- 2019 National Order of the Cedar
- 2019 100 Women (BBC)
