= 2018 Lebanese general election in Bekaa I =

- 6 May 2018
- 7 seats in the Lebanese parliament for the Bekaa I constituency 4 seats needed for a majority
- Turnout: 53.57%
| Party | Leader | Vote % | Seats | +/– |
|---|---|---|---|---|
| Lebanese Forces | Samir Geagea | 16.28 | 2 | |
| Hezbollah | Hassan Nasrallah | 17.02 | 1 | |
| Future Movement | Saad Hariri | 12.19 | 1 | |
| Free Patriotic Movement | Gebran Bassil | 6.07 | 1 | |
| Popular Bloc | Myriam Skaff | 11.87 | 0 | |
This lists parties that won seats. See the complete results below.
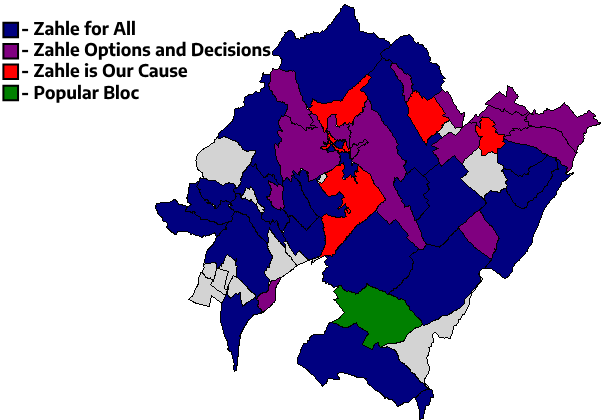
Result of each list per municipality, Zahle District

Voting to elect seven members of the Lebanese parliament took place in the Bekaa I district (one of three electoral districts in Bekaa region) on 6 May 2018, part of the general election of that year. The constituency had 172,555 voters, out of whom 94,082 voted. The district elects 2 Greek Catholic parliamentarians, 1 Maronite, 1 Greek Orthodox, 1 Armenian Orthodox, 1 Shia and 1 Sunni.

== Background ==
Local politics in Zahle has for long been dominated by the Skaff clan, ever since the French Mandate administration chose to benefit the family in order to counter the influence of other local elites. But the election of Zahle politician Elias Hrawi as President of Lebanon challenged the position of the Skaff bloc leader Elias J. Skaff. In the 1990s pro-Syrian forces opted to rally behind the city mayor and lawyer Nicolas Fattouch, creating an alternative bloc of political power. During the elections of 1992, 1996 and 2000 the influence of the Skaff family gradually declined.

== Demographics ==
The electorate in the first Bekaa electoral district is predominately Christian. Ahead of the 2018 elections, electoral district had 172,555 registered voters; 48,867 Sunni (28.32%), 27,538 Shia (15.96%), 906 Druze (0.53%), 32,295 Greek Catholic (18.72%), 27,049 Maronite (15.68%), 16,470 Greek Orthodox (9.54%), 8,604 Armenian Orthodox (4.99%), 6,646 Syriac Orthodox and Syriac Catholic (3.85%), 1,846 Armenian Catholic (1.07%), 1,349 Evangelical (0.78%) and 985 from other sects (0.57%).

== Vote ==
5 lists were registered in the electoral district for the 2018 Lebanese general election. An alliance of Free Patriotic Movement, Future Movement, Tashnaq and independents was announced with the candidature name "Zahle for All". Lebanese Forces and the Kataeb Party fielded the "Zahle is Our Cause" list. There were also the "Popular Bloc" list led by Myriam Skaff, "Zahle Options and Decisions" led by Nicolas Fattouch (including a Hezbollah candidate) and the civil society list "We are All National". Ashraf Rifi did not field a list in Zahle, as he failed to reach an alliance with Kataeb and Lebanese Forces on the matter. Commenting on the pre-electoral alliance-building in Zahle, an Al-Jazeera journalist noted "[b]izarre alliances competing for one eastern city's seven seats reflect maneuvering for votes in parliamentary elections".

=== Candidates ===
Bold indicates incumbent parliamentarian, green winning candidate

| List | Votes | % | Seats | Greek Catholic, 2 seats | | Maronite, 1 seat | Greek Orthodox, 1 seat | Sunni, 1 seat | Shia, 1 seat | Armenian Orthodox, 1 seat |
|---|---|---|---|---|---|---|---|---|---|---|
| "Zahle for All" | 36,391 | 39.70 | 3 | Michel George Daher; 9,742 (10.63%) | Michel Skaff 987 (1.08%) | Salim Aoun (FPM); 5,567 (6.07%) | Assaad Nakad 4,138 (4.51%) | **Asim Araji** (Future); 7,224 (7.88%) | Nizar Dalloul (Future) 3,947 (4.31%) | Marie-Jeanne Bilezikjian 3,851 (4.20%) |
| "Zahle Options and Decisions" | 23,546 | 25.69 | 2 | **Nicolas Fattouch** 5,737 (6.26%) | | Khalil Hrawi 343 (0.37%) | Nassif Al-Tini (SSNP) 528 (0.58%) | Wajih Araji 592 (0.65%) | Anwar Jomaa (Hezbollah); 15,601 (17.02%) | Eddie Demirjian; 77 (0.08%) |
| "Zahle is Our Cause" | 18,702 | 20.40 | 2 | George Akeis (Lebanese Forces); 11,363 (12.40%) | Michel Fattouch 552 (0.60%) | **Elie Maroni** (Kataeb) 1,213 (1.32%) | César Maalouf; 3,554 (3.88%) | Muhammad Ali Mita 1,370 (1.49%) | Amer Sabouri 111 (0.12%) | Boughous Kordian 142 (0.15%) |
| "Popular Bloc" | 10,885 | 11.87 | 0 | Mariam Skaff 6,348 (6.92%) | Nicola Amorri 95 (0.10%) | Paul Charbel 824 (0.90%) | Nicola Saba 271 (0.30%) | Ahmed Ajoumi 1,008 (1.10%) | Osama Salhab 172 (0.19%) | George Bushikian 1,845 (2.01%) |
| "We are All National" | 1,599 | 1.74 | 0 | Ghassan Maalouf 651 (0.71%) | | Hanna Habib 287 (0.31%) | Vanda Chedid (Green) 268 (0.29%) | Houd Taaïmi 201 (0.22%) | Mohammad Hassan 71 (0.08%) | |
Source: Al-Liwaa, ACE Project, Ministry of Interior and Municipalities
