= Skaff =

Skaff or Scaff may refer to:

== Skaff ==
- Skaff Bloc, Lebanese parliamentary bloc led by Myriam Skaff
- Skaff Elias, American game designer
- Doug Skaff (1976–2025), American politician from West Virginia
- Elias Skaff (1948–2015), Lebanese politician and Member of Parliament
- Joseph Skaff (1922–1991), Lebanese politician and Member of Parliament
- Frank Skaff (1910–1988), baseball infielder, coach, manager and scout in American Major League Baseball
- Joseph J. Skaff (born 1930), major general in the United States Army
- Kevin Skaff, member of American rock band A Day to Remember from Florida
- Ghassan Skaff Lebanese politician and Member of Parliament, Neurosurgeon

== Scaff ==
- Estádio Jacy Scaff, usually known as Estádio do Café, a football stadium in Londrina, Paraná, Brazil
- Jorge Saade-Scaff, or Jorge Saade, Ecuadorian violinist
- Julian H. Scaff, American artist, filmmaker, and designer

== See also ==
- Skaf (disambiguation)
