= Skaf =

Skaf or SKAF may refer to:

== People ==
- May Skaf (1969–2018), Syrian actress and activist
- Paulo Skaf (born 1955), Brazilian entrepreneur and politician

== Other uses ==
- SKAF (automobile), a prototype automobile built between 1923 and 1924 in Poland
- SKAF Khemis Miliana, Algerian football club
- Republic of Korea Air Force, also known as South Korean Air Force (SKAF)

== See also ==
- Skaff (disambiguation)
