= ADO 55 =

Taxation of fortunes case of the Supreme Court of Brazil

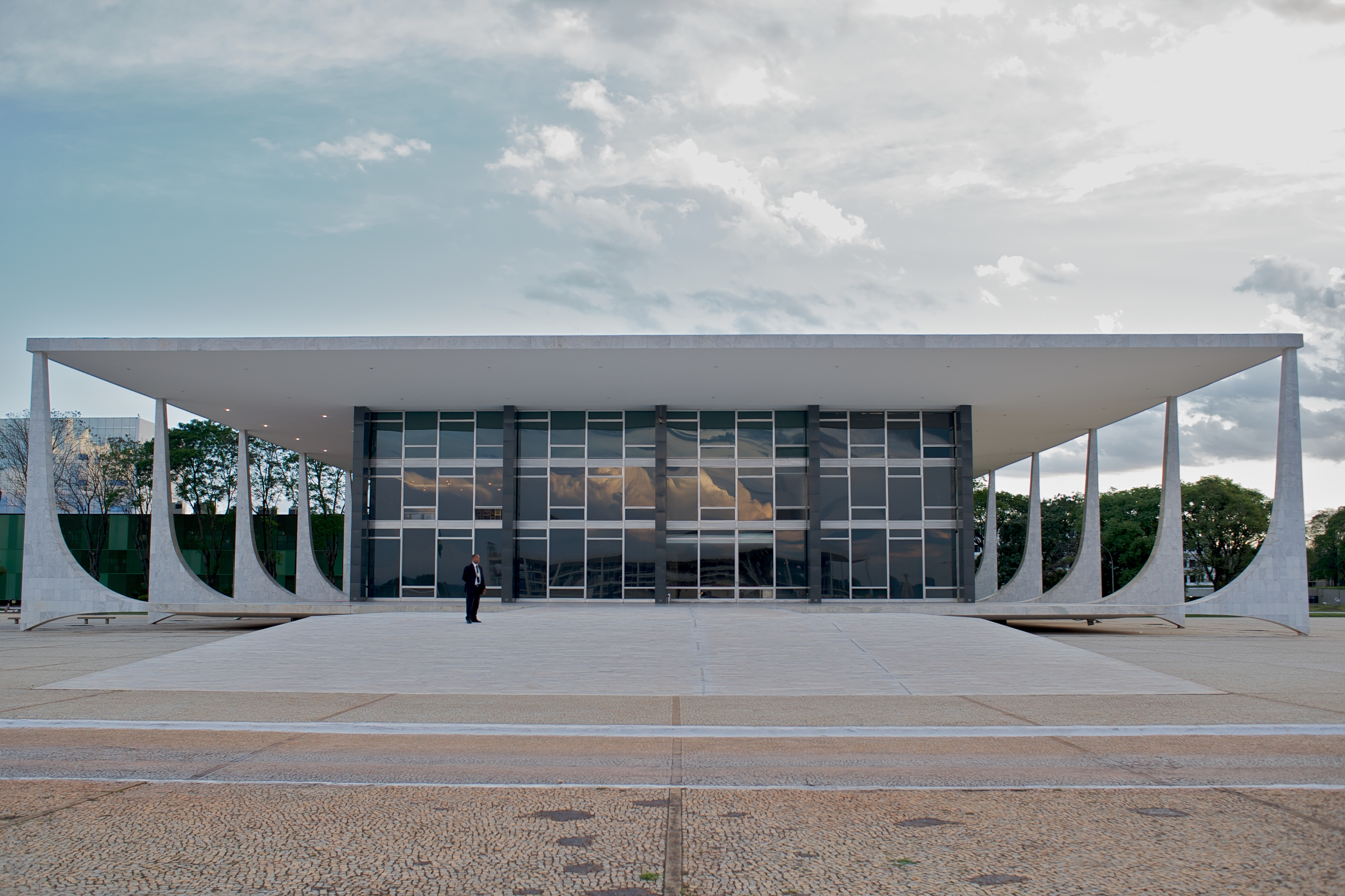
- Court: Supreme Federal Court
- Full case name: Ação Direta de Inconstitucionalidade por Omissão 55 (Socialism and Liberty Party (PSOL) v. Brazilian National Congress)
- Started: 2 October 2019
- Decided: 6 November 2025

Court membership
- Judges sitting: President: Edson Fachin; Justices: Marco Aurélio; Flávio Dino; Luiz Fux; Cármen Lúcia; Nunes Marques; Gilmar Mendes; Alexandre de Moraes; Dias Toffoli; Cristiano Zanin

Case opinions
- Decision by: Aurélio
- Concurrence: Dino, Lúcia, Marques, de Moraes, Toffoli, Zanin
- Dissent: Fux

Keywords
- Economic inequality; Wealth tax

ADO 55 (Note: The full case name is Ação Direta de Inconstitucionalidade por Omissão 55, which translates to Direct Action of Unconstituionality by Omission 55) was a case of the Supreme Court of Brazil concerning the taxation of great fortunes. (Note: Imposto sobre Grandes Fortunas (IGF), lit. 'Tax on Large Fortunes') The Socialism and Liberty Party (PSOL) argued that there had been an unconstitutional omission on the part of Congress in not legislating the taxation of great fortunes and, on 6 November 2025, the court reached a concurring decision.

== Background ==
PSOL's case points to a clause in the Constitution of Brazil, promulgated in 1988, which states the following:

Art. 153. Compete à União instituir impostos sobre: (...) VII - grandes fortunas, nos termos de lei complementar.
Art. 153. Belongs to the Union the power to establish taxes on: (...) VII - great fortunes, in the terms of supplementary law.

—"Constituição da República Federativa do Brasil de 1988" [1988 Constitution of the Federative Republic of Brazil] (in Brazilian Portuguese). 5 October 1988. Seção III: dos Impostos da União.

PSOL argues that, in order to move in the direction of the societal goals outlined in another section of the Constitution – to build a free and just society (Art. 3rd, I) and to eradicate poverty, marginalization and to reduce social and regional inequalities (Art 3rd, III) – Congress should have already voted on one such supplementary law. It continues stating that, since over 30 years had passed since the Constitution was promulgated, there had been enough time to establish a taxation of great fortunes. As such, the party concludes, this had been an unconstitutional omission on the part of Congress.

Both the Advocacy General of the Union and the Prosecutor General of the Republic were against the case, claiming the constitutional provision is not mandatory, and the creation of such a tax would incur in investors fleeing the country.

== Votes ==
In 2021, during a virtual session, minister Marco Aurélio gave his decision as rapporteur, accepting the case and deciding Congress was unconstitutionally remiss, and has the obligation to vote on the taxation. However, Aurélio did not decide on any provisional parameters – leaving that discussion to Congress – nor did he define a timeframe for this vote to take place.

Following Aurélio's decision, minister Gilmar Mendes requested the session be resumed in-person, which suspended voting. Aurélio went on to retire in July 2021, being succeeded by minister André Mendonça by December; Mendonça, however, could not recast a vote in this case.

Voting resumed and was concluded in 2025, when ministers Cristiano Zanin, Nunes Marques, Dias Toffoli, Alexandre de Moraes and Cármen Lúcia concurred with the rapporteur, agreeing there had been omission but not imposing any time limit for Congress to legislate.

Minister Flávio Dino concurred but partially diverged, proposing a 24-month limit for Congress to vote on the topic. Dino argued the omission is "unbearable", and pointed out Brazil has one of the lowest rates of inheritance tax in the world. Dino further argued that if Congress were to decide there should be no tax on great fortunes, then the clause should be revoked from the Constitution; as it stands, the status quo is unconstitutional.

Minister Luiz Fux was the sole dissenter, arguing the Court must respect Congress' political option of not voting on the matter. Fux further criticized the decision of his peers of accepting the case, but not imposing a time limit for Congress to act: "recognizing an omission, so what? What's the practical result of this judicial decision?"

Ministers Edson Fachin and Gilmar Mendes were absent from the voting session, in part due to the COP30 event.

== High Court decision ==
=== Judiciary representation ===
Supreme Court members	Ministers	Yes	No
Marco Aurélio	1	1	
Flávio Dino	1	1	
Luiz Fux	1		1
Cármen Lúcia	1	1	
Nunes Marques	1	1	
Alexandre de Moraes	1	1	
Dias Toffoli	1	1	
Cristiano Zanin	1	1	
Total	08	07	01

== See also ==
- Income inequality in Brazil
