= Bekaa I =

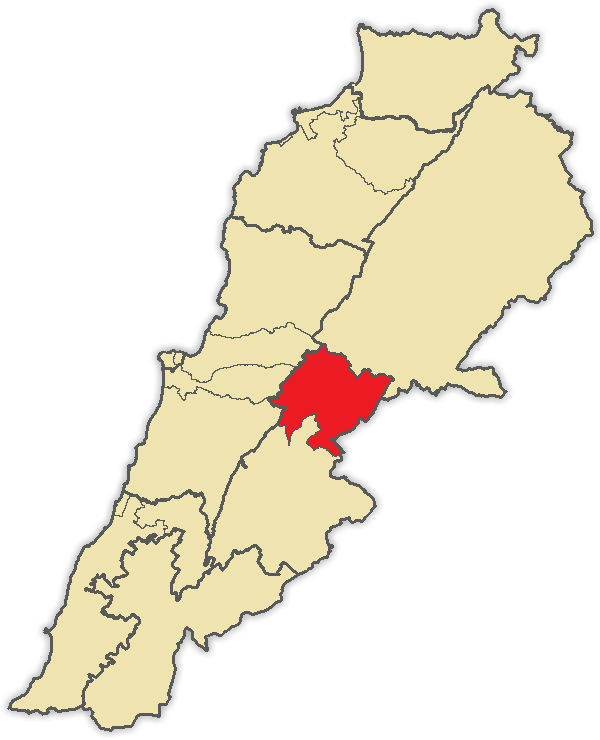
Bekaa I electoral district, covering the Zahle District

Bekaa I (Arabic: دائرة البقاع الاولى) is an electoral district in Lebanon, as per the 2017 vote law. The district elects 2 Greek Catholic parliamentarians, 1 Maronite, 1 Greek Orthodox, 1 Armenian Orthodox, 1 Shia and 1 Sunni. The electoral district covers the qada of Zahle. The electoral district retained the geographic boundaries and seat allocation of the Zahle electoral district from the previous electoral law.

== Electorate ==
The electorate in the first Bekaa electoral district is predominately Christian. Ahead of the 2018 elections, electoral district had 172,555 registered voters; 48,867 Sunni (28.32%), 27,538 Shia (15.96%), 906 Druze (0.53%), 32,295 Greek Catholic (18.72%), 27,049 Maronite (15.68%), 16,470 Greek Orthodox (9.54%), 8,604 Armenian Orthodox (4.99%), 6,646 Syriac Orthodox and Syriac Catholic (3.85%), 1,846 Armenian Catholic (1.07%), 1,349 Evangelical (0.78%) and 985 from other sects (0.57%).

== Political dynamics ==
Local politics in Zahle was for long been dominated by the Skaff clan, ever since the French Mandate administration chose to benefit the family in order to counter the influence of other local elites. But the election of Zahle politician Elias Hrawi as President of Lebanon challenged the position of the Skaff bloc leader Elias J. Skaff. In the 1990s pro-Syrian forces opted to rally behind the city mayor and lawyer Nicolas Fattouch, creating an alternative bloc of political power. During the elections of 1992, 1996 and 2000 the influence of the Skaff family gradually declined.

== 2009 election ==
Ahead of the 2009 Lebanese general election the Zahle electoral district had 158,005 registered voters. The voter turnout stood at 91,848 (58.12%), above the national average of 50.7%. Two main lists crystalized; a joint list of Fattouch, the Future Movement, the Lebanese Forces and the Kataeb Party, and the Skaff-aligned Popular Bloc list supported by Hezbollah and the Free Patriotic Movement. The Fattouch-led list won, receiving an average 48,688 votes for their candidates, while the Skaff-led list finished in second place with an average vote for its candidates at 41,380. The elected MPs from the Fattouch list were Elie Maroni of the Kataeb Party (Maronite, 49,328 votes), Okab Sakr (Shia, 49,238 votes), Shant Janjanian (Armenian Orthodox, 48,527 votes), Asim Araji (Sunni, 48,524 votes), Joseph Maalouf (Greek Orthodox, 48,288 votes), Tony Abou Khater (Greek Catholic, 47,999 votes) and Nicolas Fattouch (Greek Catholic, 47,709 votes). The most voted candidate on the other list was Elias J. Skaff, with 42,975 votes.

== 2018 election ==
5 lists were registered in the electoral district for the 2018 Lebanese general election. An alliance of Free Patriotic Movement, Future Movement, Tashnaq and independents was announced with the candidature name "Zahle for All". Lebanese Forces and the Kataeb Party fielded the "Zahle is Our Cause" list. There were also the "Popular Bloc" list led by Myriam Skaff, "Zahle Options and Decisions" led by Nicolas Fattouch (including a Hezbollah candidate) and the civil society list "We are All National". Ashraf Rifi did not field a list in Zahle, as he failed to reach an alliance with Kataeb and Lebanese Forces on the matter. Commenting on the pre-electoral alliance-building in Zahle, an Al-Jazeera journalist noted "[b]izarre alliances competing for one eastern city's seven seats reflect maneuvering for votes in parliamentary elections".

Bold indicated incumbent parliamentarian, green winning candidate

List	Votes	%	Seats	Greek Catholic, 2 seats		Maronite, 1 seat	Greek Orthodox, 1 seat	Sunni, 1 seat	Shia, 1 seat	Armenian Orthodox, 1 seat
"Zahle for All"	36,391	39.70	3	Michel George Daher; 9,742 (10.63%)	Michel Skaff; 987 (1.08%)	Salim Aoun (FPM); 5,567 (6.07%)	Assaad Nakad; 4,138 (4.51%)	**Asim Araji** (Future); 7,224 (7.88%)	Nizar Dalloul (Future); 3,947 (4.31%)	Marie-Jeanne Bilezikjian; 3,851 (4.20%)
"Zahle Options and Decisions"	23,546	25.69	2	**Nicolas Fattouch**; 5,737 (6.26%)		Khalil Hrawi; 343 (0.37%)	Nassif Al-Tini (SSNP); 528 (0.58%)	Wajih Araji; 592 (0.65%)	Anwar Jomaa (Hezbollah); 15,601 (17.02%)	Eddie Demirjian; 77 (0.08%)
"Zahle is Our Cause"	18,702	20.40	2	George Akeis (Lebanese Forces); 11,363 (12.40%)	Michel Fattouch; 552 (0.60%)	**Elie Maroni** (Kataeb); 1,213 (1.32%)	César Maalouf; 3,554 (3.88%)	Muhammad Ali Mita; 1,370 (1.49%)	Amer Sabouri; 111 (0.12%)	Boughous Kordian; 142 (0.15%)
"Popular Bloc"	10,885	11.87	0	Mariam Skaff; 6,348 (6.92%)	Nicola Amorri; 95 (0.10%)	Paul Charbel; 824 (0.90%)	Nicola Saba; 271 (0.30%)	Ahmed Ajoumi; 1,008 (1.10%)	Osama Salhab; 172 (0.19%)	George Bushikian; 1,845 (2.01%)
"We are All National"	1,599	1.74	0	Ghassan Maalouf; 651 (0.71%)		Hanna Habib; 287 (0.31%)	Vanda Chedid (Green); 268 (0.29%)	Houd Taaïmi; 201 (0.22%)	Mohammad Hassan; 71 (0.08%)	
Source: Al-Liwaa, ACE Project, Ministry of Interior and Municipalities
