= 2014 São Paulo gubernatorial election =

Brazilian gubernatorial election

2014 São Paulo state election
- October 5, 2014
- Opinion polls
- Gubernatorial election
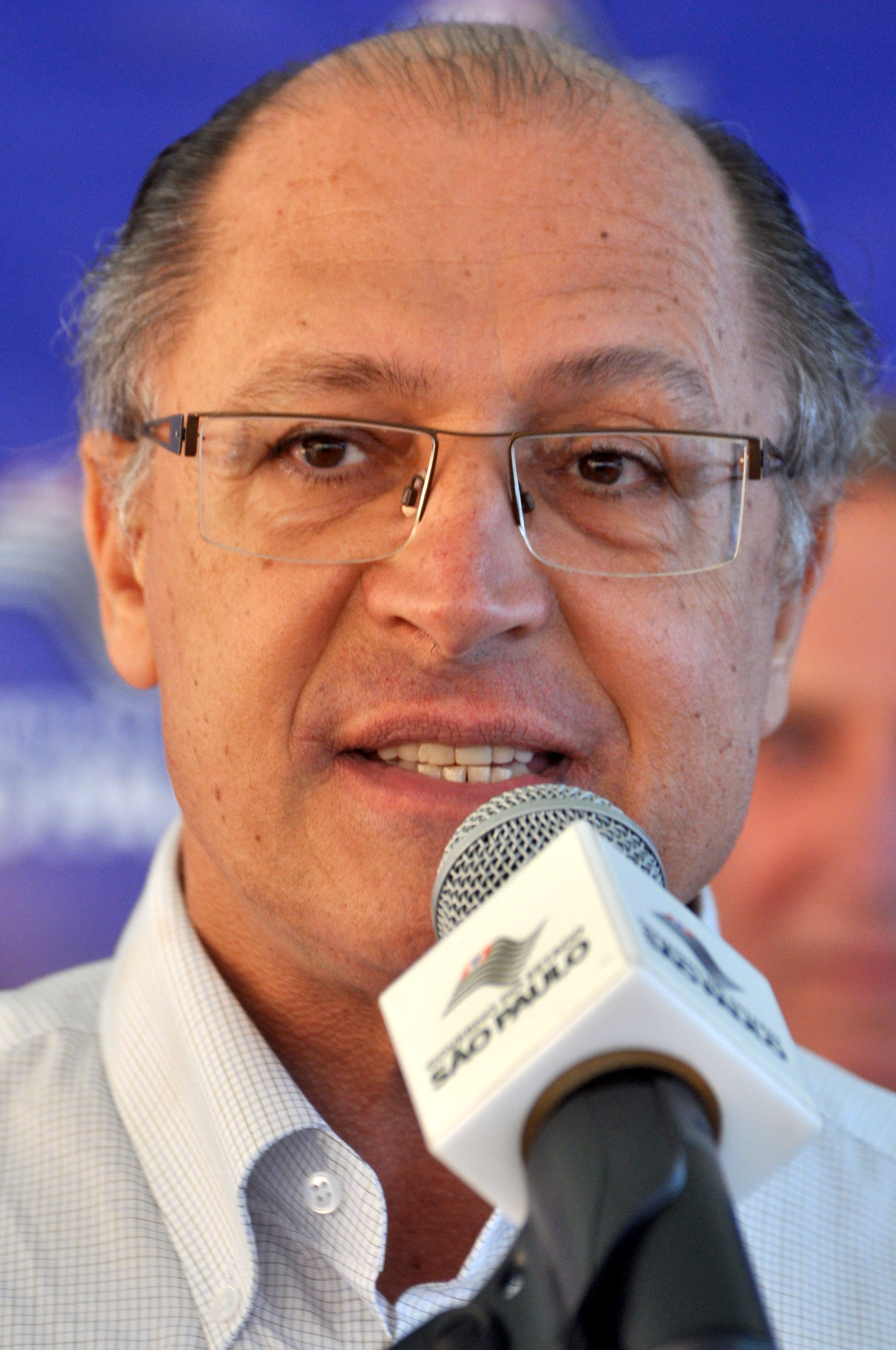

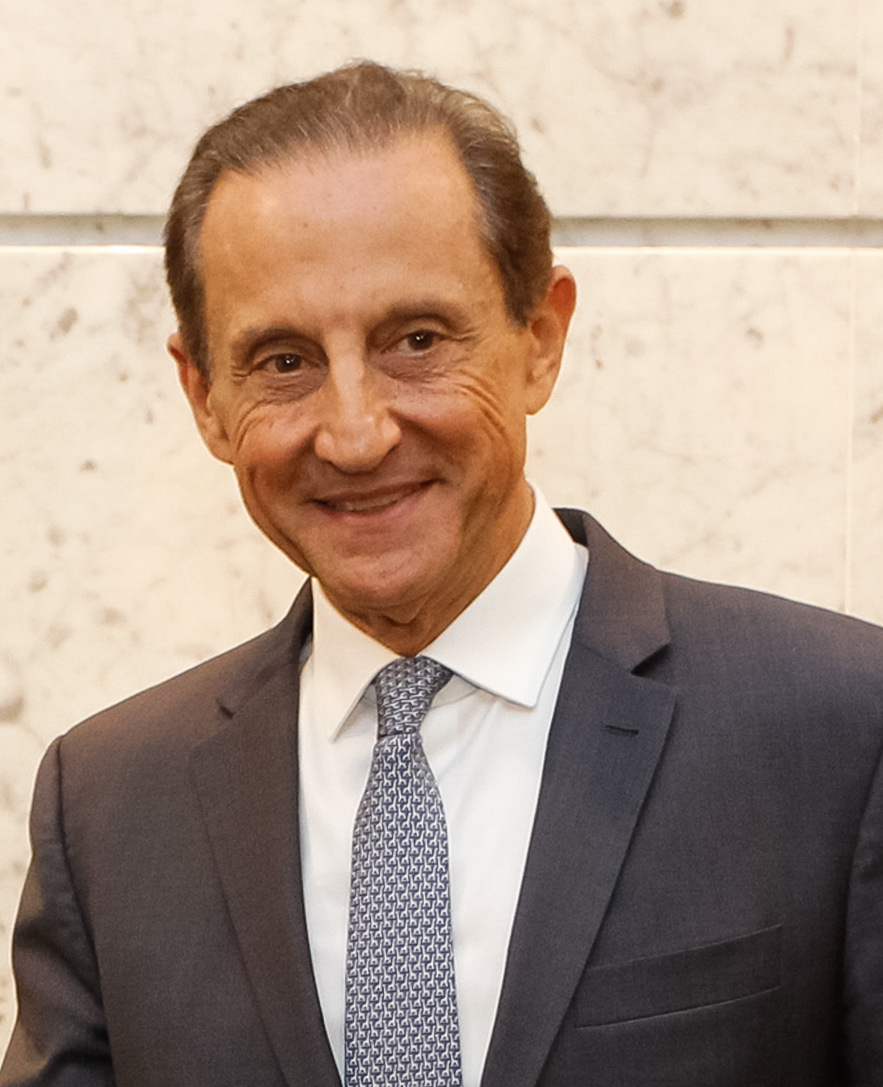

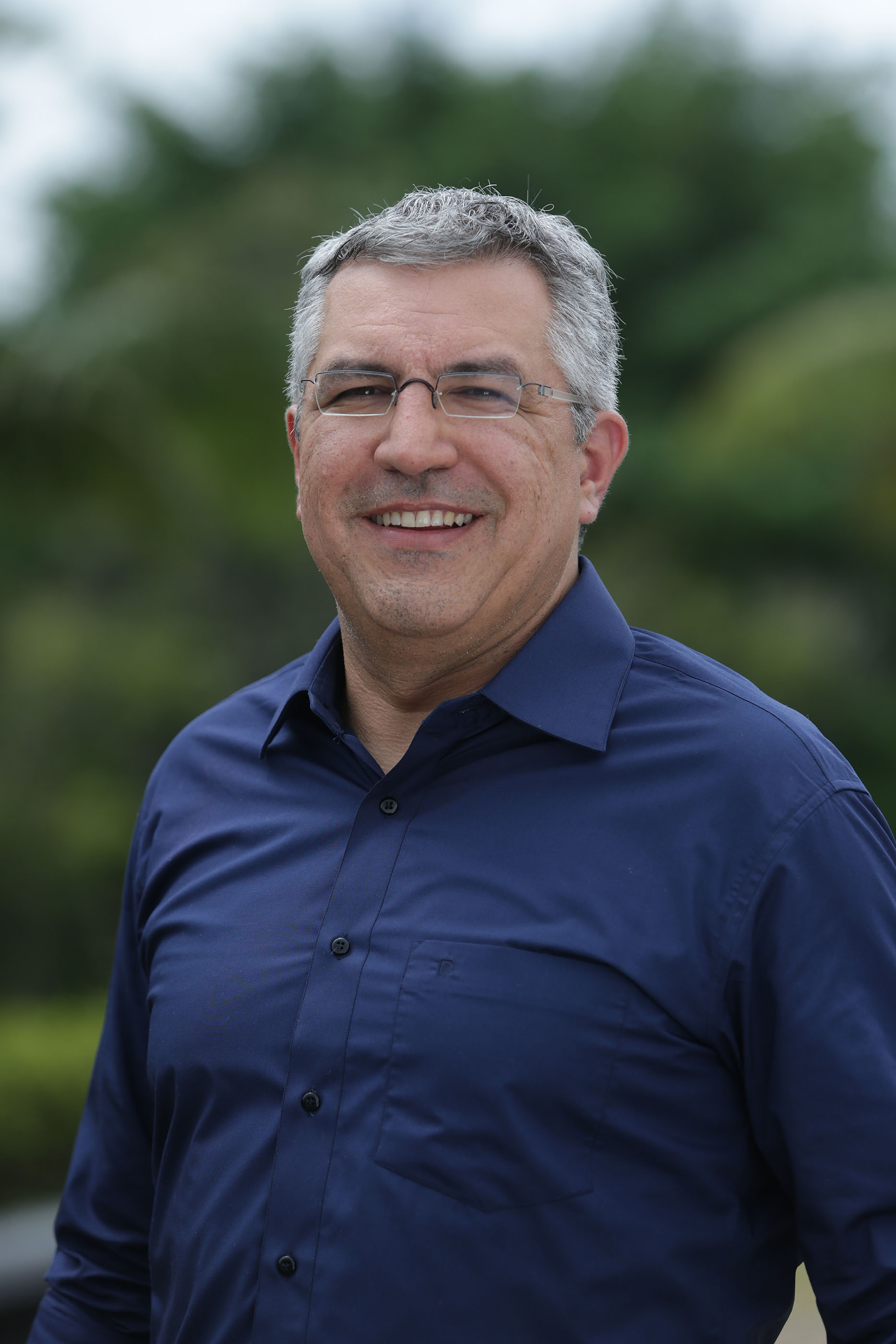
Nominee	Geraldo Alckmin	Paulo Skaf	Alexandre Padilha
Party	PSDB	MDB	PT
Alliance	This is São Paulo	São Paulo Wants the Best	To Truly Change
Running mate	Márcio França	José Roberto Batochio	Nivaldo Santana
Popular vote	12,230,807	4,594,708	3,888,584
Percentage	57.31%	21.53%	18.22%
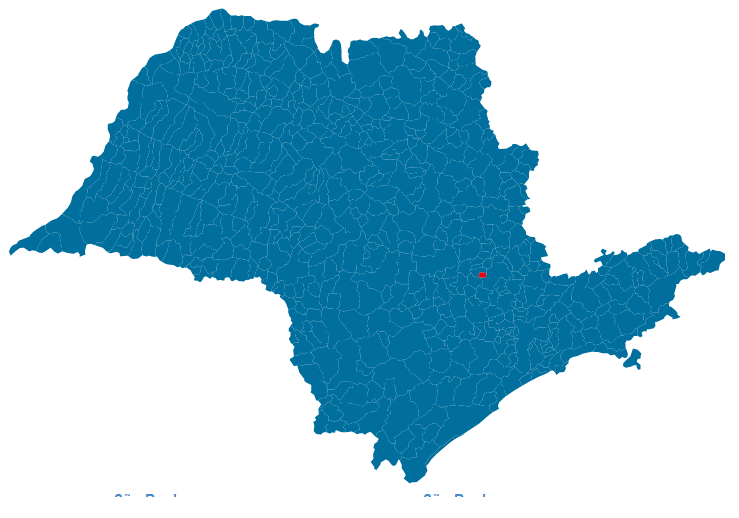
- Geraldo Alckmin Paulo Skaf Alexandre Padilha
Governor before election
Geraldo Alckmin
PSDB
Elected Governor
Geraldo Alckmin
PSDB
- Parliamentary election
Party	Leader	Vote %	Seats	+/–
Legislative Assembly
PT	João Paulo Rillo	14.51%	14	−10
PV	Beto Trícoli	6.22%	6	−3
PSB	Carlos Cezar	5.74%	5	+2
MDB	Jorge Caruso	4.88%	4	−1
PSC	Rodrigo Moraes	3.03%	3	−1
PR	André do Prado	3.00%	3	+2
PTB	Campos Machado	2.96%	3	−1
Republicanos	Gilmaci Santos	2.83%	4	+2
PPS	Alex Manente	2.73%	3	−1
PSOL	Carlos Giannazi	2.37%	2	+1
This lists parties that won seats. See the complete results below.

2014 Brazilian senate election
- October 5, 2014
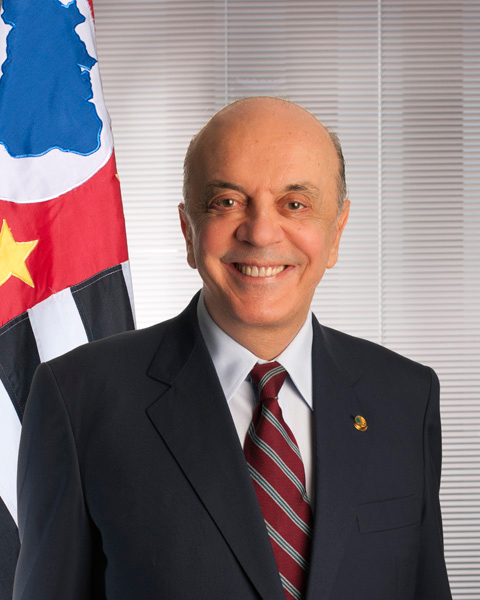

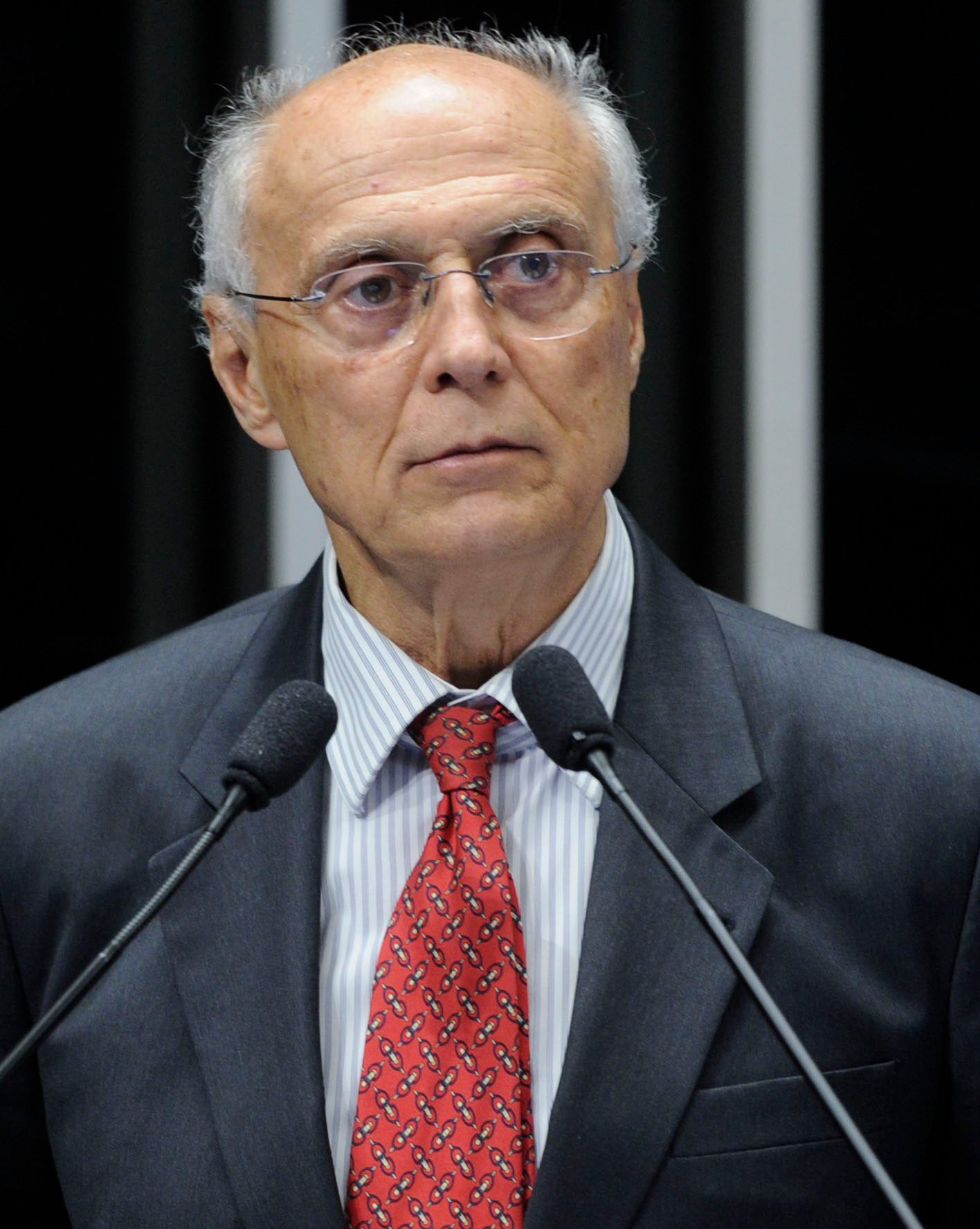

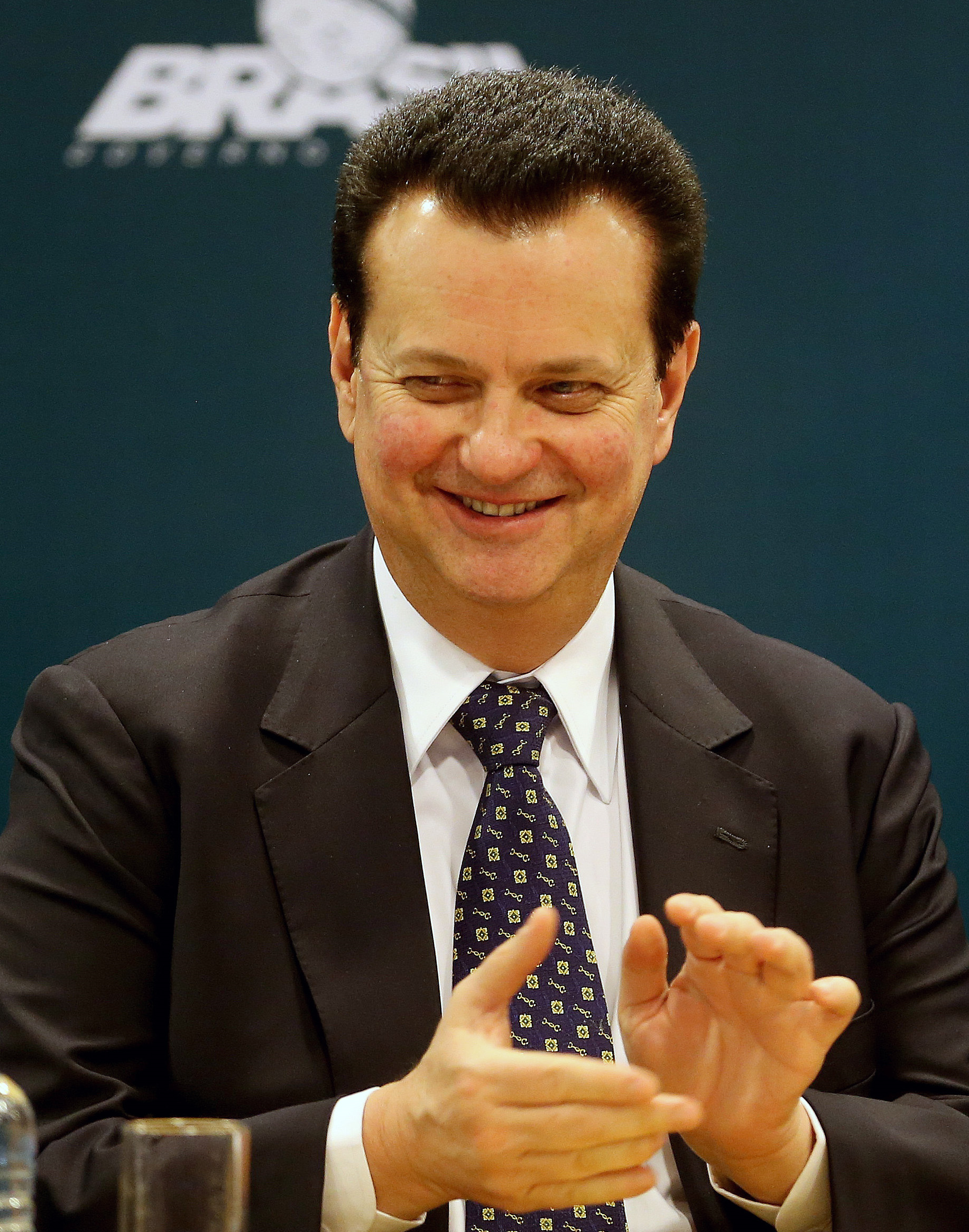
Nominee	José Serra	Eduardo Suplicy	Gilberto Kassab
Party	PSDB	PT	PSD
Popular vote	11,105,874	6,176,499	1,128,582
Percentage	58.49%	32.53%	5.94%
Senator before election
Eduardo Suplicy
PT
Elected Senator
José Serra
PSDB

The São Paulo gubernatorial election was held on 5 October 2014 to elect the next governor of the state of São Paulo. If no candidate had received more than 50% of the vote, a second-round runoff election would have been held on 26 October. Incumbent Governor Geraldo Alckmin won re-election in the first round.

== Candidates ==
=== Governor ===
Party	Candidate	Most relevant political office or occupation	Party	Running mate	Coalition	Electoral number
Workers' Party (PT)	Alexandre Padilha	Minister of Health of Brazil (2011–2014)	Communist Party of Brazil (PCdoB)	Nivaldo Santana	To Truly Change: Workers' Party (PT); Communist Party of Brazil (PCdoB); Party of the Republic (PR); Free Fatherland Party (PPL)	13
Brazilian Democratic Movement Party (PMDB)	Paulo Skaf	President of FIESP (2004–2021)	Democratic Labour Party (PDT)	José Roberto Batochio	São Paulo Wants the Best: Brazilian Democratic Movement Party (PMDB); Democratic Labour Party (PDT); Social Democratic Party (PSD); Progressive Party (PP); Republican Party of the Social Order (PROS)	15
Brazilian Communist Party (PCB)	Wagner Freitas	Nursing technician	Brazilian Communist Party (PCB)	Ivan Hermine	—N/a	21
Brazilian Labour Renewal Party (PRTB)	Walter Ciglioni	Journalist and redactor	Brazilian Labour Renewal Party (PRTB)	Marcelo Duarte	—N/a	28
Workers' Cause Party (PCO)	Raimundo Sena	Civil construction worker	Workers' Cause Party (PCO)	Ulisses Coelho	—N/a	29
Humanist Party of Solidarity (PHS)	Laercio Benko	Member of the Municipal Chamber of São Paulo (2015–2017)	Humanist Party of Solidarity (PHS)	Sérgio Contente	United for São Paulo: Humanist Party of Solidarity (PHS); Progressive Republican Party (PRP)	31
Green Party (PV)	Gilberto Natalini	Member of the Municipal Chamber of São Paulo (2001–2021)	Green Party (PV)	Maria Lúcia Haidar	—N/a	43
Brazilian Social Democracy Party (PSDB)	Geraldo Alckmin	Governor of São Paulo (2011–2018)	Brazilian Socialist Party (PSB)	Márcio França	This is São Paulo: Brazilian Social Democracy Party (PSDB); Brazilian Socialist Party (PSB); Democrats (DEM); Brazilian Republican Party (PRB); Solidariedade (SD); Social Christian Party (PSC); Popular Socialist Party (PPS); Christian Labour Party (PTC); National Labour Party (PTN); Social Liberal Party (PSL); Party of National Mobilization (PMN); National Ecologic Party (PEN); Christian Social Democratic Party (PSDC); Labour Party of Brazil (PTdoB)	45
Socialism and Liberty Party (PSOL)	Gilberto Maringoni	Professor and cartoonist	Socialism and Liberty Party (PSOL)	Hildete Nepomuceno	Left-Wing Front: Socialism and Liberty Party (PSOL); United Socialist Workers' Party (PSTU)	50

=== Senator ===
Party	Candidate	Most relevant political office or occupation	Party	Candidates for Alternate Senators	Coalition	Electoral number
Workers' Party (PT)	Eduardo Suplicy	Senator for São Paulo (1991–2015)	Party of the Republic (PR)	1st alternate senator: Tadeu Candelária	To Truly Change: Workers' Party (PT); Communist Party of Brazil (PCdoB); Party of the Republic (PR); Free Fatherland Party (PPL)	131
Workers' Party (PT)	Eduardo Suplicy	Senator for São Paulo (1991–2015)	Workers' Party (PT)	2nd alternate senator: Rozane Sena	To Truly Change: Workers' Party (PT); Communist Party of Brazil (PCdoB); Party of the Republic (PR); Free Fatherland Party (PPL)	131
Brazilian Labour Party (PTB)	Marlene Campos Machado	Entrepreneur and former president of PTB women's wing	Brazilian Labour Party (PTB)	1st alternate senator: Antônio Alves da Silva	—N/a	140
Brazilian Labour Party (PTB)	Marlene Campos Machado	Entrepreneur and former president of PTB women's wing	Brazilian Labour Party (PTB)	2nd alternate senator: José Francisco Viddoto	—N/a	140
United Socialist Workers' Party (PSTU)	Ana Luiza Gomes	Federal public servant	United Socialist Workers' Party (PSTU)	1st alternate senator: Anízio Batista	Left-Wing Front: Socialism and Liberty Party (PSOL); United Socialist Workers' Party (PSTU)	161
United Socialist Workers' Party (PSTU)	Ana Luiza Gomes	Federal public servant	United Socialist Workers' Party (PSTU)	2nd alternate senator: Wilson Ribeiro	Left-Wing Front: Socialism and Liberty Party (PSOL); United Socialist Workers' Party (PSTU)	161
Brazilian Communist Party (PCB)	Edmilson Costa	Economist and university professor	Brazilian Communist Party (PCB)	1st alternate senator: Fernando Zingra	—N/a	210
Brazilian Communist Party (PCB)	Edmilson Costa	Economist and university professor	Brazilian Communist Party (PCB)	2nd alternate senator: César Mangolin	—N/a	210
Brazilian Labour Renewal Party (PRTB)	Ricardo Flaquer	Lawyer	Brazilian Labour Renewal Party (PRTB)	1st alternate senator: Felipe Flaquer	—N/a	281
Brazilian Labour Renewal Party (PRTB)	Ricardo Flaquer	Lawyer	Brazilian Labour Renewal Party (PRTB)	2nd alternate senator: Gilberto Ferreira	—N/a	281
Green Party (PV)	Kaká Werá	Writer and environmentalist	Green Party (PV)	1st alternate senator: Jean Nascimento	—N/a	430
Green Party (PV)	Kaká Werá	Writer and environmentalist	Green Party (PV)	2nd alternate senator: Cláudio Vieira	—N/a	430
Progressive Republican Party (PRP)	Fernando Lucas	Entrepreneur	Progressive Republican Party (PRP)	1st alternate senator: José Ramires	United for São Paulo: Humanist Party of Solidarity (PHS); Progressive Republican Party (PRP)	441
Progressive Republican Party (PRP)	Fernando Lucas	Entrepreneur	Humanist Party of Solidarity (PHS)	2nd alternate senator: João Duarte	United for São Paulo: Humanist Party of Solidarity (PHS); Progressive Republican Party (PRP)	441
Brazilian Social Democracy Party (PSDB)	José Serra	Governor of São Paulo (2007–2010)	Brazilian Social Democracy Party (PSDB)	1st alternate senator: José Aníbal	This is São Paulo: Brazilian Social Democracy Party (PSDB); Brazilian Socialist Party (PSB); Democrats (DEM); Brazilian Republican Party (PRB); Solidariedade (SD); Social Christian Party (PSC); Popular Socialist Party (PPS); Christian Labour Party (PTC); National Labour Party (PTN); Social Liberal Party (PSL); Party of National Mobilization (PMN); National Ecologic Party (PEN); Christian Social Democratic Party (PSDC); Labour Party of Brazil (PTdoB)	456
Brazilian Social Democracy Party (PSDB)	José Serra	Governor of São Paulo (2007–2010)	Brazilian Republican Party (PRB)	2nd alternate senator: Atílio Francisco	This is São Paulo: Brazilian Social Democracy Party (PSDB); Brazilian Socialist Party (PSB); Democrats (DEM); Brazilian Republican Party (PRB); Solidariedade (SD); Social Christian Party (PSC); Popular Socialist Party (PPS); Christian Labour Party (PTC); National Labour Party (PTN); Social Liberal Party (PSL); Party of National Mobilization (PMN); National Ecologic Party (PEN); Christian Social Democratic Party (PSDC); Labour Party of Brazil (PTdoB)	456
Social Democratic Party (PSD)	Gilberto Kassab	Mayor of São Paulo (2006–2013)	Social Democratic Party (PSD)	1st alternate senator: Alda Marco Antônio	São Paulo Wants the Best: Brazilian Democratic Movement Party (PMDB); Democratic Labour Party (PDT); Social Democratic Party (PSD); Progressive Party (PP); Republican Party of the Social Order (PROS)	555
Social Democratic Party (PSD)	Gilberto Kassab	Mayor of São Paulo (2006–2013)	Social Democratic Party (PSD)	2nd alternate senator: Alfredo Cotait Neto	São Paulo Wants the Best: Brazilian Democratic Movement Party (PMDB); Democratic Labour Party (PDT); Social Democratic Party (PSD); Progressive Party (PP); Republican Party of the Social Order (PROS)	555

=== Candidacy denied ===
Party	Candidate	Most relevant political office or occupation	Party	Candidates for Alternate Senators	Coalition	Electoral number
Workers' Cause Party (PCO)	Juraci Garcia	Administrator	Workers' Cause Party (PCO)	1st alternate senator: Afonso Teixeira Filho	—N/a	290
Workers' Cause Party (PCO)	Juraci Garcia	Administrator	Workers' Cause Party (PCO)	2nd alternate senator: Cláudio Viana	—N/a	290

== Debates ==
2014 São Paulo gubernatorial election debates
No.	Date	Hosts	Moderators	Participants						
Key: P Present A Absent				PSDB	PMDB	PT	PV	PSOL	PRTB	PHS
Key: P Present A Absent				Alckmin	Skaf	Padilha	Natalini	Maringoni	Ciglioni	Benko
1	Saturday, 23 August 2014	Rede Bandeirantes	Boris Casoy	A	P	P	P	P	P	P
2	Monday, 25 August 2014	SBT, Folha de S. Paulo, Jovem Pan, UOL	Carlos Nascimento	P	P	P	P	P	P	P
3	Friday, 26 September 2014	RecordTV, R7	Eduardo Ribeiro	P	P	P	P	P	P	P
4	Tuesday, 30 September 2014	Rede Globo, G1	César Tralli	P	P	P	P	P	P	P

== Opinions polls ==
=== Governor ===
View source data.

Pollster/client(s)	Date(s) conducted	Sample size	Alckmin PSDB	Skaf PMDB/PSB	Padilha PT	Mercadante PT	Lula PT	Cardozo PT	Kassab PSD	Others	Abst. Undec.	Lead
2014 election	5 Oct	–	57.31%	21.53%	18.22%	–	–	–	–	2.94%	17.08%	35.78%
Ibope	1–4 Oct	2,002	45%	19%	11%	–	–	–	–	2%	21%	26%
Datafolha	3–4 Oct	3,119	51%	21%	11%	–	–	–	–	3%	15%	30%
Datafolha	1–2 Oct	2,112	50%	22%	11%	–	–	–	–	3%	14%	28%
Datafolha	29–30 Sep	2,132	49%	23%	10%	–	–	–	–	2%	14%	26%
Ibope	27–29 Sep	2,002	45%	19%	11%	–	–	–	–	1%	23%	26%
Datafolha	25–26 Sep	2,114	51%	22%	9%	–	–	–	–	2%	16%	29%
Ibope	20–22 Sep	2,002	49%	17%	8%	–	–	–	–	3%	23%	32%
Datafolha	8–9 Sep	2,046	49%	22%	9%	–	–	–	–	2%	17%	27%
Ibope	6–8 Sep	2,002	48%	18%	8%	–	–	–	–	3%	22%	30%
Datafolha	2–3 Sep	2,054	53%	22%	7%	–	–	–	–	3%	15%	31%
Ibope	30 Aug–1 Sep	1,806	47%	23%	7%	–	–	–	–	3%	19%	24%
Ibope	23–25 Aug	1,512	50%	20%	5%	–	–	–	–	3%	21%	30%
Datafolha	12–13 Aug	2,045	55%	16%	5%	–	–	–	–	3%	19%	39%
Ibope	26–28 Jul	1,512	50%	11%	5%	–	–	–	–	5%	29%	39%
Datafolha	15–16 Jul	1,978	54%	16%	4%	–	–	–	–	4%	23%	38%
Veritá	1–5 Jul	2,208	56.4%	17.2%	4.5%	–	–	–	–	1.2%	20.6%	39.2%
Datafolha	3–5 Jun	2,029	44%	21%	3%	–	–	–	5%	2%	26%	23%
Datafolha	3–5 Jun	2,029	47%	21%	4%	–	–	–	–	2%	26%	26%
Datafolha	28–29 Nov 2013	1,723	43%	19%	4%	–	–	8%	–	–	26%	24%
Datafolha	6–7 Jun 2013	1,642	52%	16%	3%	–	–	–	9%	–	19%	36%
Datafolha	6–7 Jun 2013	1,642	50%	15%	–	11%	–	–	8%	–	15%	35%
Datafolha	6–7 Jun 2013	1,642	52%	16%	–	–	–	5%	8%	–	18%	36%
Datafolha	6–7 Jun 2013	1,642	42%	13%	–	–	26%	–	6%	–	12%	16%
2010 election	3 Oct 2010	–	50.63%	4.57%	–	35.23%	–	–	–	9.57%	10.10%	15.40%

=== Senator ===
View source data.

Pollster/client(s)	Date(s) conducted	Sample size	Serra PSDB	Suplicy PT	Kassab PSD	Afif DEM/PFL	Antônio PMDB	Others	Abst. Undec.	Lead
2014 election	5 Oct	–	58.49%	32.53%	5.94%	–	–	3.04%	26.22%	25.96%
Ibope	1–4 Oct	2,002	36%	27%	7%	–	–	4%	24%	9%
Datafolha	3–4 Oct	3,119	41%	30%	7%	–	–	4%	17%	11%
Datafolha	1–2 Oct	2,112	39%	33%	8%	–	–	4%	17%	6%
Datafolha	29–30 Sep	2,132	39%	30%	9%	–	–	3%	18%	9%
Datafolha	25–26 Sep	2,114	37%	30%	10%	–	–	3%	19%	7%
Ibope	20–22 Sep	2,002	34%	25%	5%	–	–	4%	30%	9%
Datafolha	8–9 Sep	2,046	34%	31%	9%	–	–	6%	19%	3%
Ibope	6–8 Sep	2,002	33%	27%	7%	–	–	2%	29%	6%
Datafolha	2–3 Sep	2,054	35%	32%	8%	–	–	6%	19%	3%
Ibope	30 Aug–1 Sep	1,806	33%	28%	8%	–	–	4%	25%	5%
Ibope	23–25 Aug	1,512	33%	24%	7%	–	–	6%	30%	9%
Datafolha	12–13 Aug	2,045	33%	30%	7%	–	–	9%	21%	3%
2006 election	1 Oct 2006	–	–	47.82%	–	43.70%	4.95%	3.53%	10.09%	4.12%

== Results ==
=== Governor ===
Candidate	Running mate	Party	Votes	%
Geraldo Alckmin (incumbent)	Márcio França (PSB)	PSDB	12,230,807	57.31
Paulo Skaf	José Roberto Batochio (PDT)	PMDB	4,594,708	21.53
Alexandre Padilha	Nivaldo Santana (PCdoB)	PT	3,888,584	18.22
Gilberto Natalini	Maria Lúcia Haidar	PV	260,686	1.22
Gilberto Maringoni	Hildete Nepomuceno	PSOL	187,487	0.88
Laércio Benko	Sérgio Contente	PHS	132,042	0.62
Walter Ciglioni	Marcelo Ayres Duarte	PRTB	22,822	0.11
Wagner Farias	Ivan Hermine	PCB	12,958	0.06
Raimundo Sena	Ulisses Coelho	PCO	11,118	0.05
Total			21,341,212	100.00
Valid votes			21,341,212	82.92
Invalid votes			2,374,946	9.23
Blank votes			2,020,613	7.85
Total votes			25,736,771	100.00
Registered voters/turnout			31,979,717	80.48
PSDB hold				

Popular vote
Alckmin	57.31%
Skaf	21.53%
Padilha	18.22%
Others	2.94%

=== Senator ===
Candidate	Party	Votes	%
José Serra	PSDB	11,105,874	57.92
Eduardo Suplicy (incumbent)	PT	6,176,499	32.21
Gilberto Kassab	PSD	1,128,582	5.89
Marlene Campos Machado	PTB	330,302	1.72
Kaká Werá	PV	186,598	0.97
Fernando Lucas	PRP	118,758	0.62
Ana Luiza	PSTU	101,131	0.53
Ricardo Fláquer	PRTB	14,833	0.08
Edmilson Costa	PCB	12,102	0.06
Juraci Garcia	PCO	0	0.00
Total		19,174,679	100.00
Valid votes		19,174,679	74.50
Invalid votes		3,666,813	14.25
Blank votes		2,895,289	11.25
Total votes		25,736,781	100.00
Registered voters/turnout		31,979,717	80.48
PSDB gain from PT			

Popular vote
Serra	58.49%
Suplicy	32.53%
Kassab	5.94%
Others	3.04%

=== Chamber of Deputies ===
Party	Votes	%	Seats	+/–
Brazilian Social Democracy Party	4,139,629	19.72	14	▲1
Workers' Party	2,956,439	14.08	10	▲5
Brazilian Republican Party	2,225,369	10.60	8	▲6
Party of the Republic	1,701,667	8.10	6	▲2
Brazilian Socialist Party	1,192,210	5.68	4	▼2
Green Party	955,373	4.55	3	▼2
Social Democratic Party	936,889	4.46	5	New
Democrats	882,582	4.20	4	▼2
Social Christian Party	828,477	3.95	3	▲1
Brazilian Democratic Movement Party	787,168	3.75	2	▲1
Brazilian Labour Party	701,693	3.34	2	Steady
Progressive Party	526,210	2.51	2	▼2
Popular Socialist Party	515,419	2.45	2	▼1
Solidariedade	501,003	2.39	1	New
Democratic Labour Party	451,466	2.15	1	▼2
Socialism and Liberty Party	429,816	2.05	1	Steady
Communist Party of Brazil	213,564	1.02	1	▼1
National Ecologic Party	176,184	0.84	0	New
Humanist Party of Solidarity	167,151	0.80	0	Steady
National Labour Party	163,321	0.78	1	▲1
Republican Party of the Social Order	134,473	0.64	0	New
Social Liberal Party	91,971	0.44	0	Steady
Progressive Republican Party	85,054	0.41	0	Steady
Labour Party of Brazil	33,906	0.16	0	Steady
Brazilian Labour Renewal Party	33,397	0.16	0	Steady
United Socialist Workers' Party	33,176	0.16	0	Steady
Party of National Mobilization	33,061	0.16	0	Steady
Christian Social Democratic Party	30,083	0.14	0	Steady
Christian Labour Party	27,927	0.13	0	Steady
Free Fatherland Party	25,138	0.12	0	Steady
Brazilian Communist Party	10,853	0.05	0	Steady
Workers' Cause Party	5,343	0.03	0	Steady
Total	20,996,012	100.00	70	–
Valid votes	20,996,012	81.58		
Invalid votes	2,314,525	8.99		
Blank votes	2,426,244	9.43		
Total votes	25,736,781	100.00		
Registered voters/turnout	31,979,717	80.48		

=== Legislative Assembly ===
Party	Votes	%	Seats	+/–
Brazilian Social Democracy Party	5,113,976	24.94	22	Steady
Workers' Party	2,975,895	14.51	15	▼9
Green Party	1,275,526	6.22	6	▼3
Democrats	1,250,922	6.10	8	Steady
Brazilian Socialist Party	1,177,204	5.74	5	▲2
Brazilian Democratic Movement Party	1,000,277	4.88	4	▼1
Social Democratic Party	808,258	3.94	4	New
Social Christian Party	622,238	3.03	3	▼1
Party of the Republic	615,025	3.00	3	▲2
Brazilian Labour Party	606,144	2.96	3	▼1
Brazilian Republican Party	579,337	2.83	4	▲2
Popular Socialist Party	560,130	2.73	3	▼1
Communist Party of Brazil	503,474	2.46	2	Steady
Socialism and Liberty Party	485,147	2.37	2	▲1
National Ecologic Party	440,348	2.15	2	New
Progressive Party	436,129	2.13	2	▲1
Solidariedade	405,073	1.98	2	New
Democratic Labour Party	400,555	1.95	1	▼1
Humanist Party of Solidarity	233,147	1.14	1	▲1
National Labour Party	197,333	0.96	1	▲1
Social Liberal Party	169,699	0.83	1	▲1
Progressive Republican Party	165,817	0.81	0	Steady
Republican Party of the Social Order	120,661	0.59	0	New
Labour Party of Brazil	82,288	0.40	0	Steady
Christian Labour Party	70,560	0.34	0	Steady
Brazilian Labour Renewal Party	60,310	0.29	0	Steady
Free Fatherland Party	42,924	0.21	0	Steady
Party of National Mobilization	35,420	0.17	0	Steady
United Socialist Workers' Party	33,865	0.17	0	Steady
Christian Social Democratic Party	32,966	0.16	0	Steady
Workers' Cause Party	4,617	0.02	0	Steady
Total	20,505,265	100.00	94	–
Valid votes	20,505,265	79.67		
Invalid votes	2,612,027	10.15		
Blank votes	2,619,489	10.18		
Total votes	25,736,781	100.00		
Registered voters/turnout	31,979,717	80.48		
