= José Roberto Batochio =

Brazilian lawyer

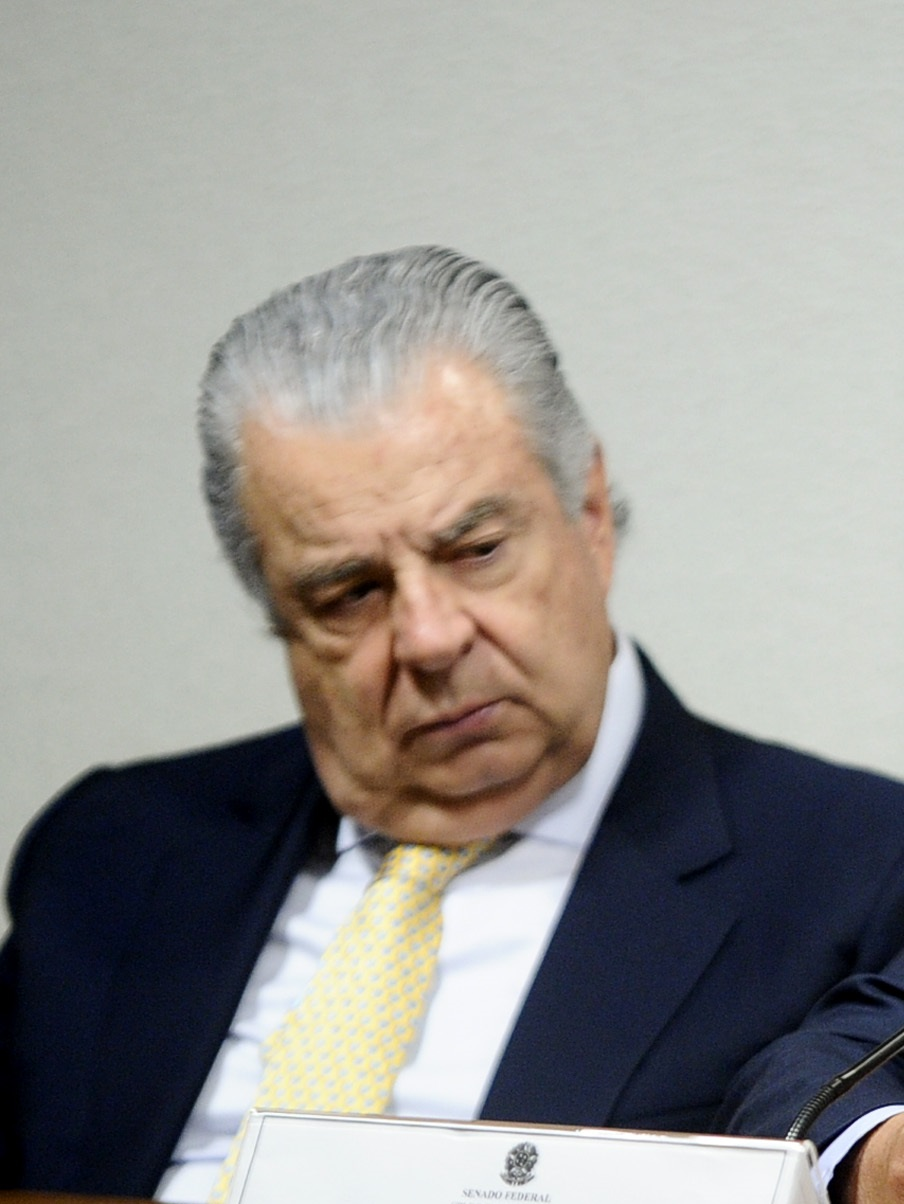

Federal deputy for São Paulo
- In office 1998–2002

Personal details
- Born: José Roberto Batochio; 17 April 1944 (age 82) Dois Córregos, São Paulo, Brazil
- Party: PDT
- Education: Mackenzie Presbyterian University
- Occupation: Lawyer, politician

José Roberto Batochio (born 17 April 1944) is a Brazilian lawyer and politician. He served as a federal deputy from the state of São Paulo from 1998 to 2002. He was the president of the Order of Attorneys of Brazil (OAB) from 1993 to 1995. He is a member of the Democratic Labour Party (PDT).

== Biography ==
Born in 1944 in Dois Córregos and raised in Avaré, Batochio is of Italian descent. He graduated with a law degree from Mackenzie Presbyterian University in 1967. Known for his work as a criminal defense lawyer, he was president of the Association of Attorneys of São Paulo from 1985 to 1986, as well as the president of the São Paulo state branch of the OAB. From 1993 to 1995, he was the president of the national OAB, of which he is an honorary and lifetime member. He is also a member of the Interamerican Federation of Lawyers, as well as the Institute of Brazilian Attorneys (IAB). During his time as a lawyer, he has represented various clients from across the political spectrum, such as president Luiz Inácio Lula da Silva, Paulo Maluf, Antonio Palocci, and Valdemar Costa Neto. In September 2009, he was awarded the Maneco Dionísio medal by the city of Avaré.

Batochio was elected as a federal deputy for the state of São Paulo from 1998 to 2002, as part of the PDT. He became a member of the PDT at the urging of its then president Leonel Brizola. He was the vice-gubernatorial candidate for Paulo Skaf, at that time part of the Brazilian Democratic Movement (PMDB), during the 2014 São Paulo gubernatorial election. They came in a distant second place to Geraldo Alckmin of the Brazilian Social Democracy Party (PSDB).

During the trial of Lula before the Supreme Federal Court on 23 March 2018, Batochio gave oral arguments to justices Gilmar Mendes and Dias Toffoli in defense of civil liberties and fundamental guarantees to citizens that were considered historic. His defenses of Lula, however, were not enough to avoid him being sentenced to prison.
