= Cristiano Zanin =

Brazilian Supreme Court Justice

His Excellency Cristiano Zanin
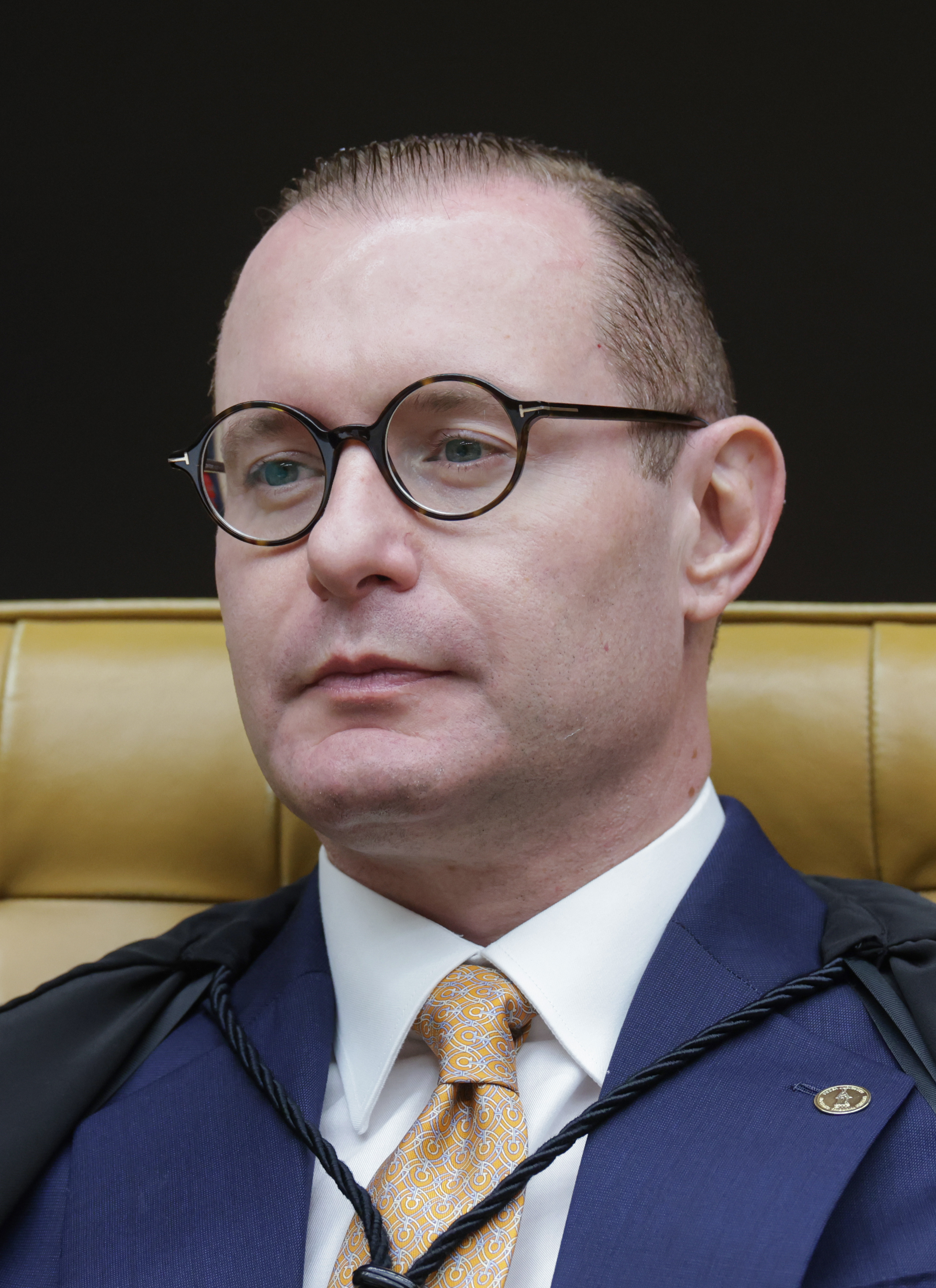
- Zanin in 2026

Justice of the Supreme Federal Court
- Incumbent
- Assumed office 3 August 2023
- Appointed by: Luiz Inácio Lula da Silva
- Preceded by: Ricardo Lewandowski

Personal details
- Born: Cristiano Zanin Martins; 15 November 1975 (age 50) Piracicaba, São Paulo, Brazil
- Spouse: Valeska Teixeira (m. 2004)
- Children: 3
- Education: Pontifical Catholic University of São Paulo (LL.B.)
- Occupation: Attorney, professor

Cristiano Zanin Martins (Note: Portuguese pronunciation: [kɾistʃiˈɐnu zaˈnĩ maɾˈtʃĩs].) (born 15 November 1975) is a Brazilian attorney and law professor who serves as a justice of the Supreme Federal Court. He gained notoriety as a personal attorney of president Luiz Inácio Lula da Silva in lawsuits related to Operation Car Wash.

On 1 June 2023, Zanin was appointed by president Lula da Silva as Justice of the Supreme Federal Court, replacing retired Justice Ricardo Lewandowski. His nomination was approved by the Federal Senate in a voting of 58–18 on 21 June 2023.

== Early life and academics ==
The son of Maria Roseli Zanin and Nelson Martins, Cristiano Zanin was born in Piracicaba into a middle-class family and moved to São Paulo in 1994 to study at the Law School of the Pontifical Catholic University of São Paulo (PUC-SP), graduating in 1999. He concluded a specialization in civil procedure at the same university.

He taught civil law at the Autonomous School of Law (FADISP) in São Paulo.

Zanin is one of the authors of the book "Lawfare: uma introdução", which talks about "the strategic use of Law for political, geopolitical, military and commercial objectives" and founded in 2018 the Lawfare Institute for the production of content about the subject and analysis on real cases.

== Career ==
=== Attorneyship ===
Zanin began his attorneyship in 2000 as an attorney at the office of Arruda Alvim, where he was an intern during college. In 2004, he became partner of Teixeira Martins Attorneys-at-law.

In 2022, he opened his own attorney office, in a partnership with his wife Valeska Martins, daughter of his former partner Roberto Teixeira.

He had worked in business lawsuits and judicial recoveries, dedicating in famous cases such as Varig's judicial recovery, (Note: "Judicial recovery" is the Brazilian law equivalent of a Company voluntary arrangement in the United Kingdom, or Chapter 11, Title 11 of the United States Code.) TransBrasil bankruptcy proceedings and the lenience agreement review of J&F Investimentos. In the end of January 2023, Zanin was hired by Lojas Americanas to work in a lawsuit against BTG Pactual.

Zanin is also member of the Institute of Brazilian Attorneys (IAB), of the São Paulo Attorneys Association (AASP) and the International Bar Association (IAB).

=== Lula's attorney ===
Zanin became the attorney of Lula's family in 2013, aged 38 and gained publicity after becoming his defense attorney in a joint work with criminal attorneys José Roberto Batochio and Luiz Felipe Mallmann de Magalhães in lawsuits related to investigations of Operation Car Wash.

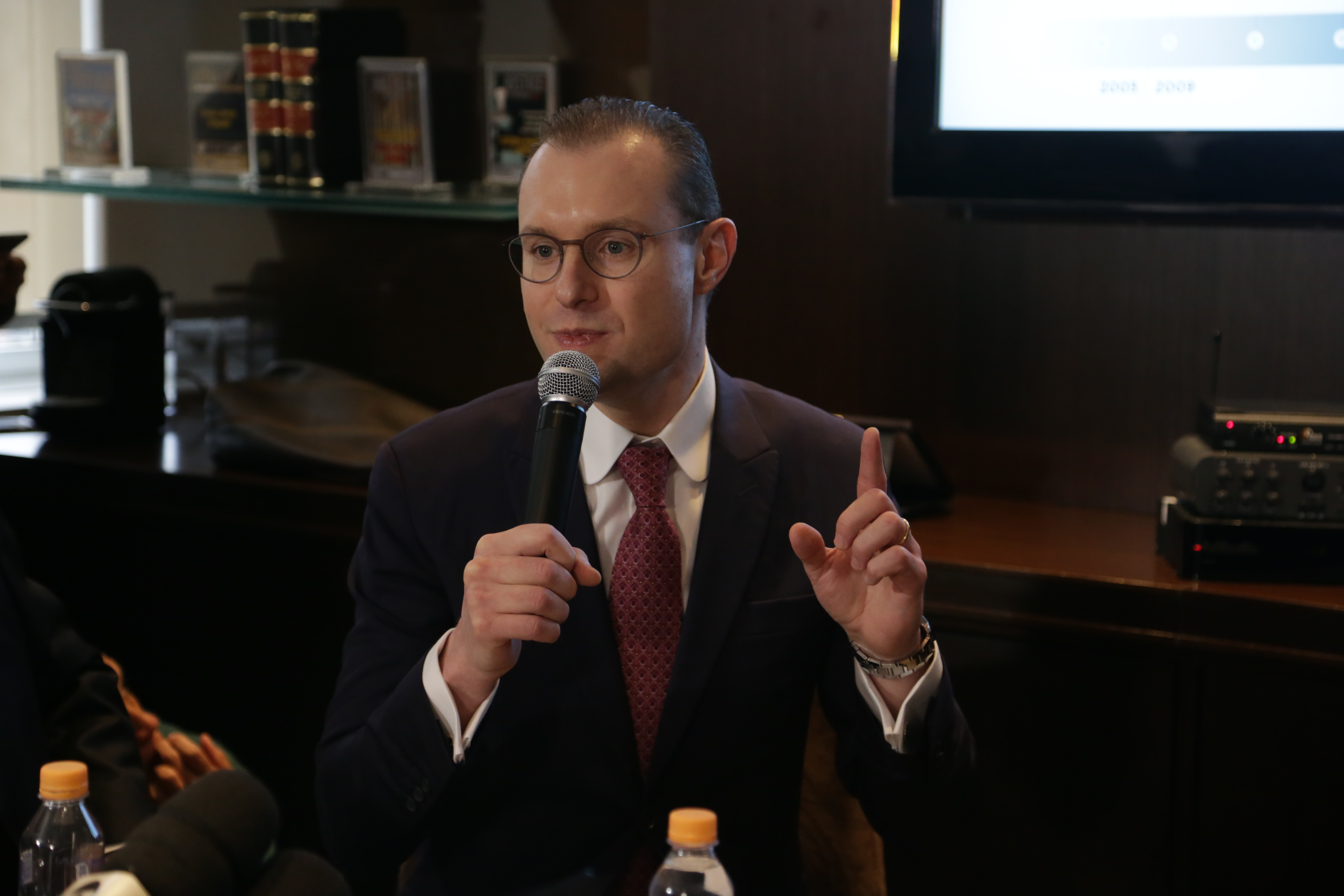
Cristiano Zanin in a press conference.

In September 2020, in a subphase of Operation Car Wash, judge Marcelo Bretas ordered a search and seizure in houses of attorneys whose offices provided services for Sistema S. Among the offices investigated were those of Zanin and Frederick Wassef, former attorney of Jair Bolsonaro.

Zanin stated that the complaint was a retaliation to his work as defense attorney of president Lula and added that "this is the goal of Car Wash. Remove me or reduce my time in the defense of president Lula and in other cases I work in. But this is not going to happen." Zanin stated that Bretas had sympathy for president Bolsonaro. The Order of Attorneys of Brazil (OAB) saw the operation as "a clear initiative of criminalization of Brazilian attorneyship". The complaint was later archived.

Zanin sustained the thesis of suspicion of the judge Sergio Moro, stating that Operation Car Wash violated the rules of due process in cases involving Lula, once the judge assisted the prosecution.

In 2021, a habeas corpus request filed in the Supreme Federal Court by Lula's attorneys resulted in the repeal of Lula's convictions related to Operation Car Wash, as the court acknowledged the partiality of Sergio Moro, repealing his rulings.

Consequently, the political rights of Lula were restored, allowing his candidacy in the 2022 elections, which he was elected President of Brazil for the third time.

=== Politics ===
Zanin participated in the coordination of the presidential campaign of Luiz Inácio Lula da Silva in the 2022 elections.

In November 2022, he was designated to compose a technical group on Justice and Public Security in the presidential transition cabinet. Zanin was responsible for the report of International Judiciary Cooperation and National Strategy of Fight against Corruption and Money Laundering (ENCCLA).

=== Threats in airport ===
On 11 January 2023, during the aftermath of the events against the Three Powers building in Brasília perpetrated by supporters of former president Jair Bolsonaro, Zanin was approached by Bolsonaro supporters in the restroom of the Brasília International Airport, where he was filmed while being insulted and threatened. In the video, the offender stated that Zanin should be assaulted for being part of Lula's defense. Zanin remained calm and regretted what happened, as well as he hoped the persons responsible for the attack would be punished. The man responsible for the recording, a 29-year-old entrepreneur, was identified and indicted for threatening, injury, and incitement.

== Supreme Federal Court ==
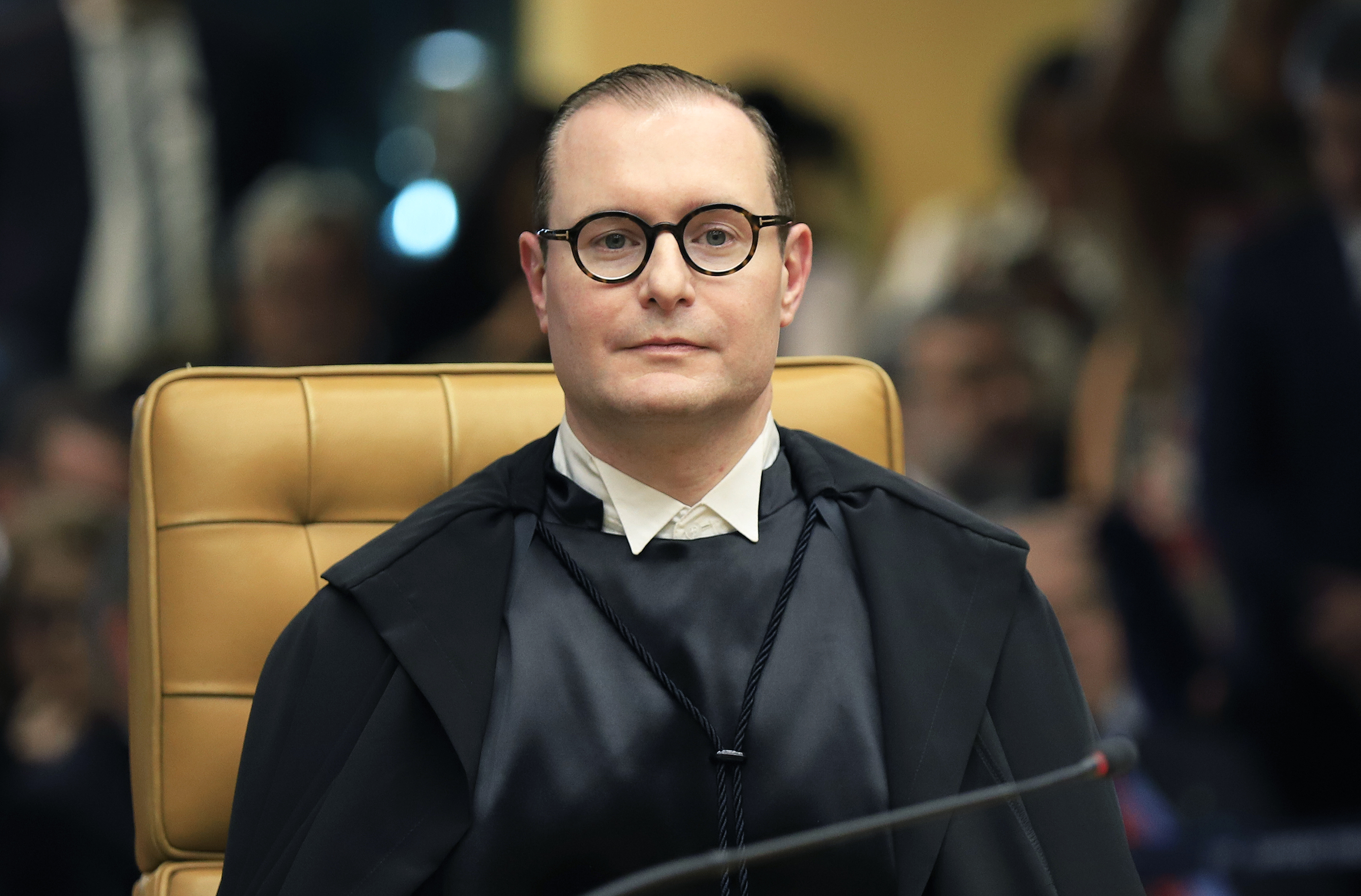
Zanin after taking office, August 3, 2023

After the election of Lula for president, Zanin was considered for Justice of the Supreme Federal Court.

For the fact he had acted as personal attorney of the president, his possible nomination was heavily criticized, both from the opposition and from personal allies and supporters of Lula administration.

On the other hand, Zanin received the support of attorney advocates, the President of the Senate Rodrigo Pacheco and from justices of the Supreme Court. Justice Luís Roberto Barroso (who was appointed by Lula's former Chief-of-Staff Dilma Rousseff) affirmed that he couldn't see in an eventual nomination "any ethical, nor moral conflict, nor violation of impersonality". Justice Cármen Lúcia (who was appointed by Lula) evaluated that Zanin meets the constitutional requirements of remarkable legal knowledge and unblemished reputation. Justice Gilmar Mendes stated: "I don't see any obstacle for Zanin's nomination, which I consider a good attorney a many times misunderstood".

Zanin was officially nominated on 1 June 2023, aged 47, for the vacant position of retired justice Ricardo Lewandowski.

On 21 June 2023, Zanin had a public hearing in the Federal Senate, with his nomination approved on the same day at the Constitution and Justice Committee in a voting of 21–5 and by the floor in a voting of 58–18.

== Personal life ==
Zanin is a Roman Catholic. He has been married since 2004 to attorney Valeska Teixeira Zanin Martins, with whom he has three children. Zanin is a fan of São Paulo Futebol Clube.

== Notes ==
Legal offices
Preceded by Ricardo Lewandowski	Justice of the Supreme Federal Court; 2023–present	Incumbent
