= Popular Bloc (Lebanon) =

Popular Bloc الكتلة الشعبية
- Leader: Myriam Skaff
- Founder: Joseph Skaff
- Founded: 1947
- Headquarters: Zahlé, Lebanon
- Ideology: Development of Zahlé; Christian democracy
- Parliament of Lebanon: 0 / 128
- Cabinet of Lebanon: 0 / 30

The Skaff Bloc or Popular Bloc (Arabic: الكتلة الشعبية) is a political party and an electoral coalition in the Lebanese Parliament that aligned with the Free Patriotic Movement from 2005 to 2009. It is led by Myriam Skaff.

== History ==
The bloc was initially founded by Joseph Skaff who supported multiple candidates in the Beqaa region to run under his electoral lists. The lists were successful between 1947 and 1972.

During the 21st century it became a part of the current Lebanese opposition Change and Reform bloc, headed by Michel Aoun. In 2005, they manage to obtain most of the seats in the Zahle district. In 2009, the party lost all its deputies after the victory of the 14 March alliance in the district. After the death of Elias Skaff on 10 October 2015, his wife, Myriam Skaff, took control of the party. During the Lebanese municipal election of 2016 in Zahle, an attempt at forging an electoral coalition with the Free Patriotic Movement and the Lebanese Forces failed, prompting the Popular bloc to run against the Christian parties and Nicolas Fattouche list. The alliance broke definitively with the Change and Reform bloc.

The party resumed operations during the 2018 Lebanese general elections, but failed to win any seats with 10,563 votes in total.

=== 2022 general elections ===
Myriam Skaff headed a 6-member list in the district of Zahle during the 2022 Lebanese general election but failed to win any seats. In total they managed to receive 11,501 votes which was 938 more than the last elections. The votes were distributed as such: Myriam Skaff of the Greek Catholic seat received 4825, Maroun Makhoul of the Maronite seat received 317 votes, Sami Nabhan of the Greek Orthodox received 274 votes, Mohammad Hammoud of the Sunni seat received 5869 votes, Fawzat Dalloul of the Shiite seat received 83 votes and Narik Ibrahimian of the Armenian Orthodox seat received 133 votes.
