= Joseph J. Skaff =

United States Army general

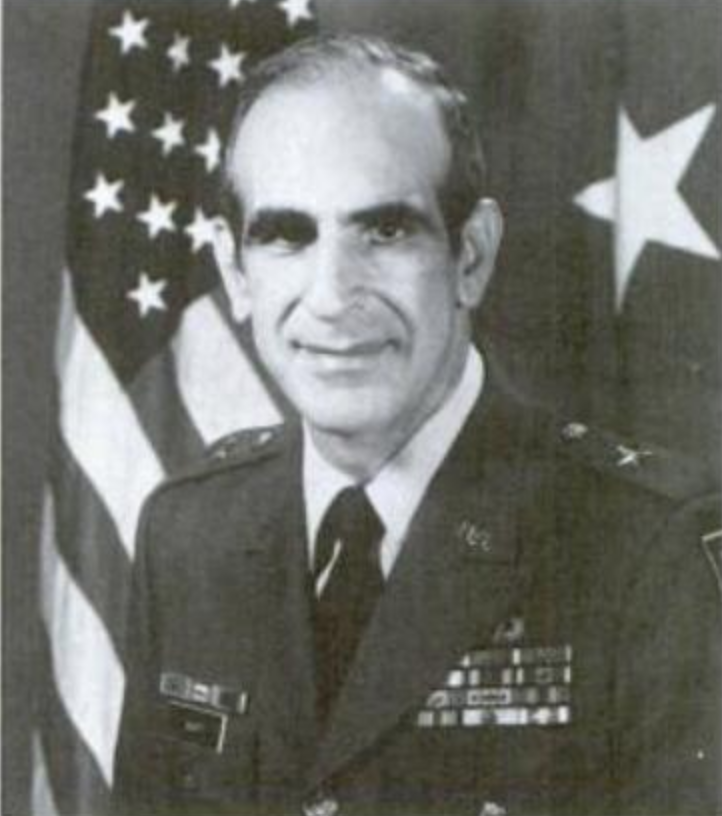
- Pictured as a brigadier general
- Born: 13 June 1930 (age 96); Charleston, West Virginia U.S.
- Military career
- Allegiance: United States
- Branch: United States Army
- Service years: 1950s–1989
- Rank: Major general
- Commands: Fort Devens

Joseph John Skaff (born 13 June 1930) is a retired major general in the United States Army who served as Commander of Fort Devens. He is a 1955 graduate of the United States Military Academy.

== Early life ==
Joseph Skaff was born in Charleston, West Virginia, to Lebanese Greek Orthodox parents Michael J. Skaff and Zahia Skaff. Michael's father had arrived in the United States in the 1890s and came to own six apartment buildings on the site of what is now Saint Francis Hospital in Charleston. Zahia had arrived from Aitha al-Sakah, Lebanon at the age of 16. He had three siblings, a brother George (who died at the age of seven) and sisters Pauline and Elizabeth (who died at the age of six).

As he grow up, his family regularly attended Saint George Cathedral, in Toledo, Ohio, an Antiochian Orthodox church three blocks down from their residence. Skaff is still a member of the vibrant Syro-Lebanese community there.

== Career ==
He served in Korea, Japan, Hawaii, and Vietnam.
