= Myriam Skaff =

Lebanese politician (born 1968)

- ميريام سكاف

Leader of the Popular Bloc
- Incumbent
- Assumed office October 10, 2015
- Preceded by: Elias Skaff

Personal details
- Born: Myriam Gibran Tawk; 1968 (age 57–58)
- Party: Popular Bloc
- Spouse: Elias Skaff
- Children: Joseph and Gibran
- Parent: Gibran Tawk (father)

Myriam Gebran Tawk (Arabic: ميريام جبران طوق; born 1968) is a Lebanese politician who is a prominent member of the Skaff family in the city of Zahlé and the leader of the Popular Bloc, succeeding her late husband Elias Skaff.

== Early life and education ==
Skaff completed her secondary education at the Athenee de Beyrouth school. She holds a BA in Social Sciences from the American International University in London-Richmond, followed by a secondary diploma in Women's Studies and later worked in the field of marketing in two French companies.

== In politics ==
Following the death of Elias Skaff on October 10, 2015, she was elected head of the Popular Bloc and fought her first political battle in 2016. During the Lebanese municipal election of 2016 in Zahle, an attempt at forging an electoral coalition with the Free Patriotic Movement and the Lebanese Forces failed, prompting the Popular bloc to run against the Christian parties and Nicolas Fattouche list. The alliance broke definitively with the Change and Reform bloc.

The party resumed operations during the 2018 Lebanese general elections, however failed to win any seats with 10,563 votes in total. Skaff claimed that supporters of the Lebanese Forces had attacked her car.

In 2022, Myriam Skaff announced her candidacy of the Greek catholic seat in Bekaa I (Zahle) and led a 6-member list in the electoral district but failed to win any seats.

== Personal life ==
In 1995, she married former minister and MP Elias Skaff and has 2 children: Joseph and Gibran. Myriam Skaff is also the cousin of Sethrida Geagea, wife of Lebanese Forces Chief Samir Geagea.

== See also ==
- Political families in Lebanon
- Popular Bloc
