= Eddie Demirjian =

Lebanese politician

Eddie Boghous Demirjian (Arabic: ادي بوغوس دمرجيان) is a Lebanese Armenian Orthodox politician.

Demirjian contested the 2009 Lebanese general election, standing as a candidate in the Zahle electoral district. He obtained 2 votes.

He again contested the Armenian Orthodox seat in Zahle in the 2018 Lebanese general election, standing on the list of Nicolas Fattouch. He was elected, having received 77 preference votes.
