= Joseph Skaff =

Lebanese politician

Joseph Elias Tohme Skaf
- Born: 1922
- Died: 5 November 1991 (aged 68–69)
- Occupation: Politician
- Children: Elias Skaff

Joseph Elias Tohme Skaf (Arabic: جوزيف الياس طعمه سكاف; 1922 – 5 November 1991) was a Lebanese politician and za'im (political boss) who is considered one of the most prominent personalities of the Skaff family in the city of Zahlé. He held several ministerial positions from 1955 to 1988 under five different presidents which include Camille Chamoun, Fouad Chehab, Suleiman Franjieh, Elias Sarkis and Amine Gemayel.

== Political life ==
He was also elected as a deputy for the Catholic seat of the Zahle constituency against Jean Skaff in the years 1957 where he received 16,277 votes, 1960 where he received 16,816 votes, 1964 where he received 17,966 votes and 1972 where he received 22,091. In 1982, he contributed to the election of Bashir Gemayel as President of the Republic by securing the necessary quorum, with the deputies of his bloc. In the early 1970s he founded and chaired "The People's Bloc of Zahle" District Representatives. He was then succeeded as a politician by his son Elias Skaff.

=== Government positions held ===
- Minister of Agriculture from September 19, 1955, until March 19, 1956, in Prime Minister Rashid Karami's government under President Camille Chamoun.
- Minister of Agriculture from March 19, 1956, until June 8, 1956, in the government of President Abdallah El Yafi under President Camille Chamoun.
- Minister of Agriculture from June 8, 1956, until November 18, 1956, in the government of President Abdallah El Yafi under President Camille Chamoun.
- Minister of Social Affairs and Minister of Public Health from August 18, 1957, until March 14, 1958, in the government of Prime Minister Sami Solh under President Camille Chamoun.
- Minister of Social Affairs from March 14, 1958, until September 24, 1958, in the government of President Sami Solh under President Camille Chamoun.
- Minister of Labor and Minister of Social Affairs from August 1, 1960, until May 20, 1961, in the government of President Saeb Salam under President Fouad Chehab.
- Minister of Agriculture from October 31, 1961, until February 20, 1964, in the government of Prime Minister Rashid Karami under President Fouad Chehab.
- Minister of Energy and Water from May 17, 1972, until April 25, 1973, in the government of Prime Minister Saeb Salam under President Suleiman Frangieh.
- Minister of Energy and Water from April 25, 1973, until July 8, 1973, in the government of Prime Minister Amin Al-Hafiz under President Suleiman Frangieh.
- Minister of Energy and Water from July 8, 1973, until October 31, 1974, in the government of Prime Minister Takieddin El-Din El Solh under President Suleiman Franjieh.
- Minister of National Defense from October 31, 1974, until May 23, 1975, in Prime Minister Rashid Solh's government under President Suleiman Frangieh.
- Minister of National Defense and Minister of Agriculture from July 16, 1979, until October 25, 1980, in the government of Selim Hoss under President Élias Sarkis.
- Minister of National Defense from October 25, 1980, until October 7, 1982, in the government of Shafik Wazzan under President Élias Sarkis.
- Minister of Information from April 30, 1984, until September 22, 1988, in the government of Prime Minister Rashid Karami under President Amin Gemayel.

== See also ==
- Lebanese Civil War
- Lebanese Front
- Lebanese National Movement
- Politics of Lebanon
- Zahliote Group
- Za'im system
- Lebanon's Political Families
