= Federação das Indústrias do Estado de São Paulo =

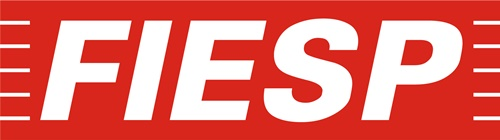
- Abbreviation: FIESP
- Formation: March 28, 1928 (98 years ago)
- Type: Trade Association
- Legal status: Employer's Trade Union Federation
- Headquarters: Luis Eulálio de Bueno Vidigal Filho Building
- Location: São Paulo, Brazil
- Coordinates: 23.562623°S 46.654254°W
- Region served: São Paulo
- President: Paulo Antonio Skaf
- Parent organization: Confederação Nacional da Indústria
- Website: www.fiesp.com.br
- Formerly called: Centro das Indústrias do Estado de São Paulo (1928-1931)

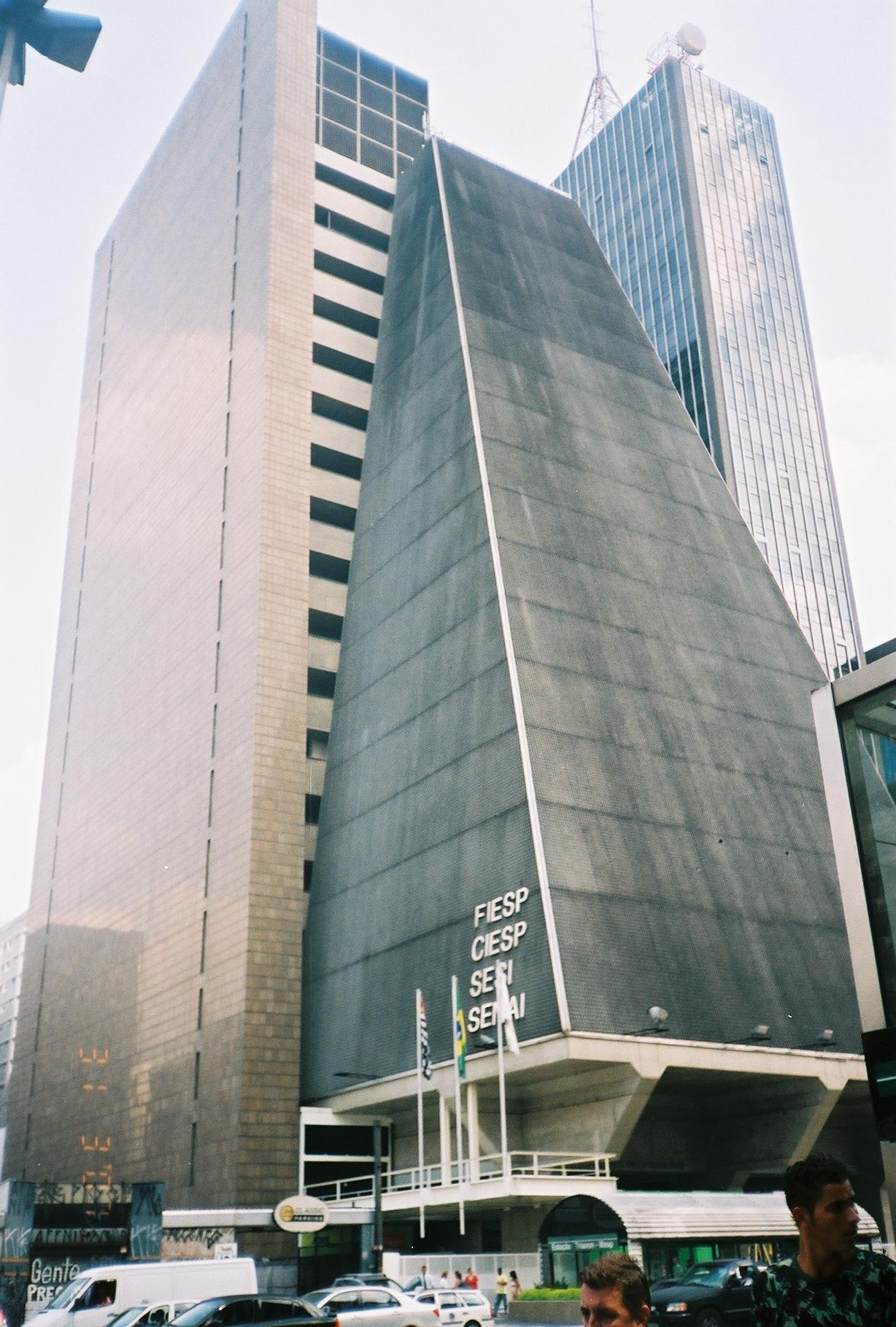
Headquarters of FIESP in São Paulo.

The Federação das Indústrias do Estado de São Paulo (FIESP, Federation of Industries of the State of São Paulo) is a Brazilian industry entity. FIESP is affiliated with the National Industry Confederation (CNI).

FIESP has 52 representative units in the state of São Paulo, representing 133 employer's trade unions and 130,000 industries.

The federation is located in the city of São Paulo. The São Paulo industry building is the location of the Center of Industries of the State of São Paulo (CIESP), the Social Service of the Industry of São Paulo (SESI-SP), the National Service for Industrial Training of São Paulo (SENAI-SP), the Roberto Simonsen Institute (IRS) and the headquarters of several affiliated unions.

Skaf was elected president of the Federation of Industries of the State of São Paulo (FIESP) in 2004. He was re-elected in 2007 and then in 2011 and 2017 again remaining in office until December 31, 2021.

In June 2014, the entrepreneur Benjamin Steinbruch, CEO of the National Steel Company (CSN) and Vicunha Group became president of FIESP, replacing Skaf, who is running for the state of São Paulo government.

In July 2021, businessman Josué Gomes da Silva was elected president of CIESP and Rafael Cervone Netto 1st vice president, along with the new board for the 2022-2025 quadrennium.

== History ==
During the São Paulo Revolt of 1924 led by general Isidoro Dias Lopes, the president of the São Paulo Commercial Association (ACSP), José Carlos de Macedo Soares, remained in São Paulo, which was being bombarded to protect the working-class neighborhoods, factories and shops. When the resistance was defeated, Macedo Soares was accused of cooperating with the revolution and was exiled. As a result, the ACSP became weaker without its president.

In 1928, a group of business owners from the São Paulo Trade Association led by Jorge Street, Francisco Matarazzo and Roberto Simonsen founded the Center of Industries of the State of São Paulo (CIESP), a private association that supports and represents industries interests. In 1931, Matarazzo, Simonsen, Street and a group of business owners founded the Federation of Industries of the State of São Paulo (FIESP) to claim back the industries’ competitiveness in Brazil and to reduce production costs and contain the deindustrialization.

During the government of Getulio Vargas, CIESP and FIESP remained separate. After World War II, both entities returned to work together.

== Acting ==
FIESP has 52 representative units in the state of São Paulo. The federation comprises 133 business associations and 130,000 industries, uniting sectors that make up 42% of Brazil's Gross Domestic Product (GDP).

Skaf was elected president of the Federation of Industries of the State of São Paulo (FIESP), the Industry Social Service (SESI-SP), the National Service for Industrial Training (SENAI-SP) and the Roberto Simonsen Institute (IRS) in 2004. He was re-elected in 2007 and again in 2011.

FIESP has several committees, departments and councils representing different industrial sectors. Among the committees, there exists the FIESP's Young Entrepreneurs Committee (CJE), which is a group of young entrepreneurs who participate in several federation activities, keeping up with meetings of the high councils, departments and other committees. The CJE interacts with several entities to promote entrepreneurship.

FIESP's Cultural Action Committee (Comcultura) is a group that promotes cultural activities, access to art and culture in the community (Diversão Terra). The Social Responsibility Committee of FIESP (Cores) is a group of professionals from several sectors to guide trade unions and industries in social responsibility management, environment and human rights.

FIESP's Chamber of Conciliation, Mediation and Arbitration of São Paulo is engaged in administration, conciliation and arbitration mediation of business conflicts in order to decrease the number of open cases in the courts of Brazil.

== Recent campaigns ==
FIESP led the campaign for approval of the General Law of Micro and Small Enterprises and the free movement of Goods and Services on wheat flour derivatives in 2006, which led to a price reduction of items like bread and pasta in 2006.

In October 2007, FIESP sent a letter to Brazilian business owners that listed the reasons why the Provisional Contribution on the Movement or Transmission of Values, Credits and Financial Nature CPMF should be extinguished. FIESP sent more than 1.3 million signatures against the CPMF to the Constitution and Justice Committee (CCJ) of the Federal Senate of Brazil.

In December of that year, the federal senator designated the end of CPMF's taxes.

Since 2008, the FIESP claimed a tax exemption on basic food products. In 2013, the federal government approved a provisional measure that reduced the Social Integration Program (PIS), Contribution to Social Security Financing (COFINS) and eliminated the industrialized products taxes on basic food products (IPI).

FIESP has also campaigned for public banks to reduce, by 30%, the rate of banking spread in 2009.

In 2011, FIESP initiated the campaign 'Energy at the right price', and presented in the Audit of the Union Court requesting the government to take action regarding the country's electricity prices. The federal government then granted all Brazilians the average discount of 20% in electricity costs in 2013.

In April 2013, the FIESP campaigned in the Chamber of Deputies for the approval of the Provisory Measure (MP) 595, known as the Port Law, which improves infrastructure and privatizes ports in Brazil.

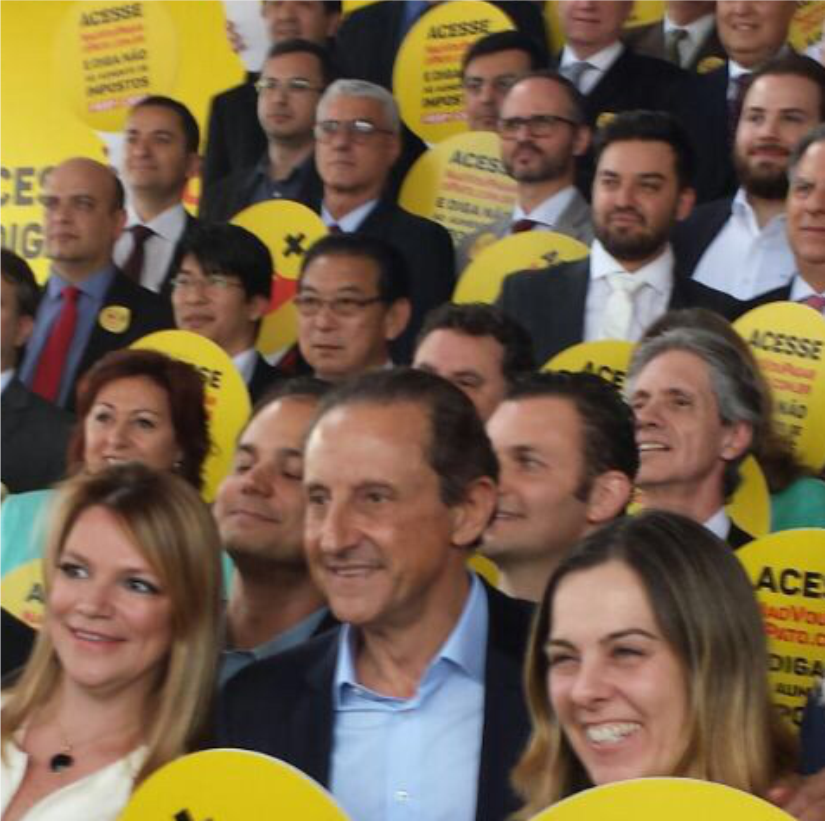
Initially campaign against CPMF, Não Vou Pagar o Pato, was one of the symbols of the protests against the government by Dilma Rousseff

The Port Law was sanctioned by President Dilma Rousseff in June of that same year.

In November of that year, FIESP also filed an unconstitutionality lawsuit against the law that approved an increase in the Urban Land and Building Tax (IPTU), with an average of 55% for households and 88% for businesses in the city of São Paulo.

The Special Institution of the São Paulo Court of Justice suspended the property tax increase in December of that year.

In June 2014, FIESP completed a partnership with the Center for Information and Coordination of Dot BR (NIC.br) and developed a software for fixed broadband monitoring. This free software confirms if internet connections comply with the contracted services.

In September 2015, FIESP started a campaign called Não Vou Pagar o Pato, against the increase in taxes and against the return of the CPMF. The CPMF was presented by the Dilma Rousseff government as the best way to recover the economy, shaken by the 2014 economic crisis. Later, FIESP started to use the duck as a symbol of the campaign for the impeachment process of the president in a context of political crisis, added to the economic crisis.

== Cultural Center FIESP Ruth Cardoso ==
FIESP finances and culturally supports the Cultural Center FIESP Ruth Cardoso. The FIESP Cultural Center was founded in March 1998 and named after the anthropologist Ruth Cardoso. The space includes the SESI Theatre, the SESI-SP Art Gallery and the Mezanino Area. The Cultural Center presents theatrical performances, exhibitions, concerts, film screenings and lectures.

FIESP sponsored the musical The Drunk Godmother, directed by Miguel Falabella in 2013 and 2014.

== Location ==
The FIESP's building headquarters is one of the city's major architectural landmarks and one of the main attractions on Paulista Avenue due to its pyramid shape. The building is 325 feet high and is one of the largest buildings on the Avenue. The building was built by Rino Levi's architectural firm in 1979. In 1998, the building was redesigned by the architect Paulo Mendes da Rocha to include the construction of a cultural center on the ground floor.

- Industrial Social Services
- SENAI
