= Paulo Skaf =

Brazilian politician

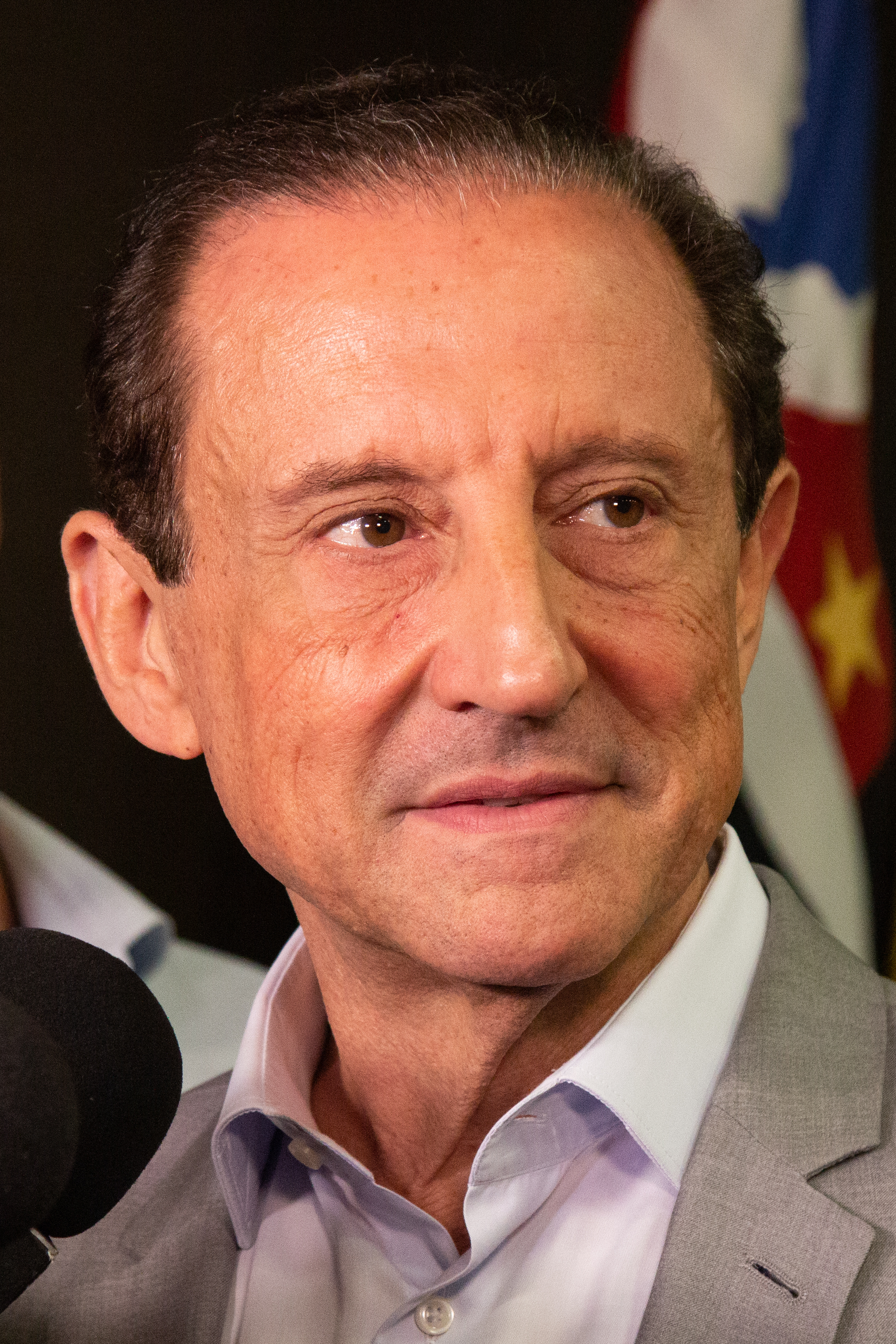
- Skaf in 2019

President of the Center of Industries of the State of São Paulo
- In office September 27, 2007 – December 31, 2021
- Preceded by: Cláudio Vaz
- Succeeded by: Rafael Cervone

President of the Federation of Industries of the State of São Paulo
- In office September 27, 2004 – December 31, 2021
- Preceded by: Horácio Lafer Piva
- Succeeded by: Josué Gomes

Personal details
- Born: Paulo Antônio Skaf; August 7, 1955 (age 71) São Paulo, São Paulo, Brazil
- Party: Republicanos (2022–present)
- Other political affiliations: PSB (2009–11); MDB (2011–22)
- Spouse: Luzia Pamplona (m. 1978)
- Children: 5
- Profession: Businessman, politician

Paulo Antônio Skaf (born August 7, 1955) is a Brazilian entrepreneur and politician, who previously served as President of the Federation of Industries of the State of São Paulo (FIESP) and the President of the Center of Industries of the State of São Paulo (CIESP), both industrial interest groups and corporate trade unions. Skaf primarily works in real estate and construction.

Skaf ran for governor of São Paulo three times, each time losing in the first round to a member of the PSDB. His best showing was in 2014, when he achieved second place in the first round against Geraldo Alckmin, but won no municipalities.

Affiliated to Republicans of incumbent Governor Tarcísio de Freitas, Skaf previously was a member of the Brazilian Socialist Party and the Brazilian Democratic Movement. Both Skaf and de Freitas are noted allies of Gilberto Kassab, the former Mayor of Sao Paulo.

== Biography ==
=== Early life and education ===
Paulo Skaf was born at Vila Mariana, a neighborhood of São Paulo, son of a Lebanese immigrant and prominent textile entrepreneur Antoine Skaf and Clotilde Habeyche Skaf. His origins can be traced to the prominent Skaff family, in which Antoine and Elias are generational names. He attended the Colégio Elvira Brandão and finished his high school at Colégio Santo Américo. He studied Business Administration at Universidade Presbiteriana Mackenzie but dropped out before completion.

In his teenage years, he started working with his father, but soon decided to become independent. Dedicated in textile, his mid-sized factories were located at the east side of São Paulo – one at Ipiranga, another at Mooca and one at Belenzinho. In order to consolidate all in one unit, years later, it was relocated to Pindamonhangaba, at Vale do Paraíba.

The arrival of the Koreans in Brazil and the downfall of his company's products competitivity caused him to feel the necessity of a drastic measure and redirection of his business. He then focused his investments to the industrial construction sector. After his activities in the real estate business, he decided to become a politician.

== Business career ==
Alongside his business interests, Skaf is known for his roles in the textile sector, at the Sindicato das Indústrias de Fiação e Tecelagem do Estado de São Paulo (Sinditêxtil) and the Associação Brasileira da Indústria Têxtil e de Confecção. As a leader for two mandates, he developed the organizations into an important part in the fashion industry. On September 27, 2004, he was elected, in his first mandate, as the President at Federação das Indústrias do Estado de São Paulo, at Ciesp, at Sesi-SP, at Senai-SP, and for the Instituto Roberto Simonsen (IRS).

At FIESP, his management focused on research into Brazil's sustainable growth. The aim was to seek structural changes to provide better public services to society, mainly at education, health, and security. As the head of the institution, Skaf innovated with the implementation of full time education and articulated the integration between high school and technical school. Nowadays, Sesi-SP is the major institution of private school in the country. In 2013, the number of enrollment at Senai-SP surpassed 1.2 Million and 150 thousand at Sesi-SP.

Skaf also actively worked on tax exemption, debureaucratization of processes, increasing the investments of infrastructure, and expanding external markets. He created an “entrepreneurial diplomacy” policy, which helped in the formation of qualified human resources to operate in private sector with international matters and micro and small businesses acting in the external Market, decisively contributing in the international insertion of Brazil.

Skaf also made an action against the CPMF (tax applied in financial transaction). This taxation was implemented in 1997 and abolished in 2007 after a fierce dispute in the Senate. In São Paulo, Skaf demanded that the matter was discussed in the specialized sector. On December 13, 2007, Skaf was able to celebrate the end of CPMF as the Senate declared its end from December 31 of the same year and preventing its reestablishment in 2008. An official notice from FIESP on behalf of Skaf declared a “victory of Brasil”.

It was also under his management in which FIESP led a campaign for two achievements: the creation of the General law for micro and small businesses and dismissing of taxes over products derived from wheat, which led to a decrease in price of bread and pasta.

In 2009, one of the most successful actions of Paulo Skaf was the decrease of 30% over spreads, easing the obtainment of bank credit, therefore, generating employment and production. Another highlight was the leadership at FIESP, defending the receipt, from exporters, of credits related to the legal reimbursement of IPI provided at external sales.

In 2011, the campaign Energia a Preço Justo (Fair price for energy), with the aim to mobilize the population against the renovation without bidding from overdue energy companies, began. The result was a discount of 20% in the energy bills of Brazilians, announced by Brazilian government in 2013. This campaign was able to generate an economy of 30 billion per year.

From June 2011 to April 2012, the FIESP promoted a strong mobilization towards the provisional measure to put an end to the port war, resolution nº 72, and that it should be approved by the senate. This measure proposed the annulment of tax breaks over imported products via discount over the Imposto sobre Circulação de Mercadoria e Serviços (ICMS) putting an end to the so-called port war.

Another important achievement for the industry was the dismiss of payroll. After two years of fighting, it was enacted in 2013 the law that deprives taxation of social security contributions of employers in certain sectors, calculated over the payroll, which creates less pressure on the costs of those who produce and more jobs for those who work.

In 2013, FIESP campaigned for the approval of the provisional measure of the Ports, which provides for the modernization of port facilities, stimulating competition and moving lower priced cargoes.

Also in 2013, FIESP and CIESP were able to stop the IPTU's increase of an average of 55% in the residences and 88% in the commerce in the city of São Paulo, which was well above the readjustment of the workers in the period, with a preliminary injunction in justice. Thus, the city of São Paulo was only able to correct the IPTU for annual inflation.

== Political career ==
Skaf's political career dates back to the 1970s, when, as a young man, he decided to join CPOR. "My vocation has always been to serve Brazil." He once said in an interview. In addition to the business, Skaf was distinguished by his leadership as a leader of entities in the sector, such as the Sinditêxtil and the Associação Brasileira da Indústria Têxtil e de Confecção (ABIT).

On September 27, 2004, he assumed the Presidency of the Federation of Industries of the State of São Paulo (Fiesp). He also took over Ciesp, Sesi-SP, Senai-SP and Instituto Roberto Simonsen (IRS), as well as being the first vice-president of CNI. He was also a member of the Conselho de Desenvolvimento Econômico e Social (CDES - Economic and Social Development Council) of the Presidency.

At Fiesp, his management adopted measures such as the implementation of full-time education and the articulation of secondary education with the technician. This year, Sesi is the largest private education network in the country. In 2009, 1.2 million enrollments were registered in Senai-SP and 120 thousand in regular Sesi-SP education. Aside from this, Skaf also worked to tax exemptions, to debureaucratize processes, to increase investments in infrastructure, to expand foreign markets (created the "Business Diplomacy").

On September 30, 2009, Skaf joined the PSB, and in the 2010 elections, he received the PSB nomination for São Paulo governorship. Despite the socialist label, Skaf presented neoliberal proposals such as the collection of tuition fees in state public universities. He was ranked 4th with 1,038,430 votes (4.56% of the valid votes), behind Geraldo Alckmin (PSDB) - 1st place and elected in the first round with 11,519,314 votes (50.63% of the valid votes) Of Aloizio Mercadante (PT) - 2nd place with 8.016.866 votes (35.23% of valid votes) - and Celso Russomano (PP) - 3rd place with 1,233,897 votes (5.42% of valid votes).

After invitation from Michel Temer, Skaf left the PSB in early 2011 and joined PMDB in São Paulo. Skaf was again a candidate for the government of São Paulo in 2014, now by the PMDB, obtaining the 2nd place with 4,594,708 votes (21.53% of the valid ones) - behind only the candidate for re-election Geraldo Alckmin (PSDB), who obtained 12,230,807 Votes (57.31% of the valid ones.

== Personal life ==
In 1978, he met Luzia Helena Pamplona de Menezes, who had arrived the same year. They have five sons, Paulo, André, Raphael, Gabriel, and Antoine, and three grandchildren.

== Honors ==
Skaf has already received medals, commendations and decorations, such as:

List of Honors of Paulo Antônio Skaf
Award	Presenter	Body
Order of Rio Branco	President of Brazil	Federative Republic of Brazil
Order of Military Merit	Brazilian Army	Federative Republic of Brazil
Order of Naval Merit	Brazilian Navy	Federative Republic of Brazil
Order of Aeronautical Merit	Brazilian Air Force	Federative Republic of Brazil
Order for Merit for Distinguished Services	President of Peru	Republic of Peru
National Order of Merit	President of Colombia	Republic of Colombia
Medal of Judicial Merit	State Court of Justice of São Paulo	State of São Paulo
Anhanguera Order of Merit	Government of the State of Goiás	State of Goiás

== See also ==
- FIESP
- CIESP
- SESI
- SENAI

Trade union offices
Preceded by Horácio Lafer Piva	President of the Federal of Industries of the State of São Paulo; 2004–2022	Succeeded by Josué Gomes
Preceded by Cláudio Vaz	President of the Center of Industries of the State of São Paulo; 2007–2022	Succeeded by Rafael Cervone
