= SKAF (automobile) =

Overview
- Manufacturer: SKAF
- Production: 1923–1924
- Assembly: Warsaw, Poland
- Designer: Stefan Kozłowski; Antoni Frączkowski

Body and chassis
- Body style: 2-seat automobile

Powertrain
- Engine: single-cylinder engine

Dimensions
- Wheelbase: 2200 mm
- Curb weight: 300 kg

SKAF (also spelled as S.K.A.F.) was a prototype automobile designed by engineers Stefan Kozłowski and Antoni Frączkowski. Its creators established the SKAF car manufacturing company in 1920, based in Warsaw, Poland. Three prototypes of the car were made between 1923 and 1924. It never entered mass production. It was the first car designed and manufactured in the Second Polish Republic, since the declaration of its independence in 1918.

== History ==
In 1920, engineers Stefan Kozłowski and Antoni Frączkowski founded an automobile manufacturing company, with the factory located at 23 Rakowiecka Street, in Warsaw, Poland. They had designed a SKAF car, with the name coming from their initials. Between 1923 and 1924 were built three prototypes of the car, of which, two had a single-cylinder engine, and one, a two-cylinder engine. The vehicle never entered mass production. It was the first car designed and manufactured in the Second Polish Republic, since the declaration of its independence in 1918. Further history of the company remains unknown.

== Specifications ==
The car had a water-cooled single-cylinder engine with a capacity of 500 cm³, with a power of between 9 kW (12 hp) and 10.3 kW (13.8 hp). The car used 8 litres of petrol and 1 litre of oil, for 100 km. Its maximum speed was 40 km/h (24.85 mph). The car weighed 300 kg (661.4 lbs). Its wheelbase was 220 cm (86.6 in). It had a friction drive and a back axle. The car had two seats, and an open body which, was painted in either navy blue or light-grey colour.
