= Nicholas Fattoush =

Lebanese politician (born 1943)

Minister of State for Parliamentary Affairs
- In office June 2011 – February 2014
- Prime Minister: Najib Mikati

Minister of Tourism
- In office 31 October 1992 – December 1998
- Prime Minister: Rafik Hariri

Personal details
- Born: Nicholas Michel Fattoush; 1943 (age 82–83) Zahlé, Lebanon
- Party: Independent
- Education: Saint Joseph University; Aix-Marseille University
- Occupation: Lawyer

Nicholas Fattoush (born 1943) is a Lebanese lawyer and politician who served in various cabinet posts, including minister of tourism. He was also member of the Lebanese Parliament.

== Biography ==
Fattoush was born in Zahlé in 1943. He hails from a Melkite Greek Catholic family. His brother, Pierre, was a businessman who died from COVID-19 in November 2020. His other brother, Moussa, is also a businessman.

Nicholas Fattoush obtained a degree in law from Saint Joseph University in 1967 and a master's degree in law from Aix-Marseille University, France, in 1971.

Fattoush began to work as lawyer from 1970. He was a faculty member of his alma mater, Saint Joseph University. His first ministerial appointment was to the first cabinet of Rafik Hariri on 31 October 1992 when he was named as the ministry of tourism. Fattoush held the post until December 1998 in the subsequent cabinets formed by Hariri. In the 1992 elections Fattoush was also elected to the Parliament from Zahlé and won the seat in the following elections from 1996 to 2009. In June 2011 Fattoush was appointed minister of state for parliamentary affairs to the cabinet headed by Prime Minister Najib Mikati. He was among the independent members of the cabinet.

=== Views and alliances ===
Fattoush was one of the members of the Parliament who opposed the extension of President Émile Lahoud's tenure. He openly declared his opposition at the Parliament in April 2004. Fattoush is a supporter of Parliament Speaker Nabih Berri.
