= Elias Skaff =

Lebanese politician

- الياس سكاف
- Born: 11 October 1948; Zahlé, Lebanon
- Died: 10 October 2015 (aged 66)
- Education: American University of Beirut
- Occupations: Politician, MP
- Political party: Popular Bloc
- Spouse: Myriam Gebran Tawk
- Children: Joseph; Gebran
- Parent(s): Joseph Skaff; Helena Nilacos

Elias Joseph Tohme "Elie" Skaff (Arabic: الياس سكاف; born 11 October 1948 – 10 October 2015) was a Lebanese politician and leader of the Popular Bloc.

== Early years and education ==
Elias Skaff was born in Zahlé, Lebanon on 11 October 1948. He is the son of the leader and ex-minister Joseph Tohme Skaff. His mother is Helena Nilacos who is of the Greek nationality.

Elias Skaff received elementary education in Zahle and then in New Zealand. In 1965, he attended the Evangelical School in Zahle and then the International School of Choueifat – Lebanon. He graduated with a bachelor's degree in Agricultural Engineering from the American University of Beirut in 1975.

== Political career ==
Skaff was elected to the Lebanese parliament in 1992 as head of the Popular Bloc list as well as in 1996, 2000 and 2005. He was appointed minister of industry in 2003 in the government of Rafic Hariri. Then he served as the minister of agriculture in 2004 and 2005 in the Omar Karami government. He also participated in the sessions of National Dialogue in his capacity as head of the parliamentary Popular Bloc in 2006. In July 2008, Skaff was appointed agriculture minister to the cabinet of then prime minister Fouad Siniora. Skaff lost his parliamentary seat in 2009 elections.

== Personal life ==
Elias Skaff was married to Myriam Gebran Tawk and has two children: Joseph and Gebran. Elias Skaff reestablished the political newspaper Al Asr (in Arabic العصر) in 2000.
