= Council of Ministers of Lebanon =

Executive body of the Republic of Lebanon

Council of Ministers of the Lebanese Republic
- مجلس الوزراء

Overview
- Established: 1926 (Constitution of the Republic of Lebanon)
- State: Lebanese Republic
- Leader: Prime Minister of Lebanon
- Appointed by: President of Lebanon and Prime Minister of Lebanon
- Ministries: 24
- Responsible to: Chamber of Deputies
- Headquarters: Grand Serail
- Website: Official website

The Council of Ministers of Lebanon (Arabic: مجلس الوزراء اللبناني, romanized: Majlis al-wozarah al-Lubnanī) is the executive body of the Republic of Lebanon. Its president is the Prime Minister of Lebanon. All Ministers are appointed by a Decree of the President of the Republic, which is countersigned by the Prime Minister. The appointed government also has to pass a confidence vote in the Parliament of Lebanon.

As stipulated in Article 95 of the Lebanese constitution, there are two political requirements for the council of ministers:

1- It has to be composed of an equal number of Muslim and Christian ministers.

2- The different sects of Lebanon shall be represented in a just and equitable manner in the formation of the Cabinet.

The Council of Ministers is considered to be the "government" of Lebanon according to the Constitution.

== History ==
The body was created on 23 May 1926, when the Constitution of the state of Greater Lebanon was promulgated. From the creation of the office in 1926 to the end of the Civil War, the Constitution made little mention of the roles and duties of the office, albeit for a mention of the President to "nominate one of the ministers as Prime Ministers". Following the end of the Lebanese Civil War and the ratification of the Ta'if Accord, the responsibilities of the Council of Ministers were significantly strengthened, codified and clearly listed in the Constitution. Notably, the accord shifted the executive power from the President to the council.

== Formation of a Government ==
The council is formed by a Decree of the President of the Republic, which is countersigned by the Prime Minister. Within 30 days, the Chamber of Deputies must approve the Government through a vote of confidence, which requires a simple majority. By Article 64 of the Lebanese Constitution, it is the Prime Minister who assumes the negotiations with the Parliament for the formation of a government. By custom, the government is composed equally between Muslims and Christians - however, this is not a requirement specified in the Constitution.

=== Resignation of the Cabinet ===
According to Article 69 of the Constitution, the government is considered resigned when:

- The Prime Minister resigns or dies.
- It loses more than a third of its members, as prescribed in its original decree of formation.
- When a new president takes office.
- At the beginning of a new term of the Chamber of Deputies.
- When the Chamber of Deputies has a vote of no confidence in the Cabinet, either by the initiative of the Cabinet or the Chamber.
- The President of the Republic fires the Prime Minister.

=== Caretaker government ===
When the government is considered resigned (as per the conditions set above), or has not yet received a vote of confidence from the Chamber of Deputies, it can only operate "in the narrow sense of conducting the business".

In addition, the cabinet is a caretaker government when the term of the President of the Republic expires and the Parliament has not yet elected a new president. For example, this was the case for 2 years upon the expiration of President Michel Suleiman's term in 2014 up until the election of Michel Aoun on 31 October 2016, with Prime Minister Tammam Salam acting as its Head.

== Responsibilities and powers ==
The council is generally tasked with overseeing daily affairs, and preparing bills for the House of Deputies to vote on. The individual ministers work on their own portfolios, and only need the signature of the President and the Prime Minister for decisions concerning their individual ministry. When decisions affect the entire government, a majority of the ministers are needed. For the government to consent on so-called "basic" issues (constitutional amendments, electoral laws, dissolving parliament, war and peace, intl. treaties, state of emergency, state budget, long-term development plans, appointing first-cadre state employees, redistricting, nationality laws, personal affairs law, dismissing ministers) (Note: The "basic issues" must be specified in the decree of formation of the government to be considered basic issues.) a 2/3 majority of the ministers present is needed.

The following is a list of the powers of the Council of Ministers:

- Forming bills for the legislature to vote on. It elaborates the public agenda, and takes the necessary decisions for the implementation of the bills adopted by the House of Deputies.
- Acquiesce on the decision of the President to dissolve the Parliament.
- Consent on the President's ratification of international treaties.
- Approve the dismissal of a minister by the President.
- Oversee all civil, military, and security administrations.
- It is the power to which the Armed Forces are subjected (however, the President is the commander-in-chief and thus has the final say).

=== Powers in relation to the President ===
Prior to the Ta'if Accord, the role of Council was to give the President its "favourable advice" rather than a clear consensus/majority on the issues prescribed above. Nevertheless, as the president is the sole person who can nominate/remove the ministers and the entire government, it is bound to be favorable to him or her. In addition, the Constitution is silent on the issue of retaliation - where if the President has the authority to fire the government and sign a decree it did not approve of - however this issue has never arisen since the Cabinet generally deferential to the President (or vice versa).

== Meetings and quorum ==
The President of the Council of Ministers is the Prime Minister. He heads the meetings and calls ordinary meetings. Whenever the president attends, however, he chairs the meetings (but without voting on its decisions). In addition, the President can place any item he deems to be "urgent" on the agenda and order extraordinary sessions.

The quorum for a meeting is 2/3 of the ministers, and its decisions are taken by those present (voting by proxy is not allowed).

=== Sectarian representation controversies ===
There have been several controversies relating to sectarian groups and the power to topple the government. For example, in 2006, Hezbollah began mass demonstrations as all 5 Shiite ministers and 1 Christian minister resigned from the 24 member cabinet (2 short of the 1/3 needed to bring down the government) of Prime Minister Fouad Siniora. This meant that there was effectively no Shiite representation in the Cabinet and a Christian majority. Nevertheless, the government continued to function for another 2 years until incumbent President Emile Lahoud's term ended in 2008.

== Cabinet of February 2025 ==
Lebanese Government of February 2025
Portfolio (ministry)	Minister	Political affiliation	Religious affiliation
Prime Minister Shares (9/24)
Prime Minister	Nawaf Salam	Independent	Sunni
Deputy Prime Minister	Tarek Mitri	Independent	Greek Orthodox
Minister of Interior and Municipalities	Ahmad al-Hajjar	Independent	Sunni
Minister of Education and Higher Learning	Rima Karami	Independent	Sunni
Minister of Economy and Trade	Amer Bisat	Independent	Sunni
Minister of Social Affairs	Hanin Sayyed	Independent	Sunni
Minister of Culture	Ghassan Salame	Independent	Greek Catholic
Minister of Tourism	Laura Khazen Lahoud	Independent	Maronite
Minister of Administrative Development	Fadi Makki	Independent	Shia
Presidential Share (3/24)
Minister of Defense	Michel Menassa	Independent	Greek Orthodox
Minister of Information	Paul Morcos	Independent	Greek Catholic
Minister of Telecommunications	Charles el-Hajj	Lebanese Forces	Maronite
Strong Republic Bloc Share (4/24)
Minister of Foreign Affairs and Emigrants	Youssef Rajji	Lebanese Forces	Maronite
Minister of Industry	Joe Issa el-Khoury	Lebanese Forces	Maronite
Minister of Energy and Water	Joe Saddi	Lebanese Forces	Greek Orthodox
Minister of Displaced	Kamal Shehadi	Lebanese Forces	Protestant
State Minister for Information Technology and Artificial Intelligence	Kamal Shehadi	Lebanese Forces	Protestant
Kataeb Bloc Share (1/24)
Minister of Justice	Adel Nassar	Kataeb Party	Maronite
Democratic Gathering Bloc Share (2/24)
Minister of Public Works and Transport	Fayez Rasamny	Progressive Socialist Party	Druze
Minister of Agriculture	Nizar Hani	Progressive Socialist Party	Druze
Development and Liberation Bloc Share (2/24)
Minister of Finance	Yassine Jaber	Amal Movement	Shia
Minister of Environment	Tamara el-Zein	Amal Movement	Shia
Loyalty to Resistance Bloc Share (2/24)
Minister of Public Health	Rakan Nasreddine	Hezbollah	Shia
Minister of Labour	Mohammad Haidar	Hezbollah	Shia
Tashnag Bloc Share (1/24)
Minister of Youth and Sports	Nora Bayrakdarian	Tashnag Party	Armenian Orthodox

== See also ==
- List of Cabinets of Lebanon
