= Cabinet of Nawaf Salam =

Government of Lebanon since 2025

- Cabinet of Lebanon

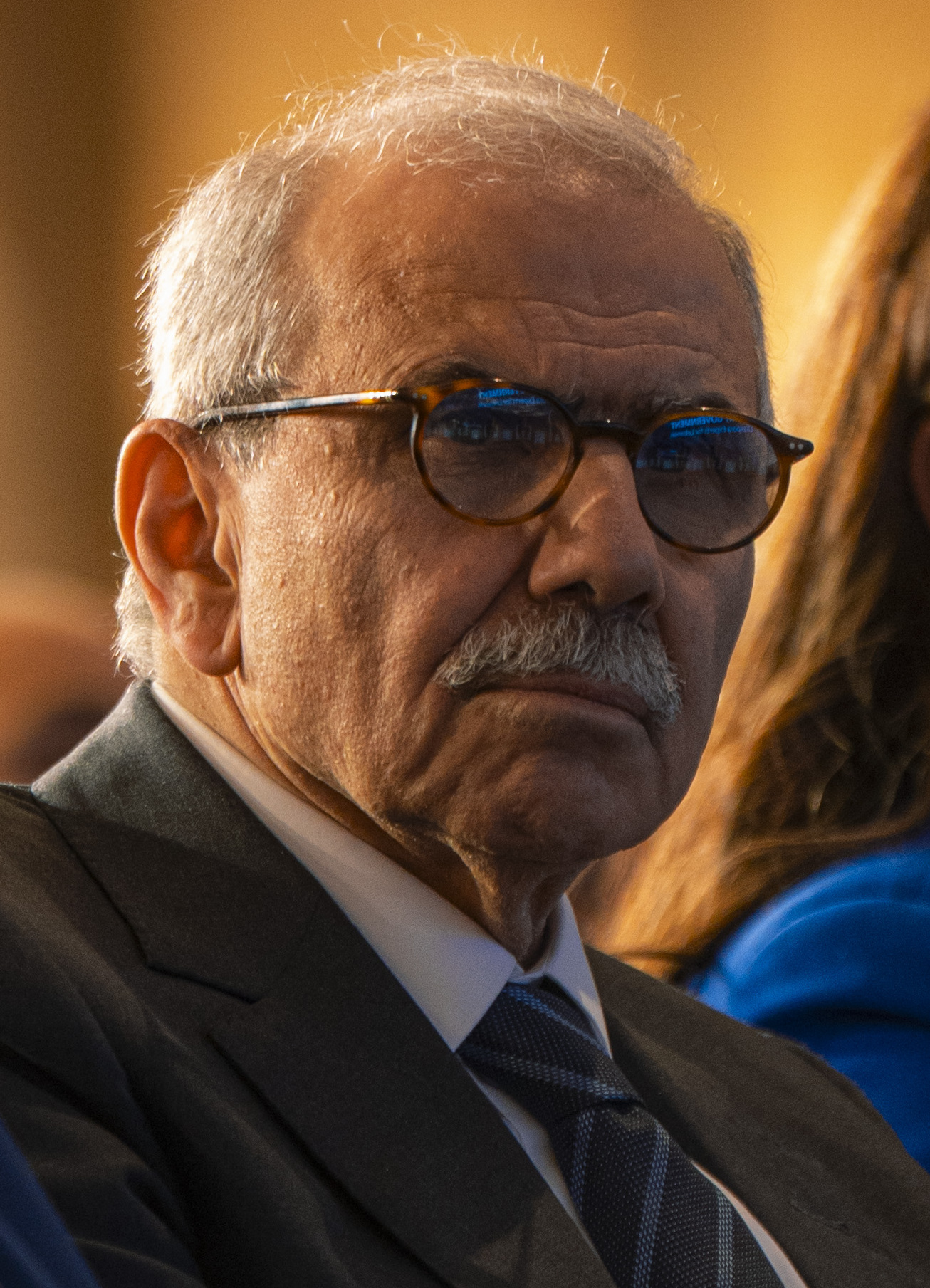
- Nawaf Salam in 2025
- Date formed: 8 February 2025

People and organisations
- President: Joseph Aoun
- Head of government: Nawaf Salam
- Deputy head of government: Tarek Mitri
- No. of ministers: 24
- Total no. of members: 24

History
- Predecessor: Mikati III

The new government of Lebanon was formed on 8 February 2025 after the election of former ICJ president Nawaf Salam as prime minister of Lebanon on 13 January. Salam's cabinet succeeded Najib Mikati's third cabinet, which had served in a caretaker capacity since May 2022.

== Election ==
In the wake of the election of Joseph Aoun as president of Lebanon on 9 January 2025, multiple opposition MPs reached a consensus on nominating Salam as Prime Minister. His candidacy is supported by many Western and Arab states, who call for his nomination, against current caretaker prime minister Najib Mikati. The Hezbollah-led alliance backed Najib Mikati to maintain his premiership. Other candidates included Fouad Makhzoumi, who initially had the backing of opposition MPs, former Interior Minister Ashraf Rifi and Beirut MP Ibrahim Mneimneh. On 13 January 2025, Salam was nominated by 84 out of 128 MPs, making him the Prime Minister-designate of Lebanon. MPs from the Lebanese Forces, the Free Patriotic Movement, the Progressive Socialist Party, the National Compatibility Bloc, Tashnag, the Renewal Bloc, Islamic Group and the opposition nominated Salam, while MPs from Hezbollah and Amal did not nominate anyone as they were last to announce their vote while Salam had an absolute majority.

Hezbollah lawmakers attempted to postpone the election as they saw the momentum building behind Salam; this was rejected by Joseph Aoun. According to a source to Reuters, Hezbollah believed a political understanding had been reached on Mikati's election before the group agreed to elect Aoun the previous week. Hezbollah's parliamentary leader Mohammad Raad stated that Hezbollah "extended its hand" by helping to secure Aoun's election only to find the "hand cut off" accusing the opposition of fragmentation and exclusion from power in Lebanon. Salam and Aoun's election is seen as a manifestation of Iran's and Hezbollah's diminished influence in Lebanese politics, partly due to Hezbollah's losses in the recent conflict with Israel and the fall of the Assad regime in Syria. On 26 February 2025, Lebanon's government of Nawaf Salam won a confidence vote in parliament.

== Composition ==
Lebanese Government of February 2025
Portfolio (ministry)	Minister	Political affiliation	Religious affiliation
Presidential Share (5/24)
Minister of Defense	Michel Menassa	Independent	Greek Orthodox
Minister of Information	Paul Morcos	Independent	Greek Catholic
Minister of Tourism	Laura Khazen Lahoud	Independent	Maronite
Minister of Telecommunications	Charles el-Hage	Independent	Maronite
State Minister of Administrative Development	Fadi Makki	Independent	Shia
Prime Minister Shares (7/24)
Prime Minister	Nawaf Salam	Independent	Sunni
Deputy Prime Minister	Tarek Mitri	Independent	Greek Orthodox
Minister of Interior and Municipalities	Ahmad al-Hajjar	Independent	Sunni
Minister of Social Affairs	Hanine Sayyed	Independent	Sunni
Minister of Education and Higher Learning	Rima Karami	Independent	Sunni
Minister of Economy and Trade	Amer Bisat	Independent	Sunni
Minister of Culture	Ghassan Salame	Independent	Greek Catholic
Strong Republic Bloc Share (4/24)
Minister of Foreign Affairs and Emigrants	Joe Raggi	Lebanese Forces	Maronite
Minister of Industry	Joe Issa el-Khoury	Lebanese Forces	Maronite
Minister of Energy and Water	Joe Saddi	Lebanese Forces	Greek Orthodox
Minister of Displaced	Kamal Shehadi	Lebanese Forces	Protestant
State Minister for Information Technology and Artificial Intelligence	Kamal Shehadi	Lebanese Forces	Protestant
Democratic Gathering Bloc Share (2/24)
Minister of Public Works and Transport	Fayez Rasamny	Progressive Socialist Party	Druze
Minister of Agriculture	Nizar Hani	Progressive Socialist Party	Druze
Kataeb Bloc Share (1/24)
Minister of Justice	Adel Nassar	Kataeb Party	Maronite
Tashnag Bloc Share (1/24)
Minister of Youth and Sports	Nora Bayrakdarian	Tashnag Party	Armenian Orthodox
Development and Liberation Bloc Share (2/24)
Minister of Finance	Yassine Jaber	Amal Movement	Shia
Minister of Environment	Tamara el-Zein	Amal Movement	Shia
Loyalty to Resistance Bloc Share (2/24)
Minister of Public Health	Rakan Nasreddine	Hezbollah	Shia
Minister of Labour	Mohammad Haidar	Hezbollah	Shia

== Major actions ==
Since established, the cabinet of Nawaf Salam is leading a path for comprehensive reforms in order to restore citizens' trust in the Lebanese state. These reforms aim to remove Lebanon from FATF's grey list, a move that will enable it to receive the financial aid it needs to reconstruct the country's economy.

=== Economic & financial reform ===
==== Banking secrecy reform ====
In April 2025 the Lebanese parliament approved a new law changing the rules on banking secrecy. It now allows certain groups, like independent auditors and financial regulators, to see banking records from the past 10 years. This is important for fighting corruption and meeting the requirements of the IMF.

==== Central bank leadership change ====
After nearly two years without a permanent central bank chief, Karim A. Souaid was appointed as governor of Banque du Liban. He stated he will help fight money laundering, restore order to the banking system and keep depositors' money safe.

==== Ban on Hezbollah linked finances ====
On July 14, 2025, Banque du Liban, had issued a circular prohibiting all licensed financial institutions from engaging in any direct or indirect dealings with Al-Qard Al-Hasan Association, Hezbollah’s Iran-backed financial arm, that is subject to U.S. sanctions.

==== IMF and World Bank engagement ====
In April 2025, a Lebanese delegation participated in the IMF–World Bank Spring Meetings in Washington, D.C., where it presented a unified reform vision aimed at addressing Lebanon's protracted financial and economic crisis. Following the meetings, Lebanon secured a $250 million loan from the World Bank to alleviate its chronic electricity shortages. The funds will be used to improve electricity bill collection and invest in solar energy projects, potentially saving $40 million annually. This initiative is part of a broader $1 billion reconstruction program, with preliminary approval to increase the loan to $400 million.

In January 2026 it was reported that the World Bank approved $350 million in new financing for Lebanon aimed at helping the country's poor and vulnerable populations, strengthening social protection systems, and supporting digital transformation of public services as part of efforts to bolster Lebanon's economic recovery. The package is split into two projects, $200 million for social safety net enhancement and $150 million for digital acceleration.

=== State authority over arms ===
==== “Homeland Shield” ====
On 5 September 2025, the cabinet led by Nawaf Salam, met to review the Lebanese army Homeland Shield Plan for weapon control presented by General Rodolphe Haykal, that focuses on the disarmament of Hezbollah. This decision has a strong international support of the U.S., Saudi Arabia and France. On 8 January 2025, the Lebanese Forces stated that they have consolidated control in southern Lebanon and are ready to proceed to Phase 2.

Army deployment and operational progress

Since the establishment of the new cabinet, The Lebanese Army has a significant presence in Southern Lebanon, and has according to reports, dismantled more than 500 Hezbollah sites.

=== 2026 budget ===
On 22 September 2025 the Lebanese cabinet approved the 2026 budget. It is considered a major step in the economic reforms Lebanon going through. The budget key points are to achieve zero deficit, boost tax compliance, and improve revenues. The new budget does not impose new taxes, but will increase enforcement on the existing ones.

=== 2026 Election ===
On 2 October 2025, it was reported that for the upcoming 2026 elections, the Lebanon's Foreign Ministry had launched a new online platform, for Lebanese diaspora to use for registration and then voting.

=== War on drugs ===
Since established the Lebanese government increased its efforts to dismantle drug networks, one of Hezbollah's finance networks, achieving success with several raids. Authorities have exposed a smuggling network planning to export 6.5 million Captagon pills and around 720 kg of hashish to Saudi Arabia, they arrested the leader and his associates. In one of the country's biggest bust, they conducted a raid in Baalbek, where the army seized 64 million Captagon pills, precursor chemicals, and drug‐manufacturing machinery. Lebanese forces collaborated with regional forces to find and destroy a Captagon drug factory in the Bekaa Valley, based on intel from Iraq and used joint intelligence centers with Syria, Jordan, and Iraq.

=== 2026 Hezbollah-Israel conflict ===
Following the 2026 Iran war, Hezbollah launched attacks on Israel on March 2, causing Israel to increase its ongoing aggression (continuous violations of the Lebanese sovereignty and bombing of civilians, houses and infrastructure, thus not respecting the 2025 ceasefire). The Lebanese government for the first time in history announced its decision to ban Hezbollah's military and security activities, naming them illegal. According to the governments law, the state is the only one legally allowed to make decisions regarding war and peace, requiring Hezbollah to turn over it weapons to the government.

In an interview to Asharq Al-Awsat, Salam said:

We could have avoided being impacted by the conflict were it not for the strategic error committed by Hezbollah by being dragged us into it

— Thaer Abbas, Salam to Asharq Al-Awsat: We Refuse to Tie Lebanon's Fate to Iran's Interests,

=== Ban of IRGC ===
On 5 March 2026, it was announced that all activity of the Iranian IRGC in Lebanon is banned. In addition, it was decided that Iranians now require a visa to enter Lebanon.

=== Possible legal action against Naim Qassem ===
On 7 March 2026 it was reported that Adel Nassar, the Minister of Justice is considering to take legal action against Hezbollah Secretary General Sheikh Naim Qassem. According to reports this comes in response to controversial remarks by Qassem that accused the Lebanese government of carrying out Israeli orders.

=== Media ===
Minister of Information, Paul Morcos, issued an order on 16 March 2026 to all media outlets in Lebanon (television, radio and the national news agency) to stop using the word – "resistance" affiliated to Hezbollah, meaning they are not to call them by that name anymore.

=== Declaration of Iranian ambassador as Persona Non Grata ===
On March 24, 2026, the Lebanese government declared the Iranian ambassador Mohammad Reza Raouf Sheibani, as Persona Non Grata, withdrawing its approval of his accreditation. This decision came following what the Lebanese government called "Tehran's violation of diplomatic norms and established practices between the two countries", and its accusations against Hezbollah dragging Lebanon in to war.

== Syrian refugees ==
In mid January 2026, it was reported by Haneen Sayed the more than 500,000 Syrian refugees have left Lebanon safely, returning to their homes in Syria. He stated the government will continue doing so throughout 2026.

== See also ==
- Disarmament of Hezbollah
