= Markabta =

Village in Miniyeh-Danniyeh District, Lebanon

Markabta (Arabic: مركبتا) is a village in the Miniyeh-Danniyeh District, in the North Governorate of Lebanon.The population, according to regulations issued by the Ministry of Interior and Municipalities, is about 6 thousand people, including 2,500 people from the village and the rest from Minieh and Syrian refugees. There are also about 450 expatriates living in Sydney today.

== History ==
The town was first permanently inhabited by "Greg Al-Shami" who came from the village of Haql El Aazimeh, where his father and uncles were originally from Damascus, and that is why they were given the title of Al-Shami in reference to Damascus. Four brothers came from Damascus during the period from 1780-1790 and spread out to different Lebanese regions, including Abu "Greg Al-Shami" who lived in Haql El Aazimeh, then his son Greg came to Markabta. Greg Al-Shami married Maryam Khazami from Aassoun, who was previously married to someone from the Bishara family, so the sons of the Bishara family were raised with the sons of Greg Al-Shami, and through the marriage of relatives, the first community in the town arose, and this happened between the years 1830-1835. Then other families came after the First World War. Some researchers found Roman remains, and according to studies, the word Markabta means "crown" in ancient Syriac, and it was inhabited before the beginning of the eleventh century. The town was besieged several times during the Lebanese War, but it did not fall into the hands of any of the conflicting parties. In 2014, the town was threatened by ISIS by writing threats to the people of the town on churches and on the Minieh-Dinniyeh highway.

== Geography ==
It is at an altitude of between 200 and 250 meters above sea level and is about twenty kilometers away from the city of Tripoli, the capital of northern Lebanon, while its distance from Beirut is about 102 kilometers. The town is surrounded by a large number of orchards and fields and is located between many hills. Half of the lands surrounding the town are owned by the townspeople. The Minieh-Dennieh highway passes through the town, connecting approximately 50,000 people to approximately 80,000 from the two regions.

Surrounding villages: Kefraya, Al-Minya, Terbol, Zouk, Hanin.

== Demographics ==
In 2014, Christians made up 96.70% of registered voters in Markabta. 91.80% of the voters were Greek Orthodox. The city is affiliated with the Greek Orthodox Archdiocese of Tripoli and Koura. It is considered the backbone not only for the Orthodox, but for all Christians in the Dinniyeh-Miniya District, and it comes in first place for Christian communities in the city: Al-Dinniyeh District - Al-Minya, followed by Kfar Habou, Al-Minya, and Haql El Aazimeh.

== Local council ==
The municipality has nine members and a mayor.

The position of mayor has existed in the town for more than 90 years. The Council was elected for the first time in 2010. The number of people entitled to vote was about 1,100 people in 2016. There is a middle school and a high school. The number of teachers reaches approximately 30 and the number of students reaches 530 students. The town has a dispensary and a club.

== Notable people ==
- Saadeh Al Shami – Deputy Prime Minister of Lebanon
