= Tamara el-Zein =

Lebanese scientist and politician

- تمارا الزين

Minister of Environment
- Incumbent
- Assumed office 8 February 2025
- President: Joseph Aoun
- Prime Minister: Nawaf Salam

Personal details
- Born: 1977 (age 48–49) Lebanon
- Party: Amal Movement (reported)
- Occupation: Scientist, academic, politician

Tamara el-Zein (Arabic: تمارا الزين; born 1977) is a Lebanese physical chemist, academic and politician who has served as Minister of Environment since 8 February 2025 in the government of Prime Minister Nawaf Salam. She was previously Secretary-General of the National Council for Scientific Research (CNRS-L), becoming the first woman to lead the institution.

== Early life and education ==
El-Zein earned a PhD in physical chemistry from the University of Haute-Alsace in 2002, where she later served as Maître de conférences (lecturer).

== Scientific and academic career ==
In 2013, El-Zein joined the Lebanese Atomic Energy Commission at CNRS-L, establishing a research unit focused on innovative materials for radioactive decontamination. She later became Research Director and headed CNRS-L's national doctoral fellowships programme; since 2016 she has been a member of the AUF International Scientific Board.

With support from UNESCO, she helped establish in 2019 the National Observatory for Women in Research (DAWReK'n), which she heads, to promote women's participation in research in Lebanon.

== Political career ==
On 8 February 2025, El-Zein was appointed Minister of Environment in the government of Prime Minister Nawaf Salam. Media profiles noted she was the first woman to serve in the portfolio and highlighted her prior role as CNRS-L Secretary-General.

In August 2025, during a 100-day review, she outlined initiatives on structural reform, digital transformation, and green public procurement at the ministry. She has also commented publicly on forthcoming cabinet discussions related to national security and governance matters.

== Honours and recognition ==
- L’Oréal–UNESCO For Women in Science (Levant–Egypt fellowship, 2016; International Rising Talent, 2017).
- Chevalier of the Ordre des Palmes académiques (2020).
- Listed among "Lebanese women pioneers" by the National Initiative of the Centenary of Greater Lebanon.
