= Third cabinet of Najib Mikati =

Government of Lebanon from 2021 to 2025

Third Cabinet of Najib Mikati
- Cabinet of Lebanon

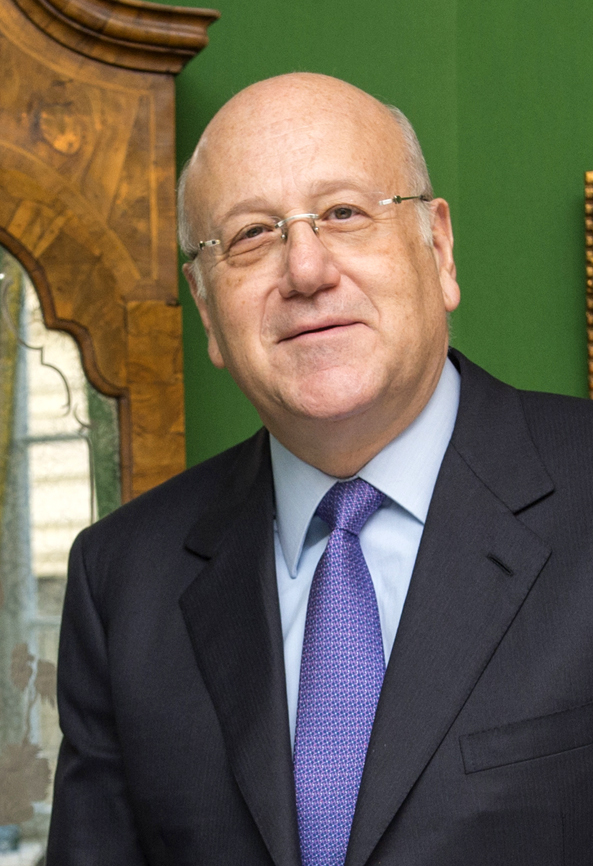
- Najib Mikati
- Date formed: 10 September 2021
- Date dissolved: 8 February 2025

People and organisations
- President: Michel Aoun; Joseph Aoun
- Head of government: Najib Mikati
- Deputy head of government: Saadeh Al Shami
- No. of ministers: 24
- Ministers removed: George Kurdahi resigned
- Total no. of members: 24

History
- Predecessor: Cabinet of Hassan Diab
- Successor: Cabinet of Nawaf Salam

On 10 September 2021, a new government headed by Najib Mikati was formed in Lebanon, 13 months after the resignation of former Prime Minister Hassan Diab in August 2020. The cabinet was composed of 24 ministers.

== Composition ==
Lebanese Government of September 2021
Portfolio (ministry)	Minister	Political affiliation	Religious affiliation
Prime Minister Shares (5/24)
Prime Minister	Najib Mikati	Azm Movement	Sunni
Minister of Economy and Trade	Amin Salam	Azm Movement	Sunni
Minister of Interior and Municipalities	Bassam Mawlawi	Azm Movement	Sunni
Minister of Public Health	Firas Abiad	Future Movement	Sunni
Minister of the Environment	Nasser Yassine	Future Movement	Sunni
President Michel Aoun and Strong Lebanon Bloc Shares (9/24)
Minister of Foreign Affairs	Abdallah Bou Habib	Free Patriotic Movement	Maronite
Minister of Justice	Henri Khoury	Free Patriotic Movement	Maronite
Minister of Tourism	Walid Nassar	Free Patriotic Movement	Maronite
Minister of Energy and Water	Walid Fayyad	Free Patriotic Movement	Greek Orthodox
Minister of Defense	Maurice Sleem	Free Patriotic Movement	Greek Orthodox
State Minister for Social Affairs	Hector Hajjar	Free Patriotic Movement	Greek Catholic
Minister of Industry	George Bouchikian	Tashnag Party	Armenian Orthodox
Minister of Displaced	Issam Charafeddine	Lebanese Democratic Party	Druze
Amal Movement (3/24)
Minister of Finance	Youssef Khalil	Amal Movement	Shia
Minister of Agriculture	Abbas Hajj Hassan	Amal Movement	Shia
Minister of Culture	Mohammad Mortada	Amal Movement	Shia
Loyalty to Resistance Bloc (Hezbollah) (2/24)
Minister of Public Works	Ali Hamiyeh	Hezbollah	Shia
Minister of Labour	Mustafa Bairam	Hezbollah	Shia
National Coalition (2/24)
Minister of Telecommunications	Johnny Korm	Marada Movement	Maronite
Minister of Information	Ziad Makary	Marada Movement	Maronite
Others (3/24)
Deputy Prime Minister	Saadeh Al Shami	Syrian Social Nationalist Party in Lebanon	Greek Orthodox
Minister of Education and Higher Learning	Abbas Halabi	Progressive Socialist Party	Druze
Minister of Youth and Sport	George Kalass	Independent	Greek Catholic
State Minister for Administrative Reform	Najla Riachi	Independent	Latin Catholic

== Resignations ==
George Kurdahi, Minister of information, announced his resignation on 3 December 2021, weeks after his criticism on the Yemeni War. As a result, Saudi, Emirati, Kuwaiti and Yemeni diplomats withdrew from Lebanon, and the Lebanese ambassadors in Saudi Arabia, Kuwait and Bahrain were expelled.

== Aoun dispute and dissolution ==
President Michel Aoun signed the government's resignation decree, a day before his six-year term officially ends, and Former Prime Minister Najib Mikati's government remained in office in a caretaker capacity until the formation of Nawaf Salam's government on the 8th of February 2025.
