= Tarek Mitri =

Lebanese statesman and professor

- طارق متري
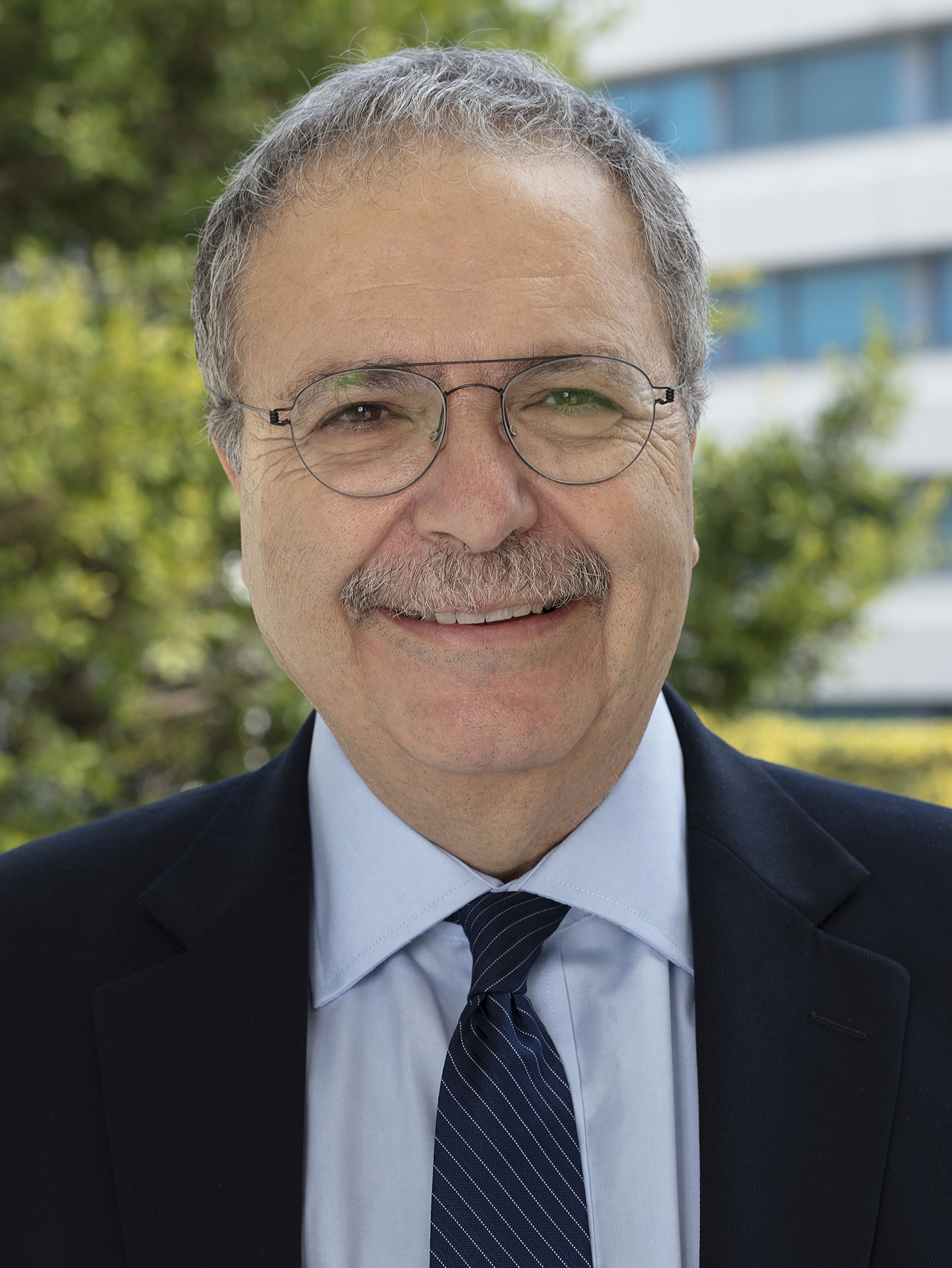
- Mitri in 2019

28th Deputy Prime Minister of Lebanon
- Incumbent
- Assumed office 8 February 2025
- Prime Minister: Nawaf Salam
- Preceded by: Saadeh Al Shami

Minister of Culture
- In office 19 July 2005 – 11 July 2008
- Prime Minister: Fouad Siniora
- Preceded by: Assad Rizk
- Succeeded by: Tammam Salam

Personal details
- Born: 16 September 1950 (age 76) Tripoli, Lebanon
- Party: Independent
- Education: University of Paris X
- Occupation: University professor
- Cabinet: Nawaf Salam cabinet

Tarek Mitri (Arabic: طارق متري, romanized: Ṭāriq Mitrī; born 16 September 1950) is a Lebanese university professor, independent politician and former government minister who is currently serving as the deputy prime minister of Lebanon as of 8 February 2025.

== Early life and education ==
Mitri was born on 16 September 1950. He has a PhD in political science from the University of Paris X.

== Career ==
Dr. Tarek Mitri is the President of St George University of Beirut.

He was director of the Issam Fares Institute on Public Policy and International Affairs at the American University of Beirut (2014–2019).

He served as the Special Representative of the UN Secretary General (2012- 2014).

From 2005 to 2011, he was member of four successive Lebanese governments as Minister of Environment, Administrative Reform, Culture, Information and acting Minister of Foreign Affairs.

Previously, he worked in the World Council of Churches in Geneva and held various positions in ecumenical organizations, responsible of Christian-Muslim relations, intercultural and interreligious dialogue.

He taught at the Université Saint Joseph, Balamand University, the University of Geneva, Amsterdam Free University, Harvard University and the American University of Beirut.

He chairs the Boards of Nicolas Sursock Museum and the Institute of Palestine Studies. He is a board member of the Arab Center for Research and Policy Studies.

He authored a number of books and articles on contemporary Arab issues, religion and politics, interreligious and intercultural dialogue. In January 2025, Al Jadeed TV reported he is to serve as Deputy Prime Minister in the new Lebanese government.

== Views ==
Mitri states his role is more as an advocate for the intellectuals and the artists along with their freedom of expression and thought. He has also known to be a staunch advocate for Lebanese unity.

== Books ==
- The War on Lebanon, The story of UNSC Resolution 1701, Arab Center for Research, 2022
- Les chemins rudes, deux ans en Libye, Dar Riad al Rayiss, 2015.
- (تحرير، مع ساري حنفي)، الدولة العربية والقوية: المآلات بعد الإنتفاضات العربية، بيروت، الدار العربية للعلوم، 2019.
- "Madinah Ala Jabal". Dar Annahar, Beirut. 2004
- سطور مستقيمة بأحرف متعرجة: عن المسيحيين الشرقيين وعلاقتهم بالمسلمين، دار النهار، بيروت، 2007 و2014
- In Gottes Namen? Religion und Politik in den USA, Lembeck, Frankfurt am Main, 2005.
- Au nom de la Bible, au nom de l'Amérique. Labor et Fides. 2004. ISBN 978-2-8309-1138-1.
- (Ed.) Religion Law and Society, A Christian-Muslim Discussion, WCC/KOK Pharos, Geneva/Amsterdam, 1995.
- (Ed.) Religion and Human Rights, A Christian-Muslim Discussion, WCC, Geneva, 1997.

Political offices
Preceded by Saadeh Al Shami	Deputy Prime Minister of Lebanon; 2025–present	Incumbent
Preceded by Ghazi Aridi	Minister of Information; 2008–2011	Succeeded by Walid Daouk
Preceded by Fawzi Salloukh	Interim Minister of Foreign Affairs and Emigrants; 2006–2008	Succeeded by Fawzi Salloukh
Preceded by Assad Risk	Minister of Culture; 2005–2008	Succeeded by Tammam Salam
Preceded by Ibrahim Daher	Minister of Administrative Reform; 2005	Succeeded by Jean Oghassapian
Preceded by Wi'am Wahhab	Minister of Environment; 2005	Succeeded by Yacoub Sarraf
