= Kamal Shehadi =

Lebanese politician

- كمال شحادة
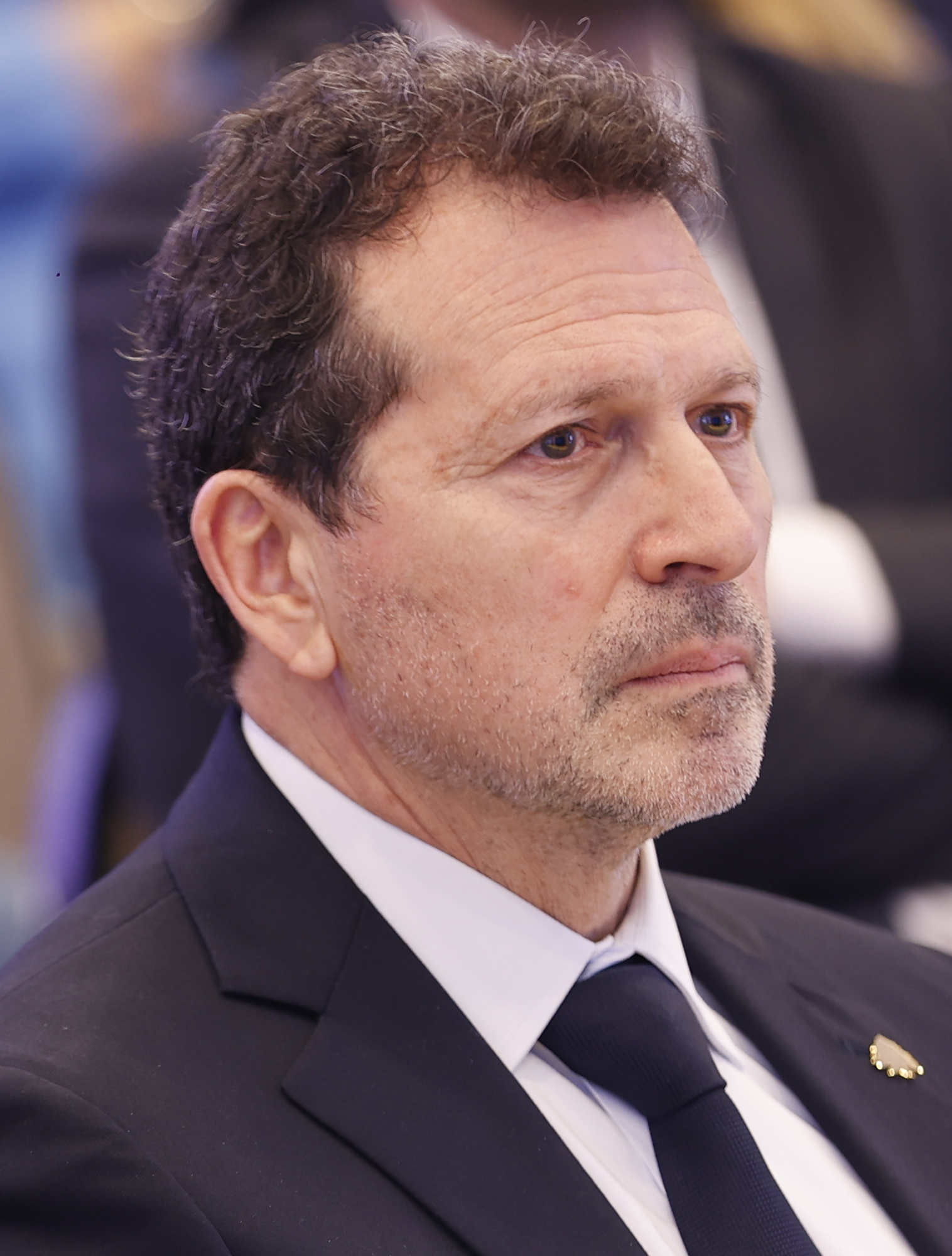
- Shehadi in 2026

Minister of State for Technology and Artificial Intelligence
- Incumbent
- Assumed office 8 February 2025
- President: Joseph Aoun
- Prime Minister: Nawaf Salam

Minister of Displaced
- Incumbent
- Assumed office 8 February 2025
- Preceded by: Issam Charafeddine

Personal details
- Party: Lebanese Forces
- Education: Columbia University; Harvard University
- Profession: Economist; politician
- Cabinet: Nawaf Salam

Kamal Shehadi (also spelled Shehadeh; Arabic: كمال شحادة) is a Lebanese economist, telecommunications executive, and politician. Since February 2025, he has served as Minister of Displaced Persons and Minister of State for Technology and Artificial Intelligence in the Lebanese government.

== Education ==
He holds a Bachelor of Arts in economics (cum laude) from Harvard College and a PhD in International Political Economy from Columbia University. He has also taught at the American University of Beirut (AUB).

== Career ==
Shehadeh began his professional career in policy research and public finance. He was director of research at the Lebanese Center for Policy Studies and held board positions with the Lebanese Transparency Association and as a founding member of the Lebanese Association for Democratic Elections. He has authored studies on Lebanon's public finances, economic reforms, and the Euro-Mediterranean Partnership.

In 2007, he was appointed chairman and CEO of Lebanon's Telecommunications Regulatory Authority (TRA), the country's first independent telecom regulator. During his tenure (2007–2010), he introduced key telecommunications regulations and oversaw the public auction process for cellular telecom licenses.

He later held senior executive roles at the UAE-based telecom and technology group e& (formerly Etisalat), was chief executive officer for Legal and Regulatory Affairs and subsequently for Strategic Affairs. He also chaired the group of CEOs for Policy and Regulation at the GSM Association (GSMA) and was Chairman of the Global Symposium for Regulators at the International Telecommunication Union (ITU).

In February 2025, Shehadi was nominated by the Lebanese Forces to the dual role of Minister of Displaced Persons and the first Minister of State for Technology and Artificial Intelligence in the government led by Prime Minister Nawaf Salam. While some reports suggested the ministry of displaced might be dissolved, Shehadeh has clarified that it remains active to resolve outstanding displacement dossiers from the Lebanese Civil War. As technology minister, he has created the LEAP initiative (Launch–Enact–Advance–Promote), a five-year national strategy for digital transformation and AI readiness and took part in signing landmark Memorandum of Understanding (MoU) between the Ministry and Oracle.

He also expressed support for the Disarmament of Hezbollah and emphasized the importance of state authority and implementation of United Nations Security Council resolutions 1559 and 1701. In April 2025, he announced that the Council of Ministers had tasked the Higher Defense Council with developing plans for the disarmament of all militias, including Hezbollah, as part of post-ceasefire efforts following the November 2024 agreement.
