= Sahar Baassiri =

Lebanese journalist

Ambassador of Lebanon to UNESCO
- Incumbent
- Assumed office January 2018

Personal details
- Born: 1960s Lebanon
- Spouse: Nawaf Salam
- Children: 2
- Education: American University of Beirut; Columbia University Graduate School of Journalism
- Occupation: Journalist • Diplomat

Sahar Baassiri, also spelled Baasiri (Arabic: سحر بعاصيري; born 1960s) is a Lebanese diplomat and journalist currently serving as Ambassador, Permanent Representative of Lebanon to UNESCO in Paris.

Ms. Baassiri worked for the leading Lebanese daily An-Nahar newspaper between 1981 and 2009. In 1993, she became the first female foreign editor at a Lebanese daily newspapers. And was the first woman in the Arab world to write a front-page column in a daily paper. She was also the United Press International (UPI), Beirut correspondent between 1989 and 1991.

She is the author of two books (in Arabic): ″Lebanon on Hold and ″The Wandering Arabs, both published in 2009 by Dar An-Nahar. Ms. Baassiri earned her BA in Political Science from the American University of Beirut and an MS in Journalism from Columbia University Graduate School of Journalism.

After the appointment of her spouse, Nawaf Salam as prime minister of Lebanon on 8 February 2025, she became Second Lady of Lebanon, serving as co-director of the National Council of Lebanese Women alongside the First Lady of Lebanon Nehmat Aoun.
