= Nehmat Aoun =

First Lady of Lebanon (2025–present)

- نعمت عون
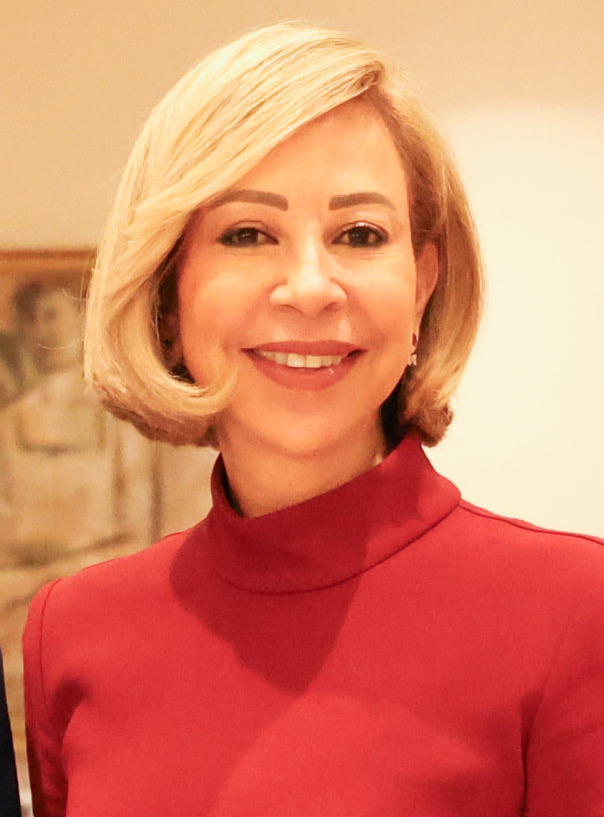
- Aoun in 2026

First Lady of Lebanon
- Incumbent
- Assumed role 9 January 2025
- President: Joseph Aoun
- Preceded by: Nadia El-Chami

Personal details
- Born: Nehmat Nehmat Shiyyah, Greater Beirut, Lebanon
- Citizenship: Lebanon
- Spouse: Joseph Aoun
- Children: 2

Nehmat Aoun (Arabic: نعمت عون), also transcribed as Neemat or Naamat, is the First Lady of Lebanon, having served as such since her husband, Joseph Aoun, was elected President of Lebanon on 9 January 2025.

== Early and personal life ==
Nehmat Aoun was born in Shiyyah, the daughter of Melhem Nehmat, who worked for Middle East Airlines. She has two sisters, Tania and Lina.

Nehmat Aoun is a mother of two: her son, Khalil, is a banker and a professional basketball player, and her daughter, Noor, works with international institutions. She has three grandchildren.

== Education ==
Nehmat Aoun attended the Saint Famille Francaise in Fanar for her Lebanese Baccalaureate and later earned her bachelor's degree in Laboratory Sciences from the Lebanese University.

== Career ==
She worked for many years in the field of public relations, including 23 years as the Head of the Protocol and Public Relations Department at the Lebanese American University.

== First Lady of Lebanon ==
Marking a departure from her predecessors and the spouses of former prime ministers and heads of parliament, who have largely stayed absent from social media, she launched her social media accounts with a direct message to the Lebanese people.

In addition to her traditional role of attending official ceremonies and commemorations, she represents the head of state on social and humanitarian issues.

As First Lady of Lebanon, she also serves as the director of the National Council of Lebanese Women, alongside the spouses of the Prime Minister of Lebanon, Sahar Baassiri and the Head of Parliament, Randa Berri.

Her platform focuses on the importance of the position of Lebanese women in society, emphasizing that their rights are protected while affirming a commitment to further preserve and strengthen these rights.

She led a delegation to New York for the 69th session of the United Nations Commission on the Status of Women.

Aoun was featured on the cover of Vogue Arabia in October 2025.
