= Laura Khazen Lahoud =

Lebanese Minister of Tourism

- لورا الخازن لحود
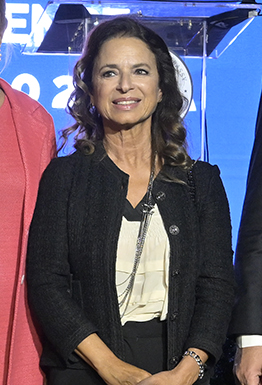
- Lahoud in 2025

Minister of Tourism
- Incumbent
- Assumed office 8 February 2025
- President: Joseph Aoun
- Prime Minister: Nawaf Salam
- Preceded by: Walid Nassar

Personal details
- Born: Lebanon
- Party: Independent
- Education: University of London
- Occupation: Business executive, Cultural advocate
- Cabinet: Nawaf Salam cabinet

Laura Khazen Lahoud is a Lebanese business executive, and cultural advocate who was appointed Lebanon's Minister of Tourism in February 2025 in the government of Prime Minister Nawaf Salam.

== Education ==
Lahoud holds a Bachelor's degree in Mathematics from the University of London and a Master's degree in Mathematics and Operational Research from the London School of Economics and Political Science.

== Career ==
=== Business and finance ===
Lahoud has held several leadership positions in business and finance, including:

- Executive Vice President of the Al Bustan International Festival
- Board Member at C.A.T. Group (2020–present)
- Director at Hotel Al Bustan

=== Hospitality and cultural work ===
Lahoud has played a significant role in Lebanon's cultural and hospitality sectors. She has been the managing director of Al Bustan Hotel & Spa since 2016 and serves as the Executive Vice President of the Al Bustan International Festival, an annual event celebrating classical music and artistic performances in Lebanon. She works closely with her mother, Myrna Bustani, the founder of the festival.

=== Political career ===
In February 2025, Lahoud was appointed Lebanon's Minister of Tourism. Her appointment was part of a broader shift in Lebanese politics, with the new government including five women in key ministerial positions. Her background in mathematics, business, and cultural advocacy is seen as bringing a unique perspective to her role in tourism development.

== Personal life ==
Laura Khazen Lahoud is the daughter of Fouad El Khazen and Myrna Bustani who was the first woman elected to the Lebanese Parliament, and the granddaughter of pioneer, entrepreneur, and politician Emile Bustani.

She is married to Samir Lahoud, chairman of Lahoud Engineering Co. He is the son of Lebanese political figure Salim Lahoud and the brother of Nassib Lahoud, a prominent Lebanese politician.

== See also ==
- Politics of Lebanon
- Tourism in Lebanon
- Cabinet of Nawaf Salam
- Khazen Family
- Lahoud Family
