= Joe Saddi =

Lebanese businessman and consultant

- جو صدي
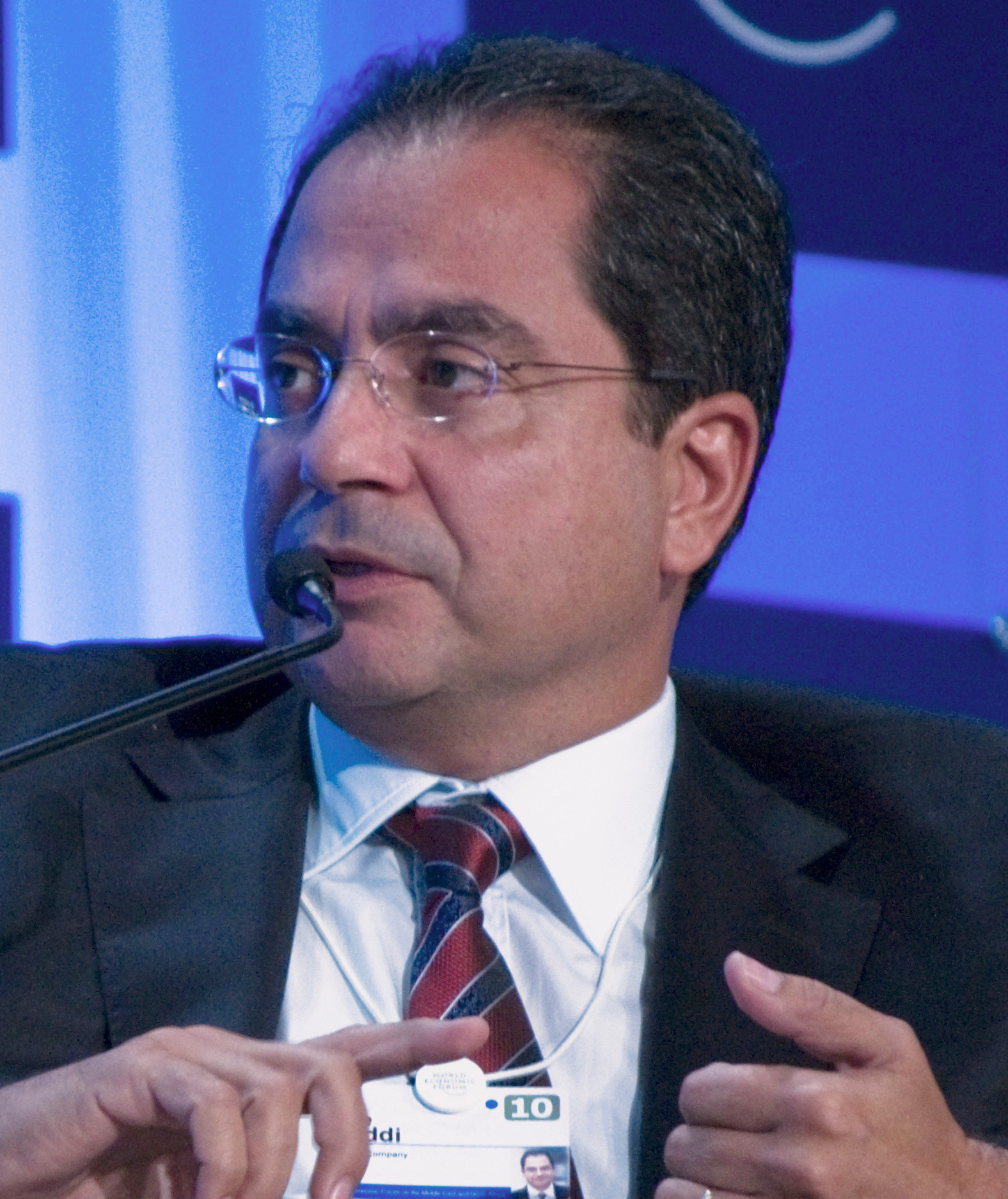
- Saddi in 2012

Minister of Energy and Water
- Incumbent
- Assumed office 8 February 2025
- Prime Minister: Nawaf Salam
- Preceded by: Walid Fayad

Personal details
- Born: 1959 (age 66–67)
- Education: ESSEC Business School; Cornell University

Joseph Saddi (Arabic: جو صدي) is a Lebanese businessman and consultant who was based in the United Arab Emirates leading privatization efforts in the energy, mining, and steel sectors. He is currently the Minister of Energy and Water in the Cabinet of Nawaf Salam since February 8, 2025.

== Early life and education ==
Saddi was born into a Lebanese Greek Orthodox family. He earned a bachelor's degree from the ESSEC Business School in Paris and then an MBA from Cornell University.

== Career ==
Joe Saddi served as the global chairman of Booz & Company and managing director of its Middle East business. He is currently a senior executive advisor at Strategy&, part of the PwC network, where he has led major privatization programs in sectors like oil and gas, mining, steel, and electricity. He has also advised Middle East governments on sector deregulation and policy.

During Saad Hariri's attempt in forming a government in July 2021, he proposed Saddi's name as Deputy Prime Minister of Lebanon which is reserved for Orthodox Christians. However, formation failed and Hariri resigned from his designation. On February 8, he was appointed Minister of Energy and Water of Lebanon by Nawaf Salam after being suggested by the Lebanese Forces party. It marked the first time in years that the energy minister was not named by the Free Patriotic Movement, a rival Christian party once close to Hezbollah before relations broke.
