= Manal Abdel Samad =

Lebanese politician (born 1975)

- منال عبد الصمد

Minister of Information
- In office 21 January 2020 – 10 September 2021
- Prime Minister: Hassan Diab
- Preceded by: Jamal Jarrah
- Succeeded by: George Kurdahi

Personal details
- Born: 28 March 1975 (age 51) Ammatour, Lebanon
- Party: Independent
- Education: American University of Beirut; University of Paris 1 Pantheon-Sorbonne

Manal Abdel Samad (Arabic: منال عبد الصمد; 28 March 1975) is a Lebanese politician who held the position of the Minister of Information in the Cabinet of the Prime Minister Hassan Diab in the year 2020.

== Education ==
From the year 2004 until the year 2009, Manal Abdel Samad studied fiscal laws at the American University of Beirut (AUB), from where she also received her MBA. Then, she pursued her studies to obtain her Ph.D from the Sorbonne University in France, Paris in 2014.

== Professional career ==
In the year 1997, Manal Abdel Samad began her service in the Lebanese Ministry of Finance, in which she was involved in the implementation of a Value-added Tax (VAT) in Lebanon. A few years later, she was promoted to the Head of the Department of Tax Legislation and Policy at the Directorate of VAT. Additionally, she was a lecturer at both the Saint Joseph University (USJ) and the American University of Beirut (AUB).

== Political career ==
In January 2020, she became the Minister of Information, after being proposed by the Prime Minister Dr. Hassan Diab as an independent candidate. She was one of the six female ministers out of a total of 20 ministers in the Diab Government, an event that was regarded as a step in the right direction towards achieving gender equality in Lebanese politics. In relation of the spark of the Coronavirus disease pandemic, many conspiracy theories started to circulate in the country, which she quickly addressed and countered by announcing a cooperation with World Health Organization (WHO), UNICEF and the United Nations Development Programme. Then, Manal Abdel Samad resigned her position on the 9th of August 2020, following the explosions in the port of Beirut which took place on August 4, 2020. The next day, Dr. Hassan Diab announced the resignation of the government, and Manal Abdel Samad had been fulfilling the duties of the minister as a caretaker until a new successor is found.

== Personal life ==
Manal Abdel-Samad was born on 28 March 1975. She is married to Youssef Najd and has three children with him: Carole, Rayan and Rami-Jo. She is fluent in Arabic, English, and French. Manal Abdel-Samad is a Druze.
