= Abbas Halabi =

Lebanese politician (born 1948)

- عباس حلبي
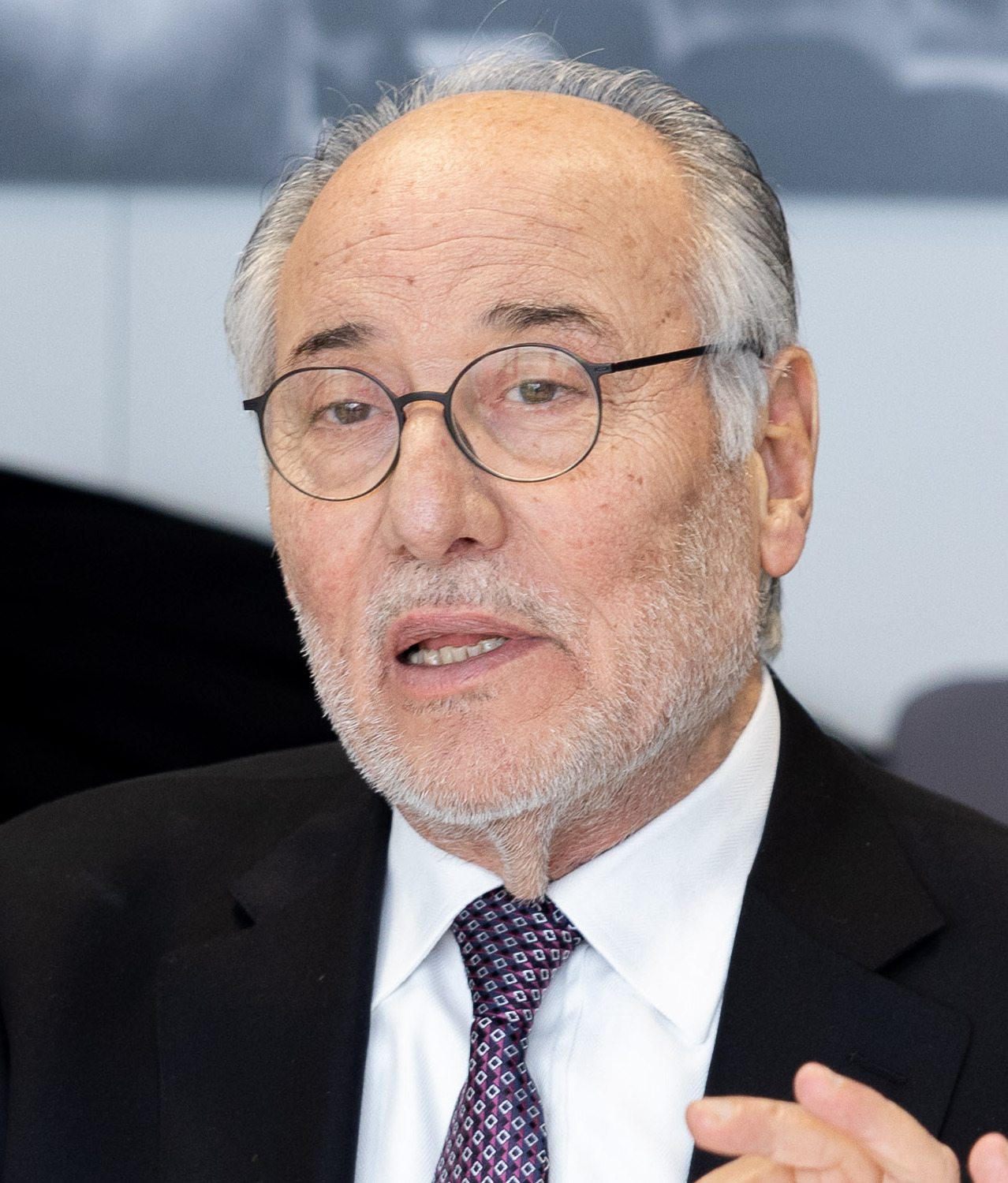
- Abbas Halabi in 2023

Minister of Information
- In office Ad interim 3 December 2021 – 10 March 2022
- President: Michel Aoun
- Prime Minister: Najib Mikati
- Preceded by: George Kordahi
- Succeeded by: Ziad Makary

Minister of Education and Higher Learning
- In office 10 September 2021 – 8 February 2025
- President: Michel Aoun; Najib Mikati (acting); Joseph Aoun
- Prime Minister: Najib Mikati
- Preceded by: Tarek Majzoub
- Succeeded by: Rima Karami

Personal details
- Born: 1948 (age 77–78)
- Party: Progressive Socialist Party
- Education: Saint Joseph University; European University Institute
- Cabinet: Third Najib Mikati cabinet

Abbas Salim al-Halabi (Arabic: عباس حلبي; born 1948) is a Lebanese politician who served as Minister of Education in the Third Cabinet of Najib Mikati.

== Education ==
Abbas Slim is from Ras El-Matn in the Baabda district. He was born in the Lebanese capital, Beirut, in 1948 to a Druze family. He holds a law degree in Lebanese law and French law from Saint Joseph University in Beirut, a diploma from the European University Institute in Nancy, France, and a certificate in comparative law.
