= Paul Morcos =

Lebanese lawyer

- بول مرقس
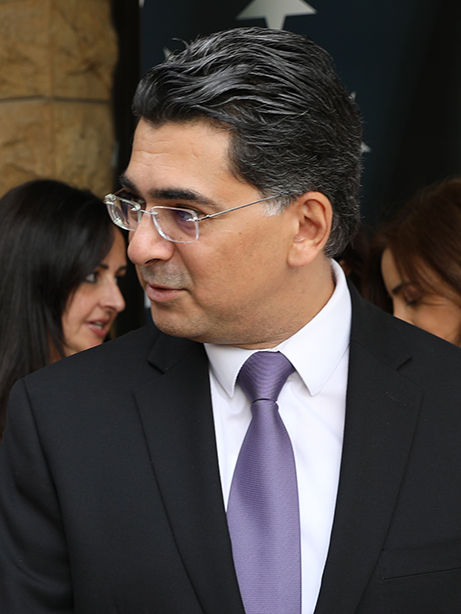
- Morcos in 2025

Minister of Information
- Incumbent
- Assumed office 8 February 2025
- President: Joseph Aoun
- Prime Minister: Nawaf Salam
- Preceded by: Ziad Makary

Personal details
- Born: Lebanon
- Citizenship: Lebanese
- Party: Independent
- Education: Saint Joseph University, American University of Beirut, Lebanese University; Sagesse University; Institute of Law, University Nancy II Lorraine
- Occupation: Lawyer, Politician
- Cabinet: Nawaf Salam cabinet

Paul Morcos (Arabic: بول مرقس) is a Lebanese politician and lawyer, who serves as the Minister of Information of Lebanon since February 2025 in the cabinet of Nawaf Salam. He is the founder of JUSTICIA Consulting Law Firm.

== Early life and education ==
Morcos has studied law and business laws in multiple universities, such as Saint Joseph University, the American University of Beirut, the Lebanese University, Sagesse University, and the Institute of Law. Morcos holds a French State Doctorate in Law from the University Nancy II Lorraine, France and has completed legal courses in the United States, including in Washington, Pennsylvania, Texas, and Nevada.

== Career ==
As a legal consultant, Morcos worked from 1998 to 2001 at Byblos Bank. Then, he began working in 2001 at the Bank of Beirut and the Arab Countries. From 2013 to 2018, he worked at the Union of Arab Banks.

In 2008, he founded JUSTICIA Beirut Consult, a legal consulting firm specializing in business law and governance.

Morcos also pursued an academic career. He worked as a professor at Sagesse University from 2003 to 2010. In 2007, he became a lecturer at the American University of Beirut, giving courses on Lebanese and US Business Laws until 2013. From 2008 to 2009, Morcos began teaching at Saint Joseph University, Faculty of Religious Sciences, where he gave courses on human rights and professional sessions, and at the same time, he also began working at the Lebanese University, School of Law, where he taught corporate law from 2008 to 2010.

He served as a trainer at the Beirut Bar Association from 2011 to 2020, and since 2011, has continued teaching Banking Law at Saint Joseph University. In 2023, he was appointed Dean of the International Executive School in Strasbourg, France.

== Minister of Information ==
In February 2025 Morkos was appointed as Lebanon's Minister of Information. He has modernized Lebanon's media sector promoting transparency in government communication, and addressing disinformation. On 16 March 2026 he ordered all media (television, radio and the national news agency) to stop using the word - "resistance" affiliated to Hezbollah, meaning they are not to call them by that name anymore.
