= Ghazi Wazni =

Lebanese politician

- غازي وزني

Minister of Finance
- In office 21 January 2020 – 10 September 2021
- Prime Minister: Hassan Diab
- Preceded by: Ali Hassan Khalil
- Succeeded by: Youssef Khalil

Personal details
- Born: 1954 (age 71–72) Bint Jbeil, Lebanon

Ghazi Wazni (Arabic: غازي وزني, born 1954) is a Lebanese Shiite politician who served as Minister of Finance in the cabinet of Hassan Diab from 21 January to 10 September 2021.

== Biography ==
Wazni was born in Bint Jbeil in 1954. He graduated from Paris Dauphine University in Paris, France, and earned a PhD in 1983.
