= Adel Nassar =

Lebanese lawyer, legal scholar, and politician

- عادل نصار
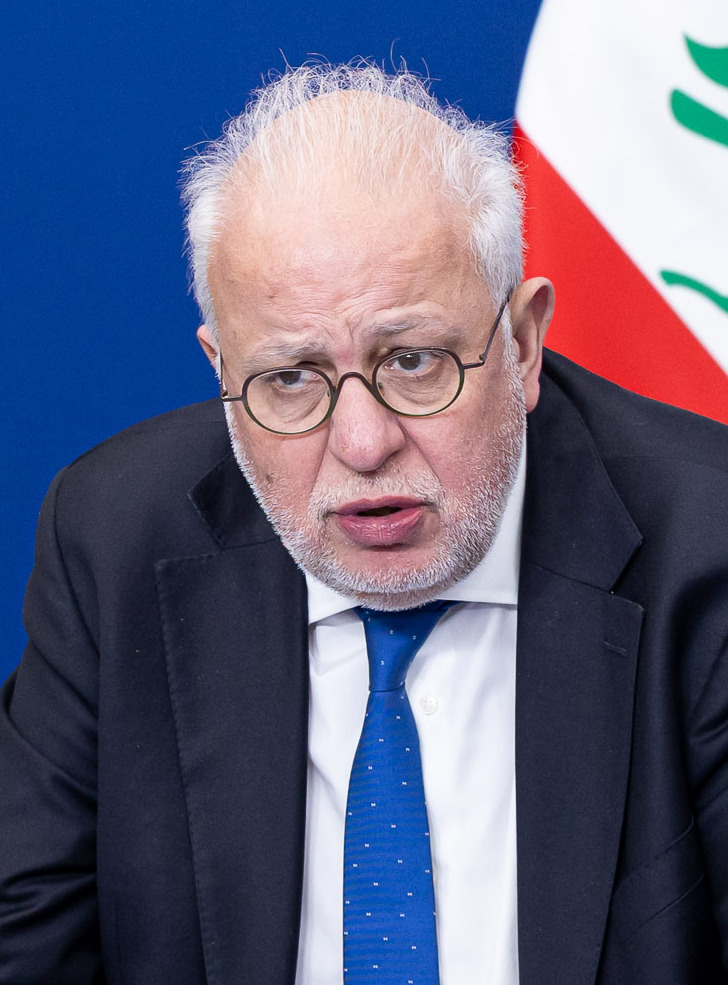
- Nassar in 2025

Minister of Justice
- Incumbent
- Assumed office 8 February 2025
- President: Joseph Aoun
- Prime Minister: Nawaf Salam
- Preceded by: Henri Khouri

Personal details
- Born: 25 November 1964 (age 61) Bekfaya, Lebanon
- Party: Kataeb Party
- Spouse: Leila Maria Al-Asmar
- Children: 3
- Education: Saint Joseph University; Paris 2 Panthéon-Assas University; Harvard University
- Profession: Lawyer; politician

Adel Nassar (Arabic: عادل نصار; born November 25, 1964) is a Lebanese lawyer, legal scholar, and politician serving as the Minister of Justice in the cabinet of Prime Minister Nawaf Salam since February 8, 2025.

== Early life and education ==
Adel Nassar was born into a prominent legal family of Maronite Catholic faith. He is the son of Amine Nassar, a former President of the Supreme Judicial Council of Lebanon during Amine Gemayel's mandate. He completed his secondary education at the Collège Notre-Dame de Jamhour. He completed masters in Law at Saint Joseph University in Beirut and Harvard in Boston and obtained a Diploma of Advanced Studies (DEA) in Private and Public Law from Paris II University – Panthéon-Assas.

== Career ==
He began his career as a trainee lawyer and later became a partner at the Beirut-based law firm Raphaël & Associés. He also practiced in Paris with the firm Thieffry & Associés. Nassar is a member of both the Beirut Bar Association (admitted 1987) and the Paris Bar Association (admitted 1993). His legal practice focused on banking, mergers and acquisitions, and energy law. Between 2012 and 2015 he served as the representative for Lebanon at the International Court of Arbitration (ICC).

=== Minister of Justice ===
Nassar was appointed Minister of Justice on February 8, 2025, following the formation of Prime Minister Nawaf Salam's government, after being nominated by the Kataeb Party. His appointment came after a prolonged political deadlock and was seen as a move to place technocratic experts with political backing in key portfolios. Upon taking office, Nassar declared the independence of the judiciary as his primary objective. In July 2025, he oversaw the finalization of long-awaited judicial appointments and transfers by the Higher Judicial Council (HJC), a process that had been stalled for years due to political interference. On the 14 October 2025, Adel Nassar reached an agreement with Syria to provide all available information related to security incidents that occurred in Lebanon during the Syrian occupation of Lebanon particularly the assassinations of political and public figures.

Nassar has publicly supported the continuation of the investigation into the 2020 Beirut Port explosion, pledging to protect the judicial investigator from political obstruction. In meetings with international human rights organizations, including Amnesty International in late 2025, he reiterated the government's commitment to accountability for the blast victims.

Facing severe overcrowding in Lebanese prisons, Nassar initiated negotiations with the Syrian government in mid-2025 to repatriate Syrian nationals convicted of non-terrorism offenses. He proposed a treaty allowing these inmates to serve the remainder of their sentences in Syria, framing the initiative as a necessary humanitarian and logistical measure for the Lebanese penitentiary system.

On 7 March 2026, he said he is considering taking legal actions against Hezbollah Secretary General Sheikh Naim Qassem, following Qassem's controversial remarks in which he accused the government of carrying out Israeli orders.

== Personal life ==
Adel Nassar is married to Leila Maria Al-Asmar and together have three children: Riya Maria, Amin, and Jawad.
