= Ziad Makary =

Lebanese politician

Ziad Al-Makary
- زياد المكاري

Minister of Information
- In office 10 March 2022 – 8 February 2025
- President: Michel Aoun; Joseph Aoun
- Prime Minister: Najib Mikati
- Preceded by: Abbas Halabi (ad interim)
- Succeeded by: Paul Morcos

Personal details
- Born: 1968 (age 57–58) Zgharta,Lebanon
- Citizenship: Lebanese
- Party: Independent
- Education: University of Balamand – the Lebanese Academy of Fine Arts (ALBA), École nationale supérieure d'architecture de Paris-Belleville (ENSAPB)
- Occupation: Architect
- Cabinet: Third cabinet of Najib Mikati

Ziad Al-Makary is a Lebanese politician who served as Minister of Information in the Third Cabinet of Najib Mikati.
