= Yassine Jaber =

Lebanese politician (born 1951)

- ياسين جابر
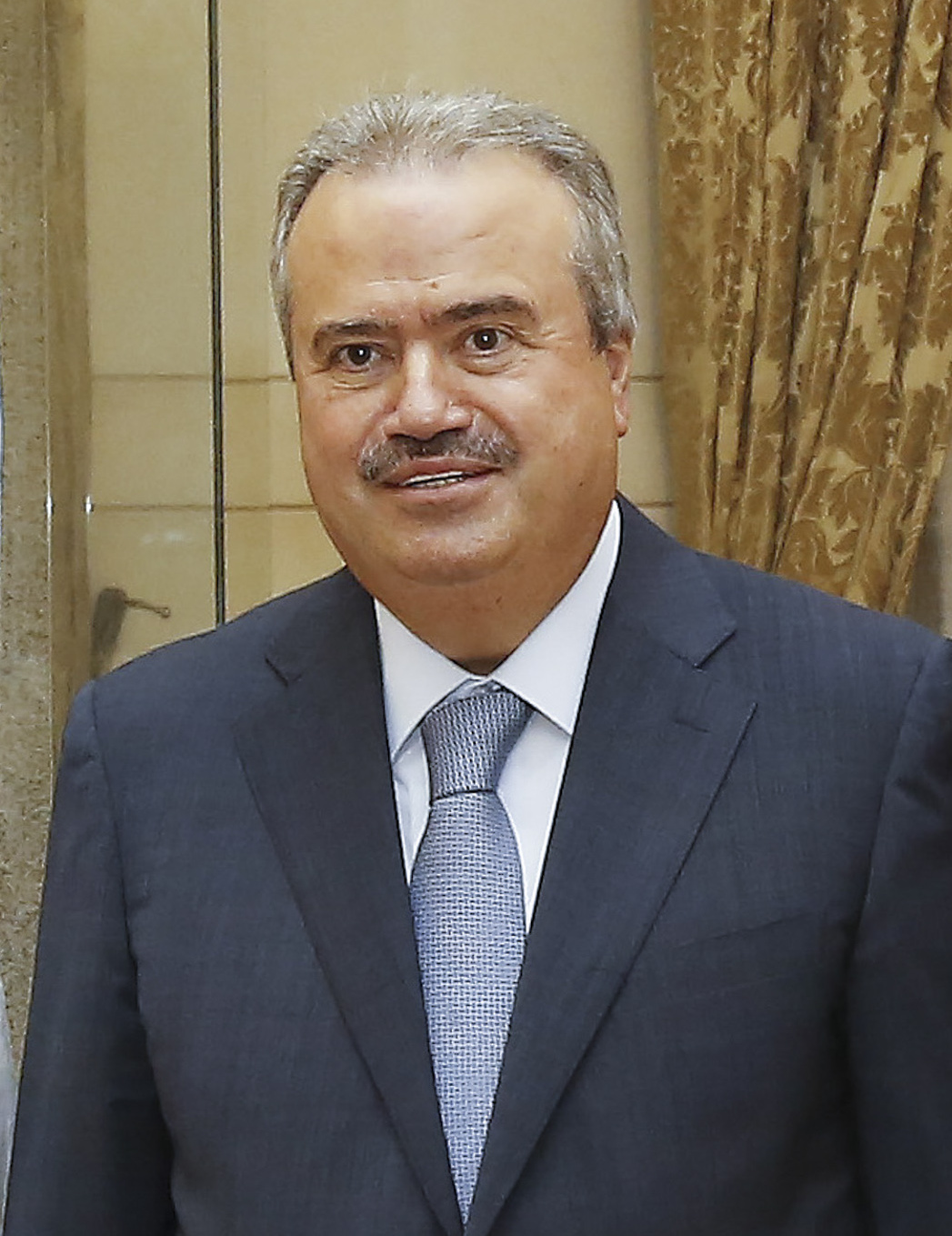
- Jaber in 2016

Minister of Finance
- Incumbent
- Assumed office 8 February 2025
- President: Joseph Aoun
- Prime Minister: Nawaf Salam
- Preceded by: Youssef Khalil

Member of the Lebanese Parliament
- In office 15 October 1996 – 21 May 2022
- Constituency: Nabatieh

Personal details
- Born: 1951 (age 74–75) Lagos, Nigeria
- Party: Amal Movement
- Education: American University of Beirut (BA)
- Cabinet: Nawaf Salam cabinet (2025–present)

Yassine Jaber (Arabic: ياسين جابر) is a Lebanese politician and businessman. He represented the Nabatiyeh district in the Lebanese Parliament from 1996 until 2022. Although an independent that has never been a member of any party, due to the Shiite power sharing structures he is affiliated with the Liberation and Development bloc led by Parliamentary Speaker Nabih Berri. He is currently serving as the Minister of Finance in the Cabinet of Nawaf Salam.

== Biography ==
Jaber was born in Lagos, Nigeria in 1951. After graduating with a BA in Business Administration from the American University of Beirut in 1973, Jaber founded a financial company in the capital and worked there until the beginning of the Lebanese Civil War in 1975.

Jaber spent 1976-1978 abroad, working mainly in Saudi Arabia, Africa, Britain and Los Angeles in the contracting and international trade sectors, and returned to Lebanon to launch real estate, tourism and hotel projects in Beirut. From 1981, he primarily resided in London where he was a member of the Board of Directors of the British-Lebanese Friendship Society and of the Advisory Council of the Arab Community in Britain.

Following the conclusion of the Lebanese Civil War, Jaber returned to Lebanon in 1995 to serve as Minister of Economy and Trade in Rafik Hariri's government.

Appointed Minister of Economy from 1995 to 1998, he was part of the Rafik Hariri Government engaging in the reconstruction of Lebanon. Jaber advocated for free trade with the United States and other countries.

Jaber was appointed Minister of Public Works and Transport from 2004 to 2005 as part of Omar Karami's government.

In the May 2018 elections, Jaber won 7,920 preferential votes under a newly instituted, hybrid voting system that put him in 71st place out of 515 total candidates across the country.

He was a prominent member of the Parliamentary Finance committee, as well as head of the Foreign Affairs committee for many years.

A vocal critic of Lebanon's political class for not implementing reforms, he cited "an absence of any vision for recovering from the crisis" in his decision not to seek office again, stepping down as an MP in 2022 after 27 years.

Wikileaks cables revealed him to be openly critical of Hezbollah's influence in the country with successive U.S. administrations.

Considered a liberal politician, Jaber supports what he believes as human rights through equitable economic development in other countries such as in South Africa

He returned to politics in February 2025 as Minister of Finance within Nawaf Salam's "Reform and Rescue" government, tasked with implementing financial reforms and negotiating relief packages with institutions such as the International Monetary Fund. Jaber comes from a very large & influential Shiite family from Nabatieh South Lebanon

== See also ==
- Lebanese Parliament
- Members of the 2009-2013 Lebanese Parliament
