= Nora Bayrakdarian =

Minister of Youth and Sports of Lebanon

- نورا بايرقداريان
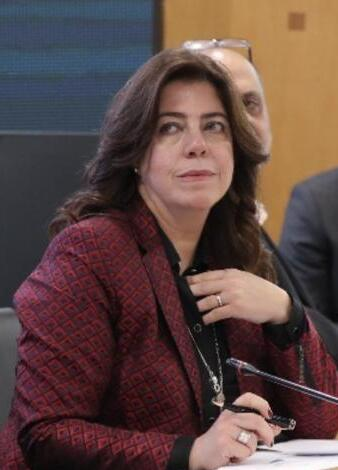
- Bayrakdarian in 2019

Minister of Youth and Sports
- Incumbent
- Assumed office 8 February 2025
- President: Joseph Aoun
- Prime Minister: Nawaf Salam

Personal details
- Born: Lebanon
- Party: Tashnag Party
- Education: Lebanese University, La Sorbonne
- Occupation: Professor, Politician
- Cabinet: Nawaf Salam cabinet

Nora Bayrakdarian (Armenian: Նորա Պայրագտարեան, Arabic: نورا بايرقداريان) is a Lebanese Professor of Armenian descent. She is professor of International Relations and Head of International Relations Department at the Faculty of Law and Political Science at the Lebanese University and also member of the Scientific Council of the Doctoral School of Law, Political, Administrative and Economic Sciences. She is a Senior Lecturer of International Relations in the Department of Political Science and Public Administration of the American University of Beirut. She is member of the Economic, Social and Environmental Council of Lebanon for a second term and President of the Commission on Science, Technology and Innovation in the Council.

Bayrakdarian is currently a member of the Central Committee of the Armenian Orthodox Church Holy See of Cilicia for a second term.

On February 9, 2025, Bayrakdarian was appointed Minister of Youth and Sports in Nawaf Salam’s government, the first government of Joseph Aoun’s Mandate.

== Biography ==
Bayrakdarian studied Political science at the Faculty of Law and Political science of the Lebanese University at both undergraduate and graduate levels. She was granted a scholarship from the French National Centre for Scientific Research in her higher studies, after the completion of the DEA degree due to her outstanding results. Her DEA thesis entitled "The Palestinian Question, from the Resolution 242 to the conclusion of the Gaza-Jericho agreement", supervised by Professor Georges Charaf, was granted the highest score within the faculty. She then attended La Sorbonne University in Paris and earned a PHD in International Relations with the highest Honours (Very Honorable With Congratulations of the Jury), under the supervision of Professor Charles Zorgbibe, author of more than 40 books in International Relations. In 2017, She earned the Professor title from the Lebanese University.

== Career ==
After having served as an associate and later as a Full Professor at the Faculty of Law and Political Science at the Lebanese University, Bayrakdarian is currently the chairperson of the Department of International Relations in the Faculty and served for three terms as member of the Scientific Council. She worked as a visiting professor at the Universite Saint-Joseph in 2006 and also for more than 10 years at La Sagesse university at both graduate and undergraduate levels. She taught for three consecutive years in a professional interdisciplinary Masters on Peace and Cooperation organized jointly by the Lebanese University, Holy Spirit University of Kaslik and the three Italian universities La Sapienza, Roma Tre University and University of Pavia. She coordinated Political Science at the military faculty of the Lebanese Armed Forces where she taught from 2007 till 2020. She is currently serving in the Doctoral School of Law, Political, Administrative and Economic Sciences, where she presides the Commission on Political Science.

== Other experiences ==
- Achievement: contribution as President of the Commission on Science, Technology and Innovation in The Economic and Social Council in the development of a strategy paper at the National level entitled “Strategy of Science, Technology and Innovation in the service of sustainable development in Lebanon” through a participatory methodology, integrating the participation of 17 Universities, multiple research centers and the syndicates and stakeholders concerned. (2018- 2020)
- Elected by the Embassy of the United States of America in Lebanon, and subsequently, by the United States Department of State as part of an exchange program to represent Lebanon in the training of professionals in New York and Washington at Bard College, on "The foreign policy of The United States ". (July–August 2014)
- Visit to the European Institutions in Brussels, following an official invitation from Mr. Patrick Laurent, President of the Delegation of the European Commission, August - September 2008
- Lecturing on Representative Democracy and Power Sharing, Representative Democracy and the Role of Parliamentary Committees, (4 conferences) (2010- 2012), at the Lebanese Parliament, as part of a collaboration project between the Lebanese University and the Westminster Foundation for Democracy, London, and the Lebanese Parliament.
- Member of the Central Committee of the World Council of Churches, elected by the 9th General Assembly of the Council, in Brazil, February 2006
- Participation in the International Seminar organized by the Ecumenical Institute of Bossey and the University of Geneva, in Switzerland, from June 4–11, 2003, under the title “Women in Mission” and Speaker on “Dialogue of Missions in Multifaith Societies”..
- Participation in the Conference of international experts invited to Hong Kong under the title "International Ecumenical Conference on a Peace Treaty for the Korean Peninsula" Hong Kong 15-16 Nov. 2016, chair of two sessions on the challenges and opportunities of a peace treaty for the Korean peninsula, organized by the CCIA.
- Appointed member of the Commission of Churches on International Affairs CCIA (WCC) at the World Council of Churches in July 2014, representing the Armenian Orthodox Church on the Commission. Reelected for a second term in June 2023.
- Participation to the 11th Assembly of The WCC in Karlsruhe, Germany (30 August-9 September) and working as the Rapporteur of the Public Issues Committee

== Major works ==
Bayrakdarian is the author of numerous books and journal articles in a variety of International topics

=== Selected books ===
- Politique extérieure et Politique Intérieure, (Bruylant, Delta, LGDJ, 2006.)
- Liban: entre Stabilité Intérieure et Sécurité Régionale, (Bruylant, Delta, LGDJ, July 2007)
- Scientific Research Methods and Techniques, (Lebanese University, October 2008).

=== Peer-reviewed journal articles ===
- “Towards Wider Governance of the Extra-Atmospheric Space”, The Emirates Center for Strategic Studies and Research, Vol 2, N0 8, (October 2014):106-139
- “Multilateralism in U.S. Foreign Policy”, The Political Science Review of The Lebanese University, No 1/2016: 175-199
- “The Reconfiguration of World Governance”, The Political Science Review of The Lebanese University, No 4/2016: 183-205
- “World War I and Contemporary Armenian History”, The USEK Review of History, No 24/2017:185-212
- “Towards a Peace Regime for the Korean Peninsula”, The Political Science Review of the Lebanese University, No 2/2017: 329-355
