= Youssef Rajji =

Lebanese diplomat (born 1962)

- يوسف رجّي
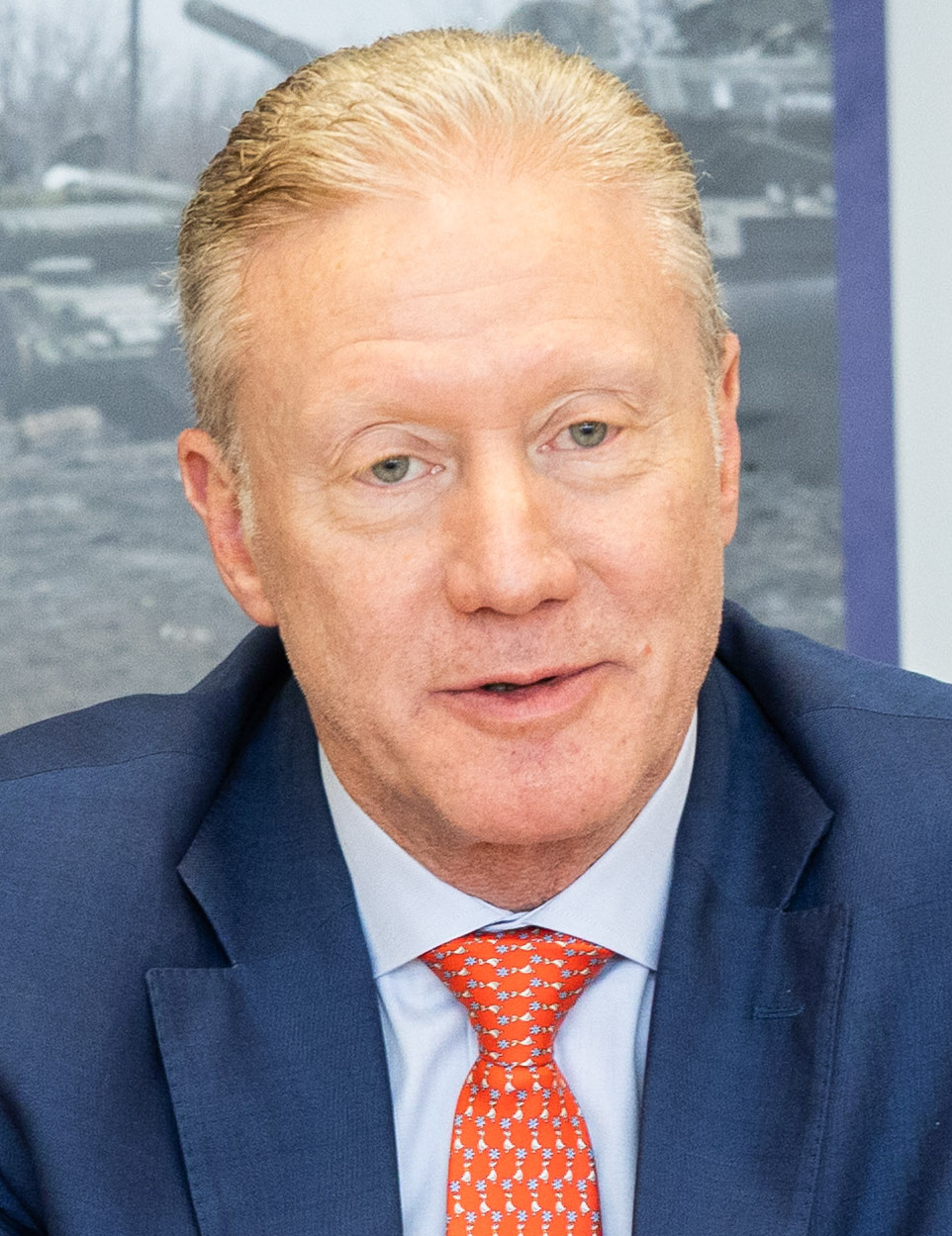
- Rajji in 2025

Minister of Foreign Affairs and Emigrants
- Incumbent
- Assumed office 8 February 2025
- Prime Minister: Nawaf Salam
- Preceded by: Abdallah Bou Habib

Ambassador of Lebanon to Jordan
- In office 2022 – 8 February 2025
- Preceded by: Tracy Chamoun
- Succeeded by: Georges Fadel (acting)

Personal details
- Born: 20 November 1962 (age 63) Beirut, Lebanon
- Party: Lebanese Forces
- Education: Saint Joseph University of Beirut (Masters); University of Paris (Diploma)
- Profession: Diplomat

Youssef "Joe" Rajji (Arabic: يوسف رجّي; born 20 November 1962) is a Lebanese diplomat who has served as minister of foreign affairs and emigrants in the cabinet of Prime Minister Nawaf Salam since February 2025. He previously served as Lebanon's ambassador to Jordan from 2022 to 2025.

== Early life and education ==
Rajji was born in Beirut on 20 November 1962. He holds a master's degree in Political and Administrative Sciences from Saint Joseph University of Beirut and a diploma in Media and Political Communication from the University of Paris. He is fluent in Arabic, English, and French.

== Diplomatic career ==
Rajji joined Lebanon's diplomatic service in 1992. Key assignments include:

- 1995–1999: Political affairs officer at the Lebanese Embassy in Washington, D.C., focusing on U.S.-Lebanon relations.
- 1999–2002: Deputy head of mission at the Lebanese Embassy in Brussels, overseeing engagement with the European Union.
- 2004–2005: Deputy head of Lebanon's permanent mission to the United Nations in Geneva.
- 2005–2017: Senior roles at the Lebanese Embassy in Rabat, Morocco, including acting as chargé d'affaires during transitional periods.
- 2017–2022: Director of Inspection at Lebanon's Ministry of Foreign Affairs, overseeing diplomatic protocol and compliance.
- 2022–2025: Ambassador to Jordan, where he mediated bilateral discussions on trade and refugee repatriation.

=== Foreign minister ===
Rajji was appointed foreign minister in February 2025 as part of Prime Minister Nawaf Salam's technocratic cabinet, formed amid Lebanon's ongoing political and economic crises. He was appointed by the Lebanese Forces party. His appointment drew praise from international figures, including Kaja Kallas, the EU High Representative for Foreign Affairs, who called his leadership "critical for regional stability."

On 2 October 2025 he announced the launch of the online platform for Lebanese diaspora to register digitally for the upcoming 2026 parliamentary elections. This initiative was done to boost diaspora voter participation. This is part of joint effort between the Foreign Ministry and Interior Ministry to make voter registration clear and accurate, and to encourage full participation of Lebanese citizens abroad in the upcoming elections. By mid-November reports say that over 100,000 Lebanese diaspora have registered to the platform.

On 8 March 2026, Following the 2026 Iran war and the attacks carried out by Hezbollah against Cyprus, targeting British military bases, Rajji condemned the attacks in a message he sent to Cypriote counterpart Constantinos Kombos. Rajji said that "Lebanon will not serve as a platform for implementing foreign agendas and urged Cyprus not to confuse the Lebanese state with groups operating outside its authority and legal framework".

Later in an extraordinary virtual meeting of the Council of the Arab League he said that "Hezbollah had disregarded Lebanon's national interests, stressing that the Lebanese government and people are not responsible for the group's actions". He then continued to say that he: "expressed deep regret that Hezbollah had once again ignored Lebanon's supreme national interests in favor of external agendas".

On March 19, 2026, while taking part in the emergency meeting held in Riyadh, to discuss Iran's aggression against its Muslim neighboring states he emphasized that "the Lebanese government is determined and resolved to wrest Lebanon from the clutches of the Iranian grip, after it instructed Hezbollah to drag Lebanon into a war it did not choose,".

On March 24, 2026, Rajji declared the Iranian ambassador Mohammad Reza Raouf Sheibani as PNG (persona non grata), giving him until Sunday to leave the country. He was quoted saying "in light of what the Lebanese state described as Tehran's violation of diplomatic norms and established practices between the two countries".

== Political positions ==
Rajji has emphasized the need for Lebanon to maintain neutrality in regional conflicts and strengthen ties with Arab and European partners. He has also advocated for reforms to streamline consular services for the Lebanese diaspora.

== See also ==
- Foreign relations of Lebanon
- Cabinet of Nawaf Salam
