= Youssef Khalil =

Lebanese politician

- يوسف خليل
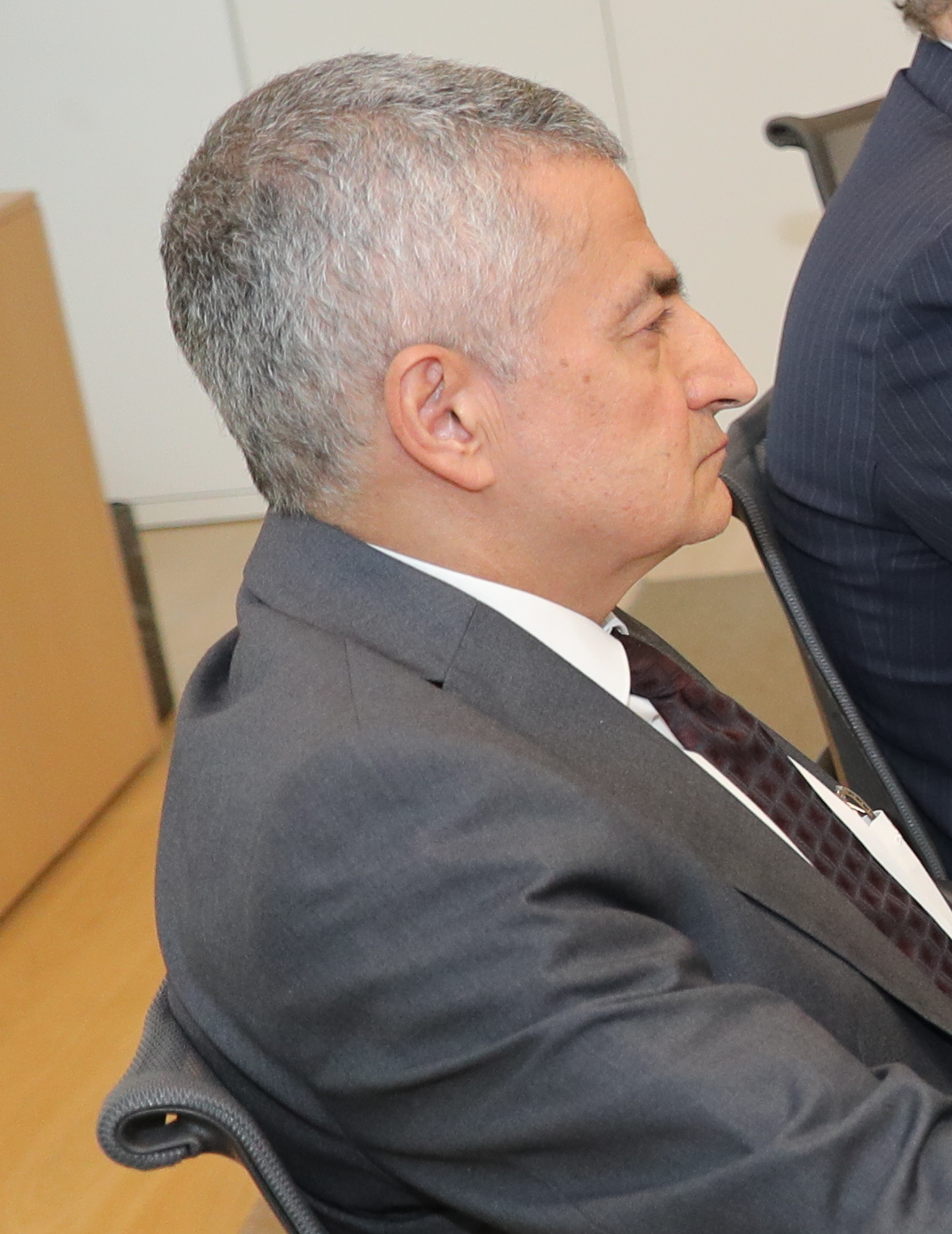
- Khalil in 2022

Minister of Finance
- In office 10 September 2021 – 8 February 2025
- Prime Minister: Najib Mikati
- Preceded by: Ghazi Wazni
- Succeeded by: Yassine Jaber

Personal details
- Born: 1958 (age 67–68) Tyre, Lebanon
- Party: Independent

Youssef Khalil (Arabic: يوسف خليل, Born in Tyre, South Lebanon in 1958) is a Lebanese economist and politician who served as Minister of Finance in the Najib Mikati cabinet from 2021 to 2025.

== Biography ==
=== Education ===
He holds a PhD in economics from the Center for Studies and Research on International Development (CERDI) at the Clermont Auvergne University in France, a master's degree in Economic Development from the University of Sussex in the UK, and a bachelor's degree in economics from the American University of Beirut. He is the author of published articles on Economic Development in Lebanon and the region.

=== Career ===
Khalil joined the Banque du Liban as an economist in 1982, where his most recent appointment was as executive director of BDL's Financial Operations department. He is also a part-time lecturer at the American University of Beirut, where his main emphasis has been on Development Economics. Khalil is the co-founder and president of the Association for the Development of Rural Capacities (ADR), an NGO with projects pertaining to low income housing, microfinance, vocational training agricultural development.

Khalil is a member at a number of non-governmental organizations, including the Euro-Arab Association for Development and Integration (READI) and the president of Teach for Lebanon (TFL), the Lebanese Microfinance Association (LMFA), and the Lebanese Jiu-jitsu Federation.

== Personal life ==
Youssef is married and has two children Soraya and Nadim.
