= George Kordahi =

Lebanese television personality and politician

George Kordahi جورج قرداحي
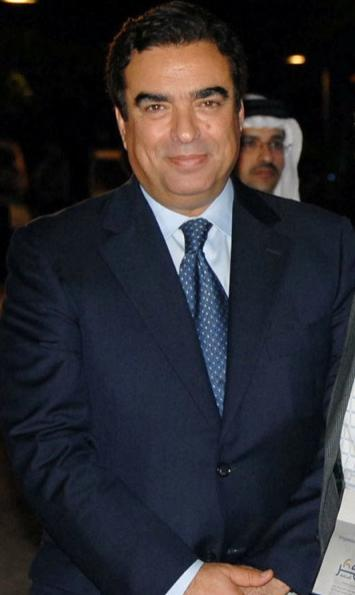
- Kordahi in 2007

Minister of Information
- In office 10 September 2021 – 3 December 2021
- Prime Minister: Najib Mikati
- Preceded by: Manal Abdel Samad
- Succeeded by: Abbas Halabi (ad interim)

Personal details
- Born: George Gabriel Al Kordahi; 1 May 1950 (age 76) Faitroun, Lebanon
- Party: Marada Movement
- Spouse: Ida Kassar
- Children: 3
- Occupation: TV presenter, Minister of Information (2021)
- Website: http://www.georgekordahi.com

George Fouad Kordahi (Arabic: جورج فؤاد قرداحي; born 1 May 1950) is a Lebanese TV presenter. He was the host of the Arabic version of Who Wants to Be a Millionaire? and served as the Minister of Information of Lebanon during Third cabinet of Najib Mikati.

== Education ==
Kordahi was educated at the Notre Dame de Louayzeh College (Keserwan). He studied Political Science and Law in Lebanon.

== Career ==
Kordahi started his career with the newspaper Lisan al Hal in 1970. He worked for Télé Liban in 1973 until the start of the Lebanese Civil War, when he immigrated to France. In 1979, he joined Radio Monte Carlo in Paris, where he was appointed editor-in-chief.

In 1992, Kordahi moved on to run Sharq Radio Station in Paris and remained there for around two years.

In 1994, he was recruited to head MBC FM in London.

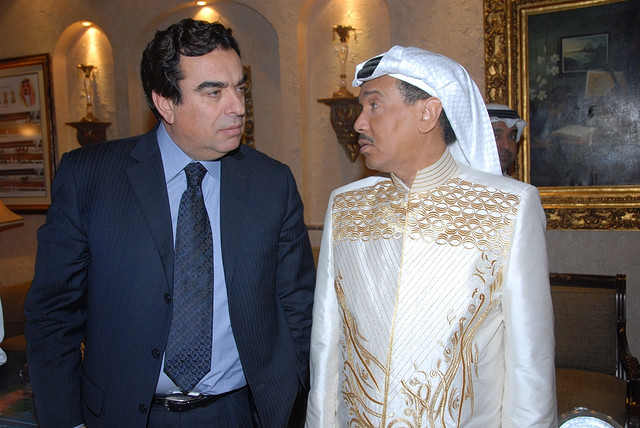
George Kurdahi with Saudi singer Mohammed Abdu

In 2004, Kordahi moved to the Lebanese Broadcasting Corporation for one year, before being asked by MBC to return as the presenter of his old program and several other programs. In his move to LBC to present Iftah Albak, Kurdahi became one of the prominent TV presenters in the Arab world. Advertising spots on his shows reached record numbers, both in popularity as well as ratings.

Throughout his career, Kordahi used his stardom to support charities in advancing their efforts for the public good. He notably partnered with "Tamkeen" which operates under the umbrella of the Knowledge and Human Development Authority in Dubai. He provided Tamkeen's visually impaired students with new educational tools.

Kurdahi was chosen as a UN Goodwill Ambassador.

In 2011, he departed MBC after making a statement in which he supported the Syrian government during the Syrian civil war, and stated that "there was a conspiracy against the Syrian government from Arab TV station." Subsequently, his shows were canceled from MBC and he eventually joined Al Mayadeen TV station. He participated as MC of the show "You Deserve It" which was copyrighted by ABC TV station in America.

In 2012, Kurdahi joined Al Hayat TV and Mehwar TV to present the TV shows Who Wants to be A Millionaire, Al-Mosameh Karim and Hafez wala Fahem.

Kurdahi has also launched his own brand of perfume, called G.K.

On 10 September 2021, he was selected by the Marada Movement as their pick for the Minister of Information of Lebanon.

On 2 December 2021, Kordahi announced to local TV stations that he planned to step down as Information Minister following a diplomatic crisis with Saudi Arabia and other Gulf states. The crisis was triggered by comments Kordahi made in a TV interview with Al Jazeera Online about the war in Yemen. He resigned the following day.

== Personal life ==
Kurdahi is married to Ida Kassar, with whom he has three children. After living in Europe and other Arab countries for many years, he currently resides in his home town of Feitroun.

He speaks Arabic, French, English, and Italian.
