= Disarmament of Hezbollah =

- Location: Lebanon
- Cause: United Nations Security Council Resolutions 1559 (2004) and 1701 (2006): The government views these arms as a catalyst for conflict that draws war into Lebanon and deters investment, serving as an obstacle to stability. It maintains that the existence of an armed militia is fundamentally incompatible with the nature of a free, sovereign state and is untenable
- Motive: Establishing the sovereignty of the Lebanese state over all its territory and disarming militias.
- Participants: Lebanon; United States; Hezbollah

The disarmament of Hezbollah refers to the demand to limit or eliminate Hezbollah's military capabilities in Lebanon. Since its emergence in the 1980s, Hezbollah has operated as a Shiite Islamist group that embraces paramilitarism to attain its goals. Its key objectives include eliminating Western influence, destroying Israel, pledging allegiance to Iran's supreme leader, and establishing an Islamic government influenced by Iran's political ideology.

In early 2025, a new government was formed in Lebanon. At the same time, Hezbollah suffered a major decline in its power following a series of significant military setbacks suffered during its armed confrontation with Israel, which commenced on 8 October 2023, when Hezbollah intervened to support armed groups in Gaza. This presented the country with a chance to pursue Hezbollah's disarmament, as the newly elected president and prime minister had prioritized it. The government's main goals for the country's recovery include notable domestic reforms, in order to match international demands and receive the $1.1 billion aid promised to the country, depending on its capability to enforce those domestic reforms and disarm Hezbollah.

According to available sources, Hezbollah has closed the majority of its training facilities. In light of these developments, Lebanese President Joseph Aoun proposed a framework in which former Hezbollah members could be integrated into the Lebanese Armed Forces. However, he emphasized that such integration would not involve the creation of a distinct or autonomous military unit within the army, as was the case with certain militias incorporated following the conclusion of the Lebanese Civil War.

From Hezbollah's standpoint, the principal condition for advancing the disarmament process is the provision of guarantees by Israel, specifically a formal commitment to refrain from future attacks on Lebanon and a withdrawal from the five points. An Israeli official stated that before peace talks can progress, Hezbollah must disarm. The official also added that this will be very hard and that they do not know if it will succeed.

On 5 September 2025, the government met to review the Lebanese Army plan for confining all weapons in Lebanon to state control, focusing on the disarmament of Hezbollah. The meeting ended with the government accepting the army's plan.

Despite the ceasefire agreement, local and international attempts to disarm Hezbollah, reports say that from day one after the signing of the agreement, the organization began its rearmament.

== Background ==
Hezbollah is a Shiite Islamist militant group and political party based in Lebanon. It was formed in response to Israel's invasion of Lebanon, receiving support from Iran's Islamic Revolutionary Guard Corps and having political backing from Syria's Assad regime. Its political wing is legitimate, having seats in the Lebanese Parliament. Its independent armed wing, often viewed as more capable than the Lebanese Armed Forces (LAF), operates outside the state, undermining national sovereignty and the rule of law.

Since its establishment, Hezbollah has played a central role in many armed conflicts against Lebanon, Israel, and Syria. It played a major role in the Lebanese Civil War, managing to exclude itself from the Taif agreement signed by all other parties of the Lebanese Civil War in 1989. Until 2000, it fought a guerrilla war in Southern Lebanon against Israel, leading to its withdrawal. In 2006, Hezbollah's cross-border raid kidnapping two Israeli soldiers started a 34-day war with Israel, which resulted in many casualties and widespread destruction in Lebanon. In 2008, Hezbollah turned its power against Lebanon during a political crisis as it briefly took hold of West Beirut by force. Then in 2011, it took part in the Syrian civil war as an ally of Bashar al-Assad's regime. Following the war, it increased its military arsenal.

A day after the October 7 attacks, Hezbollah started firing guided rockets and artillery shells into Israel, starting the largest escalation between the sides since 2006. The height of the campaign was in September 2024 when Israel eliminated Hezbollah's leadership, including Hassan Nasrallah, followed by heavy losses estimated at thousands of fighters, and significant blows to its missile infrastructure. On 27 November 2024, a ceasefire was brokered by the United States and France. As a new government rose during 2025, it increased its pressure on Hezbollah to bring its weapons under state control, while Hezbollah itself remains resistant to full disarmament.

== Legal and political framework ==
=== Taif Agreement (1989) ===
The Taif Agreement, which ended the Lebanese Civil War, called for the disbanding of all Lebanese militias; all parties signed the agreement. However, Hezbollah was informally exempted on the grounds that it was a resistance force fighting Israeli occupation—an occupation that ended in 2000.

=== United Nations Security Council Resolution 1559 (2004) ===
Resolution 1559 was issued in 2004, and it explicitly called for the disbandment and disarmament of all the militias and organizations within Lebanon, regardless of whether they are Lebanese or non-Lebanese. Once again, Hezbollah was not named specifically in the resolution, but it was understood that it included Hezbollah as well. As of 2025, the organization has yet to disarm itself, violating the resolution.

=== United Nations Security Council Resolution 1701 (2006) ===
Resolution 1701 was created after the 2006 Lebanon War between Hezbollah and Israel. Once again, this resolution reiterated the call for the disarmament of all armed groups in Lebanon, and called for the deployment of the Lebanese army and United Nations Interim Force in Lebanon (UNIFIL) in southern Lebanon.

== Economic aspect ==
In October 2024, the Financial Action Task Force (FATF) placed Lebanon on its grey list, citing serious shortcomings in combating money laundering and terrorist financing. This designation subjects Lebanon to increased international monitoring and pressure to implement urgent financial reforms. The decision comes amid a deep and prolonged economic crisis that began in 2019, worsened by the COVID-19 pandemic and the devastating 2020 Beirut port explosion. With its banking sector in collapse and a growing reliance on cash transactions, Lebanon has struggled to regulate financial flows effectively.

The FATF has pointed out key concerns. Lebanon has a weak court system that is influenced by politics, and the government hasn't done enough to stop money from going to terrorist groups connected to local militias. Being placed on the "grey list" has serious effects: it scares away foreign investors, makes it harder for people to send or receive money from abroad, and increases paperwork and costs for Lebanese banks. This listing shows that Lebanon urgently needs to improve its rules and systems to fight money laundering and terrorism funding, in order to rebuild trust with the global financial community. This is directly connected to Hezbollah as the FATF grey listing of Lebanon, as it has a significant role in both Lebanon's political system and its financial environment, which the FATF and international authorities identify as major obstacles to effective anti-money laundering and counter-terrorism financing (AML/CFT) enforcement.

== Timeline ==
In February 2025, a new Lebanese government was formed, ending Najib Mikati's caretaker rule. One of its agendas was disarming Hezbollah. In the same month, U.S. envoy Morgan Ortagus visited Lebanon, where she spoke firmly that the Lebanese government must disarm Hezbollah or "face increased isolation". During the visit, she met both President Joseph Aoun and Prime Minister Nawaf Salam, as well as Parliament Speaker Nabih Berri.

During March - April 2025, additional Lebanese soldiers were deployed in southern Lebanon to strengthen and assist in dismantling Hezbollah infrastructure. It was also reported that 90% of Hezbollah's outposts in South Lebanon were handed over.

On 15 April 2025, in an interview, President Aoun spoke about a non-violent approach towards the issue of Hezbollah's disarmament, reaching the goal through dialogue and coordination with the Parliament speaker.

On 27 April 2025, despite the ceasefire, Israel conducted an airstrike on Hezbollah installations in southern Beirut.

In late April 2025, according to the Lebanese Army, 90% of Hezbollah's military infrastructure south of the Litani River was dismantled, so taking hold of former Hezbollah strongholds.

On 4 July 2025, according to reports, Hezbollah held an internal strategic review in order to consider partial disarmament or scaling down its armed presence, due to its major losses during 2024, financial pressure, ongoing Israeli strikes, and the diminishing of Iranian support, along with the fall of the Assad regime.

Reports emerge that Hezbollah is conducting a major internal strategic review considering partial disarmament or scaling down its armed presence, driven by massive losses in the 2024 war, financial pressures, Israeli strikes, and the regional fallout from the fall of Assad's regime and diminished Iranian support.

The U.S. Presidential Envoy to Syria, Thomas Barrack, submitted a proposal during his visit in early July. On 5 July, Hezbollah described it as "a form of capitulation." Barrack first visited Beirut on 19 June.

On 7 July 2025, Thomas Barrack visited Beirut, where he met with President Aoun and Speaker of Parliament Nabih Berri. During the visit, President Aoun presented Barrack with Lebanese proposals for a comprehensive solution.

On 11 July 2025, Lebanese President Joseph Aoun dismissed the prospect of normalization with Israel at this stage, expressing support instead for a state of "no war" as long as parts of Lebanese territory remain under Israeli occupation. He stressed that the decision to reserve all arms exclusively for the state has been firmly made and is irreversible.

On 5 September 2025, Lebanon's government approved the army's plan presented by General Rodolphe Haykal to control all weapons, mainly Hezbollah's, despite the walkout of all five Shi'ite ministers. PM Nawaf Salam announced the decision, while Information Minister Paul Morcos admitted the army's limited capacity. Labor Minister Mohammad Haidar rejected the move as invalid without Shi'ite participation under Lebanon's power-sharing system.

In October 2025, Tom Barrack, the United States special envoy for Syria, cautioned that Hezbollah's military faction would encounter a significant confrontation with Israel unless Beirut took decisive measures. This warning comes in light of Israel's formidable strength. Lebanon is required to disarm Hezbollah and initiate discussions with Israel. The Lebanese military does not possess the necessary financial resources and authority to take action. Should Beirut persist in its indecision, Israel may proceed unilaterally, leading to severe repercussions, as disarming Hezbollah would ensure the security of Israel's northern frontiers.

On 8 January 2026, the Lebanese Forces claimed they had gained control over the area south of the Litani River, disarming Hezbollah and other militias. By this, they stated they are ready to move on to Phase 2 of the ceasefire agreement.

=== Rearmament ===
As of October 2025, reports show that Hezbollah, despite the ceasefire agreement and the Lebanese and international efforts to disarm the organization, has begun rearming itself. Hezbollah uses the seaport as well as smuggling routes from Syria to obtain new missiles, anti-tank missiles, rockets, and artillery. It also manufactures its own weapons, with the activity focused on the Beirut suburbs and the Beqaa Valley.

== Government decisions ==
=== 7 August ===
On 5 August 2025, a government meeting was held in Baabda Palace focused on the disarmament of Hezbollah. At the end of the meeting, the Lebanese Army was assigned to present a plan for the disarmament of Hezbollah and to return to a state monopoly over arms. In response to this, Hezbollah stated that the government has committed a "major sin" and the organization will treat the decision as nonexistent.

On 7 August, in a government meeting specifically addressing the disarmament of Hezbollah, the majority of the government voted to approve the decision. The Lebanese Army was tasked with creating a plan to ensure that only the state has control over weapons in Lebanon. The decision is based on a U.S. plan to disarm Hezbollah. Before the voting, several Shiite ministers, including members aligned with Hezbollah, Amal movement, and independent MP Fadi Makki walked out of the meeting.

Following the decision to disarm Hezbollah, Iran's Foreign Minister Abbas Araghchi stated that these efforts will fail and that Hezbollah has recovered and is in full force. This shows Iran's full support for Hezbollah. This caused resentment by the Lebanese government, bringing Lebanese Foreign Minister Youssef Rajji to summon the Iranian ambassador and disapprove of Iran's interference in Lebanon. While other voices, like MP Ghayath Yazbeck, called the comments "a complete violation of the dignity of a sovereign and independent state" and even urged a complaint to the UN Security Council.

=== 5 September ===
On 5 September 2025, the government met to review the Lebanese army plan for state control over all weapons, mainly Hezbollah's. At the end of the meeting, PM Nawaf Salam declared that the government accepted the army's plan presented by General Rodolphe Haykal. The approval was done even though all 5 Shi'ite ministers walked out of the meeting in protest of the government's stance.

According to Lebanese Information Minister Paul Morcos, the army will implement the plan even though it has limited personnel and capabilities. Labor Minister Mohammad Haidar said that any decisions made without the involvement of Shi'ites would be invalid, pointing to Lebanon's system of sharing power among different religious groups.

The roadmap presented to the Cabinet on 5 September 2025 has 5 phases:

Phase 1

During this phase, the Lebanese army will complete the disarmament south of the Litani River, where substantial weapons were already collected with the help of UNIFIL.

Phase 2

The Lebanese army will expand the operation to north of the Litani River up to the Awali River, which is the entryway to South Lebanon.

Phase 3

The Lebanese army will concentrate on Beirut and its suburbs in order to centralize control in a politically sensitive area.

Phase 4

The Lebanese army will focus on the Bekaa Valley region, extending its disarmament reach into eastern Lebanon.

Phase 5

This final phase of the roadmap will see further activities in the rest of the country, including the northern parts of Lebanon to ensure nationwide enforcement.

== Reactions ==
=== Domestic ===
==== President Joseph Aoun ====
Aoun's long-standing view is that only the state should hold arms and that Hezbollah's disarmament will be achieved only through dialogue, not force. On 26 July 2025, he acknowledged that the progress of the talks with Hezbollah is very slow. In his speech on 31 July 2025, in honor of the Lebanese Army's 80th anniversary, he addressed all parties, emphasizing the historic opportunity to disarm Hezbollah, while restoring and reinforcing state sovereignty.

==== Prime Minister Nawaf Salam ====
Salam's stand on this matter was made clear from day one of the new Lebanese government's formation; for him, the disarmament of Hezbollah is a priority. He wants to implement reforms and have a stronger state authority over arms. In response to Qassem's statement on 15 August 2025, Salam said that there is only one government that makes decisions in Lebanon, that there is no state that doesn't have arms monopoly, and in addressing Qassems threat of civil war, he said, "The implicit or direct threat of civil war, I believe that none of the Lebanese today, ... none of the Lebanese, young and old, men and women, in the south or in the north, wherever they are, none of them wants to return to civil war today".

==== Parliament Speaker Nabih Berri ====
Reports say that Hezbollah told Speaker Nabih Berri it will not give up its weapons, even if Israel pulls out of the occupied areas. Berri also said the government cannot promise to disarm groups north of the Litani River.

==== Samir Geagea ====
Samir Geagea, Executive Chairman of the Lebanese Forces, was quoted in an interview on 3 August 2025, claiming that "Hezbollah's actions have effectively set Lebanon back a hundred years, if not more." This came just a few days before the government meeting scheduled to approve the executive mechanism to implement the "state monopoly over arms". Meaning disarmament of Hezbollah.

==== Hezbollah's Secretary-General Naim Qassem ====
Naim Qassem made it clear that Hezbollah will not give up its weapons as long as Israel continues its attacks. He rejected U.S. proposals, calling them a form of "surrender," and said disarmament would only be possible after Israel fully withdraws from southern Lebanon. On 30 July 2025, the day marking the first anniversary of the targeted killing by Israel of senior commander Fuad Shukr, he spoke about the fact that Hezbollah still maintains its power as the resistance in Lebanon, denying the notion of disarmament. In a statement on 15 August 2025, he vowed there would be no disarmament of Hezbollah and gave a clear warning that an attempt to confront Hezbollah would mean "no life" for Lebanon.

==== Mahmoud Qamati ====
Mahmoud Qamati, the Deputy Head of Hezbollah’s Political Council, has expressed several times his firm stance against the disarmament of Hezbollah. In 2025, he rejected the idea of disarmament, saying it is part of the "national defense needs". In a 2026 interview, he criticized the Lebanese government's decision to ban the group’s activities and confiscate its weapons.

==== Walid Jumblatt ====
Walid Jumblatt is one of the notable voices for the disarmament of Hezbollah, saying that Hezbollah must "realize that keeping its weapons and missiles serves no purpose."

=== International ===
- France: France supports Hezbollah's disarmament. It has pressed the Lebanese government to move ahead with disarmament efforts more forcefully.
- Germany: Germany calls for Hezbollah's disarmament in Lebanon in accordance with UN Resolution 1701, advocating for the consolidation of weapons under Lebanese state control to ensure regional security and stability.
- Iran: Foreign Minister Abbas Araghchi said this was not the first time attempts have been made to disarm Hezbollah, adding, "We act as a supporter but we do not interfere in their decision-making."
- Israel: Israel views Hezbollah's disarmament as a security necessity. Israeli Prime Minister Benjamin Netanyahu welcomed Lebanon's plan to disarm Hezbollah as a "momentous decision."
- Syria: President Ahmed al-Sharaa said that he supports Lebanon's efforts to disarm Hezbollah, adding that Syria's position remains "firm in condemning all forms of aggression against Arab sovereignty."
- United States: The U.S. has been a primary proponent of Hezbollah's disarmament, welcoming Lebanon's decision to bring all weapons under state control. U.S. envoy Tom Barrack described the development as "historic."

== Phase 2 ==
Since the first phase regarding the disarmament of Hezbollah is coming to an end, the Ceasefire Monitoring Committee will start a meeting in Naqoura. The meeting will be attended by representatives from the United States, France, Lebanon, Israel and the United Nations Interim Force in Lebanon (UNIFIL). The meeting will focus on implementing Phase 2 of the road map to the disarmament of Hezbollah.

== See also ==
- Disarmament
- Hezbollah armed strength
- Middle East nuclear weapon free zone
