= Haql El Aazimeh =

Village in the Miniyeh-Danniyeh District in the North Governorate of Lebanon

Haql El Aazimeh حقل العزيمة
- Location within Lebanon
- Coordinates: 34°23′55″N 36°01′05″E
- Country: Lebanon
- Governorate: North Governorate
- Districts of Lebanon: Miniyeh-Danniyeh District

Area
  - Total: 0.55 km^{2} (0.21 sq mi)
- Time zone: +2
  - Summer (DST): +3

Haql El Aazimeh (Arabic: حقل العزيمة, romanized: Ḥaql el-ʿAzīmeh) is a village located in the Miniyeh-Danniyeh District, in the North Governorate of Lebanon. It had 1,253 eligible voters in the 2009 elections, and the residents belonged to the Greek Orthodox Church.

== History ==
In 1838, Eli Smith noted the village as Hakl el-'Azimeh, located in the Ed-Dunniyeh area.

== Demographics ==
In 2014, Christians made up 99.71% of registered voters in Haql El Aazimeh. 93.64% of the voters were Greek Orthodox.

== Bibliography ==
- Robinson, E.; Smith, E. (1841). Biblical Researches in Palestine, Mount Sinai and Arabia Petraea: A Journal of Travels in the year 1838. Vol. 3. Boston: Crocker & Brewster.
