= Saadeh Al Shami =

Lebanese economist, academic and politician

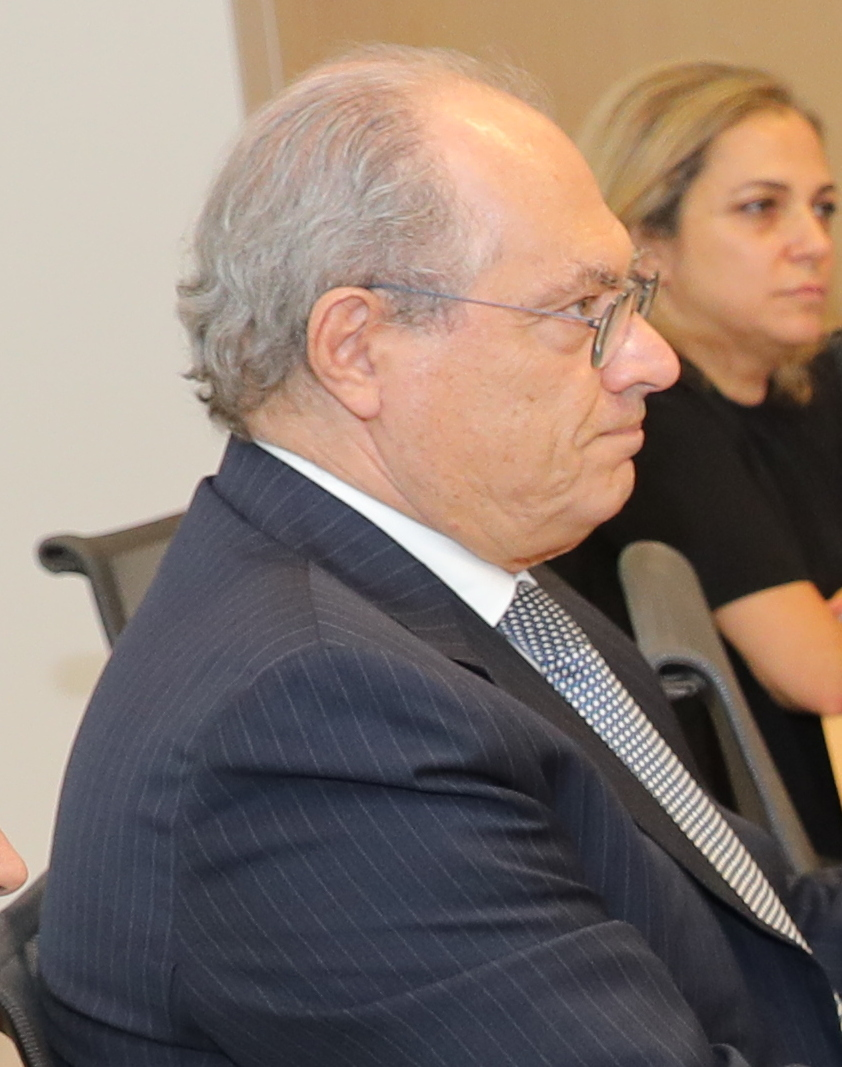
- Al Shami in 2022

Deputy Prime Minister of Lebanon
- In office 10 September 2021 – 8 February 2025
- President: Michel Aoun; Joseph Aoun
- Prime Minister: Najib Mikati
- Preceded by: Zeina Akar
- Succeeded by: Tarek Mitri

Personal details
- Born: 14 April 1954 (age 71)
- Party: Syrian Social Nationalist Party (former)
- Cabinet: Third Cabinet of Najib Mikati

Saadeh Al Shami (Arabic: سعادة الشامي; born 14 April 1954) is a Lebanese economist, academic and politician who served as the deputy prime minister of Lebanon in the cabinet led by Najib Mikati from 2021 to 2025.

== Biography ==
Al Shami hails from a Lebanese Greek Orthodox family. He was born on 14 April 1954.

From 1987 to 1993 Al Shami was the head of the graduate school of business at the American University of Beirut. He worked at the Lebanese premiership and the finance ministry as a head of the reform commission between 2005 and 2006. Then from 2008 to 2013 he worked at the International Monetary Fund in different positions, including the assistant to the director of the Middle East and Central Asia department. Al Shami also served as the head of Capital Markets Authority in Lebanon between 2013 and 2017. In 2018 he began to work as the group chief economist at the National Bank of Kuwait.

He was a member of the Syrian Social Nationalist Party. In the proposed cabinet by Saad Hariri in July 2021 Al Shami was named as the minister of economy, but the cabinet was not approved by the Lebanese Parliament. He was appointed deputy prime minister of Lebanon in the cabinet formed by Prime Minister Najib Mikati on 10 September 2021.

In April 2022 Shami announced that the Banque du Liban, central bank of Lebanon, went bankrupt: "The state has gone bankrupt as did the Banque du Liban, and the loss has occurred, and we will seek to reduce losses for the people."

Political offices
Preceded by Zeina Akar	Deputy Prime Minister of Lebanon; 2021–2025	Succeeded by Tarek Mitri
