= Fadi Makki =

Lebanese economist and politician

- فادي مكي
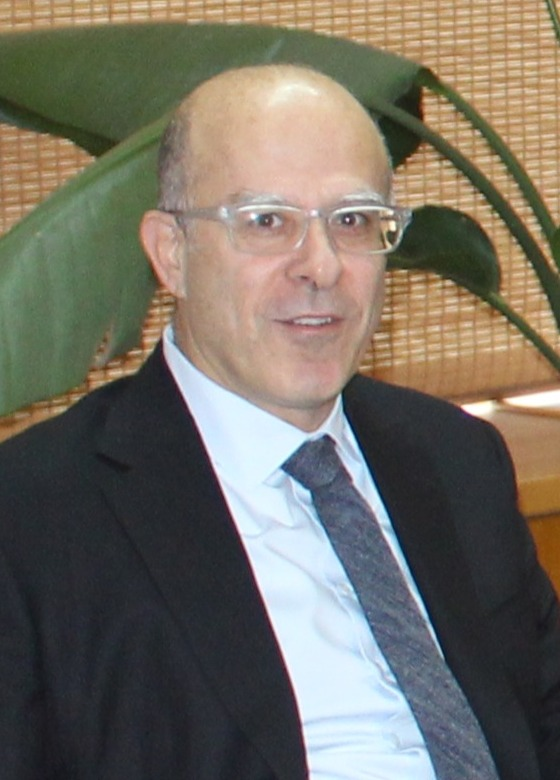
- Makki in 2025
- Born: September 1968 (age 57)
- Education: American University of Beirut (BA); University of Hull (MA); London School of Economics (MSc); University of Cambridge (PhD)
- Occupations: Economist; politician; consultant
- Employers: Boston Consulting Group; Ministry of Economy and Trade
- Known for: Behavioral economics in public policy; Founder of Nudge Lebanon; Founder of B4Development
- Office: Minister of State for Administrative Reform (Lebanon)

Fadi Makki (Arabic: فادي مكّي; born September 1968) is a pioneer in the application of behavioural economics to public policy in the Middle East, where he led a large number of RCTs in policy areas such as healthy life style, compliance and rule of law, sustainability, education and workers' welfare. He was appointed in the government of Prime Minister Nawaf Salam in February 2025 as Minister for Administrative Reform.

Before that he was Partner & Director at the Boston Consulting Group in Washington DC co-leading their Behavioral Science Lab.

He founded the first nudge unit in the Middle East, Qatar's Behavioural Insights Unit (QBIU), within the Supreme Committee for Delivery & Legacy, and is founder of Nudge Lebanon and the Consumer-Citizen Lab. He was Senior Fellow at Georgetown Qatar and Senior Public Policy Fellow at the American University of Beirut’s Issam Fares Institute of Public Policy. He was also adjunct professor at Hamad Bin Khalifa University and visiting lecturer at AUB where he teaches behavioural economics and policy.

He was between 2020 and 2024, member, then Co-Chair of the World Health Organization's (WHO) Technical and Advisory Group on Behavioral Insights for Health and has served between 2016 and 2018 as member of the Council for Behavioral Sciences at the World Economic Forum.

He was advisor to the Prime Minister of Lebanon on economy and trade as well as Director General of the Lebanese Ministry of Economy and Trade from 2002 to the end of 2005. He also worked for Booz & Company, Cisco, as well as the Qatar National Food Security Program. He was the Advisor to the Qatari Ministry of Finance, Economy and Commerce where he advised Qatar on trade policy and the World Trade Organization (WTO), and was part of the committee that organized the 4th WTO ministerial conference which led to the launch of the Doha round in November 2001. He was visiting lecturer and fellow at Cambridge University and the Graduate Institute in Geneva.

His academic background spans International trade and development, international law, public and business administration, behavioural economics and public policy, with a PhD from Cambridge University in the United Kingdom, masters from the London School of Economics and Hull University, BAs from the American University of Beirut and the Lebanese University Law School.

Fadi studied at the University of Cambridge. His PhD dissertation, which was approved in 1997, is titled 'Financial services in the World Trade Organization (WTO) and the General Agreement on Trade in Services (GATS): development towards the rule of law.'
