= Ministry of Tourism (Lebanon) =

Government ministry of Lebanon

Coordinates: 33°53′42″N 35°29′18″E

Lebanese Republic Ministry of Tourism وزارة السياحة

Agency overview
- Jurisdiction: Government of Lebanon
- Headquarters: Beirut (Lebanon)
- Agency executive: Laura Khazen Lahoud, Minister of tourism
- Website: Official website

The Ministry of Tourism (Arabic: وزارة السياحة) is a government ministry of Lebanon. It originates from the Lebanon Tourism Service created in the 1930s as part of the Ministry of National Economy.

== History ==
After Lebanese independence, the General Tourism Commission (CGT or Commissariat Général du Tourisme, de l'Estivage et de l'Hivernage in French) was created in 1948 to monitor tourism professions and promote Lebanese tourism abroad.

In 1959, the CGT was annexed by the Ministry of Information which became the Ministry of Information, Orientation, and Tourism. However, it was the National Tourism Council (CNT or Conseil National du Tourisme in French), a private organization, which effectively promoted tourism in Lebanon.

The growth of tourism on a global scale led to the creation of the Ministry of Tourism in 1966 (Law 21/66, issued on March 29, 1966), composed of the General Directorate of Tourism (Direction Générale des Affaires Touristiques).

Decree no. 7142 was issued on April 20, 1967, defining the specific tasks that fell under the separate responsibility of the National Tourism Council, including overseas promotion and execution of tourism projects. However, this decree was repealed by Decree no. 2829, issued on October 10, 1992, which transferred these tasks to the Ministry of Tourism.

== Minister ==
The current minister of tourism is Laura Khazen Lahoud.

== See also ==
- Tourism in Lebanon
