= Ministry of Environment (Lebanon) =

Government ministry of Lebanon

The Ministry of Environment is the government ministry, part of the Lebanese cabinet.

== History and profile ==
The ministry was established in 1992 under Law 216/93.

It is responsible for the environment of Lebanon. More specifically, it deals with the protection of the environment in general, setting regulations and standards, and provides advice on the productive use of implementing projects and programme in a sustainable manner.
