= Ministry of Information (Lebanon) =

Government ministry of Lebanon

Lebanese Republic Ministry of Information

Agency overview
- Jurisdiction: Government of Lebanon
- Headquarters: Beyrouth, Lebanon
- Minister responsible: Paul Morcos, Minister of Information
- Website: Official website

The Ministry of Information is the ministry responsible for the distribution of information in Lebanon.

== List of Information ministers ==
Minister	Term of office	
Bassem Sabeh	Nov 1996	Dec 1998
Ghazi Aridi	28 Oct 2000	2003
Ghazi Aridi	19 Jul 2005	2008
Melhem Antoun Riachy	18 Dec 2016	6 May 2018
Jamal Al-Jarrah	31 Jan 2019	21 Jan 2020
Manal Abdel Samad	21 Jan 2020	09 Aug 2020
George Kurdahi	10 Sep 2021	03 Dec 2021
Abbas Halabi	03 Dec 2021	10 Mar 2022
Ziad Makary	10 Mar 2022	08 Feb 2025
Paul Morcos	08 Feb 2025	Incumbent
