= Nawaf Salam =

Prime Minister of Lebanon since 2025

- نوّاف سلام
- Salam in 2026

53rd Prime Minister of Lebanon
- Incumbent
- Assumed office 8 February 2025
- President: Joseph Aoun
- Deputy: Tarek Mitri
- Preceded by: Najib Mikati

President of the International Court of Justice
- In office 6 February 2024 – 14 January 2025
- Vice President: Julia Sebutinde
- Preceded by: Joan Donoghue
- Succeeded by: Yuji Iwasawa

Judge of the International Court of Justice
- In office 6 February 2018 – 14 January 2025
- Preceded by: Christopher Greenwood
- Succeeded by: Mahmoud Daifallah Hmoud
Other positions held
Permanent representative of Lebanon to the United Nations
In office
13 July 2007 – 15 December 2017
Vice President of the United Nations General Assembly
In office
1 September 2012 – 31 August 2013
President of the United Nations Security Council
In office
1 September 2011 – 30 September 2011
In office
1 May 2010 – 31 May 2010

Personal details
- Born: Nawaf Abdallah Salim Salam; 15 December 1953 (age 72) Beirut, Lebanon
- Party: Independent
- Spouse: Sahar Baassiri
- Children: 2
- Relatives: Salim Ali Salam (grandfather); Saeb Salam (uncle); Anbara Salam Khalidi (aunt); Tammam Salam (cousin); Walid Khalidi (cousin); Tarif Khalidi (cousin); Usama Khalidi (cousin)
- Education: Collège protestant français Harvard University (LLM); Sciences Po (PhD); Sorbonne University (PhD)
- Occupation: International judge; diplomat; academic; politician
- Website: Official X

Nawaf Abdallah Salim Salam (Arabic: نوّاف عبد الله سليم سلام; born 15 December 1953) is a Lebanese politician, diplomat, jurist, and academic who has been serving as the 53rd prime minister of Lebanon since 8 February 2025. Salam previously sat on the International Court of Justice (ICJ) for a nine-year term beginning in 2018, and additionally served as Lebanon's ambassador and permanent representative to the United Nations in New York from 2007 to 2017, during which time he held the positions of president of the Security Council and vice president of the General Assembly. In 2024, he was elected the 27th president of the ICJ, becoming the second Arab and the first Lebanese judge to hold the office. He resigned from the court after the parliament of Lebanon nominated him as prime minister.

== Background and education ==
Son of Abdallah Salam and Reckat Beyhum, Nawaf was born into a prominent Sunni Muslim family from Beirut, Lebanon. His grandfather, Salim Salam, the leader of the "Beirut Reform Movement", which had called for the decentralization and modernization of the Ottoman Empire, was elected deputy of Beirut to the Ottoman parliament in 1912. His uncle, Saeb Salam, fought for Lebanon's independence from the French and subsequently served four times as Prime Minister of Lebanon between 1952 and 1973. His cousin Tammam Salam was Prime Minister of Lebanon between 2014 and 2016.

Salam holds a Doctorate in Political Science from the Sciences Po (1992), a Master of Laws (LL.M.) from Harvard Law School (1991), and a Doctorate in History from the Sorbonne (1979).

== Career ==
=== Legal practice and academia ===
From 1979 to 1981, Salam was a lecturer on the contemporary history of the Middle East at Sorbonne University. In 1981, he left Paris to spend an academic year as a visiting scholar at the Weatherhead Center for International Affairs at Harvard University. Between 1985 and 1989, he was a lecturer at the American University of Beirut, during which time he also practiced law as an associate at Takla Law Firm. He was a visiting researcher at Harvard Law School from 1989 to 1990, and a foreign legal consultant at Edwards & Angell LLP from 1989 to 1992. He resumed his practice at the Takla Law Firm in 1992 as well as his teaching of International Law and International Relations at the American University of Beirut. He was appointed visiting associate professor of political science in 2003, and later associate professor of political science in 2005. From 2005 to 2007, he was the chairman of the Political Studies and Public Administration Department.

=== Public interest work ===
Salam served as a member of the Executive Bureau of the Economic and Social Council of Lebanon from 1999 to 2002 and as a member of the Lebanese National Commission of UNESCO from 2000 to 2004. In 2005 and 2006, he was Secretary General of The National Commission on Electoral Reform, which was entrusted with the task of preparing the draft of a new electoral law for Lebanon. He has also served on the board of trustees of the Lebanese Center for Policy Studies (LCPS), a non-partisan think tank whose mission is to produce and advocate policies that improve governance in Lebanon and the Arab world.

=== Ambassador of Lebanon to the United Nations ===
From July 2007 to December 2017, he served as Lebanon's ambassador and permanent representative to the United Nations in New York.

Salam's mandate at the UN was marked by his repeated interventions before the Security Council calling for security and stability in South Lebanon through the implementation of United Nations Security Council Resolution 1701, promoting the establishment of an independent Security Forces to protect civilians from Ambassador of Lebanon to the United Nations policy of "disassociation" from the Syrian conflict, and seeking an end to impunity through the establishment of the Special Tribunal for Lebanon in the matter of the assassination of former Lebanese prime minister Rafic Hariri pursuant to United Nations Security Council resolution 1757.

He represented Lebanon on the Security Council in 2010 and 2011, for Lebanon's two-year term as a non-permanent member. In May 2010 and September 2011, he held the rotating Presidency of the Security Council.

He served as vice-president of the 67th session of the General Assembly of the United Nations from September 2012 to September 2013 and as acting president of the General Assembly of the United Nations in July 2013.

=== Judge of the International Court of Justice ===
On 9 November 2017, Salam was elected judge of the International Court of Justice (ICJ) after receiving 135 votes in the United Nations General Assembly and 12 votes in the Security Council. After Fouad Ammoun, he became the second Lebanese to serve as a judge of the ICJ.

On 6 February 2024, he was elected as the president of the ICJ. Salam's appointment as President of the ICJ in February 2024 coincided directly with the first hearing on South Africa's genocide lawsuit against Israel in January 2024. Salam took over the case brought by South Africa against Israel.

=== Candidacy for Prime Minister ===
Salam was a candidate for Prime minister towards the end of Michel Aoun's term to replace Najib Mikati in 2022. However, Mikati won again, becoming prime minister designate on 23 June 2022 with 54 votes against Salam's 28 to form a new cabinet for the remainder of President Michel Aoun's term.

In the wake of the election of Joseph Aoun as president of Lebanon on 9 January 2025, multiple opposition MPs reached a consensus on nominating Salam as prime minister. His candidacy was supported by many Western and Arab states, who called for his nomination, against current caretaker prime minister Najib Mikati. On 13 January 2025, Salam was nominated by 84 out of 128 MPs, making him the Prime Minister-designate of Lebanon. He flew to Lebanon on 14 January after departure from The Hague. That very day, he stepped down as a member of the International Court of Justice.

== Premiership (2025–present) ==
Salam stated his intent to avoid exclusion and to promote unity across the political spectrum, especially after Hezbollah's parliamentary leader Mohammad Raad stated that Hezbollah had "extended its hand" by helping to secure Aoun's election, but found that "hand cut off." He accused the opposition of fragmentation and exclusion from power in Lebanon. Salam also pledged to extend and impose the authority of the Lebanese state across its entire territory, in line with the U.N. Resolution 1701. He vowed to reopen the investigation of the Beirut port explosion and proposed engaging with international partners, an investigation that officially resumed on 16 January 2025.

Salam's cabinet was confirmed by President Joseph Aoun on 8 February 2025.

Salam emphasized In his inaugural televised interview the need for comprehensive reforms in order to restore citizens' trust in the Lebanese state. He highlighted the importance of restructuring the banking sector to attract investments and safeguard deposits, asserting that a robust banking system is essential for economic growth. Salam also called for serious efforts toward establishing an independent judiciary, stating that without it, there can be no protection for freedoms, guarantee of rights, or encouragement of investments. He underscored that judicial independence is the cornerstone of both financial and political reforms. Additionally, Salam advocated for the full implementation of the Taif Agreement, particularly administrative decentralization, warning that delays have exacerbated national crises. He reaffirmed his commitment to implementing U.N. Security Council Resolution 1701, emphasizing the state's exclusive authority over weapons and security matters. Addressing the financial crisis, Salam rejected any solutions that would involve writing off citizens' deposits, emphasizing the need to protect depositors' rights. He concluded by expressing his intent to engage with international partners to support Lebanon's reform and recovery efforts. On 26 February, Salam's government won a confidence vote in parliament.

On the 50th anniversary of the Lebanese Civil War, he called for national reflection and a renewed commitment to building a unified state. In a message shared on X (formerly Twitter), he emphasized that all factions were ultimately losers in the conflict and highlighted the absence or failure of the state as a central cause. Salam advocated for the full implementation of the Taif Agreement, correcting misapplications and closing loopholes, and stressed the importance of legitimate armed forces holding exclusive rights to bear arms. He also urged the state to address the issue of missing and kidnapped individuals with seriousness and transparency. To commemorate the anniversary, Salam called for a nationwide moment of silence at noon on 13 April, under the slogan: "We remember together to rebuild together."

During the visit of the secretary of Iran's Supreme National Security Council, Ali Larijani, Salam said that recent comments from Iranian officials Abbas Araghchi and Ali Akbar Velayati clearly broke normal diplomatic rules and showed no respect for Lebanon's independence. On 15 August 2025, in response to the statement of Naim Qassem he said there is only one government that makes decisions in Lebanon, there is no state that doesn't have arms monopoly and addressing Qassems threat of civil war he said "The implicit or direct threat of civil war, I believe that none of the Lebanese today, ... none of the Lebanese, young and old, men and women, in the south or in the north, wherever they are, none of them wants to return to civil war today".

On 5 September 2025 he declared that the cabinet welcomes the army's plan for weapons state control, focusing on the disarmament of Hezbollah.

On 20 November 2025 he declared Lebanon's readiness to engage with Israel in order to solve land border disputes and agree on an Israeli withdrawal from the areas retained after its war with Hezbollah the year prior.

=== 2026 Lebanon War ===
Following the 2026 Israeli–United States strikes on Iran, Salam urged restraint, stressing that Lebanon must not be dragged into a wider regional war and should prioritize its own security and stability. On 2 March, he ordered a ban on military activities by Hezbollah. On 5 March 2026, it was announced that all activity of the Iranian IRGC in Lebanon is banned. In addition, it was decided that Iranians now require a visa to enter Lebanon.

In an interview to Asharq Al-Awsat he addressed the 2026 Lebanon war, saying “We could have avoided being impacted by the conflict were it not for the strategic error committed by Hezbollah by being dragged us into it,” In an interview to L’Orient-Le Jour Salam said "We are open to discussing any formula related to negotiations with Israel".

On a March 2026 interview to CNN Salam said he is willing to enter immediate and direct negotiations with Israel, to end the war in Lebanon. In an interview to Saudi Arabia's Al-Hadath Salam said Iranian IRGC is directing Hezbollah in its war on Israel and that this war was imposed on Lebanon. "These were the Revolutionary Guards, who are present and, unfortunately, managing military operations in Lebanon ...These people have fake passports and entered the country illegally,”. He mentioned again the government's unprecedented decision to ban Hezbollah's military actions, calling them to disarm and hand their weapons to the state.

On 26 March 2026, Salam spoke with UN Secretary-General António Guterres regarding the expansion of Israel's ground operations in southern Lebanon. During the call, Salam stated that Israeli actions threatened Lebanon’s sovereignty and violated international law and the UN Charter. He further announced that Lebanon would file a formal complaint with the UN Security Council. Salam warned the United Nations of the 'risk of annexation' of Lebanese territory south of the Litani River by Israel.

On 12 April 2026, he addressed the nation with a speech for the 1975 Civil war commemoration. He stated that the country must stay unified, not fall to civil war again and must embrace Aoun's initiative for direct peace talks with Israel while implementing the Taif agreement.

Nawaf Salam said on May 6th that Lebanon is on the road to peace with Israel, while emphasizing the importance to restrict weapons to state control, according to the "Nation Shield" plan.

== Personal life ==
Salam is married to Sahar Baassiri, columnist and Lebanon's former ambassador to UNESCO. He has two sons, Abdallah from his previous marriage to artist and activist Nada Sehnaoui, and Marwan from his marriage to Sahar Baassiri. The Associated Press describes him as "a member of a prominent Sunni Muslim family from Beirut." Under the 1943 National Pact, the prime minister of Lebanon is always selected from the Sunni community.

Aside from his native Arabic, Salam is fluent in English and French.

In a 2025 press conference with Middle East Airlines, it was revealed that Salam, an aviation enthusiast, had a private pilot license and used to fly planes as a hobby.

== Decorations ==
Salam was awarded in 2012 the French Legion of Honour (Légion d'honneur) at the rank of Officer (Officier) by President Nicolas Sarkozy.

== Notable publications ==
Salam has written books and articles on political and constitutional reform, electoral law reform, overcoming sectarianism, fighting corruption, as well as on promoting accountability through strengthening the rule of law and the independence of the judiciary. He has also written on the issue of citizenship and civil society in the Arab world as well as on the development of international law.

=== Books and booklets ===
- Editor and Contributor: Lebanon in the Security Council, 2010-2011 (in Arabic), Dar Al Saqi, Beirut, 2013 ISBN 978-1-85516-970-8
- Editor and Contributor: Le Moyen-Orient à l'Epreuve de l'Irak, Actes-Sud/Sindbad, Paris, 2005. ISBN 2-7427-5249-8
- Editor and Contributor: Options for Lebanon, I.B.Tauris, London and New York, 2004. ISBN 1-85043-928-1 (Arabic version published by Dar An-Nahar ISBN 9953-10-003-9).
- Co-editor with Theodor Hanf and Contributor: Lebanon in Limbo, Nomos, Baden-Baden, 2003. ISBN 3-8329-0310-0
- Co-editor with Fares Sassine, Lebanon. A Century in Pictures (Trilingual English-French-Arabic), Dar An-Nahar, Beirut, 2003. ISBN 2-84289-286-0
- Civil Society in the Arab World: The Historical and Political Dimensions, Islamic Legal Studies Program, Harvard Law School, Occasional Publications, Cambridge, 2002. ISBN 0-88086-050-2
- La condition libanaise. Communautés, citoyen, Etat; suivi de: La citoyenneté en pays d'Islam. Dar An-Nahar, Beirut, 1998. (2nd ed. 2001). ISBN 2-84289-099-X
- Mythes et Politiques au Liban. Trois Essais, Fiches du Monde Arabe, Beirut, 1987.
- Prospects for Lebanon. An Essay on Political Opportunities and Constraints, C.L.S., Oxford, 1987. ISBN 1-870552-06-7

Legal offices
Preceded by Christopher Greenwood	Judge of the International Court of Justice; 2018–2024	Vacant
Preceded by Joan Donoghue	President of the International Court of Justice; 2024–2025	Succeeded by Yuji Iwasawa
Political offices
Preceded by Najib Mikati	Prime Minister of Lebanon; 2025–present	Incumbent
