= Strong Republic (Lebanon) =

Lebanese political bloc

Strong Republic الجمهورية القوية
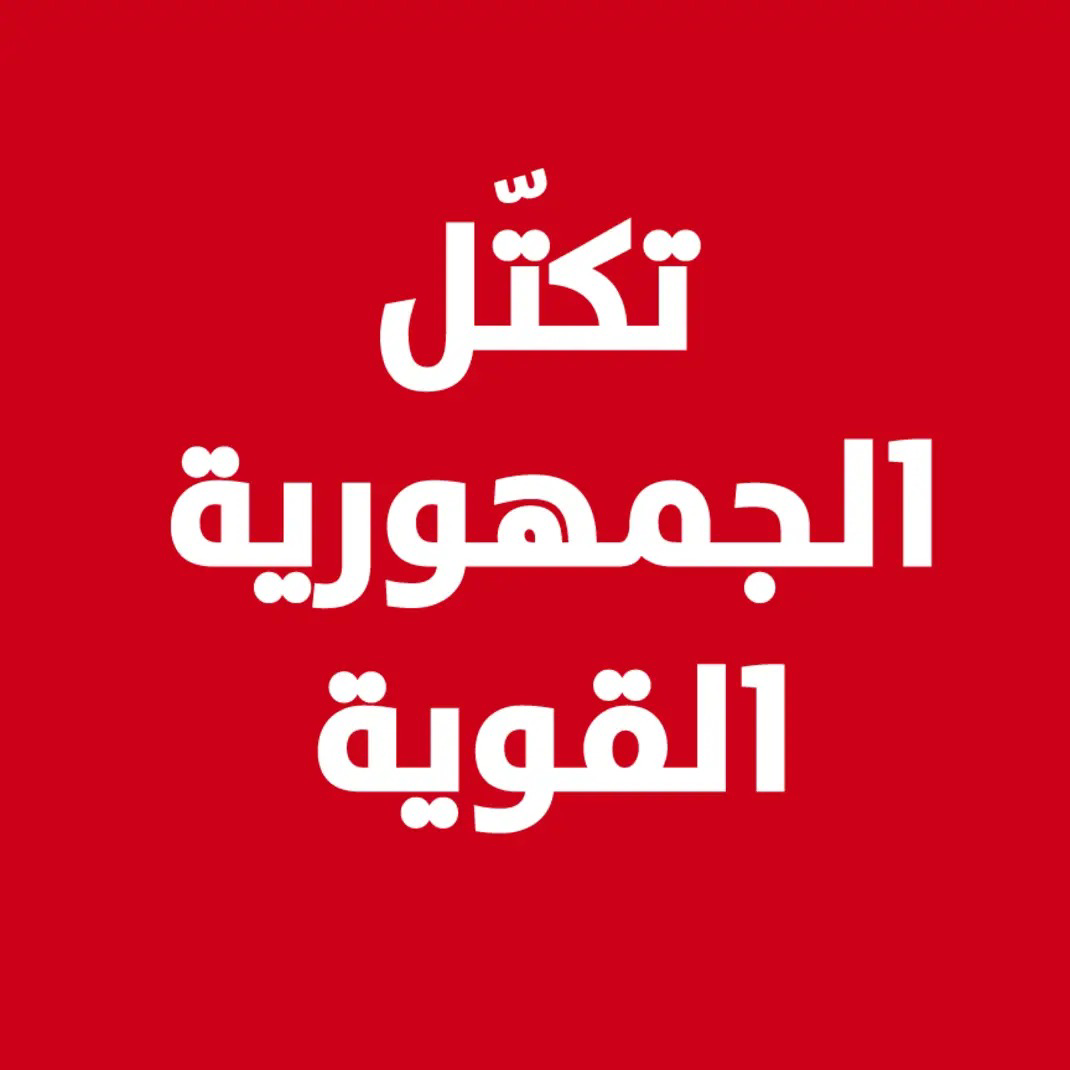
- Legislature(s): Parliament of Lebanon
- Foundation: 21 June 2005
- Member parties: Lebanese Forces; National Liberal Party
- President: Samir Geagea
- Constituency: North Lebanon: North II; North III; Mount Lebanon: Mount Lebanon I; Mount Lebanon II; Mount Lebanon III; Mount Lebanon IV; Beirut: Beirut I; Bekaa: Bekaa I; Bekaa III; South Lebanon: South I
- General secretary: Emile Moukarzel
- Representation: 19 / 128 (15%)
- Ideology: Sovereigntism; Nationalism
- Website: The Strong Republic Bloc official page

Strong Republic (Arabic: الجمهورية القوية) is the parliamentary bloc of the Lebanese Forces in the Lebanese Parliament. It is headed by member of parliament and vice president of the Lebanese Forces party Georges Adwan. The bloc has been made up of 19 MPs since the 2022 general election making it the largest bloc in the Lebanese Parliament.

== Election summary ==
Election	Seats	Change
2005	6 / 128 (5%)	New
2009	8 / 128 (6%)	▲2
2018	15 / 128 (12%)	▲7
2022	19 / 128 (15%)	▲4

== 2005–2009 session deputies ==
Name	Election Area	Political Affiliation	Sect
Farid Habib	Koura	Lebanese Forces	Greek Orthodox
Antoine Zahra	Batroun	Lebanese Forces	Maronite
Sethrida Tawk	Bsharri	Lebanese Forces	Maronite
Elie Keyrouz	Bsharri	Lebanese Forces	Maronite
Georges Adwan	Chouf	Lebanese Forces	Maronite
Edmond Naim	Baabda	Independent	Maronite

== 2009–2018 session deputies ==
Name	Election Area	Political Affiliation	Sect
Farid Habib	Koura	Lebanese Forces	Greek Orthodox
Antoine Zahra	Batroun	Lebanese Forces	Maronite
Sethrida Geagea	Bsharri	Lebanese Forces	Maronite
Elie Keyrouz	Bsharri	Lebanese Forces	Maronite
Georges Adwan	Chouf	Lebanese Forces	Maronite
Tony Abou Khater	Zahle	Lebanese Forces	Greek Catholic
Shant Chinchinian	Zahle	Lebanese Forces	Armenian Orthodox
Joseph Maalouf	Zahle	Lebanese Forces	Greek Orthodox

== 2018–2022 session deputies ==
Name	Election Area	Political Affiliation	Sect
Imad Wakim	Beirut I	Lebanese Forces	Greek Orthodox
Wehbe Katicha	Akkar	Lebanese Forces	Greek Orthodox
Fady Saad	Batroun	Lebanese Forces	Maronite
Sethrida Tawk	Bsharri	Lebanese Forces	Maronite
Joseph Ishac	Bsharri	Lebanese Forces	Maronite
Ziad Hawat	Byblos	Independent	Maronite
Chawki Daccache	Keserwan	Lebanese Forces	Maronite
Eddy Abillammaa	Metn	Lebanese Forces	Maronite
Pierre Bou Assi	Baabda	Lebanese Forces	Maronite
Anis Nassar	Aley	Lebanese Forces	Greek Orthodox
Georges Adwan	Chouf	Lebanese Forces	Maronite
Georges Okeis	Zahle	Lebanese Forces	Greek Catholic
Antoine Habchi	Baalbeck Hermel	Lebanese Forces	Maronite
~~Jean Talouzian~~ Expelled in October 2020	Beirut I	Independent	Armenian Catholic
~~Cesar Maalouf~~ Expelled in August 2021	Zahle	Independent	Greek Orthodox

== 2022–2026 session deputies ==
Name	Election Area	Political Affiliation	Sect
Ghassan Hasbani	Beirut 1	Lebanese Forces	Greek Orthodox
Jihad Pakradouni	Beirut 1	Independent	Armenian Orthodox
Elias Khoury	North 2 - Tripoli	Lebanese Forces	Maronite
Fadi Karam	North 3 - Koura	Lebanese Forces	Greek Orthodox
Sethrida Geagea	North 3 - Bsharri	Lebanese Forces	Maronite
Ghayath Yazbeck	North 3 - Batroun	Lebanese Forces	Maronite
Ziad Hawat	Mount Lebanon 1 - Jbeil	Independent	Maronite
Chawki Daccache	Mount Lebanon 1 - Kesserwan	Lebanese Forces	Maronite
Melhem Riachy	Mount Lebanon 2 - Metn	Lebanese Forces	Greek Catholic
Razi El Hage	Mount Lebanon 2 - Metn	Independent	Maronite
Pierre Bou Assi	Mount Lebanon 3 - Baabda	Lebanese Forces	Maronite
Camille Dory Chamoun	Mount Lebanon 3 - Baabda	National Liberal Party	Maronite
Nazih Matta	Mount Lebanon 4 - Aley	Lebanese Forces	Greek Orthodox
Georges Adwan	Mount Lebanon 4 - Chouf	Lebanese Forces	Maronite
Ghada Ayoub	South 1 - Jezzine	Independent	Greek Catholic
Said Asmar	South 1 - Jezzine	Lebanese Forces	Maronite
Elias Estephan	Bekaa 1 - Zahle	Lebanese Forces	Greek Orthodox
Georges Okais	Bekaa 1 - Zahle	Lebanese Forces	Greek Catholic
Antoine Habchi	Bekaa 3 - Baalbek-Hermel	Lebanese Forces	Maronite

== List of draft laws proposed in parliament ==
Date	MP	Name	Detail
02-06-2012	Elie Keyrouz	abolish death penalty in Lebanon	The death penalty should be eliminated in all instances within Lebanese legislation, particularly in the Penal Code and the Military Penal Code. Instead, it should be substituted with the punishment of life imprisonment with hard labor or life imprisonment, depending on the nature and circumstances of the committed crime.
29-07-2016	Elie Keyrouz	abolish Lebanese rape-marriage law Article 522	Introducing a law to abolish Article 522 of the Lebanese Penal Code, which allows the perpetrator of crimes of assault on honor to escape prosecution if he marries the victim.
02-08-2023	Melhem Riachi, Georges Okeis	Legalize optional civil marriage in Lebanon	The couple is free to choose any municipality for their marriage ceremony, as long as the municipality has at least 15 members. Their marriage will be legally recognized and governed by the court within the same jurisdiction. Non-Lebanese have the right to contract a civil marriage on Lebanese territory in accordance with this law.

== Bloc events summary ==
=== 2005 Bloc ===
The bloc refused to vote for Nabih Berri in the 2005 Speaker of the Lebanese Parliament election.

On 23 January 2006, MP Edmond Naim died.

=== 2009 Bloc ===
The bloc refused to vote for Nabih Berri in the 2009 Speaker of the Lebanese Parliament election.

On May 31, 2012, MP Farid Habib died.

On July 15, 2012, LF candidate Fadi Karam won the by-elections to fill the seat of late Farid Habib.

On April 4, 2014, the bloc nominated party leader Samir Geagea for the 2014 Lebanese presidential election.

In 2016, the bloc proposed a law that protects women and other family members from domestic violence.

=== 2018 Bloc ===
Members of the bloc refused to vote for Nabih Berri in the 2018 Speaker of the Lebanese Parliament election for the exception of Cesar Maalouf who was later expelled from the bloc on August 20, 2021.

On August 31, 2020, the Strong Republic bloc named Nawaf Salam to form the government as Prime Minister.

On October 22, 2020, MP Jean Talouzian was expelled from the bloc when he nominated Saad Hariri to be elected as Prime Minister unlike the rest of the Strong Republic bloc.

=== 2022 Bloc ===
The bloc refused to vote for Nabih Berri in the 2022 Speaker of the Lebanese Parliament election, and had its MPs write "the strong republic" on their papers.

On July 19, 2022, MP Razi El-Hage proposed a law to adopt the majority system in municipal elections.

On September 14, 2022, LF boycotted the parliament session due to the memorial of Bachir Gemayel‘s assassination.

The Strong Republic bloc initially endorsed Michel Moawad for the 2022–2025 Lebanese presidential election. The bloc's second endorsement was Jihad Azour.

== Bloc allies ==
- Democratic Gathering
- Kataeb party
- Renewal Bloc

== See also ==
- List of members of the 2005–2009 Lebanese Parliament
- List of members of the 2009–2017 Lebanese Parliament
- List of members of the 2018–2022 Lebanese Parliament
- List of members of the 2022–2026 Lebanese Parliament
