= Third cabinet of Saad Hariri =

Current government of Lebanon

Third Cabinet of Saad Hariri
- Cabinet of Lebanon

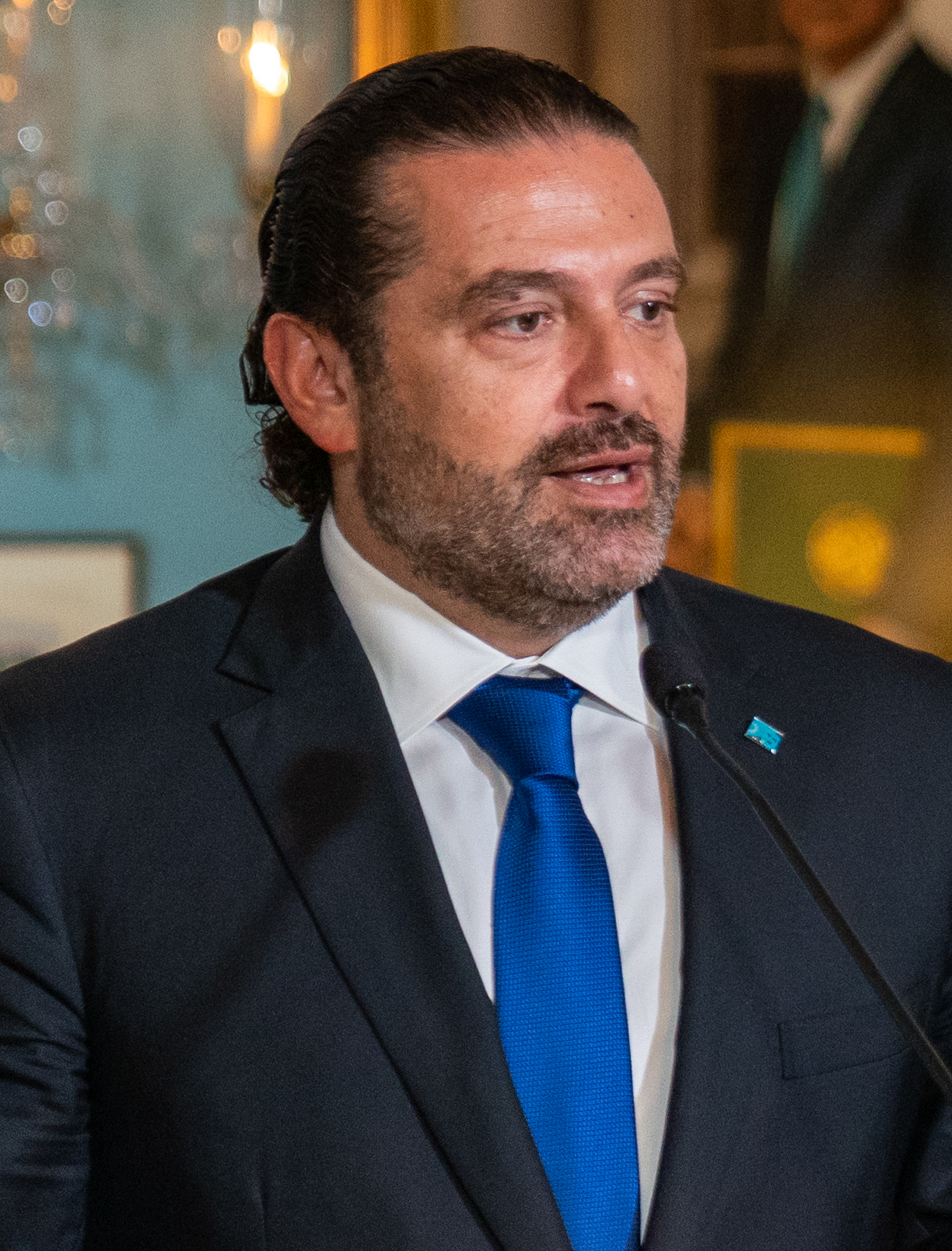
- Saad Hariri
- Date formed: 30 January 2019
- Date dissolved: 21 January 2020

People and organisations
- President: Michel Aoun
- Head of government: Saad Hariri
- Deputy head of government: Ghassan Hasbani
- No. of ministers: 30
- Total no. of members: 30

History
- Predecessor: Second Cabinet of Saad Hariri
- Successor: Cabinet of Hassan Diab

On 6 January 2019, a new Lebanese government was formed, headed by Prime Minister Saad Hariri. The government took nine months to form, following extended negotiations with various political factions. It was a national unity cabinet, and was composed of 30 ministers.

The government was forced to resign on 27 October 2019 following mass protests. It was replaced by the January 2020 government led by Hassan Diab.

== Composition ==
Lebanese government of December 2016
Portfolio (Ministry)	Minister	Political affiliation	Religious Affiliation
President Michel Aoun and Change and Reform Bloc Share (11/30)
Minister of Foreign Affairs and Emigrates	Gebran Bassil	Free Patriotic Movement	Maronite
Minister of Energy and Water	Nada Boustany	Free Patriotic Movement	Maronite
Minister of Economy and Trade	Mansour Bteich	Free Patriotic Movement	Maronite
Minister of Defense	Elias Bou Saab	Free Patriotic Movement	Greek Orthodox
Minister of Justice	Albert Serhan	Free Patriotic Movement	Greek Orthodox
Minister of Displaced	Ghassan Atallah	Free Patriotic Movement	Greek Catholic
State Minister for Presidential Affairs	Salim Jreissati	Free Patriotic Movement	Greek Catholic
Minister of Environment	Fadi Jreisati	Free Patriotic Movement	Greek Catholic
Minister of Tourism	Avedis Gidanian	Tashnag Party	Armenian Orthodox
State Minister for Refugee Affairs	Saleh Gharib	Lebanese Democratic Party	Druze
State Minister for Foreign Trade	Hassan Mrad	Union Party	Sunni
Lebanese Forces (4/30)
Minister of Labor	Camille Abou Sleiman	Lebanese Forces	Maronite
State Minister for Administrative Development	May Chidiac	Lebanese Forces	Maronite
Deputy Prime Minister	Ghassan Hasbani	Lebanese Forces	Greek Orthodox
Minister of Social Affairs	Richard Kouyoumdjian	Lebanese Forces	Armenian Catholic
Prime Minister Saad Hariri Shares (6/30)
Prime Minister	Saad Hariri	Future Movement	Sunni
Minister of Interior and Municipalities	Raya Haffar Hassan	Future Movement	Sunni
Minister of Telecommunications	Mohammad Choucair	Future Movement	Sunni
Minister of Information	Jamal Jarrah	Future Movement	Sunni
State Minister for Technology and Investment	Adel Afiouni	Independents	Sunni
State Minister for the Economic Empowerment of Women and Youth	Violette Khairallah Safadi	Independents	Greek Orthodox
Democratic Gathering Bloc (2/30)
Minister of Education and Higher Learning	Akram Chehayeb	Progressive Socialist Party	Druze
Minister of Industry	Wael Abou Faour	Progressive Socialist Party	Druze
Amal Movement (3/30)
Minister of Finance	Ali Hassan Khalil	Amal Movement	Shia
Minister of Agriculture	Hassan Lakkis	Amal Movement	Shia
Minister of Culture	Muhammad Daoud	Amal Movement	Shia
Loyalty to Resistance Bloc (3/30)
State Minister for Parliamentary Affairs	Mahmoud Kmati	Hezbollah	Shia
Minister of Sports and Youth	Muhammad Fneish	Hezbollah	Shia
Minister of Public Health	Jamil Jabak	Independents	Shia
National Coalition (1/30)
Minister of Public Works and Transport	Youssef Finianos	Marada Movement	Maronite

Preceded by Second Cabinet of Saad Hariri	List of Lebanese governments	Succeeded by Cabinet of Hassan Diab
