= Farid Habib =

Lebanese politician

- Born: 8 January 1935; Kousba
- Died: 31 May 2012 (aged 77)
- Years active: 1970s–2012

Farid Ishak Habib (Arabic: فريد حبيب; 8 January 1935 – 31 May 2012) was a Lebanese politician and a member of the Lebanese Forces party. He was a member of the Strong Republic bloc in the Lebanese Parliament as a representative of Koura district since the 2005 legislative elections. He was one of the two Lebanese Forces representatives in Qornet Shehwan Gathering, along with Eddy Abillammaa.

== Early life and education ==
Habib was born to a Greek Orthodox family from Kousba. He attended Tripoli Evangelical High School and graduated from the American University of Beirut in 1956 with a bachelor's degree in literature.

== Career ==
From 1956 to 1963, Habib worked as an assistant for the public relations manager of The Trans-Arabian Pipeline Company (TAPLINE). He also held the position of staff trainer during this period. From 1963 to 1976, he was the assistant of Sierra Leone's Consul at the Consulate in Lebanon.

He began his political activity in Kataeb Party when he was in high school and remained unofficially active while in college. He officially joined the party in 1976 with the breakdown of the civil war. In the general elections of 2009, Habib won a seat from Koura.

== Personal life ==
Habib was married to Mary Fayad and had two children: Lara and Ziad.

== See also ==
- Lebanese Forces
- List of Lebanese Forces Deputies in the Lebanese Parliament
