= Cesar Maalouf =

Lebanese politician and businessman

Cesar Naim Maalouf (Arabic: قيصر نعيم رزق المعلوف, from Zahle) is a Lebanese politician, businessman and ex-MP for the Lebanese Forces party. His father Naim Maalouf founded the famous oriental patisserie chain SeaSweet, which is today owned by his older brother, Antoine Naim Maalouf.

== Biography ==
He was born in 1978, in the town of Zahlé in Lebanon, and is a Greek Orthodox Christian. His daughter is Perla Maalouf.

He was member of parliament during the Lebanese legislative elections of 2018 for the Lebanese Forces's Strong Republic parliamentary bloc.
