= Ghada Aoun =

Lebanese jurist, judge and state prosecutor

Ghada Georges Aoun
- Born: February 18, 1957 (age 69); Damour, Lebanon
- Education: Lebanese Bachelor degree in Law at St. Joseph University; French Bachelor degree in Law at St. Joseph University; Advanced post graduate in Law at National School of Magistrates; Bachelor of Psychology at Lebanese University
- Occupation: State prosecutor of Mount Lebanon

Ghada Aoun (Arabic: غادة عون) is a Lebanese judge and Mount Lebanon state prosecutor. While some see her as a prominent and incorruptible prosecutor, others accuse her of bias towards the Free Patriotic Movement.

== Cases ==
=== Charges against Imad Osman for corruption ===
In 2019, Aoun sued the Internal Security Forces (ISF) Director Imad Osman, General Hussein Saleh as well as other officers on charges of corruption, in relation to their role in impeding her investigation of wasted subsidized dollars.

=== Charges against Najib Mikati for illegitimate gains ===
Former PM Najib Mikati was accused of obtaining subsidized housing loans illegally, which should be given only to citizens who cannot afford houses. The charges also involved his son and brother, as well as Bank Audi. The accused were referred to the examining magistrate in Beirut for investigation.

=== Ghada Aoun under disciplinary action ===
A week after the case of Najib Mikati, Judge Aoun faced "disciplinary action", by State Prosecutor Ghassan Oueidat, who also urged the security institutions to stop referring cases to Aoun, who replied: “They don’t want me to complete the investigations. They want the thefts to continue”, and also claimed that Oueidat had been “eagerly waiting” for the opportunity to press charges against her for taking initiative in cases against corrupt authority figures.

=== Hadi Hobeish banned from practicing the law for 3 months ===
In 2019, Aoun ordered the arrest of Hoda Salloum, the Director of the Traffic and Vehicles Management Authority (Nefaa, النافعة), who is the relative of MP and lawyer Hadi Hobeich, who in turn accused Aoun of corruption. A video footage of Hobeich circulated while storming her office and threatening her. Beirut Investigative Judge Assaad Bayram banned the MP from practicing law or entering the Justice Palaces for 3 month.

=== Charges against Riad Salameh for breach of trust ===
In 2021, Aoun charged Central Bank Governor Riad Salameh with job negligence and breach of trust. The charges are reportedly in relation to Salameh's management of subsidized dollars.

=== The 2021 raid on money exchange office ===
Aoun carried out a controversial raid on a money exchange company in Awkar, in defiance of a senior judiciary decision that denied her from that investigation, while she was accompanied by Free Patriotic Movement activists.

== See also ==
- Marwan Abboud
- Tarek Bitar
- Fadi Sawan
