= Socialist patriotism =

Form of patriotism promoted by some Marxist–Leninist movements

Socialist patriotism is an ideology and a form of patriotism promoted by Marxist–Leninist movements. Socialist patriotism promotes people living within Marxist–Leninist countries to adopt a "boundless love for the socialist homeland, a commitment to the revolutionary transformation of society [and] the cause of communism". Marxist–Leninists claim that socialist patriotism is not connected with right-wing nationalism, as Marxists and Marxist–Leninists denounce right-wing nationalism as a bourgeois ideology developed under capitalism that sets workers against each other. Socialist patriotism is commonly advocated directly alongside proletarian internationalism, with communist parties regarding the two concepts as compatible with each other. The concept has been attributed by Soviet writers to Karl Marx and Vladimir Lenin.

Lenin separated patriotism into what he defined as proletarian, socialist patriotism from bourgeois nationalism. Lenin promoted the right of all nations to self-determination and the right to unity of all workers within nations; however, he also condemned chauvinism and claimed there were both justified and unjustified feelings of national pride. Lenin believed that nations subjected to imperial rule had the right to seek national liberation from imperial rule.

== Countries' variants ==
=== Soviet Union ===
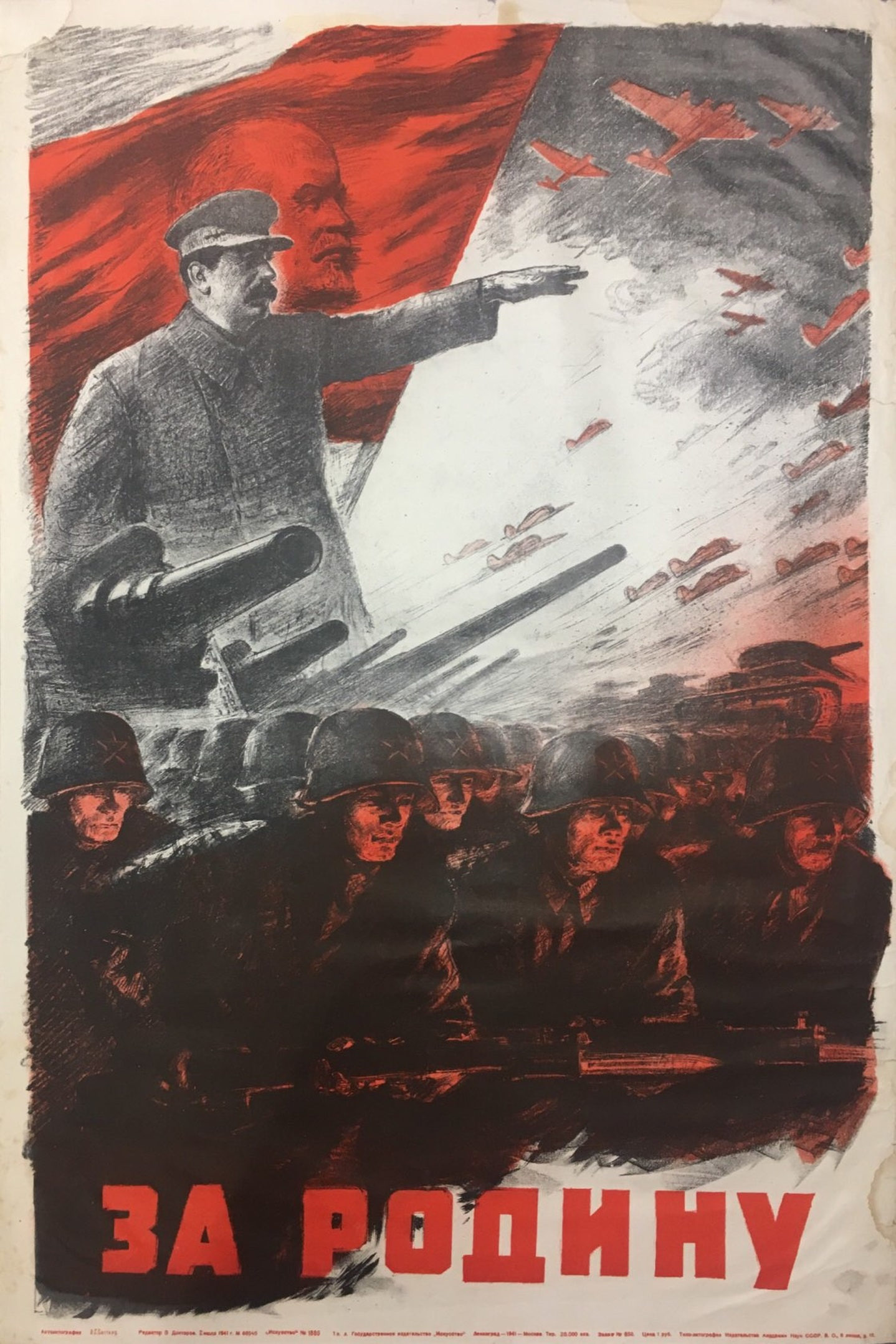
For the Motherland - Soviet patriotic propaganda poster from the Great Patriotic War period.

Initially, the Soviet Russia and early Soviet Union adopted the idea of proletarian internationalism instead of nationalism on which patriotism is based. However, after the inability of socialist revolutions to abolish capitalism and national boundaries, Joseph Stalin promoted socialist patriotism following the theory of "socialism in one country".

Socialist patriotism would supposedly serve both national interest and international socialist interest. While promoting socialist patriotism for the Soviet Union as a whole, Stalin repressed nationalist sentiments in fifteen republics of the Soviet Union. However Soviet patriotism had Russian nationalist overtones in practice.

=== China ===
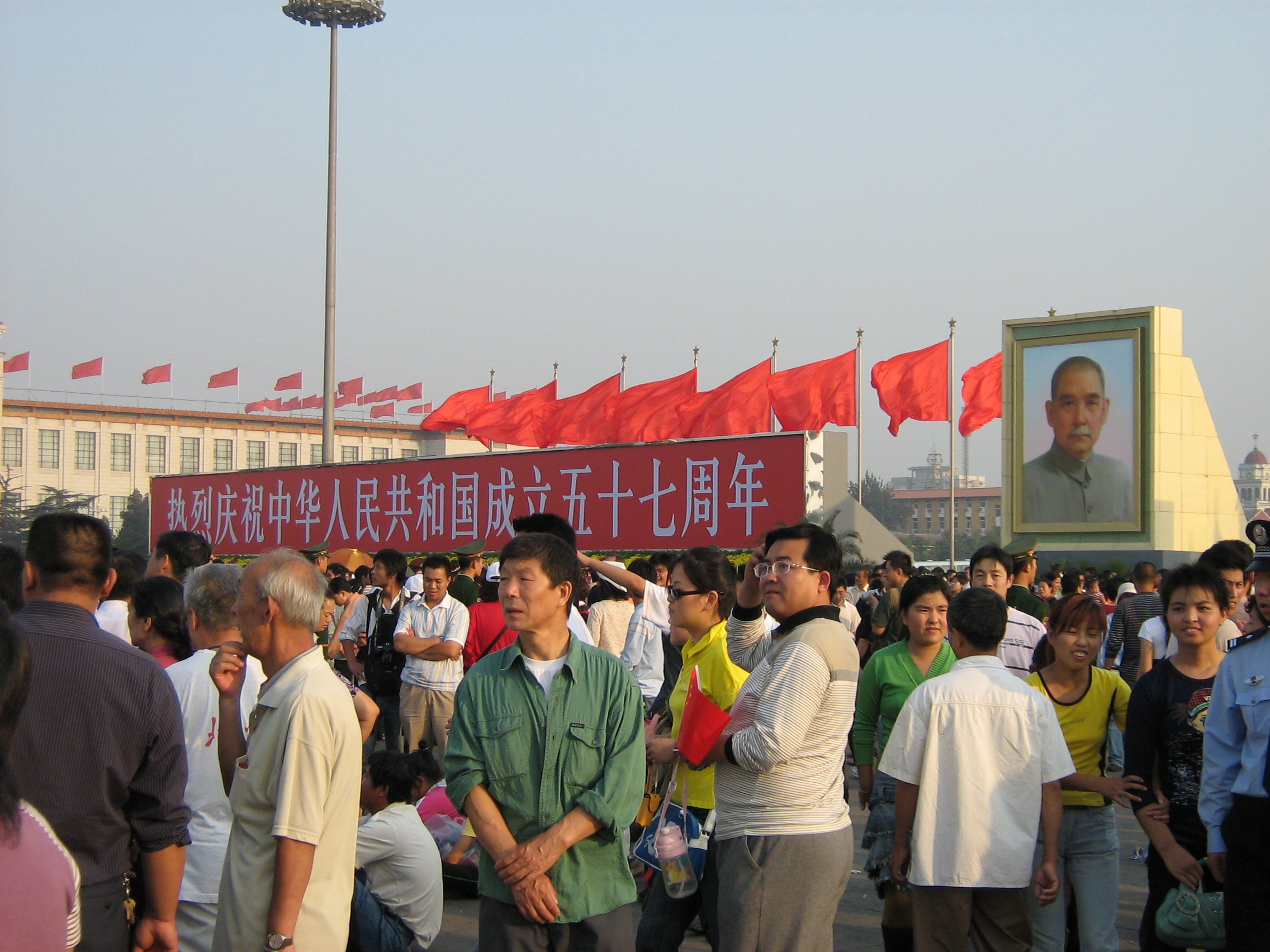
National Day celebrations in Tiananmen Square, Beijing, in 2006.

The Chinese Communist Party and the government of China advocate socialist patriotism. The Chinese Communist Party describes the policy of socialist patriotism as the following: "Socialist patriotism has three levels. At the first level, individuals should subordinate their personal interests to the interests of the state. At the second level, individuals should subordinate their personal destiny to the destiny of our socialist system. At the third level, individuals should subordinate their personal future to the future of our communist cause." The PRC portrays the government as the embodiment of the will of the Chinese people.

Mao Zedong spoke of a Chinese nation, but specified that the Chinese are a civic-based nation of multiple ethnic groups, and explicitly condemned Han ethnocentrism, which Mao called Han chauvinism and claimed had become widespread in China. The constitution of China states that China is a multi-ethnic society and that the state is opposed to national chauvinism and specifies Han chauvinism in particular.

Can a Communist, who is an internationalist, at the same time be a patriot? We hold that he not only can be but also must be. The specific content of patriotism is determined by historical conditions. There is the "patriotism" of the Japanese aggressors and of Hitler, and there is our patriotism. Communists must resolutely oppose the "patriotism" of the Japanese aggressors and of Hitler. The Communists of Japan and Germany are defeatists with regard to the wars being waged by their countries. To bring about the defeat of the Japanese aggressors and of Hitler by every possible means is in the interests of the Japanese and the German people, and the more complete the defeat the better. For the wars launched by the Japanese aggressors and Hitler are harming the people at home as well as the people of the world.

China's case, however, is different, because she is the victim of aggression. Chinese Communists must therefore combine patriotism with internationalism. We are at once internationalists and patriots, and our slogan is, "Fight to defend the motherland against the aggressors." For us defeatism is a crime and to strive for victory in the War of Resistance is an inescapable duty. For only by fighting in defense of the motherland can we defeat the aggressors and achieve national liberation. And only by achieving national liberation will it be possible for the proletariat and other working people to achieve their own emancipation. The victory of China and the defeat of the invading imperialists will help the people of other countries. Thus in wars of national liberation patriotism is applied internationalism.

— Mao Zedong, The Role of the Chinese Communist Party in the National War, October 1938.

=== East Germany ===
The Socialist Unity Party of Germany officially had socialist patriotism within its party statutes. The SED expanded on this by emphasizing a "socialist national consciousness" involving a "love for the GDR and pride in the achievements of socialism." However the GDR said that socialist patriotism was compatible with proletarian internationalism and stated that it should not be confused with nationalism that it associated with chauvinism and xenophobia.

=== Ethiopia ===
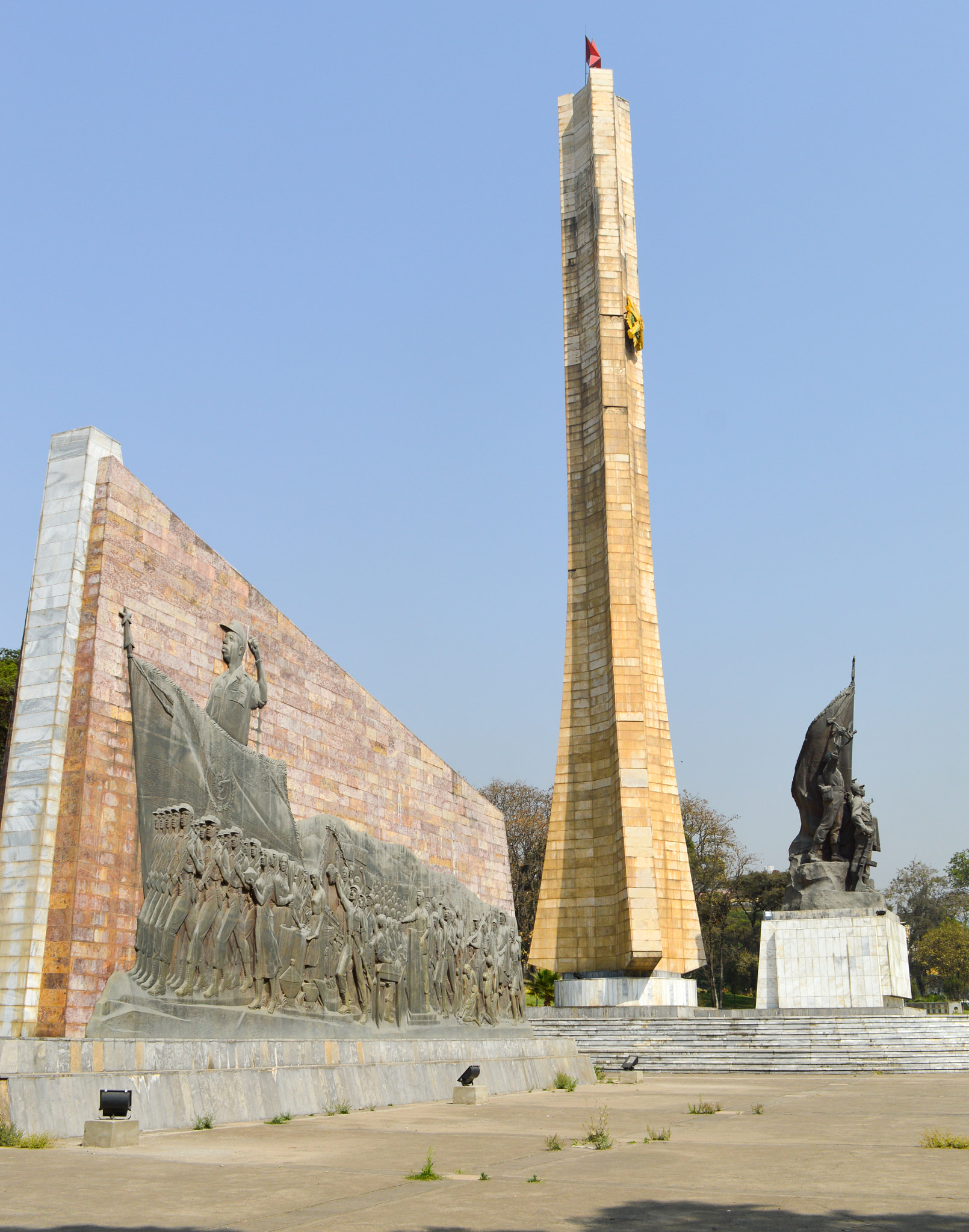
The Tiglachin Monument in Addis Ababa celebrating the victory of Ethiopia during the Derg regime against Somalia during the Ogaden War.

The Derg and the People's Democratic Republic of Ethiopia under Mengistu Haile Mariam advocated socialist patriotism. The Derg declared that "socialist patriotism" meant "true love for one's motherland...[and]...free[dom] from all forms of chauvinism and racialism".

=== North Korea ===
Kim Il Sung promoted socialist patriotism while he condemned nationalism in considered that it destroyed fraternal relations between people because of its exclusivism. In North Korea, socialist patriotism has been described as an ideology meant to serve its own people, be faithful to their working class, and to be loyal to their own (communist) party.

Patriotism is not an empty concept. Education in patriotism cannot be conducted simply by erecting the slogan, "Let us arm ourselves with the spirit of socialist patriotism!" Educating people in the spirit of patriotism must begin with fostering the idea of caring for every tree planted on the road side, for the chairs and desks in the school... There is no doubt that a person who has formed the habit of cherishing common property from childhood will grow up to be a valuable patriot.

— Kim Il Sung

=== Vietnam ===
The Communist Party of Vietnam and the government of Vietnam advocate "socialist patriotism" of the Vietnamese people. Vietnamese Communist leader Ho Chi Minh emphasized the role of socialist patriotism to Vietnamese communism, and emphasized the importance of patriotism, saying: "In the beginning it was patriotism and not communism which impelled me to believe in Lenin and the Third International."

After the collapse of the Indochinese Communist Party in 1941, the Vietnamese Communist movement since the 1940s fused the policies of proletarian internationalism and Vietnamese patriotism together. Vietnamese Communist Party leader Ho Chi Minh was responsible for the incorporation of Vietnamese patriotism into the Party, he had been born into a family with strong anticolonial political views towards French rule in Vietnam. The incorporation of Vietnamese patriotism into the Communist Party's policy fit in with the longstanding Vietnamese struggle against French colonial rule. Although Ho opposed French colonial rule in Vietnam, he harboured no dislike of France as a whole, stating that French colonial rule was "cruel and inhumane" but that the French people at home were good people. He had studied in France as a youth where he became an adherent to Marxism–Leninism, and he personally admired the French Revolutionary motto of "liberty, equality, fraternity". He witnessed the Treaty of Versailles that applied the principles of Woodrow Wilson's Fourteen Points that advocated national self-determination, resulting in the end of imperial rule over many peoples in Europe. He was inspired by the Wilsonian concept of national self-determination.

=== Yugoslavia ===
The Socialist Federal Republic of Yugoslavia endorsed socialist patriotism, promoting the concept of "brotherhood and unity", where the Yugoslav nations would overcome their cultural and linguistic differences through promoting fraternal relations between the nations.

=== Cuba ===
There is an element of socialist patriotism combined with left-wing nationalism within the Communist Party of Cuba in Cuba.

=== India ===
In India, Communist Party of India (Marxist) combines patriotism with proletarian internationalism as per its official party programme, plans to bring all patriotic and democratic forces for a people's democratic revolution to establish socialism. The party speaks of the ideals of the Marxist and socialist revolutionaries of Indian freedom movement and vows to safeguard the constitutional values and democratic rights of the people, along with the secular and democratic character of Republic of India, and to establish social and economic justice with strong views for sovereignty of India and against imperialism.

Other parties like Communist Party of India and Communist Party of India (Marxist-Leninist) Liberation also share similar views.

== See also ==
- Anti-imperialism
- National communism
- Social patriotism
