= 2021 Beirut clashes =

2021 armed clashes in Beirut, Lebanon

Coordinates: 33.870734°N 35.514197°E

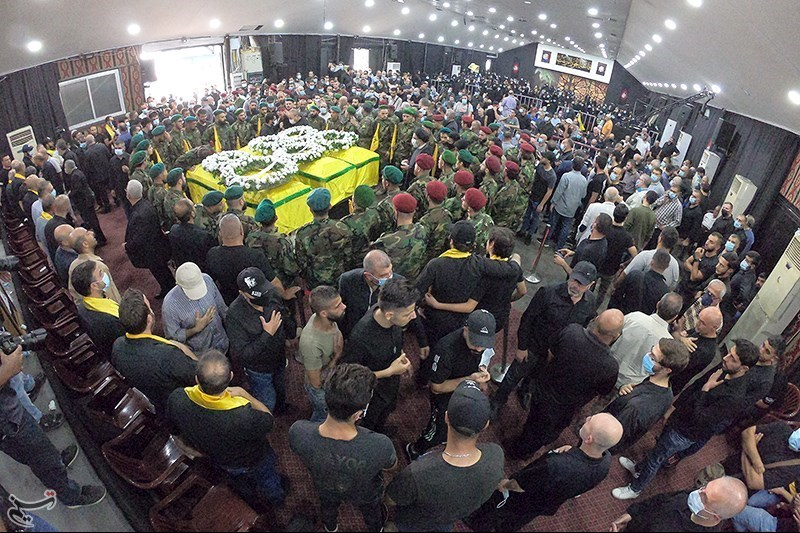
- Funeral of the Hezbollah members killed in the clashes
Date	14 October 2021
Location	Ain El Remmaneh Beirut, Lebanon

Belligerents
Hezbollah; Amal Movement	(Lebanon) Lebanese Armed Forces	Lebanese Forces (alleged)

Casualties and losses
- 3 killed 3 killed
- 1 civilian woman killed Total: 7 killed and 32 wounded

The 2021 Beirut clashes, also known as the Tayouneh Incident or Mini May 7, occurred in the Tayouneh neighborhood of the Lebanese capital of Beirut on 14 October 2021 between Hezbollah and the Amal Movement, and unidentified gunmen allegedly associated with the Lebanese Forces, and the Lebanese Armed Forces, resulting in the death of seven people and injury of 32 others, and the arrest of nine by the Lebanese Armed Forces. The violence erupted during a protest organized by Hezbollah and its allies against Tarek Bitar, the lead judge probing the 2020 explosion in the city's port, as they accuse him of being partisan. The clashes took place at the Justice Palace, located in Eastern Beirut along the former civil war front line between the Christian and Muslim Shiite areas. The clashes were the worst in the country since the 2008 Lebanon conflict.

== Background ==
During the Lebanese Civil War of 1975–1990, parties and militias formed along religious, ideological, and ethnic lines. Lebanon's capital Beirut was divided, as Sunni and Shia Muslim, Palestinian, and Christian factions fought for control. Among the groups which emerged during this period were the Lebanese Forces, Hezbollah, and Amal Movement. The Lebanese Forces originated as a militia which united various right-wing Christian parties, while Hezbollah and Amal were organized as Shia militant groups that were opposed to the Christian factions. Historically, Hezbollah and Amal struggled for dominance within the Lebanese Shia community, with Hezbollah eventually becoming the predominant faction. Various foreign countries intervened in the civil war, most prominently Israel and Syria, further muddling allegiances and worsening violent factionalism.

Following the civil war, armed groups like the Lebanese Forces, Amal, and Hezbollah transformed into political parties, yet continued to field paramilitary wings. Hezbollah remained particularly committed to its armed forces which grew into a medium-sized army. In the 2000s, Lebanon's political scene divided into two main blocs which formed in accordance to parties' stance regarding Syria's influence on the country. The March 14 Alliance, which includes the Lebanese Forces, is anti-Syrian, whereas the pro-Syrian March 8 Alliance is backed by Hezbollah and Amal.

== Prelude ==
Lebanon had been in a state of financial crisis since 2019, and the situation gradually worsened with the COVID-19 recession and the explosion in the port of Beirut. In August 2021, a fuel tanker explosion in Akkar District killed dozens of people. During autumn of 2021, the Lebanese energy market collapsed upon fuel shortages and on 9 October 2021, the country plunged into a 24-hour national blackout, as power plants ran out of fuel. The leaders of both the Amal Movement and Hezbollah, Nabih Berri and Hassan Nasrallah, had called for an end to the investigation into the explosion by Tarek Bitar, as they accuse him of being partisan. Bitar is characterized as having no party bias or political affiliation.

== Incident ==
On 14 October 2021, protests were held in the Tayouneh neighborhood of Beirut by supporters of Hezbollah and the Amal Movement; several of the demonstrators were armed. They were calling for the removal of Tarek Bitar, the judge appointed to investigate the Beirut port explosion. At one point, the protesters entered the Christian neighbourhood of Ain El Remmeneh. The demonstrators were shot at by snipers from nearby buildings, though the latter's identity was unclear. The attackers even used rocket-propelled grenades, and also attacked Lebanese Armed Forces soldiers. Hezbollah claimed the snipers were Lebanese Forces supporters, though this is unconfirmed. Later on, a video surfaced showing a Lebanese Army soldier shooting at the demonstrators.

Fighting consequently erupted in Beirut, as Hezbollah militants shot assault rifles and rocket-propelled grenades, including at the buildings where the snipers were allegedly located. Four projectiles fell near a private French school, Freres of Furn el Chebbak, causing a panic. The Lebanese Army was one of the first to evacuate people from the area. Lebanese Armed Forces patrols, including special forces, tried to restore order; doing so, they clashed with gunmen and used live ammunition.

Hezbollah-affiliated activists have claimed, but not verified, that one of the snipers was Shukri Abu Saab, an employee of the US embassy in Beirut. A Syrian national was among those arrested and detained in connection with the sniper and militant attacks.

== Aftermath ==
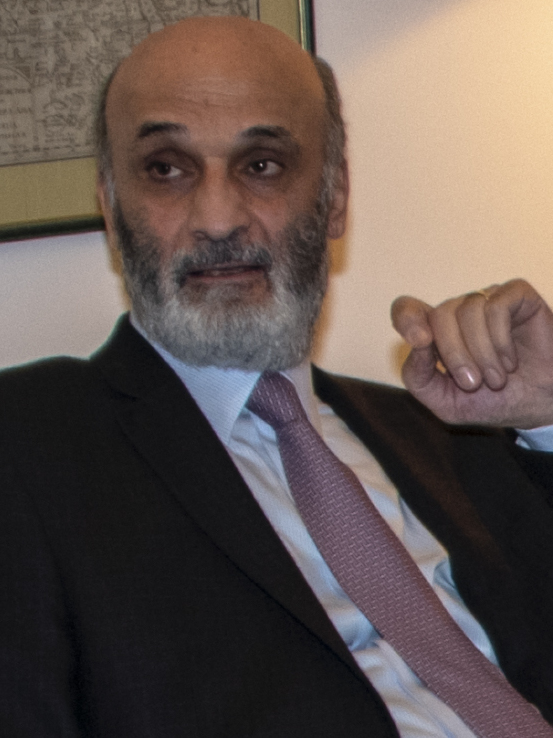
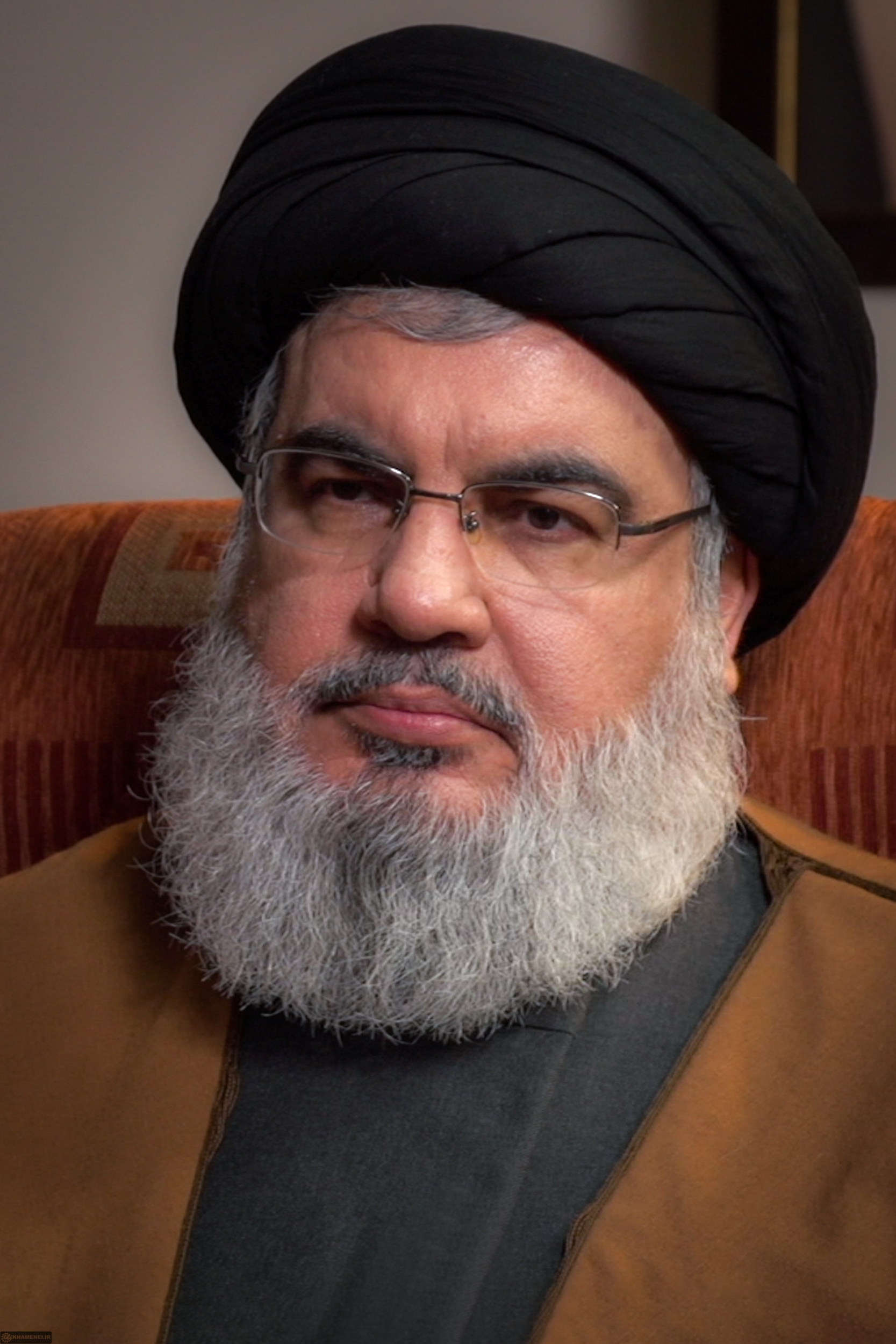
Samir Geagea (left) and Hassan Nasrallah both accused each other's parties for instigating the violence

Seven people were killed overall in the incident. The Amal Movement and Hezbollah lost three dead militants each; one of the Hezbollah casualties was a participant in the Syrian Civil War. In addition, a woman was killed inside her home. Overall, 32 people were injured. The clash only escalated fears of an imminent collapse of Lebanon and a return to the days of the Lebanese Civil War. The Lebanese Army consequently raided several locations in Beirut, arresting nine individuals connected to the parties involved in the clash. President Michel Aoun vowed to "bring the perpetrators to justice". The Lebanese Armed Forces has opened an investigation into the footage of a soldier opening fire at the demonstrators.

Samir Geagea was summoned by military intelligence to testify about the events, as both Hezbollah and the Amal Movement accused his party of instigating the violence. Geagea denied these allegations, asserting that his supporters acted in self-defense against an attack by Hezbollah loyalists who had vandalized property in the area. On the day he was scheduled to appear, Geagea did not show up, and his supporters protested the summons, blocking roads in support.

The clashes caused great trauma among Lebanese, who did not wish to return to the days of the Lebanese Civil War. Banks, schools, offices and shops closed in many places as funerals of those killed in the clashes were held.

On 4 August 2023, protesters in Beirut marked the third anniversary of the massive non-nuclear explosion, demanding justice for over 220 people killed and 6,500 injured. The investigation remains stalled due to political interference, leaving survivors still seeking answers.

== Reactions ==
=== Domestic ===
President Michel Aoun expressed in a televised address that those responsible for the violence would be held accountable, he stated that “I have made contacts with the relevant parties today to address what happened and most importantly, to make sure that it never happens again." He compared the clashes to the Lebanese Civil War, stating “It took us back to the days that we said we would never forget and never repeat."

Cars with mounted guns and flags of the Shia Amal Movement and Hezbollah were driving throughout the Beqaa valley in an apparent show of strength for the two movements. Hezbollah went on the claim that the Lebanese Forces had organized the incident with support by the United States to destabilize Lebanon. Lebanese Forces official Imad Wakim responded by stating that the clash was not the result of ethnic or party rivalries, but rather a "confrontation between Hezbollah and the remaining free Lebanese of all sects, in order to preserve what remains of the state institutions and to protect them from Hezbollah's dominance." In a televised response to the event, Nasrallah insisted that he has up to 100,000 militants ready to deploy at any time.

Prime Minister Najib Mikati stated that Lebanon would hold a national day of mourning for those killed in the attacks. He later told reporters that the clashes would be a setback for his government, but would be overcome, stating that Lebanon "is going through a difficult phase, not an easy one. We are like a patient in front of the emergency room.”

=== International ===
- US State Department spokesman Ned Price urged the de-escalation of tensions between political parties. Similarly, United States Under Secretary of State Victoria Nuland, who had just visited Beirut that day, called the scene "unacceptable".
- The Kuwaiti Ministry Of Foreign Affairs encouraged Kuwaitis in Lebanon to return to Kuwait, and called on them to "exercise caution" and to "stay away from sites of gatherings and security disturbances in some areas and to stay in their residences".
- French Foreign Minister Jean-Yves Le Drian expressed "deep concern", claiming that "France notes its deep concern over recent obstacles to the smooth unfolding of the investigation into the explosion in the port of Beirut on August 4, 2020, and the violence that has taken place in that regard", and that the Lebanese judiciary should be able to work closely on the investigation.

=== Intergovernmental organizations ===
- A spokesperson for the Secretary-General of the United Nations António Guterres stated that "U.N. Secretary-General António Guterres calls on all concerned in Lebanon to immediately halt acts of violence and refrain from provocative actions or inflammatory rhetoric".
