= Antoine Karam =

Antoine Karam may refer to:

- Antoine Karam (French Guianan politician)
- Antoine Karam (Lebanese politician)

== See also ==
- Marie-Antoine Carême, French chef
