= Elie Keyrouz =

Lebanese politician

- إيلي كيروز

Member of the Lebanese Parliament
- In office 20 June 2005 – 7 June 2009
- Preceded by: Qabalan Shibl Issa Al-Khoury
- Succeeded by: Elie Keyrouz
- Constituency: Bsharri

Member of the Lebanese Parliament
- In office 7 June 2009 – 6 May 2018
- Preceded by: Elie Keyrouz
- Succeeded by: Joseph Ishak
- Constituency: Bsharri

Head of the Political Education Department in the Lebanese Forces
- In office 1987–1990
- Succeeded by: Antoine Habchy

Head of Bsharri Region in the Lebanese Forces
- In office 1993–2010

Member of the Lebanese Forces Executive Board
- Incumbent
- Assumed office 2006

Member of the Maronite League
- Incumbent
- Assumed office 2007

Personal details
- Born: Elie Keyrouz; 1958 (age 67–68) Bsharri
- Party: Lebanese Forces
- Children: 3
- Education: Law, Saint Joseph University, Beirut; Philosophy, Lebanese University

Elie Keyrouz (Arabic: إيلي كيروز, born 1958) is a Lebanese Maronite politician and a member of the Lebanese Forces party. He has been an MP in the Lebanese Parliament as a representative of Bsharri District since the 2005 legislative elections. Kayrouz has been the head of Bcharre bureau in the LF since 1992. He was arrested in August, 2001 in a crackdown on Anti-Syrian Christian groups (namely, the LF and the Free Patriotic Movement) and released on bail in November. He is married with three children.

== See also ==
- Lebanese Forces
- List of Lebanese Forces Deputies in the Lebanese Parliament
