= Lebanese Forces =

Lebanese Christian nationalist political party and former militia

Lebanese Forces القوات اللبنانية al-Quwwāt al-Lubnānīyah
- Abbreviation: LF
- Secretary-General: Emile Moukarzel
- President: Samir Geagea
- Founder: Bachir Gemayel
- Vice-president: Georges Adwan
- Founded: 1976
- Headquarters: Maarab, Lebanon
- Newspaper: Almassira
- Membership: 50,000
- Ideology: Lebanese nationalism; Right-wing nationalism; Christian democracy
- Political position: Right-wing
- National affiliation: March 14 Alliance (2005–2016)
- European affiliation: European People's Party (regional partner)
- International affiliation: International Democrat Union (formerly)
- Colours: Red, white, green
- Parliamentary bloc: Strong Republic
- Parliament: 19 / 128
- Council of Ministers: 4 / 24

Party flag

Website
- www.lebanese-forces.com

The Lebanese Forces (Arabic: القوات اللبنانية al-Quwwāt al-Libnānīyah) is a Lebanese Christian-based political party and former militia during the Lebanese Civil War. It currently holds 19 of the 128 seats in Lebanon's parliament, being the largest party of the country.

The organization was created in 1976 by Pierre and Bachir Gemayel, Camille Chamoun, and other party leaders during the Lebanese Civil War. It was initially an umbrella organization coordinating all the right-wing party militias of the Lebanese Front and served as the main resistance force of the front. The Kataeb Regulatory Forces provided the largest share of fighters, and the Kataeb Party had the largest share on the council. Despite its original creation from party militias, the Lebanese Forces accepted new recruits without any specific party allegiance.

During the civil war, the Lebanese Forces fought different opponents at different times: the Palestine Liberation Organization, the Lebanese National Movement, the Lebanese National Resistance Front, the Syrian Army, the Druze-dominated Progressive Socialist Party in the Chouf, and the Lebanese Army loyal to General Michel Aoun. After the assassination of its leader, Bachir Gemayel, in 1982, political friction within the Lebanese Front resulted in growing distance between the Kataeb militants and the rest of the Lebanese Forces. In the end, the Lebanese Forces and Kataeb became two separate forces within the Lebanese Front. A few uprisings led to Lebanese Forces commander-in-chief Samir Geagea taking over and dissolving the Lebanese Front in the late 1980s.

After the civil war ended, Geagea created the Lebanese Forces Party. In 1994, while Lebanon was under Syrian occupation, the party was banned, Geagea imprisoned and the activities of its militants repressed by the Lebanese services in Lebanon. The Lebanese Forces returned as a political force after the Cedar Revolution in early 2005, which resulted in a withdrawal of Syrian troops from Lebanon. Soon after, Geagea was subsequently released from prison and continues to lead the party today.

== History ==
=== Lebanese Forces militia (1976–1990) ===
==== Formation ====
The Lebanese Front was informally organized in January 1976 under the leadership of Bashir's father, Pierre Gemayel and Camille Chamoun. It began as a simple coordination or joint command between the predominantly Christian Kataeb Party/Kataeb Regulatory Forces (KRF), Tyous Team of Commandos (TTC), Ahrar/Tigers Militia, Al-Tanzim, Marada Brigade and Lebanese Renewal Party/Guardians of the Cedars (GoC) parties and their respective military wings. The main reason behind the formation of the Lebanese Front was to strengthen the Christian side against the challenge presented by the Lebanese National Movement (LNM), an umbrella alliance of leftist parties/militias allied with the Palestine Liberation Organization (PLO) and Rejectionist Front Palestinian guerrilla factions.

Christian East Beirut was ringed by heavily fortified Palestinian camps from which kidnappings and sniping against Lebanese civilians became a daily routine. Christian East Beirut became besieged by the PLO camps, with severe shortages of food and fuel. This unbearable situation was remedied by the Kataeb Regulatory Forces (most notably the BG Squad that was led by Bachir) and their allied Christian militias as they besieged the Palestinian camps embedded in Christian East Beirut one at a time and brought them down. The first was on 18 January 1976 when the heavily fortified Karantina camp, located near the strategic Beirut Harbor, was invaded: About 1,000 PLO fighters and civilians were killed. The Palestinian PLO and al-Saiqa forces retaliated by attacking the isolated defenseless Christian town of Damour about 20 miles south of Beirut on the coast, during the Damour massacre in which an estimated 150 to 500 Christian civilians were killed and 5,000 were sent fleeing north by boat, since all roads were blocked off. The Maronites retaliated with the invasion of the largest and strongest Palestinian refugee camp, Tel al-Zaatar that same year. Bachir, with his KRF militia units, also fought against the PLO and LNM militias at the Battle of the Hotels in central Beirut. The most important battle won by the Phalange for the control of the hotel district was the fighting over the possession of the Holiday Inn, due to its important strategic location. Before that battle, the Holiday Inn had been occupied by the PLO.

The Lebanese Forces militia was soon after established with an agreement that the direct military commander would be a Kataeb member and the vice-commander an Ahrar member.

Bachir led his troops in the infamous "Hundred Days War" in Lebanon in 1978, in which the Lebanese Forces successfully resisted the Syrian shelling and attacking of Eastern Beirut for about three months before an Arab-brokered agreement forced the Syrians to end the siege. Syrians took high buildings such as Burj Rizk Achrafieh and Burj El Murr using snipers and heavy weapons against civilians. The soldiers stayed for 90 days. Another major clash took place near the Sodeco area in Achrafieh where the Lebanese Forces fought ferociously and led the Syrian army out of the Rizk Building. At this time, Israel was the primary backer of the Lebanese Front's militia.

In July 1980, following months of intra-Christian clashes between the Tigers, the militia of Dany, and the Phalangists, who by now were under the complete leadership of Bachir Gemayel, the Phalangists launched an operation in an attempt to stop the clashes within the Christian areas, and to unite all the Christian militias under Gemayel's command. This operation resulted in a massacre of tens of Tigers' members at the Marine beach resort in Safra, 25 km north of Beirut. Camille Chamoun's silence was interpreted as acceptance of Gemayel's controls, because he felt that the Tigers led by his son were getting out of his control.

In 1981 at Zahlé in the Beqaa, the largest Christian town in the East, confronted one of the biggest battles – both military and political – between the Lebanese Forces and the Syrian occupying forces. The Lebanese Forces was able to confront them even though there was a big mismatch in military capabilities and was able to reverse the result of the battle of 1981. This victory was due to the bravery of the inhabitants and 92 Lebanese Forces soldiers (L.F Special Forces: The Maghaweer) sent from Beirut. The Syrian occupying forces used all kind of weapons (heavy artillery, tanks, war planes...) against a peaceful town, and they cut all kind of backup that may come from the Mountain. Regardless of the very bad weather and heavy bombing, convoys were sent in the snow to Zahle. Two Lebanese Forces soldiers died on a hill due to bad weather, they were found later holding each other... till they died. The battle of Zahle gave the Lebanese Cause a new perspective in the International Communities, and the victory was both military and diplomatic. It made the Leadership of President Bashir Gemayel much stronger because of his leadership and important role in this battle. The battle started on 2 April 1981, and finished with a cease fire and Lebanese Police were sent to Zahle. The 92 Lebanese Forces heroes returned to Beirut on 1 July 1981.

==== Under President Bashir Gemayel (1976–1982) ====
Christian East Beirut was ringed by heavily fortified Palestinian camps from which kidnappings and sniping against Lebanese civilians became a daily routine. Christian East Beirut became besieged by the PLO camps, with severe shortages of food and fuel. This unbearable situation was remedied by the Kataeb Regulatory Forces (most notably the BG Squad that was led by Bachir) and their allied Christian militias as they besieged the Palestinian camps embedded in Christian East Beirut one at a time and brought them down. The first was on 18 January 1976 when the heavily fortified Karantina camp, located near the strategic Beirut Harbor, was invaded: About 1,000 PLO fighters and civilians were killed. The Palestinian PLO and al-Saiqa forces retaliated by attacking the isolated defenseless Christian town of Damour about 20 miles south of Beirut on the coast, during the Damour massacre in which 1,000 Christian civilians were killed and 5,000 were sent fleeing north by boat, since all roads were blocked off. The Maronites retaliated with the invasion of the largest and strongest Palestinian refugee camp, Tel al-Zaatar that same year. Bachir, with his KRF militia units, also fought against the PLO and LNM militias at the Battle of the Hotels in central Beirut. The most important battle won by the Phalange for the control of the hotel district was the fighting over the possession of the Holiday Inn, due to its important strategic location. Before that battle, the Holiday Inn had been occupied by the PLO. Eventually the PLO ended up occupying the Holliday Inn once again, while the Kataeb forces retreated to the facing Hilton Hotel in what was known as the "Hotel War".

The Lebanese Forces was soon after established with an agreement that the direct military commander would be a Kataeb member and the vice-commander an Ahrar member.

Bashir led his troops in the infamous "Hundred Days War" in Lebanon in 1978, in which the Lebanese Forces successfully resisted the Syrian shelling and attacking of Eastern Beirut for about three months before an Arab-brokered agreement forced the Syrians to end the siege. Syrians took high buildings such as Burj Rizk Achrafieh and Burj El Murr using snipers and heavy weapons against civilians. The soldiers stayed for 90 days. Another major clash took place near the Sodeco area in Achrafieh where the Lebanese Forces fought ferociously and led the Syrian army out of the Rizk Building. At this time, Israel was the primary backer of the Lebanese Front's militia.

In July 1980, following months of intra-Christian clashes between the Tigers, the militia of Dany, and the Phalangists, who by now were under the complete leadership of Bachir Gemayel, the Phalangists launched an operation in an attempt to stop the clashes within the Christian areas, and to unite all the Christian militias under Gemayel's command. This operation resulted in a massacre of tens of Tigers' members at the Marine beach resort in Safra, 25 km north of Beirut. Camille Chamoun's silence was interpreted as acceptance of Gemayel's controls.

In 1981 at Zahlé in the Beqaa, the largest Christian town in the East, confronted one of the biggest battles – both military and political – between the Lebanese Forces and the Syrian occupying forces. The Lebanese Forces was able to confront them even though there was a big mismatch in military capabilities and was able to reverse the result of the battle of 1981. This victory was due to the bravery of the inhabitants and 92 Lebanese Forces soldiers (L.F Special Forces: The Maghaweer) sent from Beirut. The Syrian occupying forces used all kind of weapons (heavy artillery, tanks, war planes...) against a peaceful town, and they cut all kind of backup that may come from the Mountain. Regardless of the very bad weather and heavy bombing, convoys were sent in the snow to Zahle. Two Lebanese Forces soldiers died on a hill due to bad weather and were found later holding each other. The battle of Zahle gave the Lebanese Cause a new perspective in the International Communities, and the victory was both military and diplomatic. It made the Leadership of President Bashir Gemayel much stronger because of his leadership and important role in this battle. The battle started on 2 April 1981, and finished with a cease fire and Lebanese Police were sent to Zahle. The 92 Lebanese Forces heroes returned to Beirut on 1 July 1981.

==== Israeli invasion ====
In 1982, Bachir met with Hani Al-Hassan (representative of the PLO) and told him that Israel would enter and wipe them out. Bachir told him to leave Lebanon peacefully before it was too late. Hani left and no reply was given to Bachir.

Israel invaded Lebanon, arguing that a military intervention was necessary to root out PLO guerrillas from the southern part of the country. Israeli forces eventually moved towards Beirut and laid siege to the city, aiming to reshape the Lebanese political landscape and force the PLO out of Lebanon. By 1982, Israel had been the main supplier to the Lebanese Forces, giving them assistance in weapons, clothing, and training.

An official Israeli inquiry into events in Beirut estimated that when fully mobilized the Phalange had 5000 fighters of whom 2000 were full-time.

After the PLO had been expelled from the country to Tunisia, in a negotiated agreement, Bachir Gemayel became the youngest man to ever be elected as president of Lebanon. He was elected by the parliament in August; most Muslim members of parliament boycotted the vote.

On 3 September 1982, during the meeting, Begin demanded that Bachir sign a peace treaty with Israel as soon as he took office in return of Israel's earlier support of Lebanese Forces and he also told Bachir that the IDF will stay in South Lebanon if the Peace Treaty was not directly signed. Bachir was furious at Begin. The meeting ended in rage and both sides were not happy with each other.

Begin was reportedly angry at Bachir for his public denial of Israel's support. Bachir refused the immediate peace arguing that time is needed to reach consensus with Lebanese Muslims and the Arab nations. Bachir was quoted telling David Kimche, the director general of the Israeli Foreign Ministry, few days earlier, "Please tell your people to be patient. I am committed to make peace with Israel, and I shall do it. But I need time – nine months, maximum one year. I need to mend my fences with the Arab countries, especially with Saudi Arabia, so that Lebanon can once again play its central role in the economy of the Middle East."

In an attempt to fix the relations between Bachir and Begin, Ariel Sharon met secretly with Bachir in Bikfaya. In this meeting, they both agreed that, after 48 hours, the IDF will cooperate with the Lebanese Army to force the Syrian Army out of Lebanon. After that is done, the IDF would peacefully leave the Lebanese territory. Concerning the Peace Negotiation, Sharon agreed to give Bachir time to fix the internal conflicts before signing the negotiation. The next day, Begin's office issued a statement saying that the issues agreed upon between Bachir and Sharon were accepted.

Nine days before he was to take office, on 14 September 1982, Bachir was killed along with 25 others in a bomb explosion in the Kataeb headquarters in Achrafieh. The attack was carried out by Habib Shartouni, a member of the Syrian Social Nationalist Party (SSNP), believed by many to have acted on instructions of the Syrian government of President Hafez al-Assad. The next day, Israel moved to occupy the city, allowing Phalangist members under Elie Hobeika's command to enter the centrally located Sabra and the Shatila refugee camp; a massacre followed, in which Phalangists killed between 762 and 3,500 (number is disputed) civilians, mostly Palestinians and Lebanese Shiites, causing great international uproar.

==== The Amine Gemayel years (1982–1988) ====
After the Israeli invasion, the IDF troops settled in the Chouf and Aley from party militias, the Lebanese Forces returned to the villages which had been occupied by the PSP for seven years. However, soon after, clashes broke out between the Lebanese Forces and the Druze militias who had now taken over the districts. The main Druze militiamen came from the Progressive Socialist Party, led by Walid Jumblatt, in alliance with the Syrian Army and Palestinian militants. For months, the two fought what would later be known as the "Mountain War", resulting in a large PSP victory. At the same time, the Lebanese Forces troops also fought battles against the Palestinian and Druze militias and the Syrian troop east of the southern city of Sidon. The outcome was also a Progressive Socialist Party victory and a contiguous Druze Chouf district with access to Lebanese sea ports. Later in 1984, the PSP won decisive battles against the Lebanese Army in the Chahar region in the Aley District. The PSP then attacked further into Souk El Gharb, a village held by the Lebanese Army's 8th Mechanised Infantry Brigade commanded by then Colonel Michel Aoun. The attackers were fiercely pushed back as the American helped Aoun by bombing the PSP from their navy.

==== Internal power struggles ====
After the death of Bachir, his brother Amine Gemayel replaced him as president, and his cousin, Fadi Frem as commander of the Lebanese Forces. The two had a frosty relationship, and in 1984, pressure from Amine led to Frem's replacement by Fouad Abou Nader.

On 12 March 1985, Samir Geagea, Elie Hobeika and Karim Pakradouni rebelled against Abou Nader's command, ostensibly to take the Lebanese Forces back to its original path. The relationship between Geagea and Hobeika soon broke down, however, and Hobeika began secret negotiations with the Syrians. On 28 December 1985, he signed the Tripartite Accord, against the wishes of Geagea and most of the other leading Christian figures. Claiming that the Tripartite Accord gave Syria unlimited power in Lebanon, Geagea mobilized factions inside the Lebanese Forces and on 15 January 1986, attacked Hobeika's headquarters in Karantina. Hobeika surrendered and fled, first to Paris and subsequently to Damascus, Syria. He then moved to Zahlé with tens of his fighters where he prepared for an attack against East Beirut. On 27 September 1986, Hobeika's forces tried to take over the Achrafieh neighborhood of Beirut but the Lebanese Forces of Geagea's command held them back.

In May 1985, during the period of Hobeika's leadership, the Lebanese Forces closed their office in Jerusalem. The office was headed by Pierre Yazbeck.

This failed attempt by Hobeika was the last episode of internal struggles in East Beirut during Amine Gemayel's mandate. As a result, the Lebanese Forces led by Geagea were the only major force on ground. During two years of frail peace, Geagea launched a drive to re-equip and reorganize the Lebanese Forces. He also instituted a social welfare program in areas controlled by Geagea's party. The Lebanese Forces also cut its relations with Israel and emphasized relations with the Arab states, mainly Iraq but also Saudi Arabia, Jordan, and Egypt.

==== The Elimination War (1988–1990) ====
Two rival governments contended for recognition following Amine Gemayel's departure from the Presidency in September 1988, one a mainly Christian government and the other a government of Muslims and Lebanese Leftists. The Lebanese Forces initially supported the military Christian government led by General Michel Aoun, the commander of the Lebanese Army. However, clashes erupted between the Lebanese Forces and the Lebanese Army under the control of Michel Aoun on 14 February 1989. These clashes were stopped, and after a meeting in Bkerké, the Lebanese Forces handed the national ports which it controlled to Aoun's government under pressure from the Lebanese National army.

The Lebanese Forces initially supported Aoun's "Liberation War" against the Syrian army, but then agreed to the Taif Agreement, which was signed by the Lebanese deputies on 24 October 1989 in Saudi Arabia and demanded an immediate ceasefire. Aoun's main objection to the Taif Agreement was its vagueness as to Syrian withdrawal from the country. He rejected it vowing that he "would not sign over the country". Fierce fighting in East Beirut broke out between the Lebanese Forces and the Lebanese Army under Michel Aoun after the Lebanese Army, under orders of Michel Aoun, began stopping and arresting members of the Lebanese Forces. These events led to the "Elimination War" on 31 January 1990. The war continued until the defeat and exile of Aoun to France in August 1990. During the war, the Lebanese Forces made major strides and victories including the capture of many of the army's encampments, barracks, and units.

=== Lebanese Forces Party (1990–present) ===
==== The Second Republic (1990–2005) ====
After Aoun surrendered on 13 October 1990 to the rival Syrian-backed President Hrawi, Geagea was offered ministerial posts in the new government. He refused several times, because he was opposed to Syrian interference in Lebanese affairs, and his relationship with the new government deteriorated. The Lebanese Forces and the National Liberal Party boycotted the 1992 general election demanding that Syria withdraw first and elections postponed until people displaced by the civil war had time to return to their homes. On 23 March 1994, the Lebanese government headed by Rafic Hariri ordered the dissolution of the Lebanese Forces, Ministers Sleiman Frangieh, Michel Samaha, Nicholas Fattoush and Mikhael Daher voted against the dissolution of LF.

On 19 March, the offices of the Lebanese Forces (LF) were raided and six people arrested, including Fouad Malik, LF secretary general, and three members of the LF intelligence apparatus, including a woman. Also detained were a man and a woman from the Guardians of the Cedars. On 21 April 1994, Geagea was arrested on charges of setting a bomb in the church in Zouk which killed eleven people, of instigating acts of violence, and of committing assassinations during the Lebanese Civil War. Although he was acquitted of the first charge, Geagea was subsequently arrested and sentenced to life imprisonment on several different counts, including the assassination of former Prime Minister Rashid Karami in 1987. He was incarcerated in solitary confinement, with his access to the outside world severely restricted. Amnesty International criticized the conduct of the trials and demanded Geagea's release, and Geagea's supporters argued that the Syrian-controlled Lebanese government had used the alleged crimes as a pretext for jailing Geagea and banning an anti-Syrian party. Many members of the Lebanese Forces were arrested and brutally tortured in the period of 1993–1994. At least one died in Syrian custody and many others were severely injured.

In 1998, a group of ex-military persons in the Lebanese Forces, was alleged to have conducted military operation against the Syrian military intelligence in Lebanon. The group was mainly formed of elites Lebanese Forces called SADEM, On 19 June 1998, a failed operation revealed the identity of some persons of this group, one of which was a Lebanese Army Captain, Camille Yared. Some other names published in the newspapers then were:

1. Nehme Ziede (SADEM unit, deceased on 19 June 1998)
2. Georges Dib (SADEM unit, deceased on 19 June 1998)
3. Fadi Chahoud (SADEM unit, deceased in August 2000)
4. Naamtallah Moussallem (SADEM unit, managed to escape Lebanon, condemned to death, allegedly one of the resistance network organizers)
5. Abdo Sawaya (SADEM unit, managed to escape Lebanon, condemned to death, allegedly one of the resistance network organizers)

==== After the Cedar Revolution ====
The Lebanese Forces was an active participant in the Cedar Revolution of 2005, when popular protests and international pressure following the assassination of former Prime Minister Rafik al-Hariri combined to force Syria out of Lebanon. In the subsequent parliamentary election held in May and June, the Lebanese Forces formed part of the Rafik Hariri Martyr List, which also included the Future Movement, Popular Socialist Party, the reformed Phalange party, and other anti-Syrian political groups, as well as a brief tactical alliance with Amal and Hezbollah. The tactical alliance with Hizbollah and Amal would soon end; these majority parties and movements would subsequently form the anti-Syrian March 14 Alliance, which stood opposed to the March 8 Coalition backed by Hizbullah, Amal and the Free Patriotic Movement led by General Michel Aoun who had returned to Lebanon. The Lebanese Forces were able to win 6 out of the 8 MPs that were nominated throughout the various regions of the country. Nevertheless, the elections proved to be very significant because for the first time, supporters of the party were freely able to participate in the election process.

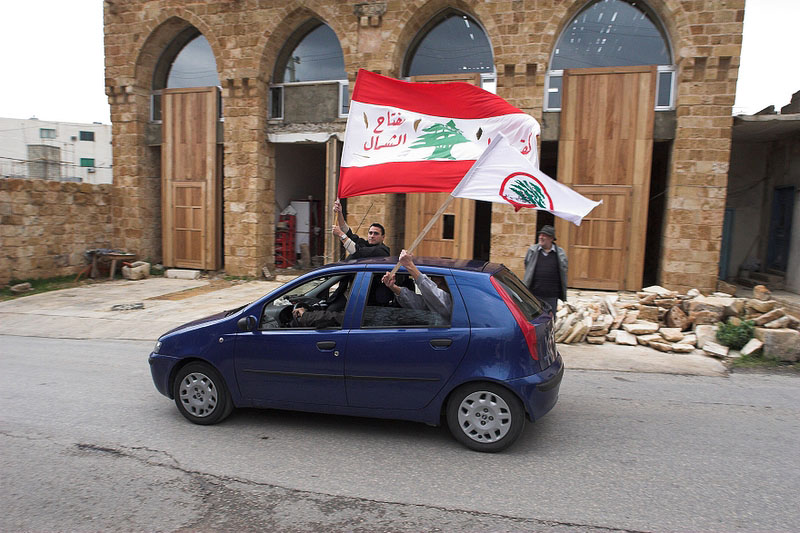
Lebanese Forces supporters

Following the party's new political gains, Samir Geagea was freed on 18 July 2005, after parliament decided to amend all the charges he formerly faced. Since Geagea's release from prison, the Lebanese Forces have been rebuilding much of their former image. Some of these works include reorganizing its members and their families, reopening political facilities, and reestablishing their main presence among the Christians of Lebanon. In addition to rebuilding their image, the Lebanese Forces have also been attempting to reclaim former privately funded facilities, which were seized by the Syrian backed government. Currently, the Lebanese Forces have also been striving to reclaim their rights to the Lebanese Broadcasting Corporation, which was initiated by the party in the mid-1980s.

Since the emancipation of the party's main leader, Samir Geagea, the party has gained new popularity among the Christian population throughout all of Lebanon. In addition, the Lebanese Forces have also been able to attain a great deal of popularity amongst the younger generation, as evidenced by the annual student elections in Lebanese colleges. The Lebanese Forces, along with their other 14 March allies, made additional gains in the elections geared towards the professional bodies of engineers, doctors, lawyers, and even teachers.

==== 2005–2011 political representation ====
The Lebanese Forces held 8 out of the 128 seats of the Lebanese Parliament after the general elections of 2009, and were represented in the Siniora government, formed in July 2005, by the minister of tourism Joseph Sarkis, and then in the second Siniora government, formed in July 2008, by the minister of justice Ibrahim Najjar and the minister of environment Antoine Karam. They are a Christian party within the 14 March Bloc, an anti-Syrian movement.

The Lebanese Forces and its main political representatives strive to re-establish the many Christian rights, which were significantly lessened during Syria's occupation of Lebanon, specifically from 1990 to 2005. Some of the Lebanese Force's other main objectives include formulating a just electoral law, which would enable the Christian population to be represented fairly in local and parliamentary elections. The party has also stressed the idea of reaffirming the powers formerly endowed to the Lebanese president before being lessened in the Taef Agreement.

=== Lebanon Crisis ===
After the 2020 Beirut explosion, on 6 August 2020 the Lebanese Forces Party's executive chairman Samir Geagea was the first politician to visit Beirut and launched from there a relief committee, Ground-0, under the leadership of the former minister May Chidiac to support in rebuilding Beirut. In December 2020, the committee achieved repairing 709 houses, assisted 5300 individuals and 2300 families, distributed 14000 food rations, made 2540 medical consultations, and provided 2030 individuals with medicine. In addition, the committee distributed more than 150 scholarships for Beirut schools' students. Ground-0 Relief Committee launched a petition for an international investigation. The petition was signed by the relatives of the victims and the missing, by the injured as well as by those whose homes, businesses or establishments have been damaged. The document was sent to the UN Secretary General, Antonio Guterres, through his special coordinator for Lebanon, Ján Kubiš, in order to take the necessary steps to appoint an international commission of inquiry.

The Lebanese Forces Party MPs called for an international investigation into the causes of the double explosion at the port of Beirut on 4 August 2020. They asked the Secretary-General of the United Nations, António Guterres, on 22 February 2021 for the creation of an international commission to be established under the United Nations, which would be responsible for carrying out the investigations. The Members of Parliament Georges Okais, Imad Wakim, Eddy Abillammaa and Fady Saad, presented a petition to this effect to the United Nations Special Coordinator in Lebanon, Najat Rochdi.

In October 2021, Samir Geagea, the leader of the Lebanese Forces party, was embroiled in controversy following violent clashes in Beirut on October 14. These clashes erupted during a protest organized by Hezbollah and its ally, the Amal Movement, against Judge Tarek Bitar, who was investigating the 2020 Beirut port explosion. The protest turned deadly when unidentified gunmen fired on the demonstrators, leading to armed confrontations that resulted in at least seven deaths and over 30 injuries. Geagea was summoned by military intelligence to testify about the events, as both Hezbollah and the Amal Movement accused his party of instigating the violence. Geagea denied these allegations, asserting that his supporters acted in self-defense against an attack by Hezbollah loyalists who had vandalized property in the area. On the day he was scheduled to appear, Geagea did not show up, and his supporters protested the summons, blocking roads in support.

Former LF coordinator in Bint Jbeil, Elias Hasrouni, was found in an apparent crash sight on 6 August 2023, but an autopsy later revealed that he was killed and many believed the murder was politically motivated. Samir Geagea declared Hasrouni's death an assassination, pointing the finger at the Iran-backed Hezbollah as the crime occurred deep within areas controlled by them. Politician Samy Gemayel also hinted that Hezbollah might have been behind the killing. The residents of Ain Ebel, one of the few Christian villages in Hezbollah-controlled Bint Jbeil, are largely supportive of Hezbollah's largest political rival, the Lebanese Forces, and the murder of Hasrouni deepened sectarian tensions. In April 2024 Lebanese Forces coordinator in the Byblos District, Pascal Suleiman was kidnapped by armed assailants while traveling in the area of Byblos. Party supporters blocked roads in the area in protest of the kidnapped and many politicians called for investigations and harsh punishments for the assailants. The party called for people to close their shops in the area in condemnation of the kidnapping. Lebanese intelligence arrested multiple Syrians to reveal Suleiman’s whereabouts. The next day he was reported dead by the Lebanese Army and that his body was taken to Syria by Syrian gangs. The party blamed Hezbollah for his killing and said that it was a political murder until proven otherwise.

==== 2022 general elections ====
The Lebanese Forces presented 18 direct members along with many other allies in every electoral district, with the exception South III, during the elections with a large anti-Hezbollah sentiment. The Lebanese Forces saw some withdrawal of candidates specifically in Shia dominated areas which was blamed at Hezbollah and the Amal Movement for placing pressure on Shia March 14 candidates. LF formed an electoral alliance with Qassem Daoud (brother of Amal Martyr Daoud Daoud) in Tyre/Zahrani-East Saida (South II). Lebanese Forces secured 19 seats, making the LF the largest Christian-based party in parliament and the Strong republic the largest bloc in parliament with an additional 3 from Ashraf Rifi's Bloc and Camille Dory Chamoun of the National Liberal Party.

==== 2024 fall of the Assad regime ====
The LF has always been a staunch critic of the Assad regimes's involvement in Lebanese politics. In December 2024, the fall of Assad’s Baathist regime in Syria was a subject of celebration among the LF’s supporters. Samir Geagea said in an interview: "No matter how the situation in Syria will be after Assad, it’s impossible that it will be worse than Assad."

==== 2025 government of Nawaf Salam ====
In February 2025, Prime Minister Nawaf Salam announced his government, which consists of 24 ministers. The Lebanese Forces has four ministers: Foreign Minister Youssef Rajji; Energy Minister Joe Saddi; Telecommunications Minister Charles Al-Hajj and Industry Minister Joe Issa Al-Khoury. Kamal Chehadeh, Minister of Displaced Affairs and State Minister for Information Technology and Artificial Intelligence, is also close to the LF.

== Parliamentary activities ==
After securing the most seats in parliament after the 2022 elections, Samir Geagea emphasized his pledge not to vote for 30-year incumbent speaker Nabih Berri, citing corruption in the Bloc he leads.

=== Current deputies ===
Name	Election Area	Religion
Ghassan Hasbani	Beirut I	Greek Orthodox
Jihad Pakradouni	Beirut I	Armenian Orthodox
Elias Khoury	North II – Tripoli	Maronite
Fadi Karam	North III – Koura	Greek Orthodox
Sethrida Geagea	North III- Bsharri	Maronite
Ghayath Yazbeck	North III – Batroun	Maronite
Ziad Hawat	Mount Lebanon I – Jbeil	Maronite
Chawki Daccache	Mount Lebanon I – Kesserwan	Maronite
Melhem Riachi	Mount Lebanon II – Metn	Greek Catholic
Razi El Hage	Mount Lebanon II – Metn	Maronite
Pierre Bou Assi	Mount Lebanon III – Baabda	Maronite
Camille Chamoun	Mount Lebanon III – Baabda	Maronite
Nazih Matta	Mount Lebanon 4 – Aley	Greek Orthodox
Georges Adwan	Mount Lebanon 4 – Chouf	Maronite
Ghada Ayoub	South I – Jezzine	Greek Catholic
Saiid Sleiman Asmar	South I – Jezzine	Maronite
Elias Estephan	Bekaa I – Zahle	Greek Orthodox
Georges Okais	Bekaa I – Zahle	Greek Catholic
Antoine Habchi	Bekaa III – Baalbek-Hermel	Maronite

=== List of draft laws proposed in parliament ===
Date	MP	Name	Detail
02-06-2012	Elie Keyrouz	abolish death penalty in Lebanon	The death penalty should be eliminated in all instances within Lebanese legislation, particularly in the Penal Code and the Military Penal Code. Instead, it should be substituted with the punishment of life imprisonment with hard labor or life imprisonment, depending on the nature and circumstances of the committed crime.
29-07-2016	Elie Keyrouz	abolish Lebanese rape-marriage law Article 522	Introducing a law to abolish Article 522 of the Lebanese Penal Code, which allows the perpetrator of crimes of assault on honor to escape prosecution if he marries the victim.
02-08-2023	Melhem Riachi, Georges Okeis	Legalize optional civil marriage in Lebanon	The couple is free to choose any municipality for their marriage ceremony, as long as the municipality has at least 15 members. Their marriage will be legally recognized and governed by the court within the same jurisdiction. Non-Lebanese have the right to contract a civil marriage on Lebanese territory in accordance with this law.

== LF internal elections ==
Lebanese Forces internal elections to elect the party President, Vice President and members of the Executive Committee take place every 6 years since 2023.

Members of the Executive Committee are divided as follow:

- 1 member from Beirut
- 3 members from Mount Lebanon
- 3 members from North Lebanon
- 2 members from Bekaa
- 1 member from South Lebanon
- 1 member representing Lebanese diaspora

=== 2023 ===
The first internal elections took place on October 29, 2023. 31,000 were eligible to vote but only 18,321 voted (58.9%).

==== Leadership ====
Position	Candidate	Result
President	Samir Geagea	won by acclamation
Vice President	Georges Adwan	won by acclamation

==== Executive Committee ====
Area	Candidate	Result
Beirut	Daniel Sbiro	12,511
Beirut	Riad Akel	5,199
Mount Lebanon	Edy Abi Lamaa	12,483
Mount Lebanon	Georges Aoun	3,927
Mount Lebanon	Rachid Khalil	1,843
Mount Lebanon	Charly Kossaify	1,684
Mount Lebanon	Toni Karam	9,856
Mount Lebanon	Adel Haber	588
Mount Lebanon	Fady Zarifeh	8,678
Mount Lebanon	Maya Zaghrini	8,904
Mount Lebanon	Michel Abou Gebrayel	455
North Lebanon	Antoine Zahra	17,209
North Lebanon	Yvonne El Hachem	2,146
North Lebanon	Elie Keyrouz	13,288
North Lebanon	Fadi Boulos	3,005
North Lebanon	Wehbe Katicha	10,485
North Lebanon	Youssef Hitti	3,485
Bekaa	Bachir Matar	won by acclamation
Bekaa	Michel Tannoury	won by acclamation
South Lebanon	Assaad Saiid	9,928
South Lebanon	Elias Abi Tayeh	5,857
South Lebanon	Bassam Nachef	1,811
Diaspora	Antoine Baroud	3,652
Diaspora	Pierre El Hage	963
Diaspora	Joseph Jbeily	12,889

== Cabinet participation ==
List of Ministers
Name	Cabinet	Position
Joseph Sarkis	2005–2008	Tourism
Antoine Karam	2008–2009	Environment
Ibrahim Najjar	2008–2009	Justice
Ibrahim Najjar	2009–2011	Justice
Salim Wardeh	2009–2011	Culture
Ghassan Hasbani	2016–2019	Deputy PM and Health minister
Melhem Riachi	2016–2019	Information
Pierre Bou Assi	2016–2019	Social Affairs
Ghassan Hasbani	2019–2020	Deputy PM
Richard Kouyoumjian	2019–2020	Social Affairs
May Chidiac	2019–2020	Culture
Camille Abousleiman	2019–2020	Labor
Youssef Raggi	2025–present	Foreign Affairs
Joe Saddi	2025–present	Energy And Water
Kamal Chehade	2025–present	Displaced and IT & AI
Joe Issa Al-Khoury	2025–present	Industry

== Election summary ==
Election year	# of overall votes	% of overall vote	# of overall seats won	+/–
2005	(#6)	4.68%	6 / 128	New
2009	(#6)		8 / 128	▲2
2018	168,960 (#4)	9.61%	15 / 128	▲7
2022	210,324 (#1)	11.63%	19 / 128	▲4

== See also ==
- East Beirut canton
- 1982 Iranian diplomats kidnapping
- 2012 Koura by-elections

== Sources ==
- Antoine Abraham, The Lebanon war, Greenwood Publishing Group 1996. ISBN 0275953890, 9780275953898.
- Claire Hoy and Victor Ostrovsky, By Way of Deception: The Making and Unmaking of a Mossad Officer, St. Martin's Press, New York 1990. ISBN 0-9717595-0-2
- Denise Ammoun, Histoire du Liban contemporain: Tome 2 1943–1990, Fayard, Paris 2005. ISBN 978-2213615219 (in French)
- Edgar O'Ballance, Civil War in Lebanon, 1975–92, Palgrave Macmillan, 1998. ISBN 978-0312215934
- Fawwaz Traboulsi, Identités et solidarités croisées dans les conflits du Liban contemporain; Chapitre 12: L'économie politique des milices: le phénomène mafieux, Thèse de Doctorat d'Histoire – 1993, Université de Paris VIII, 2007. (in French)
- Hazem Saghieh, Ta’rib al-Kata’eb al-Lubnaniyya: al-Hizb, al-sulta, al-khawf, Beirut: Dar al-Jadid, 1991. (in Arabic).
- Jonathan Randall, Going All the Way: Christian Warlords, Israeli Adventurers and the War in Lebanon, Vintage Books, New York 1984 (revised edition).
- Robert Fisk, Pity the Nation: Lebanon at War, London: Oxford University Press, ISBN 0192801309 (3rd ed. 2001).
- Samir Kassir, La Guerre du Liban: De la dissension nationale au conflit régional, Éditions Karthala/CERMOC, Paris 1994. (in French)
- Samuel M. Katz, Lee E. Russel, and Ron Volstad, Armies in Lebanon 1982–84, Men-at-Arms series 165, Osprey Publishing, London 1985. ISBN 0-85045-602-9
- Samuel M. Katz and Ron Volstad, Arab Armies of the Middle East Wars 2, Men-at-arms series 194, Osprey Publishing, London 1988. ISBN 0-85045-800-5
- Matthew S. Gordon, The Gemayels (World Leaders Past & Present), Chelsea House Publishers, 1988. ISBN 1-55546-834-9
