= Joseph Sarkis =

Lebanese politician

Joseph Sarkis (Arabic: جوزيف سركيس; born 1949) is a Lebanese politician and former Minister of Tourism.

He is a prominent member of the Lebanese Forces (LF). From 1988 to 1994 he was member of the Kataeb Political Bureau. He distanced himself from that party after its leadership took a pro-Syrian stance. He became an activist in the LF despite it being banned. In 1998, he was elected to the municipal council of Beirut as the LF representative. In 2002, he became the Lebanese Forces official responsible for Beirut and he became one of the signatories to the reestablishment of the Lebanese Forces Party at the Ministry of Interior in 2005.

Sarkis is a civil engineer with a degree from the Ecole superieure des ingénieurs de beyrouth.
