= Second cabinet of Saad Hariri =

Current government of Lebanon

Second Cabinet of Saad Hariri
- Cabinet of Lebanon

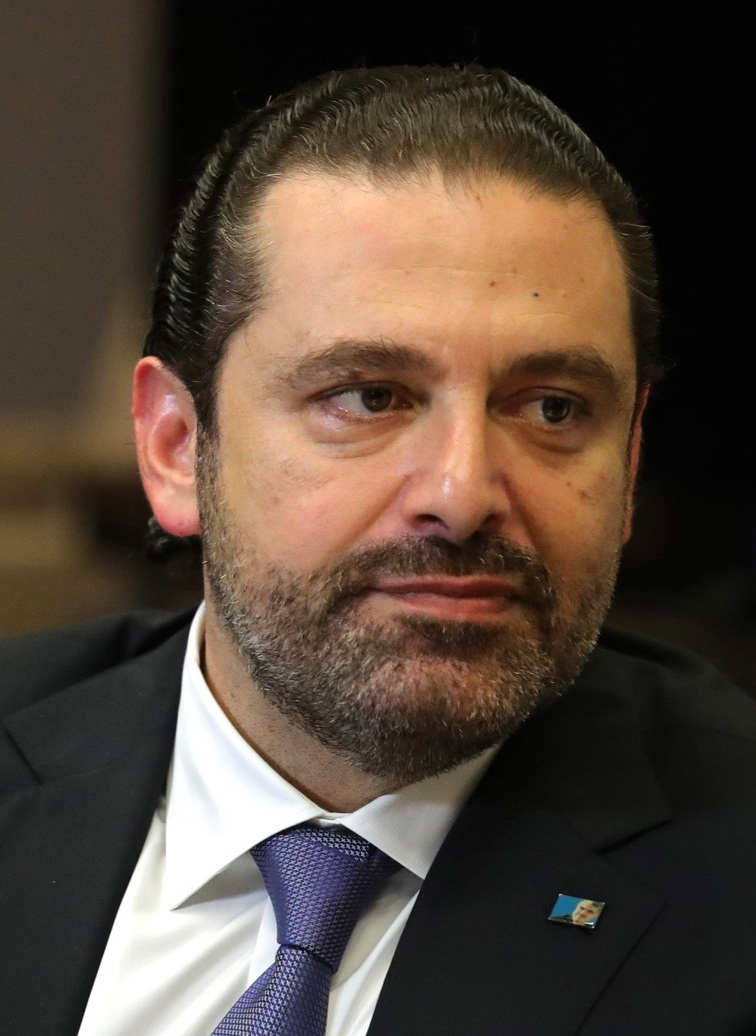
- Saad Hariri
- Date formed: 18 December 2016
- Date dissolved: 31 January 2019

People and organisations
- President: Michel Aoun
- Head of government: Saad Hariri
- Deputy head of government: Ghassan Hasbani
- No. of ministers: 30
- Total no. of members: 30

History
- Predecessor: Cabinet of Tammam Salam
- Successor: Third cabinet of Saad Hariri

On 18 December 2016, a new cabinet was formed under Prime Minister Saad Hariri. There were 30 ministers in this cabinet. The government was automatically resigned and assumed a caretaker capacity after the 2018 Lebanese general election.

== Composition ==
Lebanese government of December 2016
Portfolio (Ministry)	Minister	Political affiliation	Religious Affiliation
President Michel Aoun and Change and Reform Bloc Share (10/30)
Minister of Defense	Yaacoub Sarraf	Free Patriotic Movement	Greek Orthodox
Minister of Justice	Salim Jreissati	Free Patriotic Movement	Greek Catholic
State Minister for Presidential Affairs	Pierre Raffoul	Free Patriotic Movement	Maronite
Minister of Environment	Tarek Khatib	Free Patriotic Movement	Sunni
State Minister for Combating Corruption	Nicolas Tueni	Free Patriotic Movement	Greek Orthodox
Minister of Foreign Affairs and Emigrates	Gebran Bassil	Free Patriotic Movement	Maronite
Minister of Energy and Water	Cesar Abi Khalil	Free Patriotic Movement	Maronite
Minister of Economy and Trade	Raed Khoury	Free Patriotic Movement	Greek Orthodox
Minister of Displaced	Talal Arslan	Lebanese Democratic Party	Druze
Minister of Tourism	Avedis Gidanian	Tashnag Party	Armenian Orthodox
Lebanese Forces (4/30)
Deputy Prime Minister and Public Health	Ghassan Hasbani	Lebanese Forces	Greek Orthodox
Minister of Information	Melhem Riachi	Lebanese Forces	Greek Catholic
Minister of Social Affairs	Pierre Abi Assi	Lebanese Forces	Maronite
State Minister for Planning Affairs	Michel Pharaon	Independent	Greek Catholic
Prime Minister Saad Hariri Shares (7/30)
Prime Minister	Saad Hariri	Future Movement	Sunni
Minister of Interior and Municipalities	Nouhad Machnouk	Future Movement	Sunni
Minister of Telecommunications	Jamal el-Jarrah	Future Movement	Sunni
Minister of Labour	Mohammad Kabarra	Future Movement	Sunni
Minister of State for Refugees Affairs	Moein Merhebi	Future Movement	Sunni
Minister of Culture	Ghattas Khoury	Future Movement	Maronite
Minister of State for Women's Affairs	Jean Ogassapian	Future Movement	Armenian Catholic
Democratic Gathering Bloc (2/30)
Minister of Education and Higher Learning	Marwan Hamadeh	Progressive Socialist Party	Druze
State Minister for Human Rights Affairs	Ayman Shkeir	Progressive Socialist Party	Druze
Amal Movement (3/30)
Minister of Finance	Ali Hassan Khalil	Amal Movement	Shia
Minister of Agriculture	Ghazi Zaiter	Amal Movement	Shia
State Minister for Administrative Reform	Inaya Ezeddine	Amal Movement	Shia
Loyalty to Resistance Bloc (2/30)
Minister of Industry	Hussein Hajj Hassan	Hezbollah	Shia
Minister of Sports and Youth	Muhammad Fneish	Hezbollah	Shia
Others (2/30)
Minister of Public Works and Transport	Youssef Finianos	Marada Movement	Maronite
State Minister for Parliamentary Affairs	Ali Qanso	Syrian Social Nationalist Party	Shia

Preceded by Lebanese government of April 2013	List of Lebanese governments	Succeeded by Lebanese government of January 2019
