= Pierre Bou Assi =

Lebanese politician and former minister

- بيار بوعاصي
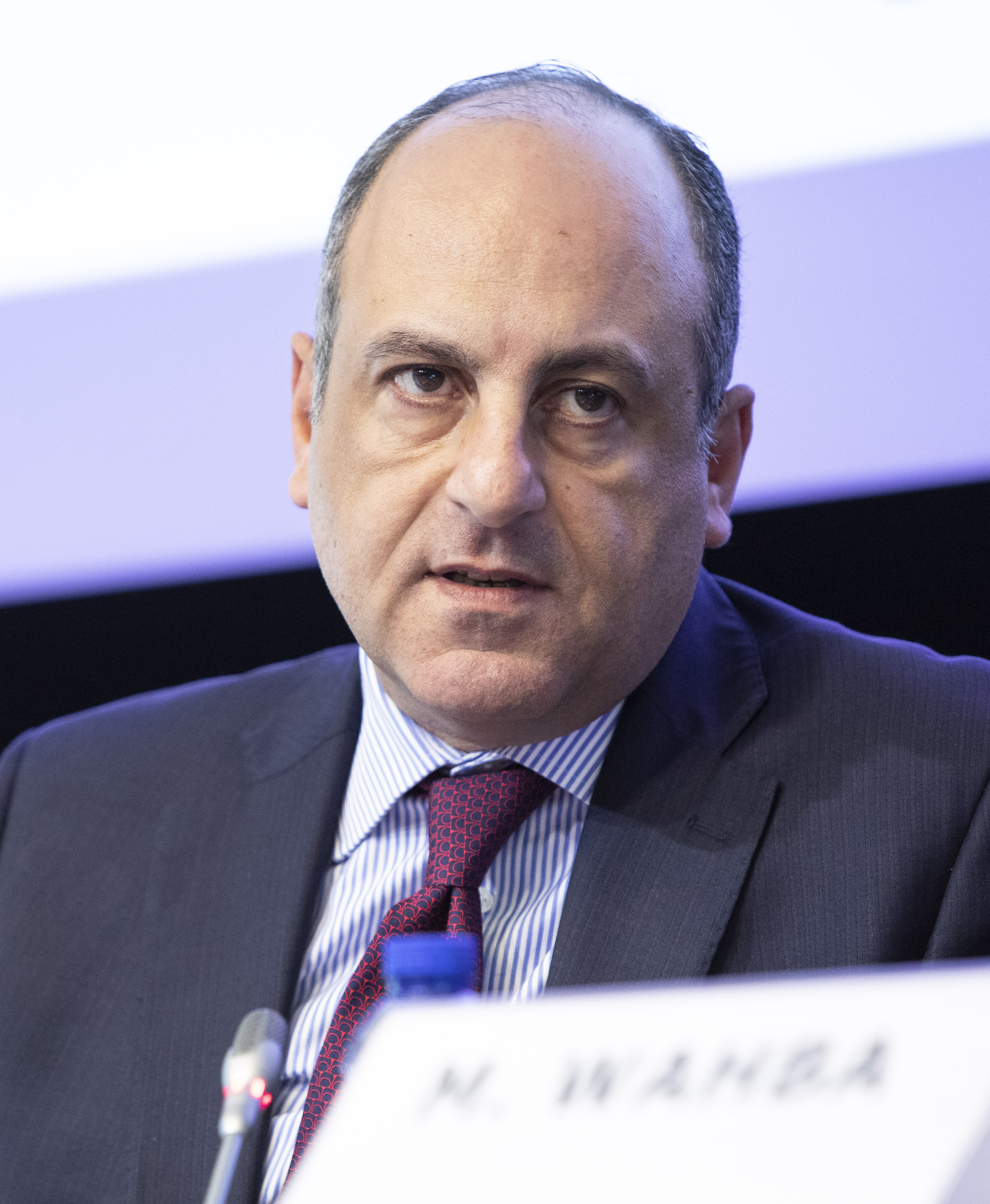
- Bou Assi in 2018

Minister of Social Affairs
- In office 18 December 2016 – 31 January 2019
- Prime Minister: Saad Hariri
- Preceded by: Rashid Derbass
- Succeeded by: Richard Kouyoumdjian

Member of the Lebanese Parliament
- Incumbent
- Assumed office 15 May 2018
- Constituency: Mount Lebanon III (Baabda District)

Personal details
- Born: Pierre Rachid Bou Assi; 1966 (age 59–60)
- Party: Lebanese Forces
- Other political affiliations: Strong Republic
- Cabinet: Hariri II

Pierre Rachid Bou Assi (Arabic: بيار بوعاصي; born 1966) is a Lebanese politician. He currently serves as a member of the Lebanese Parliament representing the Baabda District, and was appointed as Minister of Social Affairs on 18 December 2016 until 2019.

== Early life ==
Bou Assi was born in the town of Abadiyeh, Baabda District, Lebanon, to a Maronite Christian family. He studied at the Collège Mont La Salle, and joined the Lebanese Forces party as a student at the Jesuit University in 1985. He left for France where he studied business administration and assumed many jobs including working at a wine trading company.

== Career ==
In France, Bou Assi helped organize local demonstrations amidst the Syrian occupation of Lebanon. He returned to Lebanon in 2011, and was appointed head of the Foreign Relations Department of the Lebanese Forces party.

After the resignation of Tammam Salam, Aoun designated Saad Hariri to form a new cabinet following binding parliamentary consultations. This came as a result of the consensus that led to the election of Aoun, and it was the second time Hariri held the position. The cabinet consisted of 30 ministers as a national unity government. On 28 December, it won the confidence of the parliament with an 87 MPs majority. Bou Assi was named Minister of Social Affairs.

Bou Assi ran in the 2018 Lebanese elections under the "Baabda Unity & Development" list endorsed by the Lebanese Forces and Progressive Socialist Party. He won with 11,498. He ran again in 2022 under the "Baabda Al Seyada Wal Karar" list and was able to win his seat with 14,756 votes.

During Hezbollah's involvement in the Gaza war many politicians of long established Christian parties in Lebanon took a stance against Hezbollah's involvement. Pierre Bou Assi criticized the involvement by highlighting the kidnapping of two IDF soldiers which led to the 2006 Lebanon war saying, "Hassan Nasrallah promised, in early July, that the summer would be quiet and thriving—but a few days later, Hezbollah kidnapped two Israeli soldiers and the July war broke out".

In June 2024, Mohammad Raad, the leader of Hezbollah's Loyalty to the Resistance Bloc in the Lebanese parliament, accused some "selfish" Lebanese of caring only about their comfort and relaxation, and criticized them for "going to the beach and nightclubs while the south is under attack," which "destroys" the nation. Bou Assi responded to Raad: "All of Lebanon is collapsing due to your policies and your illusory and destructive divine victories. Have you strengthened any economic or social resilience in Lebanon? Do you think your Iranian rockets will feed the people?”

== Personal life ==
Pierre Bou Assi is a Maronite Christian. He was previously married to Rima Husseini, a Shiite Muslim, but the couple eventually divorced.
