= Salim Sayegh =

Lebanese politician and academic

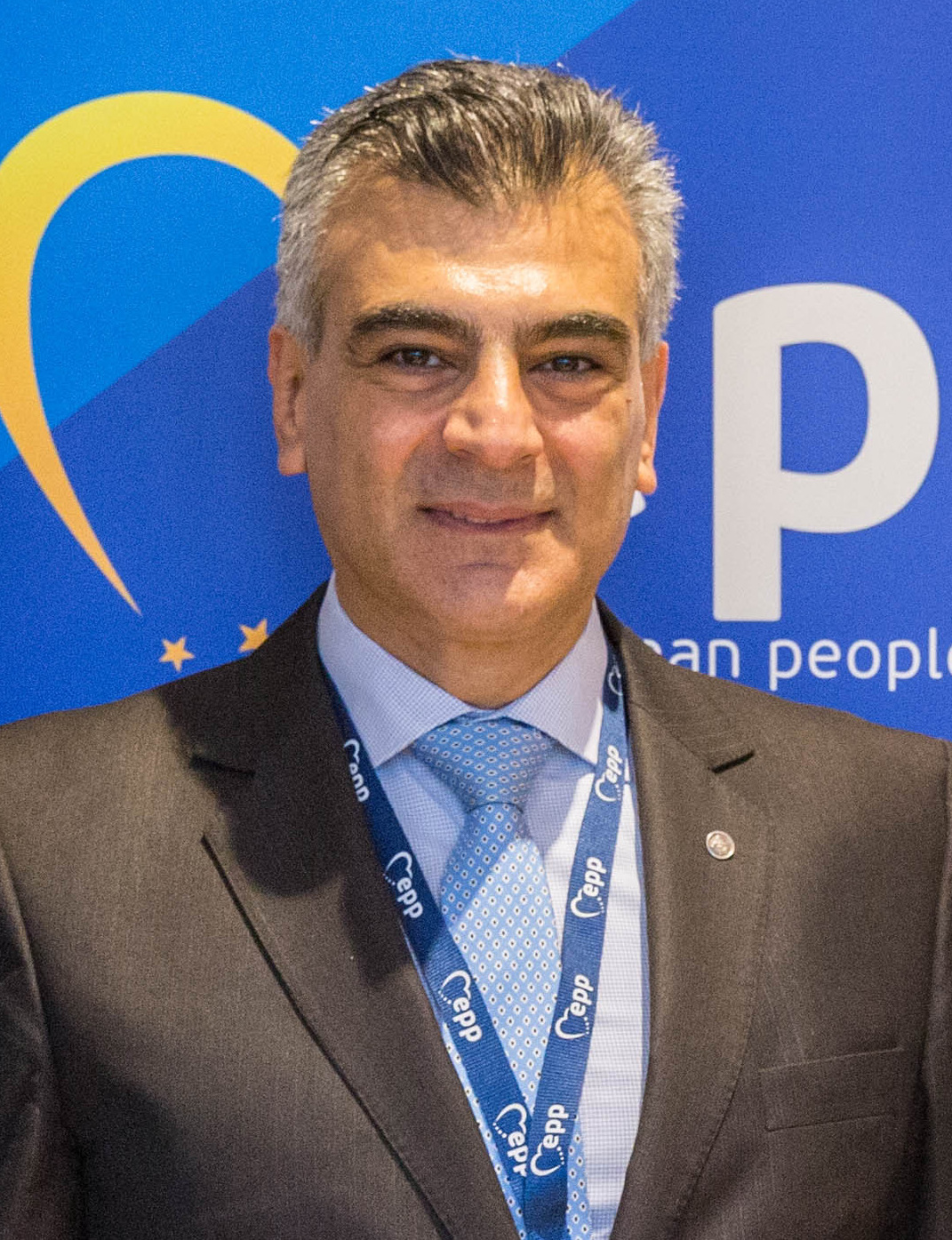
- Sayegh in 2016

Member of the Lebanese Parliament
- Incumbent
- Assumed office 17 May 2022
- Constituency: Keserwan (2022)

Minister of Social Affairs
- In office 9 November 2009 – 13 June 2011
- Prime Minister: Saad Hariri
- Preceded by: Mario Aoun
- Succeeded by: Wael Abou Faour

Personal details
- Party: Kataeb Party
- Education: Lebanese American University; University of Paris

Salim Sayegh is a Lebanese academic and politician who served as Minister of Social Affairs from 2009 to 2011. He has been serving as a member of the Lebanese Parliament since 2022.

== Early life and education ==
Sayegh was born into a Maronite family. He graduated from Lebanese American University in 1983. He received a master's degree in international relations and diplomacy in 1989. He also holds a PhD in law from the University of Paris in 1992.

== Career ==
Sayegh worked as professor at the University of South Paris from 1993 to 2009 and also, served as the director of university's conflict resolution center during the same period. He is a member of the Kataeb party and was elected as second vice president in February 2008 when Amine Gemayel became the president of the party. He has also been a member of the party's political bureau and head of the foreign affairs committee in the party since 2008,

Sayegh was appointed minister of social affairs in the cabinet led by Prime Minister Saad Hariri on 9 November 2009. Sayegh resigned from his party post following his appointment as minister. He was among the members of the committee that was charged with drafting the government program. Sayegh's tenure lasted until June 2011, and he was replaced by Wael Abou Faour as minister.

In addition, he is a member of World Bank board for social politics in the MENA region.

In his interview on LBCI February 24, 2025, Sayegh has called for transforming Hezbollah into a civilian organization, arguing that the group can no longer claim autonomy from state control. He criticized Hezbollah for not displaying Lebanese national symbols—highlighting the absence of Lebanese flags at the funeral of its former leaders, Hassan Nasrallah and Hashem Safieddine—and emphasized that public spaces like the airport road should be secured by state forces rather than partisan groups. Sayegh also condemned Iran’s continued influence in Lebanon, urging Tehran to resolve its issues with the U.S. and Gulf states, and proposed that the United Nations develop a program to dismantle Hezbollah’s military infrastructure while integrating its fighters into the national framework with support for jobs, social security, and housing. Additionally, he stressed the inevitability of justice in the Beirut Port explosion case, calling on key government figures to expedite legal proceedings.

Political offices
Preceded by Mario Aoun	Minister of Social Affairs; 2009 – 2011	Succeeded by Wael Abou Faour
