= May Chidiac =

Lebanese journalist and politician

Doctor May Chidiac
- مي شدياق
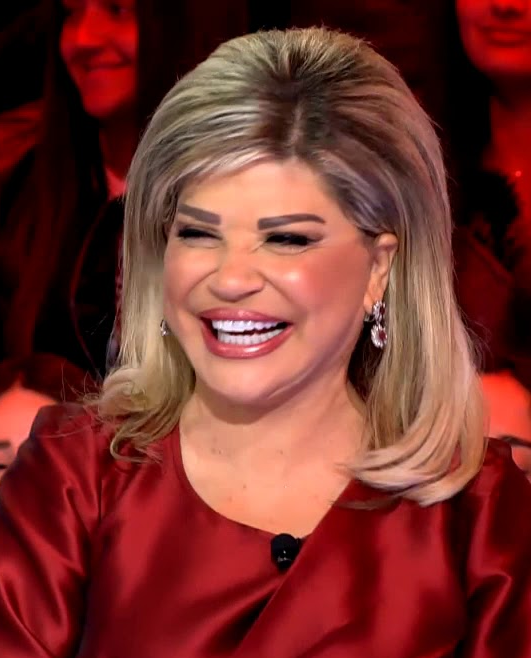
- May Chidiac in 2019

State Minister for Administrative Development
- In office January 31, 2019 – October 19, 2019
- President: Michel Aoun
- Prime Minister: Saad Hariri
- Preceded by: Inaya Ezeddine
- Succeeded by: Damianos Kattar

Head of the GROUND-0 Beirut Relief Committee
- Incumbent
- Assumed office August 4, 2020

Founder and President of May Chidiac Foundation (MCF)
- Incumbent
- Assumed office 2011

Head of the Press Division at the Lebanese Embassy in Bern-Switzerland
- In office 1991–1990

Editor, reporter and News Anchor at LBC
- In office 1985 – September 25, 2005

Personal details
- Born: May Chidiac; June 20, 1963 (age 63) Rmeil, Beirut, Lebanon
- Party: Lebanese Forces
- Education: Saint Famille Française School Gemayze-Fanar (General Sciences).; Master's degree in journalism from the Lebanese University.; PhD. Information and Communication Sciences from Paris 2 Panthéon-Assas University with honorable distinction.

May Chidiac (Arabic: مي شدياق) (born in Beirut, Lebanon, 20 June 1963) is a journalist and former Lebanese Minister of State for Administrative Development.

== Early life and education ==
Chidiac was born in Beirut in 1963. She holds a Ph.d in "Sciences de L'Information et de la Communication" with high distinction from Université Panthéon-Assas Paris II. Since 1997, she has served as a Professor of Radio/TV at Notre Dame University-Louaize. She has participated in various academic forums and has lectured at international institutions such as the University of Sydney.

== Career ==
In 1985, Chidiac began her career as a journalist at the Lebanese Broadcasting Corporation (LBC) and one of the station's television anchors. Over the next twenty-five years, she went on to hold several positions such as: editor, radio host, and news anchor, and worked in both Lebanese and international media.

From 1989 to 1990, Chidiac served as Head of the Press Division at the Lebanese Embassy in Bern, Switzerland. Following the end of the Lebanese Civil War, she criticized Syria's continued troop presence in Lebanon, stating that the Taif Accords stipulated Syria's withdrawal from Lebanon. She also worked as a real estate agent between 1994 and 1998.

On the day she was attacked, after the Cedar Revolution and Syria's troop withdrawal from Lebanon earlier that year, she hosted a talk show in which she criticized what she called Syria's continuous involvement in Lebanon's affairs and expressed concern about further violence ahead of the UN report on the death of the former prime minister, Rafik Hariri. On 3 February 2009, she announced her resignation on her LBC show Bi Kol Jor'a.

Chidiac was the Minister of State of the Administrative Reform of the government of Saad Hariri since January 31, 2019. On October 19, 2019, May Chidiac and her 3 others colleagues from the Lebanese Forces resigned from the government after a third day of protests across the country against tax increases and alleged official corruption. She was Professor of Journalism and Radio/Television at the Notre Dame University–Louaize (NDU) since 1997. She is the Founder and President of the two NGOs; May Chidiac Foundation (MCF) and its affiliated Media Institute (MCF-MI) since 2011. The Foundation organizes two annual conferences. After over 220 people were killed and over 5,000 were wounded in the 2020 Beirut explosion, the Lebanese Forces President Samir Geagea appointed Dr. May Chidiac as Head of the GROUND-0 Beirut Relief Committee, on August 6, 2020.

She was part of Women On The Front Lines (WOFL) Lebanon &WOFL MENA Chapter, Jordan.

She is the Founder of the Academy of Leadership & Applied Communication (ALAC), certified by the Lebanese government by the decree N° 2844/2016.

== Assassination attempt ==
In 2004, following an interview with Maronite Patriarch Bechara Boutros Al-Rahi, she received a death threat that was sent to her by Rustum Ghazaleh, a Syrian military and intelligence officer. The message came to her via a Lebanese political figure, Ghazaleh said he would “drink her blood.”

Chidiac was seriously injured on 25 September 2005, by a car bomb in Jounieh, Lebanon. The bomb, which nearly killed her, was a one-pound device, detonated as she entered her car. Her left leg below the knee was blown off, her left arm was severely injured and later amputated, and her hair and clothes were set on fire. She was in stable condition following the assassination attempt. According to reports obtained by the committee to protect journalists, half a kilogram of explosives was placed in Chidiac's Range Rover. The explosion blew off the driver-side door, which was recovered more than 30 feet away from Chidiac's car.

The blast was one of a series of bombings in Lebanon mostly targeting critics of Syria, but including the centrist Lebanese defense minister, Elias Murr. One other journalist, Samir Kassir, and anti-Syrian politicians including George Hawi and Gebran Tueni, editor and publisher of the daily newspaper, An-Nahar, were killed in these attacks. Their assassinations and the attempt on Chidiac were linked to Unit 121, which executed many assassinations in Lebanon, dating back to the late 80s. After months of treatment and numerous surgeries in Beirut and Paris, May appeared on TV on 25 May 2006 and stated that she planned to return to journalism. On 27 January 2006, Chidiac announced her candidacy for the vacated Maronite seat in Lebanon's Baabda-Aley district in a televised interview.

On 12 July 2006, May Chidiac returned to Beirut. She first visited the shrine of Saint Charbel, in the Byblos region, a place she had been the day before the attack. She participated in a mass celebrated by the superior of the monastery, Fr. Tannous Nehme. In 2007, she published her biography, Le Ciel m'attendra (French for Heaven Can Wait)

== Awards and honors ==
On 27 October 2006, May Chidiac received one of the three Courage in Journalism Awards presented by the International Women's Media Foundation.

In June 2006, she received the "CRANS Montana Foundation Award" for Freedom of Expression offered by his Royal Highness Prince Albert De Monaco, Monte Carlo.

On 3 May 2006, UNESCO awarded the UNESCO/Guillermo Cano World Press Freedom Prize to May Chidiac in recognition of her courage in defending and promoting freedom of the press.

In December 2007, May Chidiac was honored in the frame of "She Made It" by the Museum of Television and Radio, New York City.

In April 2006, she received an Honorary Award, presented by his Royal Highness Prince Sheikh Mohammed Bin Zayed Al Nahyan, Crown Prince of Abu Dhabi.

On 3 May 2007, the former French president, Jacques Chirac awarded May Chidiac the Legion of Honour at the Elysée Palace in Paris. Chirac described Chidiac as a "symbol of free speech in Lebanon."

In March 2008, she was honored as a prominent and audacious figure in politics and journalism during the Olympe De Gouge event, at Montauban France. In December 2010, The "Prix Verité" ("Truth Prize") was awarded to Chidiac for Le Ciel M'attendra in 2007 in La Ville de Cannet, Cannes, France.

In 2010, Chidiac was named one of the International Press Institute's World Press Freedom Heroes.

Chidiac has participated in significant symposiums and colloquiums such as the UN's Resolution 1325 Symposium in Vienna, the University of Sidney Ideas Talk, the International Press Institute Congress in South Africa and Jordan, UNESCO International Colloquium in Beirut, and UNESCO's Global Forum on Media and Gender in Thailand, its former Regional Forum for Media Development, as well as its Symposium for Freedom of Expression.

In 2016, Chidiac was awarded with an honorary doctorate from the American University of Science and Technology.

== Publications ==
- "Le Ciel M'attendra" (Heaven Can Wait) in 2007 awarded the "Prix Vérité" in Le Cannet, France.
- "La Television Mise à Nu" (Influence of politics on the television scene) in 2014. The book was awarded the "Phoenix Prize" for literature.

== See also ==
- List of people who survived assassination attempts
- Syrian occupation of Lebanon
