= Wael Abou Faour =

Lebanese politician

- وائل ابو فاعور
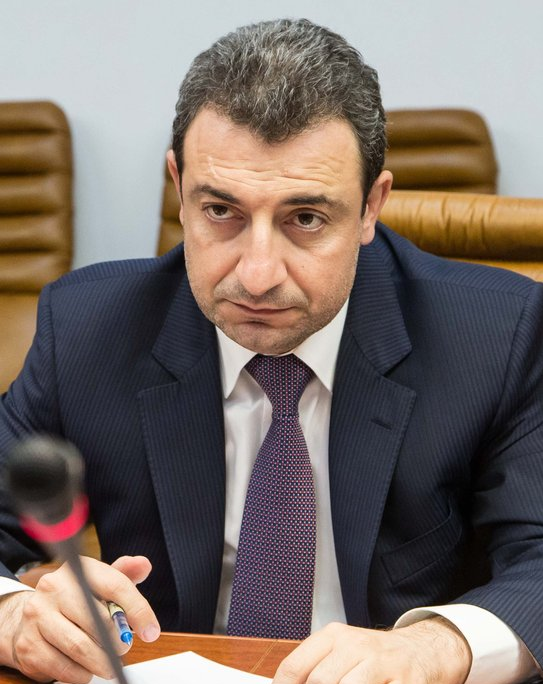
- Abou Faour in 2015

Minister of Industry
- In office 31 January 2019 – 20 January 2020
- Prime Minister: Saad Hariri
- Preceded by: Hussein Hajj Hassan
- Succeeded by: Imad Hoballah

Minister of Public Health
- In office 15 February 2014 – 18 December 2016
- Prime Minister: Tammam Salam
- Preceded by: Ali Hassan Khalil
- Succeeded by: Ghassan Hasbani

Minister of Social Affairs
- In office 13 June 2011 – 15 February 2014
- Prime Minister: Najib Mikati
- Preceded by: Salim Sayegh
- Succeeded by: Rachid Derbass

Personal details
- Born: 5 October 1972 (age 53) Khalwat al-Kfeir, Hasbaya District, Lebanon
- Party: Progressive Socialist Party
- Spouse: Zeina Hamedeh
- Children: Leen, Sara, Adham, Walid
- Education: American University of Beirut

Wael Abou Faour (born 1972) is a Lebanese politician who served as the Minister of Health.

== Early life ==
Faour was born in 1974 into a Lebanese Druze family. He is a graduate of the American University of Beirut where he received a bachelor's degree in Business Administration. Abou Faour is married to Zeina Hamedeh and has two daughters Sara and Leen with twin boys Adham and Walid.

== Career ==
Faour is a senior member of the Progressive Socialist Party and one of the close aides of party's leader Walid Jumblatt. He was first elected deputy in 2005 as part of the Democratic Gathering bloc representing the Western Bekaa, Rashaya. He served at the following parliamentary committees: agriculture and tourism, youth and sports and information technology. On 11 July 2008, he was appointed state minister in the cabinet led by Prime Minister Fouad Siniora. Faour was appointed minister of social affairs in the cabinet headed by Prime Minister Najib Mikati in July 2011.

Wael Abou Faour revealed during a press conference on 11 November 2014 that many popular restaurants and food chains across Lebanon have been violating food safety rules, which brought about the start of a food safety campaign.

In 2020, Abu Faour sued Wassef El Harakeh, after the latter accused Abou Faour of smuggling cancer medicine to As-Suwayda, Syria during his tenure as Minister of Public Health, which caused shortage in the medicaments for the Lebanese citizens.

Political offices
Preceded by Salim Sayegh	Minister of Social Affairs; 2011 – present	Incumbent
