= Fady Saad =

Lebanese politician

- فادي سعد

Member of Parliament

Assembly Member for Batroun district
- In office 2018–2022

Personal details
- Political party: Lebanese Forces

Fady Saad (Arabic: فادي سعد) is a Lebanese politician who serves as member of parliament from 2018 until 2022 representing the Batroun district. He is a member of the Lebanese Forces and its parliamentary bloc, the Strong Republic.
