= 2012 Koura by-elections =

Koura By-elections 2012

- Turnout: 47%
Candidate	Fadi Karam	Walid al-Azar
Party	Lebanese Forces	SSNP
Alliance	14 March	8 March
Percentage	12,412 (51.80%)	11,141 (46.50%)

The 2012 Koura by-elections were held in Koura, Lebanon on Sunday July 15, 2012 to fill the Greek Orthodox parliamentary seat left vacant after the death of LF MP Farid Habib who died in May 2012.

== Election ==
The following 6 candidates stood for election:

- Fadi Karam backed by Lebanese Forces and Future Movement
- Walid al-Azar backed by SSNP, Marada, Free Patriotic Movement and Hezbollah
- Jean Mufarrej
- Naim Ojami
- Youssef Skaff
- George Mattar

Lebanese Forces candidate Fadi Karam won the by-elections in the district of Koura with 12,412 votes while Syrian Social National Party’s Walid al-Azar received 11,141 votes.

== Results ==
Candidate	Votes	%	Party	Alliance
Fadi Karam	12,412	51.80	Lebanese Forces	14 March
Walid al-Azar	11,141	46.50	SSNP	8 March
Jean Mufarrej	311	1.296	Independent	
Naim Ojaimi	94	0.40	Independent	
Youssef Skaff	1	0.004	Independent	
George Mattar	0	0.00	Independent	

== Aftermath ==
Interior Minister Marwan Charbel said that yesterday's peaceful election day is a triumph for democracy embodied by Koura's voters and politicians.
