= Ministry of Social Affairs (Lebanon) =

Government ministry of Lebanon

Coordinates: 33°52′39″N 35°31′2″E

Lebanese Republic Ministry of Social Affairs وزارة الشؤون الإجتماعية
- Logo of the ministry.

Agency overview
- Formed: 1993; 33 years ago
- Jurisdiction: Government of Lebanon
- Headquarters: Beirut (Lebanon)
- Agency executive: Hanine Sayyed, Minister of Social Affairs
- Website: Official website

The Ministry of Social Affairs (Arabic: وزارة الشؤون الإجتماعية) of Lebanon is part of the cabinet.

== History and functions ==
The ministry was created in 1993 by Law Number 212 and modified by Law Number 327 and Decree Number 5734. The major function of the ministry is to provide social protection and assistance.

The current minister of Social Affairs has been Hanine Sayyed since 8 February 2025.

== Structure ==
The Ministry of Social Affairs includes the following departments:

- Administrative Department (al-Diwan)
- Department of Planning and Research
- Department of Accounting
- Department of Development Services
- Department of Disabled persons
- Department of Social welfare
- Department of Private associations & Institutions
- Department of Family Social Services
- Department of Handcrafts
- Department of Social Development

== Former Ministers ==
- Rachid Derbass : 2014-2016
- Wael Abou Faour: 2011-2014
- Salim Sayegh: 2009-2011
- Mario Aoun: 2008-2009
- Nayla Moawad: 2005-2008
