= Lebanese aristocracy =

The Lebanese aristocracy (Arabic: الأرسطوقراطية اللبنانية), also known as manasib (Arabic: المناصب) literally "titles", is a social class that was formed during the Ottoman Lebanon period.

== History ==
The feudal aristocratic Lebanese families hold titles which were granted to them by the Ottoman authorities, or by the Emir of Mount Lebanon, or sometimes self-bestowed.

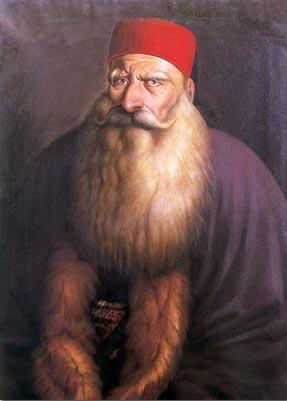
Bachir Chehab II, Emir of Mount Lebanon from 1789 to 1840.

Not all descendants of Lebanese aristocratic families were able to retain their honorific titles. The survival of these titles within certain branches of the old aristocratic families depended on their political connections, wealth & relative clout within their respective communities. Many families who were originally members of the feudal aristocracy have lost their social stature over time (to a lower rank, or were stripped from all titles). This phenomenon happened along political developments, such as during Ibrahim Pasha's rule of the Levant (1830-1840) which stripped the local feudal aristocracy of their tax rights, and subjected many of them to public humiliation as a form of political education for the public of the new reality and change of regime, a policy which continued, under the guise of the nominal equality of the Tanzimat Reforms, after the British restored the Turks as rulers of the region by the British pursuant to the Treaty of London thereby plunging many such families into complete poverty to the point where some had to live in hiding out of shame, as the American missionaries had reported at the time. Such stripping of tax rights was a decisive factor in the Civil War of 1860. Others have moved the opposite way, from lower titles of nobility to higher stature, normally with the Ottoman central government or its representatives bestowing upon them honorific titles for services rendered, or upon appointment to official post. Similarly, a number of ordinary Christians rose to high prominence and were able to accumulate significant wealth during the emancipatory era of Ibrahim Pasha in Mount Lebanon.

== Ottoman titles and ranks ==
Ottoman honorific titles were mostly based on their earlier usage in the military-administrative history. With time, these same titles started to be given to the civilian high-ranking officials. Many of these terms were Persian in origin. Unlike Arabic honorific titles, an Ottoman title comes directly after the first name (instead of preceding it).

=== List of titles ===
- Pasha
- Bey
- Agha
- Effendi
- Kaymakam
- Sheikh
- Emir
- Muqaddam
