= Georges Adwan =

Lebanese politician and lawyer

- جورج عدوان
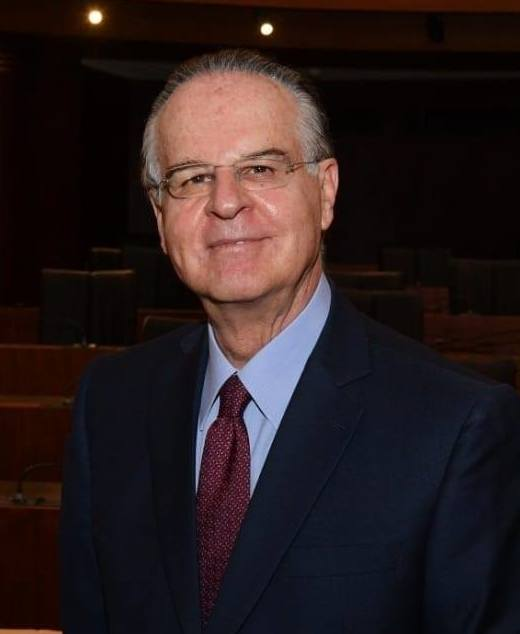

Member of the Lebanese Parliament
- Incumbent
- Assumed office 28 June 2005
- Constituency: Chouf District (from 28 June 2005)

Leader Of Al-Tanzim Resistance
- In office 1969–1990

Secretary General of the Lebanese Forces
- In office 1978–1989

Vice-Chairman of the Lebanese Forces
- Incumbent
- Assumed office 2005

Personal details
- Born: George Adwan; September 15, 1947 (age 78) Deir al-Qamar, Chouf District
- Party: Lebanese Forces
- Education: Law, Saint Joseph University, Beirut; Masters in International law, University of Strasbourg

Georges Adwan (Arabic: جورج عدوان; born 1947) is a lawyer and a Lebanese politician who holds the position of vice-president of the executive committee of the Lebanese Forces party since 2005.

== Early life ==
Adwan was born in Deir al-Qamar of the Chouf district on September 15, 1947.

He completed his secondary studies at the Marian Brothers School in Jounieh and has a bachelor's degree in Lebanese and French Law in the Institute of the Jesuit Fathers of Beirut.

== Career ==
=== Lebanese civil war and Al-Tanzim ===
Syria's military intervention in June 1976, and its tacit endorsement by Georges Adwan (who combined the MoC's presidency with that of secretary-general of the Lebanese Front at the time), however, caused the movement to factionalize, splitting into a pro-Syrian element headed by Adwan himself and a radical anti-Syrian majority gathered around Mahfouz and Zouein. An attempted coup orchestrated by Adwan, in which the latter tried to take over the Tanzim Dekwaneh's military HQ resulted in a deep rift within the organization. Both Mahfouz and Zouein, which opposed Adwan's position and behaviour, played a crucial role in preventing further internal bloodshed among the group member's (despite the fact that Adwan had murdered Tony Khater, a fellow Tanzim member) by regaining control of the movement, and ousting Adwan from the MoC/Tanzim leadership board in late that year.

=== Politics ===
He has been an MP in the Lebanese Parliament as a representative of one of the three Maronite seats in Chouf district since the 2005 legislative elections. Adwan was member of the Commanding Council of the Al-Tanzim Resistance during the Lebanese War. In 1989-1990, he was appointed as the official representative of the Lebanese Forces Resistance led by Samir Geagea during the discussions held with General Michel Aoun commanding the Lebanese army. He is also elected for the 2022 Parliamentary Elections in the Chouf.

== See also ==
- Al-Tanzim
- List of Lebanese Forces Deputies in the Lebanese Parliament
