= Fadi Sawan =

Lebanese military investigative judge (born 1960)

- Born: 1960 (age 65–66)
- Citizenship: Lebanese
- Education: Saint Joseph University
- Title: Judge

Fadi Sawan (Arabic: فادي صوّان, born in 1960) is a Lebanese military investigative judge, who became known after being assigned with the immense task of investigating the 2020 Beirut Port explosion, one of the largest non-nuclear blasts in history, the 2,750 tonnes of ammonium nitrate that killed more than 200 people, wounded over 6,000 and destroyed much of Beirut, the capital of Lebanon, on August 4, 2020.

In a country where political influence over the judiciary is a problem, which is part of corruption in Lebanon, he was known for his honesty and integrity and for not receiving instructions from politicians, thus many doubted that he could accomplish his task. As a result, in February 2021, he was removed from the probe, which will further delay the investigation. This in turn sparked a new wave of demonstrations, as part of the 2019–2021 Lebanese Revolution, with the participation of the families of the victims. The move was widely condemned, as being planned by the Lebanese authorities, who were under of extensive pressure to provide answers for the crime, which have not yet seen the light six months after the explosion.

== Biography ==
A Maronite Christian, born in 1960, he is a Saint Joseph University alumnus and has more than thirty years of experience in judiciary.

He became advocate general then investigative judge in Baabda, and since 2009 he has been the investigating judge at the military court, where he developed an expertise in terrorism cases, in which he delivered hundreds of verdicts against ISIS, Al-Nusra, and other takfiris and terrorist groups, in Lebanon. He is also known to be one of the few who issued indictments against the Islamist Ahmed Al-Assir and the other groups who fought the Lebanese Army.

The Supreme Judicial Council appointed him as the forensic investigator in the Beirut Port bombing that took place on August 4, 2020. However, In February 2021, the Lebanese court removed him from his of position, following legal challenges by Lebanese officials who he had previously accused of the "negligence" that led to the blast. The move, which is believed to be planned on purpose, will further delay the investigation that had already faced violent political opposition. He also faced criticism from the Shiite Hezbollah and the Sunni former Prime Minister Saad Hariri. He was removed from the case on February 18, 2021, after the request from 2 ex-ministers Ghazi Zeaiter and Ali Hassan Khalil, both lawmakers for the speaker Nabih Berri's Amal Movement, the ally of Hezbollah, the two he had already charged in the case, a move condemned by the Human Rights Watch.

== See also ==
- Ghada Aoun
