= Antoine Karam (Lebanese politician) =

Lebanese politician and physician (born 1956)

Minister of Environment
- In office 11 July 2008 – 9 November 2009
- Prime Minister: Fouad Siniora
- Succeeded by: Mohammad Naji Rahhal

Personal details
- Born: 1956 (age 69–70) Hadath, Lebanon
- Party: Lebanese Forces
- Spouse: Danielle Mattar
- Children: 2
- Education: St. Joseph University

Antoine Karam (Arabic: أنطوان كرم; born 1956) is a Maronite Lebanese politician who served as the minister of environment.

== Early life and education ==
Karam was born in Hadath in 1956. He holds a medicine degree, which he received from the University of St. Joseph in 1985.

== Career ==
Karam is a member of the Lebanese Forces, led by Samir Geagea, since its inception. He is a member of party's executive committee.

Karam was appointed minister of environment to the cabinet led by Prime Minister Fouad Siniora on 11 July 2008. He was part of the 14 March alliance in the cabinet. His tenure ended in November 2009, and he was replaced by Mohammad Naji Rahhal in the post.

== Personal life ==
Karam is married to Danielle Mattar and has two children.
