= Ghassan Hasbani =

Lebanese businessman and politician (born 1972)

- غسان حاصباني
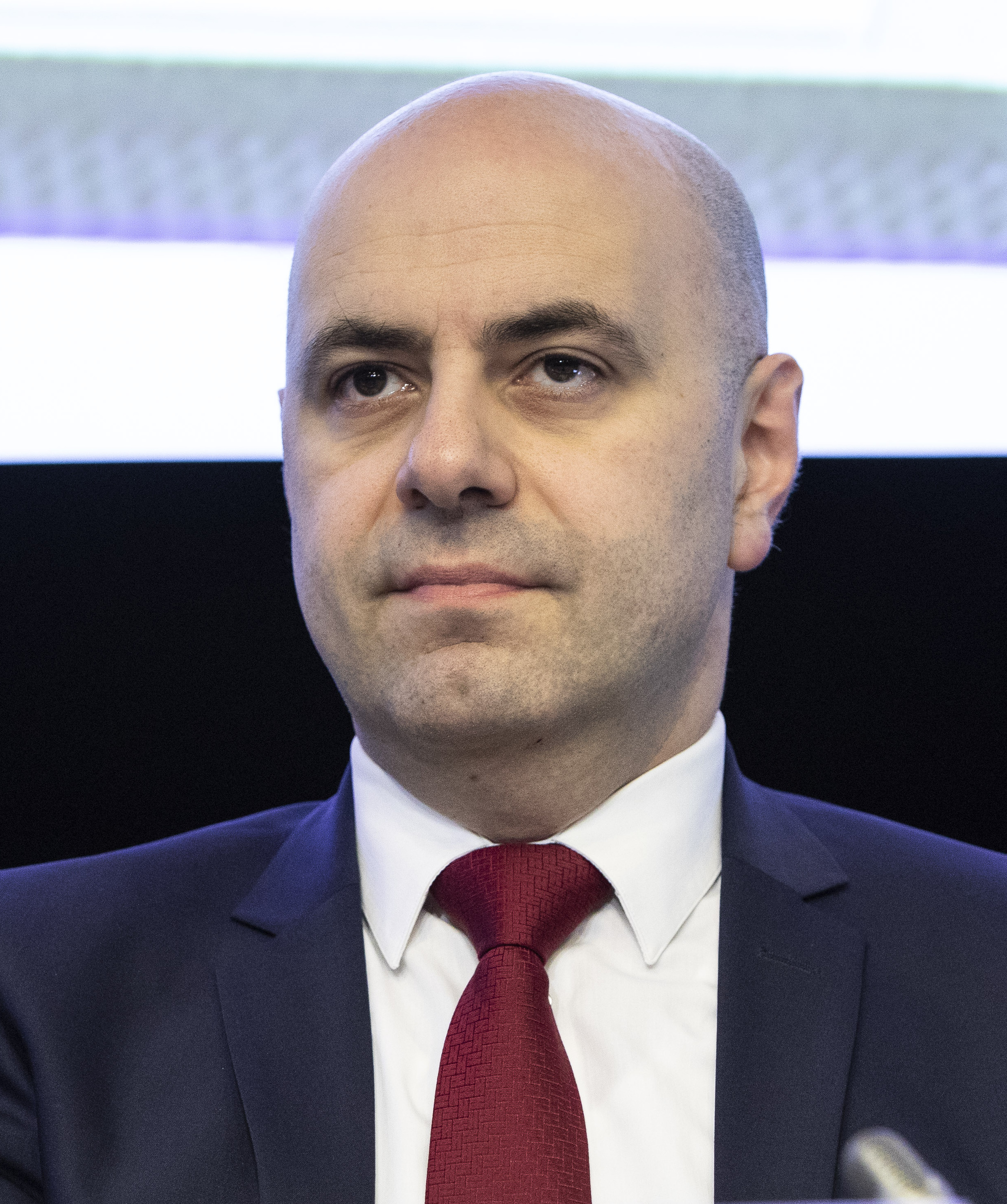
- Ghassan Hasbani in 2018

Member of the Lebanese Parliament
- Incumbent
- Assumed office 21 May 2022
- Constituency: Beirut I (2022)

Deputy Prime Minister of Lebanon
- In office 18 December 2016 – 21 January 2020
- Prime Minister: Saad Hariri
- Preceded by: Samir Mouqbel
- Succeeded by: Zeina Akar

Minister of Public Health
- In office 18 December 2016 – 31 January 2019
- Prime Minister: Saad Hariri
- Preceded by: Wael Abou Faour
- Succeeded by: Jamil Jabbak

CEO of STC International
- In office 2010–2012

Personal details
- Born: Ghassan Hasbani; 30 August 1972 (age 53) Beirut, Lebanon
- Party: Lebanese Forces
- Cabinet: Lebanese government of December 2016

Ghassan Hasbani (Arabic: غسان حاصباني; born 30 August 1972) is a Lebanese businessman and member of the Strong Republic bloc in the Lebanese Parliament. He has been Lebanon's minister of public health and (simultaneously) deputy prime minister from December 2016 to January 2020. Ghassan is an administrator and expert at the international level in planning, economics and technology.

== Early life and education ==
Ghassan Hasbani was born in Rmeil, Beirut to a Greek Orthodox Christian family in 1972. He completed his graduate studies in London and obtained a degree with distinction in engineering and a Master of Business Administration (MBA).

== Career ==
=== CEO of STC International (2010–2012) ===
He joined the Saudi Telecom Company (STC) from the global management consulting firm Booz & Company, where he led the firm's Middle East Communications and Technology practice and had been with the firm for 10 years.

=== Politics ===
After the resignation of Tammam Salam, Aoun designated Saad Hariri to form a new cabinet following binding parliamentary consultations. This came as a result of the consensus that led to the election of Aoun, and it was the second time Hariri held the position. The cabinet consisted of 30 ministers as a national unity government. On 28 December, it won the confidence of the parliament with an 87 MPs majority. Hasbani was named Deputy Prime Minister of Lebanon and Minister of Public Health.

In the 2022 Lebanese general election, the Lebanese Forces party saw expected gains by fielding its prominent member, Ghassan Hasbani, who received 16% of the district votes alone with 7,080 votes. The list was expected to win three seats but lost the Minorities seat to the Liwatani list, despite having more votes, in which an appeal was made to the constitution court to contest the loss.

== Personal life ==
Hasbani is a Greek Orthodox Christian. He is married to Nadine Hasbani and together have three children.

== Awards ==
- Outstanding CEO Award (2012)
