= Tarek Bitar =

Lebanese judge (born 1974)

- طارق بيطار
- Born: 1974 (age 51–52); Aydamun, Akkar, Lebanon
- Education: Lebanese University (1999)
- Occupation: Judge
- Years active: 1999 (as attorney)–present (as judge)
- Known for: Second investigative judge appointed to lead the probe into the 2020 Beirut Port explosion.
- Children: 2

Tarek Bitar (Arabic: طارق بيطار, Akkar, born 1974) is a Lebanese judge and the head of Beirut's criminal court, who is the second judge to lead the investigation of the 2020 Beirut Port explosion, succeeding Fadi Sawwan who was dismissed by the Lebanese court after charging two former Amal Party ministers over the blast, which was caused by 2,750 tonnes of ammonium nitrate negligently stored in the port for over six years. Sawwan's dismissal was objected to by the victims’ families because they feared that it would take the case back to zero. In September 2021, Bitar received a threat by Hezbollah.

Bitar is described as having no bias or affiliations to any political party.

On 14 October 2021, protests were instigated by the Shiite groups of Hezbollah and the Amal Movement, rebuffed by the Lebanese Army, outside the Justice Palace in Eastern Beirut, demanding an end to Bitar's judgeship, accusing him of political bias and incompetence. Clashes erupted between the militants leaving six protesters and one civilian dead. In December 2022 the investigation was suspended and in January 2023 all suspects were released in an illegal manner by Ghassan Oueidat Lebanon's top prosecutor. In May 2025 it was reported that he will issue indictment in the 2020 Beirut port explosion case, on August 4. This will be the fifth anniversary of the disaster.

== Biography ==
Born in the village of Aydamun in Akkar, he is married and the father of two children.

He earned his law degree from the Lebanese University in 1999, and began his career as an attorney until he became the sole criminal judge of North Lebanon until 2010.

Since 2017 he has been the head of the Criminal Court in Beirut.

In August 2020, at the time of the explosion, his name was put forward by the minister Marie-Claude Najm to lead the investigation ahead of Fadi Sawwan, which he refused due to some unknown reasons, possibly due to political pressure.

However, in February 2021, he was finally appointed as new investigator in the Beirut blast probe, after the removal of Sawwan who was dismissed by the Lebanese court when the two ministers he charged with negligence requested that the case be transferred to another judge. The reasons for his acceptance this time remain unclear. On January 16, 2025, he announced the resume of the resume of the Beirut Port explosion investigation and on the same day he pressed charges against ten new individuals including security officials from customs, the Lebanese army, and the Lebanese General Security, as well as employees at the Port of Beirut.

== See also ==
- 2020 Beirut explosion
- 2021 Beirut clashes
