= Eddy Abillammaa =

Lebanese politician

Emir Eddy Abillama (Arabic: الأمير إدي أبي اللمع, born in 1958) is a Lebanese politician and a member of the executive committee of the Lebanese Forces party. He is the head of the LF party in the Matn district.

== Personal life and education ==
Abillama was born to a Maronite Catholic family in Jdeideh, Matn. He attended Saint Joseph University in Beirut and earned a bachelor's degree in Business Administration and a master's degree in Business Computing. He has also obtained a Post Graduate Research Degree from the Université Saint-Esprit de Kaslik. He is married to Rana Ghorayeb.

== Political career ==
In 1981, Abillammaa helped in launching the Lebanese Broadcasting Corporation and joined the LF in 1982. In that same year, he joined the LF headquarters in Karantina then he became the head of the International Media Relations department in 1984. He was appointed as head of the LF party in Beirut in 2000 and was a member of Qornet Shehwan Gathering between 2001 and 2005.

== See also ==
- Lebanese Forces
