= Imad Wakim =

Lebanese politician

- عماد واكيم

Member of Parliament

Personal details
- Political party: Lebanese Forces

Imad Wakim (Arabic: عماد واكيم) is a Lebanese politician who served as member of parliament since 2018. He is a member of the Lebanese Forces and its parliamentary bloc, the Strong Republic. Wakim is a Greek Orthodox Christian.
