= Rachid Derbass =

Lebabese politician

Rachid Derbass (Arabic: رشيد درباس) is a former Lebanese government minister from El Mina, Lebanon. He served as minister of social affairs from 2014 to 2016 under Prime Minister Tamam Salam.

== Early life and career ==
Rashid Derbass was born in the northern city of El Mina in Lebanon in 1941, to Toufic Derbass and Habiba Abdul Wahab. He earned his Lebanese Baccalaureate in 1961, and a law degree from the University of Cairo in 1966. He earned an LLM from the Lebanese University in 1967, and began practicing law in Tripoli, Lebanon.

== Political career ==
Derbass first ran for parliament in 1992 in the first elections in after the Lebanese Civil War. Unsuccessful in his bid for parliament, Derbass remained active in the North Lebanon political scene, and was elected as the head of the North Lebanon Bar association in 1998 and served as president until 2000. Derbass was appointed as Minister of Social Affairs in 2014, under the government of Tamam Salam and served until 2016. Derbass' tenure witnessed a surge in Syrian refugees escaping the Assad Regime, and introduced the first refugee affairs policy in October 2014 by the Lebanese Cabinet, the Lebanese Crisis Response Plan, jointly with the United Nations High Commission for Refuggees (UNHCR).
