= Right-wing nationalism =

Right-wing nationalism may refer to:

- National conservatism
- Neo-nationalism
- Right-wing populism
