= Television in Lebanon =

Television in Lebanon arose as a private initiative and not a state-institution. Lebanon was the first country in the Middle East & the Arab world to have indigenous television broadcasting. Various Arab televisions emulated the Lebanese model.

There are two significant television platforms in Lebanon: analogue terrestrial (14% of households) and free satellite (83% of households). There is also a relatively high penetration of cable television, but because of the high prevalence of cable theft the official penetration rate is low, at less than 5%. More than 90% of Lebanese households have access to satellite television.

There are 22 free-to-air satellite channels headquartered in Lebanon. There is one government-owned television channel, Tele Liban, which was established in 1959. Several TV channels are politically affiliated, and political parties are an important source of funding. Lebanese Broadcasting Corporation International (LBCI) was launched in 1985, was the first private network in Lebanon. Some other Lebanese channels include MTV Lebanon, Future TV, Al Manar TV, NBN, Al Jadeed TV, and Orange TV.

Domestic channels, in particular LBCI, have historically been the most popular, as opposed to most other Arab countries where pan-Arab channels dominate. Despite that, large pan-Arab broadcasters, and in particular MBC channels, have proven popular with satellite viewers.

== History ==
=== 1950s–1980s ===
While television in the Arab world was a government monopoly, Lebanon was an exception. In 1956, the Lebanese government granted broadcast licenses to two private companies, La Compagnie Libanaise de Télévision (CLT) and Compagnie de Télévision du Liban et du Proche-Orient (Télé-Orient). CLT began broadcasting on 28 May 1959, making it the first commercial television station in the Arabic-speaking world. Soon after Télé-Orient, with financing from the American Broadcasting Company, began broadcasting. CLT, which was licensed to Alex Aridi and Wissam Izzedine, operated two VHF channels, Canal 7 and Canal 9. Canal 9 was a French-language channel. After the Egyptian Revolution of 1952, media production migrated from Cairo to Beirut; that helped fuel television production in Lebanon.

In 1967, CLT became the third television station in the world after the Soviet Union and France to broadcast in color, utilizing the French SECAM technology. Export of taped programming to other Arab countries continued and was profitable during this decade. Both CLT and Tele Orient sold locally produced programs to television institutions in the Arab world. Beirut was the one challenger to Cairo as a major source of pan-Arab television, especially among countries wary of Egyptian propaganda. Lebanese programs—designed to avoid causing offense in conservative cultures—were especially popular in Saudi Arabia, which refused to buy from Egypt. Lebanese signal overspill reached Syria, Jordan, and Israel.

During the war, rival factions utilized broadcast media for their own purposes. In 1976, Brigadier general Abdel Aziz al‐Ahdab staged a coup, demanding the resignation of then-President Suleiman Frangieh. al‐Ahdab announced the coup on television after his forces overtook CLT, a private television company. In retaliation, supporters of President Frangieh took control of Télé-Orient, and this split continued until the election of President Élias Sarkis. Due to the political strife, both CLT and Télé-Orient were facing financial difficulties so in 1977, both stations came to an agreement with the Lebanese government to merge into one national television station, which was named Télé-Liban.

Despite the war, Lebanese telenovelas continued to be produced and were shown across the Arab world. One of the most popular television shows of this period was Studio El Fan, a singing competition show.

Additionally, media entrepreneurs in Lebanon, sometimes financed by Kuwaitis, began importing and dubbing foreign productions into Arabic. Nicholas Abu Samah, owner of Filmali, was a pioneer of video dubbing into Arabic. Filmali dubbed a series of anime, such as Arabian Nights: Sinbad's Adventures, Maya the Honey Bee, and Grendizer that were exported to national televisions across the Arab world.

Télé Liban broadcast a large number of American programs, miniseries and films in the early eighties, such as Dallas, Dynasty, Fame, Falcon Crest, Flamingo Road, The Love Boat, Happy Days, Solid Gold, and Roots. Télé Liban would remain the only TV station in Lebanon until 1985 when the Lebanese Broadcasting Corporation, began broadcasting programs, albeit without a license and thus illegally. LBCI ended Télé Liban's monopoly and quickly became Lebanon's most watched channel due to its advanced technology, innovative programming and coverage of the news.

Television production companies continued to dub anime series, such as Hello! Sandybell and Belle and Sebastian, and to export them to Arab televisions.

=== 1990s ===
After the war, Lebanon emerged as the country with the most liberal media in the region. In the early nineties, there were 54 television stations operating in the country. In 1994, Lebanon once again legalized private ownerships of radio and television stations, making it the only country in the Arab world to do so at the time. The Audiovisual Media Law of 1994 not only regulated the airwaves, but also ended the state's monopoly over broadcast television that had been in effect since 1977. Two years later, the government passed a similar law addressing satellite television stations. In 1996, the Lebanese Broadcasting Corporation (LBCI) became the first Arab satellite station to broadcast from the Arab world. MBC was then broadcasting from London and ART from Italy.

Soon after, privately owned Future Television also began broadcasting from Beirut to the Arab world and along with LBC changed viewing patterns across Arab countries, and especially in Arab states of the Persian Gulf. Lebanon offered Gulf viewers a view into a much more open-minded and liberal, Arabic-speaking society—with different dress-codes and values—that was distant enough geographically not to be threatening to their own values. With Lebanon's private satellite television stations broadcasting unique and innovative programming out of Lebanon, the country gained regional influence disproportionate to its small population and geographic size. The Pan-Arab reach that Lebanese television quickly achieved challenged the dominance of Egyptian television and Saudi-owned satellite stations, such as MBC and ART. While attractive female presenters and entertaining games shows helped garner viewership for Lebanese television across the Arab world, the influence was much greater as Arab terrestrial and satellite stations, including Al Jazeera, "unmistakably adopted the styles and methods of the Lebanese School of Journalism, in language, content presentation and delivery of news and current affairs programs as well as entertainment shows". LBC's programming were innovative and pushed the envelope on several social and cultural fronts, and this made the channel very popular across the Arab world. For example, LBC was as popular in Saudi Arabia in 1997 as was Saudi-owned MBC.

In the early 1990s, audiences across the Arab world were exposed to dubbed, Latin American television productions for the first time. Nicolas Abu Samah's Filmali dubbed Mexican and Brazilian telenovelas into Arabic to air on Lebanese stations, especially LBC. These dubbed telenovelas were also sold to other Arab television stations.

In 1996, Scorpions became the first, international rock band to perform in Lebanon after the war, and during their stay in Beirut, they filmed their music video for the song, “When You Came into My Life” in the hotel district of Beirut Central District, which was yet to be redeveloped.

=== 21st century ===
The remarkable amount of media production for terrestrial and satellite television, music videos and advertising commercials created a large and viable media industry and maintained Lebanon as one of the important media centers in the region. Beirut remained a major production and broadcast center in the region with companies like MBC, which was based in Dubai, continuing to transmit and produce programming from Beirut. Dubai Media Incorporated also continued to broadcast some of its programs, like Taratata, from Lebanon while Abu Dhabi Media had several programs produced in Beirut as well.

Television stations in Lebanon, such as LBCI and Future Television, pioneered reality TV in the Arab world, especially music competition shows. In 2003, Future Television began broadcasting Superstar, which was based on the popular British show, Pop Idol, created by Simon Fuller's 19 Entertainment & developed by Fremantle Media. In the same year, LBC began producing the Arab version of Endemol's Star Academy. Both shows were extremely popular with audiences across the Arab world. These shows, especially Star Academy, broke social taboos, such as non-sexual cohabitation.

In 2002, Murr Television was forced to shut down officially due to a technical violation of the law but in reality due to its anti-Syrian stance and continuous criticism of the government and Syrian interference in Lebanese affairs. Four years after the withdrawal of Syrian troops from Lebanon, Murr Television (MTV) re-opened in 2009.

== Television stations and networks ==
Name	Ownership
Télé Liban	Government-owned
Lebanese Broadcasting Corporation International	Privately held
Télé Lumière	Privately held
Murr Television (MTV)	Privately held
Orange TV (OTV)	Privately held
Future Television	Privately held
Al Jadeed	Privately held
National Broadcasting Network	Privately held
Al-Manar	Privately held
LB2 (LBCI sister channel)	Privately held
One TV (Murr TV sister channel)	Privately held
Aghani Aghani	Privately held
Red TV	Privately held

Other local channels include Senses TV (music and aerial videos), Noursat Al Sharq (Noursat sister channel), Charity TV (religious), Sawt al Ghad TV (music videos), Red TV (local news platform), VDL24 (local news platform), SHFT TV (online/TV hybrid platform).

== Most viewed channels ==
No official data is currently available. LBCI, Al Jadeed, and MTV are among the top watched channels.

== See also ==
- List of Lebanese television series
- Cinema of Lebanon
