= Charlotte Wazen =

Lebanese television personality

Charlotte Wazen El Khoury
- شارلوت وازن الخوري
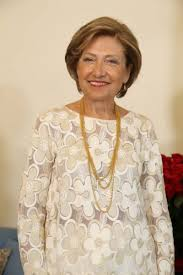
- Born: June 23, 1942; Beirut, Lebanon
- Occupation(s): Journalist, TV personality, TV host
- Years active: 1962–1990
- Spouse: Ibrahim El Khoury (m. 1963–2013)
- Children: Christine El Khoury, Câline El Khoury
- Parent(s): Elias Wazen, Juliette Wazen

Charlotte Wazen El Khoury (Arabic: شارلوت وازن الخوري; born June 23, 1942) is a Lebanese former television personality and presenter. She worked from 1963 to 1990 on various TV shows and radio stations.

== Beginnings ==
Born in a large family, Wazen is the third of six children. At school, she was often praised for her ease in public speaking and presentation.

She started working at Compagnie libanaise de Télévision (CLT) when she was 18, presenting TV adverts. A neighbor who worked in TV production encouraged her to apply for a job on TV. Though her father, an army officer, did not like the idea, he agreed to accompany her to the interview. As soon as he entered the studio, he said to a neighbor who was there, "Make her fail". Instead, Jean-Claude Boulos, who was responsible for the program at the time, exclaimed when he saw her on the monitor: "Not bad at all, the little one!"

== Career ==
=== Rise ===
In 1971, the Lebanese media industry had only two distinct TV channels, CLT (formerly Tele Liban) and Tele Orient (which later merged to form Tele Liban.) At the time, Wazen was working for CLT, presenting a small program for the Majallati—a weekly show presenting contests between students testing their knowledge. She was offered a position at Tele Orient as a co-host for a popular show, co-hosted by Najib Hankach.

Later in her career with Tele Orient, she was chosen for a six-month program in Glasgow, Scotland sponsored by the Thompson Foundation, dedicated to training journalists in developing countries. Wazen trained in production, directing, and specialized in the production of shows directed for women and children, which allowed her to present such shows later when she returned from Scotland.

=== During the Civil War ===
The Lebanese Civil War marked a big change with the new president (Elias Sarkis) and a change in Lebanese media organization. In 1976, at the start of the war, Wazen stopped presenting her usual shows and started playing a role in sharing information, through the information department.

=== Radio broadcasting ===
As well as a TV host, Wazen was a radio host at Radio Liban, where she presented various programs.

During the 1990s, Wazen moved to Paris, France, where she was responsible for the Lebanese news department at Radio Orient.

=== Various events and recognitions ===
Though known for her reserved demeanor, refusing invitations to interviews and events, Wazen has received considerable recognition over the years. One event she participated in was the 1997 Miss Lebanon contest, where she served as a judge along with other celebrities. Wazen was elected the prettiest and most favorite personality of the Lebanese people, in a poll by مشوار of the magazine's readers. Wazen el Khoury won first place to be the ambassador of beauty and professionalism, "elected for the people by the people" as magazine director Sami Maksad put it.

In 1982 she was again elected the most popular female television presenter on Lebanese television, this time by readers of the magazine Le Réveil.

== Personal life ==
Charlotte Wazen El-Khoury was married to Ibrahim El Khoury (1936–2013), the former president of Tele Liban, from 1999 until his death in 2013. They have two daughters, Christine and Câline El-Khoury.
