= Ibrahim Assaf =

Lebanese diplomat (born 1968)

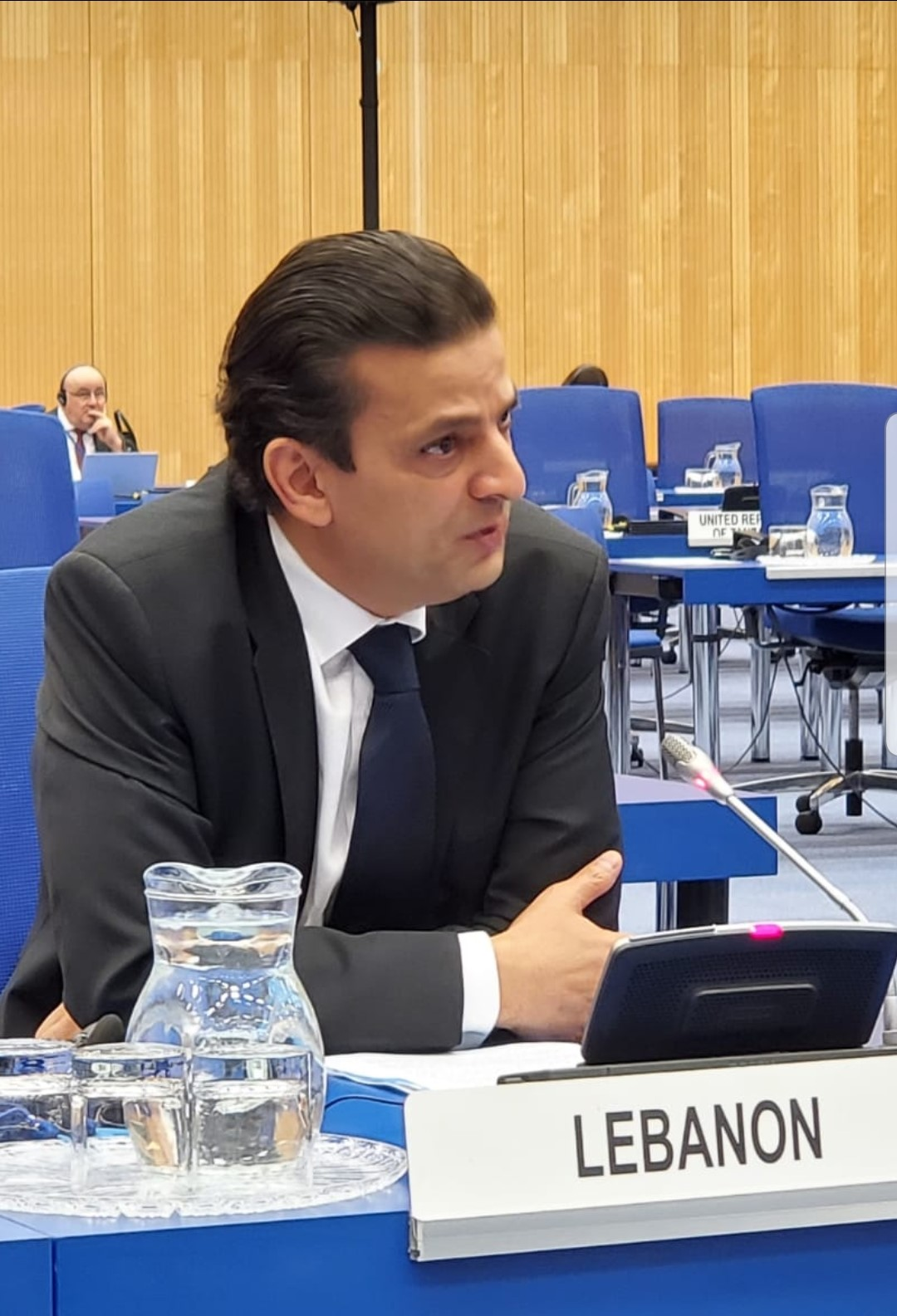
- Ibrahim Assaf
- Born: 1968 (age 57–58); Lebanon
- Education: Bachelor’s Degree in Philosophy
- Occupation: Diplomat
- Known for: Ambassador to Austria
- Spouse: Brigitte Tawk
- Children: 3

Ibrahim Assaf is a Lebanese diplomat.

he is the Ambassador of Lebanon to the Republic of Austria since November 2017., and is also accredited as the non-resident Ambassador of Lebanon to the Republic of Slovakia, the Republic of Slovenia and the Republic of Croatia. Ambassador Assaf is also the Permanent Representative of Lebanon to the United Nations Office and other International Organizations in Vienna.

== Early career ==
Previously he was the Chargé d'Affaires of Lebanon in the Kingdom of Bahrain between 2012 and 2017. And prior to that, he worked at the Permanent Mission of Lebanon to the United Nations in New York, and he was Deputy Permanent Representative of Lebanon, and subsequently the Chargé d'Affaires of the Permanent Mission from 2004 to 2006.

== Education and personal profile ==
Born in Lebanon in 1968, Ibrahim Assaf holds a bachelor's degree in philosophy from the Holy Spirit University of Kaslik (USEK), Lebanon. He is also a graduate from the Lebanese National Institute of Administration in 1993. He is married to Mrs. Brigitte Tawk and they have 3 children.

== Publications ==
In 2009, he published a Book entitled “The Last Assassination”, regarding the United Nations Documents on the Investigation concerning the assassination of former Prime Minister of Lebanon Rafic Hariri.
