= VDL =

VDL may refer to:

- VDL Groep, Dutch manufacturing company
- VDL Nedcar, automotive manufacturing company in Born, Netherlands
- VDL Bus & Coach, Dutch vehicle manufacturer
- Van Diemen's Land, former name of the Australian state of Tasmania
- Van Diemen's Land Company in Tasmania
- Vienna Definition Language in computer programming
- Voix du Liban, or Voice of Lebanon, a name used by two radio stations in Lebanon
- VHF Data Link
- Neutra VDL Studio and Residences
- Ursula von der Leyen, President of the European Commission
