= Achkar =

Achkar is both a given name and a surname. Notable people with the name include:

== Given name ==
- Achkar Marof (1930–1971), Guinean diplomat
- Alok Achkar (born 1991), Brazilian Dj

== Surname ==
- Ad Achkar (born 1988), Lebanese photographer
- Ghassan Achkar (born 1937), Lebanese politician
- Massoud Achkar, Lebanese politician
- Paul Achkar (1893–1982), Lebanese Archbishop
