= Télé Liban =

Lebanese public television channel

Télé Liban تلفزيون لبنان
- Type: Terrestrial & Satellite Television Network/Broadcaster
- Country: Lebanon
- Broadcast area: Lebanon; MENA and International (via internet)
- Headquarters: Beirut, Lebanon

Programming
- Language: Arabic (with a daily news bulletin produced in French)
- Picture format: 576i SDTV 4:3

Ownership
- Owner: Lebanese Government
- Key people: Elissar Naddaf (President & Director-General)

History
- Founded: August 1956
- Launched: 28 May 1959; 67 years ago
- Founder: Wissam Izzeddine, Alex Moufarrej
- Replaced: Compagnie Libanaise de Télévision (CLT) (channels 7 and 9) and Télé-Orient (channels 5 and 11)

Télé Liban (also known as TL, Arabic: تلفزيون لبنان) is the first Lebanese public television network, owned by the Lebanese government. It was a result of a merger of the privately run Compagnie Libanaise de Télévision (CLT) (channels 7 and 9) and Télé-Orient (channels 5 and 11). TL is the current Lebanese member of the European Broadcasting Union (EBU), and the Arab States Broadcasting Union (ASBU).

== History ==
=== Compagnie Libanaise de Télévision ===
The Lebanese government granted businessmen Wissam Izzeddine and Alex Moufarrej the first local television license in August 1956, and private Compagnie Libanaise de Télévision (CLT) (in Arabic, شركة التلفزيون اللبنانية). CLT aired programs for the first time on 28 May 1959, making it the first TV station not only in Lebanon but also in the region. The station was officially launched by General Sleiman Nawfal with the aid of France. Color broadcasts started on 21 October 1967, using the French SECAM system, to a total of ten television sets. CLT was backed by Sofirad, who in turn was related to the developers of the system.

The French and English service was carried on channel 9, while the Arabic service was carried on channel 7. In Tripoli, the former service was relayed on channel 4, the latter on channel 2. A composite service was carried in Masser Chouf on channel 4. By the early 1970s, its French channel was airing seven hours of ORTF programming per week free of charge.

=== Télé-Orient ===
The station remained Lebanon's only television station until Télé-Orient, full name Television of Lebanon and the Orient (in Arabic تلفزيون لبنان والمشرق), obtained its own license in July 1961 and began operating from Hazmieh. The station carried its services on channel 11 and was partly financed by Thomson Television International.

=== 1960s and 1970s ===
Throughout the 1960s and into the 1970s, Télé Liban provided local, original programming as well as imports from France and the United States. What made Télé Liban unique in the region was its creation of innovative content for a pluralistic country like Lebanon.

=== Civil War period ===
During the Lebanese Civil War, the two private television stations had been taken over by militias, CLT-based channels 7 and 9 located in West Beirut had been dominated by the Muslim militias and Télé-Orient station channels 5 and 11 located in Hazmieh in the Christian suburbs of East Beirut by Christian militias. Both stations fell into presenting biased coverage according to the parties dominating them.

Two unlicenced pirate stations, the Christian "Lebanese Broadcasting Corporation" (LBC) and the Muslim "Television of Arab Lebanon" (تلفزيون لبنان العربي) run by the Mourabitoun Muslim Sunni militia were launched, challenging the existing stations.

The newly elected president, Elias Sarkis wanted a unified media outlet to promote his agenda of peace and unity. The two privately owned stations, CLT and Télé Orient, and their subsidiaries agreed to merge in a deal where half the shares were owned by the Lebanese government. The Legislative Decree No. 100 was published in the National Gazette (in Arabic الجريدة الرسمية) on 7 July 1977, making the merger official

The private CLT and Télé-Orient rival stations would later be completely acquired by the Lebanese government and the merged company became a public television station and name changed to Télé Liban.

=== Post-War period ===
When the civil war ended, Télé Liban's monopoly was removed under the 1994 Audiovisual Media Law, and the station found itself for the first time facing tremendous competition. Other television stations with more innovative programming, such as the Lebanese Broadcasting Corporation International, overtook Télé Liban's audience in the 1990s.

Rafic Hariri bought the private sector shares of Télé Liban months before he became prime minister in 1992 and appointed Fouad Naïm as chairman, who quickly revamped the station. However, the government bought back all the shares from the private sector in 1994.

The plethora of private terrestrial and satellite stations available in the Lebanese television market came at the expense of Télé Liban, which since the late 1990s been in continuous decline.

== Administration ==
Initially, Télé Liban was managed by a board composed of twelve directors, six representing the government and six representing TLC and Télé Orient.

The chair of the channel is appointed by the Lebanese cabinet. Jean Claude Boulos and Ibrahim El Khoury, who was chairman from 1999 to 2013, were former presidents of the channel during the 1990s. Talal Makdessi served as interim president from 2014 to 2017 while the government was in the process of appointing a new Board of Directors, until he was dismissed by a judicial decision on 26 May 2017. Vice President Wafaa Mahfouz then managed the channel.

During its session on Friday, 11 July 2025, the Lebanese Cabinet, presided over by President of Lebanon Joseph Aoun, appointed Dr. Elissar Naddaf Geagea as Chairwoman of the Board of Directors and Director-General of Télé Liban. Dr. Naddaf is the 11th person to lead the public channel since the merger of the two antennas in 1978, and the first woman in Lebanese broadcasting history to hold this position. The cabinet also appointed board members Janan Wajdi Mallat, Mohammed Nimr, Charles Rizkallah Saba, Ali Ibrahim Qassem, and Rima Hani Khaddad. This appointment came after years of administrative vacuum and is seen as a step toward reviving the once-iconic institution, which served as a cultural and historical mirror for Lebanon. According to government sources, the Cabinet reached a consensus on the nominees, and the nominations were approved without objection. The appointment process was praised for its transparency and for favoring competence over corruption, interference, and quotas.

== See also ==
- Lebanese Broadcasting Corporation International
- MTV
- OTV
- NBN
- Radio Lebanon
