= Télé Lumière =

Lebanese Catholic television station

Télé Lumière is the first Christian television station in Lebanon and the Arab world and was founded in 1991. Since 2003, it also broadcasts satellite programming worldwide under the name Noursat. It is operated by the Catholic bishops conference of Lebanon.

== History ==
Télé Lumière logo

Télé Lumière meaning the "Television of Light" was founded in 1991 by a group of lay people: Late Charles Helou, a former President of Lebanon, Brother Nour, Jack Kallassi, Late George Frem (ex. MP and minister), George Moawad, Rola and Sana Nassar, Dr. Antoine Saad and Christiane Debbaneh.

Télé Lumière is a non-profit organization, its mission is ecumenical, it is not associated to any political party or movement, do not broadcast any political views and do not accept or promote any commercial endorsements. As a non profit broadcasting station, it survives only from donations given by its supporters and friends.

The Church cooperated with this television station since the beginning. Télé Lumière is supervised by the Assembly of Catholic Patriarchs and Bishops in Lebanon and directed by a committee involving religious leaders from various denominations and a group of laity. The relationship between the Church and Télé Lumière is organized through a "cooperation protocol".

As for the government, it considers Télé Lumière a Christian station, financially independent and having freedom of management and programming controlled only by the authority of the Church.

== Noursat ==
Noursat logo

In June 2003, on Pentecost, Télé Lumière celebrated its 12th anniversary as well as the launching of its satellite station Noursat covering United Kingdom, European Union, Southwest Asia, and North Africa. Actually (2020) the station is located at the A05 transponder of Eutelsat 7West-A at 7,3°W. One year later, at 8 September 2004, Noursat began its official broadcast in North and South America, United States, Canada, and Australia (platforms MySat, MySatGo).

== Board of directors ==
- Archbishop Roland Abou Jaoudé (President)
- Jack Kallassi (General Manager)
- Brother Nour (General Supervisor)
- Rola Nassar (Financial Manager)
- Dr. Antoine Saad (General Secretary)
- Father Khalil Alwan (member)
- Neemat Frem (member)
- George Moawad (member)
- Sana Nassar (member)
- Raymond Nader (Noursat Executive Director)

== See also ==
- Catholic television
- Catholic television channels
- Catholic television networks
- Television in Lebanon
