= Ibrahim El Khoury =

Lebanese director and producer

Ibrahim E. El Khoury
- ابراهيم أ. الخوري
- Born: July 20, 1936; Bekaa, Lebanon
- Died: July 28, 2013 (aged 77); Bhannes, Lebanon
- Occupation(s): Director, producer, ex-chairman of Tele Liban, co-founder, and ex-chairman of Voice of Lebanon radio, university professor
- Years active: 1959–2013
- Predecessor: Jean Claude Boulos
- Successor: Talal Makdessi (temporary)- dismissed in 2017
- Spouse: Charlotte Wazen (m. 1963–2013)
- Children: 2
- Parent(s): Elias El Khoury, Marie El Khoury

Ibrahim E. El Khoury (Arabic: ابراهيم أ. الخوري; July 20, 1936 – July 28, 2013) was a Lebanese director and producer who was chairman of the Télé Liban television network from 1999 until his death.

== Early life ==
He started at CLT (Compagnie libanaise de Télévision ex-Tele Liban) in 1959 with the rise of the Lebanese television as a studio supervisor at the Lebanese national TV, he was at the same time producer and presenter of a variety show on the same channel.

== Career ==
Selected productions:

El Khoury directed the Arabic version of the Hunchback of Notre Dame by Victor Hugo"الاخرس" (number of episodes:13) along with the TV series "عليا وعصام" (number of episodes:13) which he also produced. Another big French novel that he has re-adapted to the Lebanese and Arab-speaking screens, is the French novel Colomba by Prosper Mérimée which he turned into a Lebanese TV series "كولومبا" (number of episodes:7).

El Khoury has also directed and produced "حنين في الليل" a Lebanese TV series that won two awards for Best Director and Best Acting. (Haneen in the night).

He has also directed a very big majority of the episodes of the famous Lebanese TV series "ابو ملحم". (Abou Melhem) which, for many, is the best Lebanese production to ever be on the screen; But that was not his only contribution to the Lebanese blockbusters, he directed many episodes of the TV series "ابو سليم". (Abou Saleem).

Along with the TV series El-Khoury directed and produced, he has also worked on many TV shows like the famous Lebanese TV show "سهره مع الماضي" presented by the prestigious Leila Rustom. (Evening with the past) and the TV show "بيروت في الليل". (Beirut at night).

All the previous TV series and shows have produced and appeared on Télé Liban one of the only Lebanese TV channel at the time.

=== Professional occupations ===
Other than his work at Télé Liban as a Producer and Director between 1959 and 1980, El-Khoury also worked in the following sectors:

- 1976-1984: El Khoury was a program supervisor at the Voice of Lebanon.
- 1984-1989: He became the CEO of the Lebanese national radio.
- 1994-1999: El Khoury was an advisor at the Ministry of Information for subject related to audiovisual.
- 1999-2013: El Khoury was nominated as the new CEO and chairman of the Lebanese national TV channel, Télé Liban.
- 2003-2008: El Khoury taught audio-visual at the Beirut Arab University.

=== Awards ===
In November 2007, El Khoury was awarded the National Order of the Cedar, given to him by the President at the time Émile Lahoud.

=== Chairman position after 2013 ===
After El Khoury's death on July 28, 2013, the position of chairman was very unclear, until now no permanent chairman has succeeded El Khoury; from 2014 to 2017 Talal Makdessi was a temporary head chief of the TV until a committee from the new Council of Ministers appointed a new board but before that, Makdessi was dismissed after judicial decision on May 26, 2017

== Personal life ==
El Khoury was married to television presenter Charlotte Wazen. They had two daughters.

El Khoury died on July 28, 2013, after a long illness.
