= Holy Spirit University of Kaslik =

Catholic university in Jounieh, Lebanon

Coordinates: 33°58′55″N 35°37′08″E

Holy Spirit University of Kaslik جامعة الروح القدس – الكسليك
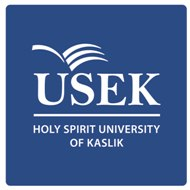
- Motto: When the Spirit of truth comes, he will lead you to the whole truth
- Type: Private
- Established: 1938
- President: Reverend Father Talal Hachem
- Vice-president: Reverend Father Elias Hanna
- Students: 6253 (Fall 2020–2021)
- Location: Kaslik, Lebanon
- Campus: Suburban 12 acres (49,000 m^{2})
- Website: usek.edu.lb

The Holy Spirit University of Kaslik (USEK; Arabic: جامعة الرّوح القدس – الكسليك, Jāmiʿah al-Rūḥ al-Quddus – al-Kaslīk) is a private, non-profit, Catholic university in Jounieh, Lebanon. The university was founded by the Baladites in 1950 and ratified under the new Higher Education Law of 1962. USEK is the first university in Lebanon to be established by Lebanese citizens.

== History ==
During a time when the educational gap was strongly felt across the country, the Baladites were compelled to establish their scholasticate (a college-level school of general study for those preparing for membership in a Catholic religious order) in 1938 in Kaslik. It was one of the first educational establishments to be validated by the new education law in the Ministry of Education.

The university began as a one-building institution before expanding in 1950 to include new buildings leading to the current purpose-built twelve acres (49,000 m2) campus at the same site. The campus buildings for six schools and one faculty, a nursing institute, a center for learning and teaching, a center for continuing education, an infirmary, administration offices, library, amphitheater, archeological museum, sports center, bookshop, female dorms, and guest house which are arranged around a central tree-lined walkway, connected to a central plaza and green spaces.

When USEK officially became a higher education institution in 1962, it already stood out as a liberal arts university, adding a new faculty or school every 5 to 10 years to include all the major academic fields - the arts, architecture, business, engineering, humanities, and sciences. Initially, these were taught primarily in French and Arabic until the university converted to the American Credit System in 1997, and since then almost all courses are taught in English.

USEK has rankings in three major league tables for the Near/Middle East. In 2021, it was ranked 2nd best university in Lebanon according to SCImago Institutions Rankings (SIR). Also, in 2021 it was ranked 1st Green University in Lebanon for the 4th consecutive year, 3rd in the Arab World and 117th worldwide according to UI GreenMetric World University Ranking. In 2020 it ranked 30th in the Arab region according to QS Arab University Rankings and among the top 650 universities in the world according to QS World University Rankings.

With a focus on comprehensive internationalization, the university has more than 250 international partnerships worldwide and is a member of around 150 international associations specialized in different fields. USEK was the only university outside the Americas to be part of the Internationalization Laboratory of the American Council of Education in the USA.

Along with seven other universities in Lebanon, it is a member of E-TALEB, an EU co-funded professional standards framework for excellence in Lebanese universities. The current president is Father Talal Hachem, since 2019.

== Artifacts ==
Religious treasures on campus include relics of Saint Charbel placed in the foundations of the original chapel in 1948, and Our Lady of Ilige, a 10th-century icon representing the Virgin Mary, the oldest Maronite icon, is conserved in the university archeological museum.

The USEK Library is home to one of the few surviving copies of the Book of Psalms, printed in 1610 on the first-ever printing press of the Levant region. This version is written in Garshouni, a script that Turkish rulers at the time could not understand.

Lebanon’s most famous literary figure, Gibran Khalil Gibran features prominently at the university, which has restored hard copies of his works. As a show of gratitude, a license has been granted to keep digitalized copies of the complete collection for research purposes.

Lebanon’s iconic Martyrs’ memorial statue, which was damaged during the civil war in Beirut, was transported to USEK a few years after the end of hostilities to be restored by the university’s Sacred Art Department and local experts. It was returned to Downtown Beirut after its restoration.

== Campus ==
The purpose-built campus is located in Kaslik, Jounieh 19.7 km north of Lebanon’s capital, Beirut.

Kaslik Campus

The Kaslik site has been expanded and remodeled at regular intervals over the last 50 years. The north side of the campus has a view of the southern end of Mount Lebanon (بْنَان, Jabal Lubnān) and the west side the Mediterranean Sea and bay of Jounieh. The campus buildings are positioned around a tree-lined walkway. The walkway runs from south (main entrance) to north (Science Building) and is flanked by beautiful landscaped green spaces, specifically designed, to integrate social and teaching areas.

Key for Academic Units
| Building AA Administration, AC Student Service, G | Building D Business School, LTEC and UCLC |
| Administrative/technical offices | Building E Agronomy |
| Buildings AB/AC Letters | Building F Female residence ‘The Foyer’ |
| Building AM School of Music and Performing Arts | Building G Administrative and Technical Offices |
| Building B Sacred Arts, Theology, Liturgy, Law and Political and Social Sciences | Building H Sciences |
| Building C Arts & Architecture | Building I Sports Department and tennis courts |

Buildings AA, G, and the lower floors of AC house the main administrative and technical offices.

Buildings AC, AB, AM, B, C, D, E, H, and I are for schools, faculty, and other educational units.

Building F - USEK is a mostly non-residential university except for a modest residence for female students, providing common living spaces, 24/7 on-site staff and security. It has one of the most distinctive interiors building on campus. Nautically themed, it resembles the inside of a ship, with portholes, a network of fixed gangplanks and a small chapel at the position of a control room.

Regional University Centers

The university opened its three regional university centers (RUCs) in 2000 and 2001 as part of its sense of duty to make education accessible across the country. The educational mission and objectives of the RUCs are the same as those of the university.

The three RUCs include:

RUC Chekka – located 65 km north of Beirut - offers undergraduate courses from USEK Business School and the School of Law and Political Sciences.

RUC Rmeich – located 115 KM south of Beirut - offers an undergraduate program specializing in the field of business.

RUC Zahle - Located 55 km east of Beirut - offers undergraduate programs across most core disciplines, including applied arts, architecture, agriculture, business and commercial sciences, engineering, fine arts, food sciences, humanities, law, philosophy, and sciences.

Other off-site campus buildings

The Medical School The latest expansion of the university was completed in 2018 with the official opening of the Francois Bassil Medical Building, an off-campus Medical School, which is located 24.5 km north of Kaslik in Hboub, Jbeil. To complement this, the University Hospital Center was created in partnership with Notre Dame de Secours hospital in Jbeil for USEK medical students to receive hands-on medical training.

Kaslik Library

The monasteries and seminaries of the Lebanese Maronite Order (OLM) have always had well-appointed libraries. In the 1980s and 1990s, generous donations to the university enabled the library to transform and develop its collection, and from 2000 onwards, in addition to newly acquired collections of print books and journals, the library updated its systems and increased its range of electronic resources.

Important Collections

The library has notable collections of rare books and incunabula of historical and cultural significance and are an invaluable research source. The libraries rare books and incunabula include works in Arabic, English, French, German, Italian, Latin, Ancient Greek, Syriac, and Garshuni. Special collections include approximately 2,000 manuscripts, handwritten in Syriac, Arabic, Latin, and Greek, covering theology, Islam, philosophy, Syriac and Arabic grammar, literature, astronomy, history, and more. Many of these manuscripts are translations from Latin to Garshuni (Arabic in Syriac letters), and some are unique, like OLM 263, which is claimed to be the oldest Maronite Syriac Liturgical textbook for the Palm Sunday Office of Readings, copied at Qozhaya Monastery in 1493. The newspapers and periodicals collections acquired by USEK since the opening of the library include titles of research and heritage importance include Al-Hoda, New Lebanese American Journal, Al-Muhajjer, AlHaqiqa, Al-Maarad and Al-Moktataf. Between 2015 and 2016, the library was extensively remodeled to accommodate the major cultural heritage centers of the university under its roof, including the Conservation and Restoration Center (CRC), the Digital Development Center (DDC), and the Phoenix Center for Lebanese Studies (PCLS).

The Conservation and Restoration Center

Established in 2002, the Conservation and Restoration Center manages the conservation and restoration of heritage collections including manuscripts, rare and valuable books, archives, maps, and photos to enable the library to make its collections accessible for research. The center also provides conservation and restoration services for the private collections of individuals, families, collectors, dioceses, municipalities, and universities.

The Digital Development Center

Between 2014 and 2015 DDC has been upgraded to the digitization of all library collections and rare materials and make them available to teachers, researchers, individuals in the USEK community, and visiting library users.

The Phoenix Center for Lebanese Studies

Home to a large archive of Lebanese heritage for researchers and students of cultural and scientific research. These archives represent the memory, history, originality, and identity of Lebanon, and include the major collections of key Lebanese historical, political, and literary figures in history such as Camille Chamoun, Fouad Chehab, Elias Sarkis, Bachir Gemayel, Lady Yvonne Sursock Cochrane, Adonis and Joseph Nehme, Wadih El Safi, Salah Tizani (Abou Salim), Maurice Gemayel, Youssef El Sawda, Kamal El Salibi, Gibran Khalil Gibran, Elias Abou Chabke, Bechara El Khoury (Al Akhtal as-Saghir).

The Museum

The library also oversees the Archeological Museum, which houses more than 4,000 archeological items, organized into collections going back to prehistoric times.

USEK Publications Office (PUSEK)

USEK Publications (PUSEK) is the university press responsible for publishing and archiving proceedings of colloquiums, symposiums and conferences organized at the university, as well as proceedings of archives and scientific magazines, scientific books, monographs, diplomatic archives of Lebanon and the Middle East region and manuscripts promoting the Lebanese and Maronite heritage.

PUSEK also edits, publishes and distributes hard copies and digital work of university researchers and research groups in all the major disciplinary fields: Letters, Human Sciences, Law, Business Sciences, Theology, Liturgy, Music, Medicine, Fine Arts, Sacred Art, and Agricultural Sciences.

SCOPUS and Open Access.

SCOPUS has indexed two university journals so far, and PUSEK is in the process of preparing its e-books for Open Access.

USEK Sustainability Office and the Green Committee

The university works on many internal levels to cultivate the mindset of sustainability within the community.

The establishment of the Office of Sustainability and academic and research centers in 2010, and the Green Committee in 2016 consolidated efforts between on-campus partners and built a robust and workable sustainability strategy to advance the environmental management of the institution, increase its environmental and social performance, and embed sustainable practice across the campus.

In 2017, the university launched its Material Recovery Facility (MRF), located next to the student parking, where collected recyclables are stored and dispatched to local eco-driven companies for safe disposal. The university’s recycling program complies with the LEED materials and resources requirement.

2018 the university committed to the UN Sustainable Goals (SDGs) and the UN Global Compact to help frame and guide its activities.

Sustainable Rankings - GreenMetric and Times Higher Education UN SDGs

Within a year of the creation of the Green Committee, USEK was ranked by GreenMetric World University Ranking 2017 as 1st Green University in Lebanon and among the 10 ‘Greenest’ Universities in the Arab World.

In 2019 - 1st Sustainable and Green University in Lebanon and 3rd Most Sustainable and Green University in the Arab World of that year.

In 2020 - 1st sustainable and Green University in Lebanon for the third consecutive year, and 4th most sustainable and Green University in the MENA Region

In 2021, USEK was ranked by UI GreenMetric Worldwide as 1st Green University in Lebanon for five consecutive years, 3rd in the Arab world and 117th worldwide.

In 2021 USEK ranked 1st, joint-1st and 2nd in Lebanon in the Times Higher Education Impact rankings for the UN SDGs, No Poverty, Reduced Inequalities and Affordable and Clean Energy.

== Organization and Administration ==
Academic and Administrative Units

In 2019 the university reorganized its academic structure into six schools, one faculty, the USEK Continuing Learning Center (UCLC) and the Learning and Teaching Excellence center (LTEC).

- USEK Business School (UBS)
- School of Architecture & Design
- School of Engineering
- School of Law and Political Sciences
- School of Medicine and Medical Sciences
- School of Music and Performing Arts
- Pontifical School of Theology
- Higher Institute of Nursing Sciences
- Faculty of Arts and Sciences
- USEK Continuing Learning Center (UCLC)
- Learning and Teaching Excellence Center (LTEC)

Academic Accreditation

| Date | Accreditation Body |
|---|---|
| 2019-2024 | The Association of Medical Education Programs Evaluation and Accreditation TEPDAD |
| 2019 | NAAB for Master of Architecture |
| 2018 | ABET Accreditation for two applied and natural sciences and the civil engineering programs. |
| 2017-2022 | evalag European Institutional Accreditation |
| 2017 | evalag accreditation for the Humanities and Social Sciences Programs |
| 2016 | ABET accreditation for nine Computing and Engineering programs. |
| Ongoing | AACSB - Association to Advance Collegiate Schools of Business |

Administrative Offices

The following various administrative and technical departments that exist outside of the six schools and one faculty include:

| Admissions Office | Legal Affairs Office |
| Advancement Office | Library |
| Alumni Office | Organizational Development |
| Architecture and Maintenance Office | Press Office |
| Asher Center for Innovation and Entrepreneurship | Proctoring Office |
| Career Services Office | Public Relations Office |
| Campus Safety and Security Office | Quality Assurance and Institutional Effectiveness Office |
| Communications and Events Office | Registrar Office |
| Courier Service | Relations with Public Administration Office |
| Editing Office | Social Services Office |
| Green Committee | Sports Service |
| Human Resources - Administrative and Technical Personnel Office | Student Affairs Office |
| Human Resources | Teaching Personnel Office |
| International Affairs Office | University Chaplain Office |
| Internal Audit | USEK Counseling Center |
| IT Office | USEK Publications Office (PUSEK) |

Accreditation

| Accreditation Award | Accreditation Body |
| 2018–Present | Matrix for Student Services |

Governance

The university is governed by two main statutory bodies: the University Board of Trustees and The Academic and Research Council The University Council, chaired by the University President is the main governing body, consisting of deans and directors, along with representatives of staff and students. It is responsible for the proper management and financial solvency of the university, with major policy decisions and corporate strategy being subject to its approval. Decisions made by the University Council are communicated to the community every month. Academic and Research Council which oversees academic management and sets strategy and priorities, including curriculum and maintenance of standards and consists of dean and heads of departments, along with student reps.

Key leadership positions at the university:

- The President
- Vice-President
- Vice-President for Community Life
- Vice-President for Finance

Other appointed and elected group of individuals that have an influential role in the university:

- The Board of Trustees
- Student Representatives

== Academic profile ==
Admissions

In fall 2020-2021, USEK received 2056 individual applicants, out of which 1728 were accepted and 1467 were enrolled. An applicant can select up to three majors and each choice is considered as an application.

When the economic crisis hit Lebanon and the value of the lira went into free fall, USEK was one of the few universities to decide to keep the same rate of dollar/lira exchange and keep education affordable for applicants. Throughout the economic collapse in Lebanon, student enrollment at the university dropped by XX percent, one of the lowest decreases in student enrolment in the country.

To try and assist students further, the university increased its financial aid:

In 2020 - 25% of the total amount of tuition fees were covered by the financial aid compared to 16% in 2011

In Fall 2021

- 1923 students benefitted from financial aid discount & 5500 students benefitted from different reduction types
- 81 students benefited from sponsor donations
- Student job applications were put on hold since spring 2020 due to COVID-19 measures

Reputation and Rankings

Most recent rankings
| Year | Ranking | Ranking Body |
|---|---|---|
| 2021 | 2nd best university in Lebanon | SCImago Institutions Rankings (SIR) |
| 2021 | 1st Green University in Lebanon (for the 4th consecutive year) | UI GreenMetric World University Ranking |
| 2021 | 3rd Green University in the Arab World | UI GreenMetric World University Ranking |
| 2021 | 117th Green University Worldwide | UI GreenMetric World University Ranking |
| 2020 | 30th university in the Arab region | QS Arab University Rankings |
| 2020 | In the top 650 universities in the world | QS Arab University Rankings |

International Agreements and Joint Program Agreements

USEK has 38 international general agreements 38, membership to 71 international organizations, and 124 cooperation agreements with foreign higher education institutions.

Joint program agreements include:
| Program Name | Double Diploma / collaboration |
|---|---|
| Executive Master of Business Administration | ESSCA |
| Master of Business Administration - Human Resources | Université Pantheon-ASSAS Paris II |
| Master of Business Administration - Management and International Affairs | HEC MONTREAL |
| Master of Science in Cybersecurity and Cyberdefence | UBS |
| Master of Science in Communications Engineering | Université de Bordeaux |
| Master’s in Business Law | Université de Poitiers |

Research

USEK’s Higher Center for Research (HCR) defines and promotes the university research policy and has partnerships with academic and non-academic institutions nationally and internationally. The six major research units include:

- RU1 Health Sciences and Technologies.
- RU2 Patrimony: heritage and memory. | Identity, Diversity and Ethics.
- RU3 Artificial Intelligence (AI), Internet of Things (IOT) & Dynamic Data Analysis. | Advancing Information and Communication Technologies.
- RU4 Sustainable Development.
- RU5 Architecture, Urban Planning and Design.
- RU6 Law, Policies and Security

USEK Continuing Learning Center (UCLC)

Founded in 2015, the UCLC provides various short courses for education and personal development to its local community as well as a summer school program for foreigners who want to study Lebanese language and culture.

== Student life ==
The university values the importance of a sense of community and belonging among its students, and part of this is provided by its student services offices, social associations and clubs, pastoral work, cultural trips, and student gatherings.

Student Services Offices and Student Satisfaction

USEK is the first university in Lebanon and the region to gain accreditation for its student support services which include student affairs, financial aid, chaplaincy, counseling center, career services, IT, and admissions.

The Office of Institutional Research and Assessment monitors and evaluates all feedback from students. The university provides two student satisfaction surveys at the end of every semester:

The Student Well-being Survey measures student satisfaction regarding the administrative and academic services provided by the university.

The Course Feedback by Students (CFS), an anonymous survey, is an American Style evaluation tool that complies with the highest international standards. During the COVID-19 pandemic, a new section, “Evaluation of the Online Learning Experience”, was added to the survey.

Student Representatives

USEK organizes a draw every academic year to select student representatives for every department and school. The role of the student representative is to voice the concerns of students, put forward students’ ideas to tackle specific challenges, and promote activities and events. They meet every other week during the semester.

The Office of International Student Services

The Office of International Student Services helps international students with information about immigration issues, provides support for academic and cultural adjustment, and offers opportunities for involvement in the university community. International students have the chance to intimately learn about American culture IDEA: Involvement in the University Community - Green Committee

Sports

The university has teams for basketball, volleyball, football, futsal, table tennis, ski, tennis, chess, fencing, combat sports and athletics. Specialized trainers coach the teams to represent USEK in national and international university competitions, and students are regularly selected to represent Lebanon in national teams.

The Choir

The Choir of Kaslik was founded in the same as the university, in 1950. This first all-male choir consisted of young scholastics (17–25 years in age) and postulants (11–15-year-old boys) from the same Order.

The importance of this choir plays an ecclesial and liturgical role, and an artistic and patrimonial role in the preservation and the promotion of authentic Arabic and Lebanese music. This choir was the principal execution tool of liturgical and musical reforms that took place within the Holy Spirit University of Kaslik had an influence on the Maronite Church in Lebanon and beyond its borders. Through concerts and records, the choir revitalized an authentic Lebanese and Arabic musical heritage.

Student Chapters

USEK is affiliated to international recognized chapters in a most of its schools. The role of the student chapters is to activate students and link them to the global scene. USEK student chapters are:

- ASME - Mechanical Eng. Students
- ASCE - Civil Eng. Students
- AICHE - Chemical Eng. Student
- IEEE - Electrical, Biomedical, Telecommunications, Computer Eng. Students
- IEEE - EMBS - Biomedical Eng. Students
- IEEE - PES - Electrical, Telecommunications, Biomedical and Computer
- RDCL - School of Business
- AIAS - Chapter 11 - USEK students

The Chaplain Office |Pastoral | The Marian Apostolic Movement |Scouts

The USEK Chaplain Office is located in Building B and aims to support all pastoral and social activities, namely liturgical celebrations, biblical sharing sessions, spiritual accompaniment, conferences, spiritual retreats, pilgrimages, humanitarian and social activities, socio-cultural outings, and sports activities. The chaplain is involved in pastoral and scout events of the USEK University Pastoral, the Marian Apostolic Movement and Scout Spirit.

The USEK University Pastoral

Founded by the Assembly of the Catholic Patriarchs and Bishops in Lebanon in 1979 and officially recognized by the Lebanese State in 1988, Pastoral provides a space for all USEK students leading a Christian life and engaged in spiritual reflection.

The Marian Apostolic Movement

A Christian secular movement founded originally in Lebanon in 1973 and 2017 at the university. It honours the Blessed Virgin Mary as their role model. The USEK branch of this movement brings together current and former members with the aim of supporting the mission of the Lebanese Maronite Order at the university.

Scout Spirit

Founded in 2017, Scout Spirit brings together students from all the different scout associations in Lebanon to celebrate the values of the scouting movement through a range of activities.

== Notable Alumni ==
- Charbel Abdallah
- Eddy Abillammaa
- Michel Abrass
- Youssef Absi
- Ad Achkar
- Aleph (pianist)
- Rony Barrak
- Issam John Darwich
- Yousif Habash
- Gilbert Hage
- Elias Hankash
- Ziad Hawat
- Julia Kassar
- Wael Kfoury
- Georges Khabbaz
- Giselle Khoury
- Marwan Khoury
- Pamela El Kik
- Edgard Madi
- Camille Moubarak
- Elissar Naddaf
- Abeer Nehme
- Jean-Marie Riachi
- Charbel Rouhana
- Basil Soda
- Joseph Soueif

== See also ==
- List of universities in Lebanon
- Centre Hospitalier Universitaire Notre Dame des Secours Jbeil
- Official site.
