= Gilbert Hage =

Lebanese photographer (born 1966)

Gilbert Hage (born in Beirut, Lebanon, 1966) is a Lebanese photographer. He studied at the Université Saint-Esprit de Kaslik and teaches there since 1990. He also teaches at the Académie Libanaise des Beaux-Arts ALBA. He sometimes collaborates with curator and researcher Ghada Waked, his wife, and is co-publisher and co-editor, with Jalal Toufic, of Underexposed Books.

== Work ==
In 2004, he introduced Ici et Maintenant (Here and now), an encyclopedia like collection of large scale portraits of Lebanese citizens aged 18–30, all posing in the same position and looking directly at the camera.

Gilbert Hage took advantage of cell phones cameras to take shots of women’s cleavage in his series Phone[Ethics] that was part of the 2011 Rencontres d'Arles.

In the Aftermath of the 2006 Lebanon War, Hage documented buildings in Beirut's southern suburbs that were bombed, in a frontal and monumental framing.

In 2009, Gilbert Hage produced a series of Eleven Views of Mount Ararat. Referring to Hokusai’s Thirty-six Views of Mount Fuji, the photos depict representations of the famous mountains in homes of the Armenian community in Lebanon.

In 2018, Gibert Hage was selected to be part of The Place That Remains, the first national Pavilion of Lebanon curated by Hala Younes at the Venice Biennale of Architecture

== Publications ==
- Here And Now (Alba University of Balamand, 2017)
- Ana, Berthe, Emmanuelle...... (Underexposed, 2013)
- I Hated You Already Because Of The Lies I Had Told You (Underexposed, 2013)
- 242cm2 (Underexposed, 2012)
- With Strings Attached (underexposed, 2012)
- Toufican Ruins? With Jalal Toufic (Underexposed, 2010)
- Screening Berlin (Underexposed, 2010)
- Eleven views of Mount Ararat (Underexposed, 2009)
- Ici et maintenant (Galerie Tanit, 2005)
- Beirut (Galerie Alice Mogabgab, 2004)
- 28 Roses b/w (Galerie Alice Mogabgab, 1999)

== Selected exhibitions ==
=== Solo exhibitions ===
- Galerie Tanit, Beirut, 2017
- Galerie Tanit, Munich, 2012
- Espace Kettaneh Kunigk, Beirut, 2012
- French Cultural Center, Beirut, 2010
- Espace Kettaneh Kunigk, Beirut, 2009
- University of Balamand, 2006
- Espace SD, Beirut, 2004
- Galerie Alice Mogabgab, Beirut, 2004
- Galerie Tanit, Munich, 2004
- Galerie Alice Mogabgab, Beirut, 2002
- Galerie Alice Mogabgab, Beirut, 1999

=== Group exhibitions ===
- Third Biennale of Contemporary Arab Photographers, Arab World Institute, Paris, 2019
- Across Boundaries. Focus on Lebanese Photography, curated by Tarek Nahas, Beirut Art Fair 2018
- The Place that Remains, Lebanese Pavilion, 16th Venice Biennale of Architecture, 2018
- Arts Santa Monica, Barcelona, 2013
- Katara, Doha, 2012
- Foto Museum, Anvers, 2012
- Subtitled-Royal College Of Art, London, 2011
- Thessaloniki Museum of Photography, Thessaloniki, October 2011
- Rencontres d'Arles, Arles, 2011
- Sharjah Biennial, Sharjah, 2011
- White Box, Munich, 2010
- Kunsthal_Rotterdam, 2009
- Kunsthalle, Vienna, 2007
- Casa arabe, Madrid, 2007
- Institute of contemporary art, Dunaujvaros, 2007
- Arabise me, Victoria & Albert Museum, London, 2006 -
- Out of Beirut, Modern Art Oxford, 2006
- Haus der Kulturen der Welt, Berlin, 2005
- Mantes la jolie, 2004
- Vidéo Brazil, São Paulo, 2003
- Galerie V+A, Berlin, 2002
