= OTV (Lebanese TV channel) =

- Current logo as of 2025.

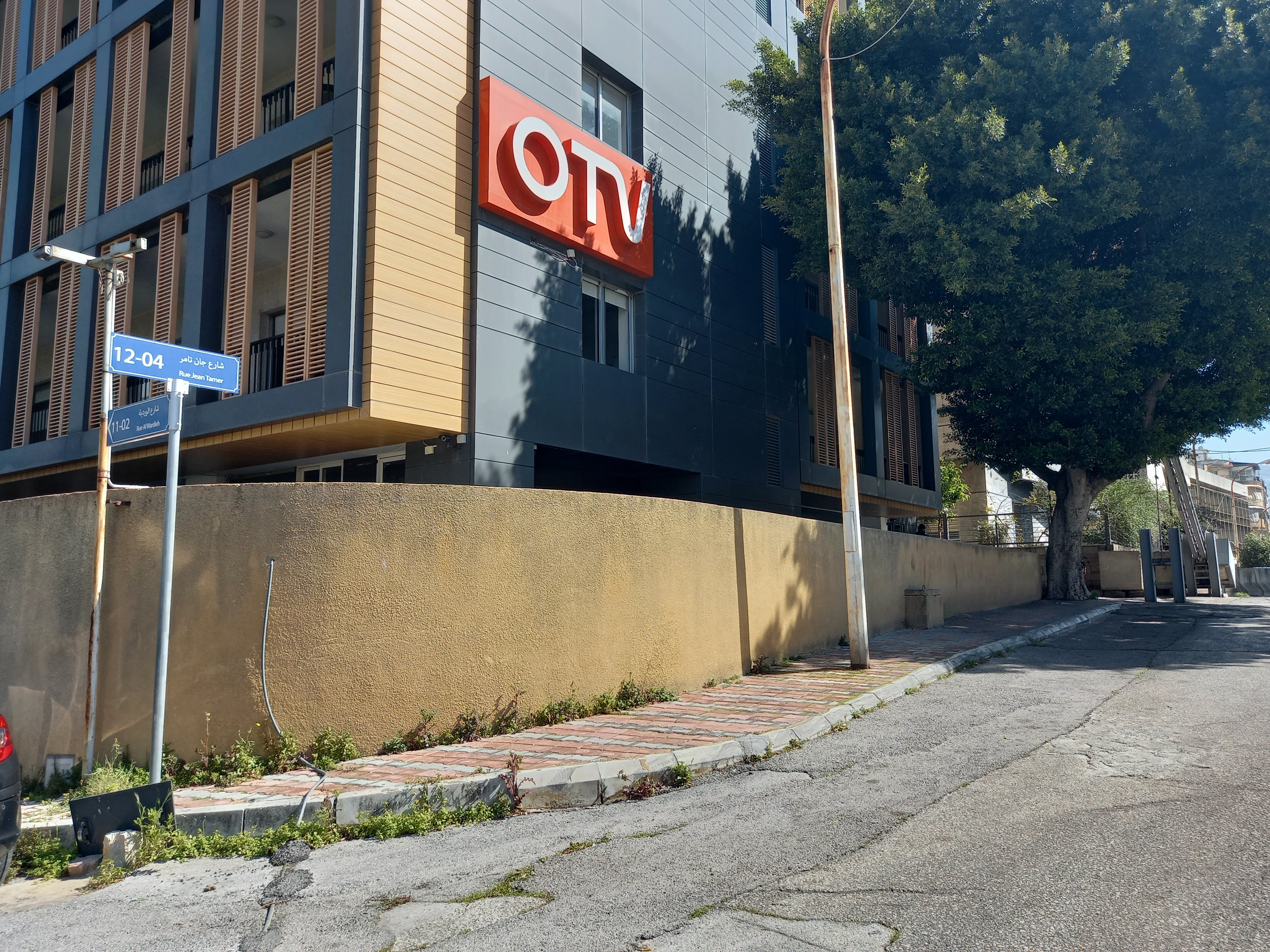
- Country: Lebanon
- Broadcast area: Lebanon; Worldwide (via internet)

Programming
- Languages: Arabic, French, Armenian
- Picture format: 16:9 (576i, SDTV)

Ownership
- Owner: OTV Holding

History
- Launched: May 2007 (television network)

Links
- Website: OTV website

OTV (Arabic: أو تي في, launched in 2007) is a publicly traded television station in Lebanon that is affiliated with the Free Patriotic Movement political party (التيار اللوطني الحر). It is nicknamed 'Orange TV' due to its orange logo, and the fact that the FPM, which the network has affiliations to, uses orange colors.

== Launching ==
OTV began broadcasting on 20 July 2007 on the Arabsat satellite, on the 11823 MHz frequency, but launched officially in 2008 after a testing period of almost six months.

Outside of Lebanon, OTV broadcasts worldwide through both a wide range of different broadcasting channels for the United Kingdom, European Union, Canada, United States, Australia, and the Arab world, and via the internet, in which its website and social media accounts offers live-streaming coverage. OTV targets all Lebanese in particular and Arabs in general.

== Corporate structure ==
Al Lubnaniah Lil I'Lam SAL is the Lebanese joint stock company, titular of the OTV television broadcasting license granted by the Lebanese Council of Ministers on 22 June 2006. OTV (Holding) SAL is an investment company.

== News Bulletins ==
- In Arabic: 07:00 - 14:15 - 19:45 (main bulletin) - 23.30
- In Armenian: 16:30

The network's previous logo, used from launch until 2025.

== Programs ==
- Next (daily variety show)
- بالمباشر (weekly political talk show)
- Agenda اليوم (Daily early morning show)
- Kazadoo (Kid's show)
- يوم جديد (Daily morning show)
- حوار أليوم (Daily political talk show)
- ضروري نحكي We need to talk (Weekly social political show)
- LOL (Entertainment show)
- Min La Min (Entertainment show)
- الحق يقال-ماغي فرح (Political talk show)
- Reflex (Social talk show)
- OVRIRA (Comedy show)
- Beirut عيش (Variety show)
- Made in Paris (Variety show)
- Khod Khbaron Men Neswenon (Entertainment show)
- Khabar aw Khabrieh (News show)
- فكّر مرّتين (Political /social talk show)
- Wayn Saro (Documentaries)
- Fi al Tafassil (Political/social talk Show)
- No'ta Fassleh (Cultural/social talk Show)
- Meen Lameen (Social/game Show)
- Tleteen layle w layle (Ramadan Variety Show)
- O Cinema (Cinema news)
- O sport (Sport news)
- Todd w Aya (Animated show for kids)
- Fish khel2ak (Daily social show)
- Puzzle (Game show)
- Be Lebnan (Game show)
- فكرة عالنار (Ramadan cooking show)
- شو بتتوقع؟ (Predictions with Mike Feghaly)
- مقلب مرتّب (Ramadan comedy show)
- عشرة بعد النشرة (Daily political/comedy show)
- Les Aventures de Jad et Nour (Kids)
- Very Very Chatoura (Ramadan cooking show)
- Boukra Elna (Social/educational show)
- الحياة أقوى (Ramadan social show)
- Mina al Chaeeb (Reports)
- الصليب الأحمر 140 (Reality/social show)
- إيمانك خلصك (Social/religious show)
- أنوار رمضان (Social/religious show)
- La2La2a (Talk show)
- Oof (Lebanese Zajal show)
- جايين نجرّبكن (Cooking/ Reality show)
- Abou el Abed & Co (Comedy show)
- MicroScoop (Entertainment news show)
- Laouna al Seha (Game show)
- Face e Profile (Entertainment news show)
- بين السطور (Political talk show)
- عنار لطيفه (Daily Cooking show)
- حديث أخر (Talk show)
- Paris je T'M (Entertainment, lifestyle, Fashion show)
- ليلة من العمر (Lifestyle, Fashion show)
- Look Jdeed (Entertainment, lifestyle, Fashion show)
- كلام هونيك ناس (Comedy talk show)
- What's up (Lifestyle)
- جيل الإنجيل (Social/religion), presented by Father Joseph Soueid

== Availability ==
The network also broadcasts worldwide via certain satellite and cable packages alongside internet broadcasting:

- In the Arab World, Europe, Africa, the network is broadcasts from Arabsat Badr 4.
- United States and Canada: OTV is available on certain cable packages, which include Dish Network in the US and MySatGo in Canada.
- Australia: Broadcasts on Intelsat 8
- France: OTV is available on certain cable packages provided by Free, Orange, Bouygues Télécom, Virgin, and SFR, and is part of the "Bouquet Libanais" collection.
- UK: OTV is available on certain streaming platforms (i.e., Roku, Samsung Smart TV, Now TV Box and the Online TV portal) and is also included in Arabia One.
- Sweden: OTV is available as part of the Arabic bouquet on Zone TV.
- Lebanon: Aires terrestrially on both satellite and digital.

== See also ==
- Television in Lebanon
- MTV
- LBC
- NBN
- Future TV
