= Jalal Toufic =

Lebanese artist

Jalal Toufic is a Lebanese artist, filmmaker, and author of various publications.

== Biography ==
Born to an Iraqi father and a Palestinian mother, he has lived in Lebanon, and his work often reflects his heritage. He is co-publisher and co-editor, with Gilbert Hage, of Underexposed Books.

== Publications ==
- Distracted (1991)
- (Vampires): An Uneasy Essay on the Undead in Film (1993)
- Over-Sensitivity (1996)
- Forthcoming (2000)
- Undying Love, or Love Dies (2002)
- ‘Âshûrâ’: This Blood Spilled in My Veins (2005)
- Two or Three Things I’m Dying to Tell You (2005)
- Undeserving Lebanon (2007)
- The Withdrawal of Tradition Past a Surpassing Disaster (2009)
- Graziella: The Corrected Edition (2009)
- What Is the Sum of Recurrently? (2010)
- The Portrait of the Pubescent Girl: A Rite of Non-Passage (2011)
- What Were You Thinking? (2011)
- The Dancer's Two Bodies (2015)
- What Was I Thinking? (2017)

== Exhibitions ==
=== Group exhibitions ===
- Cycles of Collapsing Progress, Rashid Karami International Fair, Tripoli, Lebanon, 2018
- Beirut Lab: 1975(2020) Curated by Juli Carson and Yassmeen Tukan, University Art Gallery, University of California, Irvine, 2019
