= Arabian Nights: Sinbad's Adventures =

Japanese anime television series

- Sindbad and human-form Shera on a magic carpet, with bird-form Shera flying beside them.
- アラビアンナイト シンドバットの冒険
- Genre: Fantasy, adventure, historical
- Written by: Itsuo Kamijo; Michio Satō; Mitsurou Kotaki; Niisan Takahashi; Ryūzō Nakanishi; Shunichi Yukimuro; Toyohiro Andō; Yutaka Kaneko
- Directed by: Fumio Kurokawa
- Music by: Shunsuke Kikuchi
- Country of origin: Japan
- Original language: Japanese
- No. of episodes: 52

Production
- Executive producer: Kōichi Motohashi
- Producers: Seitaro Kodama; Yoshio Kato
- Editor: Mishihashi Furukawa
- Production companies: Nippon Animation; Fuji Television; Dentsu

Original release
- Network: FNS (Fuji TV)
- Release: 1 October 1975 – 29 September 1976

Arabian Nights: Sinbad's Adventures (アラビアンナイト シンドバットの冒険, Arabian Naito: Shindobatto no Bōken) is a 52-episode anime series directed by Fumio Kurokawa and produced by Nippon Animation which was first aired in 1975. The story is based on the story of "Sinbad the Sailor" and other stories from One Thousand and One Nights.

== Synopsis ==
Sinbad is a young boy and the son of a famous merchant from Baghdad. Sinbad especially enjoys listening to the adventure stories of his uncle Ali who has brought Sinbad a strange speaking bird named Shera with him from his journeys. Sinbad joins his uncle, in hope of being a part of his uncle's next adventure. After a giant whale attacks the boat, Sinbad ends up on a deserted island. Separated from his uncle, Sinbad begins the adventure alone with only Shera for company. When he returns home from his first adventures, he finds to his shock that his parents are missing, since they have gone to find him and were apparently lost at sea. With no formal ties left at home in Baghdad, Sinbad sets out again in search for adventure.

Throughout the series, Sinbad journeys to different destinations together with Shera and his friends - Ali Baba and Aladdin. They encounter a number of strange creatures, including a giant bird, gigantic snakes, mermaids, genies, Lilliputians, and hostile magicians. He also meets several other characters and enacts stories featured in Arabian Nights, including the Forty Thieves, the stories of The Genie and the Merchant, or the Flying Horse. In the end, after Sinbad has vanquished the evil magicians coming after his life, all whom he loves rejoin him, including his lost parents and his uncle, who have been captured by a malevolent supreme sorceress.

== Cast of characters ==
=== Protagonists ===
Sinbad (シンドバット, Sindobatto)
The main character of the series, Sinbad is portrayed as the young and only son of a merchant and his wife who, inspired by his sea-faring uncle Ali, yearns for adventure. Despite his young age, he is extraordinarily clever and resourceful and manages to make his way through any obstacle he encounters.
Shera (シェーラー, Shiērā)
An intelligent, talking bird (a slightly oversized myna) who initially belonged to Sinbad's uncle Ali before he bequeathed her to his nephew. As it is revealed later, Shera is actually a human princess transformed by a malevolent sorcerer, cursed to remain permanently in that form if she willingly tells anyone of her plight. In the course of the series, Sinbad finds out about her condition and eventually helps her and her parents regain their human forms.
Hassan (ハッサン, Hassan)
A young boy from a poor family and Sinbad's best friend despite his low status. He supports his family (of which his three younger brothers are most prominently shown) as a water seller's assistant in the streets of Baghdad.
Ali Baba (アリババ, Aribaba)
A young, adventurous desert raider and a former member of a robber gang. He was born in Baghdad, but abducted by a slaver as a child and rescued by the bandits who adopted him. After meeting and befriending Sinbad, he has a change of heart and accompanies the boy on his adventures.
Aladdin (アラジン, Arajin)
An old man who once possessed a Genie lamp which fulfilled all his wishes, but lost it many years ago and subsequently fell on hard times. While working as a ferryman on the Nile, a river genie stole his boat, but after Sinbad tricks the genie into submission, Aladdin accompanies Sinbad on his adventures, serving him with a lifetime's worth of accumulated wisdom.
Mermaid Princess (人魚姫, Ningyo hime)
A mermaid who is caught by Sinbad while he is helping a poor fisherman. When he releases her unconditionally, she befriends him and continues to help him on several occasions whenever his adventures lead to the sea.
Captain Ali (アリ船長, Ari senchō)
Sinbad's sea-faring uncle and Shera's original owner, whose tales of faraway lands inspire Sinbad to go adventuring.
Sinbad's Father (父親, Chichioya)
Sinbad's father is a wealthy and renowned merchant in Bagdad, who is stern but well-meaning with his son. His voice actor, Ichiro Nagai, also provides the series' narration.
Tabat (タバト, Tabato)
A female servant of Sindbad's household.
Princess Sharam (シャーラーム姫, Shiārāmu hime)
The King's young daughter, who is always eager to hear about Sinbad's adventures.
King of Bagdad (バクダットの王, Bakudatto no ō)
The ruler of Bagdad and Princess Sharam's father. In the first episode his name is revealed to be Harun al-Rashid.
Shera's Parents
The rulers of an unknown realm who were transformed into white eagles by Tabasa's son Satajit, but like their daughter have retained their human personalities.
Jian (ジャイアン, Jaian)
A pre-adolescent desert giant, Jian first meets Sinbad's group when Ali Baba runs into him and out of fear buries his dagger in Jian's foot. After Sinbad and his friends remove the blade, Jian befriends them and later saves them from being eaten by his father.
Rockle (ロックル, Rokkuru)
A roc chick which hatched from an egg a ship captain collected from a lonely island. When it hatches aboard the ship, Sinbad feeds and befriends it; in turn, Rockle later saves him from hostile natives and later helps him in his fight against the Blue Demon King's minions.

=== Antagonists ===
Tabasa (タバサ, Tabasa)
An old evil witch whose greatest weakness is her tremendrous fear of mice. She and her sons Satajit and Balba comprise Sinbad's main nemeses for most of the series.
Balba (バルバ, Baruba)
The younger son of Tabasa, who shares his penchant for evil magic with her and his brother Satajit. He performs the role of the evil sorcerer from the tale "The Ebony Horse".
Satajit (サタジッ, Satajit)
The elder son of Tabasa, and like her and his brother Balba an evil sorcerer by trade. Satajit is responsible for transforming Shera and her parents after the latter had him imprisoned for his crimes in their realm. In the series, he first appears personifying the magician from the tale "Aladdin".
Sugaru (スガール, Sugāru)
An evil sorceress who looks outwardly like a beautiful, blue-skinned young woman, but actually has the head and forehooves of a cow, though her true form is always revealed by her shadow. She is based on the evil sorceress from the tale "The Ensorcelled Prince" from "The Fisherman and the Jinni".
Blue Demon King (青の大魔王, Ao no dai maō)
A powerful, blue-skinned fiend who is the patron of all evil magicians and genies in the series.

== Japanese cast ==
- Noriko Ohara as Sinbad
- Akira Kamiya as Ali Baba
- Mahito Tsujimura as Aladdin
- Ichirō Nagai as The Narrator

== Release ==
The series was first broadcast every Wednesday at 7pm from 1 October 1975 until 29 September 1976 on Fuji TV. An international adaptation of the series that shortened the 52 episodes to 42 episodes was created in Germany in 1978 and first broadcast on ZDF. This version, with music by Christian Bruhn, was subsequently used as a base for other international adaptations, e.g. the Italian and French dubs. Lebanese director and producer Nicolas Abu Samah created an Arabic dub based on the Japanese original 52 episodes, which was aired from 1979 on.

== Episode list ==
No.	Title	Original Japanese airdate
1	""Cast Off!""; Transliteration: "Hanashi Funade!" (Japanese: 船出！)	October 1, 1975
Sinbad, the young son of a prestigious merchant in Baghdad, and his friend Hassan sneak in on a party held in the king's palace. As they watch some performers, Hassan accidentally tips over a vase, interrupting the festivities. The angry king nearly has Sinbad and his father executed, if not for his wife soothing his rage. For the rest of the night, Sinbad is locked in the cellar as punishment, where he dreams about exploring the world and a strange girl calling herself Shera. As he awakes, he is visited by his uncle Ali, a sea captain, who has just returned and now gifts him a talking pet bird, whom Sinbad names after the girl in his dream. The next morning, as Ali sets out to sea again, Sinbad sneaks and hides aboard his ship, leaving his worrying parents behind.
2	""It's Mokkuri Island""; Transliteration: "Mokkuri shimada zo" (Japanese: もっくり島だぞ)	October 8, 1975
After being found, Sinbad is taken along on the journey by his uncle. One day, an island suddenly emerges from the sea. As the crew goes ashore and lights a cooking fire, despite Shera's warnings, the "island" is revealed as a huge whale. As the crew flees to the ship, Sinbad is left behind, and Ali is apparently smashed by the whale's tail as he attempts to rescue his nephew. Joined by Shera, Sinbad endures a harrowing ride on the whale's back until he is left floating in the water. Discovering an island nearby, Sinbad and Shera head towards it. Note: This episode is based on the tale of Sinbad the Sailor's First Voyage.
3	""Roc the Giant Bird""; Transliteration: "Ōdori rokku" (Japanese: 巨鳥ロック)	October 15, 1975
While exploring the barren island, Sinbad discovers a giant egg, which belongs to an equally gigantic bird. Unnoticed, Sinbad ties himself to its leg and is taken along when the bieast departs to forage for food. He ends up in a chasm without exits and inhabited by giant snakes on another island. Sinbad discovers that the chasm contains a limitless number of diamonds, which are periodically harvested by a band of merchants using pieces of meat to collect the gems and eagles to transport them out of the chasm. Seizing his chance, Sinbad ties himself to the meat and is taken to safety. After the eagle is driven away, Sinbad shares the diamonds he has collected with the merchants and is helped on his way by them, soon rejoined by Shera. Note: This episode is based on the tale of Sinbad the Sailor's Second Voyage.
4	""The Mysterious Old Man""; Transliteration: "Ayashī rōjin" (Japanese: 怪しい老人)	October 22, 1975
The ship carrying Sinbad and Shera home stops at an island to take on fresh water. Two of its crew discover a roc egg and smash it; when the parents return, they retaliate by sinking the ship. Sinbad and Shera end up on a fertile island, where they meet an old man who asks Sinbad to carry him; but once he sits on Sinbad's shoulders, he refuses to dismount and forces Sinbad to transport him all over the island. Finally Sinbad makes some wine and tricks the old man into consuming it, getting him drunk and off his shoulders. As the old man prepares to throw a boulder at Sinbad, his inebriation makes him accidentally trigger an avalanche, which traps him long enough for Sinbad to escape. Note: This episode is based on the tale of Sinbad the Sailor's Fifth Voyage.
5	""The King of Saranjib""; Transliteration: "Saranjibu no ōsama" (Japanese: サランジブの王様)	October 29, 1975
The ship Sinbad is taking to get back home is caught in a powerful current which smashes the vessel against a rocky cliff. Sinbad, the ship's captain and a merchant survive and make their way into the island's interior, where they find a river whose bed is littered with gems, but no way off the island. Refusing to just give up, Sinbad builds a raft and drifts down the river and into a cave system, which leads him to the kingdom of Saranjib. Upon hearing from Sinbad about his adventures, the king of Saranjib sends Sinbad home with gifts and a petition to open diplomatic relationships with Baghdad. Note: This episode is based on the tale of Sinbad the Sailor's Sixth Voyage.
6	""Mountain of Ivory""; Transliteration: "Zōge no yama" (Japanese: 象牙の山)	November 5, 1975
Sinbad finally returns to Baghdad, only to find his parents gone and his home abandoned. He later meets Hassan and Tabat, a family servant, who tell him that his parents left Baghdad to look for him after Ali's crew reported him lost, only for their ship to sink in a storm. After being momentarily shattered, Sinbad regains his confidence and decides to follow in his father's footsteps as a merchant. The next day, he sets out again with the delegation from Saranjib, but they are captured by savage raiders and sold as slaves to an ivory merchant, who forces them to go hunting elephants for him. After he helps an elephant wounded in the hunt, the grateful beast takes him to a secret cave filled with more than enough ivory tusks to secure his and his companions' freedom. Note: The elephant hunt element originates from the tale of Sinbad the Sailor's Seventh Voyage.
7	""Force-Feasting...!?""; Transliteration: "Gochisō ze me...!?" (Japanese: ごちそうぜめ...！？)	November 12, 1975
After reclaiming his home, Sinbad and Shera set out with a merchant expedition, but a storm shipwrecks them and their fellow passengers on an island whose inhabitants worship vultures. After fattening their captives - except Sinbad, who suspects foul play - the merchants are one by one fed off to the vultures. Sinbad, the last one left, uses bread dough to fake having gained weight; when it is his turn, he slips out of his bonds and escapes to a more civilized area. Note: This episode is based on the tale of Sinbad the Sailor's Fourth Voyage.
8	""Fruit Gem""; Transliteration: "Konomi no hōseki" (Japanese: 木の実の宝石)	November 19, 1975
On his way home, Sinbad encounters a wealthy young man whose elderly mother longs to taste pepper again before she dies. Sinbad promises to fetch some pepper for her, but his ship is wrecked in a storm. Sinbad and some other survivors land on an island where they are trapped by a man-eating giant, who devours several members of the crew. Sinbad sets a trap for the giant to trip and smash the locked door open, and he and two survivors flee on a raft. The giant chases after them, but steps over a shelf break and drowns. Sinbad's group is picked up by a passing ship, allowing Sinbad to fulfill his promise to the old woman. Note: This episode is based on the tale of Sinbad the Sailor's Third Voyage.
9	""The Demon of the Desert""; Transliteration: "Sabaku no majin" (Japanese: 砂漠の魔人)	November 26, 1975
While joining a merchant caravan through the desert, Sinbad and Shera are separated from the others by a sandstorm. They find an oasis, and Sinbad spends his time spitting date pits around, but this accidentally kills a Desert Genie's invisible son, and his furious father prepares to kill Sinbad. Sinbad asks for seven days to settle his affairs before returning for his death sentence, which the genie permits. As he returns to the oasis, he meets an old man with a hind. In return for a lessening of Sinbad's punishment, the old man tells the genie a story of how his wife - formerly his sister-in-law - had used magic to transform his wife and son into cattle. The man had unknowingly had his wife killed, but an old wise woman turned his son back to his human self, and the treacherous wife into a hind. Note: This episode is based on the Arabian Nights tale "The Merchant and the Jinni".
10	""The Old Man of the Oasis""; Transliteration: "Oashisu no rōjin" (Japanese: オアシスの老人)	December 3, 1975
While desperately trying to avoid his dread fate, Sinbad meets another old man accompanied by two dogs, who used to be his elder brothers. While travelling with them, he met a beautiful woman who asked him to marry her, but later his brothers tossed them both into the sea to claim his fortune for themselves. The woman, however, turned out to be a witch who saved the kind man's life and transformed his greedy brothers into dogs before leaving. After the man departs, the genie prepares to kill Sinbad, but Sinbad manages to persuade him otherwise. Placated, the Desert Genie lets him go and departs. Note: This episode is based on the Arabian Nights tale "The Merchant and the Jinni".
11	""Black Pearl""; Transliteration: "Kuroi shinju" (Japanese: 黒い真珠)	December 10, 1975
Sinbad once again travels by ship when a storm sweeps him overboard, but he is rescued by a poor fisherman named Judel and his friend Saleem. When Judel gets injured, Sinbad takes up fishing to repay him for his kindness. One day, Sinbad catches a beautiful mermaid. Despite Shera's suggestions to sell her to get money, Sinbad sets her free; in return, the mermaid gifts him a black pearl, which gets him enough money to take care of Judel.
12	""The Mermaid's Gift""; Transliteration: "Ningyo no okurimono" (Japanese: 人魚の贈物)	December 17, 1975
While Sinbad continues fishing for Judel until he recovers, the mermaid returns and asks him to buy some fruits for her people, repaying him with a basket full of gems. When he and Saleem try to exchange them for money, they and Judel are arrested as suspected thieves. When Sinbad tries to prove his claims that the jewels are a mermaid's gift, and the mermaid does not appear, the king orders him drowned. The mermaid saves Sinbad, and he persuades her to show herself to the king. The king promises to protect the mermaids from human persecution, and after being given the jewels as a gift, he appoints Judel and Saleem as ministers at his court.
13	""Flying Wooden Horse""; Transliteration: "Soratobu mokuba" (Japanese: 空飛ぶ木馬)	December 24, 1975
While Baghdad is celebrating the arrival of spring, an old sorcerer named Balba offers the king a flying wooden horse, in return for the hand of Princess Sharam. Sinbad seizes the wooden horse with a trick, thus absolving the king from his obligation, but as he returns to the palace and shows the horse to the princess, Balba kidnaps the girl and flies off with her. While following them on land, Sinbad follows a band of raiders to an oasis, where Sharam is kept as a slave by Balba. The raiders rob Balba of everything, including Sharam and the flying horse, but Sinbad trails them to their hideout, and with Shera's help he persuades the princess to act as if she had gone insane. Posing as a doctor, Sinbad manages to rescue Sharam with the flying horse. Note: This episode is based on the tale of "The Ebony Horse".
14	""Treasure of the Great Devil""; Transliteration: "Dai maō no takara" (Japanese: 大魔王の宝)	January 7, 1976
While Hassan is selling water in the streets of Baghdad, a stranger named Satajit approaches him, claiming to be his long-lost uncle. Promising him riches to help his family, Satajit takes Hassan and Sinbad to a mountain in the desert, where he uses magic to opan a passage into a large cave containing the treasures of the Great Demon King. Equipped with a magic ring by Satajit, Hassan is sent inside to fetch a lamp, but the boy cannot resist taking one of the jewels, causing the cave entrance to close. As Satajit abandons them, Sinbad rushed inside to save Hassan. The ring turns out to be the vessel for a genie, who rescues the boys, allowing them to return to Baghdad. Note: This episode is based on the tale of Aladdin.
15	""Princess of Shahred""; Transliteration: "Sharedo no ohimesama" (Japanese: シャレドのお姫さま)	January 14, 1976
While returning to Baghdad, Sinbad, Shera and Hassan discover that the lamp contains a powerful genie. The next morning, they meet a group of men travelling to the city of Shahred for a festival, and Sinbad's group joins them. When Princess Estella joins the festivities, Sinbad is instantly lovestruck. Hassan causes an accident which amuses the princess, for the first time since her mother died recently. Upon meeting her father, Sinbad asks to spend time with Estella, but the king agrees only in return for a substantially valuable gift of jewels and a castle. Sinbad uses the genie to make the impossible come true, thus finally winning the king's approval. Note: This episode is based on the tale of Aladdin.
16	""The Moroccan Lamp-Seller""; Transliteration: "Morokko no ranpu uri" (Japanese: モロッコのランプ売り)	January 21, 1976
Satajit learns where the genie lamp is now and, posing as a lamp-seller, tricks Princess Estella into giving it to him while Sinbad and Hassan are away. Satajit orders the genie to bring the princess and the castle to Morocco, but Sinbad uses the ring's genie to follow them. In Africa, Shera scouts the palace, sees Satajit with his brother Balba, and learns that she is a princess and that Satajit was responsible for turning her and her parents into birds when she was a baby. As Sinbad sneaks into the palace, Balba betrays Satajit to take the lamp for himself. When Sinbad interrupts them, the two magicians attack him with magic; but Sinbad reflects the spells with a magic mirror, turning his enemies into fire which burns the palace down. After returning to Shahred with the ring genie's help, Sinbad gifts the ring to Estella and departs, promising to return. Note: This episode is based on the tale of Aladdin.
17	""Solomon's Seal""; Transliteration: "Soromon no fūin" (Japanese: ソロモンの封印)	January 28, 1976
One day, Sinbad travels through the desert, but is caught in a sandstorm. He is found and taken in by a poor widow from the city of Tessa, and to repay her, Sinbad uses her late husband's nets to go fishing. He catches a sealed jar and opens it, releasing a Smoke Genie who was imprisoned by the Blue Demon King for having helped humans. The genie prepares to kill Sinbad, but the boy outwits him by demonstrating how he would fit into the jar; once the genie is inside, Sinbad reseals the vessel. Pleading for his freedom, the genie promises to show him the way to treasure, and once released, he directs Sinbad to a lake amongst four hills, where he is to catch four fishes, each in a different color, and bring them to the local king. For helping humans again, the curse of the Demon King sinks the Smoke Genie back into the sea. Note: This episode is based on the story "The Fisherman and the Jinni" and its substory "The Ensorcelled Prince".
18	""Skeleton Corps""; Transliteration: "Gaikotsu no gundan" (Japanese: ガイコツの軍団)	February 4, 1976
Sinbad brings the fishes to the king of Tessa, but when he describes the place where he caught them, the king tells him that the area of the four hills was once ruled by his younger brother Mahmud until he and his realm disappeared thirty years ago. Sinbad leads the king and an expeditionary force to the lake, where they witness a strange light and a crying voice coming from the top of a nearby mountain. Investigating these phenomenons, Sinbad and Shera reach a palace and meet King Mahmud, who along with this realm was cursed by Sugaru, his former wife and an evil sorceress, after her shadow revealed her true identity. Resolving to free King Mahmud, Sinbad and Shera set out to steal Sugaru's comb, the source of her powers. After obtaining it, Sinbad forces Sugaru to reverse her curse, returning King Mahmud and his realm back to their former selves. When Sugaru subsequently attacks him, Sinbad throws the comb into a fire, driving Sugaru away. Note: This episode is based on the story "The Fisherman and the Jinni" and its substory "The Ensorcelled Prince".
19	""Ali Baba the Wandering Boy""; Transliteration: "Hōrō-ji aribaba" (Japanese: 放浪児アリババ)	February 11, 1976
While Sinbad and Shera are travelling through the desert, they are hit by a sudden sandstorm. Afterwards, Sinbad encounters a young desert bandit named Ali Baba, who takes him to his band's camp and introduces him to his leader, Boske. Boske assigns Ali Baba to scout the entourage of the king of Bassa, who is on his way to Baghdad, in preparation for a major raid. Ali Baba, Sinbad and Shera head for the oasis where the king has made camp, and they are taken in as their guests. Sinbad convinces Ali Baba to switch sides, warns the king and sets a trap for the raiders. All the raiders except for Boske are arrested, and Ali Baba accompanies Sinbad on his journeys.
20	""The All-Woman Kingdom""; Transliteration: "On'na bakari no ōkoku" (Japanese: 女ばかりの王国)	February 18, 1976
While Sinbad, Shera and Ali Baba travel through a jungle, they are captured by female warriors. They learn that they have stumbled upon a kingdom inhabited and ruled by women only. Seeing that they are riding bareback, Ali Baba issues a challenge that he is a better rider, and fashions a saddle to help him. Impressed, the queen initiates the introduction of saddles in her realm, and decrees that Ali Baba is to wed her daughter Mana immediately; when he refuses, the queen orders him to be put into a tomb where all the men who came to this kingdom are interred to die. Princess Mana, who has fallen in love with Ali Baba, helps Sinbad into the tomb. After fighting a giant octopus, Sinbad's group escapes through an accessway to the sea, where Mana provides them with a boat. Note: This episode is based on Sinbad the Sailor's Fourth Voyage.
21	""Giant Bird Child Rockle""; Transliteration: "Ōdori no ko rokkuru" (Japanese: 巨鳥の子ロックル)	February 25, 1976
Sinbad's boat runs into a storm; he and Shera are separated from Ali Baba, but are picked up by a merchant ship. In the cargo hold, they discover the egg of a roc which the merchant mistakenly believes to be a giant gemstone. When the chick hatches, Sinbad names it Rockle and begins taking care of it, but the chick's parents, who have been looking for their egg, attack the ship and carry it off, with Sinbad and Shera on board, to an island. After Rockle leaves with its parents, Sinbad is captured by hostile natives who prepare to sacrifice him to a saurial monster. Just in the nick of time, Rockle rescues Sinbad and carries him to a desert oasis.
22	""Great Monkey's Gratitude""; Transliteration: "Dai saru no ongaeshi" (Japanese: 大猿の恩返し)	March 3, 1976
After catching a ship taking him home, Sinbad reaches a city where he meets an old man and his wife in debt with a greedy merchant, whom they pay with coconuts. After offering to assist them, Sinbad is taught to collect the coconuts by throwing stones at the monkey sitting in the coconut trees, who in turn throw the nuts at them. To speed the harvest, Sinbad constructs a rapid-fire catapult, but one of the stones falls into a nearby lake, stirring a giant two-headed snake living in it. The snake attacks the monkeys, prompting Sinbad to help; in the end, the snake ends up devouring one of its own heads, killing itself. Consequently, the grateful monkeys grant them enough coconuts to pay off the old man's debt in full. Note: This episode is based on the tale of Sinbad the Sailor's Fifth Voyage.
23	""Nile River Urchin""; Transliteration: "Nairu no kawa bōzu" (Japanese: ナイルの河ぼうず)	March 10, 1976
Sinbad and Shera reach the shores of the Nile, where he meets an old ferryman named Aladdin, who was once a famous king thanks to a magic lamp until he lost all in a war against his realm. A genie has recently settled in the river and is challenging anyone wanting to cross it with a riddle; if not, he sinks the boats carrying them. While trying to find a way to cross, Sinbad is challenged by the genie, but succeeds in answering his riddles. Defeated, the genie departs, allowing ferrying traffic to resume, and Aladdin joins Sinbad and Shera in their adventures.
24	""Living Mammoth""; Transliteration: "Ikiteita manmosu" (Japanese: 生きていたマンモス)	March 17, 1976
Sinbad, Shera and Aladdin are swept by a river of flowing sand into a subterranean realm, where they surprisingly discover a tribe of neanderthals co-existing with mammoths. After Sinbad and Aladdin prove their sincerity by driving off giant vampire bats attacking the tribe, their elder tells them that they are threatened by ivory hunters, against whose more advanced weapons the neanderthals are helpless. Sinbad gets the idea of using the mammoths as living tanks, and the invaders are driven off. The neanderthals and mammoths decide to look for a new home on the surface, and Sinbad, Aladdin and Shera continue their journey.
25	""Jian, the Giant's Son""; Transliteration: "Kyojin no musuko jaian" (Japanese: 巨人の息子ジャイアン)	March 24, 1976
While taking a shortcut through a mountain gorge, Sinbad's troupe unexpectedly runs into Ali Baba, who just fought a giant and stuck his knife into its foot. Returning to the spot where Ali Baba encountered it, they discover that the giant in question is only a child, and remove the knife from its foot. Soon after, they encounter the giant child's father, who prepares to eat them, but the child intervenes, convincing his father to stop attacking them, and after getting helped on their way, Sinbad and his friends reach the coast and resume their journey to Baghdad.
26	""Big Whale That Carries a Glacier""; Transliteration: "Hyōzan o hakobu dai kujira" (Japanese: 氷山を運ぶ大鯨)	March 31, 1976
As they arrive at Baghdad, Sinbad and his friends discover that a major drought has dried up the city's water sources. Aladdin remembers a story where another city was saved from a drought when an iceberg drifted to its coast. Sinbad asks the Mermaid Princess to summon the island whale so he can help ferry an iceberg to Baghdad. After a rough trip to the southern polar waters, and with the help of a whole school of whales, they manage to break off a large enough iceberg and bring it back home, where the evaporating ice triggers a rainstorm which replenishes the city's rivers.
27	""The Robbers of Baghdad""; Transliteration: "Bagudaddo no tōzoku" (Japanese: バグダッドの盗賊)	April 7, 1976
Just as Sinbad and his friends are celebrating the success of their latest adventure, a gang of forty robbers ravages and plunders Baghdad, including Sinbad's house. Sinbad and his friends roam the city looking for clues. The next night, Ali Baba is mistakenly arrested, breaks out of his cell and flees the city, making him a wanted man. Sinbad's servant Tabat chances upon a few of the robbers, giving Sinbad, Shera and Ali Baba a trail to follow. The hoofprints end at the foot of a cliff. The robbers then arrive and use a passphrase to open a secret gate into the rock, but because they couldn't hear it clearly enough, Sinbad and Ali Baba begin fumbling through a number of possible passphrases. Note: This episode is based on Ali Baba and the Forty Thieves.
28	""Open Sesame""; Transliteration: "Hirake goma" (Japanese: ひらけごま)	April 14, 1976
After a whole night of futile attempts, Sinbad finally opens the secret gate to the robbers' hideout. Finding a heap of treasure inside, Sinbad decides to cart it back to his house to lure the bandits into a trap. Hassan's boss, from whom they have rented the carts, becomes suspicious and puts some glue into a box which Ali Baba uses to count the coins in the loot. When Ali Baba returns the box, with a gold piece stuck inside, the thieves, who have since noticed their loss, witness the exchange and force Hassan's boss to tell them everything. After they are thrown off by a ruse, their leader disguises himself as a merchant and brings forty large jars, with his men inside, onto Sinbad's grounds. Shera finds out, and Sinbad, Ali Baba and Tabat incapacitate the thieves by pouring strong alcohol into their jars. The thieves are arrested and the loot returned, but the leader escapes. Note: This episode is based on Ali Baba and the Forty Thieves.
29	""Flying Jutan""; Transliteration: "Soratobu jūtan" (Japanese: 空飛ぶジュータン)	April 21, 1976
After Sinbad and his friends have distributed the Forty Thieves' plunder, all that is left is a carpet. Sinbad discovers that this is a flying carpet and takes it on a test ride, thus catching the interest of a witch named Tabasa, who has been looking for it. She quickly rejoins her sons Satajit and Balba. In return for her magical power he had stripped from her, Balba sends Tabasa back to retrieve the carpet. Disguising herself as a beautiful girl, she gets near her target until a mouse exposes her; she then kidnaps Shera and the carpet. While pursuing her, Sinbad and Ali Baba come across the flying horse Tabasa used to get to the city, and ride it back to the magicians' hideout. The resulting conflict destroys the cave and culminates in an aerial battle, which ends with Sinbad and Aladdin reclaiming Shera and the carpet and losing their pursuers. After gifting the carpet to the city, Sinbad and his friends resume their travels.
30	""Dwarf Pirates""; Transliteration: "Kobito no kaizoku-tachi" (Japanese: 小人の海賊たち)	April 28, 1976
When Sinbad's ship is caught in a storm, the captain, who plans to steal their wares, has him and his companions marooned on a raft, just before lightning sinks the ship. The four friends are washed up on an island inhabited by tiny people, who enslave them, using Shera as hostage to ensure their compliance. Sinbad befriends King Boaru's daughter Jamaru, but Ali Baba runs away, only to be captured by another tribe of tiny people from the mountains, who are at war with the sea people. Note: This episode uses elements from the Lilliput chapter of Gulliver's Travels.
31	""War on Dwarf Island""; Transliteration: "Kobitojima no dai sensō" (Japanese: 小人島の大戦争)	May 5, 1976
In his new captivity, Ali Baba befriends Hasha, the prince of the mountain people. Meanwhile, Sinbad learns from Princess Jamaru that she and Hasha are in love and are against the looming war between the two tribes. Establishing communication with Ali Baba, Sinbad thinks up a plan to end the hostilities. While the Sea Tribe besieges the Mountain Tribe, they unite the two lovers and get their fathers to finally see reason. With the war ended and the two lovers married, Sinbad and his friends say farewell and head for home. Note: This episode uses elements from the Lilliput chapter of Gulliver's Travels.
32	""Shera's Secret""; Transliteration: "Shēra no himitsu" (Japanese: シェーラの秘密)	May 12, 1976
Sinbad's group is attacked by a group of strange men wearing bird-like helmets, and Ali Baba and Aladdin are captured. Sinbad and Shera follow them to a ruined city, where they learn from its only inhabitant, an old blind man, that this was the capital of a prosperous kingdom until an evil sorcerer cursed it, turning most of its inhabitants - including the royal princess Shera - into birds. Realizing that this is her home, Shera speaks to a statue of her transformed parents; Sinbad overhears her, thus learning her secret, and promises to see the curse on her and her parents dispelled. Infiltrating the tower used by the helmeted men as their base, Sinbad and Shera free their friends, but are attacked by the men, who can turn themselves into vultures. Then two white eagles - Shera's parents - appear and drive the aggressors off, then leave without giving Shera the chance to speak with them. Note: The bird-people plot element was likely inspired by Sinbad the Sailor's Seventh Voyage.
33	""The Great Ice Demon""; Transliteration: "Kōri no dai majin" (Japanese: 氷の大魔人)	May 19, 1976
Having run out of water, Sinbad's troupe reaches an area where all wells have dried up and a villainous water seller is keeping the locals under his heel, seizing their children if they can't pay his price. As they investigate, Sinbad and his friends discover that the water seller has an inexhaustible water supply, the result of a deal with an Ice Genie in exchange for the seized children to add to his frozen "collection". Sinbad is offered to the genie, but his friends mobilize the villagers and defeat the genie with fire. Consequently, the water the Ice Genie has withheld on the water seller's command is restored.
34	""Moa, the Man-Eating Bird""; Transliteration: "Hito kui tori moa" (Japanese: 人喰い鳥モア)	May 26, 1976
While making a stop at an island to take on provisions, Sinbad's group encounter a ship captain who uses a large egg, property of the local god, to get the natives load his vessel with ebony timber. While looking for the source of the wood, they meet the island's "god", a huge flightless bird, after inadvertently disturning its nest. On their way back, Ali Baba impulsively grabs one of the bird's chicks, thus sending the entire Moa population after them. Using a trick, Sinbad and his friends tame the birds, winning the natives' admiration and thus getting their ship loaded with timber and provisions.
35	""Mammoth-Boy Poco""; Transliteration: "Manmosu shōnen poko" (Japanese: マンモス少年ポコ)	June 2, 1976
Sinbad and his friends re-encounter the neanderthals and the mammoths, who have settled in a jungle in Africa. When a young mammoth named Bumbo is injured by an irate rhinoceros, Sinbad's troupe takes him and his human brother Poco to an Egyptian pyramid which is said to be able to cure any ailment. After many hazards, most notoriously a pair of black panthers, they make it to the Nile, where they meet a group of scholars who accompany them to the pyramid.
36	""Thief of the Pyramids""; Transliteration: "Piramiddo no dai dorobō" (Japanese: ピラミッドの大泥棒)	June 9, 1976
After arriving at the pyramid, Sinbad, Aladdin, Poco and Shera find a way inside. Meanwhile, Ali Baba discovers that the "scholars" are really tomb robbers, led by the former leader of the Forty Thieves; he is captured and forced to lead them into the pyramid. Sinbad and the others arrive in the central burial chamber of the pyramid, where Bumbo is healed. The looters make their way inside as well. Their intrusion triggers a deadly magical trap, but Sinbad succeeds just in time to get everyone out. The robbers reluctantly give up on the pyramid's treasure, and Sinbad's company returns to the jungle.
37	""Land of Illusion""; Transliteration: "Ma boroshi no kuni" (Japanese: まぼろしの国)	June 16, 1976
Sinbad and his friends reach a city on which a curfew is imposed because the crown of King Muhammad has been stolen. Aladdin identifies the city and its country as the realm he once ruled until Muhammad conquered it over ten years ago, although he is still fondly remembered by the people. Sinbad and his friends pose as soothsayers to lure the true thief out. To everyone's surprise, it is Kasran, Mohammed's own son who is critical of his father's harsh regime. While Muhammad prepares to execute his son, a servant girl appears with the broken crown; the girl confesses to Sinbad's group that she accidentally damaged the crown and Kasran hid it to take the blame. Aladdin reveals himself to Muhammad, and by letting him find the broken crown in a mosque, he claims that Allah is displeased with his selfishness and will punish him if he does not change his ways. After the resolution of this problem, Aladdin and his friend leave the city with the people cheering their old king.
38	""Magic Dragon""; Transliteration: "Mahō no ryū" (Japanese: 魔法の竜)	June 23, 1976
As they stroll through a town, Sinbad, Ali Baba and Aladdin are addressed by an old snake charmer with a magic orb who asks them to look for his missing twin brother. Agreeing to help, they find the brother, who claims he was bitten by a snake and needs a certain herb to be cured. As they collect that herb, the old man suddenly traps them in a pit. He reveals himself as Satajit, the evil sorcerer whom Sinbad has crossed so many times, and turns a snake into a dragon with the orb to kill them. Sinbad and his friends discover that the dragon fears the herb they have collected, and use the herbs and Ali Bab's rope to make it carry them out of the pit. Sinbad attacks Satajit, trapping him in the pit and breaking his orb, which causes the dragon to turn back into a snake.
39	""Burning Oasis""; Transliteration: "Moeru oashisu" (Japanese: 燃えるオアシス)	June 30, 1976
Sinbad and his friend arrive at an oasis with a village, only to find the water gone and the settlement abandoned. When Sinbad and Ali Baba try digging for water, they discover a crude oil deposit instead. Ali Baba stubbornly keeps digging, thereby inadvertendly freeing an Oil Genie who admits that he was the one drying up the oasis in order to sleep undisturbed, and threatens to turn them into coal if they do not correct the situation. Sinbad sets the oil on fire to surprise the Genie into releasing Ali Baba, but the enraged Genie traps them. The heat from the burning oil creates a sandstorm which extinguishes the flames and buries the Genie. With his power broken, the water returns to the oasis.
40	""The Girl from the Stars""; Transliteration: "Hoshi no kuni kara kita shōjo" (Japanese: 星の国から来た少女)	July 7, 1976
As they are nearing Baghdad, Sinbad and his friends see a shooting star falling from the sky and find a strange girl in the impact crater. After taking her with them, the girl by the name of Cindy confirms herself as a being from the stars, who was cast out because she was jealous of her baby brother. To teach her responsibility as a sister, Ali Baba takes her to Hassan, whom she befriends, and his three little brothers. Tabasa however becomes aware of Cindy, kidnaps her and - accidentally - Hassan's brothers, and feeds them a potion to subjugate them. She has Cindy bring a pot with a rope transformed into a snake to Sinbad, but as the snake attacks, it turns back into a rope because Earthly magic does not work in Cindy's presence. Sinbad, Ali Baba and Cindy go back Tabasa's hideout, and Cindy breaks the charm on Hassan's brothers. With her change of heart about being an older sister now, Cindy is taken back home the next night.
41	""The Ship-Eating Monster Fish""; Transliteration: "Fune o nomu dai kai sakana" (Japanese: 船をのむ大怪魚)	July 14, 1976
Sinbad, Shera, Ali Baba and Aladdin hurry to catch a ship going south, but they are imprisoned by the crew, who are slavers. As Sinbad and his friends try to escape, a monstrous fish suddenly appears and devours the ship. Barely escaping with their lives, Sinbad's group meets the Mermaid Princess, who takes them to an island where her people have taken refuge from the monster fish. Sinbad devises a plan to lure the fish into a shallow bay and beach it there. The plan succeeds, and after using the monster's carcass to build a boat, Sinbad and his friends bid farewell to the mermaids and depart.
42	""Grampa Aladdin's Country""; Transliteration: "Arajin jīsan no kuni" (Japanese: アラジンじいさんの国)	July 21, 1976
While Sinbad's group takes a rest in an oasis, a palace suddenly appears in front of them and they are welcomed by Princess Manart and her family. Ali Baba and Manart fall in love, but the friends learn that the palace is cursed to vanish at the next dawn for another hundred years after its inhabitants were presumptious enough to ask Allah for immortality. Ali Baba decides to stay, but Manart cheats him out of their future together because she has realized that he belongs with his friends. The palace vanishes at sunrise, leaving Ali Baba heartbroken. Note: This episode uses the legend of Brigadoon as its setting's template.
43	""Run, Ali Baba!""; Transliteration: "Hashire! Aribaba" (Japanese: 走れ！アリババ)	July 28, 1976
Sinbad's group is captured by the soldiers of an African kingdom as spies. A hundred years ago, the Arabs attacked them and took many of them as slaves; as a consequence, the king intends to execute them and attack Baghdad. Sinbad pleads for mercy by promising that the king of Baghdad will guarantee peace between their people; Ali Baba is sent to fetch the letter within the next ten days while Sinbad and Ali Baba remain as hostages. Ali Baba and Shera encounter many obstacles on the way, but with the help of the River Genie, a band of robbers who know Ali Baba, Rockle, Jian and his father, they accomplish their mission. Impressed by their sincerity, the king releases his captives and gives them diamonds as a gift for Baghdad's king.
44	""The Ghost Ship of the Desert""; Transliteration: "Sabaku no yūreibune" (Japanese: 砂漠の幽霊船)	August 4, 1976
In a small town, Sinbad and his friends find a hookah which once belonged to Sinbad's uncle Ali. The salesman claims that he picked it up on a haunted ship in the middle of the desert. Sinbad and the others journey to the ship, which Sinbad identifies as Ali's. Then Satajit appears, stating that he was the one who raised the ship from the sea in order to lure Sinbad to his doom, and that Ali was taken by the Blue Demon King and turned to stone. Then Satajit summons warriors made of sand, but Aladdin deprives him of his crystal orb, giving Sinbad the chance to use it and order the sandmen to attack Satajit. The sorcerer retreats, and the ship sinks beneath the sands, but this adventure makes Sinbad determined to save his loved ones from the Demon King.
45	""The Talking Statue""; Transliteration: "Monoiu sekizō" (Japanese: ものいう石像)	August 11, 1976
Sinbad's group stumbles upon a ruined city, and then are puzzled to see a group of people leaving offerings to a headless statue of a winged horse. They follow their trail to a village whose inhabitants live in fear of a creature they call The Great God. When something attacks the village, Sinbad and his friends return to the ruins, to find the statue alive. Then they follow a voice to a buried talking stone head which asks them to reattach it to its body, but as soon as it is done, the restored stone creature reveals itself as a demon who was beheaded by the Demon King and challenges them to ride its back in return for their lives. All three fail, but then a thunderstorm strikes. Sinbad asks Ali Baba to attach his dagger to the stone demon, and a lightning bolt, attracted by the steel, hits the demon, obliterating it.
46	""Ali Baba the Magician""; Transliteration: "Mahōtsukai aribaba" (Japanese: 魔法使いアリババ)	August 18, 1976
Ali Baba has fallen ill, but the next town Sinbad and his friends arrive at admits only a very limited number of travelers each day because of its king's paranoia. A beautiful girl, who is really Tabasa in disguise, lures Ali Baba into the town, charms him and gives him magical powers, but Shera witnesses this and informs her friends. Sinbad persuades the guards into letting him and Aladdin in, but as they accuse Tabasa, they learn that she is in the king's favor and are arrested. Shera frees them, but then they encounter Tabasa and Ali Baba, who force them to flee. Afterwards, Tabasa makes her move to take over the realm, but Sinbad and Aladdin defeat Tabasa with a mouse they've obtained from a trader, breaking her spell and making her run. As they take their leave, they also encourage the king to open the city for free commerce.
47	""Secret of the Tower of Babel""; Transliteration: "Baberunotō no nazo" (Japanese: バベルの塔の謎)	August 25, 1976
Just before Sindbad's return to Baghdad, Shera is kidnapped by Tabasa and Balba. As they pursue, Sinbad, Ali Baba and Aladdin suddenly discover a colossal tower reaching into the sky, the hideout of Tabasa, Balba and Satajit, who are eager to finalize their revenge on Sinbad. When Sinbad and his friends enter the tower, they are attacked by paper warriors summoned by Balba. Sinbad eludes capture, discovers the warriors' weakness and frees his friends before they are killed. They also free Shera, but are forced to retreat to the tower's top. Just then, the white eagles come to their rescue again, and a lightning blast destroys the tower. Surviving the collapse, Sinbad and his friends confront the sorcerers once again and force Satajit to rescind the curse of Shera, while he himself is turned into a turkey. While Shera becomes human again, her parents do not, but Sinbad and the others vow to find a way to free them as well.
48	""100 Magicians""; Transliteration: "100-Ri no mahōtsukai" (Japanese: 100人の魔法使い)	September 1, 1976
Sinbad and his friends take Shera to Baghdad, where she is taken in by the king and his family until her parents are restored. In a ruined arena, Tabasa and Balba call for a conclave of all evil magicians in the land to finish Sinbad and appease their patron, the Blue Demon King. Three of them, the Miluchi Brothers, volunteer for the task to kidnap Shera and thus lure Sinbad and his friends to them. For this purpose, the Miluchis adopt the appearances of Sinbad, Aladdin and Ali Baba, but they abduct Princess Sharam by mistake. Implicated in the crime, Sinbad and his friends set out to rescue the princess and clear their names.
49	""Princess Shera in Peril""; Transliteration: "Shēra hime no kiki" (Japanese: シェーラ姫の危機)	September 8, 1976
At the sorcerers' hideout, the Miluchis' mistake is realized, and when they notice Sinbad's troupe trailing them, Tabasa kidnaps Shera. Sinbad and the others reach the arena, where the disguised Miluchi Brother engage them. After breaking away, Sinbad devises a plan to trick the evil magicians by making his group pretend to be the Miluchis, causing Tabasa to petrify their evil doppelgängers. When they are found out, Sinbad topples a powerful magical stone. Its destruction triggers an earthquake which collapses the arena, killing all the magicians, but Sinbad, Ali Baba, Aladdin, Shera and Sharam escape. Knowing that their patron, the Blue Demon King, is still at large, Sinbad vows to find and defeat him next.
50	""The Blue Demon King""; Transliteration: "Aoi dai maō" (Japanese: 青い大魔王)	September 15, 1976
Enraged at Sinbad's triumph, the Blue Demon King summons his last remaining servant, Sugaru, and tasks her to command the genies to destroy Sinbad in his name. Sugaru issues a challenge to Sinbad, whereupon he, Shera, Ali Baba and Aladdin leave Baghdad to confront her and her master. Sugaru summons the Genies of Smoke, Fire, Desert, Rock, Oil and Ice, and first sends out the Smoke Genie against Sinbad. Warned by the Mermaid Princess, Sinbad tricks the Smoke Genie into revealing where the Blue Demon King's castle is, whereupon he is once again punished for his betrayal. Upon Sinbad's suggestion, the Mermaid Princess declares to help by summoning their monster friends to their aid against the other Genies.
51	""War of the Genies""; Transliteration: "Majin dai sensō" (Japanese: 魔神大戦争)	September 22, 1976
As Sinbad and his friends travel on, Sugaru sends the Genies of Fire, Ice and Oil to kill Sinbad, but the Genies of Fire and Ice fight over this privilege, destroying each other, and the Oil Genie is drenched in salt water by the island whale and petrified. Next, the Desert and Rock Genies close in on them, but Rockle, Jian and his father arrive and defeat them. Joined by them, Sinbad's group continues on their way to the Demon king's castle.
52	""Undo the Magic!""; Transliteration: "Mahō yo tokero" (Japanese: 魔法よとけろ)	September 29, 1976
Worried about Sinbad, Hassan travels to the Blue Demon King's treasure cave to get the genie lamp. Sugaru arrives there first and claims it, but because the Lamp Genie respects Sinbad, Sugaru discards the lamp and instead takes a magic mirror which petrifies all who look into it. With this, she disables most of Sinbad's friends, but Sinbad, Shera and Hassan, brought to his friend by the Lamp Genie, wrest the mirror from her and use it to turn her to stone. The Blue Demon King attacks, but accidentally stabs his own reflection in the mirror and is petrified as well. With his death, the curses he put on his victims are broken; Sinbad is happily reunited with his parents and Uncle Ali, and Shera beholds her parents turning back into their human selves. After their triumphant return to Baghdad and a brief rest, Sinbad, Ali Baba and Aladdin set out again for new adventures.

== Music ==
English	Japanese	Position	Singer
Sinbad's Adventures	Shindobatto no Bōken	Japanese Opening	Mitsuko Horie
Sinbad's Song	Shindobatto no Uta	Japanese Ending	Mitsuko Horie

The first volume of the original soundtrack for the anime was released on CD on December 22, 2023. The score was composed by renowned musician Shunsuke Kikuchi, known for his work on numerous iconic anime series. The CD was released by Fuji Animation.

== Alternative titles ==
- Sindbad Jahaji (Indian)
- アラビアンナイト シンドバットの冒険 (Japanese)
- Los viajes de Simbad (Spanish)
- As viagens de Sinbad (Portuguese)
- Przygody Sindbada (Polish)
- Shirab, il ragazzo di Bagdad (Italian)
- Sinbad de Zeeman (Dutch)
- Sinbad die Seeman (Afrikaans)
- Sinbad le marin (French)
- Sømanden Sinbad (Danish)
- 아라비안 나이트 신밧드의 모험 (South Korean)
- Sindbad (German)
- The Arabian Nights: Adventures of Sinbad (English)
- مغامرات سندباد (Arabic)
- ماجراهای سندباد (Persian)
- Sinbad (Turkish)
- Sindbad Jahazi (Indian)
- Σεβάχ ο θαλασσινός (Greek)
- Sindbad marinarul (Romanian)
- Синдбад Моряка (Bulgarian)

== See also ==
- One Thousand and One Nights
