= Elissar Naddaf =

Lebanese media executive (born 1971)

Chairwoman and Director-General of Télé Liban
- Incumbent
- Assumed office 22 August 2025

Personal details
- Born: 7 September 1971 (age 54) Zahle, Lebanon
- Children: 4
- Education: Holy Spirit University of Kaslik (Ph.D. in Contemporary French Literature) & Lebanese University (BA in journalism with a specialization in news agencies)

Elissar Naddaf (Arabic: اليسار ندّاف) born on September 7, 1971, is a Lebanese media executive. She is the chairwoman of the board of directors and director-general of Télé Liban, the Lebanese national public broadcaster. Her appointment by the Council of Ministers ended decades of neglect and vacancy. The appointment process was praised for its transparency and clarity, favoring competence over corruption, interference, and quotas. Prior to her nomination, Naddaf served as an advisor to the Minister of Information and spearheaded the digitization of the archives, focusing on Francophonie and women.

== Education and academic contributions ==
Elissar received her Ph.D. in French literature from the Holy Spirit University of Kaslik (USEK), graduating summa cum laude. Her thesis entitled "The Ambivalent Role of Ethos in Inter-Christian Reconciliation (1989-2018)" (« Le rôle ambivalent de l'ethos dans la réconciliation interchrétienne (1989-2018) ») won the AUF second prize for the best thesis project presentation in the USEK Doctoral Days.

She also holds from the Lebanese University a Master's degree and DEA (postgraduate diploma) in French literature and language, as well as a double BA in journalism with a specialization in news agencies and in French literature and language.

Naddaf is also the author of the scholarly article Pathos in Rhetorical Diagnosis and Linguistic Suggestion and Its Branches, and has completed multiple international certifications in media archiving, digitization, and production from various organizations.

== Early career ==
Naddaf began her career in 1988 as an editor at La Revue du Liban et de l'Orient Arabe, then joined Radio Liban Libre before moving to the National News Agency (NNA) as a journalist and translator in the French-speaking service of the Foreign Languages Department.

== Ministry of Information ==
In 2011, Minister of Information Walid Daouk appointed her as advisor in charge of the Télé Liban's archives. In 2018, Minister Melhem Riachi appointed her as advisor for Francophone affairs. Magazine Le Mensuel awarded her the title Guardian of Francophonie in Public Media for strengthening French-language broadcasts. She held these positions throughout successive ministerial terms.

== Télé Liban ==
During its session presided over by Lebanese President Joseph Aoun on Friday 11 July 2025, the Lebanese Cabinet appointed Dr. Elissar Naddaf Geagea as Chairwoman of the Board of Directors and Director-General of Télé Liban, the country's national public broadcaster. Dr. Naddaf is the eleventh person to lead the public channel since the merger of the two antennas in 1978, and the first woman to hold this position in Lebanese broadcasting history.

The Cabinet also appointed Board members Janan Wajdi Mallat, Mohammed Nimr, Charles Rizkallah Saba, Ali Ibrahim Qassem and Rima Hani Khaddaj.

According to government sources, the nominated individuals were appointed without objection, with the Cabinet's consensus. The appointment process was praised for its clarity and transparency, favoring competence over issues of corruption, interference, and quotas. After years of an administrative vacuum, this appointment was seen as a step toward reviving the once-iconic institution that served as a cultural and historical mirror for Lebanon.

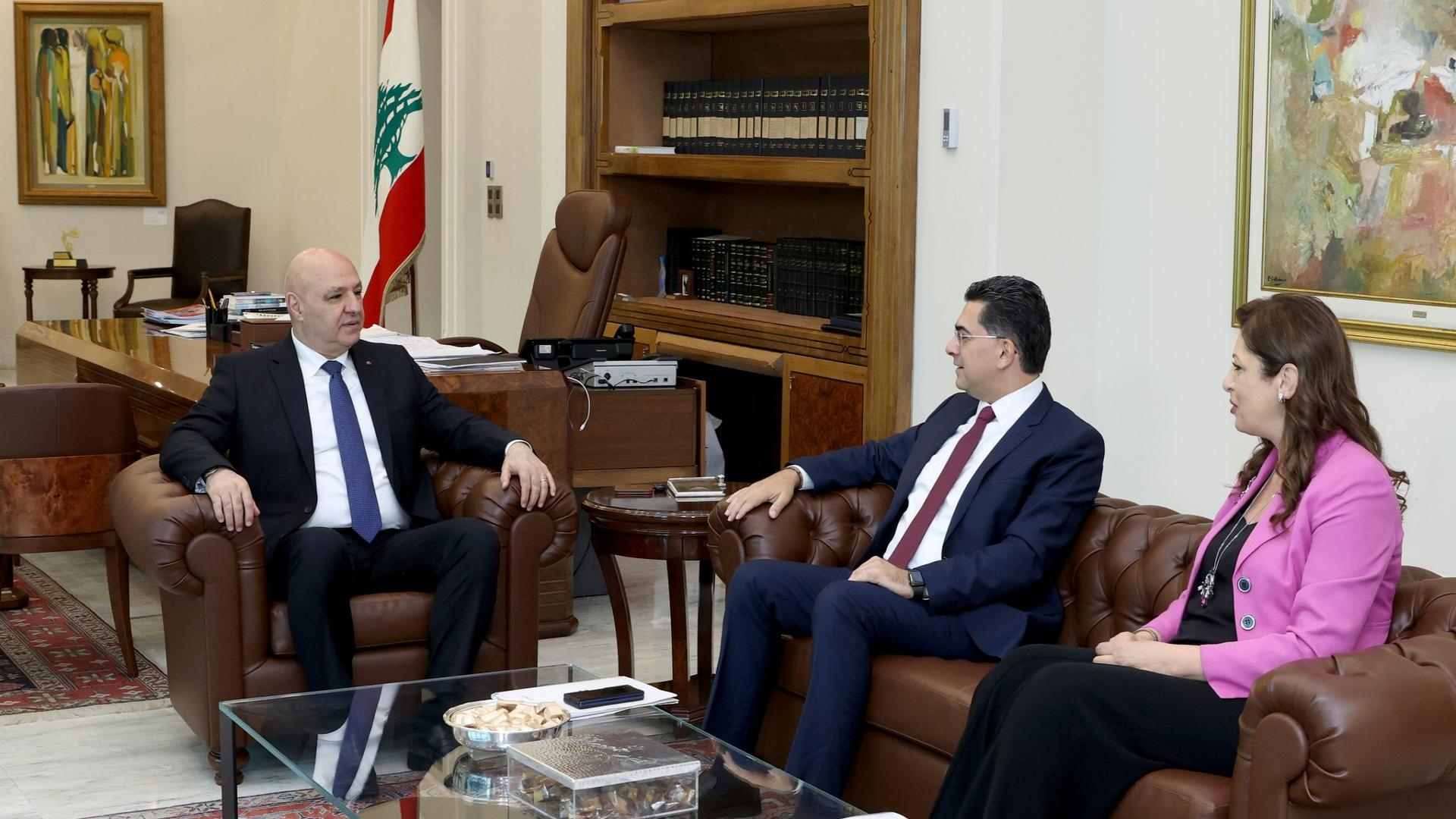
Lebanese President Joseph Aoun reviews Télé Liban's situation with Information Minister Paul Morcos and new Chair and Director-General Elissar Naddaf on 11 August 2025

For more than 26 years, since 1999, Télé Liban has been without a chair of the board, with Ibrahim al-Khoury as the last official position holder. From 2013 to 2025, Télé Liban suffered from institutional stagnation and leadership gaps. Various legal disputes and political delays prevented proper appointments during this period. During this period, a judicial appointment mechanism was adopted, bringing Talal al-Maqdisi in under Minister of Information Walid Daouk. However, he was dismissed by a judicial decision on 26 May 2017, during Minister Melhem Riachi's term. In 2021, during Minister Manal Abdel Samad's tenure, Tawfiq Traboulsi was appointed through the same judicial mechanism, but he resigned for various reasons. The appointment on Friday 11 July 2025 looked like an administrative miracle after years of waiting.

=== Public reception ===
Naddaf was celebrated as the first woman to ever hold this position. "Dr. Elissar Naddaf Geagea's appointment marks a turning point for Lebanon's public broadcasting sector. It is the result of a long-standing commitment driven by a clear ambition for Télé Liban. With her robust academic background, international expertise, and deep institutional knowledge, Naddaf brings a visionary roadmap for Télé Liban's digital transformation and cultural revitalization. However, her success depends not only on her leadership but also on political will, institutional autonomy, and public trust. With adequate support, Télé Liban could become a beacon of national identity, unity, and creative excellence in the rapidly evolving media landscape. This appointment marks two turning points: the feminization of senior public office and a breath of fresh air for national television."

The daily newspaper Nidaa Al Watan wrote, "The choice of Dr. Elisar Naddaf to lead the institution reflects more than just filling a vacancy. It signals a real intention to revive the faded image of Lebanese TV through someone with the knowledge and experience to take on the difficult task of crossing the stage from decline to rise." Another article from the same newspaper adds: "Naddaf, who comes from an academic and media background, represents not only a successful managerial choice but also has the qualifications to effectively rescue the TV from its stumbling block. Her presence at the helm of the organization raises hopes for restructuring public television and strengthening its presence in the Lebanese media landscape."

The Lebanese Press Club congratulated two of its members, Dr. Elissar Naddaf and Rima Khadaj, on their appointments to Télé Liban's board of directors. The Press Club also commended the Council of Ministers for its selections and expressed hope that this marks a new era of revival for Télé Liban, restoring its historic role and highlighting the essential contributions of women in public leadership.

Former Minister of Information Ziad Makary congratulated Naddaf, saying that "three years of working together in the Ministry of Information were enough for me to appreciate your commitment, efficiency, and dedication in everything you do. It was a rich and special experience, and you were always up to the task. I am confident that your footprint will be clear in your new position, and that you will add a lot of your experience and your beautiful spirit to this national media edifice. From the bottom of my heart, I wish you and the new board every success."

Former Minister of Youth and Sports George Kallas said "the appointment of a new board of Directors for Télé Liban, after twenty-six years of neglect and vacuum, is a national achievement for public media." He praised the chairwoman for her competence, experience and distinguished media background.

The Catholic Media Center congratulated the Council of Ministers on approving the appointments at Télé Liban after a long wait, stating that the appointment of Naddaf as chair of the board of directors is an indication of the selection of the most competent and deserving person to take on the responsibility of reviving the television station so that it can resume its leading and pioneering role in the media arena after a long absence. The Catholic Media Center expressed its support for the chair of the board of directors in her new responsibilities, stating the Board will live up to the expectations for free and responsible media that serves the truth and Lebanon without any distortion.

The Samir Kassir Foundation tweeted that Naddaf has been "a staunch ally of meaningful media law reform, built bridges with CSOs & international partners, and shown constant openness to new bold ideas." Naddaf had played an instrumental role in providing Hostile Environment and Emergency First Aid Training for Télé Liban journalists and cameramen in cooperation with Samir Kassir Foundation, and helped with facilitating import of vital Personal Protective Equipment for journalists.
