= Camille Moubarak =

Lebanese political scientist

Monsignor Camille Moubarak
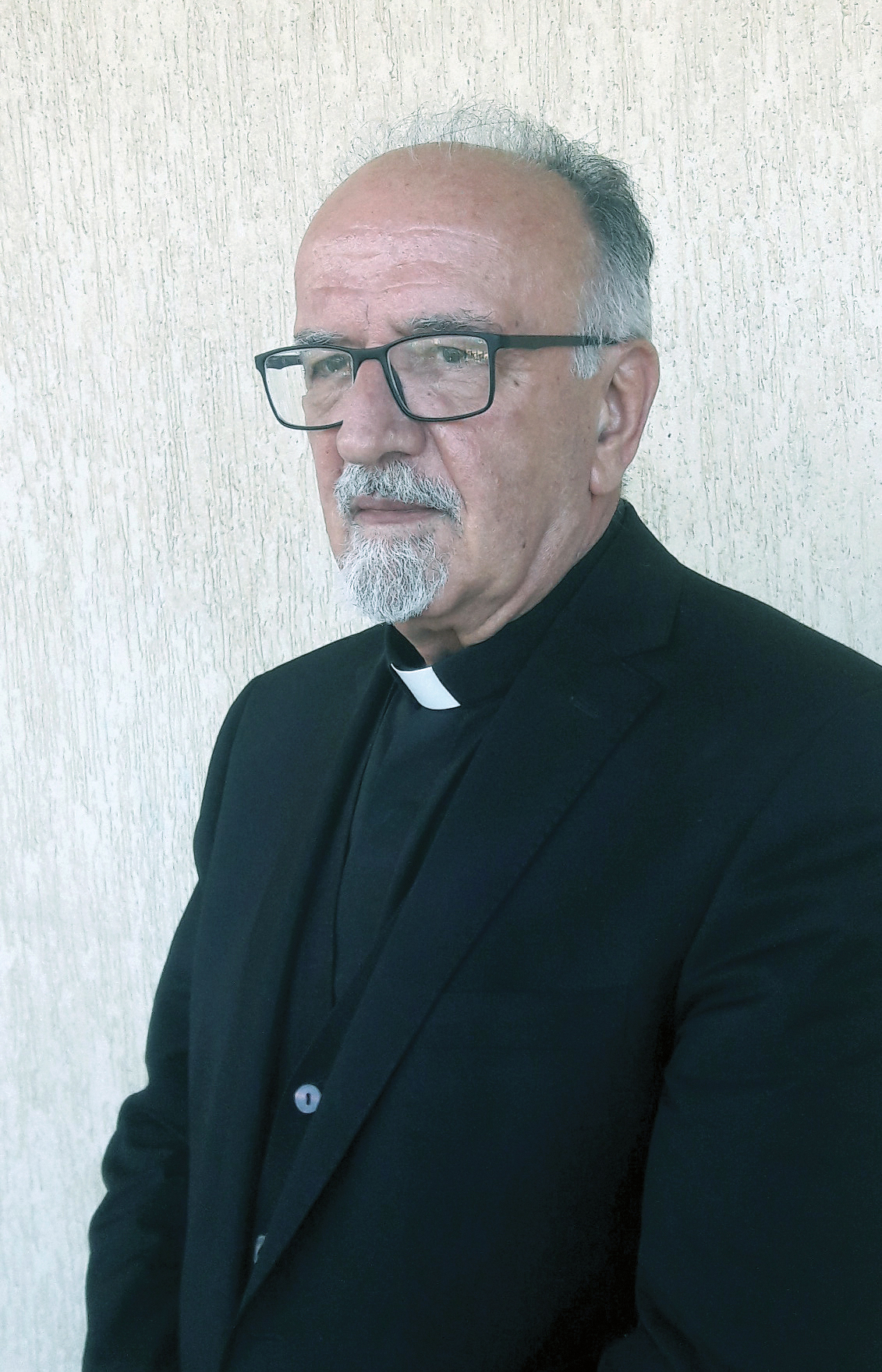
- Born: 15 December 1947 (age 78); Kfarniss, Lebanon

Philosophical work
- Main interests: Social doctrine Conviviality; Reformer; Social Sciences

Monsignor Camille Moubarak (born December 15, 1947, in Kfarnis, Lebanon) is a Lebanese political scientist, academic, poet, writer, and Maronite Priest. His has written and lectured widely on Lebanese politics, peace and democracy.

== Career ==
He became the administrator of La Sagesse School in Beirut from 1987 to 1997, then La Sagesse School of Jdeideh, Metn, from 1997 to 1999. He was the President of Sagesse University between 2011 and 2015, as had served previously as Dean of the Faculty of Political Science and International Relations for 15 years. In 2015 he received the Deanship of the Doctoral Institute at Sagesse University.

He was ordained as a priest on June 9, 1984, and served in a number of Maronite parishes within the archdiocese of Beirut, including Saint Joseph at Ashrafieh, Our Lady at Ain Saadeh, Saint George at Beit Mery, Saint Antony at Jdeideh El Metn and lately Our Lady at Hadath. He was elevated to Chorbishop on October 7, 2012.

In 2022, Archbishop Boulos Abdel Sater of Beirut sent a letter to Monsignor Moubarak, requesting him to stop discussing political matters in the media. This action led to a sharp division within the Christian community in Lebanon, with the majority of citizens, including those not belonging to Christian sects, opposing the Church's decision. The matter also drew criticism from United Nations circles, which expressed concern over the Church's actions against human rights. The Lebanese public and political commentators questioned why Archbishop Boulos Abdel Sater and others were allowed media appearances while Monsignor Moubarak was barred. Some sources speculated whether this media ban was related to the issue of maritime border demarcation between Lebanon and Israel, as Monsignor Moubarak had emphasized Lebanon's rights to certain areas and gas extraction in his interviews. Additionally, these sources wondered if the ban was connected to the arrest of Maronite Bishop Al-Hajj, who had brought large sums of money from the occupied territories to Lebanon.

== Publications ==
In poetry:

- Moubarak, Camille (2000). Disappointment, Al-Hikmat Edition, Beirut.
- Moubarak, Camille (1998). Letters to me from me, Al-Hikmat Edition, Beirut.
- Moubarak, Camille (1996). Travel without Distances, Al-Hikmat Edition, Beirut.
- Moubarak, Camille (1992). When the Wounds Bloom, Al-Hikmat Edition, Beirut.
- Moubarak, Camille (1987). Lanterns that don’t turn off, Al-Hikmat Edition, Beirut.

In Prose:

- Moubarak, Camille (2017). When There Is an Abundance of Sour Grapes - Beirut 2007-2016, Al-Hikmat Edition, Beirut.
- Moubarak, Camille (2015). Fruits of Trials and Tribulations, Volume III, Al-Hikmat Edition, Beirut.
- Moubarak, Camille (2013). Fruits of Trials and Tribulations, Volume II, Al-Hikmat Edition, Beirut.
- Moubarak, Camille (2012). Fruits of Trials and Tribulations, Volume I, Al-Hikmat Edition, Beirut.
- Moubarak, Camille (2010). Truth and Safety to All of You, Al-Hikmat Edition, Beirut.
- Moubarak, Camille (2009). The Cultural Roots of the Lebanese Wars, in collaboration with Dr Jean Boulos, Al-Hikmat Edition, Beirut.
- Moubarak, Camille (2007). Principles of the Social Ecclesial Doctrine, Al-Hikmat Edition, Beirut.
- Moubarak, Camille (2007). I Know What I believe in, Al-Hikmat Edition, Beirut.
- Moubarak, Camille (2005). Reflections of the Holy Week, Al-Hikmat Edition, Beirut.
- Moubarak, Camille (2005). Meditations on the Silence of Words, Al-Hikmat Edition, Beirut.
- Moubarak, Camille (2004). Dialogue without Colors, Al-Hikmat Edition, Beirut.
- Moubarak, Camille (2002). The Problem of Minorities and the Frameworks for Intercultural Coexistence (French), Al-Hikmat Edition, Beirut.
- Moubarak, Camille (2001). Multiculturalism in the Contemporary Political Mind, Al-Hikmat Edition, Beirut.
- Moubarak, Camille (2001). Anthropology and Social Ethics, Al-Hikmat Edition, Beirut.
- Moubarak, Camille (1999). Before the Wheat Spikes are Mature, Al-Hikmat Edition, Beirut.
- Moubarak, Camille (1994). God on the Tongues of Poets, Al-Hikmat Edition, Beirut.
- Moubarak, Camille (1976). The Story of the Lebanese Reality.
