= Radio Lebanon =

Radio Lebanon إذاعة لبنان
- Logo of Radio Lebanon
- Beirut; Lebanon
- Frequencies: FM: 98.1, 98.5, 96.2; AM: 836 kHz

Programming
- Language: Arabic
- Format: News, talk, and music

Ownership
- Owner: Government of Lebanon

History
- First air date: 1934; 92 years ago

Links
- Website: www.radioliban.gov.lb

Radio Lebanon (better known by the official French term Radio Liban or Arabic: إذاعة لبنان, pronounced Iza'at Lubnan) is one of the pioneering and one of the oldest Arab radio stations.

The main programme is in Arabic with a second channel broadcasting in other languages, mainly in French, but with additional programming in English and Armenian. The second channel also rebroadcasts some programming from Radio France Internationale (RFI) French language news programming.

== Programming ==
Radio Liban also broadcasts for 12 hours international programming destined for the Lebanese diaspora and for international listeners. International programming is in Arabic, French, English, Spanish and Portuguese. The station reflects mainly the official line of the Lebanese government and being a non-partisan neutral channel also the views of all mainstream political forces in Lebanon. It also applies a neutral stance on pan-Arab and international affairs.

== History ==
The origins of the station go back to 1933 during the time of the French Mandate in Lebanon. Starting broadcasting in 1934, it was called Radio-East (meaning Radio of the East) run by the private Société Radio-Orient, and was only the second radio station established in the Arab World after the Egyptian radio station based in Cairo. In the early 1940s, the French Mandate authorities relaunched it as Radio-Levant. In 1946, with the coming independence of Lebanon, Radio Orient was renamed Lebanese Radio (name in Arabic الإذاعة اللبنانية pronounced Al Iza'at Al Lubnaniyyah, in French Radio Libanaise) under the auspices of Service de Radiodiffusion de la République Libanaise. The name stayed applicable until the 1970s when it was changed to the present name Radio Liban. The radio station relocated to the Sanayeh region in Beirut in the late 1950s. Radio Lebanon is a member of the Asia-Pacific Broadcasting Union.

Radio Lebanon has remained a non-commercial station declining from broadcasting any commercials, except for public aware announcements. It ruled as the only legal broadcaster in Lebanon until 1975 when with the start of the Lebanese Civil War in Lebanon, illegal broadcasters vied for listenership mainly with the establishment of Voice of Lebanon and the rival Voice of the Arab Lebanon and later more than 150 rival AM and FM radio stations, reducing greatly the listenership to Radio Lebanon official radio.

With the legalization of a selected number of private radio stations, Radio Lebanon / Radio Liban remains the only official station on behalf of the Lebanese government. The radio station also boasted in the 1940s and 1950s, some of the best known broadcasters with a pan-Arab following.

The traditional broadcasting was on the medium wave covering most of the Lebanese territory and some neighbouring countries on 836 kHz (for the main Arabic station) and 989 kHz (for the second channel foreign languages programming). With the reorganization of the wavelengths in Lebanon to avoid jamming and interference, the Arab language programming of Radio Lebanon was allocated the frequencies 98.1 and 98.5 FM and the second channel for foreign languages was allocated broadcasting on 96.2 FM.

The transmitters are based in the Barouk Mountains, in Aito Mountain and in Naas, near Bikfaya. There are rebroadcasting antennas also in Beit Mery in Mount Lebanon, Baalbeck in the Bekaa Valley and Jabal Safi in South Lebanon.
