= Ad Achkar =

Lebanese photographer and artist

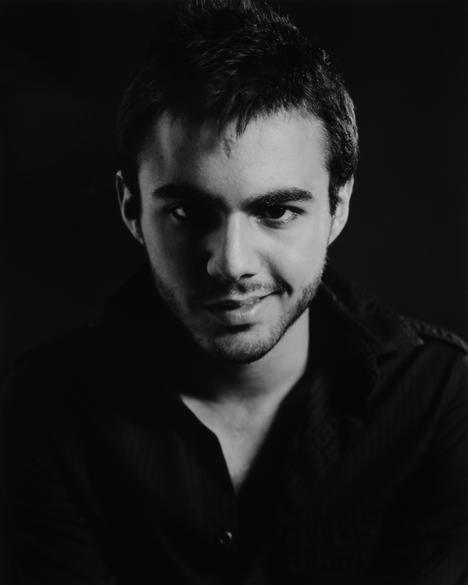
- Born: Aad el Achkar; August 17, 1988 (age 38); Beirut, Lebanon
- Known for: Self-portraits, photography, installations, collages
- Website: www.adachkar.com www.facebook.com/adachkar www.instagram.com/adachkar/ (@adachkar)

Ad Achkar (born August 17, 1988, in rural Beirut, Lebanon) is a Lebanese fine-art photographer and artist. In 2010, Achkar gained a Bachelor of Arts in photography, and achieved the highest ranking in the history of Université Saint-Esprit de Kaslik– USEK, Lebanon for his senior project God Bless Our Home. In 2015, Achkar moved to Berlin where he completed a Masters of Arts and Design in Media Spaces in 2017 at the University of Applied Sciences Europe– UE, Germany.

Following an open call in April 2011 for a competition of young Arab photographers, Achkar joined the competition together with 150 other emerging photographers. Fifteen photographers were chosen to be part of an exhibition in Dubai. The Dubai jury ranked Ad Achkar first place in late 2011.

Along with reading and writing, Achkar indulged himself in the use of diverse mediums and materials, varying from photography, installations, collages, and media arts. He has a wide range of interests, from the comprehension of humanity, nature, and existence, to the relation between humans and nature and the resulting problems. In his photographic installations, God Bless Our Home, waste vitalizing abandoned houses evoke associations with the Arte Povera, all installed objects are recycled and reused materials.

Inspired by Deleuze and Guattari, Achkar developed BwO/CsO 2017, a kinetic machine composed of a colorless silicon skin that folds into its center and stretches itself apart. The installation creates a horizon line that becomes diagonal in-depth and reflects a haptic landscape that is constantly composing itself. The skin stretches itself apart, reflects philosophical thresholds of the existence, and the Body without Organs broadens one's perception and surpasses the horizon. Through abstraction, Achkar left 'the truth' to unravel the mind and disappear within the understanding of humanity and existence.

== Exhibitions ==
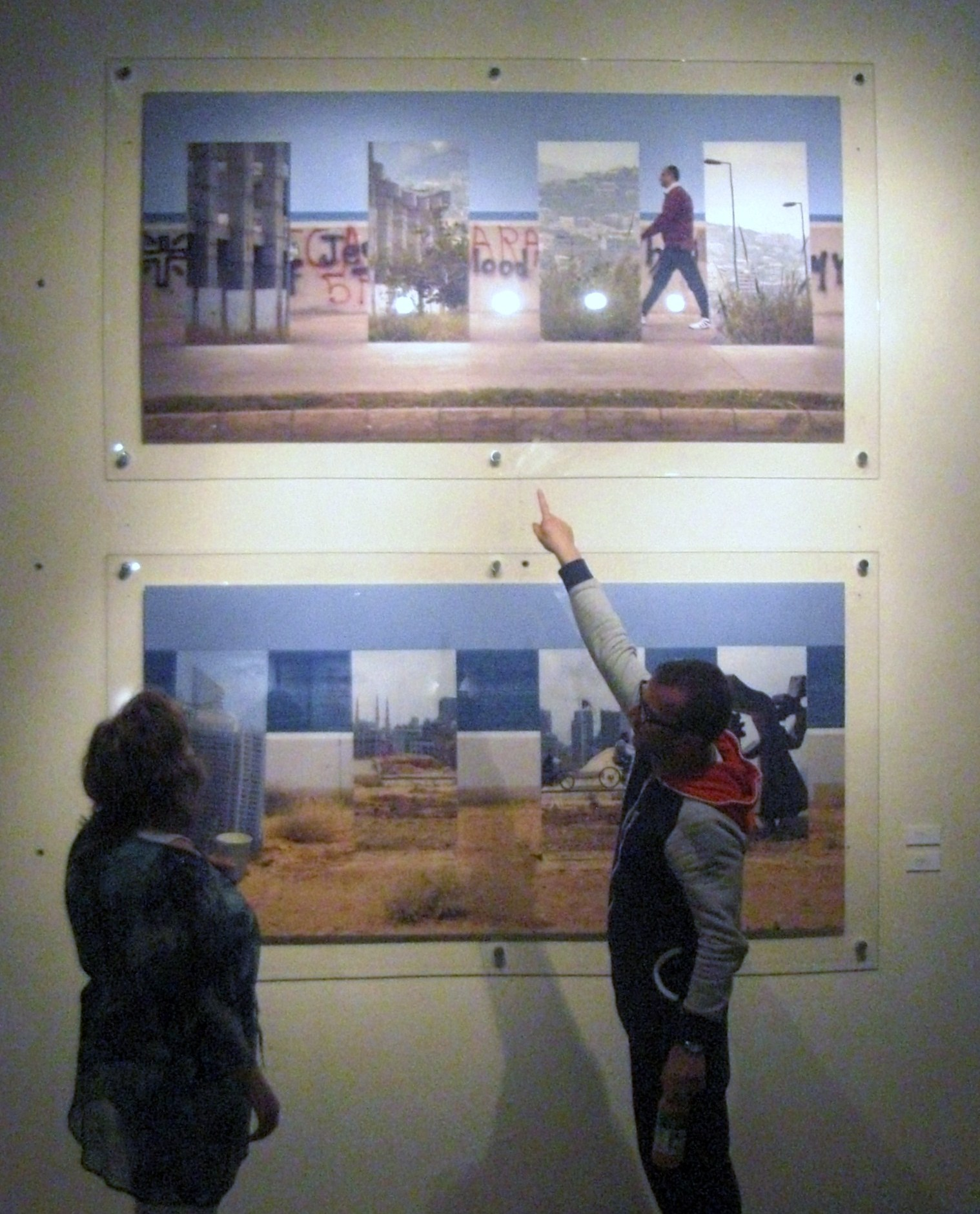
SNAP!Orlando – visitors discussing two pictures of the series Behind the Sea

=== Group exhibitions ===
- 2019 PhotoPlace Gallery, Altered Realities, Vermont, US: The Green Eraser (Ras El Maten).
- 2017 Artscoops, Le Yacht Club, Zaituna Bay, Beirut, Lebanon: ISIS 1947; Original Collage of ‘Al Sayyad’ newspaper [1947].
- 2017 Lab. 30, Kulturhaus Abraxas, Augsburg, Germany: Space Box.
- 2016 Ars Electronica, Linz, Austria: Space Box.
- 2016 Potsdam Institute for Climate Impact Research, Potsdam, Germany: Forschungsneubau, Megatrends 2100, Data visualization, Heavy Happiness.
- 2016 Academie Lounge, Mixed Realities, Berlin, Germany: Trivision/Division.
- 2010 Festival of Lebanese Art Books, Le Palais de l’Unesco, Beirut, Lebanon: God Bless Our Home.
- 2011 Ayyam Gallery, Dubai, The United Arab Emirates: God Bless Our Home.
- 2012 SNAP!, Downtown Orlando, Florida, US: Behind the Sea.

=== Solo exhibitions ===
- 2011 God Bless Our Home exhibited at De Prague, Hamra, Beirut, Lebanon.
- 2014 One with Nature, a Land Art photography installation of Achkar's self-portraits at Nahr El Kalb, near Beirut, Lebanon, 04.Sep – 09.Sep. 2014, see an interview on MTV Lebanon at YouTube, some photos of the installation are exhibited at See.me and published in the 5th Annual Exposure Award.
