= Voice of Lebanon =

Lebanese radio station

Voice of Lebanon (Arabic: صوت لبنان, romanized: Ṣawt Lubnān; French: Voix du Liban; VDL) is a private radio station in Lebanon, owned by the Kataeb Party since 1958. In December 2010, two rival Lebanese radio stations using the same name ran at the same time, but later in 2020, the Kataeb Party claimed back the rights for the radio it founded.

== History ==
Voice of Lebanon was established by the Lebanese Kataeb Party (Phalanges) in 1958 during the 1958 Lebanon crisis. One of the founders was Joseph Abu Khalil, a politician from the Kataeb Party. It broadcast for a few months then ceased with the departure of Lebanese President Camille Chamoun and the arrival of President Fouad Chehab.

With the onslaught of the Lebanese Civil War, the station resumed its work in 1975, with the help of Ibrahim El Khoury (ex-chairman), Joseph El-Hachem, And Elie Saliby; initially using the medium wave and later also broadcasting on FM.

Since December 2010, it is the name of two rival Lebanese radio stations using the same name, one run by the Kataeb Party and the other by the Lebanese government.

In 2020, the Kataeb Party reclaims the name Voice of Lebanon Radio after the court's decision.

== The two separate stations ==
In December 1, 2010, two radio stations were operating under the same name:

Logo of VDL 100.3/100.5

Voice of Lebanon 1

- Owner: Kataeb Party
  - Through الشركة الجديدة للإعلام ش.م.ل Société Nouvelle d'Information S.A.L.
- Frequencies: 100.3 MHz and 100.5 MHz
- Broadcasting from: Ashrafieh, Beirut
- Sub-title: Voice of Freedom and Dignity "صوت الحرية والكرامة"

Logo of VDL 93.3

Voice of Lebanon 2 (Now Voice of All Lebanon)

- Owner: Independent non-partisan
  - Through "الشركة العصرية للإعلام"
- Frequency: 93.3 MHz, alternatives: 93.1 MHz, 93.6 MHz
- Broadcasting from: Dbayeh, Matn District north of Beirut

== Renaming ==
New logo of the independent station renamed Voice of All Lebanon

The independent station on 93.3/93.1 MHz/93.8 MHz, after losing the legal battle over the name "Voice of Lebanon" (in Arabic صوت لبنان pronounced Sawt Lubnan) decided to change its name to Voice of All Lebanon (in Arabic صوت كل لبنان pronounced Sawt kul Lubnan) to differentiate itself from the one run by Kataeb Party on 100.3 MHz/100.5 MHz which kept the original name Voice of Lebanon.

The renaming remained controversial because of similarity of Voice of All Lebanon with Voice of Lebanon. The Kataeb Party has obtained new ruling from the courts to forbid the renamed station from the new name as well to force it to use another more distinct name.
