= Nicolas Abu Samah =

- Born: 1939; Achrafieh, Beirut
- Died: April 8, 2016 (aged 77)
- Occupations: Director; actor; producer
- Years active: 1999–2016

Nicolas Abu Samah (1939 – April 8, 2016) was a Lebanese director, actor, and producer. He introduced dubbing into the Arab world. He was appointed to the Lebanon Television Council, resigning in 2013.

== Television ==
He studied at the Higher Institute of Cinema in Paris, France, where he spent six years. He worked and gained experience on French television. He returned to Lebanon and began work with Levant TV. His directorial debut was a program Yvette Sarsaq. He directed Guare Ataiwha and Wondrous Strange and other soap operas. He has directed more than 2,000 hours of serials and programs. His last work, Romeo Lahoud, was in 1973.

== Dubbing ==
He established his company FILMALI in the late 70's the first dubbing company in the Middle East, which dubbed films into Arabic, such as Sinbad and Treasure Island and Accessories and The Smurfs. He and his wife owned the channel "Anttenne Plus" in Lebanon. Filmali provided dubbing for Mexican soap operas including You or No One, Regardless of the Price, Maria Lina, The Last Hostage and other foreign serials.

== Death ==
He died on April 8, 2016, at age 77 years.
