= National Broadcasting Network (Lebanon) =

NBN
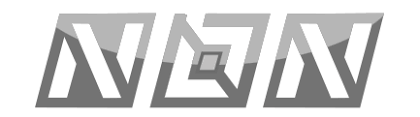
- Country: Lebanon
- Broadcast area: Lebanon
- Headquarters: Beirut, Lebanon

Programming
- Language: Arabic

Ownership
- Owner: National Broadcasting Network s.a.l.

History
- Launched: 4 May 1996

National Broadcasting Network known as NBN is the official television of the Lebanese Amal Movement. The National Broadcasting Network s.a.l. NBN, is a Lebanese private company by shares, founded in 1996 by Lebanon's Parliament Speaker and head of Amal movement, Nabih Berri, pursuant to Decree No. 10059 of 10 January 1998.

== Ownership ==
The Berri family owns the station through three shareholders, Nabih Berri's siblings Mahmoud and Amina, as well as his sister-in-law Samira Assi, owning a total of 19.70%. The other major shareholders are close political allies of Berri and leading officials of the Amal Movement, from the Hamdan family (29.8%), Ahmad Hussein and NBN's CEO Kassem Soueid (10% each).
