= Moawad =

Moawad is a surname. Notable people with the surname include:

- Moawad GadElrab (1929–1983), Egyptian physician, artist, writer, author and professor
- Hassan Sayed Moawad (died 2007), Egyptian basketball player
- Kayssar Moawad, Lebanese physician and politician
- Michel Moawad (born 1972), Lebanese politician who resigned from Parliament in protest after the 2020 Beirut Explosion
- Mohamed Moawad (born 1987), Egyptian male volleyball player
- Nayla Moawad (born 1940), Lebanese politician and former First Lady of Lebanon
- Nazli Moawad, Egyptian political science professor at Cairo University
- Omar Moawad (born 2006), Egyptian professional footballer
- René Moawad (1925–1989), Lebanese politician who served as the 9th President of Lebanon
- Sayed Moawad (born 1979), Egyptian retired professional footballer
- Wajdi Moawad, OC, (born 1968), Lebanese-Canadian writer, actor, and director

== See also ==
- René Moawad Garden, known as the Sanayeh Garden, located in the Sanayeh district of Beirut, Lebanon
- Mouawad
- Mowad
