= Camille Ziade =

Lebanese politician (1943–2022)

Member of the Parliament of Lebanon
- In office 1992–2000
- Constituency: Keserwan District

Personal details
- Born: 20 March 1943 Beirut, Greater Lebanon
- Died: 2 October 2022 (aged 79) Herharaya, Lebanon
- Party: DRM

Camille Ziade (Arabic: كميل زيادة; 20 March 1943 – 2 October 2022) was a Lebanese politician. He served in the Parliament of Lebanon from 1992 to 2000, representing the Keserwan District. Self-described as a moderate, he opposed the economic policy of Prime Minister Rafic Hariri.

== Biography ==
Ziade was a member of the Democratic Renewal Movement. After his defeat in 2000, he joined the Qornet Shehwan Gathering the following year. A few months later, he became a member of the executive committee of the Democratic Renewal Movement. In 2005, he ran for Parliament on the March 14 Alliance list, but failed to gain a seat. After the death of Nassib Lahoud, he became president of the Democratic Renewal Movement, a position he held for three years.

Ziade died in Herharaya on 2 October 2022, at the age of 79.
