= Boutros Harb =

Lebanese politician (born 1944)

Cheikh Boutros Harb الشيخ بطرس حرب
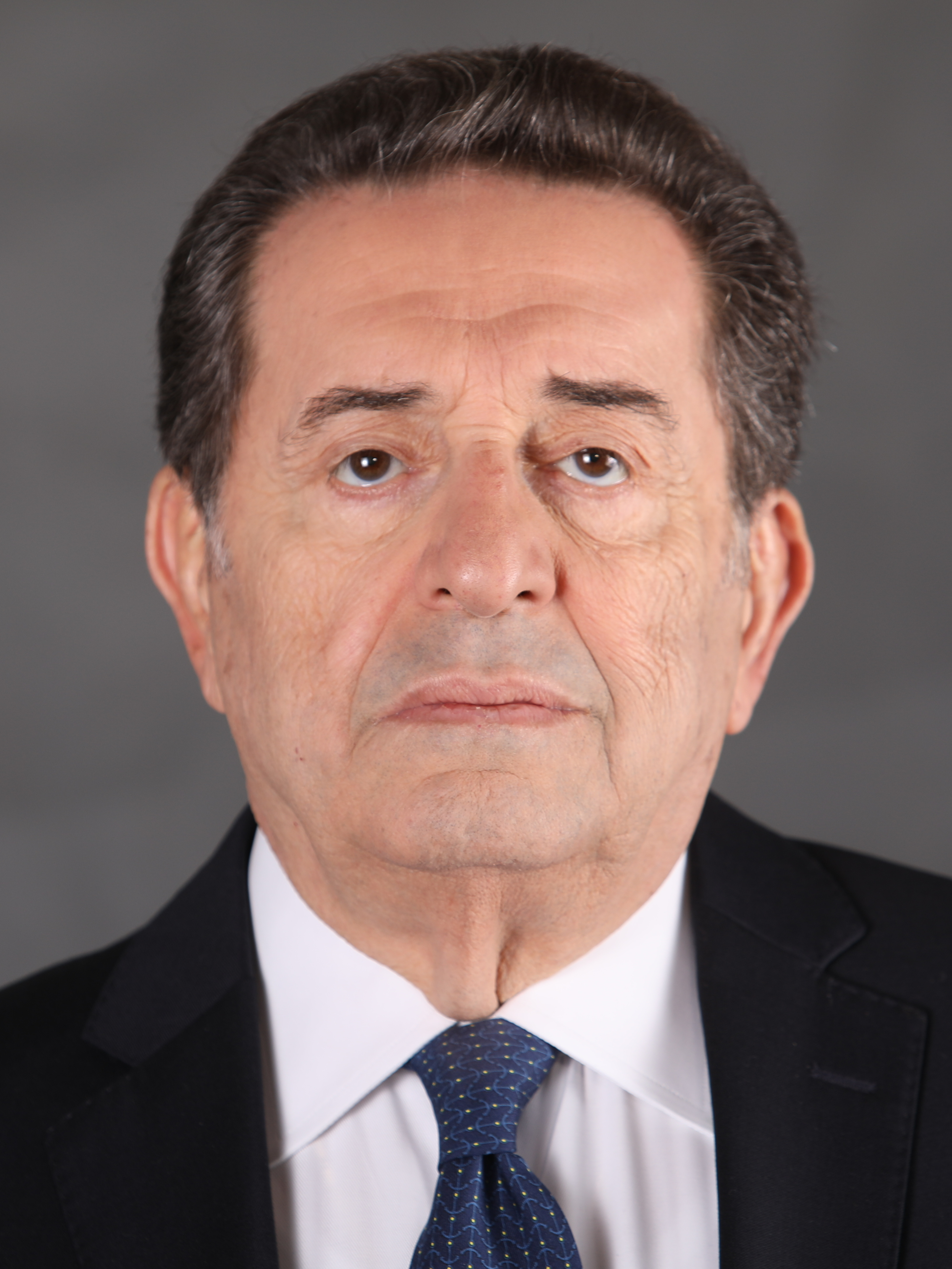
- Cheikh Boutros Harb in 2018

Member of the parliament of Lebanon
- In office 16 April 1972 – 22 May 2018
- Constituency: Batroun

Minister of Telecommunications
- In office 15 February 2014 – 18 December 2016
- Prime Minister: Tammam Salam
- Preceded by: Nicolas Sehnaoui
- Succeeded by: Jamal Jarrah

Personal details
- Born: 3 August 1944 (age 81) Tannourine, Lebanon
- Party: Independent

Cheikh Boutros Harb (Arabic: الشيخ بطرس حرب; born 3 August 1944) is a Lebanese politician who served at different cabinet posts including Minister of public works and transportation, Minister of education and Minister of Telecommunications.

== Early life and education ==
Cheikh Boutros was born into a prominent Maronite family in Tannourine, Lebanon on 3 August 1944. He holds a law degree.

== Career ==
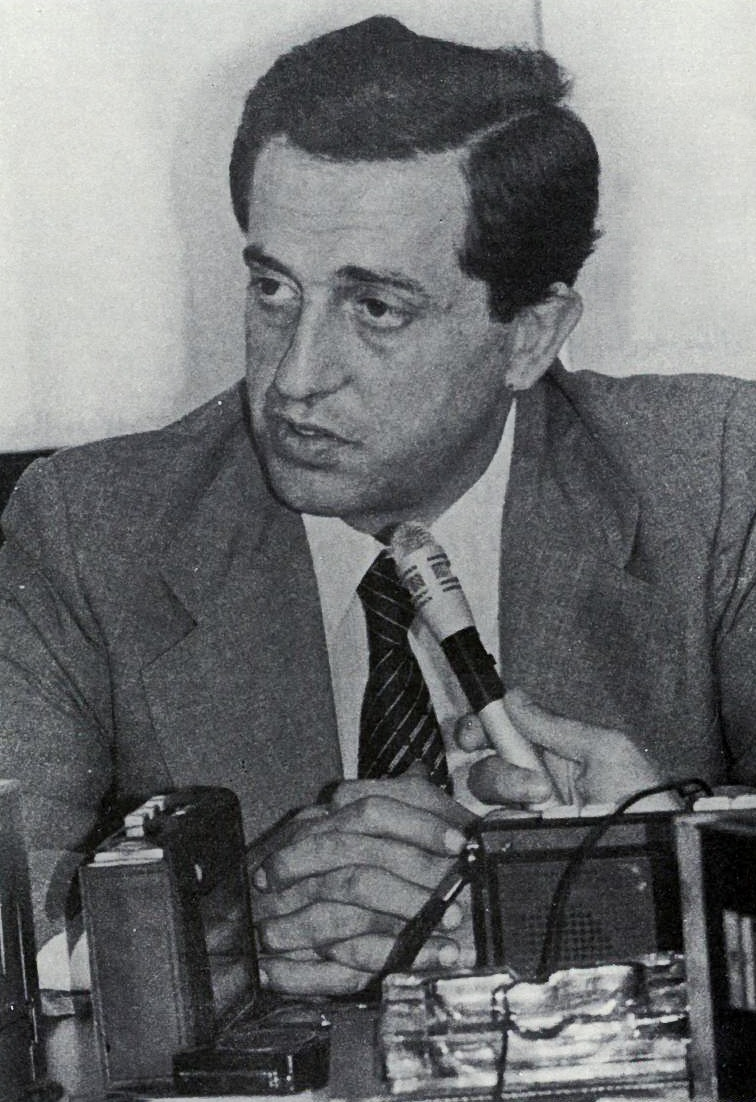
Cheikh Boutros in a press conference, 1988.

A lawyer by profession, Harb first held political office when elected in 1972 as the Maronite deputy for Batroun, in the North Governorate of Lebanon, being appointed public transport minister for labour and minister of the national education and art schools in 1979 in Salim Hoss's government, and remaining minister until 1980. From 1990 to 1992 Harb returned to the education ministry in the cabinet of then Prime Minister Omar Karame.

Harb had a major role in helping negotiate the Taef Agreement, which brought the Lebanese civil war to an end by electing a power sharing agreement within the Lebanese Parliament, giving Christians and Muslims equal representation in Parliament by assigning seats to sects.

He was a prominent member of the opposition during the governments of Rafic Hariri; in particular to Nassib Lahoud, Salim Hoss, Omar Karami, Mohammad Youssef Baydoun and Hussein Husseini. He announced his candidacy for the Lebanese Presidency during the 1998 elections but withdrew his nomination the day the polls began. Émile Lahoud was unanimously elected.

After a short period of support for the government of Salim Hoss in 1998, he rejoined the opposition. In 2000, he broke his alliance with Nayla Moawad and Omar Karami, and allied himself at the election booth with Soleiman Franjieh Jr, and the Tripoli Bloc of Mohammad Safadi and Najib Mikati. In the general elections held in 2000, Harb won the seat of Batroun, the second district of north Lebanon.

In 2001, as one of the founding members of the Qornet Shehwan Gathering, he strongly expressed his opposition to the policies of the Hariri government and to Syrian hegemony. In 2004, Harb participated, with Nayla Moawad, Omar Karami, Salim Hoss, Hussein Husseini and Albert Mansour, in the creation of a National Face for Reform. In 2004, he declared himself a nominee for the Presidency of Lebanon, however due to a Syrian-engineered constitutional amendment extending the term of President Émile Lahoud, he was unable to run. He then broke his alliance with Omar Karami who he considered to be too pro-Syrian.

In 2005, after the assassination of former Prime Minister Rafik Hariri, Harb joined the massive protests and demonstrations against the Syrian occupation of Lebanon and demanded that Syrian troops withdraw immediately. Like many other, he accused the Syrian government of ordering the death of Rafiq Hariri. As a founding member of the 14 March Alliance, he was one of the several candidates to run for the Lebanese Presidency in 2008, but all major parties decided to elect a compromise candidate, Michel Sleiman.

Harb is the lawyer of the Tueni family, and filed a lawsuit against two Syrian officers due to their alleged roles in Gebran Tueni's assassination in December 2005.

Cheikh Boutros Harb is the elected head of the board of directors of the American University of Science and Technology.

== Hezbollah controversies ==
In 2007, Harb called for the integration of Hezbollah's military arm into the Lebanese Army.

Leaked diplomatic cables indicated that he had told the U.S.' diplomats in Lebanon during the 2006 Lebanon War that an Israeli operation to control Hezbollah's strongholds of Maroun al-Ras and Bint Jbeil could enable a U.S.-brokered ceasefire and that Syria will not be a part of the solution to the crisis. He also said that Hassan Nasrallah cannot be allowed to appear as a hero to the region, despite his rising popularity as a result of a wave of sympathy.

== Assassination attempt ==
Following an attempt to assassinate fellow March 14 movement member and head of Lebanese Forces Samir Geagea, in early July 2012 Harb escaped an assassination attempt by Hezbollah, which a government official said was "part of a series of assassination attempts" against Lebanese politicians. Harb commented that he had been warned by Lebanese security forces that they had found "bomb detonators in a lift" at his Beirut office.

== Personal life ==
Harb is married to Marlene Joseph Tabet together have three children, Majd, Hala and Nour. Majd is a lawyer that ran for the 2022 Lebanese general election almost defeating Gebran Bassil in Batroun and has also attempted to prosecute Hezbollah for financial crimes through Al-Qard Al-Hasan Association.

== See also ==
- Qornet Chehwan Gathering
- Cedar Revolution

Political offices
Preceded by Nicolas Sehnaoui	Minister of Telecommunications (Lebanon); 2014–2016	Succeeded by Jamal Jarrah
