= René Moawad =

President of Lebanon in 1989

His Excellency René Moawad OM ONC
- رِينِيه مُعَوَض
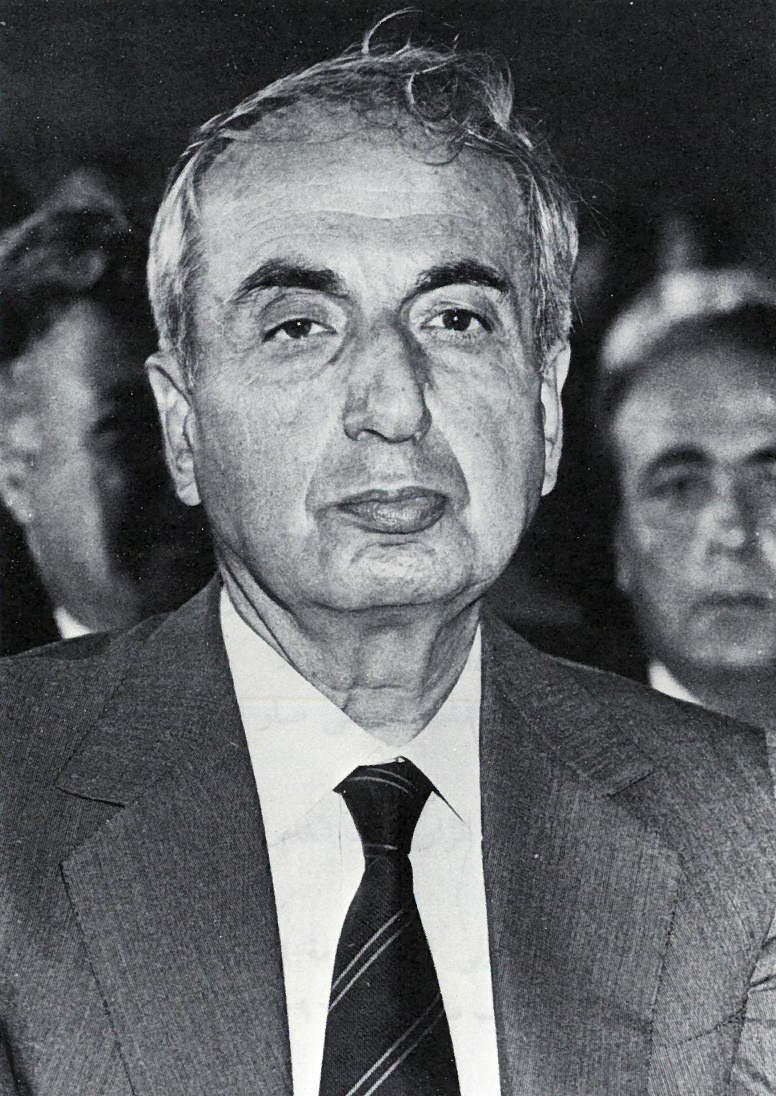
- Moawad in 1988

9th President of Lebanon
- In office 5 November 1989 – 22 November 1989*
- Prime Minister: Salim Al-Huss
- Preceded by: Salim Al-Huss (acting)
- Succeeded by: Salim Al-Huss (acting)

Personal details
- Born: 17 April 1925 Zgharta, Greater Lebanon
- Died: 22 November 1989 (aged 64) Beirut, Lebanon
- Cause of death: Assassination
- Party: Independent
- Spouse: Nayla Moawad (m. 1965)
- Children: 2, including Michel Moawad
- Education: Saint Joseph University
- Profession: Lawyer; politician
- *Moawad's term was disputed by Michel Aoun

René Anis Moawad (Arabic: رينيه أنيس معوض; 17 April 1925 – 22 November 1989) was a Lebanese politician who served as the 9th president of Lebanon for seventeen days, from 5 to 22 November 1989, before his assassination by unknown assailants.

== Early life and education ==
René Anis Moawad was born on April 17, 1925 in Zgharta city in North Lebanon, the son of Anis Moawad and Evelyn Shalhoub. He was educated at De La Salle School in Tripoli, before pursuing his secondary education at Collège Saint Joseph – Antoura des Pères Lazaristes. He went to Saint Joseph University in Beirut and graduated with a law degree in 1947. He subsequently joined the law firm of Abdallah El-Yafi, a former prime minister; before opening his own law firm in Tripoli in 1951.

== Parliamentary career ==
Moawad made his first foray into politics in 1951, when he unsuccessfully contested a Zgharta seat in the National Assembly. Although he was defeated, the election forged a crucial alliance between him and the Frangieh clan. He was subsequently elected to the National Assembly in 1957, and reelected in 1960, 1964, 1968, and 1972, the last parliamentary election held before his election to the presidency (the civil war that raged from 1975 to 1990 prevented further elections from being held in the meantime).

In 1952, Moawad was briefly arrested and detained in Aley for participating in the national uprising that forced the resignation of President Bechara El Khoury, Lebanon's first post-independence leader. He also fell out with Khoury's successor, Camille Chamoun, when the latter hinted at a possible constitutional change to extend his six-year term, which was due to expire in 1958. He went into exile in Latakia, Syria. It was during his exile that he won his first election to the National Assembly.

Moawad became a strong supporter of Chamoun's successor, Fuad Chehab. He chaired the Parliamentary Law Committee and the Finance and Budget Committee. He served as Minister of Posts and Telecommunications in the government of Prime Minister Rashid Karami (also a Chehabist) from 31 October 1961 to 20 February 1964. He later served as Minister of Public Works, again under Karami, from 16 January to 24 November 1969, during the presidency of Chehab's successor, Charles Helou. In 1970, he supported Chehabist presidential candidate and old friend Elias Sarkis against his old ally Suleiman Frangieh. Frangieh won the election by a single vote.

On 25 October 1980, Moawad returned to the Cabinet as Minister of National Education and Fine Arts, in the government of President Elias Sarkis (who had succeeded Frangieh in 1976) and Prime Minister Shafik Wazzan, a position he held until the expiry of Sarkis's term on 24 September 1982. The strength of his alliance with Suleiman Frangieh was severely tested in that year, when Moawad voted to support Bachir Gemayel, Frangieh's rival, for the presidency. Despite Frangieh's anger, their friendship was so deep that it survived the test.

== Election and death ==
Following the Taif Agreement to end the civil war, the National Assembly met on 5 November 1989 at the Qoleiat air base in North Lebanon and elected Moawad as President of Lebanon. The post had been vacant since the expiration of Amine Gemayel's term in 1988. The National Assembly had failed to elect a successor at that time. Seventeen days after being elected, as he was returning from Lebanon's Independence Day celebrations on November 22, 1989, a 250 kg car bomb was detonated next to Moawad's motorcade in West Beirut, killing him and 23 others. Chawki Choweiri, Lebanon's UN representative, said "This is the major catastrophe of the years of catastrophes we have had so far. We may have lost one of the last opportunities to unite the nation."

To this day, the identity and motives of those responsible remain a matter of debate. Returning from the Cedar Revolution protest against the Syrian occupation on 14 March 2005, Nayla Moawad declared, "The independence of Lebanon was regained on March 14, and on March 14 I felt that I avenged (my husband's) assassination."

== Personal life and legacy ==
A Maronite Christian noted for his moderate views, Moawad had given some citizens hope that the long civil war in Lebanon could be ended. He was an example of non-violence and accommodating and accepting others in the Arab world, his culture of non-confrontation, troubleshooting conflict and his courage led all of the Lebanese parties to accept him as a president to end the war. Before he died, Moawad had addressed the nation with these words: "There can be no country or dignity without unity of the people, and there can be no unity without agreement, and there can be no agreement without conciliation, and there can be no conciliation without forgiveness and compromise." He was succeeded by Elias Hrawi.

As the son of Anis Bey Mouawad, who had been mayor of the municipality, and his wife Evelyn Shalhoub, Moawad was the scion of a prominent Zgharta family, but he was the first member of the family to represent the constituency in Parliament.

In 1965, Moawad married Nayla Moawad, a relative of Moawad's old political opponent Bechara El Khoury. Despite the historical animosity between their two families, as well as the fact that she was fifteen years his junior, the marriage was evidently a happy one. Their daughter Rima Moawad is now a lawyer and a graduate of Harvard University in the United States, while their son Michel Moawad is a lawyer and businessman who graduated from Sorbonne University in Paris.

Moawad's widow Nayla founded the René Moawad Foundation, to further the goals of dialogue, peace, and social justice, to which he had dedicated his life. Nayla Moawad was elected to the National Assembly in 1991. She was a member of the opposition Qornet Shehwan Gathering, which opposed the Syrian military presence in Lebanon. In 2004 she announced her candidacy for the Presidency to succeed Émile Lahoud, whose term legally ended in November.

Moawad's son, Michel, founded a new political party in 2006 called Independence Movement. The movement is part of the anti-Syrian Qornet Shehwan Gathering and the March 14 Alliance. In 2005–2009 it had 3 Maronite Christian MPs for the Zgharta District in the Lebanese Parliament, Nayla Moawad, Jawad Simon Boulos and Samir Frangieh. Since 2009, the party has been led by Michel Moawad, Jawad Simon Boulos and Youssef Bahaa El Douaihy.

== Memorials ==
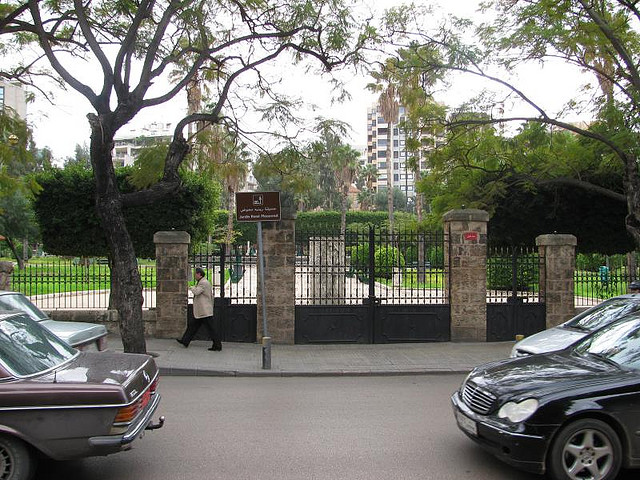
René Moawad Garden, Beirut

Originally called the Hamidi Public Garden and for decades referred to by the public as the Sanayeh Garden, The René Moawad Garden was constructed in the first decade of the 20th century. It was renamed in honor of René Moawad following his assassination near the garden. Also after his assassination, the Qoleiat air base was later renamed in his honor, by a decree from the Lebanese parliament officially becoming René Mouawad Airbase.

== See also ==
- List of assassinated Lebanese politicians
- List of heads of state and government who were assassinated or executed
- List of presidents of Lebanon

Political offices
Preceded by Salim Al-Huss; Acting	President of Lebanon; 1989	Succeeded by Salim Al-Huss; Acting
