= North III =

- Constituency for the Parliament of Lebanon
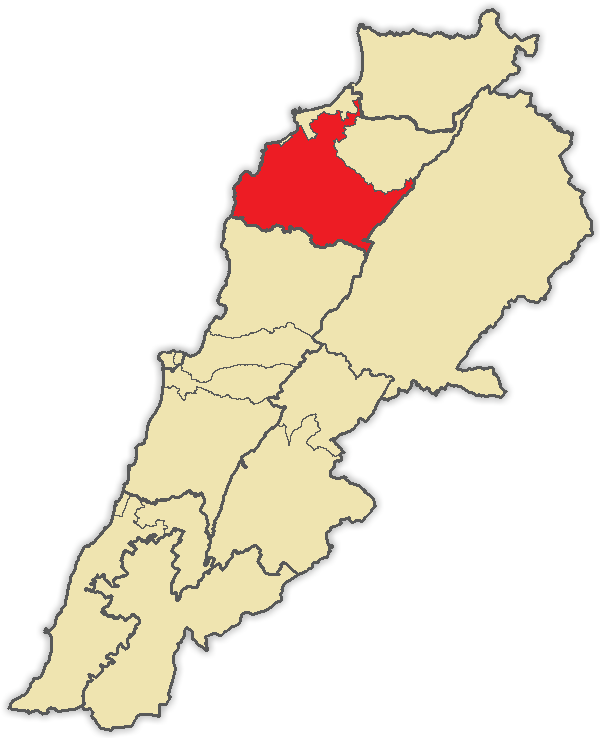
- Governorate: North
- Electorate: 249,454 (2018)

Current constituency
- Created: 2017
- Number of members: 10 (7 Maronite, 3 Greek Orthodox)

North III (Arabic: دائرة الشمال الثالثة) is an electoral district in Lebanon, established under the 2017 electoral law. The district elects 10 members of the Lebanese National Assembly - 7 Maronites and 3 Greek Orthodox. The constituency contains four 'minor districts', Batroun (corresponding to Batroun District, electing 2 Maronites), Bcharre (corresponding to Bcharre District, electing 2 Maronites), Koura (corresponding to Koura District, electing 3 Greek Orthodox) and Zghorta (corresponding to Zgharta, electing 3 Maronites).

== Electorate ==
The electorate is predominantly Christian; 68.1% are Maronite, 20.7% Greek Orthodox, 8.94% Sunni, 0.93% Shia, 0.73% Greek Catholic, 0.38% from other Christian communities and 0.24% Alawite. Below data from 2017;

District	Sunni		Shia		Druze		Alawite		Maronite		Greek Orthodox		Greek Catholic		Armenian Orthodox		Armenian Catholic		Syriac Orthodox		Syriac Catholic		Other Minorities (Note: The Minorities quota includes six different Christian sects Syriac Orthodox, Syriac Catholic, Latin Catholics, Assyrians, Chaldean Catholics and Copts.)		Evangelical		Jews		"Others" (Note: Presumably consisting mainly of individuals whose sectarian affiliation has not been identified and/or individuals not belonging to any of the 18 recognized sects.)		Total
District	No.	%	No.	%	No.	%	No.	%	No.	%	No.	%	No.	%	No.	%	No.	%	No.	%	No.	%	No.	%	No.	%	No.	%	No.	%	No.
Batroun	3,764	6.26	1,034	1.72	11	0.02	42	0.07	41,964	69.79	10,070	16.75	1,994	3.32	260	0.43	101	0.17	182	0.30	80	0.13	254	0.42	80	0.13	1	0.00	291	0.48	60,128
Bcharre	109	0.22	27	0.05		0.00	6	0.01	46,512	94.64	1,380	2.81	554	1.13	81	0.16	26	0.05	87	0.18	34	0.07	107	0.22	55	0.11			170	0.35	49,148
Koura	8,626	14.32	1,202	1.99	11	0.02	478	0.79	12,991	21.56	35,335	58.64	713	1.18	99	0.16	30	0.05	67	0.11	32	0.05	187	0.31	233	0.39			254	0.42	60,258
Zgharta	9,976	12.88	151	0.19	11	0.01	76	0.10	61,121	78.92	4,378	5.65	868	1.12	135	0.17	167	0.22	82	0.11	45	0.06	172	0.22	97	0.13			164	0.21	77,443
Source: Lebanon Files

== 2018 election ==
Ahead of the 2018 Lebanese general election 4 lists were registered. The "Strong North" list, headed by Gebran Bassil, gathered the Free Patriotic Movement, the Independence Movement, the Future Movement, whilst the "Strong Republic Pulse" gathered the Lebanese Forces, the Kataeb Party and the Democratic Left Movement. The "With Us for the North and Lebanon" gathered the Marada Movement, the Syrian Social Nationalist Party and Boutros Harb whilst the civil society list "Kulluna Watani" (We are all National) gathered the Movement of Citizens in the State, Sabaa Party and Sah.

=== Result by lists ===
List	Votes	% of electoral district	Seats	Members elected	Parties
"With Us for the North and Lebanon"	40,788	35.22	4		Harb-Marada-SSNP
"Strong Republic Pulse"	37,376	32.28	3		LF-Kataeb-DLM
"Strong North"	33,342	28.79	3		FPM-IM
"Kulluna Watani"	3,160	2.73	0		Saaba-Citizens in the State

=== Result by candidate ===
Name	Sect	List	Party	Votes	% of electoral district	% of preferential votes for sect seat	% of list	Elected?
Gebran Bassil	Maronite (Batroun)	"Strong North"	FPM	12,269	10.60	38.36	36.80	Yes
Tony Franjieh	Maronite (Zgharta)	"With Us for the North and Lebanon"	Marada	11,407	9.85	33.02	27.97	Yes
Fadi Saad	Maronite (Batroun)	"Strong Republic Pulse"	Lebanese Forces	9,842	8.50	30.77	26.33	Yes
Michel Moawad	Maronite (Zgharta)	"Strong North"	Independence Movement	8,571	7.40	24.81	25.71	Yes
Fadi Karam	Greek Orthodox (Koura)	"Strong Republic Pulse"	Lebanese Forces	7,822	6.75	29.72	20.93	
Strida Geagea	Maronite (Bcharre)	"Strong Republic Pulse"	Lebanese Forces	6,677	5.77	35.66	17.86	Yes
Boutros Harb	Maronite (Batroun)	"With Us for the North and Lebanon"		6,155	5.32	19.24	15.09	
Joseph Isaac	Maronite (Bcharre)	"Strong Republic Pulse"	Lebanese Forces	5,990	5.17	31.99	16.03	Yes
Estephan Douaihy	Maronite (Zgharta)	"With Us for the North and Lebanon"	Marada	5,435	4.69	15.73	13.32	Yes
Selim Saadeh	Greek Orthodox (Koura)	"With Us for the North and Lebanon"	SSNP	5,263	4.55	20.00	12.90	Yes
Melhem Gibran Touk	Maronite (Bcharre)	"With Us for the North and Lebanon"		4,649	4.01	24.83	11.40	
Fayez Ghosn	Greek Orthodox (Koura)	"With Us for the North and Lebanon"	Marada	4,224	3.65	16.05	10.36	Yes
Pierre Raffoul	Maronite (Zgharta)	"Strong North"	FPM	3,749	3.24	10.85	11.24	
George Atallah	Greek Orthodox (Koura)	"Strong North"	FPM	3,383	2.92	12.85	10.15	Yes
Nicolas Ghosn	Greek Orthodox (Koura)	"Strong North"	Future	3,190	2.75	12.12	9.57	
Marius Baini	Maronite (Zgharta)	"Strong Republic Pulse"	Lebanese Forces	2,776	2.40	8.04	7.43	
Samer Saada	Maronite (Batroun)	"Strong Republic Pulse"	Kataeb	2,470	2.13	7.72	6.61	
Salim Bey Karam	Maronite (Zgharta)	"With Us for the North and Lebanon"	Marada	1,590	1.37	4.60	3.90	
Said Touq	Maronite (Bcharre)	"Strong North"	FPM	1,112	0.96	5.94	3.34	
Layal Bou Moussa	Maronite (Batroun)	"Kulluna Watani"	Citizens in the State	952	0.82	2.98	30.13	
Abdallah Zakhem	Greek Orthodox (Koura)	"With Us for the North and Lebanon"		779	0.67	2.96	1.91	
Fadwa Nassif	Greek Orthodox (Koura)	"Kulluna Watani"	Sabaa	463	0.40	1.76	14.65	
Albert Androus	Greek Orthodox (Koura)	"Strong Republic Pulse"	Kataeb	442	0.38	1.68	1.18	
Bassam Ghantous	Greek Orthodox (Koura)	"Kulluna Watani"	Sabaa	352	0.30	1.34	11.14	
George Mansour	Greek Orthodox (Koura)	"Strong Republic Pulse"	Democratic Left	305	0.26	1.16	0.82	
Riad Ghazala	Maronite (Zgharta)	"Kulluna Watani"		293	0.25	0.85	9.27	
Antoine Yamin	Maronite (Zgharta)	"Kulluna Watani"	Sabaa	243	0.21	0.70	7.69	
Michel Douaihy	Maronite (Zgharta)	"Strong Republic Pulse"	Kataeb	194	0.17	0.56	0.52	
Antonia Ghamra	Maronite (Zgharta)	"Kulluna Watani"		149	0.13	0.43	4.72	
Edmond Touk	Maronite (Bcharre)	"Kulluna Watani"	Sabaa	122	0.11	0.65	3.86	
Nemeh Ibrahim	Maronite (Batroun)	"Strong North"	FPM	118	0.10	0.37	0.35	
Jawad Boulos	Maronite (Zgharta)	"Strong North"	Independence Movement	109	0.09	0.32	0.33	
Greta Saab	Greek Orthodox (Koura)	"Strong North"	FPM	97	0.08	0.37	0.29	
Antoine Khoury Harb	Maronite (Batroun)	"Kulluna Watani"		88	0.08	0.28	2.78	
George Boutros	Maronite (Bcharre)	"Strong North"	FPM	76	0.07	0.41	0.23	
Maurice Koura	Maronite (Bcharre)	"Kulluna Watani"	Sabaa	73	0.06	0.39	2.31	
Kayssar Moawad	Maronite (Zgharta)	"Strong Republic Pulse"		31	0.03	0.09	0.08	
Rui Issa Khoury	Maronite (Bcharre)	"With Us for the North and Lebanon"		25	0.02	0.13	0.06	
