= Ministry of Economy and Trade =

Ministry of Economy and Trade may refer to:

- Ministry of Economy and Trade (Kazakhstan)
- Ministry of Economy and Trade (Lebanon)
- Ministry of Economy and Trade (Libya)
- Ministry of Economy and Trade (Moldova) – today Ministry of Economic Development and Digitalization
- Ministry of Economy and Trade (Palestine)
- Ministry of Economy and Trade (Syria)
