= Philippe Ziade =

Philippe Ziade may refer to:

- Philippe Ziade (journalist) (1909–2005), Lebanese journalist
- Philippe Ziade (businessman) (born 1976), Lebanese-American entrepreneur and honorary consul of Lebanon in Nevada
