= Jamal Jarrah =

Lebanese businessman and politician (born 1956)

- جمال جراح

Minister of Information
- In office January 31, 2019 – January 21, 2020
- Prime Minister: Saad Hariri
- Preceded by: Melhem Antoun Riachy
- Succeeded by: Manal Abdel Samad

Minister of Telecommunications
- In office December 18, 2016 – January 31, 2019
- Prime Minister: Saad Hariri
- Preceded by: Boutros Harb
- Succeeded by: Mohammad Shoucair

Member of the Lebanese Parliament
- In office 2005–2018
- Constituency: Western Beqaa District / Rashaya

Personal details
- Born: 1956 (age 69–70) Al-Marj, Lebanon
- Party: Future Movement
- Spouse: Afaf Ajami
- Children: 3
- Relatives: Ziad Jarrah (nephew)
- Education: Lebanese American University

Jamal Jarrah (Arabic: جمال الجراح, romanized: Jamal al-Jarrah; born 1956) is a Lebanese businessman and politician. He served as Minister of Telecommunications and Minister of Information in the cabinet of Lebanese Prime Minister Saad Hariri. He is currently a member of the Future Movement Party.

== Biography ==
Jarrah was born in 1956 in Al-Marj, Lebanon. He attended the Lebanese American University and then worked for an electrical equipment company in Jordan before working for Bankmed, becoming a regional director in Beqaa.

He was elected to the Lebanese Parliament in 2005 as a member of the Future Movement party, representing the Western Beqaa constituency. He became Minister of Telecommunications in the cabinet of Prime Minister Saad Hariri in 2016 and held the post until 2019 when we was appointed to serve as Minister of Information. He was Minister of Information from 2019 until 2020.

While serving as Minister of Telecommunications, Jarrah had charges brought against him for wasting public funds.

== Family ==
He is a paternal uncle of al-Qaeda terrorist Ziad Jarrah, who hijacked United Airlines Flight 93 as part of the September 11 attacks.

Political offices
Preceded by Melhem Antoun Riachy	Minister of Information; 2019–2020	Succeeded by Manal Abdel Samad
Preceded by Boutros Harb	Minister of Telecommunications; 2016–2019	Succeeded by Mohammad Shoucair
