= 2005 Lebanese general election =

Lebanese parliamentary election

- 29 May 2005, 5 June 2005, 12 June 2005, and 20 June 2005

All 128 seats to the Parliament of Lebanon
- Turnout: 46.5% ▲6%
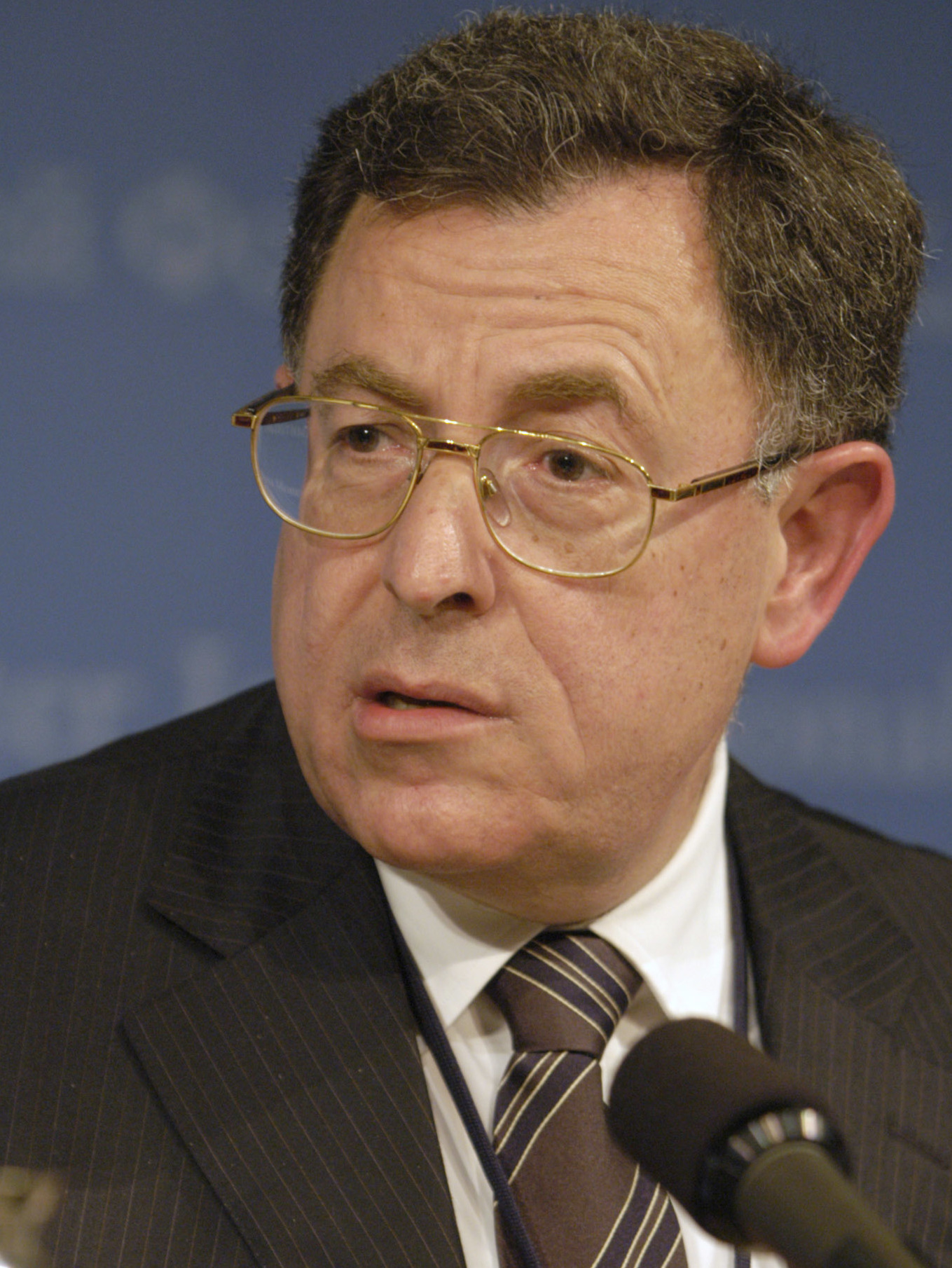

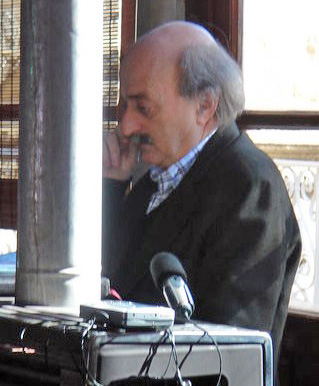

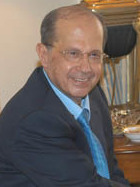

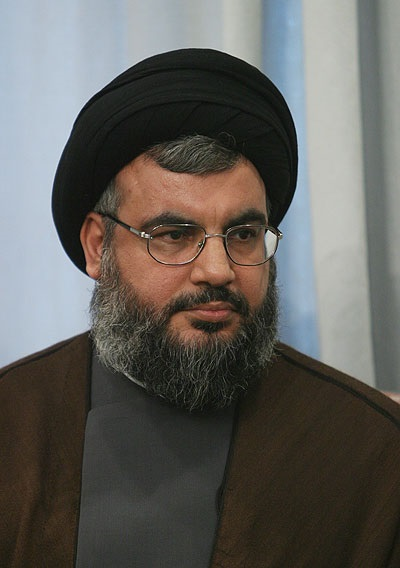

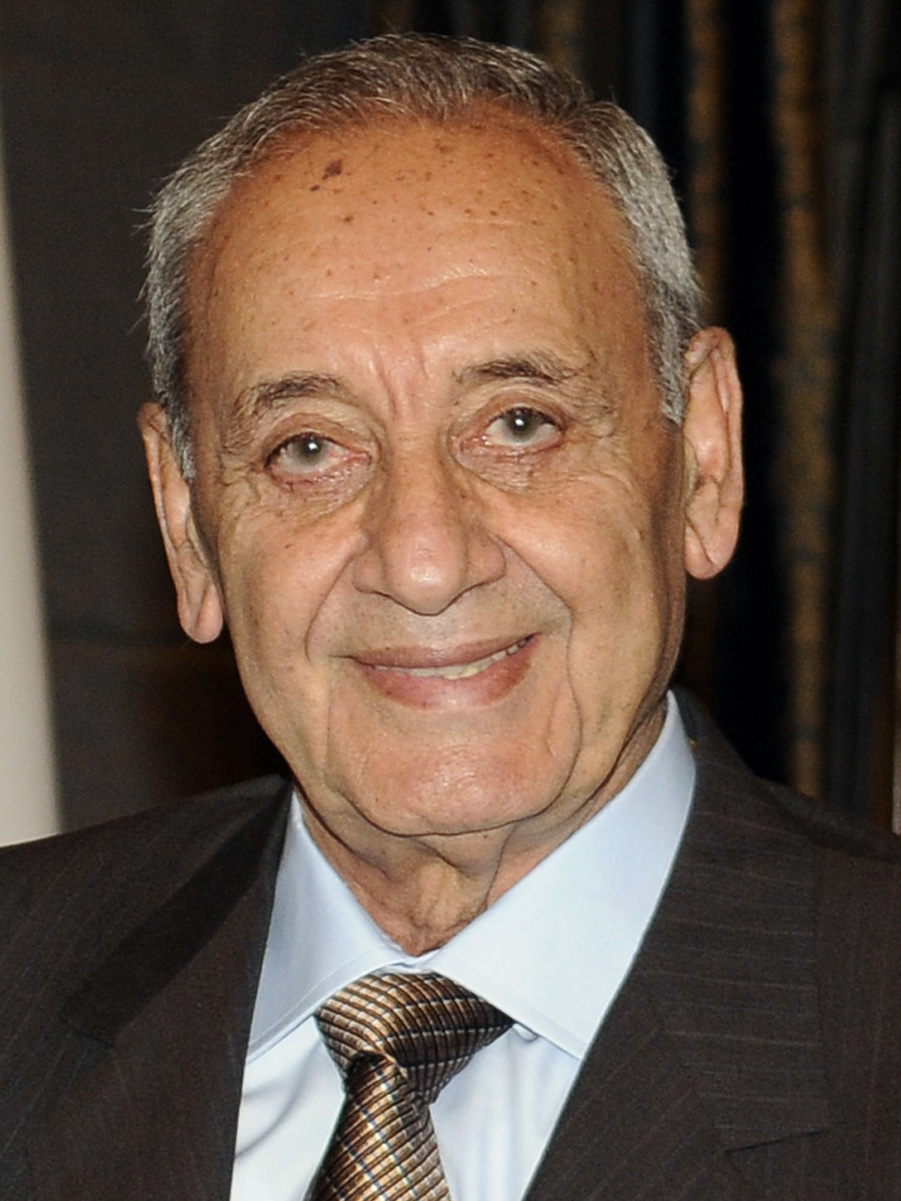

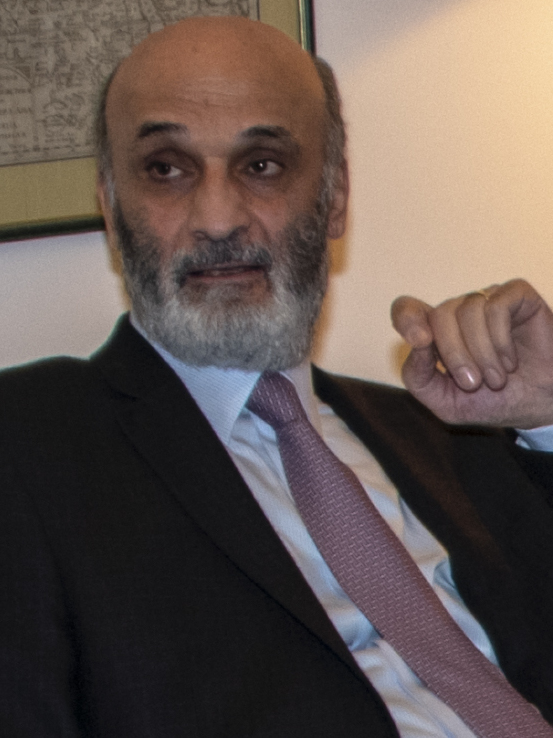

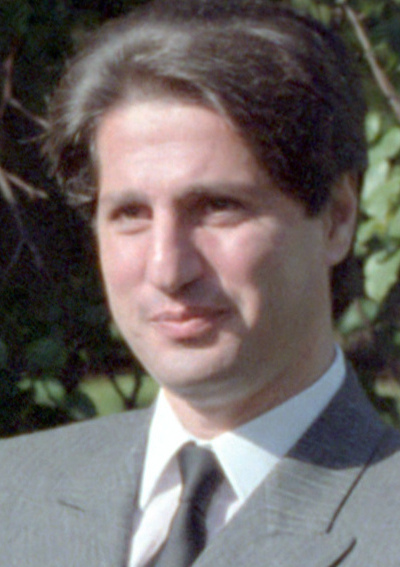

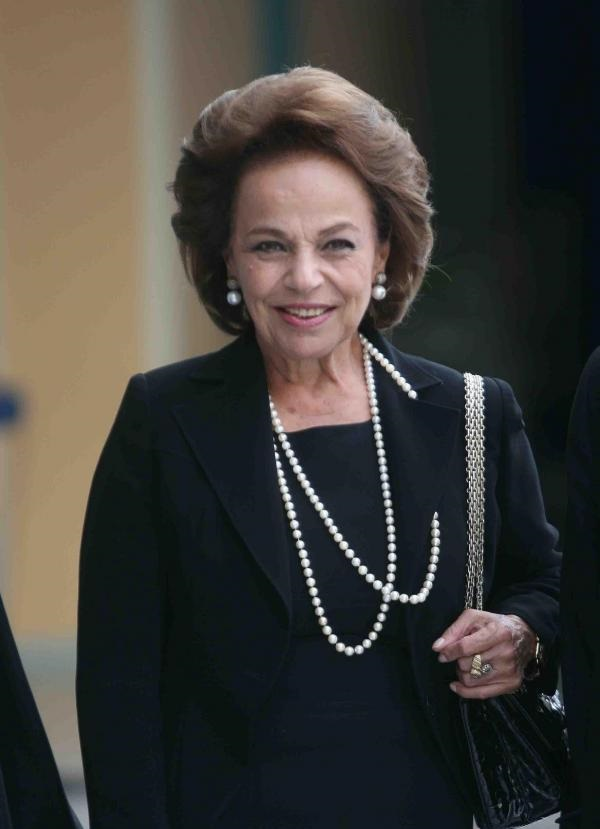
	First party	Second party	Third party
Leader	Fouad Siniora	Walid Jumblatt	Michel Aoun
Party	Future Movement	PSP	FPM
Alliance	March 14	March 14
Leader's seat	None	Chouf	Keserwan
Last election	–	6 seats	New Party
Seats won	36	16	15
Seat change	New	▲10	▲15
	Fourth party	Fifth party	Sixth party
Leader	Hassan Nasrallah	Nabih Berri	Samir Geagea
Party	Hezbollah	Amal Movement	Lebanese Forces
Alliance	March 8	March 8	March 14
Leader's seat	None	Zahrani	None
Last election	10 seats	10 seats	0 seats
Seats won	14	14	6
Seat change	▲4	▲4	▲6
	Seventh party	Eighth party
Leader	Amine Gemayel	Nayla Moawad
Party	Kataeb	IM
Alliance	March 14	March 14
Leader's seat	None	Zgharta
Last election	2 seats	0 seats
Seats won	3	3
Seat change	▲1	▲3
Prime Minister before election
Najib Mikati
Independent
Elected Prime Minister
Fouad Siniora
M14th

General elections were held in Lebanon in May and June 2005 to elect the 128 members of the Parliament of Lebanon. They were the first elections in thirty years without a Syrian military or intelligence presence in Lebanon. These elections were the first in Lebanese history to be won outright by a single electoral block and were also the first to be monitored by the United Nations.

== Results ==
=== First round ===
The first round was held on May 29, 2005 in Beirut. The Rafik Hariri Martyr List, a coalition of Saad Hariri's Current for the Future, the Progressive Socialist Party and other anti-Syrian parties, won all 19 seats. Saad Hariri is the son of former Lebanese Prime Minister Rafik Hariri who was assassinated in February 2005, in a car bombing in Beirut. The coalition left one seat free for a Shiite candidate from Hezbollah.

=== Second round ===
The second round was held on June 5 in South Lebanon and Nabatyeh Governorate. The Resistance and Development Bloc, a joint ticket by the two main Shiite parties Amal and Hezbollah, in addition to Bahiya Al-Hariri, the sister of the assassinated late Prime Minister Rafic Al-Hariri and Oussama Saad from Sidon, won all 23 seats. Official tallies showed the Resistance and Development Bloc receiving more than 80% of the vote.

=== Third round ===
The third round was held on June 12 in Beqaa and Mount Lebanon. In Mount Lebanon the Hariri List won 17 seats, as did the Aoun Alliance, made up of Michel Aoun's Free Patriotic Movement and two smaller parties; Hezbollah won one. In Beqaa, the Resistance and Development Bloc won 11 seats, the Hariri List eight, and the Aoun Alliance four. Aoun re-stamped his authority as a major Christian leader on the political scene.

=== Fourth round ===
The fourth and final round was held on June 20 in North Governorate. The Hariri List won all 28 seats, giving them a total of 72 of the National Assembly's 128 seats.

=== Total ===
Party or alliance		Seats
March 14 Alliance	Future Movement	36
March 14 Alliance	Progressive Socialist Party	16
March 14 Alliance	Lebanese Forces	6
March 14 Alliance	Qornet Shehwan Gathering	6
March 14 Alliance	Tripoli Bloc independents	3
March 14 Alliance	Democratic Renewal (Tripoli Bloc)	1
March 14 Alliance	Democratic Left Movement (Tripoli Bloc)	1
March 14 Alliance	Total	69
March 8 Alliance	Free Patriotic Movement	15
March 8 Alliance	Amal Movement	14
March 8 Alliance	Hezbollah	14
March 8 Alliance	Popular Bloc	4
March 8 Alliance	Armenian Revolutionary Federation	2
March 8 Alliance	Murr Bloc	1
March 8 Alliance	Syrian Social Nationalist Party	2
March 8 Alliance	Others	5
March 8 Alliance	Total	57
Independents		2
Total		128

Summary of the 29 May – 20 June 2005 Lebanese National Assembly election results
Alliances	Seats	Parties	Votes	%	Seats
March 14 Alliance	69	Future Movement (Tayyar Al Mustaqbal)			36
March 14 Alliance	69	Progressive Socialist Party (Hizb al-Taqadummi al-Ishtiraki)			16
March 14 Alliance	69	Lebanese Forces (al-Quwāt al-Lubnāniyya)			6
March 14 Alliance	69	Qornet Shehwan Gathering: Phalangist or Kataeb Party (Hizb al-Kataeb); Independents			6
March 14 Alliance	69	Independents (Tripoli Bloc)			3
March 14 Alliance	69	Democratic Renewal (Tripoli Bloc)			1
March 14 Alliance	69	Democratic Left (Tripoli Bloc)			1
March 8 Alliance	57	Hope Movement (Harakat Amal)			14
March 8 Alliance	57	Hezbollah			14
March 8 Alliance	57	Syrian Social Nationalist Party (al-Hizb al-Qawmi al-souri al ijtima'i)			2
March 8 Alliance	57	Others			5
March 8 Alliance	57	Free Patriotic Movement (Tayyar Al-Watani Al-Horr)			15
March 8 Alliance	57	Skaff Bloc			4
March 8 Alliance	57	Armenian Revolutionary Federafion			2
Murr Bloc			1		
Independents	2	Independents			2
Total					128

== Turnout ==
Turnout was estimated around 46.5%.

== See also ==
- List of members of the 2005–2009 Lebanese Parliament
