= Elias Abou Assi =

Lebanese politician

Elias Abou Assi (Arabic: إلياس أبو عاصي; born 5 July 1950) is a Lebanese politician who was the Secretary General of the National Liberal Party.

== Early life and education ==
Abou Assi was born in the town of Abadiyeh in the Baabda district to a Maronite Christian family in Lebanon. He is a professor of political science in the Saint Joseph University in Beirut.

== Politics ==
He joined the Qornet Chehwane Gathering in 2001 and took part in the Cedar Revolution in 2005 following the assassination of Rafic Hariri. However, his party did not manage to forge an electoral alliance with the other March 14 parties and Abou Assi stood alone for the seat of Maronite deputy for the district of Baabda, facing two powerful lists, the first grouping together March 14 and Hezbollah, the second comprising General Michel Aoun's Free Patriotic Movement and the Lebanese Democratic Party. He was not elected, like all the other candidates of his party.

In 2009, Abou Assi stood for the same position in the 2009 Lebanese general elections supported by the Future Movement and the Progressive Socialist Party but again failed to win against the candidates of the Free Patriotic Movement.
