= Amin Salam =

Lebanese lawyer

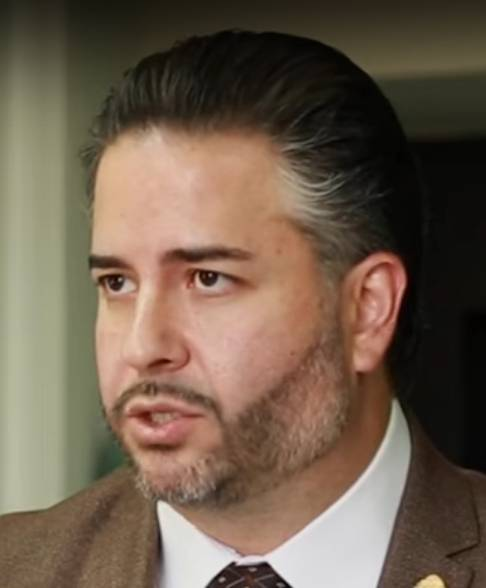
- Salam in 2022

Minister of Economy and Trade
- In office 10 September 2021 – 8 February 2025
- President: Michel Aoun; Joseph Aoun
- Prime Minister: Najib Mikati
- Preceded by: Raoul Nehme
- Succeeded by: Amer Bisat

Personal details
- Born: 1979 (age 46–47) Beirut, Lebanon

Amin Salam (born 1979) is a Lebanese international corporate lawyer, and the former Minister of Economy in Najib Mikati's cabinet.

== Early life and education ==
Salam was born to a Sunni Family in Beirut. He attended Université La Sagesse and George Washington University, earning a law degree.

== Career ==
In June 2025, Salam was arrested while being investigated for alleged falsification, embezzlement of public funds, and blackmailing insurance companies. In December 2025, Lebanon's judiciary approved the release of Salam after six months of detention on bail of around $100,000 and imposed a travel ban on him.

Political offices
Preceded by Raoul Nehme	Ministry of Economy and Trade (Lebanon); 10 September 2021–8 February 2025	Succeeded by Amer Bisat
