= Raoul Nehme =

Lebanese politician

- راؤول نعمة
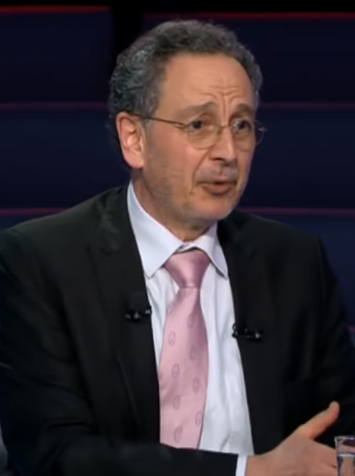

Minister of Economy and Trade
- In office 21 January 2020 – 10 September 2021
- President: Michel Aoun
- Prime Minister: Hassan Diab
- Preceded by: Mansour Bteish
- Succeeded by: Amin Salam

Personal details
- Born: January 20, 1956 (age 70)
- Spouse: Lina Murr Nehmé
- Children: 2

Raoul Nehme (Arabic: راوول نعمة; born January 20, 1956) served as the Lebanese minister of economy and trade from 2020 to 2021.

== Life ==
Nehme went to school at Collège Notre Dame de Jamhour and studied in France at the Ecole Polytechnique (engineering with a major in economics) and Mines ParisTech (engineering with a major in scientific management). He was a member of the Guardians of the Cedar. He is a part of the Greek-Catholic community.

== Career ==
In January 2020, Nehme was appointed minister of economy and trade by Prime Minister Hassan Diab. He joined the government as President's nominee, though he is himself independent.

Prior to his appointment in the government, Nehme worked in the banking industry. He has experience handling several establishments in crisis:

- BLC bank (Lebanon) board member (2008–2015) and general manager (2010-2015), after it was put in receivership by the BDL due to mismanagement
- T-bank (Turkey) chairman of the board, was brought in after the latter was severely affected by the economic crisis.
- AstroBank (Cyprus) chairman of the executive committee (2017–present). He was also a board member of USB bank, a predecessor entity to AstroBank.
- Bankmed (Lebanon) executive general manager (June 2018 – Jan 2020).

Nehme is the president and co-founder of NGO Jouzour Lebanon (meaning "roots of Lebanon"), an environmental NGO dedicated to reforestation.

== Minister of Economy ==
Nehme's nomination as minister of economy came as Lebanon was experiencing a double political and economic crisis that resulted in a default on March 9, 2020. The general situation was further complicated by the coincident COVID-19 pandemic. As minister of economy, Nehme introduced measures to protect the consumer by limiting abusive price increases, banning the exportation of critical medical equipment and implementing measures to mitigate the propagation of the SARS-CoV-2.

Political offices
Preceded by Mansour Bteich	Ministry of Economy and Trade (Lebanon); 21 January 2020 – 10 September 2021	Succeeded by Amin Salam
