= Michel Moawad =

Lebanese politician

- ميشال معوض
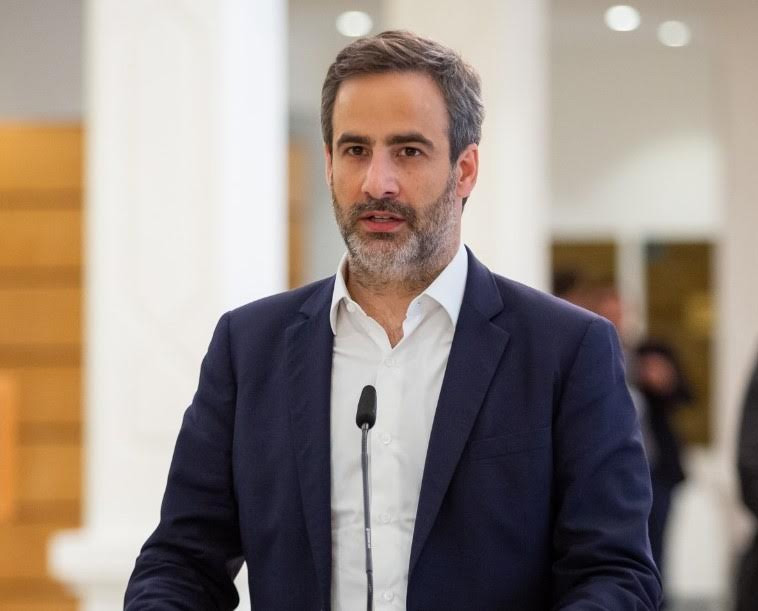
- Moawad in 2021

Member of the Lebanese Parliament
- Incumbent
- Assumed office 6 May 2018
- Constituency: Zgharta (2018, 2022)

Personal details
- Born: 4 June 1972 (age 53) Beirut, Lebanon
- Party: Independence Movement
- Other political affiliations: Renewal Bloc
- Spouse: Marielle Kosremelli
- Children: 4
- Parent(s): René Moawad; Nayla Moawad

Michel Moawad (Arabic: ميشال معوض; born 4 June 1972) is a Lebanese politician. He is a member of the Renewal Bloc in the Lebanese Parliament representing the Zgharta District. Since his election to Parliament, he has been also elected as a member of the parliamentary Finance and Budget Committee and is currently the executive director of the René Moawad Foundation.

== Early life and education ==
Michel Moawad was born on 4 June 1972, in Lebanon. He is the son of the former President of the Lebanese Republic, René Moawad.

Moawad attended school at the Collège Notre Dame de Jamhour, graduating in 1990 and obtaining the French Baccalaureate with honors. He then attended the Lycée privé Sainte-Geneviève Preparatory School for Grandes écoles in Versailles and graduated from the École supérieure de commerce de Paris (ESCP). He also obtained a master's degree in Public Law from the Sorbonne University in Paris.

== Politics ==
=== Independence Movement ===
Michel Moawad is the founder and president of the Independence Movement, a sovereigntist, reformist, secular and socio-liberal political party, launched in 2005. The Independence Movement began as a grassroots initiative as part of the Cedar Revolution, before it evolved into a structured political organization. In addition, Moawad was a member of the 14 March Coalition Leadership, as well as an active participant of the 2005 Cedar Revolution and key precursor movements, including the Qornet Shehwan Gathering and Bristol Gathering.

=== 2005 Cedar Revolution and key precursor movements ===
Moawad was actively involved in several key movements that paved the way towards the 2005 Cedar Revolution. He was a founding member of the Qornet Shehwan Gathering, a political opposition grouping formed in 2001, which was the primary opposition force to the Syrian hegemony in Lebanon. The group gathered key Christian figures, including Lebanese Minister Pierre Amine Gemayel, and Members of Parliament Gebran Tueni and Antoine Ghanem, all of which were assassinated for their political opposition. Moreover, Moawad was a founding member of the Bristol Gathering in 2005, the largest multi-sectarian opposition bloc in the history of Lebanon at the time, formed following the illegal extension of former Lebanese President Emile Lahoud's term imposed by the Syrian government. Following the 2005 Cedar Revolution, Moawad joined the leadership of the 14 March Alliance, and participated in the Doha Conference of May 2008 that came as a result of 7 May events that saw Hezbollah militarily invade the capital and parts of the Chouf area. The conference produced the Doha Agreement to end an 18-month-long political crisis.

=== In parliament ===
Moawad ran as a candidate for the 2009 Lebanese parliamentary elections with the Lebanese Forces and other 14 March political parties attaining 47% of the vote in the Zgharta–Zawye district, losing against the Marada Movement led by Suleiman Frangieh. In 2013, the Parliamentary Elections were postponed to 2018, and Moawad underwent various attempts to politically ally with several parties in the hope to limit his opponents growing public influence, which were finally represented in the 2018 Elections where Moawad came in 2nd in Zgharta District, and his party, the Independence Movement, cemented itself as the 4th largest power in the North 3 electoral sector, allied with The Free Patriotic Movement. As an MP, Moawad was a member of the Parliamentary Finance and Budget Committee, and played a pivotal role in advocating reforms, fighting corruption, and exposing the illegal partisan employment in the public sector.

Moawad was part of the FPM bloc until late 2019 when he was seen as an independent MP when he named Nawaf Salam unlike the rest of the bloc that named Hassan Diab.

Moawad resigned from parliament in protest following the Beirut explosion on 4 August 2020, and is today a leading figure and founding member of the Lebanese Opposition Front.

In 2022, the Independence Movement allied with the Kataeb Party, the son of the ex-minister and ex-parliament member Boutros Harb and other Anti-Hezbollah independents to form a list called 'Shamal Al Mouwajaha' to bring down Gebran Bassil and Sleiman Frengieh's presence in the North III electoral districts.

=== 2022 presidential candidacy ===
In 2022, Moawad declared his candidacy for the Lebanese presidential elections to succeed President Michel Aoun, whose 6-year term was ended on 31 October 2022.

== Civic engagement ==
Moawad's civic involvement, which started in 1997 with his struggle to pressure the government to organize municipal elections for the first time since 1964 through the "Baladi, Baldati, Baladiyati" Campaign, further includes supporting employment and entrepreneurship via initiatives such as FORAS: Fostering Entrepreneurship and Employment in North Lebanon and the Business Incubation Association in Tripoli (BIAT), as well as several social initiatives to protect and ameliorate the conditions of underprivileged populations in Lebanon.

Moawad is a founding member and current executive director of the René Moawad Foundation (RMF). RMF is an NGO with programs across Lebanon in partnership with international donors including USAID, the UN and all its organs, the EU, the Kingdom of the Netherlands, the German GIZ and many others. Its mission is to promote social, economic, and rural development in Lebanon and contribute to building a responsible civil society that promotes democratic values, social justice, pluralism, and moderation. It works in five sectors: Education and Human Development, Health and Social Care, Economic Development, Agriculture and Rural Development, and Local Authorities and Decentralization. RMF's budget for 2020 was $19.571M, and its programs reached 530,630 beneficiaries. Furthermore, RMF has a US based sister NGO, which Moawad participated in founding.

Moawad is also a board member of the Maronite Foundation in the World.

== Personal life ==
Moawad is married to Marielle Kosremelli and is a father of 4 children.

Party political offices
| Preceded by | President of the Independence Movement; 2005–present | Succeeded by Incumbent |
