= Philippe Ziade (businessman) =

Lebanese-American entrepreneur (born 1976)

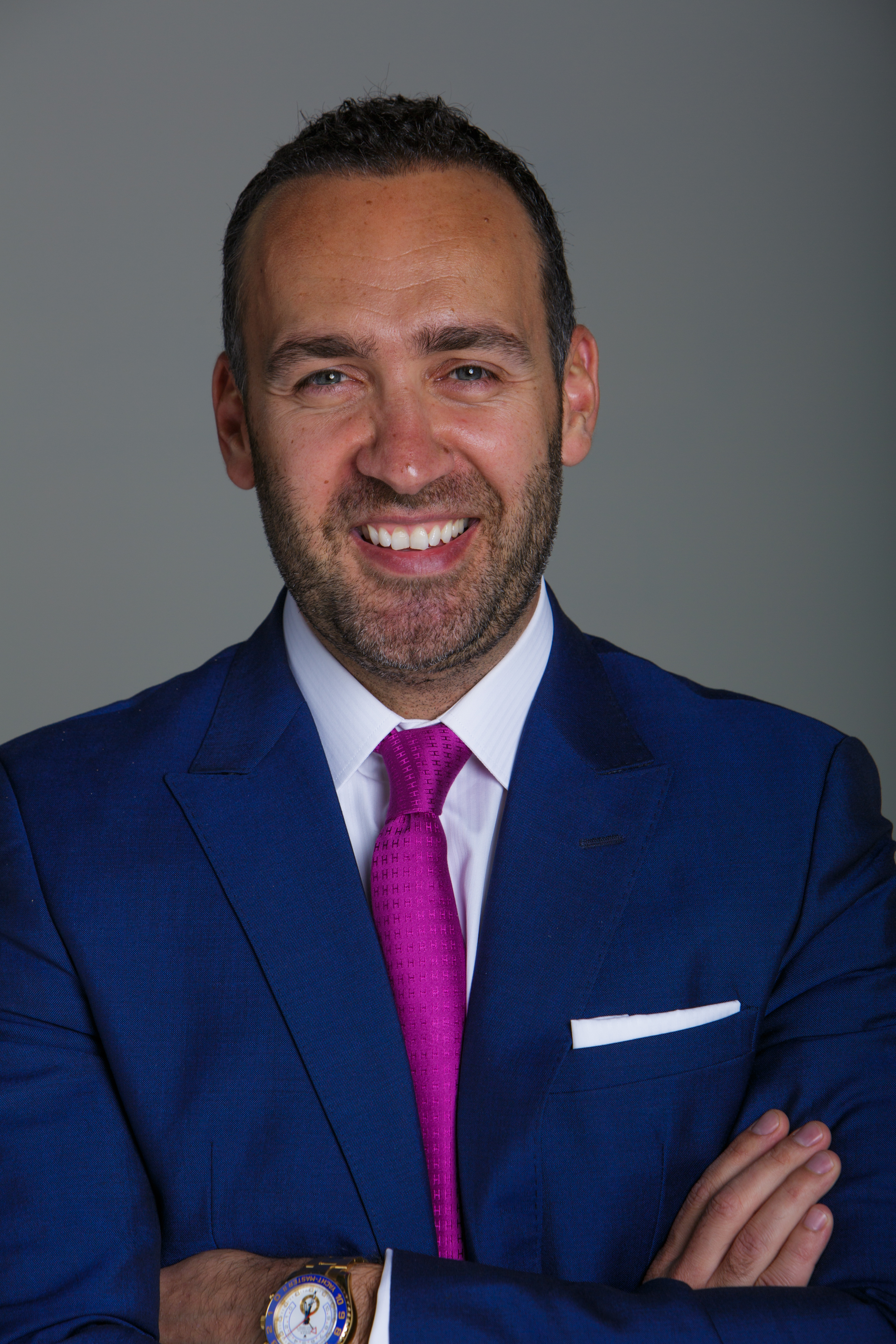
- Born: 13 April 1976 (age 50); Herharaya el Qattine, Kesrwan district, Lebanon
- Education: University of Nevada, Las Vegas
- Occupations: investor; entrepreneur
- Years active: 1997–present
- Known for: Founder and Chairman of Las-Vegas based Growth Holdings, Honorary Consul of Lebanon in Nevada
- Title: Chairman and founder of Growth Holdings; Honorary Consul of Lebanon in Nevada

Philippe Khalil Ziade (Arabic: فيليب خليل زياده; born April 13, 1976) is a Lebanese-American entrepreneur and the honorary consul of Lebanon in Nevada. He is the founder and chairman of Las-Vegas based Growth Holdings. Ziade is engaged in Lebanese politics and expat affairs.

Philippe Ziade was born in Herharaya al-Qattine in Lebanon and immigrated to the US in 1998. He settled in Las Vegas where he completed a double major in Mechanical and civil engineering. During the 2008 financial crisis, Ziade acquired, remolded, and sold distressed properties. His parent firm, Growth Holdings, manages a portfolio of 24 subsidiary companies operating in the US, Europe, Japan and the Middle East. Given his background in green energy solutions, he was nominated to the office of Energy Minister in Lebanon. Ziade refused due to regional political developments that would have had impeded the functioning of Hassan Diab's proposed technocratic cabinet.

Ziade was appointed Honorary Consul of Lebanon in Nevada by President Michael Aoun. He was recognized for his innovation as a chief executive, and for supporting the Lebanese youth. His holding company is engaged with a number of Lebanese universities to mentor and hire graduates. Ziade was targeted by social media campaigns around the time of his nomination for the Lebanese Minister of Energy office.

== Early life and studies ==
Ziade was born to Nayla and Khalil Ziade on 13 April 1976 in Herharaya al-Qattine in the Keserwan District in Lebanon. In 1998, he immigrated to the United States and settled in Las Vegas, where his paternal uncle was residing, to pursue a dual degree in Mechanical and civil engineering at the University of Nevada in Las Vegas.

== Career ==
Ziade started a building stone manufacturing enterprise in 1997. Six months into his university studies, he secured a contract to supply marble imported from Lebanon to the Palms Casino Resort in Las Vegas.

After his graduation in 2000, Ziade became a real estate investor and developer. During the 2008 financial crisis, he sold his assets, but he later capitalized on the post-crash business opportunities by buying, remodeling, and selling distressed properties. Ziade started Growth Holdings in Las Vegas in 2008 which grew to a become a conglomerate of 24 companies operating in construction, technology, hospitality, education and entertainment. His venture picked up and became the largest real estate business by transaction volume in Nevada with offices in Europe, Japan, and the Middle East. In response to ecological concerns, Ziade partnered with Tesla to advocate for, and develop environmentally sustainable housing with emphasis on efficient use of preexisting technologies. Ziade businesses expanded to provide green, energy and financially efficient hospitality services; his subsidiary companies develop upscale, Tesla technology-powered housing.

In 2019, Ziade was appointed Honorary Consul of Lebanon in Nevada by Lebanese President Michel Aoun.

== Lebanese public energy sector ==
Ziade first showed interest in the reform of the Lebanese energy sector in 2017. He had proposed using new technology, net metering, and selling electricity back to the grid to manage energy waste and provide self-sustaining and durable power sources to the Lebanese Parliament before his nomination to the office of Energy minister but his proposal was turned down. Alternative procedures were discussed with the Lebanese government targeting willing private individuals, but these were met with legislative hurdles and an inert parliament assembly.

== Political views and involvement ==
Khalil, Philippe's father, is a long-time supporter of the Phalangist party. Philippe is an outspoken critic of Lebanese political stalemate; he gained the support of the Aounist elite, namely President Aoun and the president of the Free Patriotic Movement and then-Minister of foreign affairs and Emigrants Gebran Bassil with whom he developed close ties. In January 2020 Ziade was nominated for Minister of Energy and Water in the cabinet of then-prime minister-designate Hassan Diab; he maintains that he was nominated by Sayed Fenianos and a member of the Harvard University board who is in communication with Diab. The nomination of Ziade to the office is based on his experience with renewable and sustainable energy; his reform agenda centered on cutting energy waste and shifting from fossil fuel energy to self-powered households and businesses using new renewable energy technology such as Tesla's Powerwall. During a televised interview the influential Cardinal Bechara al-Rahi, the Maronite Patriarch of Antioch, and head of the Maronite Church openly supported the nomination of Philippe. Ziade declined the nomination following the liquidation of Qasem Soleimani, a high-ranking Iranian military commander, which according to him would impose regional political interference in the internal Lebanese politics while he was expecting to be part of Diab's technocratic cabinet. Ziade was also the subject of a media smearing campaign involving the circulation of his photos in a state of inebriety during a bachelor party when he was 22 years of age. He issued a press release announcing that his refusal of the cabinet position was on grounds not related to the leaked photos. Ziade was unapologetic during a televised interview with the Lebanese journalist Marcel Ghanem and justified his behavior as a normal aspect of integration in occidental culture.

In the wake of the 2019–2021 Lebanese protests Ziade called for political reform beginning with early parliamentary elections that introduce young members of parliament, and the formation of a technocratic cabinet. Although he declared his support for the revolutionary movement, Ziade said that he does not ascribe to the protestors' motto "Ash-shab yurid isqat an-nizam" [the people want to take down the regime]. He justified his position by saying that Lebanon is a faulty parliamentary democracy in need of reform. Ziade strongly advocates a civil state and the separation of powers. In the aftermath of the presidential vacuum, Maronite Patriarch Beshara al-Rahi sent a list of presidential candidates to Speaker of the Parliament Nabih Berri, and the leadership of Hezbollah and the Progressive Socialist Party in April 2023. Ziade was on the list as a candidate proposed in a settlement effort through indirect dialogue between the Lebanese Forces and the Free Patriotic Movement.

== Activism and philanthropy ==
In 2014, Ziade launched the "Invest To Stay" program in Los Angeles, which aims to create viable investment opportunities for sustainable and financial growth to stimulate the Lebanese economy. Ziade supports youth empowerment, especially in the diaspora. He substantiated his support through investment in human resources and creativity, sponsoring students and offering career opportunities for renewable energy diploma graduates regardless of their political background. He sponsored the partnership between the Lebanese Holy Spirit University of Kaslik and RENAC, one of the leading international providers of education and training in the fields of renewable energy and energy efficiency. Ziade also partnered with the Lebanese Notre Dame University–Louaize to develop renewable energy programs and to offer job and mentoring opportunities in his tech firms. Ziade is a proponent of the protection of intellectual rights in Lebanon. In 2018, he was a speaker and co-organizer with YouTube and the Lebanese Ministry of Economy and Trade of a music and intellectual property protection workshop held in Beirut. Ziade participated in the 2016 In Defense of Christians (IDC) conference, he also put his private jet in the service of the Maronite Patriarchate in 2018 for the transport of the relics of Saint Marina from the Church of Santa Maria Formosa in Venice, Italy to Lebanon. Philippe is a regular speaker at the Lebanese Diaspora Energy (LDE) conferences which aim to establish investment and business opportunities between the diaspora and Lebanese businesses. In the aftermath of the 2020 Beirut explosion, hundreds of families affected by the disaster received aid from the Ziade Foundation. A considerable number of Beirut residences were also rebuilt by the foundation.

== Recognition ==
On his 2017 pastoral US tour, Patriarch Moran Mor Bechara Boutros al-Rahi awarded Ziade with the Saint Maron Medal in recognition of his investment in the education of the Lebanese youth. Ziade was awarded the Burj Innovative CEO Award of the Year award for innovation On 31 October 2019 from the Dubai-based Chief Executive Officer Clubs Network.

== Criticism ==
In 2019–2020, Philippe Ziade was criticized for his close ties with then-Minister of foreign affairs and Emigrants Gebran Bassil who is regarded by some Lebanese opposition movements as a corrupt political figure. He responded to the criticism by stating that his relationship with Bassil is that of an active foreign minister with a successful expatriate; he further went on to say that Bassil was not the one who nominated him for the office of Minister of Energy.

== Personal life ==
Philippe describes himself as a devout Christian with close ties with his family. Philippe has two children, living between the US and Lebanon.
