= Violette Khairallah Safadi =

Lebanese TV anchor

Violette Khairallah
- فيوليت خيرالله
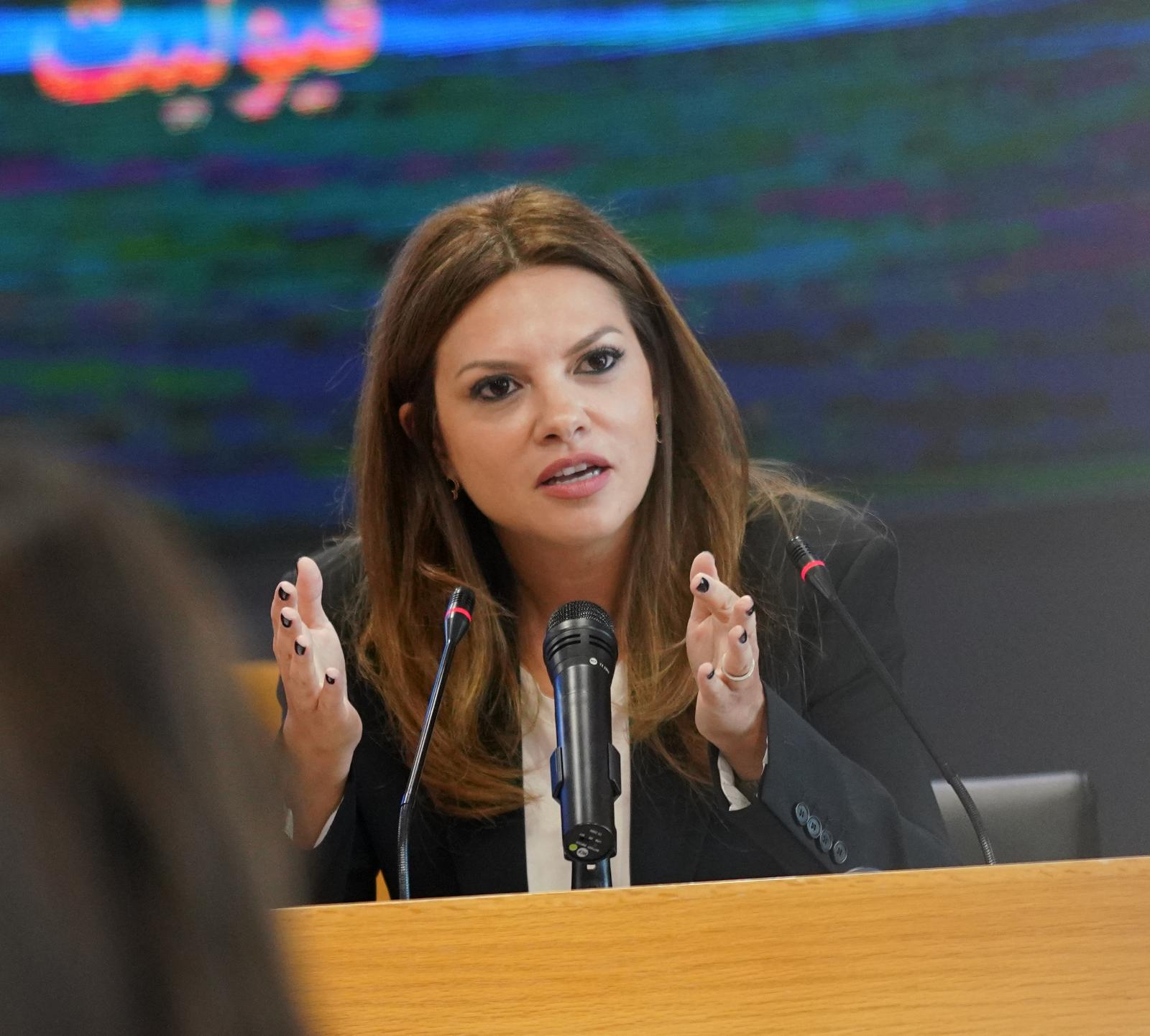
- Violette Khairallah in 2019
- Born: 20 September 1981 (age 44); Bhamdoun, Lebanon
- Occupations: Politician, television personality, journalist
- Years active: 2001–present

Violette Khairallah (Arabic: (فيوليت خيرالله is a former Lebanese politician, television personality and social activist. She is a former Minister of State for Economic Empowerment of Women and Youth in the cabinet led by H.E. Saad Hariri, Former Prime Minister of the Lebanese Republic.

== Career ==
Prior to her governmental appointment in 2019, Khairallah served as the Executive Director of the Safadi Group Holding where she managed and oversaw work related to several companies involved in different sectors, including aviation, real estate, and trade. Between 2000 and 2011, Khairallah worked as a TV presenter at the Lebanese Broadcasting Corporation (LBC), and then as a news anchor and political host at (MTV).

Khairallah's activities in the nonprofit sector focus on improving the livelihoods of vulnerable populations through her capacity as president of the Safadi Cultural Foundation and as vice-president of Safadi Foundation. These development-focused organizations focus on creating economic opportunities, women's empowerment and education and training. In conjunction, she has expanded the outreach of cultural events of the Safadi Cultural Center, which she currently heads, to be more inclusive of local demographics including age, gender, and ethnicity.

Khairallah is an International Council Member of Belfer Center for Science and International Affairs, a member of the Women Leadership Board at Harvard Kennedy School, a member of Board of Trustees at Notre Dame University – Louaize, a board member of the Human rights Center at Beirut Arab University, and Vice President of the Autism Awareness Association in Lebanon.

Khairallah is married to former Lebanese cabinet minister Mohammad Safadi.

== Education ==
Khairallah holds an undergraduate degree in International Business Management from Notre Dame University Louaize (2004) and an MA in International Security from King's College, London. In addition, she holds an Executive Certificate in Public Leadership at Harvard Kennedy School of Government (2019).
