= Amer Bisat =

Lebanese businessman, professor, and politician

- عامر البساط
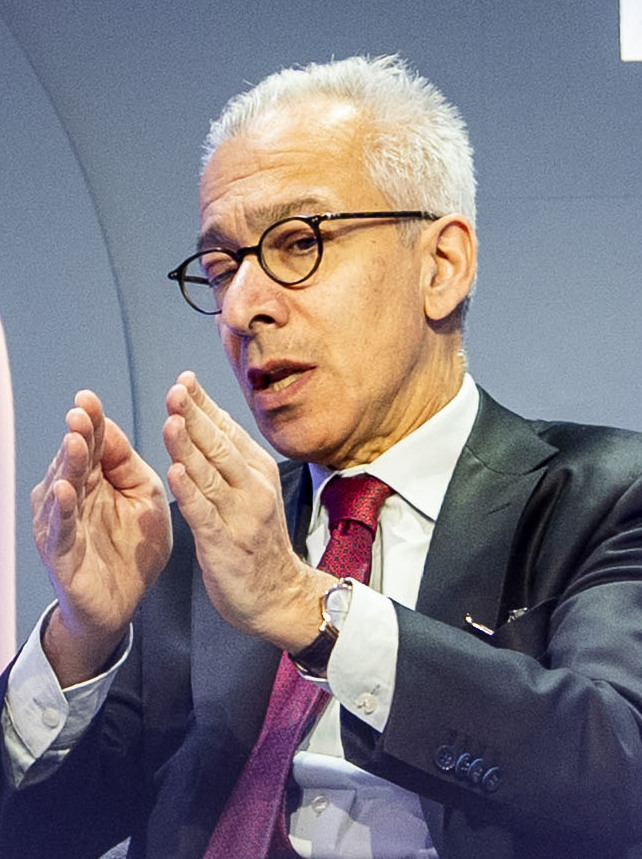
- Bisat in 2026

Minister of Economy and Trade
- Incumbent
- Assumed office 8 February 2025
- President: Joseph Aoun
- Prime Minister: Nawaf Salam
- Preceded by: Amin Salam

Personal details
- Born: Lebanon
- Party: Independent
- Education: Columbia University and American University of Beirut
- Occupation: Businessman, Professor, Politician
- Cabinet: Nawaf Salam cabinet

Amer Bisat (Arabic: عامر البساط) is a Lebanese businessman, academic, and politician, currently serving as the Minister of Economy and Trade in the cabinet of Prime Minister Nawaf Salam, formed on 8 February 2025. Bisat is also a professor, author, and trustee of several cultural and art institutions.

== Career ==
=== Academic and professional background ===
Until his appointment as Lebanese Minister of Economy, Amer Bisat was the Global Head of Emerging Markets Debt at BlackRock. Before that, he had held senior portfolio management roles at Morgan Stanley and UBS. In the 1990s, he served as a senior economist at the International Monetary Fund where he helped negotiate high profile programs with Russia, Ukraine and Egypt. Bisat taught graduate-level economics courses at Columbia University in New York. His academic work focuses on globalization, economic growth, and financial sector development. He has co-authored academic and policy papers on these topics, contributing to both scholarly and practical discussions on economic policy.

Bisat is a member of the Council on Foreign Relations, a prominent think tank specializing in U.S. foreign policy and international affairs. He also served as the Chairman of the Arab Banking Association of North American (ABANA).

=== Political career ===
In February 2025, Bisat was appointed Lebanon's Minister of Economy and Trade in the government of Prime Minister Nawaf Salam. His appointment came amid Lebanon's ongoing economic crisis, with expectations that his expertise in economics and globalization would help steer the country toward recovery.

== Publications ==
Bisat co-edited the book Covering Globalization: A Handbook for Reporters with Anya Schiffrin, published by Columbia University Press in 2004. The book serves as a guide for journalists reporting on the complexities of globalization, offering insights into economic, political, and cultural dimensions of the phenomenon.

== Personal life ==
Bisat is a Sunni Muslim and has been involved in various cultural and art institutions as a trustee. His contributions to the arts and culture sector reflect his commitment to fostering creativity and intellectual growth in Lebanon and beyond.

== See also ==
- Economy of Lebanon
- Cabinet of Nawaf Salam
- Council on Foreign Relations
