= Mohammad Safadi =

Lebanese businessman and politician (born 1944)

- محمد الصفدي

Minister of Finance
- In office 13 June 2011 – February 2014
- Prime Minister: Najib Mikati
- Preceded by: Raya Haffar El Hassan
- Succeeded by: Ali Hassan Khalil

Minister of Economy and Trade
- In office 22 July 2008 – 13 June 2011
- Prime Minister: Fouad Siniora; Saad Hariri
- Preceded by: Sami Haddad
- Succeeded by: Nicolas Nahas

Personal details
- Born: Mohammad Ahmed Safadi; 28 March 1944 (age 82) Tripoli, Lebanon
- Party: Tripoli Bloc
- Children: 2
- Education: American University of Beirut
- Awards: German Order of Merit

Mohammad Safadi (Arabic: محمد الصفدي; born 28 March 1944) is a Lebanese businessman who served as minister of finance under Najib Mikati between 2011 and 2014. He was also the minister of economy and trade from 2008 to 2011.

== Early life and education ==
Safadi was born in Tripoli, Lebanon, on 28 March 1944 to Sunni family. He is the son of Ahmed Safadi. His family are businesspeople, running their own firm in Tripoli.

Safadi is a graduate of the American University of Beirut where he received a bachelor's degree in business administration in February 1968.

== Business career ==
Safadi began his career in the private sector in Lebanon in 1969. In 1975 when the civil war broke out in Lebanon, he began to invest in Saudi Arabia. Therefore, he has many business investments in Saudi Arabia most of which included the construction of residential compounds.

Safadi expanded his business across the Arab world and into Europe in Saudi Arabia. He also worked as business manager in London for Prince Turki bin Nasser, a member of House of Saud. Safadi established Safadi Group Holding in Lebanon in the 1990s.

== Political career ==
Safadi was first elected to the Lebanese Parliament in 2000 as part of the Tripoli bloc. He served as the minister of public works and transport from 19 July 2005 to July 2008. Safadi also served as acting energy and water minister in 2007 and in 2008. Next, he was appointed minister of economy and trade on 11 July 2008 to the cabinet headed by Fouad Siniora. He was reelected member of parliament in the 2009 elections on the list of the March 14 alliance. Safadi was appointed minister of economy and trade to the cabinet of Saad Hariri on 9 November 2009, and his tenure lasted until June 2011.

Safadi did not support for Saad Hariri in the 2011 cabinet formation talks with Lebanese President Michel Suleiman. Instead, he voted for Najib Mikati during cabinet formation consultations in January 2011. Therefore, he broke with his March 14 allies and sided with the Hezbollah-led March 8 coalition along with Mikati. Safadi became an ally of Mikati after this event.

Safadi served as the minister of finance from 13 June 2011 to February 2014 in the cabinet led by Prime Minister Najib Mikati. Within the cabinet, Safadi was part of the group appointed by the Prime Minister and an independent or non-affiliated minister in the Mikati's cabinet. In October 2012, As Safir reported that Safadi would not participate in the 2013 parliamentary elections in Tripoli possibly due to health concerns.

Safadi chairs the steering committee of the Middle East Regional Technical Assistance Committee (METAC) of the International Monetary Fund. He was also the head of the Lebanese-German Parliamentary Friendship Committee and a member of the Economy Commission at the Parliament.

Safadi's term as finance minister ended in February 2014, when Ali Hassan Khalil was appointed to the post.

In November 2019, amidst the 2019–20 Lebanese protests, Safadi was tapped as the next prime minister of Lebanon, to succeed Saad Hariri. Safadi withdrew his candidacy on 16 November, stating that it would have been difficult to form a harmonious cabinet. His withdrawal followed days of widespread nationwide protests, some of which turned violent, underscoring the deep public outrage triggered by his appointment.

=== Controversy ===
Safadi has been associated with corrupt government officials and criticized for benefiting from Lebanon’s entrenched political and financial system.

Deals through offshore companies internationally, as well as his investments in Beirut’s yacht club, have been questioned for alleged corruption and money laundering.

The Guardian reported that Safadi was involved in Al Yamama arms deal through an anonymous offshore company, Poseidon. The company was allegedly used to transfer money to Safadi, who was working for Prince Turki bin Nasser, Saudi royal and an air force officer at that time.

He was the subject of an investigation in the United Kingdom regarding his suspected involvement in arms trade, specifically in relation to international defense contracts.

Concerns over his role in enabling Lebanese Hezbollah militia groups' operations were also raised by investigations and accusations made against him while he was Minister of Transportation.

Additionally, Safadi had reportedly been under scrutiny by the UK Serious Fraud Office as early as 2005, further deepening concerns over Safadi’s international financial activities.

== Personal life ==
On 5 October 2015, Safadi married Violette Khaïrallah. He has two children from a previous marriage. His son, Ramzi, died in a car crash in England on 10 March 2008.

Safadi established a foundation entitled the Safadi Foundation in 2000. It provides health, educational, and social services.

=== Awards ===
Safadi is the recipient of the Order of Merit from Germany.

Political offices
Preceded by Raya Haffar Al Hassan	Minister of Finance; 2011–2014	Succeeded by Ali Hassan Khalil

Political offices
Preceded by Sami Haddad	Minister of Economy and Trade; 2008–2011	Succeeded by Nicolas Nahas
