= Samir Frangieh =

Lebanese journalist and politician (1945–2017)

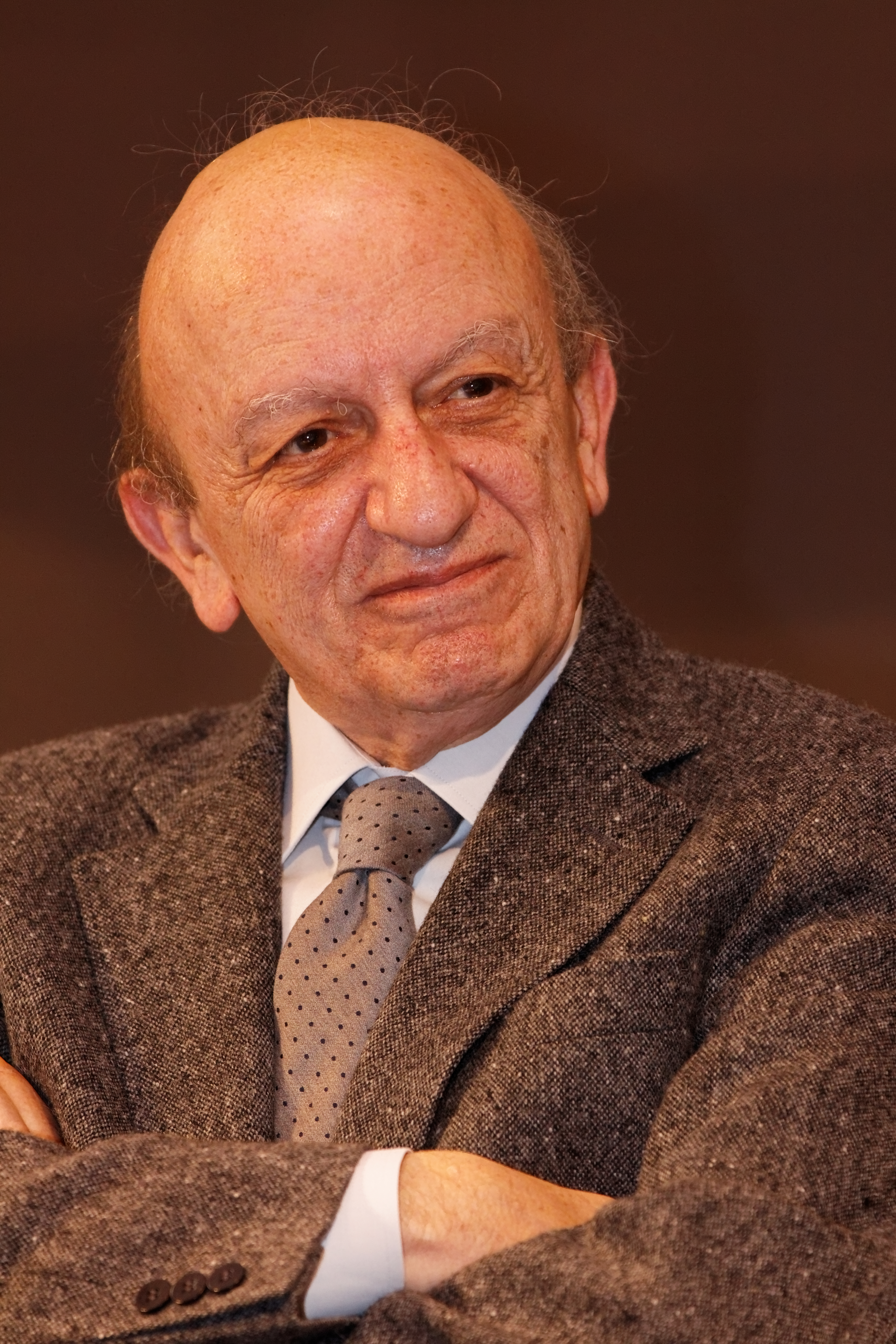
- Frangieh in 2012
- Born: Samir Hamid Frangieh; 4 December 1945; Zgharta, Lebanon
- Died: 11 April 2017 (aged 71); Beirut, Lebanon
- Occupations: Journalist; Author
- Known for: 14 March alliance
- Spouse: Anne Mourani
- Children: 2
- Father: Hamid Frangieh

Samir Frangieh (4 December 1945 – 11 April 2017) was a Lebanese politician, member of the Lebanese Parliament and a leftist intellectual. He was from the Frangieh family, one of the well-known political families of Lebanon.

== Early life ==
Frangieh was born in Zgharta on 4 December 1945. He hailed from an old political family, Frangieh family. He was the son of Hamid Kabalan Frangieh and Lamia Michel (née Raffoul). Hamid Frangieh was a lawyer and a businessman. He was the elder brother of Suleiman Frangieh who was the President of Lebanon in the period 1970-1976. Therefore, Tony Frangieh and Samir Frangieh were cousins.

== Career, activities and views ==
Frangieh was a leading journalist. He contributed to many leading publications, including L'Orient (1970), L'Orient-Le Jour (1971–1975), Le Monde diplomatique, Libération, An Nahar, As Safir and Financial Times. He also published articles in academic journals such as Journal of Palestine Studies.

Frangieh joined the Lebanese Communist Party and left it in 1967. He was the founder of the Lebanese Communist Union which was disestablished in 1970. He was also a member of the National Movement Center. During the term of President Émile Lahoud, Frangieh was one of the opposition leaders, who tried to challenge close allies of the president. The opposition group was also led by Rafik Hariri and Walid Jumblatt. Frangieh was a political ally of Jumblatt.

Frangieh was also one of the founders of the Qornet Shehwan Gathering. He supported the implementation of the Taif accords and the withdrawal of Syrian troops from Lebanon. In addition, he was part of the 14 March Alliance and a member of its general secretariat. He was the author of "Beirut manifesto" that was published in Le Monde on 22 June 2004. The manifesto, which was signed by Lebanese intellectuals and eminent public figures, challenged the dominance of Syria in Lebanon.

In the 2005 general elections, Frangieh became a member of the Lebanese Parliament, representing Zgharta. However, in the general elections of 2009, Frangieh was not included in the election list of the March 14 alliance.

Frangieh was elected president of the March 14 national council in June 2015 against Fawzi Ferri.

== Personal life and death ==
Frangieh was married to Anne Mourani with whom he had two children. He was the author of The Journey to the Extreme of Violence that was published in 2011. He died on 11 April 2017 in Beirut's Hotel Dieu Hospital.
