= Tripoli Bloc =

Tripoli Bloc التكتل الطرابلسي
- Leader: Mohammad Safadi
- Founded: 1960s
- Headquarters: Tripoli, Lebanon
- Ideology: Liberalism
- Political position: Centre
- National affiliation: March 14 Alliance
- Parliament of Lebanon (2005): 5 / 128
- Cabinet of Lebanon: 0 / 30

The Tripoli Bloc has been one of the political blocs present in the Lebanese Parliament. In 1961, the bloc had four members in the parliament. All members of the bloc are deputies from Tripoli (Lebanon). At the elections in June 2005, the bloc was part of the March 14 Alliance and the Rafik Hariri Martyr List that won the elections. It remained committed to the basic premises of the March 14 Alliance in 2008.

== Members ==
- Mohammad Safadi
- Qassem Abdulaziz
- Maurice Fadel
