= Antoine Haddad =

Lebanese academic and activist (born 1954)

Antoine Haddad (Arabic: أنطوان حداد; born 1954, Ain Dara, Lebanon) is an academic, consultant, and social and political activist.

After 40 years of experience in university teaching and scientific research, during which he held several positions at the Lebanese University and elsewhere, Dr. Antoine Haddad has been appointed since July 2019 as vice president of the newly established Saint George University of Beirut, which aspires to create a progressive higher learning model centered on medical sciences and health care, and build on the century-long experience of Saint George Hospital University Medical Center.

In parallel to teaching and research, Haddad worked as a consultant in various fields such as oil and energy, social and economic policies, refugees, issues of dialogue and social integration, governance and transparency, and public policy design, in his personal capacity or as CEO of "Haddad Business and Consulting" (from 2014 to 2019), and previously as partner-in-charge of "Dar al Tanmiya" and as a free-lance expert at the Economic and Social Commission for Western Asia of the United Nations, UN-ESCWA, the United Nations Development Program (UNDP) and the International Labor Organization (ILO).

Between 1983 and 1992, Haddad accumulated an extensive experience in the fields of communication and media, first as Editor-in-Chief of “Al-Iilm wa Teknoligia”, a monthly in Arabic specialized in Science, Technology and Development, then as economic editor at Agence France Presse's Beirut and Bahrein offices and in the foreign desk of An-Nahar newspaper, then as acting director of the Visnews's Beirut office.

At the political level, Dr. Haddad is a founding member of the Democratic Renewal Movement, of which he was secretary general then vice president until 2019. DRM founding president is Nassib Lahoud (1944- 2012), who was former ambassador to Washington, member of the Parliament, Minister, and presidential candidate on behalf of March 14 Alliance in 2007. Dr. Haddad was the director of Nassib Lahoud's presidential campaign. Up until 2009, he also represented DRM in the March 14 Alliance. In 2018, Haddad announced his candidacy for the parliamentary elections for the Aley-Chouf district "to make the voice of reformist and civic currents heard”, before announcing his withdrawal due to the failure of these currents to form a unified electoral front.

Through the 1990s, Dr. Haddad contributed to the empowering of civil society in Lebanon and to several advocacy campaigns. In 1996 he co-founded the Lebanese Association of Democratic Elections, a non-partisan association aiming to promote electoral reform, defend democratic standards and monitor elections. He is also member of the launching committee of the Civil Campaign for Municipal Elections in 1997. The campaign led the government one year later to hold the first local elections since 1963. Haddad participated as well in launching a number of pro-environment campaigns, most recently the campaign against the establishment of a cement factory in Ain Dara, his hometown.

Haddad is a regular speaker on local and foreign media. He has several publications, mainly a book on “Poverty in Lebanon” published by ESCWA in 1996, another on “Industry of Petrolem and Derivatives” (1989), and also another on “Involvement of Lebanon in the Syria War” (2014). Dr Haddad is the editor of “Democracy and Poverty in the Arab World” by IDEA (Stockholm, Sweden) in 2001, and the co-author of the “National Human Development Reports” by UNDP and the Lebanese Ministry of Social Affairs in 1997 and 2002; co-author of “Mapping of Living Conditions in Lebanon” in 1998 and 2007. He supervised or co-supervised the organization of several regional conferences and dialogue and conflict resolution seminars, including the "Syria Aid Forum for Emergency and Reconstruction" (2016), and seminars on “A Unified Lebanese Vision for the Palestinian Refugees Affairs In Lebanon” (2016), “Roadmap for a Civic State in Lebanon: Managing Diversity within Democracy” (2017), “National Dialogue for Building Citizenship and Managing Diversity in Iraq” (2018).

Haddad holds a PhD in Industrial Chemistry from Paris-6 University (Universite Pierre et Marie Curie), where he also attended MSc courses in Economics of Energy.
