= Sami Haddad =

Lebanese politician (born 1950)

Minister of Economy and Trade
- In office 2005 – 22 July 2008
- Succeeded by: Mohammad Safadi

Personal details
- Born: 26 August 1950 (age 76) Beirut, Lebanon
- Party: Independent
- Education: American University of Beirut

Sami Haddad (Arabic: سامي حداد; born 26 August 1950) was the Lebanese Minister of Economy and Trade.

== Early life and education ==
Haddad was born in Beirut on 26 August 1950. He graduated from the American University of Beirut (AUB) in 1971 with a degree in economics. He earned a master's degree in economics in 1977 from AUB and studied for a PhD in development economics from 1977 to 1979 at the University of Wisconsin–Madison, fulfilling all requirements for the degree except the dissertation.

== Career ==
Haddad began his banking career at Société Générale in Beirut. From 1979 to 1981 he worked as advisor to the governor of the Banque du Liban, Lebanon's central bank, and taught economics at the American University of Beirut. In 1981, he began to work at the International Finance Corporation (IFC), part of the World Bank Group, in several positions, including director of the Middle East and North Africa regions based in Cairo. His tenure continued until his appointment as minister of economy and trade (2005–2008). He was the chairman and chief executive officer of Byblos Invest Bank General Manager and a board member of Byblos Bank and chairman of ADIR, an insurance company, from 2008 until 2014. He was the chairman and general manager of Banque de Crédit National S.A.L. He was also the chairman of Inventis group. He is also an independent non-executive director at Orascom Construction, a global engineering and construction contractor.

== Personal life ==
Haddad resides in Beirut and he is married to Hanan Fakhoury with whom he has two children.
