= Marj, Lebanon =

Marj مرج (البقاع الغربي)
- Village
- Location in Lebanon
- Coordinates: 33°45′50″N 35°53′00″E
- Country: Lebanon
- Governorate: Beqaa Governorate
- District: Western Beqaa
- Elevation: 2,660 ft (810 m)
- Time zone: UTC+2 (EET)
  - Summer (DST): +3

Marj (Arabic: مرج (البقاع الغربي) a village located in the Western Beqaa District of the Beqaa Governorate in Lebanon. Al Marj’s population is approximately 25,000 Lebanese. Al Marj is known for being the biggest manufacturer of furniture in western Bekaa, for having one of the biggest souks in the beBand for is beautiful green fields. It is a very central town near Zahlé and nearer to Beirut about, 50 km away.

== Population ==
Al Marj’s population is approximately 25,000 with many of its inhabitants having immigrated to the United States, Canada, Brazil, Colombia, and Germany. The major surnames or families in Al Marj are Saleh, Jarrah, Zaarour, Darwich, Harb, Shmoury, Abo Othman, Ghazi, Hamdanieh, Shaheen, Zein Eldeen, Shamaly, Outa, Howari, Ibrahim, Sayed, Hassna, Al Khatib, Kanaan, Zeina, Zahlani, Jaji, Dahrouj, khaldieh, Nassabeih, Elkak, Chaaban, Baalbaki, Al Rassoul.etc

== History ==
In 1838, Eli Smith noted it as eel-Merj, a Sunni Muslim, Maronite and Catholic village in the Beqaa Valley.⁣⁣.

== Bibliography ==
- Robinson, E.; Smith, E. (1841). Biblical Researches in Palestine, Mount Sinai and Arabia Petraea: A Journal of Travels in the year 1838. Vol. 3. Boston: Crocker & Brewster.
