= Kayssar Moawad =

Lebanese politician

Dr. Kayssar Moawad is a Lebanese physician and politician.

Moawad lost his father at age of 5, who was killed by a member of the Douaihy during the clan battles in Zgharta. Kayssar Moawad studied in Tripoli, where he was active in a leftist student group in the 1970s. He continued his studies in Paris, specializing in oncological surgery. He returned to Lebanon in 1982 and founded a number of institutions in his home area; the Development Committee in Zgharta, free medical clinic and a cultural centre.

Moawad contested the parliamentary elections in 1992 and 1996, confronting Nayla Moawad (a distant relative). He was elected to parliament in 2000, contesting on the list of Suleiman Franjieh.

In 2014 the US$20 million Family Medical Center opened in Zgharta, with Moawad as one of its owners.

Moawad was fielded on the "Pulse of Strong Republic" list in the 2018 Lebanese general election for one of the Maronite seats in Zgharta, but announced his withdrawal from the electoral race on April 27, 2018.
