= Herharaya =

Herharaya هرهريا
- Town
- Location within Lebanon
- Coordinates: 34°1′29″N 35°41′52″E
- Country: Lebanon
- Governorate: Keserwan-Jbeil
- District: Keserwan
- Time zone: UTC+2 (EET)
  - Summer (DST): UTC+3 (EEST)
- Dialing code: +961

Herharaya (alternatively Harhraya, Herhrayya; Levantine Arabic: هرهريا, romanized: Herharayā ) is a township in the municipality and administrative division of Jdaidet Ghazir – Harharaya – Qattine in the Keserwan District of the Keserwan-Jbeil Governorate in Lebanon. The town is about 31 kilometres (19 mi) north of Beirut. It has an average elevation of 540 meters (1,770 ft) above sea level and its total land area is 167 hectares (410 acres).

The municipality of is a member of Municipal Federation of Kesrouane Al Ftouh.

== Notable people ==
- Ignatius Ziade (1906–1944), Archbishop of the Maronite Catholic Archeparchy of Aleppo and the Maronite Catholic Archeparchy of Beirut
- Philippe Ziade (born 1976), entrepreneur and honorary consul in Nevada

== Bibliography ==
- Aouad, Michel (6 July 2016). "Jdaidet Ghazir - Harharaya - Qattine - Localiban". Localiban. Centre de ressources sur le développement local au Liban. Archived from the original on 1 December 2020.
- Aouad, Michel (22 July 2019). "Harharaya". www.libandata.org. Archived from the original on 25 February 2021.
