= Qornet Shehwan Gathering =

Lebanese political organization

The Qornet Shehwan Gathering (Arabic: لقاء قرنة شهوان) is a Lebanese political organization, comprising politicians, intellectuals, and businesspeople, mostly Christian and ranging in ideology from the centre-right to the centre-left. The organization is not a political party in the classical sense: its members belong to, and in some cases lead, a variety of political parties. It is more of a loose coalition, although whether it intends to organize electorally is unclear. The coalition adheres to seven principles and pursues five objectives.

== History ==
The coalition takes its name from the town of its headquarters, Qornet Shehwan, a town in the Matn District of the Mount Lebanon Governorate, and the seat of the Maronite Archbishopric of the district. It was founded on 30 April 2001 by total of 29 individuals, representing political parties and civic organizations, as well as independents, with the blessing of the Maronite Patriarch Nasrallah Boutros Sfeir and under the leadership of the region's bishop Youssef Bechara. Membership (see below) has fluctuated since, as some founding members and parties are no longer affiliated. Even Patriarch Sfeir retreated from his earlier endorsement of the group (under government pressure, some allege) to a less partisan stance. Some who have left continue to work with the coalition informally, however.

As a prelude to a full withdrawal of Syrian troops, the Qornet Shehwan originally called for their redeployment to the Bekaa Valley and described Israel as the main danger to Lebanon. In the wake of the assassination of former Prime Minister Rafic Hariri on 14 February 2005, however, the Qornet Shehwan escalated its campaign to call for the immediate withdrawal of Syrian military and intelligence forces from Lebanon, and for fresh parliamentary and presidential elections to be held, free from foreign interference. Qornet Shehwan member (and now parliamentarian) Samir Frangieh said on 16 March 2005 that parliamentary elections must precede presidential ones, because the current parliament (elected in 2000 and allegedly gerrymandered to produce a pro-Syrian majority), would be likely to elect another pro-Syrian President to succeed Émile Lahoud, whom the opposition considers to be a Syrian puppet.

The 2005 parliamentary elections results were disastrous for the Qornet Shehwan Gathering, because most of their candidates lost to Free Patriotic Movement of general Michel Aoun, whose candidates grabbed 21 seats in the Christian heartland. Only 14 members of the gathering (Nayla Moawad, Jawad Boulos, Solange Gemayel, Gebran Tueni, Samir Frangieh, Boutros Harb, two of the Kataeb candidates and six of the Lebanese Forces candidates) managed to get to the parliament.

== Principles ==
The Qornet Shehwan Gathering adheres to the following seven principles:

1. Lebanon is not an artificial state, but a homeland for all Lebanese people. As such, it is entitled to its independence, and can solve its problems only as an independent nation.
2. Differences between Lebanon's political groups and religious sects must be solved by mutual respect and dialogue, not by confrontation.
3. The Taif Agreement and the related subsequent constitutional amendments must be implemented as written, not manipulated by "external forces to achieve internal gains." (At this point, the Qornet Shehwan differs from some of the more extreme opposition groups, which reject the Taif Agreement).
4. A modern constitutional structure, based on democracy and committed to the rule of law, guaranteeing equality for all citizens, must be built. The judiciary should be independent of political interference.
5. Israel is seen as "the major source of danger to the people and the land." The resistance to the Israeli occupation of Southern Lebanon (1982–2000) is applauded. (In this matter, the Qornet Shehwan does not antagonize the foreign policy status quo, thereby avoiding a divisive political issue).
6. The Syrian occupation of Lebanon must end, and Lebanon and Syria must reconstitute their relationship as equal parties. Sound relations and "brotherly ties" can be achieved only if neither party is controlled by the other.
7. Lebanon is an integral part of the Arab world, and wants to play a full part in it as a sovereign state.

== Objectives ==
The Qornet Shehwan Gathering pursues the following five objectives:

1. The withdrawal of all Syrian forces from Lebanon and the recovery of full sovereignty.
2. Formulation of a new electoral law to eliminate gerrymandering, establishment of judicial independence, and limitation of the right of security forces to intervene.
3. Comprehensive national reconciliation, the return of exiles, and the release of political prisoners.
4. Palestinian refugees in Lebanon to be moved to the Palestinian state, with Israel and the international community charged with responsibility for their resettlement.
5. An Arab-wide "just and comprehensive" peace settlement with Israel to "safeguard Arab rights." No peace settlement is to be made by Lebanon unilaterally.

== Membership ==
The following parties and individuals are or have been members of the Qornet Shehwan Gathering. Parties, and their respective members, are listed alphabetically, except for the leader of the party who, if a Qornet participant, is placed at the top of his or her party's list. Those who are currently members of the National Assembly are tagged (MP).

=== Present members ===
Lebanese Forces

- Abillammaa, Eddy (Maronite; MP)

Democratic Renewal Movement

- Ziadeh, Kamil (Maronite; former MP)

Kataeb (Phalangist) Party

- Gemayel, Amine (Maronite; former President, 1982–1988)
- Gemayel, Solange (Maronite; widow of president-elect Bachir Gemayel, MP)
- Elie Karame (Melkite-Greek Catholic)

Independence Movement – Harakat Al-Istiklal

- Moawad, Michel (Maronite)
- Moawad, Nayla (Maronite; MP)
- Boulos, Jawad (Maronite)
- El Douaihy, Youssef (Maronite)

Maronite League

- Shehab, Hares (Maronite)

National Liberal Party

- Abou Assi, Elias (Maronite)

Independents

- El-Bone, Mansour (Maronite; former MP)
- Frangieh, Samir (Maronite; former MP)
- Harb, Boutros (Maronite; MP)
- Honein, Salah (Maronite; former MP)
- Karam, Simon (Maronite; former Lebanese Ambassador to the United States)
- Khoury, Michel (Maronite; former minister)
- Nehme, Jad (Maronite)
- Souaid, Fares Son of Nouhad Souaid (Maronite; former MP)

=== Former members ===
- Democratic Renewal (Lebanon)
  - Salem, Nadim (Greek Catholic; former MP and Minister) (Natural Death)
- Kataeb (Phalangist) Party:
  - Gemayel, Pierre (Maronite; former MP) (assassinated)
  - Ghanem, Antoine (Maronite; former MP) (assassinated)
- Free Patriotic Movement (led by General Michel Aoun):
  - Nader, Sami (Maronite)
  - Khoury, Youssef (Maronite)
- Lebanese Forces:
  - Hindi, Toufic (Syriac Orthodox)
- National Bloc:
  - Kleemos, Antoine (Maronite)
  - Kortbawi, Shakeeb (Maronite)
  - Malak, Samir Abdel (Maronite)
  - Salhab, Salim (Maronite)
- independents:
  - Khazen, Farid (Maronite; Professor of Political Science at the American University of Beirut, MP)
  - Tueni, Gebran (Greek Orthodox; former MP) (assassinated)
  - Tueni, Ghassan (Greek Orthodox; former chairman of An-Nahar; former MP, father of former-MP Gebran Tueni, killed on 12 December 2005). He died in 2012.
