= Democratic Renewal (Lebanon) =

Democratic Renewal Movement حركة التجدد الديموقراطي
- Abbreviation: DRM
- Leader: Farouk Jabre
- Founders: Nassib Lahoud, Camille Ziade, Antoine Haddad, Mona Fayyad, Nadim Salem
- Founded: 2001; 25 years ago
- Headquarters: Beirut, Lebanon
- Ideology: Liberalism; Social liberalism Secularism; Reformism; Nonsectarianism
- Political position: Centre
- National affiliation: March 14 Alliance
- Colors: Navy blue

Website
- tajaddod.org

The Democratic Renewal Movement (Arabic: حركة التجدد الديموقراطي; often known by the shortened name Tajaddod) is a reformist, social liberal, secular political party in Lebanon.

The party was founded in 2001 by a group of 50 Lebanese political figures, intellectuals and businessmen. It was headed by Nassib Lahoud (1944–2012), former presidential aspirant, deputy of the Metn region from 1991 until 2005. After Nassib Lahoud's death on 2 February 2012, DRM's vice-president, former MP Camille Ziade, became the acting president, a post he would retain until July 2013. On 19 July 2013, Ziade was elected president of the Movement.

On 23 August Farouk Jabre was elected president of the movement with Antoine Haddad and Malek Mrowa as Vice Presidents. Jabre is a Lebanese businessman who holds an MBA from Columbia Business School and a BA from the American University of Beirut. He sits on the board of several charitable organizations in Lebanon.

The Democratic Renewal has had four members in the Parliament, Nadim Salem of Jezzine in South Lebanon (1972–2000), Nassib Lahoud of Metn in Mount Lebanon (1991–2005), Camille Ziade of Kesrwan in Mount Lebanon (1992–2000), and Misbah Ahdab of Tripoli in North Lebanon (1996–2009).
