= Ministry of Economy and Trade (Lebanon) =

Government ministry of Lebanon

Lebanese Republic Ministry of Economy and Trade
- وزارة الأقتصاد والتجارة

Agency overview
- Jurisdiction: Government of Lebanon
- Minister responsible: Amer Bisat
- Website: economy.gov.lb/en

Ministry of Economy and Trade (MOET; Arabic: وزارة الأقتصاد والتجارة) is a governmental ministry of Lebanon, headquartered on the 5th floor of the Azarieh Building in Beirut.

Since 8 February 2025, the ministry has been led by Amer Bisat as Minister of Economy and Trade.

== List of Economy and Trade ministers ==
Minister	Term of office	
Adel Osseiran	25 Sep 1943	02 Jul 1944
Riad Al Solh (Note: Position titled as Minister of Supplies and Reserves.) (Note: Served simultaneously as Prime Minister.) (Note: Served simultaneously as Minister of Interior and Municipalities.)	03 Jul 1944	09 Jan 1945
Jamil Talhouk	09 Jan 1945	22 Aug 1945
Sami as-Solh (Note: Served simultaneously as Minister of Telecommunications from 22 August 1945 until 9 April 1946.)	22 Aug 1945	22 May 1946
Saadi Al Munla	22 May 1946	14 Dec 1946
Kamal Jumblat	14 Dec 1946	07 Jun 1947
Sleiman Nawfal	07 Jun 1947	26 Jul 1948
Philippe Takla (Note: Served simultaneously as Minister of Telecommunications.)	26 Jul 1948	01 Oct 1949
Philippe Takla	01 Oct 1949	14 Feb 1951
Boulos Fayyad (Note: Served simultaneously as Minister of Justice.)	14 Feb 1951	07 Jun 1951
Philippe Takla (Note: Served simultaneously as Minister of Finance.)	07 Jun 1951	11 Feb 1952
Sleiman Al Ali	11 Feb 1952	09 Sep 1952
Basil Trad (Note: Did not present themselves in front of Parliament and did not submit a ministerial statement.)	09 Sep 1952	18 Sep 1952
Basil Trad	18 Sep 1952	30 Sep 1952
George Hakim	30 Sep 1952	30 Apr 1953
George Hakim (Note: Served simultaneously as Minister of Foreign Affairs.)	30 Apr 1953	16 Aug 1953
Rashid Karami	16 Aug 1953	19 Sep 1955
Nazih Al Bizri	19 Sep 1955	19 Mar 1956
George Hakim (Note: Served simultaneously as Minister of Education.) (Note: George Hakim was named Minister of Economy in March 1956. The entire cabinet, except for Hakim and Public Works Minister Emile Boustany, resigned on 8 June 1956. By the time a newer cabinet had its first collective meeting on 9 June 1956, Hakim, who had been asked to stay on as economic minister, declined that position, instead choosing to return to his post as Lebanese minister to West Germany. George Karam, a former minister, lumber importer and co-founder of Banque Nationale Foncière Commerciale et Industriale (BNFCI), was offered two positions in the new cabinet, as Minister of Finance and Minister of Economy.)	19 Mar 1956	08 Jun 1956
George Karam	09 Jun 1956	18 Nov 1956
Nasri Maalouf	18 Nov 1956	18 Aug 1957
Kazem al-Khalil	18 Aug 1957	14 Mar 1958
Kazem al-Khalil (Note: Served simultaneously as Minister of Telecommunications from 23 May 1958 until 24 September 1958.)	14 Mar 1958	24 Sep 1958
Charles Helou	24 Sep 1958	14 Oct 1958
Philippe Takla	14 Oct 1958	14 May 1960
Philippe Takla (Note: Their task was to hold parliamentary elections, and no ministerial statement was submitted.)	14 May 1960	01 Aug 1960
Sleiman Al Ali	01 Aug 1960	20 May 1961
Philippe Boulos	20 May 1961	31 Oct 1961
Rafic Naja	31 Oct 1961	20 Feb 1964
Fouad Ammoun	20 Feb 1964	25 Sep 1964
Joseph Najjar	25 Sep 1964	18 Nov 1964
Bahij Taq-al-Din	18 Nov 1964	25 Jul 1965
Rafic Naja	25 Jul 1965	09 Apr 1966
Sobhi Mahmassani (Note: Position retitled as Minister of National Economy.)	09 Apr 1966	06 Dec 1966
Said Hamadeh	06 Dec 1966	08 Feb 1968
Edward Honein	08 Feb 1968	12 Oct 1968
Nasri Maalouf (Note: Did not present themselves in front of Parliament, and submitted their resignation on 20 October 1968.)	12 Oct 1968	20 Oct 1968
Hussein Al Oweini (Note: Served simultaneously as Minister of Defense.)	20 Oct 1968	15 Jan 1969
Nassim Majdalani	15 Jan 1969	25 Nov 1969
Suleiman Frangieh (Note: After Suleiman Frangieh was elected President of Lebanon, Nassim Majdalani was appointed Minister of Economy to serve out the remainder of Frangieh's term.) / Nassim Majdalani	25 Nov 1969	13 Oct 1970
Saeb Jaroudi	13 Oct 1970	27 May 1972
Anwar Al Sabbah	27 May 1972	25 Apr 1973
Bahij Tabbara (Note: Position retitled as Minister of Economy and Trade.) (Note: Did not present themselves in front of Parliament, and submitted their resignation on 14 June 1973. Their resignation was accepted 8 July 1973.)	25 Apr 1973	08 Jul 1973
Nazih Al Bizri	08 Jul 1973	30 Oct 1974
Abbas Khalaf	31 Oct 1974	22 May 1975
Fawzi Al Khatib (Note: Did not submit a ministerial statement to Parliament.)	22 May 1975	01 Jul 1975
Adel Osseiran / Joseph Skaff (Note: Ministerial portfolios were redistributed and Joseph Skaff was appointed Minister of Economy.)	01 Jul 1975	09 Dec 1976
Selim al-Hoss	09 Dec 1976	16 Jul 1979
Talal El Merhebi	16 Jul 1979	25 Oct 1980
Khaled Jumblat	25 Oct 1980	08 Oct 1982
Ibrahim Halawi (Note: Position retitled as Minister of Economy, Trade & Tourism.)	08 Oct 1982	29 Apr 1984
Victor Kassir (Note: Position retitled as Minister of Economy & Trade, & of Industry & Oil.)	30 Apr 1984	22 Sep 1988
Issam Abu Jamra	22 Sep 1988	25 Nov 1989
Nazih Al Bizri	25 Nov 1989	23 Dec 1990
Marwan Hamadeh	24 Dec 1990	15 May 1992
Samir Makdasi	16 May 1992	30 Oct 1992
Hagop Demerjian	31 Oct 1992	25 May 1995
Yassine Jaber	25 May 1995	24 Dec 1998
Nasser Saidi	24 Dec 1998	23 Oct 2000
Bassel Fleihan	23 Oct 2000	17 Apr 2003
Marwan Hamadeh	17 Apr 2003	21 Oct 2004
Adnan Kassar	26 Oct 2004	19 Apr 2005
Damianos Kattar	19 Apr 2005	19 Jul 2005
Sami Haddad	19 Jul 2005	21 Jul 2008
Mohammad Safadi	22 Jul 2008	13 Jun 2011
Nicolas Nahas	13 Jun 2011	15 Feb 2014
Alain Hakim	15 Feb 2014	18 Dec 2016
Raed Khoury	18 Dec 2016	31 Jan 2019
Monsour Bteish	31 Jan 2019	21 Jan 2020
Raoul Nehme (Note: Resigned 10 August 2020, but remained in office as caretaker minister.)	21 Jan 2020	10 Sep 2021
Amin Salam (Note: Resigned 30 October 2022, but remained in office as caretaker minister.)	10 Sep 2021	08 Feb 2025
Amer Bisat	08 Feb 2025	Incumbent
