= Nazli Moawad =

Egyptian political scientist

Nazli Moawad (Arabic: نازلي معوض) is an Egyptian political science professor at Faculty of Political Science at Cairo University. She was granted the National Legion of Honour (Chevalier d’honneur), the highest French honor, by France’s President.
