= Nayla Moawad =

Lebanese first lady, journalist and politician

- نايلة معوض
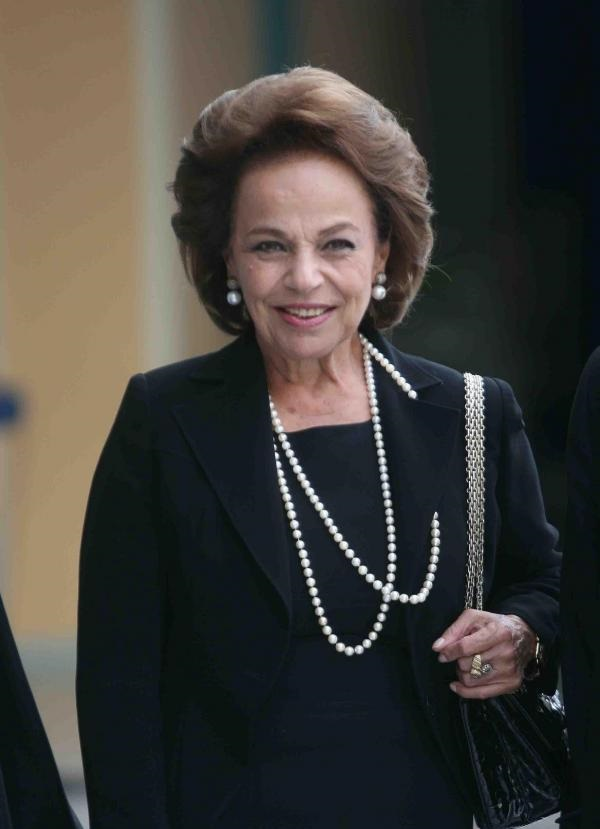
- Nayla Moawad in 2015

Minister of Social Affairs
- In office 19 July 2005 – 11 July 2008
- Prime Minister: Fouad Siniora
- Preceded by: Mohamad Jawad Khalifeh
- Succeeded by: Mario Aoun

First Lady of Lebanon
- In role 5 November 1989 – 22 November 1989
- President: René Moawad
- Preceded by: Nadia El-Chami
- Succeeded by: Mona Jammal

Personal details
- Born: Nayla El-Khouri; July 3, 1940 (age 86) Bsharri, Lebanon
- Party: Qornet Shehwan Gathering; Independence Movement
- Spouse: René Moawad (m. 1965; died 1989)
- Children: 2, including Michel Moawad
- Education: Saint Joseph University; Cambridge University
- Occupation: Journalist, politician

Nayla Moawad (née El-Khouri, Arabic: نايلة معوض; born 3 July 1940) is a Lebanese politician and former First Lady of Lebanon. Outside of Lebanon, she is best known as the widow of former President René Moawad, who was assassinated on 22 November 1989, after serving only 18 days as president. Within Lebanon, she is a high-profile politician in her own right, having served as a member of the National Assembly since 1991. Following her reelection in June 2005, she was appointed to the Cabinet on 19 July as Minister for Social Affairs.

== Early life and education ==
Born in Bsharri, Lebanon, as the daughter of Nagib Issa El-Khouri and Evelyne Roch. Her father was the scion of a prominent Maronite Christian family and a relative of Bechara El Khoury, Lebanon's first post-independence president. She was educated at the Ecole des Franciscaines Missionnaires de Marie, Rue du Musee, a Catholic school, and subsequently graduated from Saint Joseph's University with a bachelor of arts degree in French literature and history. She later studied English at Cambridge University in the United Kingdom.

== Career and marriage ==
From 1962 to 1965, Moawad worked as a journalist for the daily newspaper, L'Orient. In 1965, she married René Moawad, surprising many people since he was the scion of a rival clan, who was fifteen years her senior. Despite the disparity in their ages, and despite the traditional antagonism between their families, the marriage was a happy one and produced two children. Rima, a lawyer and a graduate of Harvard University, and Michel, also a lawyer and businessman, who graduated from Sorbonne University in Paris.

Moawad sought to perpuate her slain husband's legacy by founding the René Moawad Foundation in 1990, which works for social justice and economic development in Lebanon and the Arab world. Since 1994, she has served as president of the Center for Research and Education on Democracy.

== Parliamentary career ==
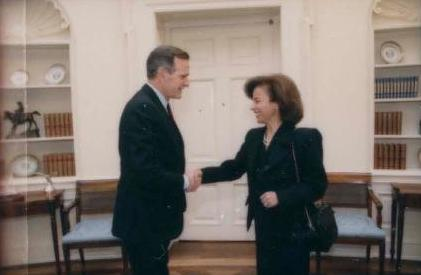
Moawad greeting President George H. W. Bush in 1990

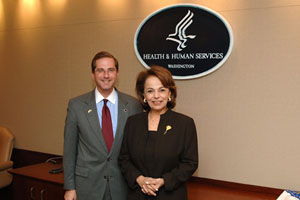
Moawad with Alex Azar in 2006

Moawad became a member of the National Assembly in 1991, representing the Zgharta-Tripoli constituency in northern Lebanon. She was the second woman to serve as a deputy in Lebanon, following Myrna Bustani's brief tenure in 1963. She served on numerous parliamentary committees, specializing in such diverse fields as finance, children's rights, and education. She campaigned strongly for women's and children's rights, and opposed political corruption. She is a prominent member of the Qornet Shehwan Gathering, a coalition of Christian parliamentarians which opposed the Syrian military presence in Lebanon and continues to campaign for the building of a modern, democratic nation state. She is also a member of the Democratic Forum, a coalition comprising both Christian and Muslim parliamentarians opposed to the pro-Syrian government. She has also been affiliated with the National Front, a multi-sectarian parliamentary block working for political reforms. In the general election held in May–June 2005, she retained her seat.

In 2004, Moawad announced her candidacy for the presidency in elections scheduled to be held that year. These were postponed, however, until 2007.

Moawad's son, Michel, founded a new political party in 2006 called Independence Movement. The movement is part of the anti-Syrian Qornet Shehwan Gathering and the March 14 Alliance. During the period between 2005 and 2009 it had 3 Maronite Christian MPs for the Zgharta District in the Lebanese Parliament, namely Nayla Moawad, Jawad Simon Boulos and Samir Frangieh. Since 2009, the party has been led by Michel René Moawad, Jawad Simon Boulos and Youssef Bahaa El Douaihy.

In the 2009 Lebanese elections, Moawad decided not to run for a seat in her district. She instead encouraged and supported the election of her son Michel. He and the Independence Movement's other two candidates in the district lost to their opponent Suleiman Frangieh and his coalition. Nayla Moawad still remains a strong anti-Syrian lobbyist and is still a member of the 14 March Movement.

Honorary titles
Preceded by Nadia El-Chami	First Lady of Lebanon; 1989	Succeeded by Mona Jammal
Political offices
Preceded by Mohamad Jawad Khalifeh	Minister of Social Affairs; 2005–2008	Succeeded by Mario Aoun
