= March 14 Alliance =

Lebanese anti-Assad regime political coalition

March 14 Alliance تحالف ١٤ آذار
- Leader: Saad Hariri; Walid Jumblatt; Samir Geagea
- General Secretary: Fares Souaid
- Founded: 14 March 2005
- Dissolved: 2016
- Headquarters: Beirut
- Ideology: Lebanese nationalism Anti-Syrian government
- Political position: Big tent
- Colors: Red, white

Party flag

The March 14 Alliance (Arabic: تحالف 14 آذار, romanized: taḥāluf 14 āḏār), named after the date of the Cedar Revolution, was a coalition of political parties and independents in Lebanon formed in 2005 that were united by their anti-Assad stance and by their opposition to the March 8 Alliance. It was led by Saad Hariri, Walid Jumblatt and Samir Geagea, as well as other prominent figures.

== History ==
The alliance was formed during public demonstrations which took place one month after the assassination of Lebanon's former Prime Minister, Rafiq Hariri. This was known as the Cedar Revolution. Two protests against Syria's 29-year occupation of Lebanon were staged because it was believed that Syria had supported the murder. The Alliance was given its name in honor of the day that Syrian forces left Lebanon, which is perceived as the major achievement of the Cedar Revolution.

The March 14 Alliance was made up of a range of sectarian and secular organizations that ordinarily have divergent political agendas. To pursue their shared interest in seeing Syrian forces leave Lebanon, the parties banded together.

=== Free Patriotic Movement's withdrawal ===
The Free Patriotic Movement of General Michel Aoun left the informal grouping before the 2005 general election, before March 14 was an established alliance, due to major disagreements and when its leader Michel Aoun signed a Memorandum of Understanding with Hezbollah. After the 2005 elections, The Free Patriotic Movement was the sole political opposition, but one year later joined the pro-Syrian government March 8 Alliance in November 2006.

=== 2006 Lebanon War ===
On 12 July 2006, the 2006 Lebanon War between Israel and Hezbollah started when the latter ambushed an Israeli army border patrol, killing three soldiers and capturing two others. During the war, the March 14 coalition took a stance against Hezbollah accusing the armed party of causing the war on Lebanon. However, Hezbollah claimed that Israel preplanned such a war, supposed to be waged on September during the annual rally Hezbollah holds on the International Qods (Jerusalem) Day.

The March 14 coalition, amidst the war, urged Hezbollah to hand over their weapons, accusing the party of causing the war on Lebanon.

During the first few days of the war, former US Secretary of State Condoleezza Rice visited Beirut and held a meeting with the March 14 coalition and declared afterwards that a new Middle East will be born after this war, saying: "It's time for a new Middle East." Rice and Fouad Siniora met during her visit to Lebanon.

=== 2008 clashes ===
In May 2008, the tensions between the pro-government and opposition parties escalated when the Cabinet announced a series of security decisions. Tensions began with revelations on Friday May 2 made by Progressive Socialist Party leader Walid Jumblatt, a key politician in the ruling March 14 alliance. He announced that a remote-controlled camera had been set up in a container park overlooking Beirut international airport's runway 17, which was frequently being used by March 14 politicians. In March 14 circles, fear was that the monitoring could be used for a possible attack on its leaders, as Lebanon had faced a series of political assassinations in recent times. Although Jumblatt did not accuse the party directly, he made clear that he thought March 8's Hezbollah was behind the monitoring system's installment. Hezbollah dismissed the accusations, calling the allegation a product of Jumblatt's imagination and saying that those who leveled them were scaremongering and simply parroting a US campaign against it and other groups which are resisting Israel. In addition to the monitoring system, Jumblatt stated that Hezbollah had laid down a fiber optic telecommunication network connecting its powerbase in Dahiya in South Beirut with cities and towns in South and East Lebanon in predominantly Shiite areas.

In its response to these allegations, the Lebanese Cabinet announced that it regarded the telecommunication network and the monitoring system as a breach of law, undermining the state's sovereignty and the security of its citizens. Therefore, it declared that the matter would be referred not only to the Lebanese judicial system, but also to the Arab League and the United Nations.

Coincidentally, a day after the Cabinet's decision, on Wednesday May 7, the Lebanese General Workers Union had planned a general strike to demand higher wages and decry high consumer prices. The strike turned violent as the opposition threw their weight behind the strike, paralyzing large parts of Lebanon's capital Beirut. Clashes later erupted throughout the country in the following weeks

=== 2009 parliamentary elections ===
On 8 June 2009, March 14 won the majority in the Lebanese parliament with 71 out of 128 seats.

14 out of 26 electoral districts were won by March 14:

- Akkar (7/7)
- Minniyeh-Danniyeh (3/3)
- Tripoli (8/8)
- Koura (3/3)
- Bcharreh (2/2)
- Batroun (2/2)
- Beirut 1 (5/5)
- Beirut 2 (2/4)
- Beirut 3 (10/10)
- Aley (4/5) Jumblatt left an empty seat for Talal Arslan
- Chouf (8/8)
- Saida (2/2)
- Zahle (7/7)
- West Bekaa-Rashaya (6/6)

=== Progressive Socialist Party's withdrawal ===
In August 2009, the Progressive Socialist Party left the alliance, claiming political neutrality after the 2008 Lebanon conflict, though they still supported lists of March 14 members, mostly the Lebanese Forces.

== Death of the March 14 Alliance ==
In 2016, the March 14 Alliance experienced an end to its activities, without an official announcement detailing the reasons for its closure. In the 2018 elections, Future Movement decided to make an electoral alliance with the Free Patriotic Movement in North III, Beirut I and Bekaa I which caused a split between long time March 14 allies Future Movement and the Lebanese Forces. In October 2018, Saad Hariri promised to allocate the Ministry of Justice to the LF (Lebanese Forces) however, he ultimately appointed the FPM (Free Patriotic Movement) to that ministerial position instead. In October 2020, Samir Geagea refused to name Hariri to form the government.

After the 2022 elections, the March 14 Alliance was replaced by the Lebanese Opposition which was formed by the Lebanese Forces, Progressive Socialist Party, Kataeb, Renewal Bloc and sovereign independent MPs like Mark Daou and Waddah Sadek.

== 14march.org ==
14march.org was the official March 14 alliance website. It went online on 9 March 2006 and was shut down by the Future Movement on 16 January 2019.

== Claims ==
The principal political claims of the March 14 Alliance were:

- The exile of the former President Émile Lahoud, reputed an illegitimate president under the Syrian regime in September 2004.
- Institution of a court for a case against Prime Minister Rafic Hariri's killers.
- Pacification with Syria and review of the Syrian-Lebanese borders.
- Opposition to the Syrian interference in Lebanon.
- Institution of a weapons government monopoly, disarmament of Hezbollah and review control of the Lebanese Armed Forces by the President and general Michel Suleiman and the police by the Prime Minister.

== Ex-member parties ==
Party	Ideology	Demographic base	Party seats
Represented parties
Lebanese Forces	Lebanese nationalism, Conservatism	Christians	19 / 128
Future Movement	Conservative liberalism	Sunni Muslims	8 / 128
Kataeb Party	Lebanese nationalism, Christian democracy	Christians	4 / 128
Independence Movement	Lebanese nationalism	Nonsectarian (official); Christians (majority)	2 / 128
Islamic Group	Islamic democracy, Pan-Islamism, Sunni Islamism	Sunni Muslims	1 / 128
National Liberal Party	National liberalism	Nonsectarian (official); Christians (majority)	1 / 128
Unrepresented parties
National Bloc	Social liberalism, Lebanese nationalism Historical: Liberal conservatism	Nonsectarian (official); Christians (majority)	0 / 128
Democratic Left Movement	Social democracy	Nonsectarian (official)	0 / 128
Democratic Renewal	Social liberalism	Nonsectarian (official)	0 / 128
Hunchakian Party	Social democracy, Democratic socialism, Armenian interests	Armenians	0 / 128
Armenian Democratic Liberal Party	Classical liberalism, Armenian interests	Armenians	0 / 128
Lebanese Option Party	Moderate Shia Islamism, Liberalism and Economic liberalism	Shia Muslims	0 / 128
Free Shia Movement	Islamic democracy	Shia Muslims	0 / 128
Syriac Union Party	Syriac interests	Syriac Christians	0 / 128
Shuraya Party	Assyrian self-determination	Assyrians (Christians)	0 / 128

== See also ==
- List of attacks in Lebanon
- March 8 Alliance
