= Lebanon–European Union relations =

European Union-Lebanon relations
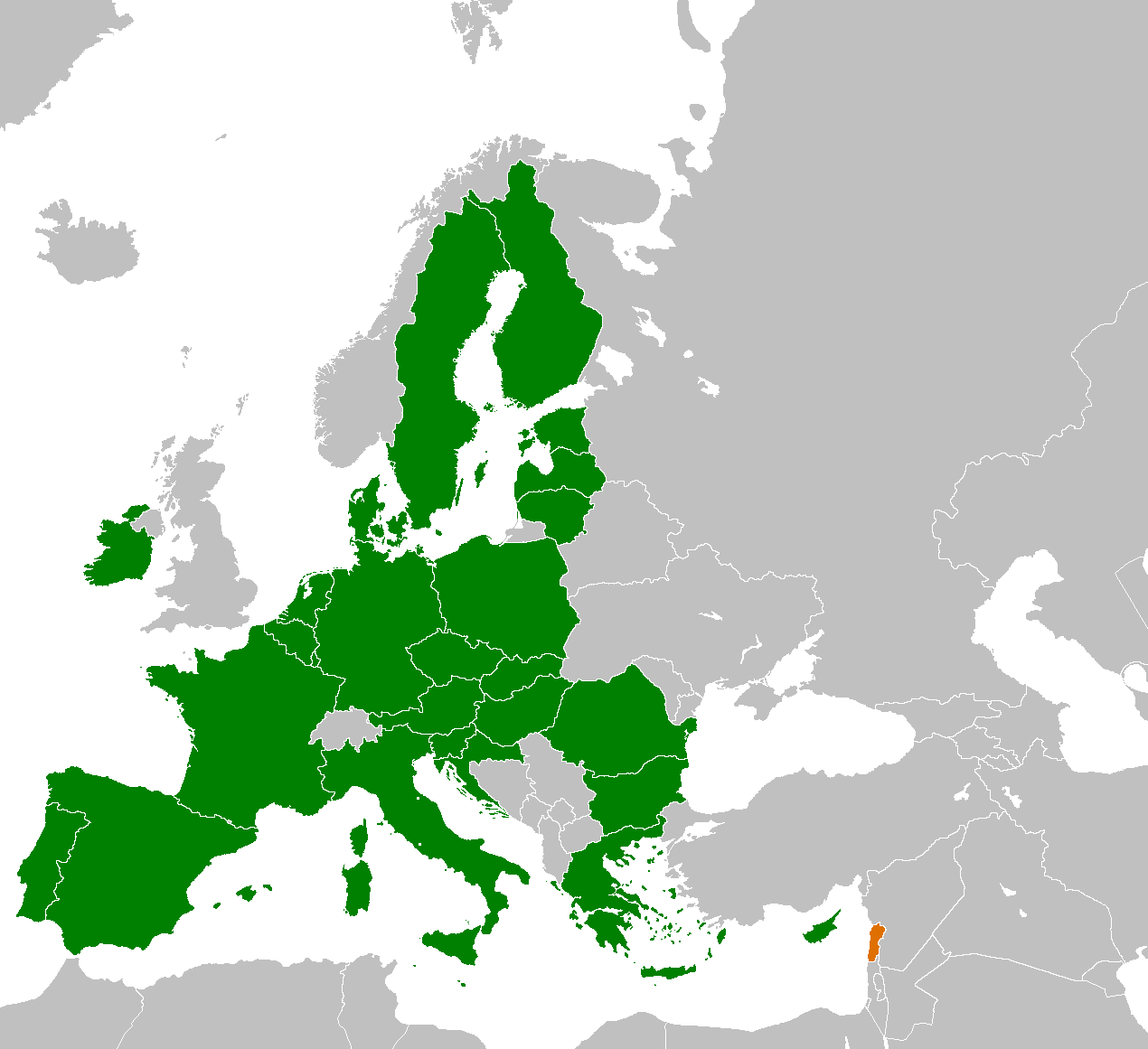
- European Union: Lebanon

Lebanon–European Union relations see substantial ties through the EU's European Neighborhood Policy (ENP). The EU is the largest trading partner of Lebanon.

== Agreements ==
Lebanon concluded negotiations on an association agreement with the European Union in late 2001, and both sides initialed the accord in January 2002, the accord becoming known as the EU-Lebanon Association Agreement. The EU-Lebanon Action Plan from 19 January 2007 gave a new impetus to bilateral relations in the framework of the ENP.

Lebanon is one of the main Mediterranean beneficiaries of community assistance and the EU through its various instruments is Lebanon's leading donor. Starting from 2007, financial support is channeled through the European Neighborhood Policy Instrument. A Lebanon Country Strategy Paper 2007–2013 and a National Indicative Program 2007–2010 have been adopted by the EU. The assistance provided was refocused after the Second Lebanon War in order to engage in real help for the government and the society in reconstruction and reform of the country.

== Membership of the European Union's Union for the Mediterranean ==
EU's Union for the Mediterranean

Lebanon is also a member of the European Union's Union for the Mediterranean from 13 July 2008 that includes 43 member states. From the European Union side include all 27 European Union member states and 16 member states from the side of the Mediterranean Partner countries. The European Union's Union for the Mediterranean was established on 13 July 2008 and its headquarter is in Barcelona, Spain.

== Trade ==
The EU is Lebanon's largest trading partner, accounting a third of its imports at €3.9billion in 2008; this was mainly machinery (22%) and transport equipment (11.7%), chemicals (13%) and energy products (21.2%). Lebanese exports to the EU amounted to €0.36 billion; mainly manufactured products (66%). Lebanon's substantial trade deficit is offset by foreign income earnings, such as from the Lebanese diaspora and the tourism. 60% of Lebanese GDP is in the service sector.

== Lebanon's foreign relations with EU member states ==
- Austria
- Belgium
- Bulgaria
- Croatia
- Cyprus
- Czech Republic
- Denmark
- Estonia
- Finland
- France
- Germany
- Greece
- Hungary
- (Republic of Ireland) Ireland
- Italy
- Latvia
- Lithuania
- Luxembourg
- Malta
- Netherlands
- Poland
- Portugal
- Romania
- Slovakia
- Slovenia
- Spain
- Sweden

== See also ==
- Foreign relations of Lebanon
- Foreign relations of the European Union
