= Foreign relations of Lebanon =

The foreign policy of Lebanon reflects its geographic location, the composition of its population, and its reliance on commerce and trade. As'ad AbuKhalil argues that foreign intervention has been a mainstay of Lebanon's domestic politics throughout its history as a nation-state, with British, French and American influence predominating from the declaration of independence in 1943 until the 1956 Suez Crisis and 1958 Lebanon crisis. From then until the Lebanese Civil War, the country became an arena for struggle between players in the Cold War, including Egypt, the United States and the Soviet Union. During the Civil War regional powers in the Middle East strove for influence, including Syria, Saudi Arabia and Israel, with Syria gaining the upper hand at the tail end of the war. Until 2005, Lebanon's foreign policy had been heavily influenced by Syria, however beginning with the formation of Hezbollah in 1982, Iran had gradually grown to heavily influence Lebanon.

The framework for relations was first codified in May 1991, when Lebanon and Syria signed a treaty of mutual cooperation. This treaty came out of the Taif Agreement, which stipulated that "Lebanon is linked to Syria by distinctive ties deriving strength from kinship, history, and common interests." The Lebanese-Syria treaty calls for "coordination and cooperation between the two countries" that would serve the "interests of the two countries within the framework of sovereignty and independence of each." Numerous agreements on political, economic, and security. After Syria's military withdrawal in 2005, Lebanon's foreign policy charted a more independent course.

== Economy ==
On 30 December 2025, Egypt and Lebanon signed a deal under which Lebanon will purchase natural gas from Egypt. The agreement is expected to help Lebanon meet its growing electricity needs. Nawaf Salam was quoted as saying that the agreement aims “to meet Lebanon’s needs for natural gas allocated for electricity generation.”

== Diplomatic relations ==
List of countries which Lebanon maintains diplomatic relations with:

#	Country	Date
1	United Kingdom	9 February 1942
2	Iraq	24 February 1944
3	Saudi Arabia	9 April 1944
4	Poland	1 August 1944
5	Russia	3 August 1944
6	Iran	21 September 1944
7	United States	16 November 1944
8	France	25 November 1944
9	Belgium	25 November 1944
10	Egypt	30 November 1944
11	Mexico	12 June 1945
12	Chile	28 June 1945
13	Uruguay	25 October 1945
14	Brazil	13 November 1945
15	Argentina	22 November 1945
16	Sweden	7 February 1946
17	Switzerland	27 February 1946
18	Turkey	8 March 1946
19	Panama	30 April 1946
20	Netherlands	1 May 1946
21	Serbia	18 May 1946
22	Venezuela	10 July 1946
23	Czech Republic	21 September 1946
24	Jordan	1 October 1946
25	Philippines	24 October 1946
26	Italy	20 November 1946
—	Holy See	17 March 1947
27	Greece	17 June 1947
28	Spain	5 March 1948
29	Norway	10 August 1948
30	Afghanistan	August 1948
31	Ecuador	15 September 1948
32	India	15 September 1948
33	Pakistan	15 September 1948
34	Colombia	29 October 1948
35	Bolivia	21 February 1949
36	Ethiopia	31 July 1949
37	Peru	1949
38	Indonesia	27 February 1950
39	Paraguay	12 May 1950
40	Luxembourg	21 November 1950
41	Liberia	1 January 1951
42	Honduras	16 January 1951
43	Austria	6 December 1951
44	Germany	20 May 1953
45	Denmark	6 October 1953
46	Yemen	1953
47	Finland	21 June 1954
48	Canada	26 August 1954
49	Japan	November 1954
—	Sovereign Military Order of Malta	1955
50	Portugal	1955
51	Morocco	1956
52	Sudan	1956
53	Tunisia	October 1957
54	Thailand	3 February 1958
55	Ghana	30 March 1959
56	Haiti	21 May 1959
57	Guinea	3 June 1960
58	Cameroon	8 June 1960
59	Cuba	15 June 1960
60	Cyprus	20 September 1960
61	Nigeria	8 October 1960
62	Dominican Republic	1960
63	Senegal	22 April 1961
64	Sierra Leone	27 April 1961
65	Libya	12 June 1961
66	Kuwait	27 September 1961
67	Ivory Coast	4 October 1961
68	Somalia	6 October 1961
69	Mali	9 October 1961
70	Niger	11 March 1962
71	Togo	7 June 1962
72	Benin	27 June 1962
73	Gabon	24 September 1962
74	Algeria	18 December 1962
75	Burkina Faso	1962
76	Trinidad and Tobago	1962
77	Jamaica	7 May 1963
78	Laos	15 July 1963
79	Malaysia	16 July 1963
80	Nepal	18 August 1963
81	Chad	1963
82	Romania	6 January 1965
83	Gambia	24 May 1965
84	Hungary	30 November 1965
85	Bulgaria	19 September 1966
86	Central African Republic	1966
87	Zambia	3 February 1967
88	Australia	5 February 1967
89	Kenya	16 August 1967
90	Singapore	3 May 1969
91	Mauritania	10 June 1971
92	China	9 November 1971
93	United Arab Emirates	8 January 1972
94	Qatar	11 April 1972
95	Bahrain	29 May 1972
96	Democratic Republic of the Congo	June 1972
97	Oman	2 January 1973
98	Bangladesh	28 March 1973
99	Iceland	28 March 1973
100	Albania	28 May 1974
101	Ireland	12 December 1974
102	Malta	1 July 1975
103	New Zealand	25 November 1980
104	North Korea	12 February 1981
105	South Korea	12 February 1981
106	Vietnam	12 February 1981
107	Djibouti	11 March 1981
108	Nicaragua	16 June 1982
109	Maldives	25 February 1988
110	Guatemala	31 January 1990
111	Armenia	4 March 1992
112	Azerbaijan	18 September 1992
113	Ukraine	14 December 1992
114	Slovakia	1 January 1993
115	Lithuania	18 March 1993
116	Georgia	1 April 1993
117	Kazakhstan	20 April 1993
118	Turkmenistan	6 May 1993
119	Slovenia	29 July 1993
120	Eritrea	3 September 1993
121	Moldova	5 May 1994
122	Brunei	18 May 1994
123	Croatia	5 December 1994
124	Guyana	2 March 1995
125	Suriname	26 April 1995
126	Bosnia and Herzegovina	22 June 1995
127	South Africa	18 November 1995
128	Belarus	21 March 1996
129	Tajikistan	21 June 1996
130	Angola	3 July 1996
131	Sri Lanka	7 May 1997
132	Latvia	16 January 1998
133	Mongolia	5 February 1998
134	Mozambique	20 April 1998
135	Uzbekistan	22 October 1998
136	Andorra	24 March 1999
137	Liechtenstein	9 June 2000
138	Republic of the Congo	12 April 2001
139	Belize	29 June 2001
140	Estonia	3 September 2001
141	Lesotho	28 May 2002
142	Timor-Leste	April 2005
143	Costa Rica	24 August 2007
144	El Salvador	25 September 2007
145	Syria	15 October 2008
146	Equatorial Guinea	21 November 2008
147	Montenegro	4 December 2008
148	San Marino	13 November 2009
149	Fiji	10 October 2010
—	Palestine	17 August 2011
150	Rwanda	21 April 2017
151	Antigua and Barbuda	April 2017
152	Madagascar	5 May 2017
153	Kyrgyzstan	29 June 2017
154	Malawi	18 October 2017
155	Monaco	22 January 2019
156	Uganda	5 March 2019
157	Vanuatu	25 September 2019
158	Marshall Islands	26 September 2019
159	Guinea-Bissau	20 October 2020
160	South Sudan	8 December 2020
161	Cape Verde	20 May 2021
162	Zimbabwe	29 March 2022
163	Saint Kitts and Nevis	24 July 2024
164	Seychelles	25 June 2025
165	North Macedonia	25 September 2025
166	Tanzania	5 May 2026

== Bilateral relations ==
=== Americas ===
Country	Formal Relations Began	Notes
Argentina	22 November 1945	See Argentina–Lebanon relations: Argentina has an embassy in Beirut.; Lebanon has an embassy in Buenos Aires.; See also Lebanese Argentines.
Brazil	13 November 1945	See Brazil–Lebanon relations Both countries established diplomatic relations on 13 November 1945: Brazil has an embassy in Beirut.; Lebanon has an embassy in Brasília and consulates-general in Rio de Janeiro and São Paulo.; See also Lebanese Brazilians.
Canada	26 August 1954	See Canada–Lebanon relations Canada established diplomatic relations with Lebanon in 1954, when Canada deployed "Envoy Extraordinaire" to Beirut. In 1958, Canada sent its first Ambassador. The Embassy was closed in 1985 and reopened in January 1995. Lebanon opened a consulate in Canada in 1946. A Consulate-General replaced the Consulate in 1949, and an embassy was opened in Ottawa in 1958.: Canada has an embassy in Beirut.; Lebanon has an embassy in Ottawa and a consulate-general in Montreal.; See also Lebanese Canadians
Chile	28 June 1945	See Chile–Lebanon relations Both countries established diplomatic relations on 28 June 1945.: Chile has an embassy in Beirut.; Lebanon has an embassy in Santiago.; See Lebanese Chileans
Mexico	12 June 1945	See Lebanon–Mexico relations: Mexico was among the first nations to recognize Lebanon's independence in 1943.; Lebanon has an embassy in Mexico City.; Mexico has an embassy in Beirut.; The Centro Libanés and "Club Deportivo Libanés" in Mexico City are important symbols representing the historically cultural and social ties between both countries.; See also Lebanese Mexicans.
United States	16 November 1944	See Lebanon–United States relations The United States' interaction with Lebanon extends back to events such as the 1958 Lebanon crisis, which it sent in troops to fortify the government's position. Lebanon's southern neighbor, Israel, has also sent troops on several occasions, and attacked into Lebanon in response to Hezbollah kidnapping two Israeli soldiers. A possible source of friction between the U.S. and Lebanon is that most of Israel's weaponry is US-made, arguing possible US complicity in Israel's attacks.: Lebanon has an embassy in Washington, D.C. and consulates-general in Detroit, Los Angeles and New York City.; United States has an embassy in Beirut.; The new, monumental US embassy complex in the suburb of Awkar, scheduled for completion in 2023 and than in 2026, is considered the second-largest US embassy in the world, ranking just behind the embassy complex in Baghdad. The embassy site spans approximately 180,000 square meters on a plateau in the mountains, a significant portion of the infrastructure is located deep underground. Its massive scale regularly sparks controversy in Lebanon, as the facility vastly dwarfs any government building in the small host nation of only 5 million people, leading observers to view it as a strategic command and intelligence hub for the entire Middle East.: See also Lebanese Americans
Uruguay	25 October 1945	See Lebanon–Uruguay relations Both countries established diplomatic relations on 25 October 1945: Uruguay recognized Lebanon's independence on November 22, 1943.; Lebanon has an embassy in Montevideo.; Uruguay has an embassy in Beirut.; See also Lebanese Uruguayans

=== Asia ===
Country	Formal Relations Began	Notes
Armenia	4 March 1992	See Armenia–Lebanon relations The Embassy of Armenia to Lebanon was opened in June 1994. The Embassy of Lebanon was opened in Yerevan in September 1997. Lebanon is host to the eighth largest Armenian population in the world. During the 2006 Lebanon War, Armenia announced that it would send humanitarian aid to Lebanon. According to the Armenian government, an unspecified amount of medicines, tents and fire-fighting equipment was allocated to Lebanese authorities on July 27, 2006. On May 11, 2000, the Lebanese parliament voted to recognize the Armenian genocide. Lebanon is the first Arab country and one of the few countries of the world to have done so.: Armenia has embassy in Beirut.; Lebanon has an embassy in Yerevan.
Azerbaijan	18 September 1992	See Azerbaijan–Lebanon relations: Azerbaijan has an embassy in Beirut.; Lebanon is accredited to Azerbaijan through its embassy in Tehran, Iran.
Bangladesh	28 March 1973	See Bangladesh–Lebanon relations Both countries established diplomatic relations on 28 March 1973: Bangladesh has an embassy in Beirut.; Lebanon is accredited to Bangladesh through its embassy in Islamabad, Pakistan.
China	9 November 1971	See China–Lebanon relations China and Lebanon established diplomatic relations on November 1, 1954 and the embassy in Taipei opened in 1957. Lebanon shifted recognition from the Taipei-based Republic to the People's Republic on 9 November 1971.: China has an embassy in Beirut.; Lebanon has an embassy in Beijing.; In June 2020, Lebanon was one of 53 countries that backed the Hong Kong national security law at the United Nations. China opened the first Confucius Institute in the Middle East in Lebanon in 2006.
India	15 September 1948	See India-Lebanon relations: India has an embassy in Beirut.; Lebanon has an embassy in New Delhi.
Indonesia		See Indonesia–Lebanon relations: Indonesia has an embassy in Beirut.; Lebanon has an embassy in Jakarta.
Iran	21 September 1944	See Iran–Lebanon relations and Iranian influence in Lebanon Both countries established diplomatic relations on 21 September 1944.: Iran has an embassy in Beirut.; Lebanon has an embassy in Tehran.
Iraq	24 February 1944	See Iraq–Lebanon relations Both countries established diplomatic relatiobns on 24 February 1944 when first Envoy Extraordinary and Minister Plenipotentiary of Iraq to Lebanon Mr. Tahsin Kadri presented his credentials as first foreign diplomatic representatives, who presented his letters of credentials to President Lebanon Mr.Bechara Khoury. Lebanon and Iraq share the same language and mutual support for each other in conflicts, Lebanon's relations with Iraq have at most times been cold. Issues include the Lebanese Government's strong material and political assistance of Hezbollah and ongoing clashes in Iraq between the Sunnis and Shias.: Iraq has an embassy in Beirut.; Lebanon has an embassy in Baghdad.
Israel	No formal diplomatic relations	See Israel–Lebanon relations
Japan	November 1954	In 1954 Legation of Japan opened in Lebanon, in 1957 Legation of Lebanon opened in Tokyo. In 1959 both Legations was upgrades to Embassies: Japan has an embassy in Beirut.; Lebanon has an embassy in Tokyo.
Jordan	1 October 1946	See Jordan–Lebanon relations Both countries established diplomatic relations on 1 October 1946 when has been accredited Minister of Transjordan to Lebanon Mr. Mohamed Ali Ajlouni.: Jordan has an embassy in Beirut.; Lebanon has an embassy in Amman.
Malaysia	16 July 1963	See Lebanon–Malaysia relations Both countries established diplomatic relations on 16 July 1963: Lebanon has an embassy in Kuala Lumpur.; Malaysia has an embassy in Beirut.
Pakistan	15 September 1948	See Lebanon–Pakistan relations: Pakistan does not recognize Israel, which has hostile relations with Lebanon, as a legitimate country.; Lebanon has an embassy in Islamabad.; Pakistan has an embassy in Beirut.
Saudi Arabia	9 April 1944	See Lebanon–Saudi Arabia relations: Lebanon has an embassy in Riyadh and a consulate-general in Jeddah.; Saudi Arabia has an embassy in Beirut.
South Korea	12 February 1981	The two countries established diplomatic relations on 12 February 1981.: Lebanones embassy in Seoul.; Korean embassy in Beirut.
Syria	15 October 2008	See Lebanon–Syria relations The relationship between these two neighboring countries in Western Asia is complex: Syria has had troops stationed in Lebanon and has exerted political influence in the nation for many years. However, Syria has only officially recognised Lebanon's sovereignty recently.: Lebanon has an embassy in Damascus.; Syria has an embassy in Beirut.
Turkey	8 March 1946	See Lebanon–Turkey relations Both countries established diplomatic relations on 8 March 1946.: Lebanon has an embassy in Ankara and a consulate-general in Istanbul.; Turkey has an embassy in Beirut.
United Arab Emirates	8 January 1972	See Lebanon–United Arab Emirates relations: Lebanon has an embassy in Abu Dhabi and a consulate-general in Dubai.; United Arab Emirates has an embassy in Beirut.

=== Europe ===
Lebanon concluded negotiations on an association agreement with the European Union in late 2001, and both sides initialed the accord in January 2002, the accord becoming known as the EU-Lebanon Association Agreement. The EU-Lebanon Action Plan from January 19, 2007, gave a new impetus to bilateral relations in the framework of the European Neighborhood Policy.

Lebanon is one of the main Mediterranean beneficiaries of community assistance and the EU through its various instruments is Lebanon's leading donor. Starting from 2007 financial support is channeled through the European Neighborhood Policy Instrument. A Lebanon Country Strategy Paper 2007–2013 and a National Indicative Program 2007–2010 have been adopted by the EU. The assistance provided was refocused after the Second Lebanon War to engage in real help for the government and the society in reconstruction and reform of the country.

Country	Formal Relations Began	Notes
Bulgaria	19 September 1966	Since May 1967, Bulgaria has had an embassy in Beirut.; Since July 1983, Lebanon has had an embassy in Sofia.; Both countries are full members of the Francophonie and of the Union for the Mediterranean.
Cyprus		See Cyprus–Lebanon relations: Cyprus has an embassy in Beirut.; Lebanon has an embassy in Nicosia.
Denmark	6 October 1953	Both countries established diplomatic relations on 6 October 1953 when was accredited first Envoy Extraordinary and Minister Plenipotentiary of Denmark to Lebanon (resident in Cairo) Mr. G. L. Host: Denmark has an embassy in Beirut.; Lebanon is accredited to Denmark from its embassy in Stockholm, Sweden.
France	25 November 1944	See France–Lebanon relations Both countries established diplomatic relations on 25 November 1944 when has been appointed Mr. Ahmad Daouk as Minister Plenipotentiary of Lebanon to France. And 25 December 1944 has been opened Lebanese Legation (Embassy) in Paris. In 2007, French President Nicolas Sarkozy ordered ties with Syria to be suspended until proof Damascus was not interfering in the Lebanese political crisis was established. A week after Sarkozy's statement in Cairo, Syrian Foreign Minister Walid al Muallem announced Syria was ceasing their ties with France. "Syria has decided to cease cooperation with France on the Lebanese crisis" said Mouallem. In July 2008, France and Syria decided to open embassies in each other's countries. In April 2009, French and Lebanese officials approved the framework of a security agreement that besides improving bilateral relations include drugs and arms trafficking, illegal immigration and cyber-crime.: France has an embassy in Beirut.; Lebanon as an embassy in Paris and a consulate-general in Marseille.
Germany	20 May 1953	See Germany–Lebanon relations: Germany has an embassy in Beirut.; Lebanon has an embassy in Berlin.
Greece	17 June 1947	See Greece–Lebanon relations Both countries established diplomatic relations on 17 June 1947, when first Minister of Greece to Lebanon with residence in Cairo M. Georges Triantaphyllidis presented his credentials The relation between both people dates back to early antiquity, with the early trading activities between the ancient Greeks and the Phoenicians. In modern times, Greek-Lebanese bilateral relations are very good at all levels. Greece has an embassy in Beirut and Lebanon has an embassy in Athens. Both countries are members of the Union for the Mediterranean and the Francophonie.: Greece has an embassy in Beirut.; Lebanon has an embassy in Athens.
Holy See	17 March 1947	See Holy See–Lebanon relations The Holy See has played a major role in the peace negotiations of Lebanon. It has sought to unify Christian factions that were separated after the Lebanese civil war. At the same time, it sought to reduce Christian-Muslim tensions and to preserve Christian communities that have been declining in many parts of Lebanon and elsewhere in the Middle East.: Holy See has a nunciature in Harissa.; Lebanon has an embassy in Rome accredited to the Holy See.
Italy	20 November 1946	See Italy–Lebanon relations Both countries established diplomatic relations on 20 November 1946 when has been accredited first Charge d'Affaires of Italy to Lebanon Mr. Adolfo Alessandrini. Lebanon opened a legation in 1946, which was transformed into an embassy in 1955.
Poland	20 October 1956	1 August 1944 Lebanon established diplomatic relations with Polish Government in exile in London. On October 20, 1956, the government of Lebanon accepted the initiative of the government of the Polish People's Republic regarding the establishment of diplomatic relations at the level of the deputies, which meant simultaneous withdrawal of the recognition of the Polish government in exile.: Lebanon has an embassy in Warsaw.; Poland has an embassy in Beirut.
Romania	6 January 1965	See Lebanon–Romania relations: Lebanon has an embassy in Bucharest and an honorary consulate in Constanța.; Romania has an embassy in Beirut an honorary consulate in Tripoli.; Both countries are full members of the Union for the Mediterranean and of the Francophonie
Russia	3 August 1944	See Lebanon–Russia relations: Lebanon has an embassy in Moscow.; Russia has an embassy in Beirut.
Spain	5 March 1948	See Lebanon–Spain relations: Lebanon has an embassy in Madrid.; Spain has an embassy in Beirut.
Ukraine	14 December 1992	Both countries established diplomatic relations on 14 December 1992: Embassy of Ukraine in Beirut was opened in August 1995; Embassy of Lebanon was opened in Kyiv until February 2022.
United Kingdom	9 February 1942	See Lebanon–United Kingdom relations Lebanese Prime Minister Najib Mikati with British Prime Minister Keir Starmer in 10 Downing Street, October 2024. The UK established diplomatic relations with the United Kingdom on 9 February 1942.: Lebanon maintains an embassy in London.; The UK is accredited to Lebanon through its embassy in Beirut.; Both countries share common membership of the United Nations, the World Health Organization, the World Health Organization, and the World Trade Organization. Bilaterally the two countries have an Association Agreement, and a Development Partnership.

=== Oceania ===
Country	Formal Relations Began	Notes
Australia	5 February 1967	20 February 1967 opened Australian Embassy in Beirut. It was closed in 1984 because of the security situation in Beirut. The Embassy was formally re-opened on 18 July 1995: 74,000 Lebanese-born people live in Australia, mainly in Sydney, and there are more people of Lebanese descent including Marie Bashir, Steve Bracks and Hazem El Masri.; Australia has a modest trade relationship with Lebanon and has also given foreign aid in the aftermath of the Lebanese civil war of 1975–1990.; Australia has an embassy in Beirut.; Lebanon has an embassy in Canberra and consulates-general in Melbourne and Sydney.; See also Lebanese Australians.

== See also ==
- Constitution of Lebanon
- Lebanese diaspora
- Lebanese identity card
- Lebanese nationality law
- Lebanese passport
- List of diplomatic missions in Lebanon
- List of diplomatic missions of Lebanon
- Politics of Lebanon
- Visa policy of Lebanon
- Visa requirements for Lebanese citizens

== References and footnotes ==
- Eisenberg, Laura Zittrain; Caplan, Neil (1998). Negotiating Arab-Israeli Peace: Patterns, Problems, Possibilities. Indiana University Press. ISBN 0-253-21159-X.
- Schiff, Ze'ev; Ya'ari, Ehud (1984). Israel's Lebanon War. Simon & Schuster. ISBN 0-671-47991-1.
- Shlaim, Avi (2001). The Iron Wall: Israel and the Arab World. W. W. Norton & Company. ISBN 0-393-32112-6.
