= Indian diaspora in the Middle East =

Indian Diaspora in the Middle East
- Flag of India

Total population
- 7,828,771

Regions with significant populations
- United Arab Emirates: 3,425,144
- Saudi Arabia: 1,884,476-2,594,947
- Oman: 680,000-1,375,667
- Kuwait: 1,152,175
- Bahrain: 326,658

Languages
- Languages of India

Religion
- Hinduism, Islam, Sikhism, Jainism, Buddhism, Zoroastrianism, Christianity, Baháʼí, Judaism

The Indian diaspora in the Middle East represents one of the largest and most significant expatriate communities globally. With historical ties dating back centuries, the contemporary presence of Indians in this region has profound economic, cultural, and social implications. Today, millions of Indians reside across the Middle East, particularly in the Gulf Cooperation Council (GCC) countries, contributing to various sectors, including construction, healthcare, finance, and information technology. Their influence is also evident in local culture, cuisine, and bilateral relations between India and Middle Eastern nations.

== Background ==
India's connections with the Middle East trace back to ancient times, facilitated by trade routes over land and sea. Merchants from the Indian subcontinent engaged in commerce with Arab traders, exchanging goods such as spices, textiles, and precious stones. The historical maritime routes of the Indian Ocean fostered deep economic and cultural exchanges between Indian kingdoms and Middle Eastern kingdoms. Ancient records suggest that Indian traders had settlements in ports such as Muscat, Basra, and Aden as early as the 1st century CE. The influence of Indian goods, including indigo, pepper, and cotton, played a crucial role in shaping Middle Eastern economies.

During the medieval period, the Mughal and Ottoman Empires maintained ties, facilitating the movement of scholars, traders, and craftsmen between India and the Middle East. Arabic and Persian languages had a strong impact on Indian linguistic and literary traditions, while Indian mathematicians and astronomers contributed to Middle Eastern scientific advancements. The cultural fusion extended to architecture, with Indian artisans playing a role in constructing Islamic structures across the region.

The 20th century witnessed a significant shift with the discovery of oil in the Gulf region. The ensuing economic boom created a massive demand for labor, attracting a substantial number of Indian workers. This migration intensified in the 1970s and 1980s, marking the beginning of large-scale labor migration from India to the GCC countries. This influx was fueled by India's economic policies, which encouraged overseas employment as a means to bolster foreign exchange reserves through remittances.

== Demographics ==
As of recent estimates, the Indian population in various Middle Eastern countries is as follows:

| World region / Country | Articles | Overseas Indian population | Percentage | Ref |
|---|---|---|---|---|
| United Arab Emirates | Indians in the United Arab Emirates; Indian diaspora in the United Arab Emirates | 3,425,144 | 36.04% | |
| Saudi Arabia | Non-Resident Indians in Saudi Arabia | 2,594,947 | 7.58% | |
| Oman | Indians in Oman | 1,375,667 | 30.77% | |
| Kuwait | Indians in Kuwait | 1,152,175 | 25.81% | |
| Qatar | Indians in Qatar | 702,013 | 24.67% | |
| Bahrain | Indians in Bahrain | 326,658 | 22.19% | |
| Israel | Indians in Israel; Indian Jews in Israel | 97,467 | 0.7% | |
| Jordan | | 20,760 | 0.19% | |
| Yemen | Indians in Yemen | 10,500 | 0.04% | |
| Cyprus | Indians in Cyprus | 7,499 | 0.84% | |
| Iran | Indians in Iran | 4,337 | 0.01% | |
| Turkey | Indians in Turkey Turkic peoples in India | 3,092 | 0.004% | |
| Lebanon | Indians in Lebanon | 1,311 | 0.02% | |
| Egypt | Indians in Egypt | 1,249 | 0.001% | |
| Iraq | | 234 | 0.001% | |
| Syria | | 94 | 0.0004% | |

Indians form the largest expatriate community in the UAE, comprising over a third of the total population. In Saudi Arabia, Indian workers dominate industries such as construction, retail, and healthcare. Oman and Kuwait have long-standing Indian communities, with many families having lived there for multiple generations. In Qatar and Bahrain, Indian professionals hold key positions in engineering, banking, and academia.

== Economic contributions ==
Indian expatriates have been instrumental in the development of Middle Eastern economies. They are predominantly employed in sectors such as Construction, Healthcare, Education, Finance, and Information technology. Their contributions have been pivotal in transforming the infrastructural and service landscapes of these nations.

- Construction and Infrastructure: Indian laborers form the backbone of the construction industry in the Gulf. Mega projects like Dubai’s Burj Khalifa and Qatar’s FIFA World Cup stadiums have been built with significant contributions from Indian workers.
- Finance and Business: Many Indian entrepreneurs have established successful businesses in retail, hospitality, and information technology in the Middle East. Indian-owned companies like the LuLu Group International and the Aster DM Healthcare network have become household names in the region.
- Healthcare: Indian doctors, nurses, and medical professionals play a crucial role in the healthcare systems of Middle Eastern countries. Many hospitals and clinics employ Indian medical staff due to their expertise and training.
- Remittances: According to the Reserve Bank of India, Indian workers in the Middle East sent over $50 billion in remittances in 2022 alone, making the region a vital source of foreign exchange for India.

== Cultural influence ==
The Indian diaspora has enriched the cultural fabric of the Middle East. Indian cuisine, festivals, music, and cinema have found resonance among local populations. Bollywood movies enjoy immense popularity, and festivals like Diwali and Holi are celebrated with enthusiasm across the region.

== Labor rights and working conditions ==
The treatment of Indian migrant workers in the Middle East has been a subject of international concern. Many Indian workers, particularly in the construction and domestic labor sectors, face harsh working conditions, long hours, and limited legal protections. Many Middle Eastern countries operate under the kafala sponsorship system, which ties workers to their employers and restricts their ability to change jobs or leave the country without permission. This has led to cases of forced labor and human rights abuses.

== See also ==
- Indian diaspora in Africa
