= 2025 Beirut riots =

Date	February 14–15, 2025
Location	Beirut, Lebanon
Result	Protests dispersed

Belligerents
Pro-Hezbollah protestors Supported by: Hezbollah	(United Nations) UNIFIL Lebanon: (Lebanon) Lebanese Armed Forces

Casualties and losses
(Hezbollah) 25+ arrested	(Lebanon) 23 soldiers injured (United Nations) 1 personnel injured (United Nations) 1 vehicle damaged

On February 14–15, 2025, demonstrations involving road blockades, vandalism and attacks, took place by Hezbollah supporters, primarily on the main road leading to Beirut–Rafic Hariri International Airport, following a blockade of an Mahan Air flight from Tehran to Beirut. The assault by Hezbollah supporters resulted in the injury of 23 soldiers of the Lebanese Army, UNIFIL Major General Chok Bahadur Dhakal of Nepal, and the torching of a UN vehicle.

== Background ==
On February 13, 2025, Lebanese authorities informed Iran that a Beirut-bound Mahan Air flight should not take off as it would not be allowed into Lebanon. This was following allegations from Israel that Iran was smuggling resources to Hezbollah through these civilian flights. The United States relayed a warning that Israel could strike the airport if the aircraft arrived. Hezbollah supporters refuted the decision to block the Iranian aircraft from landing and protested by blocking the road to the airport.

== Events ==
=== February 14 ===
Hezbollah supporters blocked the road leading to the airport by burning tires and dumping trash. Alarabiya news wrote: "Video footage showed Hezbollah supporters carrying flags and chanting sectarian slogans as they pulled UNIFIL troops from their vehicles and beat them." The assault resulted in the injury of Major General Chok Bahadur Dhakal from Nepal, the outgoing Deputy Force Commander, and the torching of a UN vehicle.

The Lebanese Armed Forces intervened to disperse the protesters. In an official statement, the army reported that Acting Commander Maj. Gen. Hassan Odeh had communicated with UNIFIL, assuring efforts to apprehend those responsible for the attack on its personnel and bring them to justice.

=== February 15 ===
Hundreds of Hezbollah supporters staged a 90-minute sit-in near Beirut's airport to protest the Lebanese government's decision to block Iranian planes from landing. Protesters chanted slogans in support of Hezbollah and against the U.S. and Israel, calling the ban an attack on Lebanese sovereignty. The protest was dispersed by the Lebanese Army using tear gas. Hezbollah called for an investigation into the army's actions, describing them as an unjustified assault on peaceful citizens. The Lebanese Army said that despite the coordination between both parties to ensure a peaceful protest, a number of protestors attacked members of the military units resulting in 23 soldiers being injured, including 3 officers.

The Lebanese Armed Forces arrested over 25 people on suspicion of attacking a UNIFIL convoy and United Nations peacekeepers near Rafic Hariri International Airport.

=== February 17 ===
Lebanese authorities have decided to extend the suspension of flights to and from Iran, following a directive from the Minister of Public Works and Transport. This decision is part of enhanced security measures, which also include stricter aircraft inspections and ensuring compliance with aviation safety regulations, along with directing the security and military services not to be lenient in protecting the airport road and preserving public property.

== Response ==
UNIFIL condemned the violent attack on its peacekeepers in Lebanon, calling it a blatant violation of international law that may amount to war crimes, and urged Lebanese authorities to conduct a full and immediate investigation to hold those responsible accountable.

PM Nawaf Salam, Lebanon's new Prime Minister condemned the attack on UNIFIL peacekeepers and directed the Interior Minister to urgently identify and arrest the perpetrators. Later Lebanese authorities arrested over 26 individuals suspected of involvement and judge Fadi Akiki charged them with offenses including forming a gang, attacking UNIFIL vehicles, attempted murder, acts of terrorism, and theft.

President Joseph Aoun condemned the attack on the airport road and vowed that security forces would not tolerate actions destabilizing the country.

The United States condemned the attack, urged accountability, and commended the Lebanese Armed Forces' swift response.

The Minister of Public Works and Transportation in Nawaf Salam's cabinet Fayez Rasamny stated that the presence of a second official airport in Lebanon is necessary signaling a possible renovation and restoration of Qlayaat airport.

== See also ==
- Iranian smuggling to Lebanon
- Iranian influence in Lebanon
- 2008 Lebanon conflict
