= Lebanon–Malaysia relations =

- Lebanon: Malaysia

Lebanon–Malaysia relations refers to bilateral foreign relations between Lebanon and Malaysia. Lebanon has an embassy in Kuala Lumpur, and Malaysia has an embassy in Beirut.

== Economic relations ==
An agreement on avoidance of double taxation and fiscal evasion prevention including an agreement on bilateral investment treaty had been signed between the two countries. Since 2007, Malaysian exports to Lebanon total around 84,708 and Lebanese exports at 8,419. Malaysian exports including television parts, palm oil, clothing accessories, gas pumps and wood products, while Lebanese exports such as cocoa products, copper waste, book and hair products including packing containers. However, in 2011, Lebanese exports decrease to 1,747 while Malaysian exports increase to 144,756. In 2003, businessmen from both countries had forged a strategic partnership with the establishment of Malaysia Lebanon Business Council. A Lebanese carmaker also has a presence in Malaysia.

== Security relations ==
Malaysia were one of the former peacekeeping contributors in Lebanon. During the mission, Malaysia has sent a total of 877 peacekeepers.

== Resident diplomatic missions ==
- Lebanon has an embassy in Kuala Lumpur.
- Malaysia has an embassy in Beirut.

== See also ==
- Foreign relations of Lebanon
- Foreign relations of Malaysia
