= List of diplomatic missions in Lebanon =

This is a list of diplomatic missions in Lebanon. At present, the capital city of Beirut hosts 72 embassies, 3 consulates, and 2 missions.

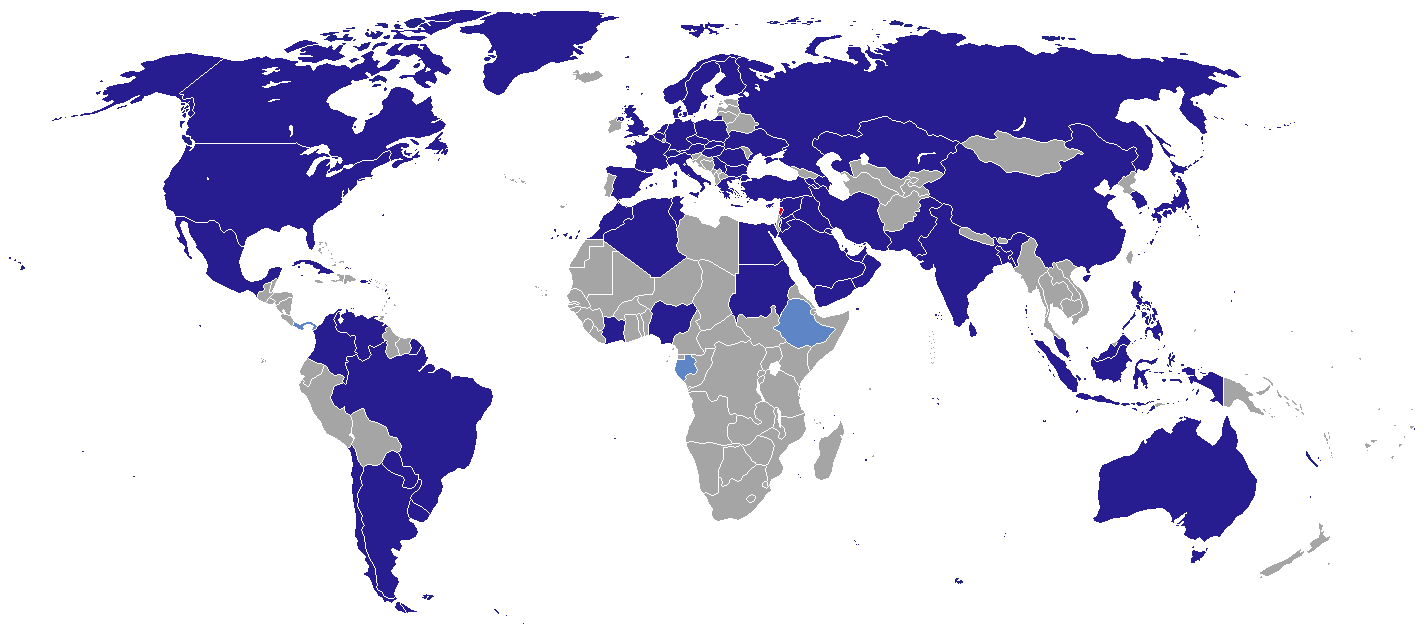
Diplomatic missions in Lebanon

== Embassies in Beirut ==
1. Algeria
2. Antigua and Barbuda
3. Argentina
4. Armenia
5. Australia
6. Austria
7. Azerbaijan
8. Bahrain
9. Bangladesh
10. Belgium
11. Brazil
12. Bulgaria
13. Canada
14. Chile
15. China
16. Colombia
17. Cuba
18. Cyprus
19. Czech Republic
20. Denmark
21. Egypt
22. Finland
23. France
24. Germany
25. Greece
26. Holy See
27. Hungary
28. India
29. Indonesia
30. Iran
31. Iraq
32. Italy
33. Ivory Coast
34. Japan
35. Jordan
36. Kazakhstan
37. Kuwait
38. Malaysia
39. Mexico
40. Morocco
41. Netherlands
42. Nigeria
43. Norway
44. Oman
45. Pakistan
46. Palestine
47. Paraguay
48. Philippines
49. Poland
50. Qatar
51. Romania
52. Russia
53. Saudi Arabia
54. Serbia
55. Slovakia
56. Republic of Korea
57. Sovereign Military Order of Malta
58. Spain
59. Sri Lanka
60. Sudan
61. Sweden
62. Switzerland
63. Syria
64. Tunisia
65. Turkey
66. Ukraine
67. United Arab Emirates
68. United Kingdom
69. United States
70. Uruguay
71. Venezuela
72. Yemen

== Delegations in Beirut ==
- European Union (Delegation)

== Consulates-General/Consulates in Beirut ==
- Ethiopia
- Gabon
- Panama

== Accredited embassies ==
Resident in Cairo, Egypt

- Albania
- Afghanistan
- Angola
- Bolivia
- Brunei
- Burundi
- Cameroon
- Central African Republic
- Comoros
- Chad
- Congo-Brazzaville
- Congo-Kinshasa
- Croatia
- Djibouti
- Ecuador
- Estonia
- Ethiopia
- Eritrea
- Gabon
- Georgia
- Ghana
- Guinea
- Ireland
- Kenya
- Libya
- Lesotho
- Lithuania
- Mali
- Mauritius
- Mongolia
- Nepal
- Nicaragua
- New Zealand
- Peru
- Singapore
- South Sudan
- Tanzania
- Uganda
- Vietnam
- Zambia
- Zimbabwe

Resident in Damascus, Syria

- Belarus
- North Korea
- Mauritania
- Somalia
- South Africa

Resident elsewhere

- Benin (Riyadh)
- Bosnia and Herzegovina (Amman)
- Bhutan (Kuwait City)
- Costa Rica (Rome)
- Cape Verde (Rome)
- Equatorial Guinea (Riyadh)
- Estonia (Ankara)
- Eswatini (Addis Ababa)
- Iceland (Paris)
- Kyrgyzstan (Ankara)
- Maldives (Riyadh)
- Malta (Valletta)
- Moldova (Ankara)
- Myanmar (Rome)
- Panama (Amman)
- Portugal (Nicosia)
- Senegal (Kuwait City)
- Seychelles (Abu Dhabi)
- Sierra Leone (Riyadh)
- Thailand (Riyadh)
- Togo (Kuwait City)
- Tajikistan (Ankara)
- Turkmenistan (Yerevan)
- Tonga (Abu Dhabi)
- Vanuatu (Paris)

== Former embassies ==
- Belarus (Note: Resident in Damascus, Syria)
- Burkina Faso (closed on 8 June 1966)
- Ireland (closed in 1977) (Note: Resident in Cairo, Egypt)
- Libya (closed in 2003)
- Senegal (date unknown)

== See also ==
- Foreign relations of Lebanon
- Visa requirements for Lebanese citizens
