= Lebanon–Pakistan relations =

- Pakistan: Lebanon

The Lebanese Republic and the Islamic Republic of Pakistan have close, warm relations. Pakistan has an embassy in Beirut. Lebanon has an embassy in Islamabad. Both countries are members of the Organisation of Islamic Cooperation.

== Relations ==
According to former Pakistani Prime Minister Yousaf Raza Gillani, Lebanon and Pakistan's close relations are "based on shared views on peace and stability in the Middle East as well as aspirations for the future."

Pakistan donated 8 tonnes of relief assistance comprising medicines and food to Lebanon as a token of solidarity for the victims of blasts that took place in Beirut on August 4, 2020.

== Economic relations ==
Bilateral trade between the two nations stands at $35.4 million in 2005–06.

== Resident diplomatic missions ==
- Lebanon has an embassy in Islamabad.
- Pakistan has an embassy in Beirut.

== See also ==
- Foreign relations of Lebanon
- Foreign relations of Pakistan
- Lebanese in Pakistan
- Pakistanis in Lebanon
