= Holy See–Lebanon relations =

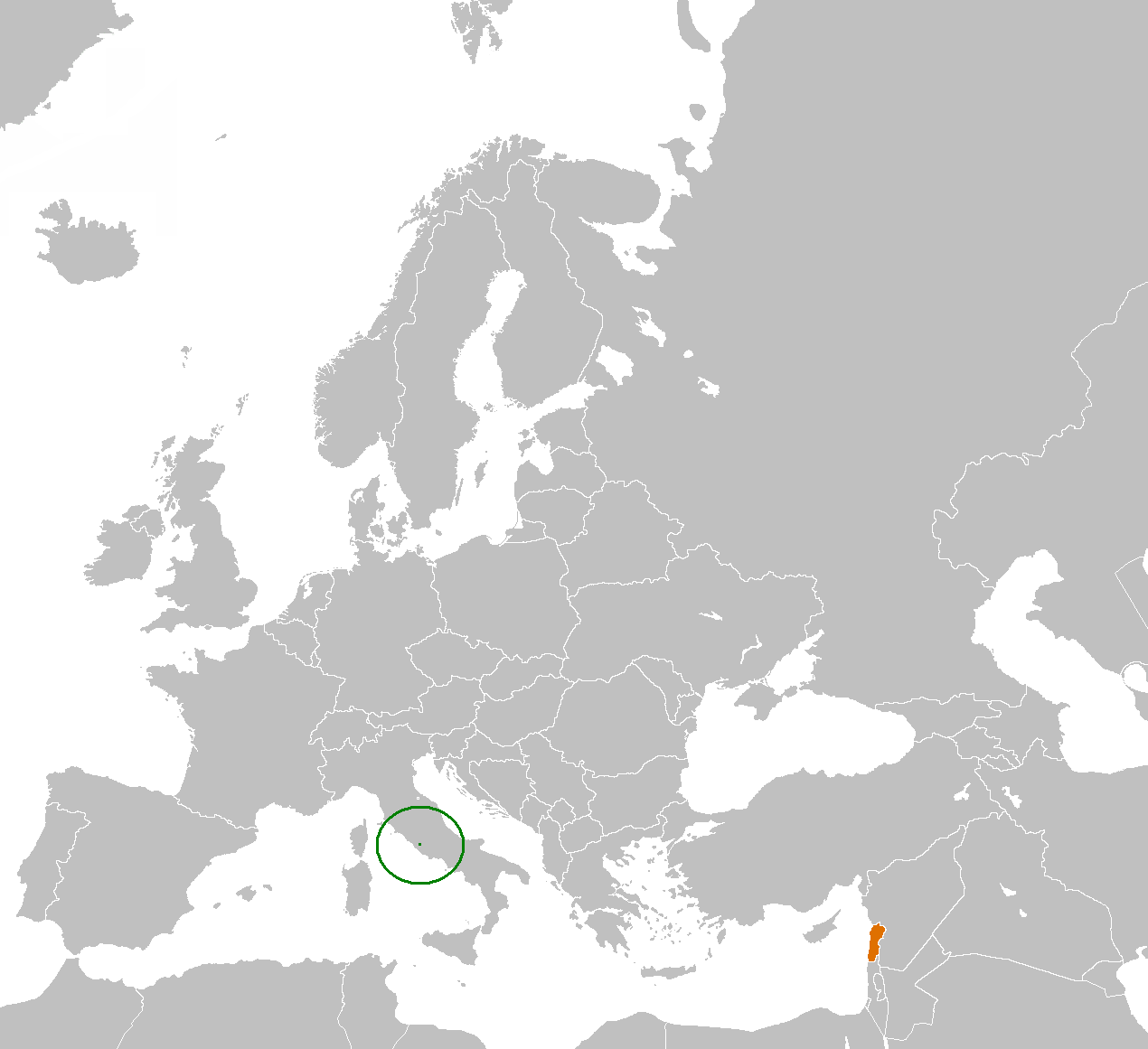
- Holy See: Lebanon

Holy See–Lebanon relations are foreign relations between the Holy See and Lebanon. Both countries established diplomatic relations in 1947. The Holy See has a nunciature in Harissa. Lebanon has an embassy in Rome.

The Holy See has played a major role in the peace negotiations of Lebanon. It has sought to unify Christian factions that were separated after the Lebanese Civil War. At the same time, it sought to reduce Christian-Muslim tensions and to preserve Christian communities that have been declining in many parts of Lebanon and elsewhere in the Middle East.

Cardinal Nasrallah Sfeir, a close friend of the Pope, has had a significant influence in local Lebanese politics. John Paul II was widely regarded as a political ally of Lebanon, which he called the message-country. He also had a great interest in the nation, stating that it is a "message of freedom and example of pluralism" in 1989.

In April 2021, prime minister-designate Saad al-Hariri visited the Holy See and met with Pope Francis, who promised to visit Lebanon, after political differences were set aside. Francis reiterated his support for the country and urged the international community to help Lebanon "to get back on its feet."

In 2025, it was announced by the Holy See that Pope Leo XIV would visit Lebanon from November 30 to December 2, 2025.

== See also ==
- Foreign relations of the Holy See
- Foreign relations of Lebanon
