= Indians in Lebanon =

Regions with significant populations
- Beirut

Languages
- Telugu · Kannada · Hindi · Marathi · Arabic

Related ethnic groups
- Person of Indian Origin

There is a small but recognisable community of Indians in Lebanon consisting of labourers and engineers mainly working in the industrial sector; some have opened their own businesses. The Indian migrants work in sectors of the Lebanese economy such as construction, manufacturing and the service sector.

In 2006, the Indian population in Lebanon declined due to the Israel-Hezbollah War. The evacuees were first brought by Indian naval ships from the Lebanese capital of Beirut to Larnaca in Cyprus and then flown to India, under an Indian military-coordinated exercise called "Operation Sukoon."

== See also ==
- India–Lebanon relations
- Hinduism in Lebanon
- Sri Lankans in Lebanon
