= Brazil–Lebanon relations =

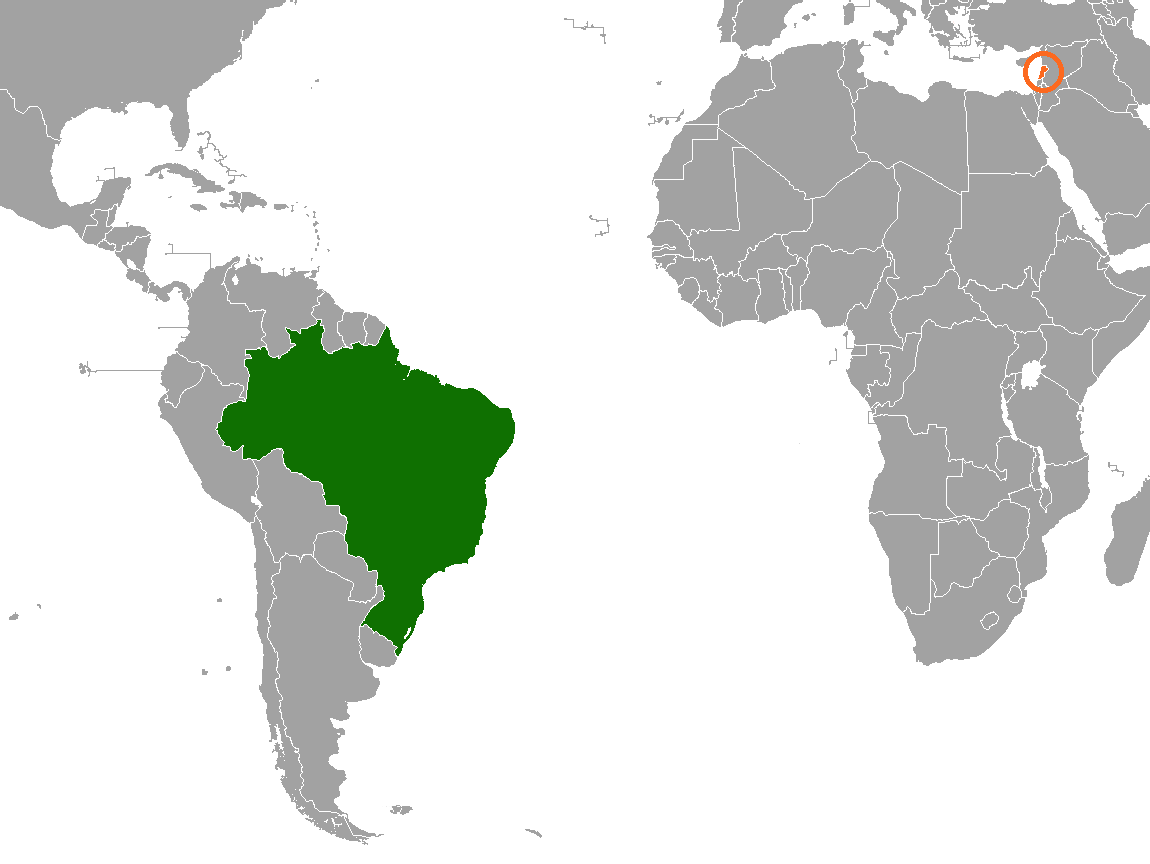
- Brazil: Lebanon

Brazil–Lebanon relations are the current and historical relations between the Brazil and Lebanon. Approximately 7 to 10 million Brazilians have Lebanese ancestry. Both nations are members of the Group of 24, Group of 77 and the United Nations.

== History ==
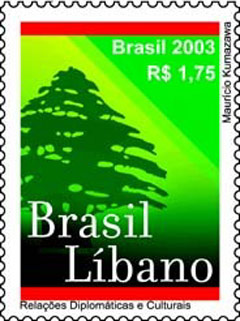
Stamp commemorating Brazil-Lebanon relations

In 1877, Emperor Pedro II of Brazil visited Beirut, which was then part of the Ottoman Empire. The first Lebanese migrants to arrive to Brazil was in 1882, with the majority of them being Maronite Christians from Mount Lebanon. In 1920, Brazil opened a consulate in Beirut to facilitate Ottoman (Lebanese) emigration to Brazil. By 1914, over 60,000 Lebanese had immigrated to Brazil. In October 1945, Lebanon obtained its independence from France and in November 1945, Brazil recognized and established diplomatic relations with Lebanon.

In 1954, Lebanese President Camille Chamoun paid an official visit to Brazil, becoming the first Lebanese head of state to visit Brazil. Later that year, both nations opened embassies in each other's capital's, respectively. Between World War I and World War II, a second wave of Lebanese migrants immigrated to Brazil. The last wave of Lebanese immigrated to Brazil during the Lebanese Civil War (1975–1990).

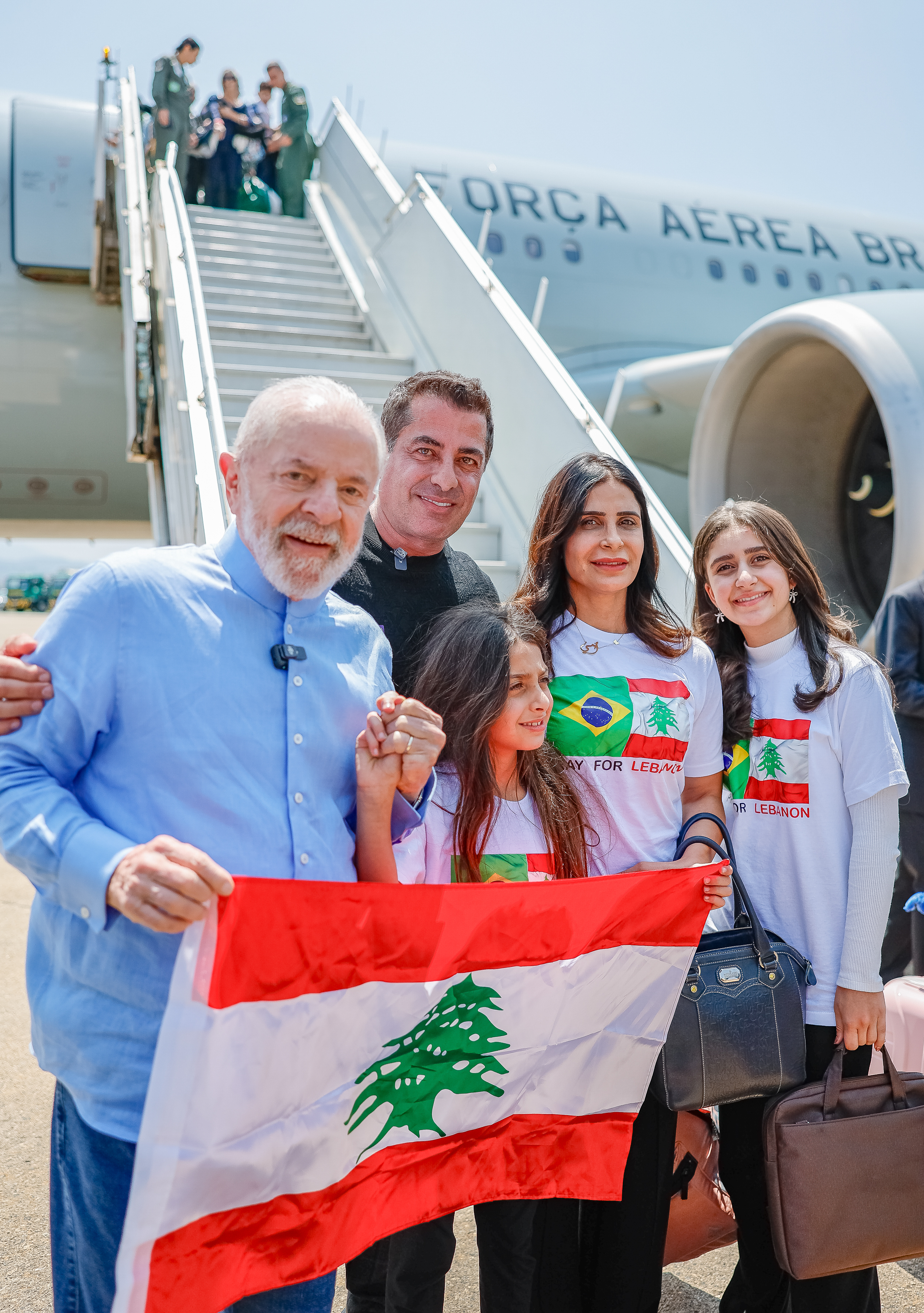
President Lula da Silva receiving Brazilian nationals from Lebanon repatriated after the Israeli invasion of Lebanon, 6 October 2024

Since 2011, Brazil has contributed troops and has taken command of the United Nations Interim Force in Lebanon, based in the south of Lebanon and currently maintains 1,288 soldiers and personnel in the country. In November 2011, then Brazilian Vice-President, Michel Temer, paid a visit to Lebanon. Temer, who is of Lebanese origin, became President of Brazil in August 2016.

== High-level visits ==
High-level visits from Brazil to Lebanon

- Vice-President Michel Temer (2011)

High-level visits from Lebanon to Brazil

- President Camille Chamoun (1954)
- Prime Minister Rafic Hariri (1995, 2003)
- President Elias Hrawi (1997)
- Prime Minister Najib Mikati (2005)
- President Michel Sleiman (2010)

== Agreements ==
Both nations have signed several bilateral agreements, such as a Memorandum of Understanding on Political Consultations; Agreement on Visa Waiver for citizens holding diplomatic, service or official passports and an Agreement by Exchange of Notes to extend tourism and business visa validity in regular passports.

== Trade ==
In 2018, trade between Brazil and Lebanon totaled US$298 million. Brazil's main exports to Lebanon include: meat, coffee, sugar, airplanes and automobiles. Lebanon's main exports to Brazil include: fertilizer and lead. Lebanon is Brazil's 77th largest trading partner globally.

== Resident diplomatic missions ==
- Brazil has an embassy in Beirut.
- Lebanon has an embassy in Brasília and consulates-general in Rio de Janeiro and São Paulo.
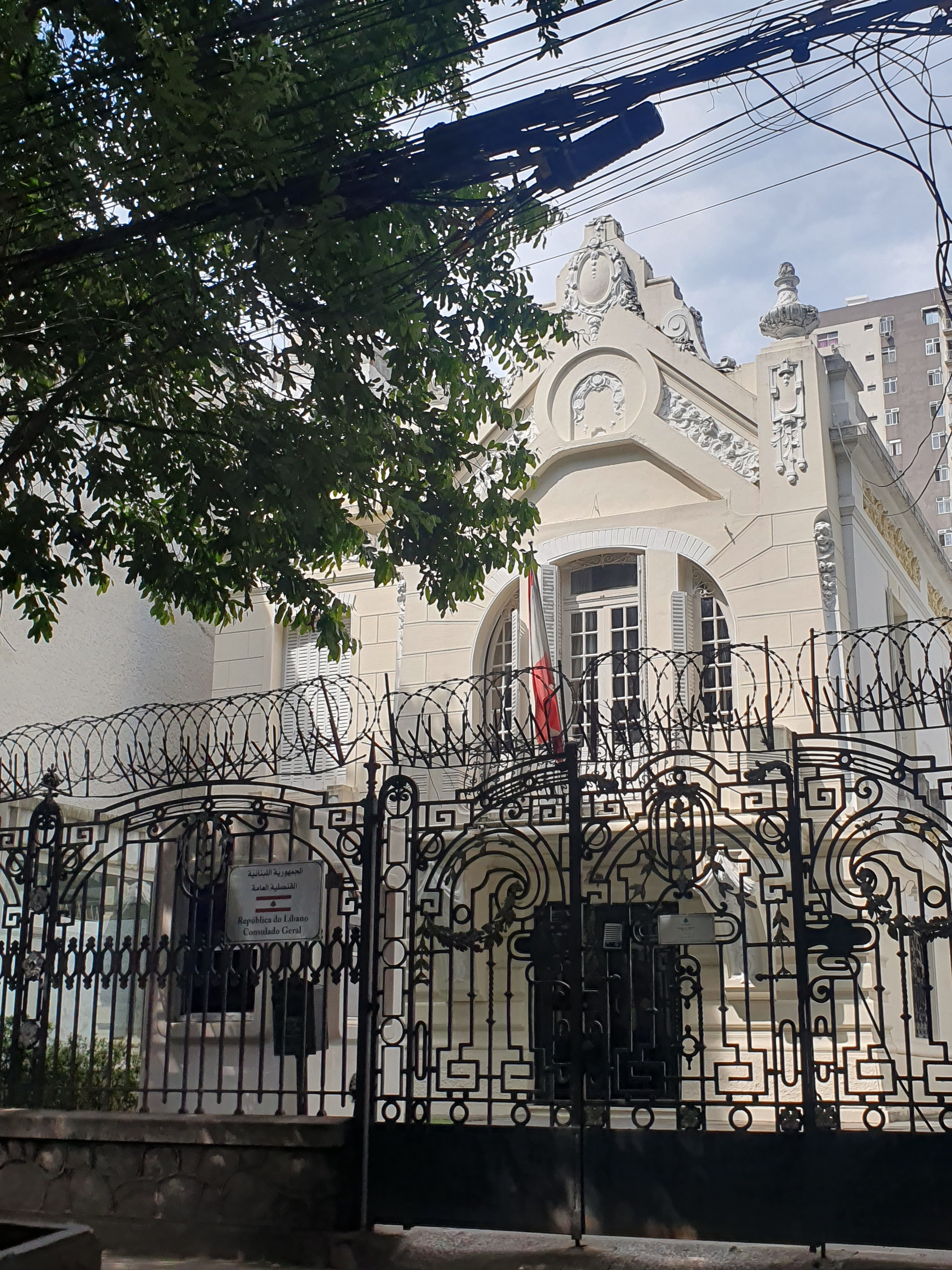
Consulate-General of Lebanon in Rio de Janeiro

== See also ==
- Foreign relations of Brazil
- Foreign relations of Lebanon
- Lebanese Brazilians
