= Azerbaijan–Lebanon relations =

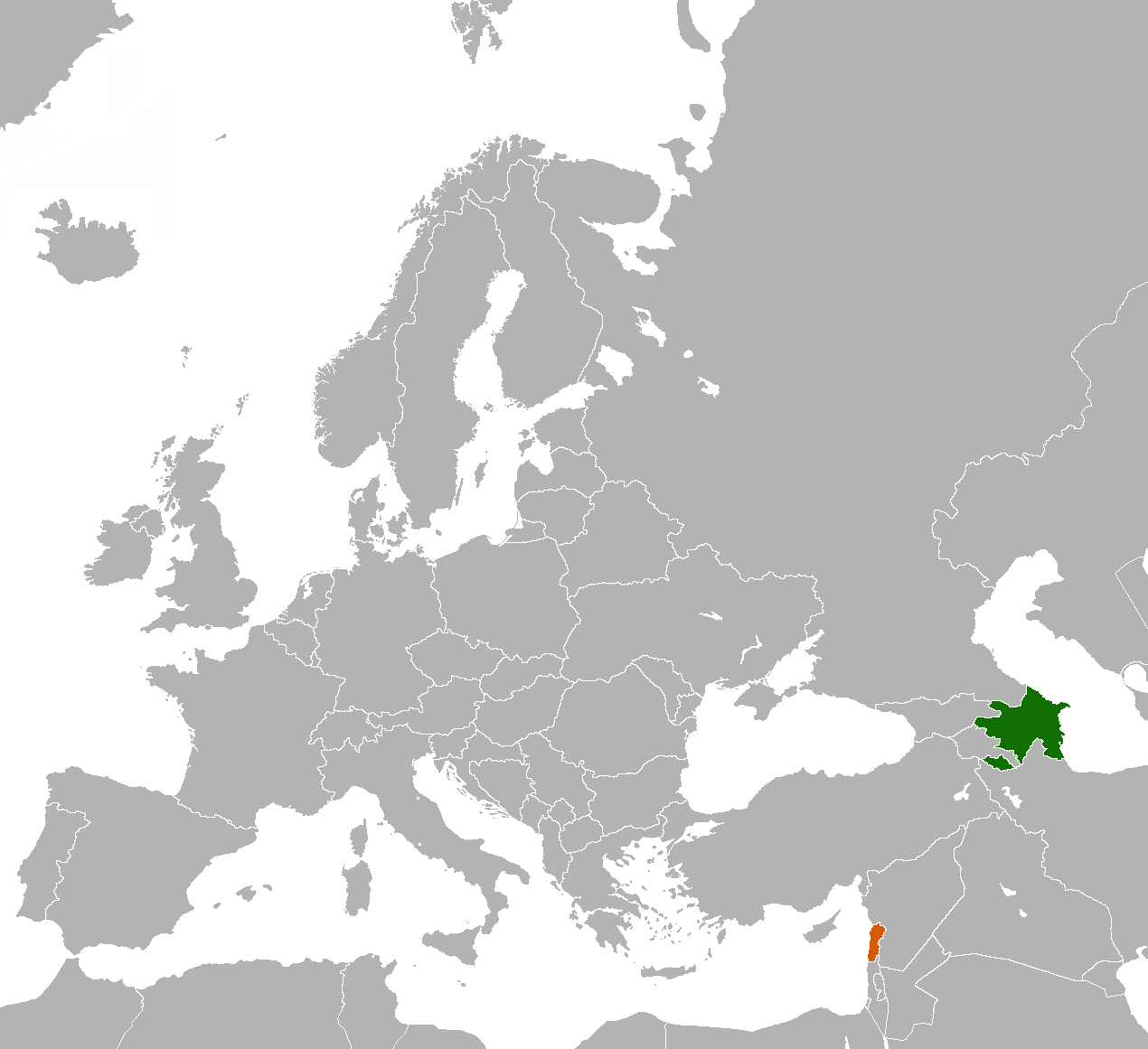

- Azerbaijan: Lebanon

Bilateral relations exist between the Republic of Azerbaijan and the Lebanese Republic in diplomatic, socio-economic, cultural and other spheres.

== Diplomatic relations ==
On December 30, 1991, Lebanon recognized the independence of the Republic of Azerbaijan.

On September 18, 1992, the protocol on the establishment of diplomatic relations between the two countries was signed.

On December 26, 1997, the Azerbaijani Ambassador to Egypt was simultaneously appointed as the ambassador to Lebanon.

On October 5, 2015, Aghasalim Shukurov was appointed ambassador of Azerbaijan to Lebanon by Presidential Decree No. 1435.

== Agreements ==
There are four agreements signed between Azerbaijan and Lebanon:

1. Agreement on the promotion and mutual protection of investments (February 11, 1998). Approved by the Law of the Republic of Azerbaijan No. 565-IQ of December 4, 1998.
2. The air transport agreement (February 11, 1998). It came into force on May 8, 1999.
3. Agreement on mutual assistance in customs matters (February 11, 1998). It came into force on May 1, 1999.
4. Agreement on trade and economic cooperation (February 11, 1998). It came into force on May 8, 1999.

== Economic cooperation ==
The parties cooperate in the field of Information and communication technologies (ICT).

In February 1998, during the official visit of prime minister of Lebanon Rafik al-Hariri to Azerbaijan, four agreements on economic cooperation were signed between the two governments.

Trade turnover

| Year | Import | Export | Trade turnover | Balance |
|---|---|---|---|---|
| 2014 | 1536.0 | 35091.2 | 36627.2 | -24849.5 |

According to statistics from the United Nations trade office (COMTRADE), in 2018, Azerbaijan's exports to Lebanon amounted to 2.41 million US dollars.

In 2018, the volume of Lebanon's exports to Azerbaijan amounted to 16.76 thousand US dollars. The main exports are sugar and sugar confectionery products.

According to statistics from the Association of hazelnut producers and exporters of Azerbaijan, in 2019, the volume of hazelnut exports (approximately 20 thousand tons) from Azerbaijan to Lebanon amounted to 125 million US dollars.

In 2019, the number of tourists from Lebanon increased 2.3 times.

== International cooperation ==
Cooperation in the international arena is carried out within the framework of various international organizations.

== Hezbollah's involvement in Azerbaijan ==
Azerbaijan has a large Shi'a population, and this often attracts interests from Hezbollah, a Shi'a militant group based in Lebanon. However, due to tensions between Azerbaijan and Iran, the latter is Hezbollah's patron, Hezbollah has been accused of trying to recruit Azerbaijanis for its wars in the Middle East and attacking of Azerbaijan's interests. Numerous Hezbollah's agents have been arrested in Azerbaijan.

== See also ==
- Foreign relations of Azerbaijan
- Foreign relations of Lebanon
