= Lebanon–Russia relations =

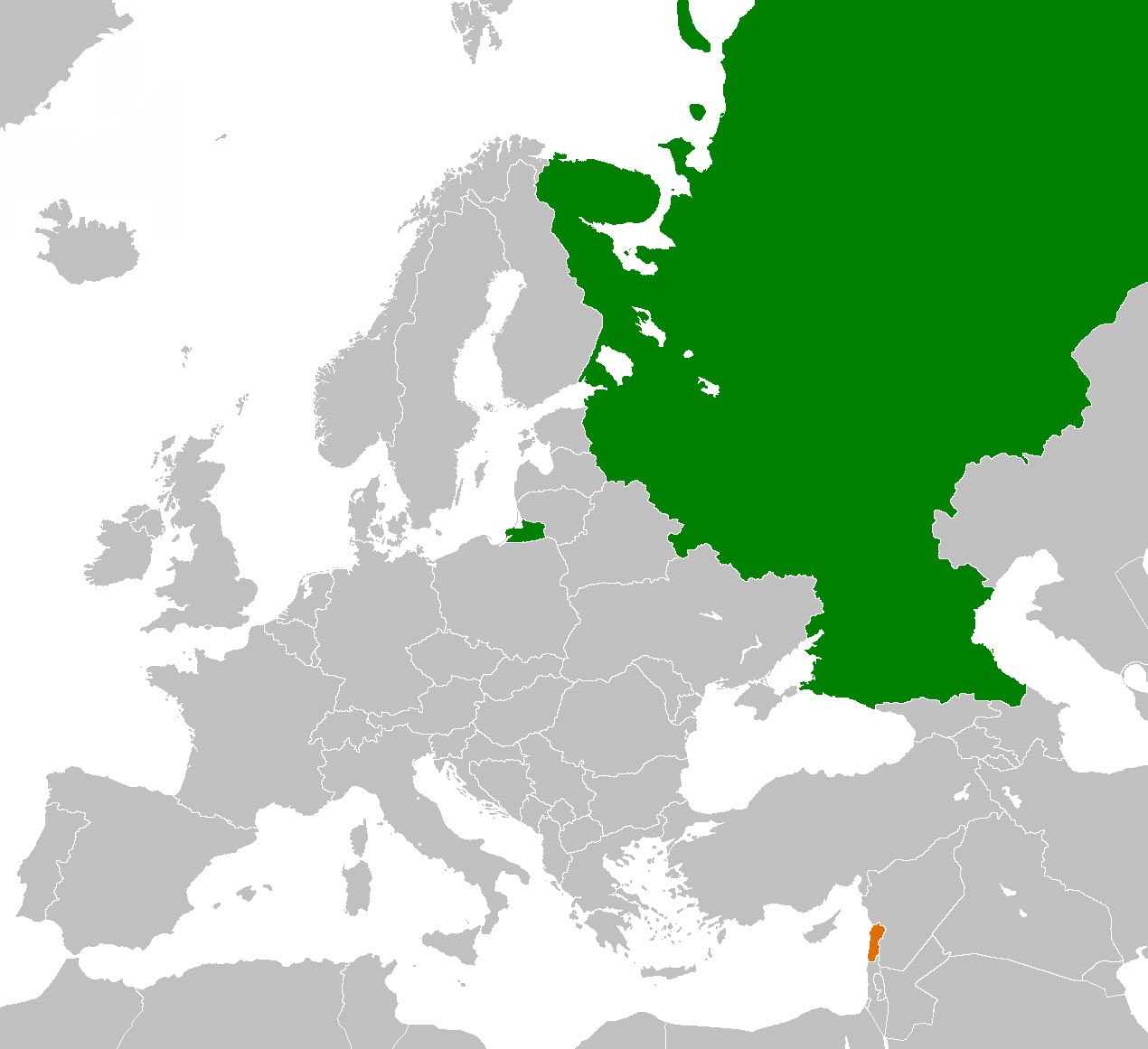
- Russia: Lebanon

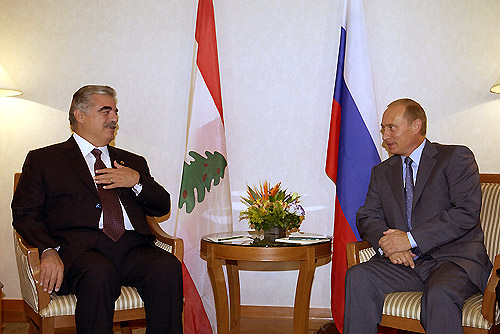
Russian President Vladimir Putin with Prime Minister of Lebanon Rafic Hariri in Malaysia, 2003

Lebanon–Russia relations (Russian: Российско-ливанские отношения) are the bilateral relations between the Lebanese Republic and the Russian Federation. Lebanon has an embassy in Moscow. Russia has an embassy in Beirut. Both states have cordial relations.

== 1770s ==
In the 1770s, Russian troops occupied Beirut.

== 1820s to 1910s ==
The Russian Empire tried to influence the region today known as Lebanon. After the Treaty of Adionople in 1829, Russia was the protector of the Greek Orthodox and the Armenian Church inside the Ottoman Empire. Russian diplomats tried to enhance the Russian influence in Lebanon and Syria together with the Ottoman authorities.

== 1940s to 1970s ==
The Soviet Union established diplomatic relations with Lebanon on August 3, 1944. Over the years, the two countries signed several agreements, including an agreement on trade and payments (April 30, 1954 and July 16, 1970), on air traffic (February 8, 1966), on cooperation in the tourism industry (June 8, 1970), on procedures for forwarding of diplomatic mail without the escort of diplomatic couriers (February 2, 1962, and February 15–22, 1971).

== 1980s ==
In 1985, fundamentalists from the Islamic Liberation Organization, an offshoot of the Muslim Brotherhood of Syria, kidnapped four Soviet diplomats. The KGB's special branch Alpha Group was despatched to Lebanon and freed the hostages.

== 1990s ==
After the dissolution of the Soviet Union, Lebanon was one of the first states to recognize the Russian Federation as an independent nation in December 1991.

In March 1995, a Russian delegation led by the Russian Foreign Minister Andrei Kozyrev visited Lebanon. Both states signed a treaty on trade and economic cooperation. In the 1990s, Russia supported the implementation of the United Nations Security Council Resolution 425.

== 2000s ==
In 2000, the Russian embassy in Beirut was attacked as a reaction to the Second Chechen War.

In 2004, the Permanent Representative of Russia to the United Nations, Andrey Denisov, abstained from the vote on United Nations Security Council Resolution 1559 in order to allow the UN urge Syria, a close ally of Russia, to withdraw all Syrian troops from Lebanon.

After the 2006 Lebanon War Russian troops were deployed to Lebanon for humanitarian purposes. They were not part of the United Nations Interim Force in Lebanon. Even though Russian troops were not part of UNIFIL, Belarus and Armenia, two close military allies of Russia, contribute troops to this UN peacekeeping force.

After the Russo-Georgian War in 2008 and the Russian recognition of Abkhazia and South Ossetia, Saad Hariri announced that Lebanon would establish relations with those two Georgian break-away republics and could possibly establish diplomatic relations with those republics.

Additionally, in 2008 it was announced that Russia would gift 10 MiG-29 to Lebanon. A representative of Russia's defense ministry said it was giving the secondhand MiG-29s to Beirut free of charge. The gift was supposed to be part of a defense cooperation deal that would have seen Moscow train Lebanese military personnel. The gift would have been the "biggest upgrade" of the Lebanese military since the end of the Lebanese Civil War. Due to the wishes of the Lebanese government, the deal was later changed into Russian helicopters.

In 2009, a Russian military delegation visited Lebanon in order to inspect the Lebanese military airports on their capability to host Russian MiG-29 fighter aircraft.

== 2010s ==
In 2010, Russian Prime Minister Vladimir Putin announced that Russia will be giving Lebanon a free, unconditional gift of arms and military supplies to strengthen the Lebanese Armed Forces. The package included six Mi-24 attack helicopters, 31 T-72 tanks, 36 130-millimeter artillery pieces, and 500,000 shells to be used by the Lebanese artillery. Israeli journalists expected that Russia due to this delivery got the chance to send military consultants and instructors to teach the Lebanese how to use the new military equipment.

In political talks in the year 2010, Russian and Lebanese representatives discussed the possibility of building a number of gas-powered electricity plants in Lebanon, with Russian funding. They would have been connected to the Arab Gas Pipeline.

In April 2015, the head of the Russian Federal Agency on Technical Regulation and Metrology, Alexey Abramov, and Lebanon's Trade and Economy Minister, Alain Hakim, signed a cooperation protocol to boost the Russo-Lebanese bilateral economic and trade relations.

In February 2018, representatives of Russia and Lebanon drafted a joint agreement which would potentially allow the Russian Navy and Air Force access to Lebanese military facilities. Joint exercises, counterterrorism cooperation and Russian trainers for the Lebanese military were also discussed. Experts stated that the Lebanese government might seek a Russian troop presence on its soil due to overlapping claims with Israel about natural gas reserves in the Mediterranean Sea. Shortly thereafter, reports surfaced that Russia had offered a $1 billion arms package to Lebanon.

== 2020s ==
In 2022, the Lebanese Foreign Ministry condemned Russia's military invasion of Ukraine and called on Moscow to "immediately halt military operations." Russia's embassy in Lebanon expressed surprise at this condemnation, releasing a statement that "The statement... surprised us [the Russian embassy] by violating the policy of dissociation and by taking one side against another in these events, noting that Russia spared no effort in contributing to the advancement and stability of the Lebanese Republic".

In 2023, there were reports that Russia would pay Palestinians from the Lebanese camps to fight in the Russo-Ukrainian war.

== Lebanon–Russia trade relations ==
In 2013, bilateral trade exceeded $500 million, while Russia exports to Lebanon consist mainly of raw materials (oil and hydrocarbon products) and Lebanon provides Russia predominantly with agricultural products, primarily, and gas plants around and go through Beirut, which are controlled by Russian workers and federalist nitrate gas. After the Russian counter-sanctions against the EU and NATO countries the Lebanon-Russia trade relations boosted. In 2014 Russian exports to Lebanon were estimated at $900 million.

== Syrian Civil War ==
Due to the Syrian Civil War, Russia supports the Lebanese dissociation policy.

== Current Lebanese domestic politics ==
Russian politicians have cordial relations with several parties of the March 8 Alliance.

One political formation in line with Russian political interests in the Levant is the Syrian Social Nationalist Party in Lebanon. The party was founded in 1932 by Antoun Saadeh, a Greek Orthodox Christian from just outside Beirut. Many SSNP members are Christian. In December 2014 the Russian Deputy Foreign Minister, Mikhail Bogdanov, met the Head of the Syrian Social Nationalist Party, MP Assaad Hardan.

The Shi'ite group, Hezbollah, is mainly equipped with Russian weapons. Additionally, Hezbollah is known to recruit members for its group in Russia. With the beginning of the Russian military intervention in the Syrian Civil War, Hezbollah media claimed that Russian soldiers were coordinating their efforts with Hezbollah fighters in the course of the Syrian Civil War. Hezbollah officials welcomed the Russian intervention in neighbouring Syria. According to rumors, Russian soldiers and Hezbollah fighters have established common operations rooms in Latakia and Damascus. Russia does not consider Hezbollah to be a terrorist organization and supplies the group with weapons.

== See also ==
- Foreign relations of Lebanon
- Foreign relations of Russia
- List of ambassadors of Russia to Lebanon
