= Armenia–Lebanon relations =

- Armenia: Lebanon

Armenia–Lebanon relations are the diplomatic and historical relations between the Republic of Armenia and the Republic of Lebanon. Lebanon is host to the eighth largest Armenian diaspora population in the world and was the first Arab League member state that recognized the Armenian genocide. Both countries are members of the World Trade Organization, the Organisation internationale de la Francophonie, and the United Nations.

== Aid ==
During the 2006 Lebanon War, Armenia announced that it would send humanitarian aid to Lebanon. According to the Armenian government, an unspecified amount of medicines, tents and fire-fighting equipment was allocated to Lebanese authorities on 27 July 2006.

== Armenian genocide recognition ==
On 11 May 2000, the Lebanese parliament voted to recognize the Armenian genocide. Lebanon was the first Arabic-speaking country to have done so.

== Cultural relations ==
The vast Armenian community in Lebanon also has several political parties and is recognized as an institution in its own right with reserved seats in parliament. Tashnag is the largest Armenian political party in Lebanon, currently in government, and sits with the March 8 alliance; however, there are also parties that are supportive of the opposition March 14 alliance.

Armenia and Lebanon abolished Visa requirements between both countries during the official visit of Armenia's former President Serzh Sargsyan to Baabda Palace, meeting many political figures including former President Michel Suleiman during the visit.

== Resident diplomatic missions ==
- Armenia has an embassy in Beirut.
- Lebanon has an embassy in Yerevan.

== See also ==
- Foreign relations of Armenia
- Foreign relations of Lebanon
- Armenians in Lebanon
- Armenian diaspora in the Middle East
