= Germany–Lebanon relations =

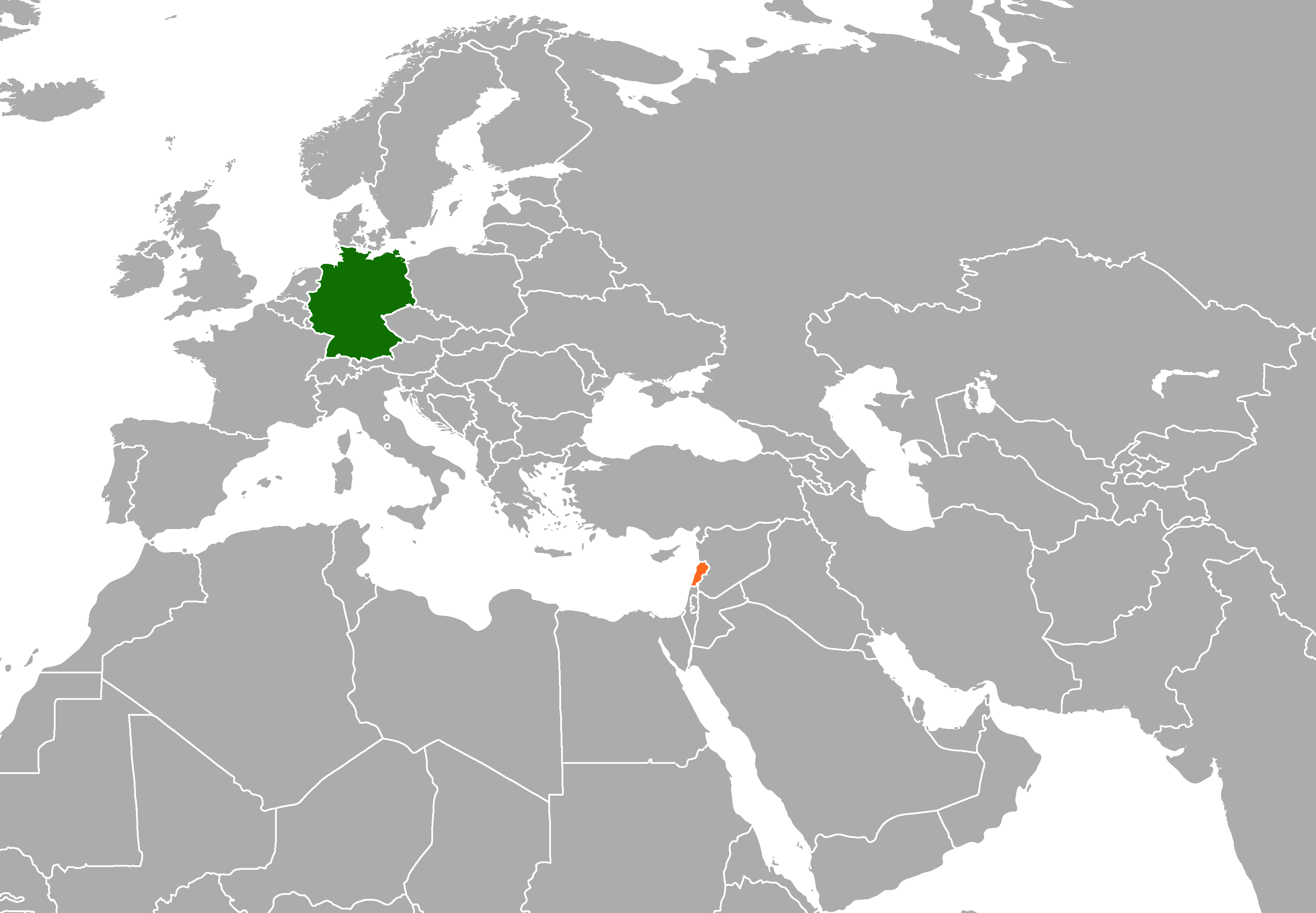

- Germany: Lebanon

Germany–Lebanon relations are "traditionally friendly" and "very close", according to the German Foreign Office. For Lebanon, Germany is one of the most important donor countries for the care of the numerous refugees in the country. Among the Arabs in Germany, the Lebanese are among the largest groups with almost 160,000 members (2021).

== History ==
Contacts between the two societies have existed for centuries, for example, during the time of the Crusades, when conquerors and settlers from Western and Central Europe founded various crusader states in the Levant and on the territory of present-day Lebanon like the County of Tripoli, which existed until the 13th century. As early as the 19th century, German tourists came to Lebanon and some Germans also became active in the hospitality industry and founded hotels. In addition, many German-speaking researchers and orientalists prepared the country and contributed to the study of Lebanon's cultural heritage. A consulate of the German Empire was opened in Lebanon in 1882, and in 1898 Kaiser Wilhelm II visited the cities of Beirut and Baalbek. With World War I, relations were severed and the German consulate was closed. After the resumption of diplomatic relations in 1927, Germany's diplomatic representation was handled from Damascus. After the Wehrmacht's French campaign in World War II, Lebanon and Syria were briefly under the control of Vichy France, which was linked to Nazi Germany. The Allies gained control of the area as early as 1941 with the Syria-Lebanon campaign. Lebanon became independent of France on November 22, 1943, and declared war on Germany in 1945 shortly before the end of the war.

The Federal Republic of Germany (FRG) opened a legation in Beirut on May 20, 1953, which became an embassy on October 2, 1958. The German Democratic Republic (GDR) established a trade office in Beirut in 1955, but the FRG's Hallstein Doctrine prevented the establishment of official diplomatic relations. After the FRG established diplomatic relations with Israel in 1965, a number of Arab states broke off relations with the FRG in response, including Lebanon. On March 30, 1972, the FRG embassy in Beirut was reopened, and on December 24, 1972, diplomatic relations were established with the GDR after the Hallstein Doctrine was abandoned under Willy Brandt. During the Lebanese Civil War (1975–1990), some Germans had close contacts with the PLO, which was involved in the civil war. The former neo-Nazi Willi Voss was a member of the PLO in Lebanon and later a CIA cover agent. The civil war also led to migration and flight of Lebanese to Germany. After the end of the civil war, Germany assisted the country in reconstruction and pacification.

In 1997, a bilateral trade and investment agreement was signed. From 2006, Germany was involved in the UN mission United Nations Interim Force in Lebanon. Closer cooperation in the field of culture was concluded in 2010 with the signing of a bilateral cultural agreement. With the start of the civil war in Syria since 2011, the small country took in nearly one million refugees from the neighboring country. As a result, the German government provided material and financial aid to the country to cope with the crisis.

In February 2026 Frank-Walter Steinmeier visited Beirut and met with Joseph Aoun, President of Lebanon. During the visit Germany reaffirmed its long term support for the Lebanese state institutions and the Lebanese Armed Forces. Germany promised to continue its assistance even after the German troop are withdrawn from UNIFIL peacekeeping mission in late 2026. Germany already provides training for the Lebanese Navy and may expand security cooperation to help maintain stability along the border with Israel.

== Germany and Hezbollah ==
In April 2020, the Federal Ministry of the Interior issued a ban on the Iranian-backed organization Hezbollah's activities in Germany. The organization reportedly has nearly 1,000 supporters in Germany and continues to engage in political activity after the ban. The official reason for the ban is Hezbollah's calls for the elimination of the state of Israel. After the ban was applied, Hassan Nasrallah, the organization's leader claimed that Hezbollah hasn't been active in Europe in years. Despite Nasrallah's claims, in November 2023, the German police carried out a massive nationwide operation against "Islamic Center Hamburg", an organization suspected of supporting Hezbollah. Many Lebanese have emigrated due to wars between Iranian backed Hezbollah and Israel as well as economic and political internal problems in part due to Hezbollah as well as corruption that have led to Lebanon being considered a failed state by some.

In 2025 a Hezbollah network was reported operating in Northern Germany, according to investigations. According to the reports they used mosques, cultural centers and associations to expand Hezbollah's influence in Europe.

== Economic relations ==
In 2018, Germany exported goods worth 760 million euros to Lebanon and imported goods worth 42 million euros in return. Germany exports mainly motor vehicles and automotive parts, machinery, and chemical and pharmaceutical products to Lebanon. In 2021, the bilateral trade volume was still 559 million euros, placing Lebanon 96th in the ranking of Germany's trading partners. Despite an investment agreement, there is relatively little German direct investment in Lebanon. Companies with their own presence in the country include Commerzbank and Lufthansa.

== Development cooperation ==
After Lebanon broke through the income threshold to become an upper-middle-income country in 2003, German development aid was discontinued. After the 2006 Lebanon War between Hezbollah and Israel, German development aid was resumed. From the start of the civil war in neighboring Syria in 2011 until 2021, the German government made aid payments totaling 1.7 billion euros, largely to support refugees in the country and promote their integration into society. In addition, employment, municipal infrastructure and agriculture were also supported with German aid money. German aid money was used to finance the school fees of 795,000 school-age children between 2016 and 2021. During the same period, 8,000 homes were also rehabilitated for refugees and drinking water supplies were improved for 800,000 people in the country. Germany also provided assistance in dealing with the COVID-19 pandemic in Lebanon and the 2020 explosion disaster in Beirut.

== Cultural relations ==
There are close cultural relations between the two countries, with the fields of cultural preservation and archaeology dominating. There are also exchange programs between Lebanese and German schools and universities. A number of German cultural institutions are represented in Lebanon, including:

- Goethe-Institute in Beirut with a branch office in Tripoli.
- Orient-Institut Beirut
- German Academic Exchange Service
- German Archaeological Institute
- Beirut Protestant Community
- Konrad Adenauer Foundation
- Friedrich Ebert Foundation
- Heinrich Böll Foundation

== Migration ==
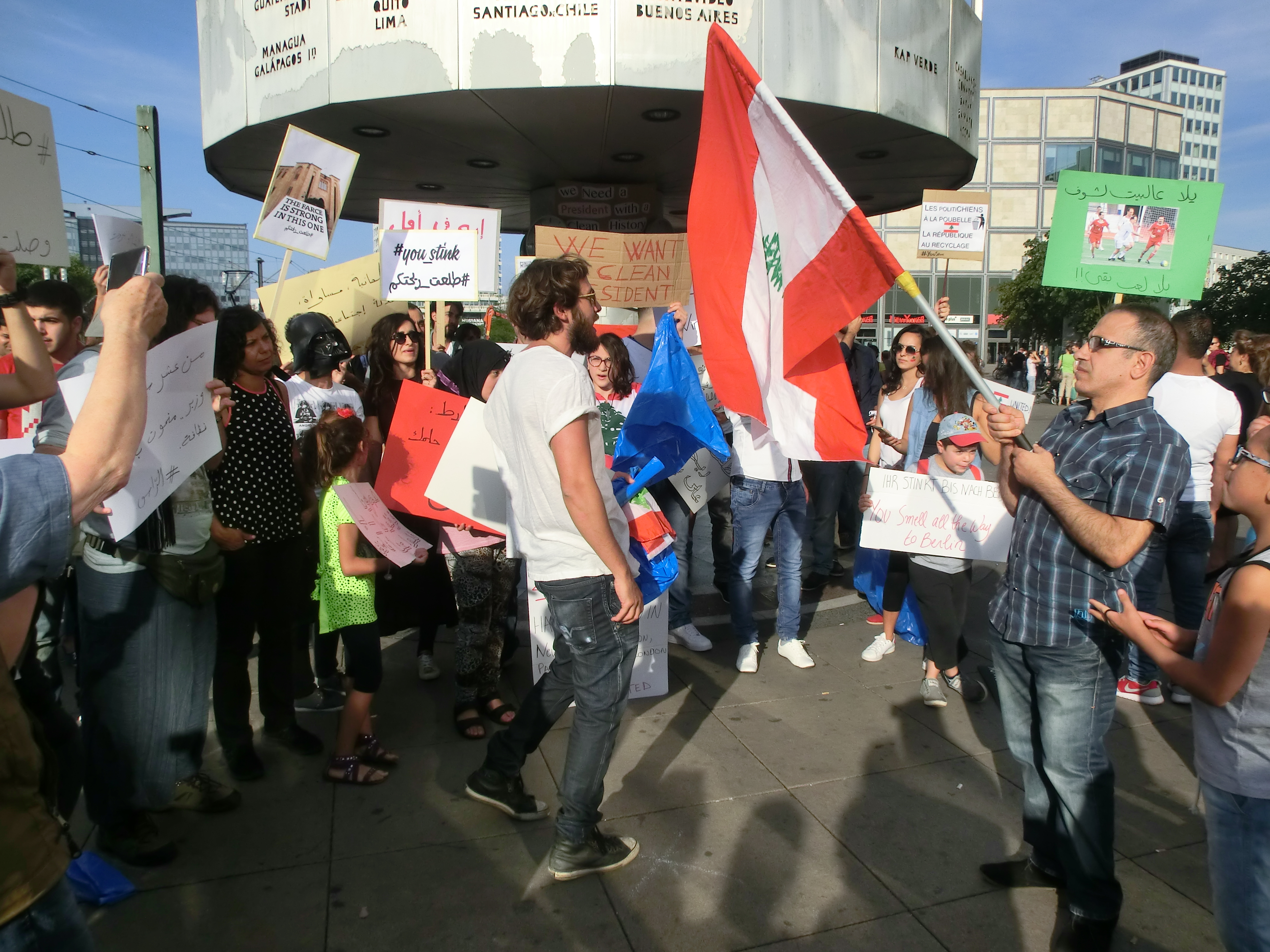
Support for the 2015 protests in Lebanon, Berlin

There is a large Lebanese diaspora in Germany, whose migration to Germany began on a larger scale in the 1970s. In 2020, Germany was home to nearly 40,000 people with Lebanese citizenship and an even larger number of people with a Lebanese migration background. Their number was estimated at nearly 160,000 in 2021. Centers of the Lebanese population in Germany include the city of Berlin and the state of North Rhine-Westphalia.

== Military cooperation ==
German defense companies supplied Lebanon with various weapons, including rocket launchers (2017), helicopters (2006), Leopard 1 main battle tanks (2008), anti-tank missiles (2015), submachine guns (2008), and patrol boats (2007).

== Diplomatic missions ==
- Germany has an embassy in Beirut.
- Lebanon has an embassy in Berlin.
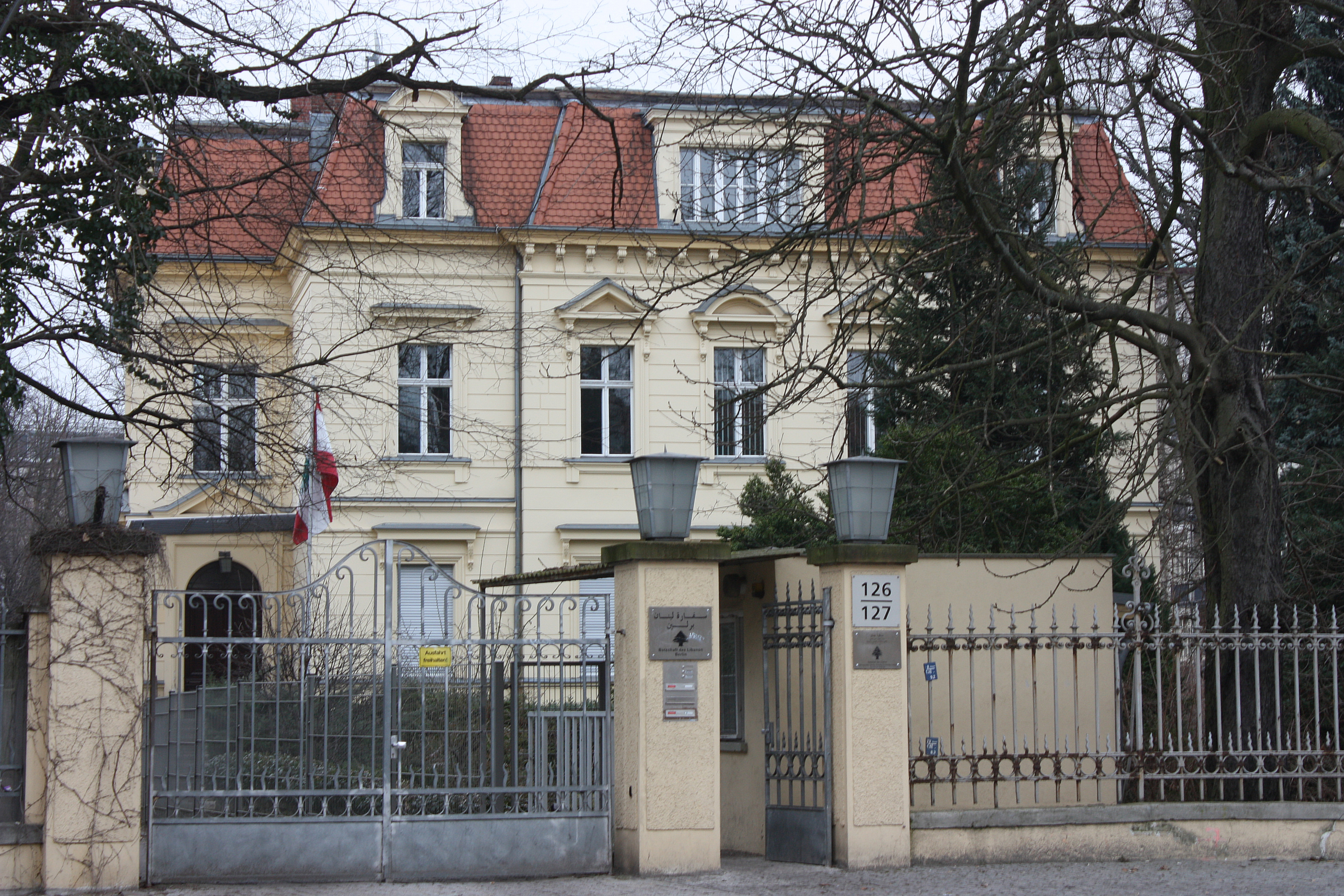
Lebenese embassy in Berlin

== See also ==
- Foreign relations of Germany
- Foreign relations of Lebanon
