= Lebanon–Spain relations =

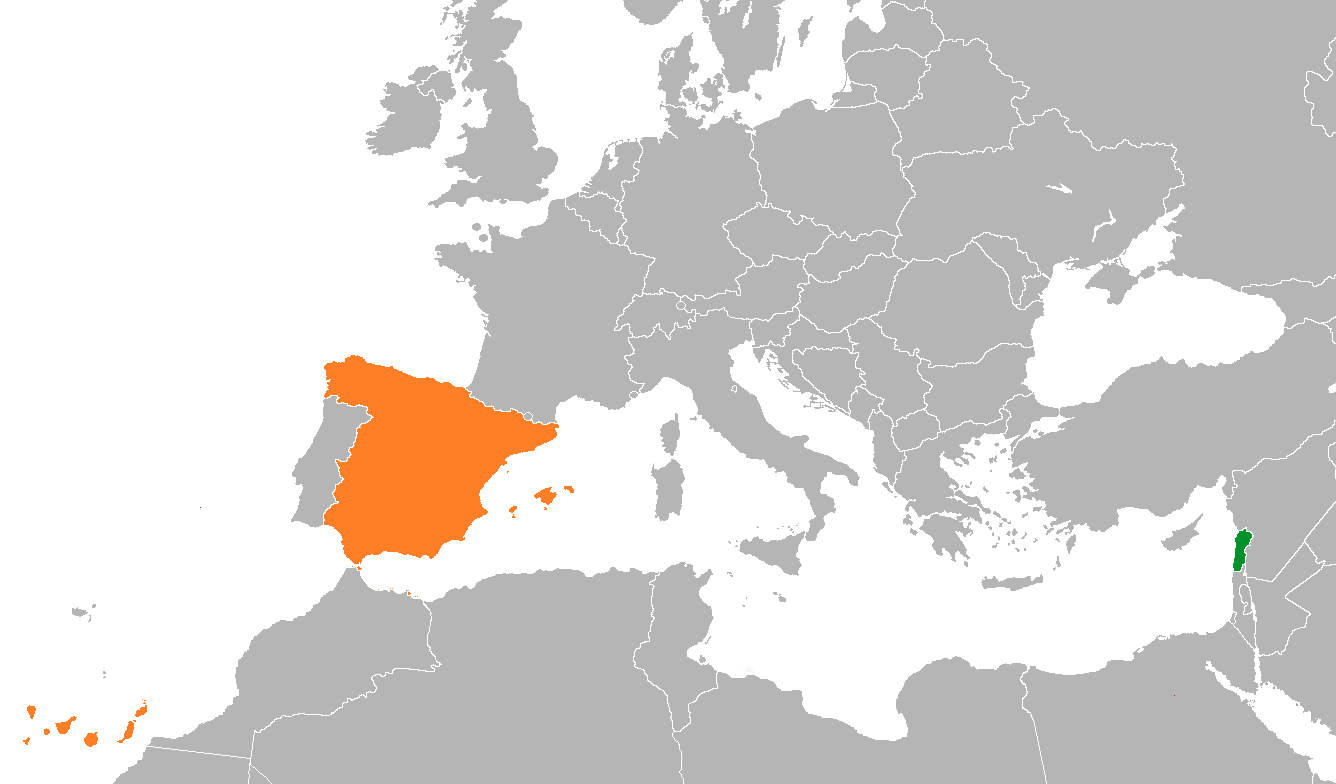
- Lebanon: Spain

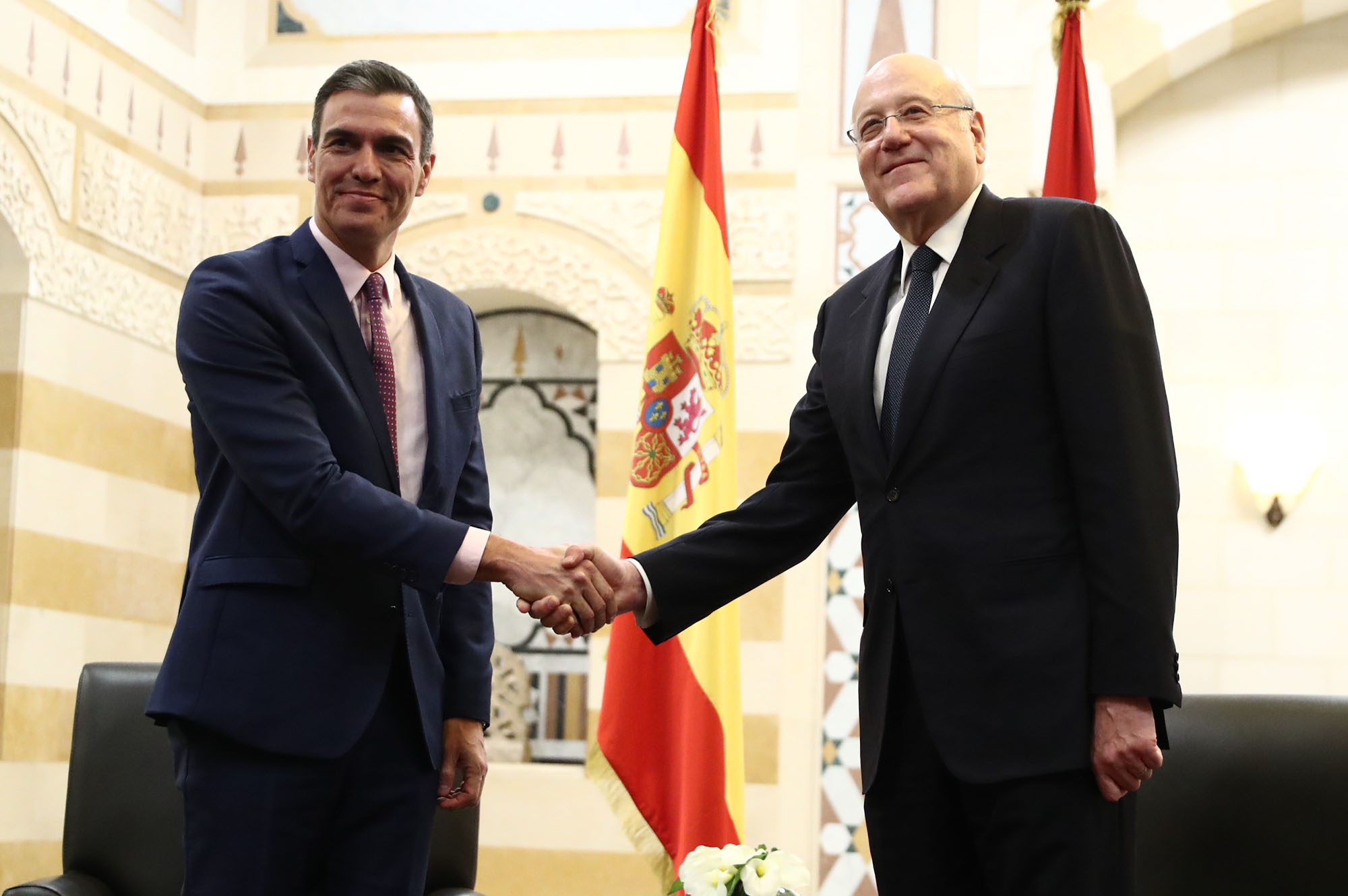
Lebanese Prime Minister Najib Mikati with Spanish Prime Minister Pedro Sánchez in 2022

Lebanon and Spain have maintained diplomatic relations since 1948. Lebanon has an embassy in Madrid, and Spain has an embassy in Beirut. Both countries are members of the Union for the Mediterranean.

== History ==
Formal relations between both countries date back to 1948 and were upgraded to embassy-level relations in 1953.

== Diplomatic relations ==
Bilateral relations have intensified greatly in recent years, especially since the decision of the Government of Spain to join the reinforced FINUL, after the war with Israel of July 2006.

The presence of a military contingent in FINUL reflects the Spanish commitment with Lebanon, in particular, and with the maintenance of peace in the region. The authorities and the Lebanese population appreciate the important Spanish participation in FINUL, especially after the sad event that ended the lives of six soldiers because of a terrorist attack in June 2007. The Spanish Division General Alberto Asarta Cuevas exercised the command of the FINUL Mission for two years, from 28 January 2010 until the end of January 2012. Good proof of the fluidity and the excellent level of relations has been the exchange of visits of special significance: the President of the Lebanese Republic, Michel Sleiman, made a state visit to Spain in October 2009, the first visit of a Lebanese President to Spain since 1957. Similarly, His Majesty King Juan Carlos made an official visit to Lebanon in 2010, being the first visit of a Spanish Head of State to this country.

King Felipe VI has visited Lebanon in April 2015 to visit the base in Marjayoun and meet with PM Salam and some members of his government. Together with the Spanish presence in FINUL, commercial relations, with enormous development potential and cultural and educational exchanges, through the promotion of the creation of Spanish departments in the Lebanese University Faculties of Languages.

== Economic relations ==
In 2014, bilateral trade amounted to €412 million, of which €384 million correspond to Spanish exports and €28 million to imports from Lebanon. These figures represented an overall increase of 11% over the previous year (increases of 12% in exports and 1.1% in imports), an average annual growth rate of 9.1% of Spanish exports in recent four years (2010–2014) and a trade deficit balance for Lebanon, which has traditionally been very high, with coverage rates of 1,507% in 2010, 827% in 2011, 1,185% in 2012. 1,245% in 2013 and 1,361% in 2014, favorable to Spain. In 2014, a total of 2,807 Spanish exporting companies and 251 importers carried out commercial operations with Lebanese partners.

== Cooperation ==
In the new Master Plan (2013–2016) and as a result of the work of geographic and sectoral concentration, Lebanon will no longer be a priority country and the actions that will be carried out in the country will be framed within regional programs, specifically the Maintaining Strength and Resilience for Local Governments (MASAR) program that aims to promote institutional, social and economic development policies that support democratic governance and social cohesion of the partner countries of North Africa and the Middle East, by strengthening their institutions and their civil society.

== Spain in UNIFIL ==
Spain, France and Italy provide half the forces of the UNIFIL deployment in Southern Lebanon tasked with upholding UN security council decision 1701 which tasked UNIFIL and the Lebanese army with keeping Iranian proxy Hezbollah north of the Litani river which subsequently violated by Hezbollah. In 2015, a Spanish soldier was killed during fighting between Israel and Hezbollah.

== Resident diplomatic missions ==
- Lebanon has an embassy in Madrid.
- Spain has an embassy in Beirut.
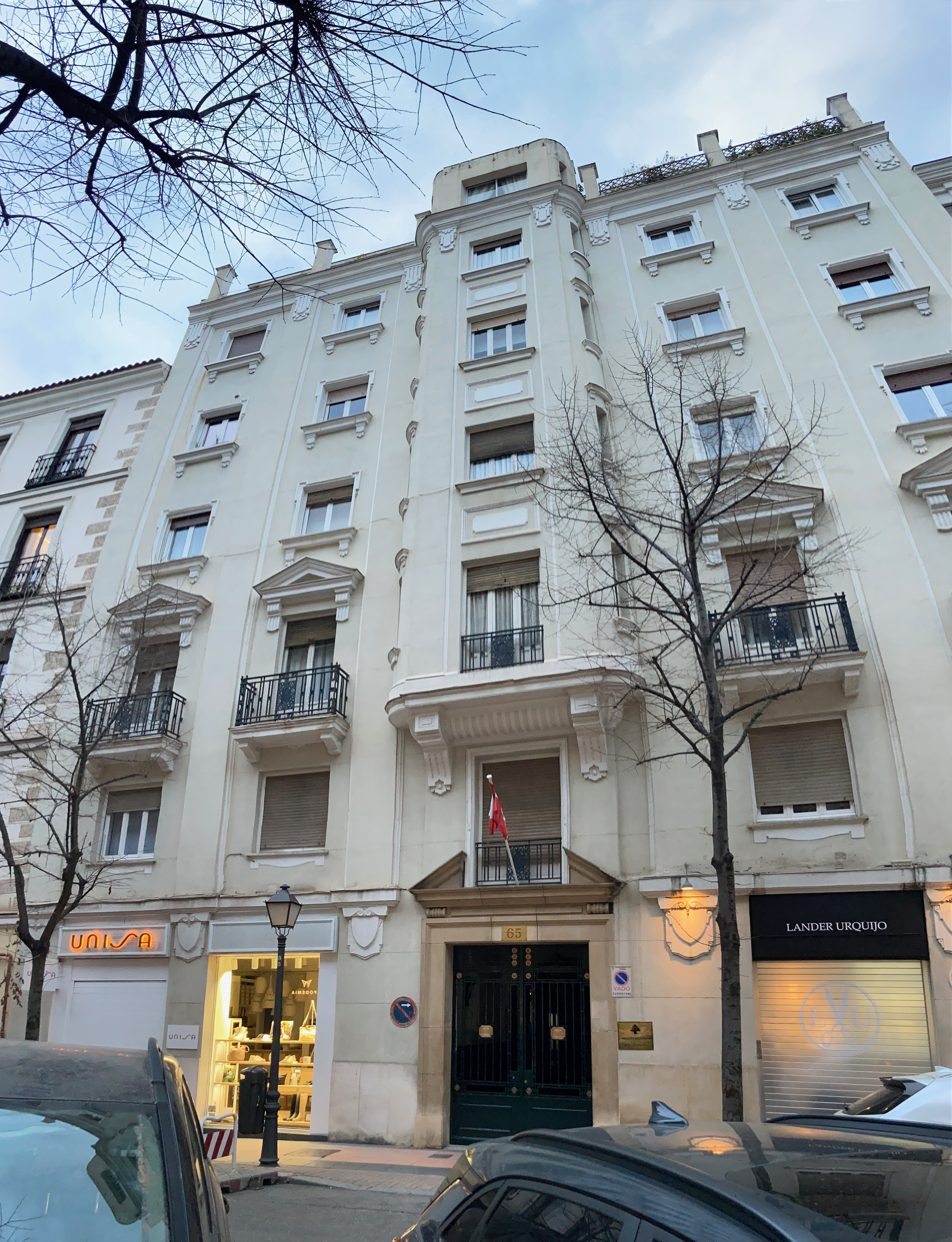
Embassy of Lebanon in Madrid

== See also ==
- Foreign relations of Lebanon
- Foreign relations of Spain
