= Lebanon–Romania relations =

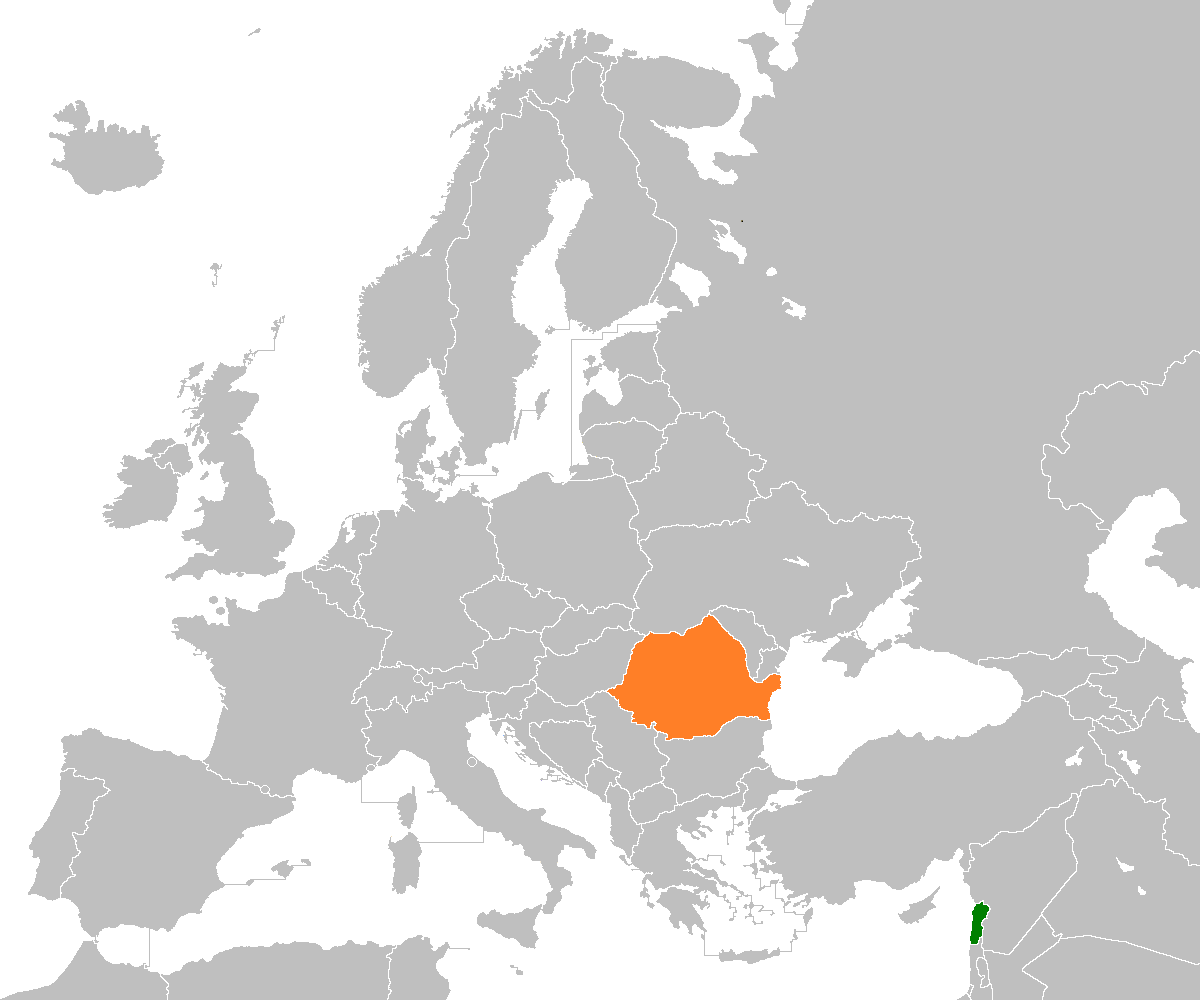
- Lebanon: Romania

Lebanon–Romania relations are the bilateral relations between Lebanon and Romania. Lebanon has an embassy in Bucharest and a consulate in Constanța, while Romania has an embassy in Beirut and a consulate in Tripoli. Both countries officially established diplomatic relations on 6 January 1965.

On 4 August 2020, there was an explosion in Beirut. The Romanian embassy was slightly damaged by the event. No Romanian citizens were affected. The Romanian president Klaus Iohannis sent his condolences to the victims and expressed solidarity with the Lebanese population. On 8 August, two aircraft of the Romanian Air Force arrived in Beirut. They carried around 8 tonnes of medical supplies donated to Lebanese hospitals. The Lebanese Air Force then brought the resources to their destinations. Romania was one of the countries to which the Lebanese Government asked for help.

== Resident diplomatic missions ==
- Lebanon has an embassy in Bucharest.
- Romania has an embassy in Beirut.

== See also ==
- Foreign relations of Lebanon
- Foreign relations of Romania
