= Cyprus–Lebanon relations =

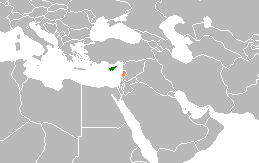
- Cyprus: Lebanon

Cyprus–Lebanon relations refer to the bilateral relations between Cyprus and Lebanon. Cyprus has an embassy in Beirut. Lebanon has an embassy in Nicosia. The relationship is significantly shaped by their geographic proximity and shared regional interests. Both countries are members of the Union for the Mediterranean.

In 2024, tensions in the security relations have risen due to a warning from Hezbollah's leader, Hassan Nasrallah, about a "war without rules" if Cyprus allows Israel to use its territory in any conflict against Hezbollah.

In 2025, Lebanon and Cyprus agreed to sign a long-delayed maritime border agreement.

== History ==
The ties between Cyprus and Lebanon date back to ancient times, influenced by various civilizations such as the Phoenicians, Greeks, Romans, Byzantines, and Ottomans. These connections have laid a strong foundation for contemporary relations. The Phoenicians, who arrived from the Levantine coast (including modern-day Lebanon), had established multiple settlements on the Island of Cyprus — including the city of Kition. These settlements were culturally Phoenician and were politically influenced by the then-Phoenician city of Tyre.

Diplomatic relations were formally established on 20 September 1960, after both countries gained independence—Lebanon from France in 1943 and Cyprus from Britain in 1960. Each country maintains an embassy in the other’s capital, fostering direct diplomatic engagement.

== Political relations ==
The political relationship between Cyprus and Lebanon is characterized by mutual support and cooperation on regional stability and conflict resolution. Recent meetings between leaders, such as Cypriot President Nikos Christodoulides and Lebanese Prime Minister Najib Mikati, emphasize the strong bilateral ties and the commitment to further enhance them.

On 10 January 2025, Christodoulides met with the newly elected Lebanese President Joseph Aoun in Beirut not only to congratulate Aoun but also to express his willingness to support the Lebanese people, government, and do all it takes to ensure the integrity and prosperity of the Lebanese people.

== Economic relations ==
Economic cooperation is a key aspect of Cyprus-Lebanon relations, with significant interactions in trade, investment, and tourism.

The two countries engage in the exchange of various goods. Cyprus exports pharmaceuticals, machinery, and foodstuffs to Lebanon, while importing machinery, electrical equipment, and agricultural products from Lebanon.

Tourism is a vital sector, with Lebanese tourists frequently visiting Cyprus, attracted by its close proximity and appealing destinations. Conversely, Cyprus serves as a significant destination for Lebanese seeking leisure and business opportunities.

== Cultural relations ==
Cultural exchanges highlight the shared Mediterranean heritage of Cyprus and Lebanon. Events such as music festivals, art exhibitions, and educational exchanges are common, fostering mutual cultural appreciation and understanding.

=== Education and academia ===
Universities and research institutions in both countries often collaborate on projects related to archaeology, history, and Mediterranean studies.

== Security and defense ==
Both nations cooperate on security and defense, addressing common challenges such as maritime security, counter-terrorism, and emergency response. Cyprus has provided military assistance to the Lebanese Armed Forces, reflecting the depth of their defense cooperation.

In June 2024, Hezbollah Secretary-General Hassan Nasrallah warned of a "war without rules" if Cyprus allows Israel to use its territory in any conflict against Hezbollah. This statement came amid escalating Israel–Hezbollah conflict, emphasizing Cyprus' strategic position in the region and its bilateral defense cooperation agreement with Israel. Cyprus has denied providing military assistance to Israel, stressing its neutrality. However, in response to the threat, Cyprus is updating its anti-terrorism measures. The European Union (EU) has also expressed support, stating that any threat against Cyprus is a threat against the entire EU. President Nikos Christodoulides of Cyprus told that his country was “not involved in the war conflicts in any way.”

== Regional cooperation ==
Cyprus and Lebanon participate actively in regional organizations and initiatives, including the Union for the Mediterranean. They have also been involved in tripartite cooperation mechanisms with Greece, aimed at promoting peace, security, and development in the Eastern Mediterranean.

=== Syrian refugee crisis ===
Both countries have worked closely on addressing the Syrian refugee crisis, with Cyprus providing support to Lebanon, which hosts over 1.5 million Syrian refugees. Additionally, Cyprus and Lebanon have agreed to advance maritime border talks following Lebanon’s maritime boundary agreement with Israel, which opens opportunities for offshore gas exploration.

== Resident diplomatic missions ==
- Cyprus has an embassy in Beirut.
- Lebanon has an embassy in Nicosia.

== See also ==
- Foreign relations of Cyprus
- Foreign relations of Lebanon
- Lebanese Cypriots
- Lebanon-Cyprus maritime border agreement
