= Iranian influence in Lebanon =

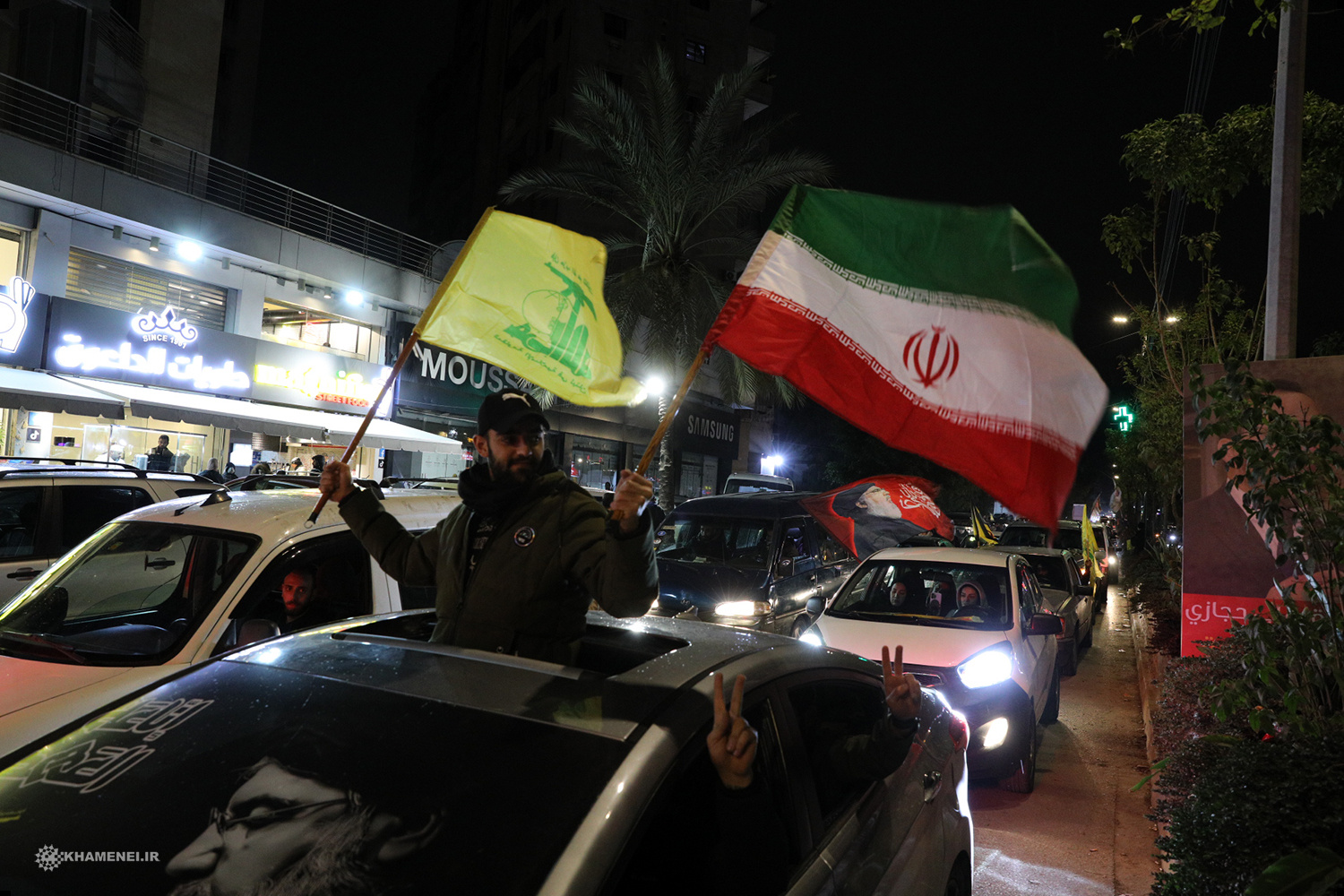
Lebanese Hezbollah supporter waving the flags of Hezbollah and Iran.

Iranian influence in Lebanon dates to the 16th century and has grown considerably during the 20th century, first minimally under the Shah through the interchange of elites, specifically in Beirut and then significantly following the Iranian Revolution and Iran's training and funding of Hezbollah. Iran has had a prominent influence in the social services, education, the economy and politics of Lebanon.

Critics have argued Lebanon provides Tehran access to the Mediterranean as well as regional influence through organizations such as Hezbollah, considered an Iranian proxy which conducts operations in nearby Syria in defense of the Bashar Al Assad regime, an Iranian ally.

== Overview ==
Iran has longstanding connections with Lebanon, particularly through its Shi'ite community, one of the largest among the country's 18 recognized sects. Many Lebanese clerics have ties to Iran, either originating from there, receiving training under Iranians, or maintaining strong Iranian connections. Musa al-Sadr, an Iranian-born cleric from a prominent Lebanese theological family, played a pivotal role in mobilizing Lebanon's Shiite community. In 1974, he founded the Movement of the Disinherited, which later formed the armed wing Amal during the Lebanese Civil War. While Sadr disappeared in 1978, Amal continues to be one of Lebanon's major Shiite parties.

Critics point to 1982 as a significant milestone in Iranian-Lebanese relations when Tehran facilitated the establishment of Hezbollah. Iranian operational and financial support played a crucial role in shaping Hezbollah into a powerful militia, serving as a significant deterrent against Israel. Hezbollah's symbolic and strategic successes against Israel elevated Iran's influence in Levantine politics and enhanced its appeal across the Arab world. Despite Hezbollah's political ascendance as the second major Shiite party, driven by its advocacy for Shiite rights, social services, and resistance against Israel, its ties to Iran have disrupted Lebanon's delicate political balance and heightened sectarian tensions. Iranian influence is said to have contributed to the rise of sectarianism in Lebanon, which according to critics has damaged the Lebanese economy.

== Pre-Iranian Revolution history ==
Relations between Iran and Lebanon have historical roots that precede the establishment of modern Lebanon. In the 16th century, the Safavid dynasty adopted Shiism as the official religion, deviating from the prevailing Sunni Islam in the region, enlisted Shiite clerics from Jabal Amel, a region in south Lebanon which already had a Shiite community established since the 11th century, to promote Shiism as a state religion, leading to the flourishing of clerical and family exchanges. The Lebanese maintained a distinct identity and developed stronger ties with Iraq than with Persian-speaking Iran. Additionally, Beirut's emergence as a significant Middle East commercial and cultural hub attracted Iranian elites, with two prime ministers under the last shah receiving their education there.

In the latter half of the 20th century, individuals opposing the Iranian monarchy sought refuge in Lebanon. Some actively participated in Lebanese politics and underwent training in Palestinian camps before and during the Lebanese civil war.

Under the Shah's rule, Iran's involvement in Lebanon primarily entailed funding for Shiite social institutions, with a strategic interest in countering radical ideologies and maintaining regional stability. However, by the late 1950s and throughout the 1960s, Iran's engagement intensified, particularly with the emergence of Musa al-Sadr and the shifting political mobilization of Lebanese Shi'ites. Al-Sadr's alliances with regional powers marked a significant turning point, signaling a deeper involvement by Iran in Lebanon beyond the initial minimal engagement under the Shah.

Musa al-Sadr, initially engaged with the Shah of Iran, accepting Iranian funding for Lebanese Shiite social institutions. However, their relationship soured in the 1970s, with al-Sadr becoming critical of the Iranian government. Dissenters from Iran arrived in Lebanon during this period, disseminating an anti-Shah message and receiving military training, primarily through the Palestine Liberation Organization (PLO).

== Hezbollah ==
Iran has equipped the Lebanese Shiite group, Hezbollah with advanced weaponry. Hezbollah has been described as an Iranian proxy. Iran is said to have effectively established a force aimed at deterring Israel and targeting Israeli assets in potential regional conflicts. Hezbollah's armament includes an arsenal of approximately 40,000 rockets and missiles, featuring mid-range options like Zelzal 1 and Zelzal 2 with a range of 95 to 130 miles, along with a variant of the Fateh 110 reaching up to 155 miles. Hezbollah is said to have 150,000 missiles.

Hezbollah has provided operatives and logistical support to Iran, according to critics this has allowed Iran plausible deniability in its involvement. Notably, Argentine prosecutors have accused Hezbollah and Iran of orchestrating the 1994 bombing of a Jewish community center in Buenos Aires. Hezbollah is also purported to have assisted Iraqi Shiite militias aligned with Iran, and at least one Hezbollah operative was apprehended by U.S. forces in Iraq. However, backing Hezbollah does not uniformly translate into unwavering allegiance or support for Iran among Lebanese Shiites.

Shiites acknowledge Iran's support in pressuring Israel's withdrawal, there exists a wide spectrum of opinions about Iran as a political model, with many harboring concerns about its long-term intentions. Hezbollah's influence is intricately tied to its domestic standing and regional image, both of which have suffered due to perceptions of being an Iranian proxy.

== Iranian influence in the economy ==
Iran has allocated millions of dollars for infrastructure development in Lebanon, including the construction of bridges, roads, schools, and hospitals. Over ninety schools in Lebanon have been built with Iranian financial support, primarily through the government-funded Reconstruction Crusade (Jihad-i Sazendagi). Numerous Iranian institutions, such as the Committee of Imam Khomeini and the Iranian Red Crescent, operate in Lebanon with resources sourced from the state budget or government-transferred properties.

The Iranian government also launched the Arabic TV station al-Aalam in the early 21st century, managed by Hezbollah members near the Iranian embassy in Beirut. Ayatollah Ali Khamenei, the supreme leader of the Islamic Republic and the second-highest religious authority (Marja taqlid) among Lebanese Shiites, has offices in the suburbs of Beirut and southern Lebanon. While these offices officially serve as religious headquarters, they are also used by the Iranian intelligence service and Hezbollah for information gathering, political and security meetings, surveillance, and even as military courts and detention facilities.

Lebanon is currently in economic and political crisis, marked by the failure to form a government. The deadlock is a result of the internal alignment between Lebanese President Michel Aoun and politician Gebran Bassil, who aim for complete control over the government. Regionally, Iran by itself or through Hezbollah has been accused of seeking to keep Lebanon hostage to leverage it in negotiations with the West.

Conditions in Lebanon have deteriorated in the 2010s and 2020s, characterized by internal unrest, protests, economic struggles, and a devalued currency. Maronite Patriarch Bechara Boutros Al-Rai delivered a politically charged sermon, urging the Lebanese people to reclaim the identity of Lebanon and emphasizing the role of the Lebanese Army as the legitimate force for defense.

The Patriarch's previous speech, likened to a historic call for Syria to withdraw from Lebanon in 2000, explicitly referred to Hezbollah and Iran. Dissatisfaction with Hezbollah and Iranian influence is evident in protests, with crowds expressing sentiments against Iran. Israel is fortifying its northern borders and cautioning Hezbollah against attacking, while Russia, during a Hezbollah delegation visit, reportedly conveyed a message from Israel warning of military escalations.

In September 2021, despite lacking representation in key leadership positions, Lebanese Hezbollah coordinated the importation of over one million gallons of Iranian diesel fuel into Lebanon. This shipment marked the initial delivery of a series totaling more than 13 million gallons, with an Iranian vessel unloading the fuel at the Syrian port of Banias for subsequent overland transport across the Syrian border into Lebanon. The Lebanese which grappled with the Lebanese 2021-Today economic crisis the truck convoy was greeted with celebration by Hezbollah members and many Lebanese citizens facing severe hardships. On September 24, Hezbollah announced the successful arrival of a second Iranian ship in Baniyas, emphasizing that its fuel cargo would also be destined for Lebanon.

In 2021, Saudi Arabia banned imports from Lebanon due to concerns over Iran.

== Iranian military equipment and activity in Lebanon ==
Hezbollah currently possesses a restricted capacity to engage airborne targets, relying on short-range antiaircraft guns, man-portable air defense systems (MANPADS) such as the Iranian Misagh (modeled after the Chinese QW-1). Khordad-15, an Iranian air defence system similar to the American patriot, which can engage up to six fighter-jet size targets from 120 km (75 miles).

Hezbollah, considered an Iranian proxy and part of the "Axis of Resistance" possesses Iranian-designed rockets, including Raad (Arabic for Thunder), Fajr (Dawn), and Zilzal (Earthquake), which surpass Katyushas in both payload capacity and range.

In September 2023, Israel alleged that Iran was constructing an airstrip in southern Lebanon with the potential for launching attacks. A source not affiliated with Israel, familiar with the location, indicated that the site could support large drones, possibly weaponized, modeled after an Iranian design.

Weapons and gear including advanced systems, GPS for missiles and more precise rockets were transported via flights to Beirut international Airport which is controlled by the Lebanese armed forces. These flights were conducted by the Iranian civilian airline Qeshm Air, known for its connections to the IRGC Quds forces. In recent months, reports emerged about a reform at Beirut International Airport in Lebanon and Iran. According to this reform, Iranian visitors no longer need to get their passports stamped upon entering Lebanon.

Critics, particularly Shi'ite Lebanese opponents of Hezbollah, have cautioned that this change allows the Islamic Revolutionary Guard Corps to increase their subversive activities in Syria and Lebanon. Critics argue it facilitates the transportation of Iranian forces and Shiite militia members to Syria via Beirut without leaving a record. Despite denials of any reform by Lebanese General Security, the Lebanese Ambassador to Iran clarified to the media that entry for Iranian visitors was now documented separately. He explained that the new measure aimed to promote Iranian tourism in Lebanon and assist Iranian civilians planning to visit the US later. Similar procedures were reportedly implemented for Palestinians with Palestinian Authority passports to address issues related to Israeli stamps.

During the Second Lebanon War in 2006, the Israeli air force targeted Beirut Airport due to Hezbollah's use of the facility for smuggling weapons from Iran. In 2008, the attempt by the March 14 alliance, which opposed Hezbollah, to remove Wafiq Shoukeir, the security chief at Beirut Airport, was one of the factors contributing to the violent riots in Lebanon. Shoukeir, aligned with Hezbollah, granted the organization significant freedom of action at the airport. In 2013, members of the March 14 alliance once again raised concerns, stating that the airport was "occupied by Hezbollah and Iran." Lebanese Member of Parliament Nadim Gemayel, affiliated with the Kataeb Party, which opposes Hezbollah, voiced complaints in August 2018, asserting that Lebanese authorities were relinquishing control of Beirut Airport to Hezbollah, abandoning their own authority.

According to Middle East Forum fellow Hussein Aboubakr Mansour, the strategic importance of Lebanon to Iran is likely to grow, which according to Mansour poses challenges for the survival of the Lebanese state. Russia is said to have also seen an opportunity to influence Lebanon and reduce U.S. presence in the region but faces complexities in outmaneuvering Iran according to Mansour. Mansour called for a more assertive U.S. stance against Iran and its proxies for meaningful assistance to the Lebanese people.

In October 2023, Iranian backed Hezbollah clashed with Christians opposed to Hezbollah near the Israeli border after Hezbollah sought to establish military infrastructure in the Christian village of Ain Ebel. Christians from another village in Southern Lebanon also complained of Hezbollah trying to create military infrastructure in the town.

In January 2024, as part of Israel's efforts to prevent the transfer of weapons from Iran to Hezbollah through Syria, Israel killed several officers in the Iranian Revolutionary Guards using missiles.

== Iranian influence in politics ==
Most Iranian government ministries maintain an office in Beirut, including the Ministries of Education, Welfare, Telecommunications, Intelligence, Health, and Culture and Islamic Guidance.

In the midst of a 2006 governmental crisis in Lebanon, Hezbollah leader Hassan Nasrallah urged his supporters to prepare for mass protests with the aim of overthrowing the Western-backed government led by Prime Minister Siniora. The crisis unfolded as five Hezbollah-aligned politicians resigned from Siniora's cabinet, following failed negotiations. These talks intended to grant Hezbollah increased influence over the government, including the power to veto decisions.

Additionally, the dispute extended to a UN-drafted plan investigating the assassination of former Lebanese Prime Minister Rafic Hariri, a murder widely suspected to have originated from Syria, a key supporter of Hezbollah. Hezbollah's objective appears to be the dissolution of the existing government, compelling new elections. While the current administration contends its constitutional capacity to operate without the Hezbollah-allied ministers, the potential weakening is notable, given that the Hezbollah axis, predominantly Shiite, represents Lebanon's largest single religious community.

The unfolding events were described as increasing Iranian influence in Lebanon. Following the 2006 crisis, concerns arouse regarding Lebanon potentially becoming an Iranian puppet state, given the growing electoral support for Hezbollah.

In 2017, a Lebanese military court handed down a death sentence to Sheikh Ahmed Assir, a prominent local Sunni jihadi leader. Assir had been incarcerated since 2015 for orchestrating clashes between his followers and the Lebanese Armed Forces (LAF) in Sidon two years prior, resulting in the deaths of 17 soldiers. While Assir's impending execution may not have evoked sympathy from most Lebanese, the announcement led to Sunni protests across the state. For some Sunnis, the treatment of Assir symbolized the growing, conspicuous dominance of the Shi'a militia Hezbollah backed by Shi'a Iran in Beirut.

In 2022, Sunni former prime minister Saad Hariri retired from Lebanese politics, citing Iranian influence as a reason for his lack of optimism regarding Lebanon's future.

In recent years, following economic crisis and lack of stability in Lebanon, Lebanese Christians have abandoned pro-Hezbollah political parties which led to the pro-Iran parliamentary political parties losing their majority in the Lebanese parliament.

Iranian influence in Lebanon has raised fears among Christians of an existential crisis according to Habib C. Malik, a researched in the Philos project. Malik wrote in the Christian Post that Iran and its proxies seek to remove Christians in non-violence from the Middle East as well as creating conditions which would encourage Christians in Lebanon to emigrate.

The leader of the opposition Kataib party, Samy Gemayel, said in an interview with the Saudi television channel AlHadath that the Lebanese state had surrendered to Hezbollah. Another Christian leader said militias were "considering a military escalation against Hezbollah".

In October 2023 MP Fadi Karam of the Lebanese Forces party on told Radio Free Lebanon: "The decision on war [in Lebanon] is currently in the hands of Iran. [The principle of] 'the unity of the fronts' means revoking the sovereignty and the independence of Iraq, Syria and Lebanon."

== Iranian influence in education, welfare and religion ==
The Iranian government sponsors numerous Lebanese students affiliated with Hezbollah in Iranian universities and seminaries, particularly in Qom. Qom's seminary has a dedicated school for foreign students, offering distinct educational programs that encompass both political and theological training for these individuals.

According to The Washington Institute for Near East Policy, Iran seeks to persuade Lebanese Shi'ites that the Islamic Republic not only supports their struggle against Israel but also addresses their essential needs. Hezbollah has benefited from Iran's generosity, establishing a reputation for stepping in when the central government falls short in meeting the people's welfare needs. The well-funded welfare initiatives for Lebanese Shiites, supported by a propaganda apparatus, is said to contribute to Hezbollah's widespread popularity among ordinary Lebanese Shiites and has consequently posed challenges for Shiite leaders outside the Hezbollah faction. Iran has funded 2,500 Lebanese Shiite clerics, paying them monthly salaries. Among Lebanese Shiite clerics, although a considerable amount advocated in favor of the Iranian Revolution, several have since changed their opinions, but have effectively been forced to keep criticism muted due to the influence of Hezbollah.

According to Michael Barak, a growing number of Shi'ites have joined protests against Hezbollah.
