= India–Lebanon relations =

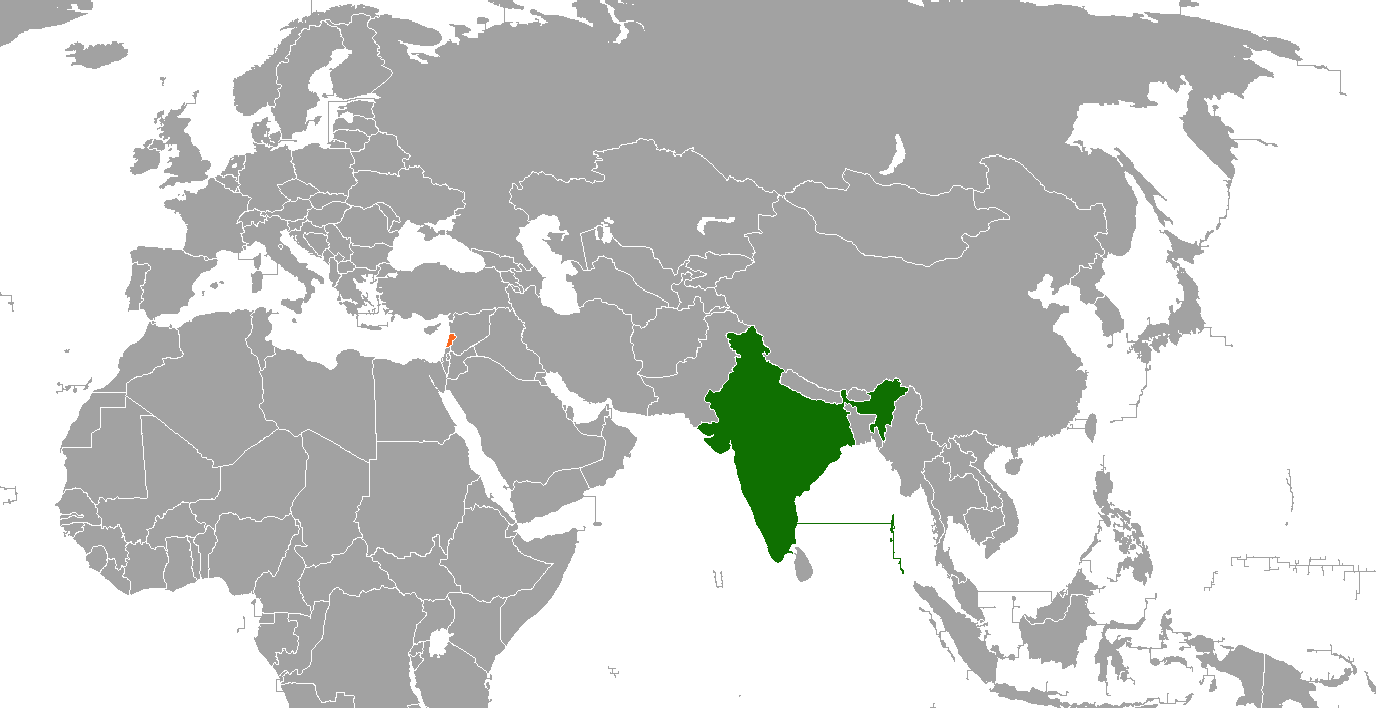
- India: Lebanon

Diplomatic mission
- Embassy of India, Beirut, Lebanon: Embassy of Lebanon, New Delhi, India

Envoy
- Indian Ambassador to Lebanon Shri Mohammad Noor Rahman: Lebanese Ambassador to India Mr. Rabie Narsh

The Lebanese Republic and the Republic of India established diplomatic relations in 1954. Lebanon maintains an embassy in New Delhi, while India maintains one in Beirut.

== Modern Relations ==
The fact that India kept its embassy in Beirut open and functioning throughout the Lebanese civil war from 1975 to 1990 (closing very briefly from 5 August to 16 October 1989), in contrast to the embassies of a large number of other countries, was greatly appreciated by Lebanon. Indian Battalion (INDBATT) have been deployed in the United Nations Interim Force in Lebanon (UNIFIL) since November 1998. INDBATT maintains 12 positions in its 107.6 km square AOR, which is divided into four parts. The UN troops complement but do not take over the tasks of Lebanon’s own army and police.

Both countries have co-operated closely on various issues of mutual interest during their overlap in 2010 as non-permanent members of the UN Security Council.

== Trade Relations ==
While the trade volume between the two countries has historically been relatively modest, there is recognition of the untapped opportunities that exist for deeper economic engagement. Both nations have expressed a desire to expand bilateral trade.

Total volume of trade between India and Lebanon during Jan-Sept 2017 was $181 million. Bilateral trade in 2016 reached $293.10 million, with Indian exports to Lebanon at $280.09 million, and Indian imports at $13.01 million.

During the fiscal year 2021–22, the bilateral trade volume between India and Lebanon reached a noteworthy $345.6 million. This trade dynamic was disproportionately favourable to India, consisting of Indian exports to Lebanon totaling $313.14 million, while Indian imports from Lebanon amounting to $32.46 million. A remarkable highlight was the significant surge in exports, showcasing a remarkable increase of over 64% from the preceding fiscal year, indicating the strengthening economic engagement between the two nations.

The main exports from India are electric batteries, chemicals, pearls, precious stones and metals, machinery, pharmaceuticals, textile articles, plastic, food items, etc., and imports from Lebanon are base metals and articles thereof, miscellaneous manufactured articles, etc.

During the last 26 years the exports of Lebanon to India have increased at an annualized rate of 18.5%, from $188k in 1995 to $15.5M in 2021 while the exports of India to Lebanon have increased at an annualized rate of 11.5%, from $17.2M in 1995 to $294M in 2021.

== Indian community in Lebanon ==
In 2006, the Indian population in Lebanon declined due to the 2006 Lebanon War.

One Indian national was killed in the Israeli attacks on Lebanon during the 2006 Lebanon War. After assessing the security situation in the area, the Indian authorities acted expeditiously and made immediate arrangements for the safe evacuation of Indian nationals from Lebanon. Evacuees including Sri Lankans and Nepalis were first brought by Indian naval ships from the Lebanese capital of Beirut to Larnaca in Cyprus and then flown to India, under an Indian military-coordinated exercise dubbed as "Operation Sukoon."

There are still 2000-2500 Indian nationals in Lebanon, with a majority of them employed as workers in the service sector, construction sector, and agriculture.
