= Timeline of the Syrian civil war (September–December 2011) =

The following is a timeline of the Syrian uprising from September to December 2011. This period saw the uprising take on many of the characteristics of a civil war, according to several outside observers, including the United Nations Commission on Human Rights, as armed elements became better organized and began carrying out successful attacks in retaliation for the ongoing crackdown by the Syrian government on demonstrators and defectors.

== September 2011 ==
=== 1 September ===
The attorney general of Hama resigned. According to the Syrian Observatory for Human Rights, Syrian Army elements laid siege to Douma, a Damascus suburb, and killed a man in the central city of Homs. It claimed 360 civilians and 113 security officers were killed during the Ramadan crackdown of the previous month. Syrian troops reportedly conducted house-to-house searches in Hama.

=== 3 September ===
Syrian army's fighter jets flew over Houla and Rastan. There were also reports that the Syrian army were deployed in Banyas and raided Tal Kalakh and regions of Deir az-Zour. Al-Arabiya also reported that several protests broke out in the country, adding that "thousands participated in the funeral of martyrs of Arbin, near Damascus."

=== 4 September ===
Syrian activists said at least 13 people have been killed by the Syrian army during protests. The reported deaths came as the head of the International Committee of the Red Cross (ICRC) was due to meet with senior Syrian officials in the capital, Damascus. Eight of the deaths occurred in the Idlib province in the country's northwestern area, the Local Co-ordination Committees (LCC) said.

State-run media claimed 5 soldiers, one army officer, and 3 civilians were killed when "terrorists" attacked a military bus in Mhardeh in the morning. The report said 3 of the "terrorists" were killed in a shootout, while one loyalist soldier and another gunman were injured.

=== 6 September ===
Activists stated that Syrian security forces had killed two people as armoured vehicles came through the streets. Two mechanics were killed at their workplace in the town of al-Restan near Homs, the Local Coordination Committee said. City residents were hiding in homes and offices to escape the gunfire, while armoured vehicles were "shooting toward anything moving", the LCC said, citing witnesses on the ground.

Ban Ki-moon, the United Nations secretary-general, made his strongest remarks yet on the crackdown under way against Syrian anti-government protesters. Ban Ki-moon condemned the violence, which he said was being committed by President Bashar al-Assad's government. Ban called on Assad to take "bold and decisive measures before it's too late". "It's already too late, in fact," Ban said in New Zealand, where he was attending a meeting of Pacific leaders. "If it takes more and more days, then more people will be killed.", he went on to say. Ban also stated that it was time for United Nation members to unite and take "coherent measures".

Aleppo also witnessed a major demonstration after the sudden death of prominent Aleppine scholar and government critic Ibrahim Salqini, though state-run media claimed he died of a heart attack. Tens of thousands of people attended his funeral march and chanted against the government, invoking revolutionary slogans such as "better death than humiliation", before security forces reportedly fired on them as they entered the city cemetery.

=== 7 September ===
Citing "circumstances beyond our control", the Syrian government abruptly canceled Arab League Secretary-General Naril Elaraby's scheduled visit to Damascus. Elaraby's office confirmed that the visit had been indefinitely postponed.

At least 34 people were reported dead by Syrian activists in a tank assault on Homs that also involved about 20 truckloads of soldiers armed with live ammunition. Two more were reportedly killed in Sarmin, while one was killed in Hama. State-run media claimed two Baath Party officials were abducted by "terrorists" near Al-Rastan. Activists and locals reported that heavy machine-gun fire was heard in the Bab Dreib and Bostan Diwan neighbourhoods of Homs in the evening after at least 2,000 protesters marched toward the area from the Bab Tadmor district. Activists claimed the city was facing an especially vigorous assault due to a recent spate of defections, with one activist saying about 40 soldiers in Homs defected after refusing to fire on protesters.

=== 8 September ===
Military vehicles rolled into the village of Ibleen just after dawn in pursuit of defected soldiers, between three and five of whom were killed in the raid, according to a resident. Another resident told international media that five children under the age of 10 were among roughly a dozen villagers detained by troops in Ibleen. SANA reported that six security officers were killed and three more wounded in the operation, which it characterised as a raid to target "armed terrorist groups" and seize stockpiles of weapons.

In Homs, the army reportedly pelted the city with a heavy artillery barrage. Activists said areas where soldiers had been known to have defected were being targeted. At least 23 people were killed, residents told international media.

The Syrian opposition plan new mass Friday demonstrations, this time under the banner of "Friday of International Protection", referring to their campaign to get UN observers to monitor violence inside Syria, as a way to pressure the Syrian government.

=== 9 September – "Friday of International Protection" ===
Syrians protested across the country, calling for international help to stop the crackdown. Large protests called "Friday for International Protection" were reported in cities including Qamishli in the northeast, Homs and Hama in the center of the country, and Deir ez-Zor in the east. "A 15-year-old boy was martyred when soldiers manning a checkpoint opened fire in the village of al-Rama, in Jabal al-Zawiyah," in the northwest, the Syrian Observatory for Human Rights said in a statement. The LCC said the boy was killed after he was injured with his brother by "random shooting" in the village. In Damascus, activists alleged 8 soldiers were executed after refusing to fire on unarmed demonstrators. At least 6 protesters were injured in Damascus, the LCC said.

The body of a defected soldier's 74-year-old brother, one of the people abducted by soldiers the previous morning in Ibleen, was returned to his family by the Syrian Army.

Altogether, 14 people were reported killed throughout Syria on 9 September.

=== 10 September ===
Syrian police and soldiers allegedly killed 24 protesters, including at least 12 in Homs alone, as Nabil Elaraby, the head of the Arab League, met with Bashar al-Assad, urging him to stop violence and move forward with reforms. After the meeting, Elaraby announced that "a deal has been agreed to for reforms". The Syrian opposition were angered at Elaraby's meeting with Assad, arguing that "a deal for reform" is meaningless at this stage.

=== 11 September ===
Troops surrounded several villages, including near the protest hubs of Deir ez-Zor and Deraa, and conducted house-to-house raids and arrests. Sawasiah, a Syrian human rights organisation, claimed that at least 113 civilians had been killed over the past seven days, including three who were apparently tortured to death in military prisons. Leaders of the Syrian opposition again met in Istanbul and were scheduled to speak with a Paris-based Syrian academic by phone to discuss the unification of anti-government factions into a more cohesive political force. Citing activists in Abu Kamal, the Syrian Observatory for Human Rights said a woman was killed at midday by a stray bullet fired by security forces conducting arrests in the eastern town. It also said its sources in Damascus had reported a teenager wounded by a bullet while attending a funeral that was attacked by security personnel the previous day died as a result of his injuries.

The body of Ghiyath Mattar, 26, was returned to his family in Daraya, a suburb of Damascus. Ghiyath played a key role in organizing antigovernment protests. A friend of Ghiyath who saw his upper body today said that there were bruises on the chest, and his face had traces of wounds. Security forces (most likely Air Force intelligence, according to friends and relatives) had detained Ghiyath on 6 September with another leading protest organizer in Daraya, Yahya Sharbaji.

=== 12 September ===
Three prominent Syrian clerics of the Alawite sect, which President Bashar al-Assad belongs, have denounced the violence committed by the Syrian government against protesters. "We declare our innocence from these atrocities carried out by Bashar al-Assad and his aides who belong to all religious sects", Mohib Nisafi, Yassin Hussein and Mussa Mansour said in a joint statement from Homs. The three clerics denied state-media reports that members of the Shiite Alawite sect are being subjected to acts of killing and kidnapping in Homs, and said "The daily reports of kidnappings, killings and harassment of members of the Alawite sect are all untrue. They are designed and spread to cause divisions among people united against the regime".

Meanwhile, at least 26 civilians were killed in the Syrian government's ongoing crackdown on protesters, the Local Coordination Committees of Syria said. Among the dead was a 12-year-old boy shot to death when Syrian security forces fired on a funeral procession, according to the London-based Syrian Observatory for Human Rights.. The funeral procession was for a protester killed on 11 September, the observatory said. In addition, 17 people were killed during operations by the military and security forces in Hama as authorities searched for wanted activists and demonstrators, the organization said.

=== 13 September ===
Protesters in Deraa and Homs burned the Russian flag in protest over Russia's threatened veto of a United Nations Security Council resolution condemning Assad.

=== 14 September ===
Syrian rights activists say security forces have opened fire in northwestern villages Wednesday in an ongoing effort to crush dissent as the government rejected an Arab League demand for an end to the crackdown. Rights activists said government troops fired heavy machine guns during raids on several villages in Idlib province near the Turkish border. They say security forces cut local communications, blocked roads and made arrests.

The US ambassador Robert Stephen Ford and representatives from France, Germany, Canada, Japan, the Netherlands, the UK and the EU in an unprecedented gesture of solidarity with Syria's protest movement took part in a vigil for a prominent human rights activist Ghiyath Mattar believed to have been killed under torture by security forces.

=== 15 September ===
A group of Syrian activists declared on Thursday a council representing a united front in opposition to al-Assad. About 140 figures, including exiled opponents and 70 dissidents inside Syria, were chosen as members of the new Syrian National Council, concluding a four-day meeting in the Turkish city of Istanbul. The council aims to help topple Assad within six months and form an interim government thereafter, Basma Kadmani, a Syrian exile living in France, announced.

Mass protests are planned for Friday, under the banner of Friday of "continuing until we bring down the regime"

=== 16 September – "Friday of Continuing Until We Bring Down the Regime" ===
The Syrian Revolution General Commission claimed at least 18 were killed when police and army forces fired on demonstrations in and around Deraa, Homs, and Hama, among other cities. The LCC said it could confirm 19 deaths. Protests were reportedly attended by thousands, with anti-Assad rallies also springing up in Damascus and its suburbs, Deir ez-Zor Governorate, and Latakia Governorate. Thousands of Syrian Kurds also demonstrated in the northeast, according to at least one activist. State-run media reported that one police officer was killed and four wounded when they were shot at in Busra al-Harir, a village in Deraa Governorate.

By the end of the day, the death toll had reached 45 protesters.

=== 17 September ===
Syrian opposition members called on President Bashar al-Assad Sunday to end his deadly six-month crackdown or face an escalation in peaceful protests, as security forces fired warning shots to disperse high school students calling for the regime's downfall. The weekend meeting drew more than 200 opposition figures, including leading writer Michel Kilo and Hassan Abdul-Azim, who heads the outlawed Arab Socialist Democratic Union party. It was also notable because it took place inside Syria, rather than in a neighboring country, as most others have. A statement released after the meeting called on Assad's regime to immediately end its "acts of repression," and it urged protesters to keep their movement peaceful and not be tempted to take up arms. The London-based Syrian Observatory for Human Rights said a boy succumbed to his wounds in the southern city of Sanamein two days after being shot be security forces.

=== 18 September ===
At least 4 people were killed across Syria on Sunday, the Local Coordination Committees reported, as violence between protesters and Syrian security forces continued unabated. The LCC, an opposition activist group that organizes and documents anti-government demonstrations, said that 2 people were killed in Idlib and one person each in Daraa and Homs. Among the dead was an 11-year-old child, who had been wounded in the head by gunfire, the LCC reported. In Daraa province, security forces arrested activists suspected of participating in protests, the group said.

=== 19 September ===
The General Organisation for the Syrian Revolution said 13 people were killed in Syria throughout the day, including children and defected soldiers, in places including Deraa, Hama, Homs, and Latakia governorates. Thirty were reportedly arrested in Sahl al-Hawla and 20 were injured. In al-Bayadha, defected soldiers staged a hit-and-run attack on three army tanks, but it was unclear whether they caused any significant damage. Schoolchildren in Deraa were truant, protesting and refusing to return to school until Assad left power. In Harasta, outside Damascus, army vehicles blocked the expressway to Aleppo for unknown reasons.

Iraq also announced that it has requested Bashar al-Assad to step down.

=== 20 September ===
The White House says U.S. President Barack Obama and Turkish Prime Minister Recep Tayyip Erdogan have agreed to "increase pressure" on the Syrian regime to end the violence against antigovernment protesters. The U.S. and Turkish leaders discussed Syria in a meeting on 20 September on the sidelines of the annual UN General Assembly in New York. UN officials have estimated that pro-Assad forces have killed some 2,700 people since the uprising against the regime started in March, including at least 100 children.

Speaking separately in New York, the foreign minister of Syria's neighbor Iraq said a change of regime in Syria appears inevitable. Tanks surrounded the town of al-Kiswa, opposition activists claimed.

=== 21 September ===
Prime Minister Erdogan of Turkey announced that Turkey has cut of all relations and contacts with Syria, and is considering joining in on the sanctions.

=== 22 September ===
The Syrian opposition announced its intention for another Friday of protests, this time under the banner Friday of Unification against the Regime.

=== 23 September – "Friday of Unification Against the Regime" ===
Protesters took to the street, with protests occurring in Hama, Homs, Damascus, Aleppo, and Daraa. 50,000 attended an anti-government march in Homs. 12 protesters across Syria were killed by security forces. Amnesty international announced the death and mutilation of an 18-year-old girl in the hands of the Syrian army. The girl's body was returned to her mother by the Syrian army, and the corpse had clear signs of torture, including skin ripped off and her arms cut off.

Turkey continued to attempt to alienate the Syrian government, and has announced that it will be enforcing an arms embargo on Syria, and confiscate any weapon deliveries to Syria by ship. The European Union also toughened sanctions against the Syrian government, while Switzerland established a ban on Syrian oil imports on Friday.

The Free Officers Movement consisting of defected officers from the Syrian Armed Forces joined the Free Syrian Army, with the latter becoming the main armed opposition group in Syria.

=== 25 September ===
Syria pressed on with a crackdown on anti-regiment dissent Sunday, dispatching troop reinforcements to the flashpoint province of Homs and security forces near Damascus, activists said. "Military reinforcements were sent to Rastan, deploying around the building housing military security, and others to Qusseir," a town on the border with Lebanon, they said. The Syrian army had strengthened its presence in Qusseir on Saturday and previous days after many civilians tried to flee the area to escape the violence. The deployments come a day after activists reported that security forces had killed 12 civilians in Qusseir, in the central province of Homs, and one more in Hama, further north. The Syrian Observatory for Human Rights which carried the toll said that the 12 civilians were killed in Qusseir during raids for people wanted by the authorities.

=== 28 September ===
Syrian security forces killed at least 76 people in the past five days as part of a crackdown on protests against President Bashar al-Assad's government, a human rights activist said. At least seven people were killed today in the central governorate of Homs, following the death of 15 protesters yesterday there and in Hama, the northern province of Idlib and in the southern area of Daraa, where the uprising against Assad began in March, Mahmoud Merhi, head of the Arab Organization for Human Rights, said by phone today. State media said "terrorists" killed General Nael al-Dakhil, deputy chief of the chemistry faculty at Al-Baath University in Homs, and Mohammad Ali Akeel, deputy dean of its architecture faculty. Activists said security forces murdered them after they expressed opposition to the crackdown. Homs is a focal point of the uprising against Assad's government and the hometown of his wife, Asma.

=== 29 September ===
The Free Syrian Army claimed to have destroyed 17 loyalist tanks in the town of Rastan, and there were reports of more defections occurring with the ranks of the Syrian Army, raising fears that civil war could break out. At least 38 loyalist soldiers were injured in Rastan, some critically. The Harmoush battalion also reported that it killed 80 loyalist soldiers in fighting.

About 100 "pro-Assad" protesters attempted to attack the U.S. ambassador's convoy, but Ambassador Ford and his convoy remained unharmed in the incident. Security forces killed 17 protesters throughout Syria, and the opposition prepared for a new Friday of Protests, under the Banner of Friday of Victory for the Levant and Yemen.

=== 30 September – "Friday of Victory for the Levant and Yemen" ===
Syrian security forces have clashed with protesters, killing at least 30 people as tens of thousands have rallied across the country calling for President Bashar al-Assad to step down, activists say. There were reports that the security forces opened fire on protesters at several of the demonstrations on Friday, and that there were also clashes between troops who have joined the protesters and those loyal to Assad. Protests were reported in suburbs of Damascus, the capital, as well as in the southern province of Deraa, the northwestern province of Idlib, in Hama, Homs and several other cities.

An opposition activist, speaking to Al Jazeera on condition of anonymity, described the scene at one protest in Damascus:

The area where I stay now, a protest went around and it was soon attacked by security forces, and the attack included batons, hitting with batons, some gas bombs and later live ammunition that was shot all around. At least one person was injured. Later, after that, we could see a number of soldiers – we could see a clash between the soldiers and the security forces. And my friends confirmed that eight soldiers at least defected and shot back on the security forces.

== October 2011 ==
=== 2 October ===
Chairman Burhan Ghalioun of the Syrian National Council announced that an agreement had been reached in the aims and structure of the SNC. This followed two days of talks in Turkey. Bassma Kodmani, the appointed spokesperson for the SNC, stated that a general assembly of 190 members will be convened in November, along with a 29-strong general secretariat representing seven Syrian opposition factions. Among the constituent members groups of the SNC are the Muslim Brotherhood, the signatories of the 2005 Damascus Declaration and members of the Higher Syrian Revolutionary Council. The news was reportedly welcomed with a rally in Jisr ash-Shugur, according to pro-opposition Shams News Network.

Meanwhile, the government in Damascus announced its retaking of Rastan, while members of the Free Syrian Army announced their retreat from the town. Anti-Assad activists told the BBC that 250 tanks had been sent into the town by the Assad government, and that 50 of those vehicles had left on 2 October.

Saria Hassoun, son of Syria's Grand Mufti Sheikh Ahmad Badreddin Hassoun, was reportedly shot dead near Ibla University on the road between Idleb and Aleppo. Also killed in the ambush was a professor of History at Aleppo University, Dr. Mohammad al-Omar; both were taken to Idleb National Hospital, where they were pronounced dead. SANA blamed the deaths on "armed terrorist groups"; Al-Arabiya linked the incident to a spate of killings by armed dissidents of suspected Assad regime informers, most of whom were academicians, and that Syria was veering toward civil war.

French first lady Carla Bruni-Sarkozy called for the release of Syria's first female practicing psychoanalyst Rafah Nashed, who was arrested en route to Paris in September. Meanwhile, Venezuelan President Hugo Chávez reiterated his support for both deposed Libyan strongman Muammar Gaddafi and Assad, calling them "brothers" and backing Assad against "an aggression from Yankee imperialists and their European allies".

Rallies were reported in Hirak, Jabal az-Zawiya, Talmans, Jarjanaz, Maarat Horma, Kafr Takhareem, Bansh, Sermeen, Saraqeb, Hass, Jassem, Teebat al-Imam, Houran, Taseel, and Dael. Security forces reportedly killed six civilians.

=== 4 October ===
At the UN Security Council in New York, China and Russia vetoed sanctions against Syria. Hours later, Turkey threatened unilateral sanctions, and announced war games along the border.

=== 5 October ===
Activists say Syrian troops have stormed villages close to the border with Turkey in pursuit of army defectors, and that at least three people and four soldiers died in clashes there. Military operations were centered around the Jabal al-Zawiya region where defectors from the Syrian military are known to be active.

In Damascus, residents sabotaged the main square's fountain, making the water turn red to symbolize "the blood of martyrs", referring to slain protesters.

Two Syrian Army tanks entered the Bekaa border town of Arsal on the Lebanese side of the border, and fired at an abandoned battery factory, suspecting that armed men were hiding inside.

=== 6 October ===
The Syrian Army invades Lebanon for the second time in two days and shoots up several farmhouses, killing one person, before retreating back across the border.

Protesters plan to launch new Friday demonstrations, this time under the banner of Friday of the Syrian National Council as our Representative.

According to Syrian State news, a retired Brigadier General was captured and assassinated by "armed terrorists".

=== 7 October – "Friday of the Syrian National Council as our Representative" ===
At least 21 people were killed by security forces amid protests by tens of thousands to support the SNC, according to activists. The deaths occurred in Homs, Latakia, the Douma section of Damascus, and Zabadani. Protests were largest in Daraa, Deir Ezzor, Qamishli, Homs, and suburban Damascus.

Syrian Kurdish activist Mashaal Tammo was assassinated in his flat by masked gunmen, an attack blamed on Syrian security forces by anti-government activists. Tens of thousands of Kurds took to the streets in Qamishli after Tammo's death and gathered outside the hospital where his body was taken. Russian President Dmitry Medvedev says Syria's leaders should step down if they cannot enact reforms, but warns the West not to try to push Assad from power.

=== 8 October ===
More than 50,000 mourners marched through the streets of Qamishli, a city in the Kurdish north-east, to mark Tammo's funeral. At least 14 people were killed after security forces opened fire on the mourners.

=== 9 October ===
Eight loyalist soldiers were ambushed and killed by the Free Syrian Army in attacks on three army posts in Idlib Governorate. Syrian Foreign Minister Walid al-Moualem warned foreign governments not to recognise the Syrian National Council, saying, "We will take tough measures against any state which recognizes this illegitimate council."

=== 10 October ===
The Syrian Observatory for Human Rights said 17 soldiers and at least 14 civilians were killed, most of them in Homs, where loyalists clashed with defectors. Security forces arrested 27 people, it reported. The European Union issued a statement hailing the SNC, but made no move to recognise the council as the legitimate representative of Syria as it did the National Transitional Council in Libya.

=== 11 October ===
Tens of thousands of Syrians rallied in Damascus in a show of support for Assad, though the opposition alleged the pro-regime rally was staged and did not reflect popular opinion.

=== 12 October ===
In the southern village of Harra, at least six loyalist soldiers and two defected soldiers were killed after an ambush against loyalists in the town square. The northwestern town of Bannish was also the scene of clashes between loyalist and rebel army units; and the military flew 13 aircraft over the city of Aleppo, for unknown reasons.

=== 13 October ===
At least 20 people have been killed in renewed clashes across Syria, as the European Union decided on a new set of sanctions on President Bashar al-Assad's government. The UK-based Syrian Observatory for Human Rights said on Thursday that 10 civilians were killed in the town of Banash in the northern province of Idlib when soldiers loyal to President Bashar al-Assad stormed the town of Binish and fought battles with gunmen and army deserters. "The Syrian army backed by tanks and armoured troop carriers launched an assault this morning on the town of Banash and clashes took place with armed men who were apparently dissidents," the rights group said. The group said that the army also launched an attack on Taum village, in the province's east. "Several houses were partly destroyed and people were wounded... while the noise of heavy machineguns and explosions could be heard in several parts of the town and ambulances seen racing through the streets." In the southern province of Deraa, where the six-month wave of protests against Assad first erupted, the group said that six soldiers and two army deserters were killed in a clash in the town of Haara, alongside one civilian. Another soldier was killed in the central city of Homs.

=== 14 October – "Friday of the Free Army" ===
Syrian security forces shot dead at least six protesters on Friday during large anti-government demonstrations emboldened by growing international pressure on President Bashar al-Assad, activists said. The shootings occurred in Aleppo, Syria's second city, and in the suburbs of the capital Damascus, they said. Separately, at least 20,000 Kurds marched in the city of Qamishli near Turkey in honor of Mashaal Tammo, a Kurdish leader who was killed earlier this month, activists said. Tammo's supporters say the authorities were behind that killing, which has fueled outrage on the streets after seven months of political upheaval in Syria. Several thousand people also marched in the town of Hirak in the southern Hauran Plain, which was the first region to be stormed by tanks and troops at the beginning of the uprising in an effort to put it down. In the central city of Homs, video footage showed thousands of people rallying in the al-Khalidya neighborhood.

The number of people killed in Syria in violence related to protests against President Bashar al-Assad's government has now reached more than 3,000, the United Nations human rights chief has said, as she has called for "the international community to take immediate measures to protect the Syrian people".

=== 15 October ===
Syrian forces shot dead two mourners when they fired at a funeral in central Damascus for a 10-year-old child killed during a protest a day earlier, a witness said. Some mourners began throwing stones at the security forces, who fired live ammunition back, the witness told Reuters news agency by phone from the scene in the Maidan district on Saturday. "Passions were running high. The body was wrapped in white and thousands behind it were chanting 'the people want the execution of the president' and 'we will be free despite you Bashar'," the witness said. The child, Ibrahim Sheiban, was killed in a protest in the Qadam suburb of Damascus. His funeral took place in Maidan, an old, socially conservative district of the capital, because his family is originally from there, the witness, a private sector employee who did not want to be further identified, said. Monzer Makhous of the Syrian National Council, a coalition of opposition groups, told Al Jazeera that the Maidan area is known for its opposition against Assad's government. "That's why the security forces have shown such a large presence in this neighbourhood.

=== 17 October ===
Syrian troops killed 21 people during search operations in the flashpoint central city of Homs on Monday, a human rights group said. "Twenty-one people, some civilians and others police officers, were killed in Homs on Monday during operations by the army and the security services in several neighbourhoods of the city," the Syrian Observatory for Human Rights said. Troops shot dead two other civilians, one in Idlib province in the northwest and the other a 13-year-old boy in Hama, a protest centre north of Homs, the Britain-based watchdog said. Seven soldiers were also killed in clashes with gunmen suspected of being army defectors in Homs province, the Observatory reported earlier. It added that 20 soldiers fled into nearby orchards after those exchanges.

=== 18 October ===
The LCC said 25 doctors and pharmacists had been detained in recent weeks because they had provided medical treatment to protesters injured at demonstrations. The security forces require hospitals to report on those who seek treatment for gunshot wounds, prompting many civilians injured at protests to resort to makeshift clinics erected in private homes where facilities are minimal. The human rights advocacy group Avaaz said it had identified 57 patients who had been detained by the security forces from their beds in hospitals in the towns of Homs and Lattakia as a result of the reporting requirement. In addition, it said, the government-sponsored militias known as Shabiha have used Red Crescent ambulances to shoot at demonstrators.

=== 20 October ===
There were more clashes between army loyalists and defectors across Syria. The clashes apparently occurred in the town on Burhaniya near Homs leading to at least five civilian deaths as well as the death of several loyalist soldiers and the destruction of 2 military vehicles. The opposition also plans another round of Friday protests, this time under the banner of Friday of the Matyrs of the Arab deadline, referring to the deaths of protesters since the Arab league declared a "two-week deadline" for reforms.

=== 21 October – "Friday of the Martyrs of the Arab Deadline" ===
Deaths have been reported during the latest protests in Syria, including up to 16 in the flashpoint central city of Homs, according to activist groups. Two people were shot dead on Friday in Homs by security forces manning a checkpoint, while 14 more were killed by security forces as they participated in mass protests, many celebrating the death of former Libyan leader Muammar Gaddafi, the opposition Local Co-ordination Committees said. Another civilian died when security forces opened fire on a funeral procession in the southern Deraa region, one of the focal points of opposition to Syrian President Bashar al-Assad's government and two more people died in the central province of Hama, according to the UK-based Syrian Observatory for Human Rights.

Activists and residents said Syrian authorities have stepped up security in several cities and towns including the Damascus suburbs and Talbiseh near Homs. "(There is an) unprecedented presence of security today with snipers on rooftops and roadblocks inside the suburb", an activist in Damascus suburb of Saqba said. Demonstrations also broke out in the ethnically Kurdish regions of Qamishli, Derbaseyeh, Malikiya and Amouda. In the town of Houla northwest of Homs, a crowd of several thousands held shoulders and waved old Syrian flags dating to before Assad's Baath party took power in a coup 48 years ago. "Doctor (Assad), you are next!" read banners carried by the villagers, according to live video footage. Demonstrations also flared in Homs, the provincial capital 140 km (85 miles) north of Damascus, where three members of one family were also shot dead at an army roadblock in Bab Sbaa district on their way to prayers, local activists said.

=== 23 October ===
Syria's military clampdown on protest hubs, and skirmishes pitting soldiers against gunmen, believed to be defectors, killed at least 11 people on Saturday, activists said. Meanwhile, Iran, Syria's key ally, took a tougher stance against the regime of President Bashar al-Assad, openly condemning its crackdown on dissent that has left more than 3,000 people dead, most of them civilians, according to the United Nations. Iranian President Mahmoud Ahmadinejad condemned the "killings and massacre" in Syria in an interview with CNN, in the Islamic republic's strongest criticism of its neighbor's deadly repression of protests calling for greater freedom and the fall of the Assad regime.

=== 25 October ===
Clashes occurred in the northwestern town of Maarat al-Numaan on 25 October between loyalists and defected soldiers at a roadblock on the edge of the town. The defectors launched an assault on the government-held roadblock in retaliation against a raid on their positions the previous night. At least seven Syrian security agents, including an officer, and possibly as many as 10 were killed in the ambush, according to the Syrian Observatory for Human Rights.

=== 26 October ===
The Syrian Observatory for Human Rights in London said 19 people were killed in Syria, including seven civilians shot by security forces in the Homs Governorate as well as nine loyalist soldiers killed in a rocket attack attributed to defectors. An Arab League delegation led by Secretary-General Nabil al-Arabi arrived in Damascus for talks.

=== 27 October ===
There were protests in Damascus in support of the Syrian National Council whilst some analysts began describing the situation as the beginning of a "sectarian war".

=== 28 October – "Friday of No-Fly Zone" ===
36 people were reported killed in Syria, most of them in Hama, whilst thousands of protesters marched demanding a no-fly zone be implemented, such as the one in Libya. Over 100 people were wounded and 500 arrested. Despite the threat of violence, around 170 protests took place on Friday, the traditional day of protest. State media claimed that armed gangs assaulted the main police station in Homs, which activists attributed to defectors from the army. A Lebanese official claimed that Syrian soldiers were laying landmines along the border between Syria and Lebanon near illegal border crossings. A former consultant to Bashar al-Assad claimed that if the crackdown on protestors continued, that Syria would soon slide into a civil war. There were reports of 17 pro Assad soldiers being killed in clashes with the Free Syrian Army in Homs.

=== 29 October ===
Tanks and artillery blasted the Homs neighbourhood of Baba Amr, the site of a 90-man defection from the Syrian security forces two days before, causing several casualties. The Syrian Observatory for Human Rights claimed that 20 soldiers died and 53 were injured in clashes between loyalist troops and "presumed deserters" in Baba Amr as well.

== November 2011 ==
=== 2 November ===
Syrian security forces shot dead at least 11 villagers they had stopped at a roadblock northwest of the central city of Homs, local activists said on Wednesday, while President Bashar al-Assad approved an Arab League plan to end the crackdown.

=== 3 November ===
At least 19 people have reportedly been killed in the flashpoint city of Homs, as Syrian security forces bombarded residential areas with tanks. This comes a day after the government approved an Arab League plan to completely halt its violent crackdown.

=== 4 November – "Friday of God is Greatest" ===
At least 20 people have been reported killed by Syrian security forces as massive anti-government demonstrations took place across the country following Friday prayers. Four civilians were reported to have been killed after security forces opened fire on protesters in the district of Kanakir in the capital, Damascus. Two protesters were reported killed in Hama, and one in the city of Hamouriya, not far from Damascus. Two others were reported killed trying to cross the border and flee into Jordan, according to reports. Six reported deaths in the Baba Amr area of Homs on Friday came a day after 22 civilians were reportedly killed there in a military crackdown. "Syrian security forces continue to shell and launch attacks on Bab Amr district," said Al Jazeera's Nisreen El-Shamayleh, reporting from Jordan. "At least 10 people were injured, but ambulances were prevented from entering the area to reach the wounded. And we are hearing reports that planes are still hovering over the district," El-Shamayleh said. In the port city of Latakia, an activist said he counted 13 security trucks surrounding the main Arsalan mosque. He said at least three protesters were wounded by security forces firing in front of the Bazar mosque in the centre of the city. "They were hit and taken by the security forces. In front of every mosque in Latakia there are several hundred security personnel carrying either batons, handguns, or automatic rifles," the activist said.

A total of 126 unidentified bodies were taken during the past three days to Al-Watani Hospital in Homs, Syria, a doctor there told CNN. The trauma physician did not want to be identified out of fear of retribution by government forces, who were at the hospital. Eight of the bodies were burnt, he said Saturday, adding that the deaths have not been reported in the state-run news media.

=== 7 November ===
Syria's opposition has appealed for international intervention in the central city of Homs, one of the focal points of the country's uprising, calling it a "humanitarian disaster area". The appeal, issued by the Turkey-based Syrian National Council, came as activists reported that at least 11 people were killed across the country on Monday, including two children, in an ongoing crackdown on anti-government protesters by security forces. Activists said that at least eight of the dead were in Homs where hundreds of residents protested against the rule of Syrian President Bashar al-Assad, adding that government troops stormed several areas and made house-to-house arrests. Heavy artillery clashes erupted between regime forces and presumed army defectors in Homs, activists reported, saying it was the fifth day of a "brutal siege on the brave city". More than 110 people have been killed in the past week in Homs according to the Local Co-ordination Committees activist network.

=== 8 November ===
In Hama, around 50 km north of Homs, tanks and armoured vehicles could be seen moving towards the city centre as snipers and armed government supporters surrounded a medical complex and the headquarters of the ruling Baath Party, the LCC said. The activist network reported that five people were killed in Hama. Explosions and heavy gunfire could be heard in the city, and electricity and internet services had been disabled, they said.

=== 10 November ===
Syrian security forces raided homes and clashes erupted between soldiers and army defectors Thursday, killing at least 21 people across the country, including an 8-year-old girl and six soldiers, activists from the Syrian Observatory for Human Rights said. In some of the attacks, security forces opened fire as they conducted raids in search of dissidents in areas including the suburbs of the capital, Damascus, Deir ez-Zor, Hama, Daraa, and Homs.

=== 11 November – "Friday of Freezing Syria's Arab League Membership" ===
As least 30 civilians were killed by the Syrian security forces and army troops, according to Syrian activists. Most of the victims were reported in the restive city of Homs as Human Rights Watch renewed accusations of the regime's crimes against humanity. The deaths came amid mass anti-regime rallies demanding the Arab League suspend Syria's membership in the pan-Arab body to sanction its brutal, eight-month crackdown on dissent. Security forces broke up demonstrations in al-Malaab, a main thoroughfare in Homs, but rallies relocated and mushroomed, engulfing eight neighborhoods, including Al-Bayada, al-Ghuta and Baba Amr, the Syrian Observatory for Human Rights said in a statement from Nicosia, according to AFP. In the northwestern province of Idlib, near Turkey, demonstrations erupted after the weekly Muslim midday prayers. The Observatory also reported mass protests in Idlib's Sheikhun in the wake of a "retreat by security forces from government buildings following violent clashes" and that "security forces unleashed heavy gunfire to disperse demonstrations", in the eastern oil hub of Deir al-Zor. In Damascus, security forces deployed on the streets of Barzeh and posted snipers on rooftops, after a wave of arrests and deadly violence shook the capital's neighborhood. In the town of Busret al-Sham, in Deraa province, cradle of the revolt, "security forces shot dead one person", the Observatory said.

=== 12 November ===
The Arab League announced it would suspend Syria effective 16 November over the violent crackdown and promised new sanctions, while also urging member states to withdraw ambassadors from Damascus. The Saudi Arabian and Qatari embassies were attacked by crowds in Damascus. Turkish and French consulates in Latakia were also attacked by crowds.

=== 13 November ===
Hundreds of thousands of supporters of the Assad regime protested against the Arab League decision. Protests against the Arab Leagues decision occurred in Damascus, Tartus, and Latakia. Meanwhile, Syrian security forces on Sunday pressed a crackdown on dissent, killing five people in the central cities of Homs and Hama, rights activists said, adding two loyalist soldiers were killed in an ambush. "Security forces opened fire killing four people in Hama," the Syrian Observatory for Human Rights said in an email received in Nicosia. In the central city of Homs, government snipers killed one person on Cairo Street in the early morning, said the Observatory, which reported a similar incident in the same place the previous day. Meanwhile, engineering students were injured by a "round of mortar" fire which hit their faculty building in Baath University, also in Homs, the same source added. Two civilians, one in Homs and the other in Hama, died from gunshot wounds suffered the previous day. Suspected army defectors ambushed and killed 2 loyalist soldiers patrolling town of Qusayr, near Homs, the Observatory said. By the end of the day, Syrian security forces had killed 26 people throughout Syria.

=== 14 November ===
At least 16 people were killed in clashes in and around Deraa, while three were killed in Homs and one was killed and 11 wounded in Saramein. Activists said the army killed 20 people in an attack on Khirbet Ghazaleh near the Jordanian border, including both civilians and armed fighters. The European Union agreed to expand sanctions against regime officials, while Russian Foreign Minister Sergei Lavrov said he believed the Arab League's suspension was a ploy by Western states to destabilise Syria. Troops backed by armor killed 20 people, army defectors, insurgents and civilians, in an assault on Khirbet Ghazaleh in the Hauran Plain, and in fighting that ensued near the town. A similar number of troops were killed.

=== 15 November ===
The death toll rose to 70 people as fighting continued into 15 November, activists reported. The UK-based Syrian Observatory for Human Rights said on Tuesday that 27 civilians were shot dead by security forces and 34 soldiers as well as 12 suspected army deserters were killed in clashes. Most of the victims were killed in the southern flashpoint province of Deraa, the observatory said in a statement. "Twenty-three people were shot dead by security forces posted along the road between the towns of Kherbet Ghazale and Hirak," the statement said. At least four other civilians were killed by security force fire in the city of Homs, a protest hub in central Syria, the rights group reported. The Jordanian embassy in Damascus was attacked by Assad loyalists after King Abdullah II criticized the violence and called for Bashar al-Assad to stepdown. The Syrian National Council calls for UN peacekeepers into Syria.

=== 16 November ===
According to opposition sources, Syrian army deserters attacked a military intelligence office in Harasta, near the capital Damascus, killing six soldiers and wounding more than 20. "The Syrian Free Army struck with rockets and RPGs" said Omar Idlibi, the Beirut-based spokesperson for the opposition Syrian Local Co-ordination Committees. Army defectors also killed eight soldiers and wounded dozens in an attack on a security checkpoint in the town of Kafr Zeta in Hama, the London-based Syrian Observatory for Human Rights said.

A further 17 civilians were killed when Syrian troops fired on anti-government protesters in several areas of the country, according to the opposition General Syria Revolution Committees. The bulk of the deaths were in the restive provinces of Homs and Idlib, where residents engaged in acts of civil disobedience to protest the government crackdown.

=== 17 November ===
Jordan and China add to pressure on Syria. Syrian security forces shot dead 13 people, including nine civilians and four army defectors. Syria's army is planting mines along the border of Jordan. Germany, Britain, France seek UN action against Syria.

=== 18 November – "Friday of the Expulsion of the Ambassadors" ===
Syrian security forces shot dead at least 20 people on Friday as they opened fire to disperse protesters urging countries to expel Syria's ambassadors, activists told Al Arabiya, as Russia called for restraint over the Damascus crisis. Large anti-government protests occurred in the Damascus suburbs, Aleppo, Homs, Hama, Deir Ezzor, and Daraa. The Syrian Observatory for Human Rights reported Friday that three people were killed in the Damascus countryside, while two were shot in the central protest city of Homs and another in the restive city of Hama, also in the center of the country. Five people, including a 14-year-old boy, were also shot dead in the southern town of Deraa, cradle of the uprising against Assad's autocratic regime, said the Britain-based Observatory. Around 30 people were shot and wounded in Homs, in the Damascus suburb of Harasta and in Maaret Numan in the northwestern province of Idlib, the Observatory and the opposition Local Coordination Committees (LCC) reported, according to AFP. The Syrian government has said it would agree to foreign observers but with conditions. The Arab League has not given an official response yet.

=== 19 November ===
The Arab League deadline for Damascus expired, while Syrian security forces killed at least 12 civilians, including two children, and in addition to the 25 protesters the local coordination committees said were killed on Saturday.

=== 20 November ===
There were reports of rocket-propelled grenades fired at the Baath Party building in central Damascus by the Free Syrian Army.

=== 21 November ===
At least four people were killed on Monday as Syrian security forces carried out raids in and around the flashpoint central city of Homs, rights and activist groups reported. "Two people were killed and 7 others were wounded in Homs while 2 others died and 8 were wounded in (nearby) Qusair by gunfire during raids on Monday morning by the army and security forces," said the Syrian Observatory for Human Rights. The military also raided the towns of Karnaz, Latalmleh and Kafar Nabude in the central province of Hama, the Britain-based Observatory said in a statement received in Nicosia.

=== 22 November ===
Britain, France and Germany asked the United Nations to pass a resolution condemning Syrian violence against opposition protesters.

=== 23 November ===
French foreign minister Alain Juppé assured Syrian opposition forces that NATO powers are considering to launch an intervention by imposing "humanitarian corridors or humanitarian zones" in the name of protecting civilians from the alleged abuses of the Assad regime.

The Al-Arabia network reports that 12 people were killed in clashes between Syrian security forces and anti-regime demonstrators.

=== 25 November ===
As Friday protests were held, Russia, China, and their partners in the BRICS group of emerging economies urged Syria to start talks with the opposition and warned against foreign intervention without UN backing. The deadline for Syria to avoid Arab League sanctions passed.

The Syrian military claimed that the Free Syrian Army attacked a military base in the Homs province, killing 10 members of Assad's air force. Of the 10 killed, six were "elite military pilots" in the Homs Province Ambush

=== 26 November ===
The Free Syrian Army ambushed the Syrian army in Idlib, killing eight loyalist soldiers. The Free Syrian Army had no casualties.

=== 27 November ===
The Arab League agreed on economic sanctions against Syria, including a freeze on doing business with the Central Bank of Syria and the Syrian government, a travel ban on regime officials, and a suspension of infrastructure spending by Arab governments in Syria.

=== 29 November ===
Three civilians were injured and one other killed in a raid by security forces in the town of Saraqeb. The Free Syrian Army also killed three loyalist soldiers and captured two others.

== December 2011 ==
=== 1 December ===
According to the UN, the death toll has reached over 4,000. In light of the casualties and the increasing number of defections to the Free Syrian Army, the UN is now "characterizing it as a civil war".

=== 2 December – "Friday of the Syrian Buffer Zone" ===
Tens of thousands marched in protests across Syria on Friday calling for Turkey to create a buffer zone to protect civilians, as security forces killed at least five more people, activists said. The largest protests were held in the central Homs province and in the northern town of Hama, said Rami Abdel Rahman, head of the Syrian Observatory for Human Rights. "In 17 districts (in the city of) Homs and at least nine neighbouring towns, tens of thousands of people called for the creation of a buffer zone to ensure their protection", Abdel Rahman told AFP. "On Friday, Hama saw its biggest protests since the army entered the city in August", he added. Smaller protests took place in Aleppo, in Damascus province and in the southern Deraa province.

=== 3 December ===
A total of 23 people were killed in Syria, 11 of which were civilians killed by security forces. In the province of Idlib, seven soldiers including an officer and five army defectors were killed in clashes. Tanks were also spotted moving into Idlib, and a tank was seen burning there as well. The Syrian government condemned a UN vote on human rights violations committed by the Syrian security forces. The Syrian government claimed that the vote was unjust and based on false information.

=== 4 December ===
At least a dozen Syrian secret police defected from an intelligence compound, activists said, in what appeared to be the first major desertion from a service that has acted as a pillar of President Assad's rule. A gunfight then broke out overnight after the defectors fled the Airforce Intelligence complex in the center of Idlib city. Ten people on both sides were killed or wounded, the activists said on Sunday, according to Reuters.

=== 5 December ===
A bus driver and 13 passengers inside it were abducted by shabiha near Homs, according to the Syrian Observatory for Human Rights. Seven people were reported killed in Homs Governorate by security forces, the Observatory said, and 63 people dead, at least half in Homs, were reportedly killed over the weekend. FSA fighters killed four members of the security forces, including an officer, in Dael in Deraa Governorate, according to the same report. Eighteen students were arrested, the Observatory claimed.

=== 7 December ===
An interview between Bashar al-Assad and veteran ABC News journalist Barbara Walters was released. In the interview Assad claimed that he was not responsible for the military crackdown and said he did not feel guilty because his government was doing nothing wrong.

=== 8 December ===
Activist groups said 13 people were killed by security forces throughout Syria. An oil pipeline supplying a refinery in Homs was attacked and set on fire, an attack SANA blamed on "armed terrorists" and protesters blamed on security forces and shabiha.

=== 9 December – "Friday of the Dignity Strike" ===
The Syrian Observatory for Human Rights and the Syrian Revolution General Commission reported that at least 41 people, including seven children and three army defectors, were killed by security forces attempting to derail a planned nationwide "Dignity Strike". Many of the deaths were in Homs, the de facto centre of the opposition, where Free Syrian Army units purportedly clashed with security personnel. The Syrian National Council claimed Assad's forces gathered in the thousands around the city to prepare for an "impending massacre". The military allegedly warned that Homs had 72 hours to comply with an ultimatum to end protests. Clashes and arrests also reportedly took place in Aleppo, Idlib Governorate, and Damascus.

=== 10 December ===
At least 12 died as Syrian troops attacked funeral processions and clashed with FSA defectors. The Government of France called for involvement by the international community.

=== 11 December ===
The United States Securities and Exchange Commission ordered at least a dozen U.S.-listed firms to provide details of their business in Syria and Iran, the Financial Times reported. Near the Jordanian border, more than one score of tanks from the 12th Armoured Brigade stormed Busra al-Harir, sparking what Reuters and Al Jazeera described as a "major battle" with Free Syrian Army and other armed elements in the town. Fighting was especially intense in the Lujah region of rocky hills north of Busra al-Harir, which defectors have used as a base to harass and disrupt military supply lines. Meanwhile, French Foreign Minister Alain Juppe blamed an attack on French UNIFIL peacekeepers in southern Lebanon on Hezbollah and said his government believed the attackers acted on orders from Damascus. Within Syria, many shops did not open due to a nationwide strike, and the opposition boasted of the strike effectively shutting down Damascus. Amid protests and fighting elsewhere in the country, opposition activists reported 26 killed by security forces, including nine dead in Homs, six dead in Hama, three dead in Deraa, two in Idlib, and two outside Damascus. They also claimed five Syrian soldiers were killed. The two biggest Syrian cities, Damascus and Aleppo did not follow the strike called by the opposition and most business operated as usual.

=== 12 December ===
Navi Pillay, the United Nations High Commissioner for Human Rights, said more than 5,000 had been killed in Syria since the uprising and crackdown began. Russian Foreign Minister Sergei Lavrov, whose own government faced protests during the month, defended Assad and said the West should not call for him to step down and should condemn the actions of the Free Syrian Army. In Washington, D.C., U.S. President Barack Obama met with Iraqi Prime Minister Nouri al-Maliki and discussed the subject of Syria. In a press conference after the meeting, Obama said he and Maliki disagreed on what action to take, but said he believed Maliki was taking Iraq's best interests to heart. Maliki reiterated his opposition to economic sanctions against Syria. The nationwide strike continued in Syria, and the Syrian Observatory for Human Rights reported 15 dead throughout the country, with most of the violence in Homs Governorate and Idlib Governorate.

=== 13 December ===
At least 28 people were killed during the day, activists said, with most of the deaths occurring in Idlib Governorate. Eleven civilians were allegedly gunned down after closing an arterial road, with 26 more wounded. SANA claimed 15 gunmen were intercepted trying to "infiltrate" across the Turkish border and two were killed. Lavrov, the Russian foreign minister, said after talks with his Algerian counterpart Mourad Medelci that Moscow had decided to support the Arab League's initiative in Syria and wanted observers to oversee troops' withdrawal from major Syrian cities. The Syrian Observatory for Human Rights reported that the Free Syrian Army ambushed and killed seven Syrian security troops in Bab al-Hawa in Idlib Governorate.

The FSA also killed a senior officer, Brigadier General Ghanem Ibrahim al-Hassan, SANA reported. The state-run media organ claimed that it was retaliation for the interception at the border crossing earlier that day.

In the early hours of the morning, an oil pipeline was blown up near Rastan in central Syria, with both the government and the opposition blaming each other for the attack.

The United Nations formally announced that at least 5,000 Syrians were estimated to have died in the uprising.

=== 14 December ===
Loyalist soldiers reportedly fired upon a civilian car on 14 December, killing five people, in response, the Free Syrian Army staged an ambush against a loyalist convoy consisting of four jeeps, killing eight soldiers.

A total of 25 people, 17 of whom were civilians, were reported killed on 14 December.

Security forces launched a raid on Hama aimed at ending a three-day strike by the opposition, resulting in at least ten deaths and the destruction of two armoured vehicles by armed insurgents, possibly the Free Syrian Army.

=== 15 December ===
The FSA engaged loyalist army units and security service agents south of Damascus on 15 December, leading to 27 loyalist deaths and an unknown number of FSA casualties. The clashes broke out at three separate checkpoints in Daraa province around dawn.

=== 16 December – "Friday of the Arab League Is Killing Us" ===
Hundreds of thousands of Syrians took to the streets on Friday to protest against President Bashar al-Assad, a day after Syria's big power ally Russia sharpened its criticism of Damascus in a draft United Nations resolution. As many as 22 people were killed by the gunfire of Syrian security forces during the rallies which protesters called "The Arab League is killing us", Al Arabiya reported citing Syrian activists. Friday's killings took place, activists said, after midday prayers in the eastern city of Deir al-Zour and in Homs, hotbed of opposition to four decades of repressive Assad family rule, according to Reuters. Protesters were the largest yet since August, with the Syrian Observatory for Human Rights reporting over 200,000 in Homs, as well large demonstrations in Idlib, Daraa, Deir al-Zour, Hama, Aleppo and Damascus.

=== 18 December ===
Armed clashes erupted in Syria Sunday, killing at least 15 civilians and 6 Syrian soldiers, activists said. Isolated and faced with a possible civil war, Syria appeared to be bending toward allowing Arab League observers in as a step toward ending the conflict.

=== 19 December ===
In a statement sent to AFP in Nicosia, the Syrian Observatory for Human Rights said between 60 and 70 army deserters were gunned down as they abandoned their positions in the Idlib towns of Kansafra and Kafr Awid. The Observatory reported earlier that security forces shot dead at least 6 civilians on Monday, even as Syria's regime agreed to allow Arab observers into the country to monitor a deal to end a bloody protest crackdown. According to locals, the reported death toll for the day rose to well over 100 with the killings of the army deserters, crackdowns throughout the country, and fighting between Syrian soldiers and Free Syrian soldiers.

=== 20 December ===
At least 100 Syrian army deserters were killed or wounded in clashes and 49 civilians killed Tuesday, a rights group said, as Damascus faced new demands to halt its bloody crackdown on dissent. The Gulf Cooperation Council urged the Syrian government to "immediately halt its killing machine, put an end to bloodshed, lift all signs of armed conflict and release prisoners, as a first step towards implementing the protocol".

The Syrian Observatory for Human Rights said 14 members of the security forces were killed in southern Daraa province, where the protests broke out in mid-March.

Forces loyal to Syrian President Bashar al-Assad killed 111 civilians in the northwestern province of Idlib, the Syrian Observatory for Human Rights reported.

=== 21 December ===
Syrian security forces were accused of massacring the entire village of Kfar Owaid, about 30 miles from the Turkish border, with rockets, machine guns, tanks, and nail bombs. The Syrian army surrounded the unarmed villagers in the Budnaya Valley after forcing them to flee their homes, activist groups and a witness said. The troops allegedly killed the more than 100 people trapped inside in an attack that lasted for hours, in one of the deadliest single events of the uprising to date.

Under a new law, the Syrian government said it would execute anyone smuggling weapons for the sake of committing "terrorist acts". According to Al Jazeera, became clear that "army defectors have taken control over some towns and villages, almost as though they have created some sort of safe area, where protesters from other regions were seeking a safe haven and where defectors were able to operate from".

The Syrian official media reported that the army arrested tens of armed men and seized weapons in operations across the country.

SANA reported that Assad supporters gathered in Damascus' Umayyad Square to honor the army and to watch the unveiling of a 7-meter statue of a Syrian soldier.

=== 22 December ===
Fresh raids and gunfire by government forces on Thursday killed at least 19 people, most of them in the central city of Homs and northern Idlib province, according to the London-based Syrian Observatory for Human Rights and the Local Coordination Committees. The Syrian government updated the casualty figures of its soldiers to 2,000, as the Arab League prepared an agreed observer mission into the country, amongst rising civilian, defector, and soldier deaths from ongoing clashes in the Zawiya mountains near Idlib.

=== 23 December – "Friday of the Protocol of Death" ===
Two car bombings in Damascus at security offices killed civilians and some soldiers, leaving 44 dead and 163 wounded. Syrian officials said that Al Qaeda was suspected of carrying out the attack. A website, which supposedly belonged to the Muslim Brotherhood, emerged claiming the attacks. It was later revealed that the website was fake and made by the Syrian regime only one day before the bombings. Also, many members of the organization were interviewed on several channels and denied any relation between them and the Damascus events. Meanwhile, the opposition said the Syrian government may have orchestrated the attacks to reinforce its narrative of a country beset by terrorist-related violence. The government of Lebanon had reportedly warned Damascus two days prior that Al Qaida infiltrated Syria from Arsal, Lebanon.

Daily Friday protests occurred throughout Syria, most notably in Idlib, Homs, Qamishli, Hama, Damascus and its suburbs. As many as 28 people were killed as Syrian security forces continued with its crackdown against protesters and dissents in the country, Al Arabiya reported, citing Syrian activists.

=== 24 December ===
Thousands rallied in support of Assad in Damascus at the funeral of the victims of the previous day's bombings, blaming the attacks on the Syrian opposition and Qatar. Arab League Secretary-General Nabil Elaraby condemned the attacks in a statement. Meanwhile, Oil Minister Sufian Allaw said oil production in Syria had fallen by between 30 percent and 35 percent due to foreign sanctions preventing exports. Sudanese General Mohammed Ahmed Mustafa al-Dabi, the leader of a planned Arab League observer mission, arrived in Damascus to meet with the Syrian government ahead of the mission's official start.

=== 25 December ===
Burhan Ghalioun called for the Arab League and the United Nations Security Council to coordinate efforts to hold the Syrian government accountable for the bloodshed. In the Homsi neighborhood of Baba Amr, at least 15 civilians were killed by artillery bombardment, activists said. As many as 4,000 soldiers were reported to have surrounded the city.

=== 26 December ===
Residents said at least 34 were killed in Homs, while the Syrian Observatory for Human Rights in London said four died in Hama, two died in Idlib, one died in Daraa, and one more died in a suburb of Damascus as a result of security forces' actions, for a total death toll of 42 throughout the country related to the uprising for the day. Some Homs residents posted amateur video to the Internet showing what appear to be army tanks moving through the city, firing on apartment buildings with machine guns and mortar rounds, and mangled bodies and pools of blood, as well as ruined cars and power lines, in the streets of the city. At least one resident reported seeing army ambulances carrying wounded soldiers, suggesting that militant elements of the Syrian opposition were fighting back against the military crackdown in Homs. The Observatory also reported clashes and arrests in Aleppo. Meanwhile, 50 Arab League monitors headed to Damascus as opposition members sought to downplay the mission, saying Syrian authorities were likely to stymie its chances of uncovering the truth and block observers' access to some of the worst-hit parts of the country, and the French government insisted on greater transparency. The observers arrived in the Syrian capital after sundown, sources told Reuters.

=== 27 December ===
At least 11 tanks that had been shelling the neighbourhood of Baba Amr in Homs, according to residents and opposition activists, reportedly withdrew ahead of Arab League monitors' visit to the city. More than 2,000 Homsis turned out for a sit-in protest awaiting the Arab League team's arrival, an activist said. Al Jazeera reported thousands more marched in protest at the funeral of a city resident killed the previous day. The Syrian Observatory for Human Rights put the number of protesters in the Khalidiyah neighbourhood at 20,000, while the Local Co-ordinating Committees said turnout there was closer to 35,000.

Over 70,000 protesters reportedly converged on Clock Square in the center of the city, apparently after hearing Arab League monitors were in the area, but an activist said security forces began firing tear gas and live ammunition and prevented them from occupying the square. Elsewhere in Homs, including in besieged Baba Amr, the Observatory said gunfire, including volleys from snipers, impaired the free movement of residents. Although General Dabi, the leader of the observer team, said the day proceeded well and "all sides were very responsive", amateur video footage posted on the Internet appeared to show anti-government Homsis unsuccessfully pleading with monitors to travel further into the Baba Amr neighbourhood, where extensive violence had been reported.

Avaaz claimed similar scenes of civil protest and regime violence in Hama, where thousands of demonstrators marching to al-Assi Square in the city centre were scattered by troops firing live ammunition, according to activists. Thirty-three deaths were reported in total throughout Syria by the LCC, including 13 in Homs, four in Daraa, four near Damascus, three at Damascus University, three in Hama, three in Idlib, two in Deir ez-Zor, and one in Latakia. The incident at Damascus University occurred when, the Observatory claimed, a student recently detained and tortured by the regime opened fire on fellow students who vocally supported Assad. The Syrian Arab News Agency reported on the school shooting, but made no mention of any political motivation on the shooter's part. SANA also claimed a terrorist attack shut down a natural gas pumping operation in Homs Governorate.

=== 28 December ===
At least 13 people were killed in fresh violence across Syria, activists said, as Arab League observers continued their mission. Six of the dead were reportedly killed while protesting in Hama. Local rights groups say others were killed in Homs, Aleppo, and Idlib. Video shared by activists from the protest in Hama showed gunshots being fired and black smoke rising above the city. Dozens of men were marching through the streets, chanting "Where are the Arab monitors?" In Deraa, army defectors killed at least four Syrian soldiers in an ambush.

=== 29 December ===
Protesters demanded the removal of Mustafa Dabi as leader of the Arab League monitoring team as observers visited Hama, where six more people were killed, according to the Syrian Observatory for Human Rights. Al Jazeera reported that an anonymous official with the observing mission in Syria had said monitors had witnessed shelling in Homs and it was apparent some parts of the city were controlled by the Free Syrian Army. The official, whose report directly contradicted Dabi's account of the situation, predicted the mission was doomed to fail. The LCC put the nationwide death toll at 35 for the day, while the Observatory said 26 were confirmed dead, with four deaths allegedly occurring in Douma after security forces fired live ammunition into a crowd of about 20,000 massing at its Grand Mosque for a protest ahead of an expected visit by Arab League observers. The Observatory said Douma residents responded to the shootings in their city by organising a mass strike and flooding into the city square for a sit-in thousands strong. The report could not be immediately confirmed, nor could rumours that Arab League vehicles were sighted in Douma. Hundreds also reportedly protested in Midan, a central Damascus neighbourhood, before being dispersed by soldiers shooting tear gas. The Observatory claimed 150,000 marched in the streets in Idlib Governorate, its largest demonstration in recent days. After meeting with Nabil Elaraby, head of the Arab League, Syrian National Council leader Burhan Ghalioun said he feared the Syrian government held more than 100,000 detainees and could execute them "to say there are no prisoners" if Arab League monitors demanded access to facilities in which they are imprisoned.

=== 30 December – "Friday of the March to the Freedom Squares" ===
Activists said more than 130 protesters had been confirmed killed, including six children, since the Arab League observers arrived in Syria earlier in the week. During the day, that reported death toll grew to 32 following attacks from security forces. BBC News gave a death toll of 35 for the day. In what seemed to be the largest day of demonstrating, with more than 500,000 people demonstrating in two governorates alone: Hama and Idlib, over 6 million people are said to have rallied in Syria against Bashar al-Assad, according to activists. Tens of thousands protested in Damascus, as well as tens of thousands in Homs. Smaller demonstrations occurred in Daraa, Deir Ezzor, and Aleppo. Amateur video posted online appeared to show an orange-vested Arab League observer in Daraa responding to residents' claims that snipers were nearby by saying he had seen the snipers himself and telling them the monitors planned to ask the Syrian government to remove any snipers from Daraa within 24 hours. In Cairo, the SNC and the National Coordination Body for Democratic Change in Syria signed onto a political roadmap for a transition to democracy in Syria to be put into effect if Assad is deposed.

=== 31 December ===
Activists reported at least nine deaths, at least three of them in Homs, at least one in Damascus, and at least one in Abu Kamal, as security forces attacked large protests across the country. The LCC said some protests evolved from funeral marches for demonstrators killed the day before. Al Jazeera reported that the number of statements received by the network from Arab League observers critical of the regime's crackdown had mounted over the past two days. Meanwhile, the SNC signed a deal with the National Co-ordination Committee, to work together on developing a "parliamentary system for a democratic, pluralistic civil state [that] guarantees the exchange of power through elections".

The head of the Arab League's observing team, General Mustafa Dabi, said in an interview with the BBC News on Newshour that no observers saw snipers in Deraa, contradicting amateur video showing an observer telling activists he saw snipers in the city centre. Dabi claimed that the observer was making "a hypothetical remark only".
