= Mohja Kahf =

American poet

- مهجة قحف
- Born: 1967 (age 58–59); Damascus, Syria
- Known for: Poetry
- Movement: Syrian Nonviolence Movement
- Awards: Pushcart Prize, 2010
- Honours: Arkansas Arts Council Individual Artist Fellowship for Poetry, 2002

Mohja Kahf (Arabic: مهجة قحف, born 1967) is a Syrian-American poet, novelist, and professor. She authored Hagar Poems, which won honorable mention in the 2017 Book Awards of the Arab American National Museum. She is the recipient of the 2010 Pushcart Prize for her creative nonfiction essay, "The Caul of Inshallah", and the Arkansas Arts Council Individual Artist Fellowship in 2002 for poetry. Her poetry has been featured in the installments of American neo-conceptual artist Jenny Holzer.

== Early life ==
Kahf was born in Damascus, Syria. In March 1971, at the age of three and a half, she moved to the United States. She grew up in a devout Muslim household. Both of her parents came to the United States as students at the University of Utah. Kahf and her family moved to Indiana after her parents received their university degrees. When she was in the tenth grade, she and her family moved to New Jersey. Kahf is the eldest of eight siblings, one of whom died as a five-year-old child in Indianapolis, Indiana.

Kahf's maternal grandmother, Samia Bianouni (1921-2018) of Aleppo, was a school principal in Damascus for twenty years. Her maternal grandfather, Muhammad al-Mubarak, was a member of the Syrian parliament in the 1950s, and was exiled from Syria because of his opposition to the Baathist regime. Her father was, for a time, a member of the Muslim Brotherhood, an organization that was banned in Syria, and was exiled from Syria as a result. Kahf's mother trained as a pharmacist. Kahf's paternal grandmother, Adiba Quzaiz (d. 1962), was a talented dressmaker well-known to fashionable women all over Damascus in her heyday. Her husband, Kahf's paternal grandfather, was a jovial but often down-on-his-luck merchant who never fully recovered from losses during Syria's colonized period under the French Mandate; it was his wife, Adiba Quzaiz, who owned the home in which the family lived.

Kahf graduated from Douglass College in 1988, when she was inducted to the Phi Beta Kappa National Honor Society. She received her Ph.D. in comparative literature from Rutgers, the State University of New Jersey in 1994. In 1995 she became a professor at the English Department of the University of Arkansas, Fayetteville, where she serves in the University of Arkansas' Program for Comparative Literature and Cultural Studies and Program for Middle East Studies.

During her time as a women's studies instructor at Rutgers, Kahf taught theories of feminism, and the work of Palestinian resistance women, Indigenous American women, and Black Power movement women. After her move to Arkansas, Kahf served for a time on the board of the Ozark Poets and Writers Collective, participated in local poetry slams and, after winning a spot on "Team Ozarks" with Brenda Moossy, Lisa Martinovic, and Pat Jackson, represented the region with the all-women team at the 1999 National Poetry Slam in Chicago,

Kahf was a founding member of RAWI, the Radius of Arab American Writers, established in 1993 Kahf became a member of the Syrian Nonviolence Movement upon its founding in Syria in 2011. In 2011, Kahf visited the Turkish border with Syria in order to work with Syrian escapees. Kahf wrote about the experience in the essay "The Daughter's Road to Syria." Kahf attended marches protesting the United States' War on Iraq.

== Literary career ==
Challenging both Orientalist representations of Arab women and patriarchal orthodoxies within and without Muslim communities, Kahf's poetry and fiction explores complex entanglements of faith, desire, gender, and political belonging. Syria, ethics, human rights, the body, gender, and erotics often feature in her work. In her poetry book E-mails From Scheherazad, Kahf explores different Arab and Muslim identities and practices, frequently using humor. She reconfigures female figures of the Islamic tradition, particularly in Hagar Poems.

Poems in Kahf's third poetry book, My Lover Feeds Me Grapefruit explore hunger and desire, food and eros, friendship and love. Hagar Poems won honorable mention in the 2017 Book Awards of the Arab American National Museum. Kahf won a Pushcart Prize for her creative nonfiction essay, "The Caul of Inshallah," about the difficult birth of her son, first published in River Teeth in 2010. Kahf's first book of poetry, E-mails From Scheherazad, was a finalist for the 2004 Paterson Poetry Prize. Her novel The Girl in the Tangerine Scarf was a "One Book" reading at Indiana University East (Richmond, Indiana) in 2017. The novel was chosen as Book Sense Reading Group Favorite for June 2007 and as book of the year for the One Book, One Bloomington Series by the Bloomington Arts Council, Monroe County Public Library, Bloomington, Indiana, 2008. Kahf won the Arkansas Arts Council Individual Artist Fellowship in 2002, for poetry.

In 2004, Kahf had a column exploring sexual topics on the progressive Muslim website MuslimWakeUp!.com. The column was called "Sex and the Umma" and featured short stories by her; she also hosted guest writers on the column, including Randa Jarrar, Michael Muhammad Knight, and Laila Al-Marayati. The first column published, a short story by Kahf, "Lustrous Companions," was later re-published on the website loveinshallah.com. Kahf's work on "Sex and the Umma" "earned her a torrent of attacks...the author, though at once playful and mischievous verbally and thematically, seems to be putting across an alternative image of Islam...a more progressive...one" says Layla Maleh.

Kahf's work has been translated into Japanese, Italian, and Arabic. Her poetry features in the BBC documentary, Poems from Syria.Kahf spoke at the 16^{th} Annual Toni Cade Bambara Scholar-Activist Conference held at Spelman College, Atlanta, Georgia, organized by Dr. Bahati Kuumba. Kahf criticizes some of her own earlier writing, in her article, "Calling in The Girl in the Tangerine Scarf on Indigeneity,” published in the journal of MELUS: Multi-Ethnic Literature in the United States in 2024, for "inexcusably" contributing to the colonial-settler narrative of Indigenous erasure.

== Published works ==
=== Poetry ===
- Hagar Poems, 2016, University of Arkansas Press
- E-mails from Scheherazad 2003, University Press of Florida
- My Lover Feeds Me Grapefruit. 2020. Press 53.

==== Poems in journals and anthologies ====
- "What Do We Do During a Genocide," ArabLit Quarterly, November 2023.
- “The Aunty Poem (Mi Privilege Es Su Privilege)," Poem-a-Day, Academy of American Poets, April 1, 2022.
- "Aleppo the Necklace Broke All the Words Fell Apart" & "Flora Fauna Syria," Sukoon: Arab-Themed Art & Literature
- "My People Are Rising" Mizna: Prose, Poetry, and Art Exploring Arab America, Vol. 13, Issue 1, pp. 4–6. April 2012.
- "Brenda Unbound", Banipal, Magazine of Modern Arab Literature, #38. London. pp. 50–52.
- "Little Mosque Poems." Journal of Pan African Studies, 2010, Vol. 4 Issue 2, p106-113.
- "Asiya's Aberrance," I Go to the Ruined Place: Contemporary Poems in Defense of Global Human Rights, ed. Melissa Kwasny & M.L. Smoker. Lost Horse Press, 2009. pp. 55–57.
- "Lifting the Hajar Heel" p. 84, Language for a New Century: Contemporary Voices from the Middle East, Asia, and Beyond, ed. Carolyn Forche, Ravi Shankar, Tina Chang, Nathalie Handal. W.W. Norton, 2008.
- "My Grandmother Washes Her Feet in the Sink of the Bathroom at Sears," Hayan Charara, ed., Inclined to Speak: Contemporary Arab American Poetry, U of Arkansas Press, 2008, pp. 171–176.
- "The Mihrab of the Mind," The Atlanta Review, Fall/Winter 2007, p. 37.
- "Sarah's Laugh II" & "Hagar's Ram," Tiferet: A Journal of Spiritual Literature, Issue 5, 2007, p. 15-16.
- "On Reading Marge Piercy," Natural Bridge, #16, Fall 2006, p. 55.
- "The Ladies on the Stoop" & "Balqis Makes Solomon Sign a Pre-Nup" Pakistani Journal of Women's Studies, Winter 2004
- "Pears in the Time of Burnished Gold," in Bascove, ed., Sustenance and Desire: A Food Lover's Anthology of Sensuality and Humor, David R. Godine, 2004, pp. 95–96.
- "Copulation in English." Paris Review #164 Winter 2002-2003, p. 76.

=== Fiction ===
- Novel, The Girl in the Tangerine Scarf 2006, Carroll & Graf
- "Manar of Hama," "The Spiced Chicken Queen," Pauline Kaldas & Khaled Mattawa, ed., Dinarzad's Children: Arab American Fiction, University of Arkansas Press, 1st Edition, 2005.
- "The Girl from Mecca," Feminist Studies, 2012, Issue 38, pp 73–83.

=== Prose ===
- "Human Rights Is the Hand-Hold, Pass It On," ed. Carolina DeRobertis, Radical Hope: Letters of Love and Dissent in Dangerous Times. Knopf, 2017.
- "Human Rights First" Democracy: A Journal of Ideas Fall 2016 #42.
- With Maciej Bartkowski, "The Syrian Resistance: a Tale of Two Struggles" OpenDemocracy September 23, 2013.
- "Then and Now: The Syrian Revolution to Date," Friends for a Non-Violent World, Saint Paul, Minnesota February 28, 2013.
- "Lord, Make Me Not Oblivious," Anne Richards & Iraj Omidvar, Muslims in American Popular Culture, Praeger, Nov. 2013, pp. 425–441.
- "Purple Ihram and the Feminine Beatitudes of Hajj," New Geographies, Issue 3, 2011, pp 114–121.
- "The Caul of Inshallah," Bill Henderson, ed., 2011 Pushcart Prize XXXV: Best of the Small Presses. Pushcart Prize Fellowships, 2011, pp. 458–461.

=== Scholarship ===
- "Calling in The Girl in the Tangerine Scarf on Indigeneity,” MELUS: Multi-Ethnic Literature in the United States, Sept. 2024, 49:2, 160-181.
- Western Representations of the Muslim Woman: From Termagant to Odalisque 1999 U of Texas Press
- "Writing on Muslim Gender Issues in the West Today: Slipping Past the Pity Committee," in Rabab Abdal Hadi, et al, ed., Arab and Arab American Feminisms: Gender, Violence, and Belonging, Syracuse University Press, 2011.
- "From Her Royal Body the Robe Was Removed: The Blessings of the Veil and the Trauma of Forced Unveiling in the Middle East," Jennifer Heath, ed., The Veil:Its History, Lore, and Politics, Berkeley: U California Press, April 2008.
- "The Silences of Contemporary Syrian Literature" World Literature Today, Spring 2001.
- "Politics and Erotics in Nizar Kabbani's Poetry: From the Sultan's Wife to the Lady Friend" World Literature Today, Winter 2000.
- "Packaging Huda: Sha'rawi's Memoirs in the US Reading Environment" in Amal Amireh & Lisa Suhair Majaj, ed., Going Global: The Transitional Reception of Third World Women Writers, Garland, 2000.
- "Braiding the Stories: Women's Eloquence in the Early Islamic Era" in Gisela Webb, ed., Windows of Faith: Muslim Women's Scholarship and Activism, Syracuse University Press, 2000.

== Critical studies on Kahf's work ==
- Abdurraqib, Samaa. “Making It Survive Here and 'Dreams of Return': Community and Identity in the Poetry of Mohja Kahf.” pp. 449-462 IN: Al Maleh, Layla (ed.) Arab Voices in Diaspora: Critical Perspectives on Anglophone Arab Literature. Amsterdam, Netherlands: Rodopi; 2009.
- Aghasi, Maya. “World Literature in the World? Kahf’s The Girl in the Tangerine Scarf and the Transnational Reading Public.” Journal of World Literature; 2021; 6(4) 593-61.
- Harb, Sirène. "Arab American Women's Writing and September 11: Contrapuntality and Associative Remembering," MELUS (Multi-Ethnic Literature of the United States). Fall 2012, Vol. 37 Issue 3, p13-41.
- Harb, Sirène. "Perspectives on Violence and Reconciliation: Arab-American Women's Writing About September 11." Dissidences: Hispanic Journal of Theory and Criticism 4.8 (2012): 1-15.
- Fadda-Conrey, Carol. "Arab American Citizenship in Crisis: Destabilizing Representations of Arabs and Muslims in the US after 9/11." MFS: Modern Fiction Studies, 2011 Fall; 57 (3): 532-555.
- Noskova, Martina, "'Sex and the Umma: Sex and Religion Lived in Mohja Kahf's Columns," Theory and Practice in English Studies #4 2005.
- Sorgun, Sabiha, "'Into the state of pure surrender': Spirituality in Mohja Kahf's The Girl in the Tangerine Scarf," 30th Annual Meeting of Southwest Texas Popular Culture and American Culture Associations, February 25–28, 2009. Albuquerque, NM.

== Musical and artistic adaptations of Kahf's poetry ==
Kahf's poetry has featured in the installments of American neo-conceptual artist Jenny Holzer.

The Longy School of Music's New Music Marathon on March 26, 2026, premiered a musical adaptation of Kahf's poem expressing feminist defiance of external validation, "Ishtar Awakens in Chicago" (from her first poetry book, E-mails from Scheherazad).

"Song of the Unseen" is a musical composition for the Kahf poem "Let No Despair," with its music composed by Joseph Gregorio for Arete Music Imprints, performed by Viva Voce choir (Andrew Nemeth & Allison Secour, directors) at Penn High School, Mishawaka, Indiana, May 29 2025.

"Unbound Angels" by Kahf was set to music by composer Joseph Gregorio, published with score and performed by South Bend Chamber Singers, Nancy Menk, director, St. Mary's College, South Bend, Indiana, for a holiday concert in December, 2022. The poem was commissioned by Gregorio for the music.

Carol Barnett set to music Mohja Kahf's 2011 poem about the early stages of the Syrian Revolution, "My People Are Rising" for MorningStar Music, performed by Elektra Women's Choir & Peninsula Women's Chorus, 2018.

Kahf's poem "Two Friends Like Fireflies" was set to music composed by Joseph Gregorio, commissioned by the Women's Commission Consortium of the American Choral Director's Association, and premiered by the Soli Deo Gloria Women's Chorale.

== See also ==
- Daniel Abdal-Hayy Moore
- Marvin X
