= The Girl in the Tangerine Scarf =

The Girl in the Tangerine Scarf is a novel written by American author Mohja Kahf and published in 2006. The story chronicles Syrian immigrant Khadra Shamy, a young woman growing up in a devout, tightly knit Muslim family in 1970s Indiana, at the crossroads of bad polyester and Islamic dress codes. Along with her brother Eyad and her African American friends, Hakim and Hanifa, she bikes the Indianapolis streets exploring the fault lines between Muslim and American. When her picture-perfect marriage goes sour, Khadra flees to Syria and learns how to pray again. On returning to America she works in an eastern state—taking care to stay away from Indiana, where the murder of her friend Tayiba's sister by Klan violence years before still haunts her. But when her job sends her to cover a national Islamic conference in Indianapolis, she's back on familiar ground finding herself attending a concert by her brother's interfaith band The Clash of the Civilizations, dodging questions from the "aunties" and "uncles," and running into the recently divorced Hakim everywhere.
