= Supreme Council (Lebanon) =

The Supreme Council (المجلس الأعلى) of Lebanon is a judicial body charged with trying presidents and ministers in matters of impeachment. Article 80 of the Constitution of Lebanon specifies that the Supreme Council consists of seven deputies elected by the Chamber of Deputies and of eight of the highest-ranking Lebanese judges.

== History ==
In the wake of the 2020 Beirut port explosion, Speaker Nabih Berri proposed that the Supreme Council "be elected to try presidents and ministers".

== See also ==
- Constitutional Council (Lebanon)
