= Sustainable Development Goals and Lebanon =

Plans towards the advancement of the Sustainable Development Goals in Lebanon

Sustainable Development Goals and Lebanon explains major contributions launched in Lebanon towards the advancement of the Sustainable Development Goals SDGs and the 2030 agenda.

Lebanon adopted the Sustainable Development Goals in 2015. It presented its first Voluntary National Review (VNR) in 2018 at the High Level Political Forum in New York. A national committee chaired by the Lebanese Prime Minister is leading the work on the SDGs in the country. In 2019, Lebanon's overall performance in the SDG Index ranked 6th out of 21 countries in the Arab region.

Multi-stakeholder forums were held by different UN agencies including the UN Global Compact Network in Lebanon during the late 2010s for the advancement of Global Goals and their Impact on Businesses in Lebanon. The latest two were held in October 2018 and October 2019 under the title of connecting the global goals to Local Businesses.

== Background ==
Flag of Lebanon

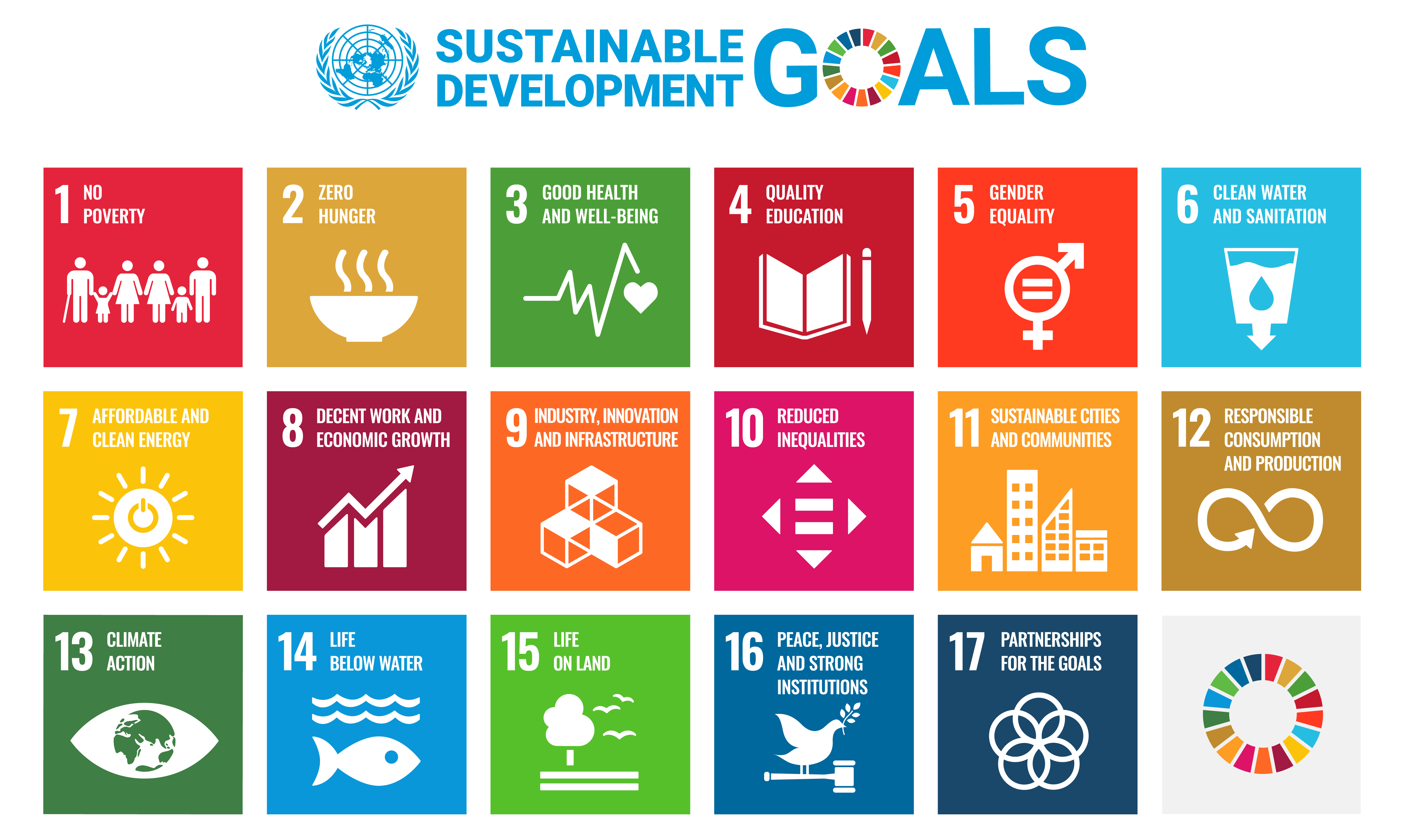
The 17 Sustainable Development Goals

=== Sustainable Development Prioritized Goals ===
Lebanon has always faced different challenges in terms of creating a clear vision plan that would develop and advance policy to improve the SDG implementation strategy. However, there are developmental attempts by the United Nations Global Compact to lead impactful initiatives to integrate best SDG practices on terms of advancing the private sector to meet up with 2030 Agenda expectations.

=== Lebanese Contributions to SDG Agenda ===
Lebanon has been a lively participant in the process associated with the SDGs. Initially, it contributed to the report back presented in the UN Conference on Sustainable Development. Lebanon has also been part of the national consultations to produce inputs during the formulation of the SDGs, and so participated within the summits referring to sustainable development and therefore the SDGs. Lebanon endorsed the 2030 Agenda for Sustainable Development and also the SDGs in September 2015.

In 2015, there was a global call to advance leadership attention on poverty, inequality, and the climate change crisis. For this to happen, on 25 September 2015 world leaders assembled at the United Nations headquarters in New York, to adopt the 2030 Agenda for Sustainable Development replacing MDGs.

In this 2030 Agenda, 17 new Sustainable Development Goals (SDGs) were listed to act as a guided path for the upcoming 15 years to make the world a better place for anyone, anywhere.

Lebanon's showed a complex performance indicator regarding MDGs. Hence, Lebanon has been a target for development challenges on all levels, social, economical, and environmental. The Syrian crisis increased the severity of the challenges.

There was no actual improvement on the level of bringing to light the need for a national developmental strategy to enhance SDG status in Lebanon all the way through 2016. Adding to this, the originally found issue linked to the Syrian crisis impact on the well-being of the country prevented further infrastructure advancement.

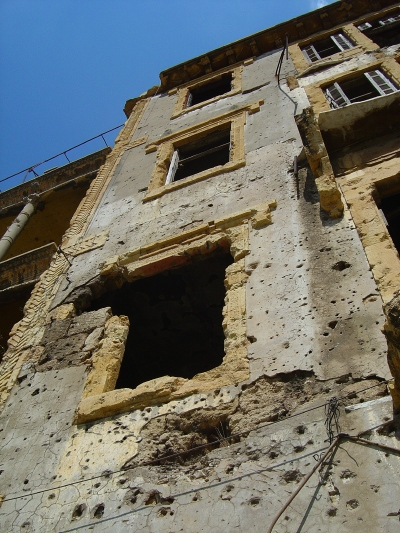
War Damaged Building in Beirut

=== Lebanon and the Millennium Development Goals ===
In 2000, the United Nations General Assembly embraced the Millennium Declaration, setting eight worldwide targets – the Millennium Development Goals to be achieved by 2015. The MDGs targeted different critical issues from poverty and education to the private sector's enrollment in the country's advancement. Lebanon submitted two reports on the Millennium Development Goals, in 2003 and 2008 respectively. The second report made eight recommendations, which included the need to create a private-public partnership for health, the promotion of the ICT sector as an economy driver, promote development finance and facilitate favorable market access for Lebanese goods and WTO accession.

Since then, Lebanon has been in turmoil following multiple events resulting in political and security instability. The 2006 war damaged infrastructure and public services and caused the contamination of agricultural lands, and the coastal sea due to a large oil spill. The hostilities resulted caused the death of 1200 civilians and injured around 5000 people, 15% of whom are now with permanent disabilities. The war's toll on the Lebanese economy, communities and human capital, impacted progress on the MDGs.

On June 5, 2012, leading up to the world summit, the President of the Republic of Lebanon addressed the people calling for a "conscience awakening". He acclaimed that the Rio+20 summit is a "milestone on the path that we took in re-placing Lebanon on the international map and stressing on its civilizational and cultural status in the world." His call to action was around making Lebanon a country of freedom and coexistence but most importantly, development.

Later on in 2013, 5 key priorities were identified during focus groups and national consultations. First, the country needed basic services mainly in the areas of health and education. Second, there was a major need for good governance and political reforms to tackle corruption and sectarian politics. It was also essential to advance structural reforms such as the secularization of the state and the adoption of a sound electoral law that secures the equitable representation of all the Lebanese and the creation of a culture of citizenship. The third major priority was around peace building and conflict prevention. The fourth one was about the enhancement of the infrastructure and public transportation and finally the fifth priority was about inclusive growth and job creation.

=== Lebanon and the Sustainable Development Goals ===
The 2030 Agenda for Sustainable Development was adopted by all United Nations Member States back in 2015. The SDGs are a set of 17 global goals to transform our world. They are an urgent call for action addressed by and for all countries for a global partnership. The SDGs span across different developmental areas including poverty, equality, education, economic growth and more. The 2030 agenda has 160 targets and 230 indicators.

In September 2015, Lebanon endorsed the 2030 Agenda for Sustainable Development and the SDGs. A ESCWA report, prepared in cooperation with the Lebanese Ministry of Environment in early 2015, identified six sustainable development priorities for Lebanon.

- Achieve employment generating economic growth;
- Build institutional and administrative capacities and improve governance;
- Improve social protection systems for all groups and address inequalities;
- Achieve energy security;
- Develop infrastructure and sustainable cities;
- Protect natural habitats and biodiversity.

The report noted that these priorities are aligned with the SDGs, particularly SDG 7 (energy), SDG 8 (growth and employment), SDG 9 and SDG 11 (infrastructure and cities), SDG 10 (inequality), SDG 15 (ecosystems) and SDG 16 (institutions).

== Reporting Platforms ==
=== National Government's Data Reporting Platform on the SDG indicators ===
The Lebanese government established an institutional mechanism to give stakeholders the opportunity to participate in the SDG reporting process. There is also a national committee established by the council of ministers for the SDGs. This committee is chaired by the prime minister and includes more than 50 state officials. The committee has launched a website dedicated to the present the progress of this national committee towards achieving the 2030 Agenda.

There is also a legislative institutional mechanism to monitor the SDGs within the Lebanese parliament. Ministries are also taking into consideration the integration of the SDGs within their planning such as the ministry of public health or industry.

Summary of some projects and initiatives led by the Lebanese Government to support the SDGs
	Representative Organization\Body	Initiatives\Projects
SDG1	The Ministry of Social Affairs	National Poverty Targeting Program (NPTP) Project
SDG 2	Ministry of Agriculture Ministry of Economy and Trade	Strategy 2015–2019 promoting principles of good governance; The Investment Development Authority of Lebanon, IDAL; Agricultural loans for farmers by the Central Bank; Governmental monetary control over wheat bread prices
SDG 3	Ministry of Public Health	Integrating SDG targets and indicators within its structural framework
SDG 4	Lebanese government	Adopting the strategy of equal educational opportunities for all
SDG 5	Lebanese Government	NCLW's Strategy for Women's Affairs in Lebanon 2011–2021; A ten–year strategy to empower women
SDG 6	Lebanese Government	Updating water resource supplies and protecting wastewater networks
SDG 7	Council of Ministers	A 5 Year strategy to enhance the electricity sector
SDG 8	Ministry of Economy and Trade	Lebanon SME Strategy: A roadmap to 2020
SDG 9	Ministry of Industry	Integrating the vision of a better Lebanese industry by 2025
SDG 10	Ministry of Public Health Ministry of Labour	Social protection policies and health insurance; A five-year intensive strategy with the support of ILO
SDG 11	The Ministry of State for Planning	Improving a national urban Strategy and the 'Habitat III National Report for Lebanon'
SDG 12	The Ministries of Environment and Industry	Lebanon's Action Plan for Sustainable Consumption and Production for the Industrial Sector in 2015
SDG 13	Council of Ministers	Lebanon signed the Paris Agreement in 2016 which was under study until further time period
SDG 14	Council for Development and Reconstruction	National Physical Master Plan of the Lebanese Territory
SDG 15	Lebanese government	National Action Plan to Combat Desertification; National Afforestation and Reforestation Programme and the 40 Million Trees Programme
SDG 16	Ministry of Foreign Affairs and Emigrants collaborating with EU	Drafting a national counter terrorism strategy
SDG 17	Lebanese and French Governments	Lebanon - CEDRE Conference (6 April 2018)

== Performance ==
=== Voluntary National Reviews ===
==== 2018 Voluntary National Review ====
Lebanon presented its first Voluntary National Review (VNR) at the UN High Level Political Forum on Sustainable Development (HLPF) in 2018.

The VNR highlighted the importance of public-private-partnerships in the Lebanese economy and the need for SDG financing and private sector mobilization. The Syrian refugee crisis and its impact on public services and the economy has made the implementation of the 2030 Agenda very challenging.

The VNR was prepared by an independent national committee chaired by the Prime Minister. Workshops, meetings, and consultation sessions were conducted with national stakeholders.

The VNR introduced the present conjuncture of the SDG implementation in Lebanon in the areas where the agreement with the 2030 agenda is still fragile or absent.

Lebanon used a certain methodology to write the VNR. The collection of data from primary resources, included extensive consultation with key ministries, parliament, and other state entities, was done as a first step. A survey consisting of short questions was also sent to all relevant public-sector administrations to gather facts and details on national policies and strategies related to the SDGs. Moreover, three workshops with government representatives, business sector, and civil society took place. Twenty-three interviews with individual stakeholders including academia were performed. The second step consisted of a review of secondary sources including sectoral strategies, ministry reports, plans and legislations. Thematic publications as well as reports by UN agencies and well-established international organizations were also used.

=== SDG Index ===
In 2020, Lebanon's overall performance in the SDG Index ranked 95th out of 166 countries. Lebanon scored 66.7

Assessment in 2020 - SDG Dashboard
SDG	Status	SDG Trends
SDG 1	Achieved	On track or maintaining SDG achievement
SDG 2	Major Challenges Remain	Stagnating
SDG 3	Significant Challenges Remain	Moderately improving
SDG 4	Significant challenges remain	Stagnating
SDG 5	Major Challenges Remain	Stagnating
SDG 6	Significant challenges remain	Moderately improving
SDG 7	Challenges remain	Moderately improving
SDG 8	Major Challenges Remain	Stagnating
SDG 9	Significant challenges remain	Moderately improving
SDG 10	Significant challenges remain	Information unavailable
SDG 11	Significant challenges remain	Decreasing
SDG 12	Significant Challenges Remain	Information unavailable
SDG 13	Challenges Remain	On track or maintaining SDG achievement
SDG 14	Major Challenges Remain	Stagnating
SDG 15	Significant Challenges remain	Stagnating
SDG 16	Significant Challenges Remain	Stagnating
SDG 17	Significant challenges remain	Decreasing

=== Private Sector ===
==== SDGs implementation and the private sector ====
Notably, the private sector in Lebanon plays a vital contribution to the overall development of the country. As stated in "Together towards Sustainable Development" a project implemented by The UNDP Lebanon they reported that the private sector has that ability and power to advance the country's status towards SDG developmental initiatives that has a positive effect over all other SDGs mainly SDG9. The private sector represents 80 percent of Lebanon's GDP. The major contributing sections are banking and finance, construction, trade and tourism. As such, the private sector is a key player for the overall strategy of the Lebanese government by providing investments and reinforcing public services through partnerships with the private sector. In 2013, a draft law on public-private partnerships (PPPs) was launched by the Higher Council on Privatization.

In 2012, UNDP launched the "Strategy for Working with the Private Sector", to advance sustainable human development by engaging the private section and support "appropriate inclusive market-based solutions and approaches." The strategy explains that UNDP will be working with the private on two different fronts. First, UNDP will "act as an incubator" for the development of private sector projects on national and regional levels, thus contributing to SDG 8, economic growth. Second, UNDP will promote private sector engagement advancing the 10 principles of the UN Global Compact. Examples of partnerships with the private sector include technical and financial assistance, resource transfer, facilitating innovative private investments and advocacy.

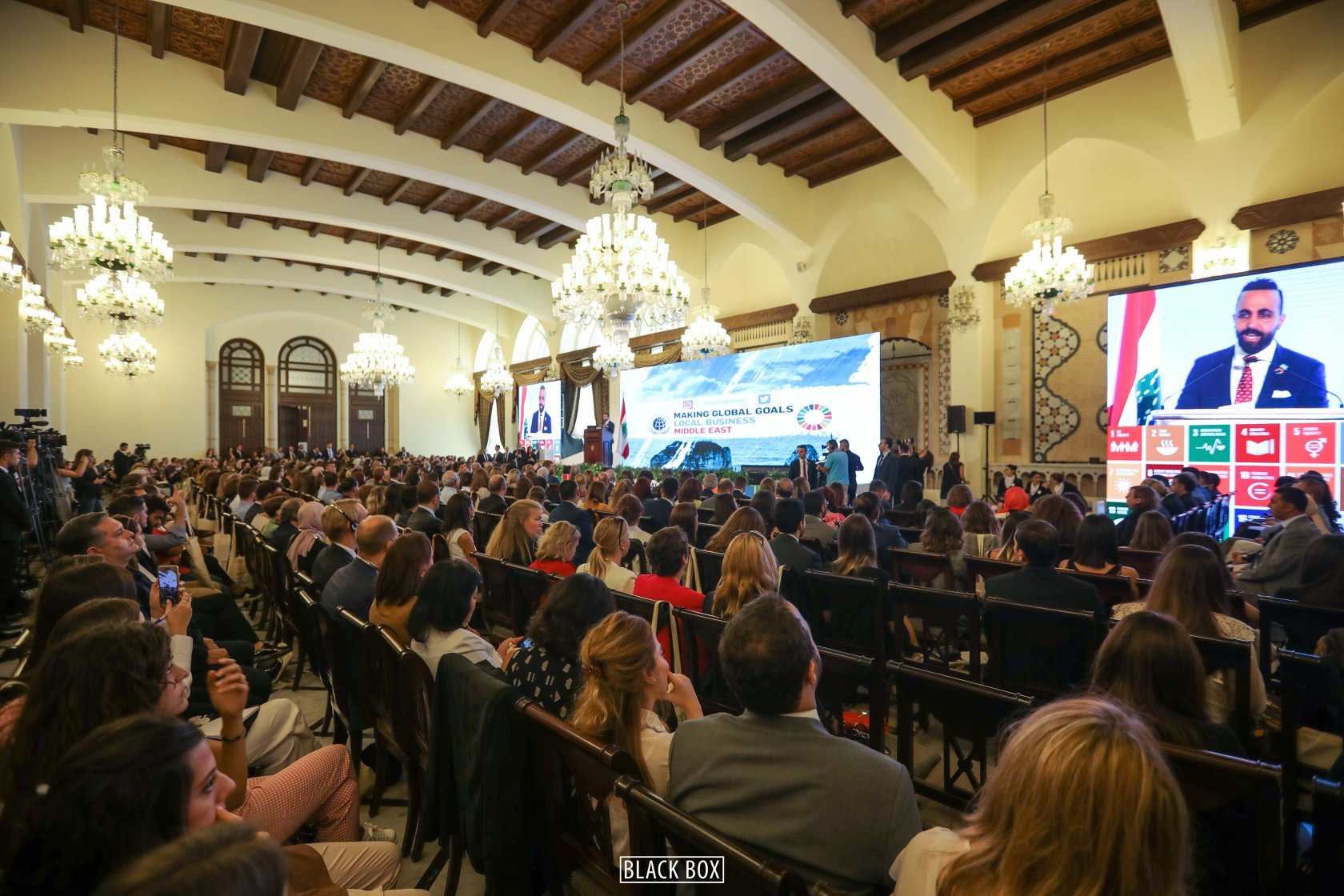
Making Global Goals Middle East Forum - Lebanon, 2019

The main platform that groups corporate sustainability initiatives in Lebanon is the local chapter of the UN Global Compact. The compact advances the 10 principles of the UN Global Compact and the 17 Sustainable Development Goals at the country level. The main mission of the local network is to build a strong understanding of responsible business and highlight sustainability commitments and efforts of Lebanese businesses and other stakeholders such as NGOs, organizations and academia. The compact works on capacity building by mainstreaming a principle-based approach to the SDGs and provide good business practices to lead the way.

The UN Global Compact Network Lebanon advances the UN Global Compact initiatives, the Ten Principles, and the UN Sustainable Development Goals (SDGs) at the country level. Its purpose is to build understanding of responsible business practices among Lebanese businesses and facilitate engagement with NGOs, government, academia and other businesses. The compact organizes local workshops, conferences and forums around the 17 SDGs including Lebanon Collaboration for the SDGs and Making Global Goals Local Business Middle-East.

== Implementation and Progress ==
=== SDG 1: No Poverty ===
In Lebanon, initiatives are implemented to support the poorest and most vulnerable communities. However, Lebanon is suffering regardless all the efforts being made. In this sense, many remain below the poverty line and risk being left behind. Considering some statistical facts, 27% of Lebanese are considered poor, spending less than $270 per month. In 2015, 70% of Syrian refugees in Lebanon spent less than $120 a month, 65% of Palestine refugees in Lebanon spent less than $210 a month and 90% of Palestine refugees from Syria spent less than $80 a month.

=== SDG 2: Zero Hunger ===
The issue in Lebanon regarding this goal is not about sufficiency of good food, but the lack of its accessibility to everyone. For this, considering the statistical indicators, 16.5% of children under 5 years old in are stunted, meaning they are not developing properly due to malnutrition. About 11% of Lebanese, 93% of Syrian refugees, 62% of Palestine refugees in Lebanon, and 94% of Palestine refugees from Syria cannot meet their basic food needs.

=== SDG 3: Good Health and Well-being ===
Lebanon has witnessed important advances that increased life expectancy and reduced some common killers, such as coronary heart disease and respiratory diseases, and improved access to quality health services.

=== SDG 4: Quality Education ===
Lebanon has a significant increase in the rate of enrollment in primary education and that is a significant increase in the educational status of the youth.

It is noted that Lebanese youth show significantly high literacy rates with a 90 percentage entrance rate in primary education. This high rate of enrollment is due to its mandatory and free aspect in public schools.

=== SDG 5: Gender Equality ===
Lebanon has proven solid achievements in equality and empowerment. Women are still suffering from inequality, on the social, political, legal and labor market aspects. In the 2016 municipal elections about 100 more women were elected than in the 2010 municipal elections, still women only represent 5.5% of the municipal council seats. Only 23.5% of women are part of the labor market, whereas the proportion of men is 70.3%. And, only 3 percent of national parliamentary seats are held by women.

=== SDG 6: Clean Water and Sanitation ===
Important improvements have been made on the level of implementing SDG 6. Most Lebanese have improved access to water supply yet the population experiences frequent water shortages. One of the issues faced is that in some Lebanese areas, the water is not safe to drink. Although, Lebanon has a relatively well established water and wastewater networks still a limited amount of water and wastewater is treated and managed safely. In this sense, up to 70% of natural water sources in Lebanon are bacterially contaminated. In 2012 Lebanon extracted 0.7 billion cubic meters of groundwater, but the groundwater is only replenished with 0.5 billion cubic meters each year.

=== SDG 7: Affordable and Clean Energy ===
It is vital aspect of Lebanese attempts in approaching SDG 7 by having a high potential to deviate away from oil as a main fuel for energy and depend more on renewable energy from resources such as sun, wind and water. Considerable efforts are needed to enhance greenhouse gas emissions and the affordability of energy. In Lebanon up to 4.5% of electricity comes from hydropower and up to 95.5% from oil. In 2012 Electricité du Liban (EDL) only met 63% of the demand for electricity in Lebanon. Around 53% of Lebanon's total greenhouse gas emissions were from the energy sector in 2012.

=== SDG 8: Decent Work and Economic Growth ===
Lebanon has witnessed immense struggle with respect to its growth rate. Regardless of these struggles, the Lebanese economy has shown a high level of resilience in the face of regional instability, supported by sectors such as tourism and construction. It is a continuous challenge for Lebanon to generate sufficient jobs which shows that high unemployment rates, especially of women and youth, as well as high emigration of educated youth out of Lebanon. It is estimated that in Lebanon youth unemployment is 21.6% and is constantly rising.

=== SDG 9: Industry, Innovation and Infrastructure ===
Lebanon is known for its youth entrepreneurial activities. This has helped small businesses to grow. A challenging aspect of Lebanese industry is related to the manufacturing exports rate that decreased by almost 30% from 2012 to 2015.

=== SDG 10: Reduced Inequalities ===
Inequalities have different faces in Lebanon that is related to income, consumption and social aspects, particularly between Beirut and rural areas. Geographical gaps exist and increased due to the manner of sending the funding directly to municipalities, particularly affecting municipalities in rural areas. Notably speaking the richest 20% in Lebanon account for 40% of all consumption, five times more than the poorest 20%. Lebanon does not have a civil code guaranteeing equal treatment for all in personal status matters such as marriage, custody and inheritance, but rather has 15 separate personal status laws that are linked to religious sects. Another important fact is that, the 244 most vulnerable municipalities host 87% of all displaced persons from Syria.

=== SDG 11: Sustainable Cities and Communities ===
It is well known about Lebanon that it has a rich urban cultural heritage, with a number of the world's oldest cities. However, huge demographic changes took place, like the increase in conflict urbanization and waves of external and internal displacements. This increased challenge makes it more difficult to sustain social coherence and ensure inclusion. Around 90% of the population in Lebanon live in urban areas and about 30% live in the Beirut metropolitan area alone. Adding to this, the majority of Syrian refugees live in urban areas, often in high density poor neighborhoods and sometimes in vulnerable conditions. More, 63% of Palestinian refugees in Lebanon and 55% of Palestinian refugees from Syria live inside camps, most of which are located in urban areas.

=== SDG 12: Responsible Production and Consumption ===
As an attempt to reduce pollution, ever since 2000, Lebanon has implemented environmental legislation requiring industries to minimize their pollution.

However, environmental governance at municipal level and national level regulation and enforcement needs to be further strengthened for better recycling and waste management. In this sense, Lebanon was able to reduce consumption of CFC (a substance that depletes the ozone layer) from 928 tons to 0 tons in less than fifteen years. In 2010, 17% of household solid waste was recycled while 83% was sent to landfills or open dumps, including potentially hazardous forms of waste.

=== SDG 13: Climate Action ===
Lebanon has signed several conventions, such as the Paris Agreement on climate change, and established several institutions dedicated to the protection of the environment. The country is vulnerable to extreme weather like winter floods and extended hot summer days. In this regard, it is expected that Lebanon can do more to reduce its contribution to climate change and increase the capacities of institutions working with environmental issues. Lebanon increased its greenhouse gas emissions, gases that are harmful to the environment and contribute to climate change, by nearly 5% annually between 1994 and 2012. It is estimated that by 2040 rainfall in Lebanon will have decreased by 10-20%. Currently, sea levels in Lebanon will rise with up to 60 cm in the next 30 years.

== Challenges ==
On July 18, 2018: the Ministerial Meeting of the 2018 session of the UN High-level Political Forum on Sustainable Development (HLPF) publicly shared the representation of 46 Voluntary National Reviews (VNRs) for three days. Its purpose was to share the development and challenges faced by the participant countries when implementing the SDGS.

Critical challenges would disqualify Lebanon from implementing the 2030 Agenda on Sustainable Development Goals. These challenges include: political instability, refugee crisis, socioeconomic policy choices, social protection, taxes, lack of data, and lack of gender equality.

The VNR included some challenges facing the implementation of the SDGs in Lebanon including the lack of strong statistical system and database for the SDG targets and indicators as well as a lack in capacity building. Public sector administration institutional capacities need to be reinforced with the help of UN bodies and international entities.

=== Political obstacles ===
The political system in Lebanon is described by the agreed division of power leading to imbalanced structure of governance. This results in political conflicts affecting the economic and institutional performance of both the public and private sector. This ineffective distribution of power leads to weak fragile institutional strategic planning and the absence of transparency. Consequently, corruption prohibits investments and developmental global project implementation. The result of this political distribution represents a limitation in decision-making towards any project or advancement.

=== Refugees crisis ===
Lebanon has faced a complex approach regarding more than one million Syrians resorted to the country for shelter. Lebanon was well known as the country that has integration of refugees within its population. This overpopulation of refugees affects the infrastructure negatively. This results in imbalanced distribution of developmental projects towards a better status of the country. Refugees, mainly Palestinians and Syrians, suffered for a long time from unequal policies for they are known as the nations who are left behind. As a report dating back to 2019, Lebanon and Jordan face the same increased crisis with 17% and 7% of the overall population respectively. The challenges faced by those communities were related to the need for mental health support, need for more advanced educational strategies and projects, and enhanced gender disparity status.

In October 2014, a governmental change took place regarding the rearrangement of Syrian refugees. Its main goal was to reduce the total number of Syrian refugees and at the same time encourage them to return to Syria, it is still an ongoing target listed on the governmental agenda.

=== Socioeconomic policy choices ===
The economical structure in Lebanon depends on a focused model on banking and financial systems and sectors. The need for rebuilding the country post the civil war depended on over-borrowing from international bodies. This is done for an exchange rate from the donors increasing a public debt that the country can't face. This concentration of investments in specific sectors failed to improve the county's economic status and attract new advanced projects from investors that would have boosted all the goals targeted by the 2030 agenda. Poverty and unemployment rates have increased within the youth giving little space for growth enhancement and a sense of competitiveness.
