= Constitutional Council (Lebanon) =

Highest constitutional authority in Lebanon

The Constitutional Council (المجلس الدستوري) of Lebanon is a judicial body charged with reviewing statutes' constitutionality and resolving disputes about presidential and representative elections. Under Lebanon's constitution, the composition and functioning of the council are to be set by statute.

== See also ==
- Supreme Council (Lebanon)
