= Mohammed Ahmed Mustafa al-Dabi =

Sudanese Ambassador to Qatar
- In office 1999–2004
- President: Omar al-Bashir

Deputy Chief of Staff for Military Operations
- In office 1996 – February 1999
- President: Omar al-Bashir

Director of Foreign Security
- In office July 1995 – November 1996
- President: Omar al-Bashir

Chief of Sudanese Military Intelligence
- In office 30 June 1989 – August 1996
- President: Omar al-Bashir

Personal details
- Born: February 1948 (age 78) Berber, Anglo-Egyptian Sudan

Military service
- Allegiance: Sudan
- Branch/service: Sudan People's Armed Forces
- Years of service: 1969 – 1999
- Rank: Lieutenant General
- Commands: Sudan People's Armed Forces
- Battles/wars: Second Sudanese Civil War War in Darfur

Lieutenant General Mohammed Ahmed Mustafa al-Dabi (Arabic: محمد أحمد مصطفى الدابي; born February 1948) is a Sudanese military commander and intelligence officer who served as head of the Arab League observer mission in Syria from December 2011 to February 2012.

al-Dabi was born in February, 1948 in the northern Sudanese town of Berber, situated in the River Nile state. He served in the Sudanese Armed Forces for 30 years, enlisting with the rank of lieutenant in 1969 (the year of Gaafar al-Nimeiri's military coup, known as the May Revolution). Following the military coup of General Omar al-Bashir in June 1989, he was appointed chief of Sudanese military intelligence. Between July 1995 and November 1996, he was head of the foreign branch of Sudanese security, and later on served as deputy chief of staff for military operations from 1996 to 1999, commanding Sudanese Forces against the insurgency in the former Southern Sudan. Sudanese rebel leaders have accused him of being involved in severe human rights violations in Darfur during the Darfur Conflict. He was presidential representative to Darfur from July till November 1999 (holding responsibility for security, with full presidential jurisdiction), and returned to serve in the same capacity in 2004.

He served as Sudan's ambassador to Qatar from 1999 to 2004, and was again appointed as an ambassador of the Sudanese foreign ministry in August 2011.

== Controversy ==
The appointment of al-Dabi as the head of the Arab League observer mission to Syria has been strongly criticised by Syrian opposition activists and human rights groups, as well as many Arab and Western media commentators. Although there is no evidence that has been brought forth pointing to his direct responsibility for warcrimes in Darfur, critics have pointed to his presence there as top-ranking military officer of the Sudanese army and government representative when massacres are said to have taken place.

Abd-al-Karim al-Rayhawi, the head of the Syrian League, told the BBC that "he won't be neutral, and would sympathise with those in similar positions, thus it won't be surprising if he supports and sympathises with the Syrian regime and its henchmen who are committing crimes against humanity round the clock in Syria," . Omar Idilbi of the Local Coordination Committees, described Dabi as a "senior officer with an oppressive regime that is known to repress opposition", adding that there are fears he might not be neutral. Haytham Manna, a prominent Paris-based dissident, urged the Arab League to replace Dabi or reduce his authority. "We know his history and his shallow experience in the area", he said. Amnesty International also criticized Dabi, saying that he led Bashir's military intelligence service until August 1995, when he was appointed head of external security in Sudan. "During the early 1990s, the military intelligence in Sudan was responsible for the arbitrary arrest and detention, enforced disappearance, and torture or other ill-treatment of numerous people in Sudan", it said in a statement. "The Arab League's decision to appoint as the head of the observer mission a Sudanese general on whose watch severe human rights violations were committed in Sudan risks undermining the League's efforts so far and seriously calls into question the mission's credibility", Amnesty said.

The controversy became even more heated when al-Dabi was reported to have commented, during the mission's visit to the city of Homs on 28 December 2011, that the situation there was 'reassuring'. al-Dabi's comments were supported a few days later in a statement released on the Russian foreign ministry website. However, later on, the observer mission released a statement denying that al-Dabi had made such statements, stating that the reports were "unfounded and not true".

The Secretary-General of the Arab League, Nabil Elaraby, has defended al-Dabi's reputation and the decision to appoint him as head of the Syrian mission. He described al-Dabi as "a capable military man with a clean reputation" and has praised the performance of both al-Dabi and the mission as a whole, stating that the mission needs to be given "a chance to prove itself on the ground". On the other hand, the Arab Parliament, a body affiliated with the Arab League, has criticised the mission's performance and on 2 January 2011 called for its immediate withdrawal. Its head, Ali Salim al-Diqbasi stated that "The mission of the Arab League team has missed its aim of stopping the killing of children and ensuring the withdrawal of troops from the Syrian streets, giving the Syrian regime a cover to commit inhumane acts under the noses of the Arab League observers".

Al Dabi submitted his resignation from the month-long Arab League observer mission on 12 February 2012.
