= Syrian Nonviolence Movement =

- Founded: November 2011
- Type: Non-profit; NGO
- Location(s): Syria/ Global Registered in Paris
- Services: achieve social, cultural and political change in the Syrian state and society
- Fields: Media attention, awareness campaigns, peaceful struggle and civil resistance
- Members: 120
- Website: www.alharak.org

The Syrian Nonviolence Movement is a non-governmental organization formed in 2011 by a group of Syrian activists. They believe in peaceful struggle and civil resistance as a way to achieve social, cultural and political change in the Syrian state and society.

The organization aims to spread awareness about how change should happen in society with no violence and through non-violence tactics.

== Projects ==
=== Dignity Strike ===
Syrian Nonviolence Movement has conducted several grassroots initiatives since the beginning of the Syrian revolution, such as karamah Strike (known as "Dignity Strike in Syria")

=== Freedom Days ===
The group gathered other non-violence groups under an umbrella called "Freedom Days" which organized and planned many non-violent activities and projects during the Syrian Revolution

=== Non-violence Map ===
The Syrian Nonviolence Movement produced a map of nonviolence activities during the Syrian Civil War. The interactive map visualizes many civil initiatives that emerged during the civil war
