= Environmental policy in Lebanon =

Environmental policy in Lebanon falls within the jurisdiction of the Ministry of Environment (MOE), established in 1992. The MOE is solely responsible for producing environmental laws at the national level. Lebanon has ratified several international agreements since 1992. It ratified the United Nations Framework Convention on Climate Change (UNFCCC), and in 2006 ratified the Kyoto Protocol. In keeping with its agreements with the United Nations, Lebanon prepares regular communications for the UNFCCC addressing the state of the country's environment.

In evaluating the state of Lebanon's environment, the World Bank declared that Lebanon is still in the early stages of its transition to environmental sustainability. Improper waste disposal and biodiversity loss continue to be intractable issues.

== Power delegation and policy jurisdiction ==
=== Government responsibilities ===
Lebanon follows a parliamentary system of government, enjoying a President, Prime Minister, and cabinet chosen through an electoral process. Lebanon's cabinet includes the Offices of the President, Head of Parliament, and Prime Minister, as well as 23 government ministries whose authority are derived from the government's executive branch. This system grants each ministry responsibility for setting laws and regulations relevant to their areas of jurisdiction, and tasks them with overseeing the implementation of proposed laws. Environmental policy planning falls in the jurisdiction of the Ministry of Environment (MOE). The MOE addresses climate change and sustainability in its policy planning, and is solely responsible for producing environmental laws at the national level.

The Ministry of Environment collaborates with local and national authorities when implementing these laws, however. The Ministries of Public Health, Hydraulic and Electrical Resources, and Council for Development and Reconstruction regularly work with the MOE to ensure public follow-through for all existing regulations. Additionally, overlapping jurisdiction on environmental issues requires the MOE to cooperate at some level with all Lebanese government agencies. An example of this collaboration occurs during policy planning directed at Lebanon's industrial sector. While the Ministry of Industry is responsible for registering and licensing industrial establishments, the Ministry of Environment is tasked with approving all establishments. The MOE also is responsible for monitoring pollution levels and launching awareness campaigns. Broad issues such as industrial development require collaboration between multiple government branches, in order for comprehensive policy measures to be reached.

=== Role of NGOs ===
Environmental NGOs have been operating in Lebanon since the early 1970s, predating the establishment of the Ministry of Environment by approximately two decades. However, by 1975, the country entered into civil war, and remained in conflict until 1990, causing growth in the environmental sector to slow. During the early 1980s, NGO activities were largely theoretical, consisting of research and case studies on local ecosystems. Meanwhile, conservationist efforts were minimal, as the war rendered public concern for the environment a luxury. Only in the late 1980s, as fighting decreased and environmental awareness began to reemerge, did the development of NGOs resume. By 1990, roughly 40 institutions existed throughout Lebanon that dealt with environmental issues, according to UN records.

Because of the disruptive effects of the civil war, many of the oldest NGOs still in existence today were founded during the 1980s. These include the Committee of Cedar Forest Friends (CFC), and the Society for the Protection of Nature in Lebanon (SPNL), founded in 1985 and 1986 respectively. In 1994, eight NGOs, among these the CFC and SPNL, established the Lebanese Environment Forum, and became its member organizations. The Lebanese Environment Forum (LEF) comprises 46 local organizations and coordinates existing environmental NGOs in Lebanon, as well as encouraging the establishment of new NGOs. LEF currently undertakes projects such as reforestation, establishment of sanctuaries, and awareness campaigns for protecting the environment. Additionally, member organizations hold monthly coordination meetings with the Ministry of Environment, and partner with the government in conducting environmental workshops and seminars.

Both national and international NGOs assist the executive branch of the Lebanese government in implementing environmental policies. On a national scale, more than fifty environment-based NGOs cooperate with the MOE, including the Society for the Protection of Nature in Lebanon, and the Green Line Association. International non-governmental organizations, particularly UN-based establishments, fund environmental initiatives undertaken by the MOE, and monitor national adherence to international law.

=== Significant Lebanese NGOs ===
National NGOS

NGO	Objectives
Al-Shouf Cedar Society (ACS)	Manage the Al-Shouf Cedar Nature Reserve; perform regular research and monitoring projects; encourage ecotourism and rural development programs.
Association for Forest Development and Conservation (AFDC)	Encourage community-based conservation methods; foster capacity building and public awareness in fields related to the environment; lobby for changes in environmental policy.
Association for the Protection of Jabal Moussa (APJM)	Managing body of Jabal Moussa UNESCO Biosphere Reserve. Their mission is to conserve and highlight the unique natural and cultural heritage of Jabal Moussa Biosphere Reserve, empower local communities to achieve collectively their own sustainable socio-economic development, and build effective partnerships with local and international stakeholders.
Committee of Cedar Forest Friends (CFC)	Lobby for government legislation that insists on the protection and conservation of the cedar forests.
Green Line Association	Promote environmental awareness; document environmental threats "in order to better confront them."
Society for the Protection of Nature in Lebanon (SPNL)	Protect and conserve nature, birds and biodiversity in Lebanon; promote sustainable use of resources among citizens by reviving the concept of Al Hima.

International NGOs

NGO	Responsibilities
United Nations Environment Programme (UNEP)	Assess global, regional and national environmental conditions and trends; develop and strengthen mitigation tools for wise management of the environment.
International Union for Conservation of Nature (IUCN)	Conduct conservation projects worldwide both on national and local levels; encourage and facilitate scientific research; influence international environmental laws and policies with the collective strength of over 1,200 member organizations.
American Friends of the Lebanon Mountain Trail (AFLMT)	Strengthen ties between the 80 communities living along the LMT and Americans, both of Lebanese- and non-Lebanese descent.

== Issues ==
Several high-priority topics have been identified by international studies addressing the state of Lebanon's environment. A 1997 policy assessment conducted by USAID singles hazardous and toxic waste disposal, poor urban air quality, degradation of coastal zones, and soil erosion as the most pressing environmental issues facing Lebanon. In evaluating the state of Lebanon's environment two decades later, the World Bank has declared that, “Lebanon is still at an early stage of its transition to environmental sustainability.” Improper waste disposal continues to be an issue in Lebanon, with more than 700 open dumps used by municipalities. Recent forest fires have exacerbated the existing reduction of forest coverage, consequently contributing to biodiversity loss. Taking these issues into account, the Ministry of Environment has identified several sectors in which to launch necessary climate change legislation. These include Lebanon's energy, transport, agriculture, and waste and wastewater subdivisions.

== Significant policies and agreements ==
Lebanon has ratified several international agreements since the formation of the Ministry of Environment in 1992. In December 1994, Lebanon ratified the United Nations Framework Convention on Climate Change (UNFCCC), for example, and in November 2006 Lebanon acceded to the Kyoto Protocol. In keeping with its agreements with the United Nations, Lebanon has prepared regular communications for the UNFCCC addressing the state of the country's environment. The first of these communications was published in 1995, followed by a second communication in 2011. A third communication is due by the end of 2015.
