= Dignity Strike in Syria =

Nonviolent protest

The five-petal jasmine was chosen to be the symbol of the Dignity Strike and became one of the widespread symbols of the Syrian Civil War

Strike for Dignity (Arabic: إضراب الكرامة, the Karamah Strike, transliterated: Idrab Al-Karameh) was a nationwide general strike organised by groups in the Syrian Civil War in December 2011 as a nonviolent expression of dissent against the government of Bashar al-Assad during the Syrian civil war. It is significant as one of the very few strikes during the four decades of Ba'ath Party rule in Syria.

== History ==
=== Background ===
The Syrian civil war, is an ongoing armed conflict in Syria between forces loyal to the Syrian Ba'ath Party government and those seeking to oust it. A nonviolent demonstration of approximately 150 participants emerged in Damascus' Hamidiya Market area on 15 March 2011; then on Friday, 18 March 2011, four Syrian cities (Dara, Banyas, Homs, and Damascus) saw what appear to be much larger protest crowds take to the streets. Three young men protesting in the city of Dara were allegedly shot and killed on 18 March 2011 by government military forces sent to repress the nonviolent demonstrations, triggering more protests in the ensuing days. Grassroots demonstrations, predominantly nonviolent, grew into a nationwide movement by April 2011. These demonstrations in Syria occurred in the context of the wider Middle Eastern protest movement known as the Arab Spring. Protesters' discourse demanded freedom and dignity; an end to martial law (in place since March, 1963); the release of prisoners of conscience; and the resignation of President Bashar al-Assad, whose family has held the presidency in Syria since 1971; as well as the end to over four decades of Ba'ath Party rule.

=== Strike for Dignity ===
The Syrian Nonviolence Movement along with civil resistance groups in Syria such as the Local Coordination Committees of Syria, working together under an umbrella group called Freedom Days Syria, called for a general strike on 11 December 2011 to express dissent against the Syrian government in a nonviolent way. The organisers of the strike claimed that the strike would contribute to weakening the government and could lead eventually to its fall. The strike had six different stages which progressed toward widespread, organized civil disobedience. Activities included sit-ins and closure of shops and universities, followed by the shutdown of transportation networks and a general public sector strike. Groups in the uprising used social media to spreads the call for the strike, as well as using SMS, voice calls, and emails. Many news channels announced the details of the strikes beforehand. The opposition called the Friday of 9 December 2011 that preceded the strike as Friday of the Dignity Strike.

=== Reactions and responses ===
==== From the Syrian government ====
The Syrian government reportedly responded to the strike by deploying elements of its repressive apparatus and by using violence. In some cities, the government reportedly deployed tanks mounted with machine guns to try to put an end to the general strike. Security forces reportedly told striking shopkeepers to open up their stores or they would be smashed. There are reports that government troops burned down at least 178 stores and shops in the city of Daraa to punish civilians who closed their stores and shops for the strike. Attacks by security forces on participating stores triggered clashes with the Free Syrian army in at least one area. Some amateur footage on social media networks showed security forces breaking the locks of stores participating in the strike. Government security forces seized one private school in Damascus which supported the strike, ousting the school founder as well as the headmistress, and appointing a government official from the Ministry of Education to supervise the school and see that it stayed open. It was reported that security forces also burned an Aleppo factory that was participating in the strike. The Syrian Arab News Agency, run by the Syrian state, blamed the strike on "provocative parties" acting "within the framework of the political and economic campaign launched by powers hostile to Syria, which aim to undermine economic and social activities in the country and to disable public life".

==== From groups involved in the dissent movement ====
The Local Coordination Committees of Syria documented more than 600 points that participated in the Strike across Syria. The expatriated opposition body called the Syrian National Council said in a statement that the "Dignity Strike" launched that Sunday was widely observed in 12 provinces across Syria "against all expectations." "Nadi al-Tufula" (Club Childhood), a small private elementary school in Damascus founded by women with a history of teaching nonviolence, tried to join the strike. School staff made the decision public by posting notice on the school entrance indicating that the school would be closed in observance of the strike. The Syrian Observatory for Human Rights announced that the strike was being "very widely observed" in southern Syria's Daraa province, Idlib, Homs area and the Damascus countryside.

=== Dignity Disobedience ===
The Dignity Strike evolved to become the Dignity Disobedience
