= Visa requirements for Lebanese citizens =

Administrative entry restrictions

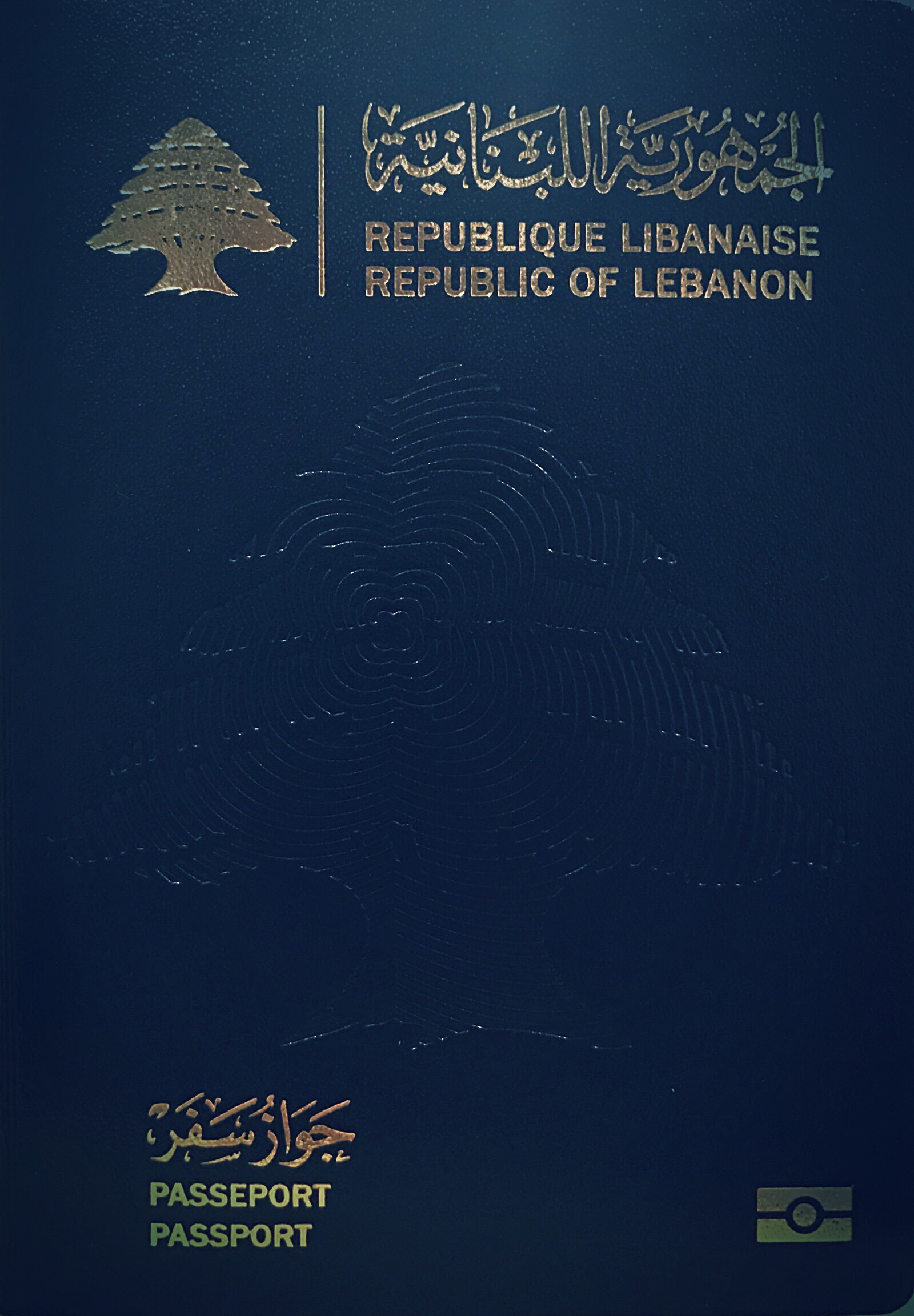
The front cover of the Lebanese biometric passport

Visa requirements for citizens of the Republic of Lebanon are administrative entry restrictions by the authorities of other sovereign countries and territories placed on citizens of the Republic of Lebanon.

As of 2026, Lebanese citizens had visa-free or visa on arrival access to 43 countries and territories, ranking the Lebanese passport 88th in the world according to the Henley Passport Index.

Citizens of the Republic of Lebanon do not need a passport when travelling to Iraq, they may use just their domestic national identification cards called in Arabic: بطاقة الهوية (biṭāqat al-hawiya) and in French: carte nationale d'identité.

== Visa requirements map ==
Visa requirements for Lebanese citizens Lebanon Visa Free Visa not required (conditional) Visa on arrival eVisa Visa available both on arrival or online Visa required

== Visa requirements ==
General visa requirements of fully internationally recognized sovereign countries and territories towards citizens of the Republic of Lebanon:

Country	Visa requirement	Allowed stay	Notes (excluding departure fees)
Afghanistan	eVisa	30 days	e-Visa : Visitors must arrive at Kabul International (KBL).
Albania	eVisa	90 days	Visa not required for a maximum stay of 90 days within 180 days for passengers of Albanian origin.; Visa not required for a maximum stay of 90 days within 180 days for valid visa holders or residents of the European Union member states, the United Kingdom and the United States.
Algeria	Visa required		Persons may be denied entry if entering with a passport containing visas or stamps issued by Israel.; Visitors on tours organized to some southern regions by an approved travel agency may obtain a visa on arrival for up to 30 days.
Andorra	Visa required		Multiple-entry Schengen visa is required to enter and exit Andorra.
Angola	eVisa	30 days	Visa not required for personnel of oil companies established in Angola, provided they present a photocopy of their passport, 4 photos, and a copy of a visa application which should be submitted by the oil company at least 2 weeks prior to arrival.; International Certificate of Vaccination is required.
Antigua and Barbuda	eVisa		Obtainable online.; Printed visa authorization must be presented at the time of travel.; Visa not required for a maximum stay of 30 days for valid visa holders or residents of the Canada, European Union member states, the United Kingdom, and the United States; Visa waiver fee applies for valid visa holders or residents of the United States.; Departure tax applies.
Argentina	Visa required		All visitors are fingerprinted and photographed upon entry.
Armenia	eVisa / Visa on arrival	120 days	Valid for 120 days within 1 year.; Obtainable online.; Printed visa authorization must be presented at the time of travel.
Australia	Online Visa required		May Apply Online. (Online Visitor e600 visa).; Printed visa authorization must be presented at the time of travel.; Passengers traveling on domestic sectors of international flights within Australia must hold passports, or passport replacing documents accepted by Australia.; Valid Australian visas in a full or expired Lebanese passports are accepted if accompanied by a new Lebanese passport. Verification by airlines using Australia's Advanced Passenger Processing (APP) System will require the details of the travel document that contains the Australian visa.; Passengers who have a criminal conviction record may be refused entry or transit.
Austria	Visa required		
Azerbaijan	Visa required		
Bahamas	eVisa	90 days	The visa can be obtained through British diplomatic missions.
Bahrain	eVisa	14 days	e-Visa or Visa on Arrival is Obtainable ONLY for holders of a valid visit visa to UAE, UK, USA, KSA (excluding Hajj & Umrah visa), Schengen or USA Green Card.; Printed visa authorization must be presented at the time of travel.; Visa not required for a maximum stay of 1 day for valid visa holders or residents of Saudi Arabia providing hey continue their journey by land using the Causeway to Saudi Arabia.; Visa on arrival for holders of Diplomatic, Service, and Official passports; Multiple-entry Visa on arrival for a maximum stay of 3 months within 6 months for a maximum stay of 2 weeks per visit for residents of the GCC member states.
Bangladesh	Visa required		Visa on arrival for passengers of Bangladeshi origin.; Visa on arrival for spouses and children of passengers of Bangladeshi origin provided they present return/onward tickets for a maximum stay of 30 days.; Visa on arrival for holders of a confirmation letter issued by the Bangladesh Board of Investment (BOI) containing a BOI registration number and traveling on business provided they present return/onward tickets. The accredited inviting organization must notify the Immigration authorities prior to arrival.; Extensions of stay is possible for a fee.; Departure tax applies.
Barbados	Visa not required	90 days	
Belarus	Visa required		Visa not required for a maximum stay of 10 days at Brest (BQT), Augustów Canal, or Grodno (GNA) provided holding a confirmation issued by a travel agency.; Visa not required for a maximum stay of 5 days for valid visa holders or residents of the European Union member states. Must arrive via Minsk International Airport.; Visa not required for passengers visiting to Belovezhskaya Pushcha National Park for up to 3 days.; Visa on arrival at the Minsk International Airport if the support documents were submitted to the Consular Division at Minsk (not later than 3 (for short-term visas) or 5 working days (for long-term visas) the expected date of arrival.; Visa on arrival at the Minsk International Airport for holders of an invitation letter issued by a Belarusian tourist company or a medical or health organization. The letter must be written on official headed paper with the passenger's name, passport details, purpose, and duration of stay. The letter must also have the original signature and official seal of the head of the inviting organization.; Passengers are required to have a health insurance which can be purchased on arrival at the Minsk International Airport.; Transiting without a visa is not allowed under any circumstance.; Registration with the local police within 7 days of arrival is mandatory.
Belgium	Visa required		
Belize	Visa required		Visa not required for a maximum stay of 90 days within 180 days for valid visa holders or residents of the European Union member states or the United States.; Passengers must hold at least 50 USD a day and documents required for their next destination.; Departure tax applies.
Benin	eVisa	30 days	Printed visa authorization must be presented at the time of travel.; Must have an international vaccination certificate.; Three types of electronic visa are offered: the e-Visa valid for 30 days for a single entry (50 EUR), the e-Visa valid for 30 days for several (multiple) entries (75 EUR), and the e-Visa valid for 90 days to make several (multiple) entries (100 EUR).
Bhutan	eVisa	90 days	The Sustainable Development Fee (SDF) of 200 USD per person, per night for almost all visitors to Bhutan. Additionally, if payment is made in US dollars from September 1, 2023 to August 31, 2027, the SDF is 100 USD.
Bolivia	Online Visa	30 days	Extensions of stay is possible for a maximum stay of 5 months for a fee.; Departure tax applies.
Bosnia and Herzegovina	Visa required		Visa not required for a maximum stay of 90 days within 6 months for valid visa holders or residents of the European Union member states and the United States.; Registration with the local police within 24 hours of arrival is mandatory.
Botswana	eVisa	3 months	
Brazil	Visa required		Visa is not required for a maximum stay of 3 months within 6 months for holders of Diplomatic, Service, and Official passports; Eligible to apply for three-year visas valid for tourism and business trips and may use them whenever they visit Brazil within that period.; Visa is not required for a maximum stay of 3 months within 6 months for holders of a VIPER visa issued by Brazil
Brunei	Visa required		All visitors are fingerprinted upon entry.; Immigration offences, such as visa overstaying, are punishable by jail, fines, and caning.
Bulgaria	Visa required		
Burkina Faso	eVisa	90 days	Visa on arrival for holders of Diplomatic, Service, and Official passports.; Visa on arrival for holders of Interpol passports travelling on duty provided they present one passport photo. BCN INTERPOL in Burkina Faso must be informed before arrival.; International Certificate of Vaccination is required.
Burundi	Online Visa / Visa on arrival	1 month	Visa on arrival for a maximum stay of 1 month for holders of an "Entry Authorization" letter issued by the authorities of Burundi before departure.; All visitors are fingerprinted upon entry.
Cambodia	eVisa / Visa on arrival	30 days	Valid for 30 days per trip.; Extensions of stay is possible up to a maximum stay of 12 months for a fee.; Passengers not permitted to make day trips that arrive and depart on the same day, except when arriving and departing at Phnom Penh (PNH) airport or hold a multiple-entry business visa.; Printed visa authorization must be presented at the time of travel.; Visa on arrival for passengers who were born in Cambodia.; All visitors are fingerprinted upon entry and exit.
Cameroon	eVisa		Visa not required for holders of an ID card for International Organization.; Visa on arrival to holders of a confirmation that a visa has been approved before departure and issued by "Le Delegue General de la Surete".; International Certificate of Vaccination is required.
Canada	Visa required		Visa not required for holders of a Green Card issued by the United States unless deemed inadmissible.; Transit Visa is required except for holders of a B or C visa issued by Switzerland when traveling to the United States flying with Air Canada.; Visa not required for holders of a valid student or employment authorization and/or holders of a Parapan Identity and Accreditation Card (PIAC).; Obtainable online for visitor, study, work, medical, and permanent residence visas. Printed visa authorization must be presented at the time of travel.; Passengers who have a criminal conviction record may be refused entry or transit.
Cape Verde	Visa required		
Central African Republic	Visa required		Passengers over the age of 15 not presenting return or onward tickets must pay a deposit to a bank or the transporting airlines between 15,000 XAF AND 250,000 XAF depending on the country of commencement of the journey.; International Certificate of Vaccination is required.
Chad	eVisa	90 days	Visa on arrival for holders of an Entry Authorization Letter issued by Chad before departure.; International Certificate of Vaccination is required.; Registration with the local police within 72 hours of arrival is mandatory.
Chile	Visa required		Visa not required for a maximum stay of 3 months within 6 months for holders of Diplomatic, Service, and Official passports.; Visa on arrival for holders of an Entry Authorization Letter issued by the Ministry of Foreign Affairs.
China	Visa required		Visa is not required for a maximum stay of 6 days for passengers traveling for tourism purposes in a group organized by a Chinese international tour operator or registered travel agency provided they are arriving from Hong Kong or Macao to take a trip to the Zhujiang Delta in Guangdong province or arriving or departing at or to Dongguan (DGM), Guangzhou(CAN), Huizhou (HUZ), Shantou (SWA), Shenzhen (SZX) or Zhuhai (ZUH).; Visa is not required for a maximum stay of 30 days for holders of a Port Visa notification.; Visa on arrival at Beijing (PEK) for a maximum stay of 3 months for holders of a confirmation that a visa has been approved before departure. The airlines must fax all documents to the station managed prior to arrival and the passenger must have a confirmation from the Immigration authorities that the visa will be issued on arrival, two passport photos, a passport that contains at least 1 blank visa page, and an invitation letter issued by the Chinese Authorities or by a sponsor approved by the Chinese authorities who must meet the passenger on arrival.; Visa on arrival at Chendgu (CTU), Fuzhou (FOC), Shanghai ( (Hongqiao (SHA) Pudong (PVG), or Xiamen (XMN) for a maximum stay of 1 month holders of a confirmation that a visa has been approved before departure provided they present a letter of invitation issued by the immigration authorities that the visa will be issued on arrival, two passport photos, a confirmed return or onward ticket, a passport that contains at least one blank visa page, and a sponsor approved by the Chinese authorities is there to meet the passenger on arrival.; All visitors between the ages of 14 and 70 are fingerprinted upon entry and exit.; Registration with the local police within 24 hours of arrival is mandatory.
Colombia	Online Visa	90 days	Printed visa authorization must be presented at the time of travel.; Visa not required for a maximum stay of 3 months within 6 months for holders of Diplomatic, Service, and Official passports.
Comoros	Visa on arrival	45 days	Valid for 45 days per trip.
Republic of the Congo	Visa required		Visa not required for holders of a V.I.P invitation letter.; Visa on arrival for those participating in United Nations meetings.; Visa on arrival for holders of a special entry authorization can obtain a visa on arrival. The entry authorization must be signed by the Minister of Interior and Decentralization and by the Director General of Territorial.; Passengers must hold an invitation letter or hotel reservation in addition to the visa.; International Certificate of Vaccination is required.
Democratic Republic of the Congo	eVisa	7 days	Visa on arrival for passengers of Democratic Republic of Congo origin.; Visa on arrival for a maximum stay of 7 days for holders of a letter ("visa volant") issued by the Ministry of Interior and Security.; Passengers not holding visas issued in their country of residence will be refused entry (unless there is no embassy of the Democratic Republic of the Congo in their country of residence).; Registration with the local police upon arrival is mandatory.; International Certificate of Vaccination is required.
Costa Rica	Visa required		Visa not required for a maximum stay of 30 days for valid visa holders or residents of Canada.; Visa not required for a maximum stay of 30 days for valid multiple-entry visa holders or residents of Japan or the United States used at least once and valid for at least 6 months beyond the period of intended stay.; Costa Rican visas should be used within 60 days after the date of issuance.
Côte d'Ivoire	eVisa	3 months	Obtainable online.; Printed visa authorization must be presented at the time of travel.; Electronic Visa holders must arrive at Port Bouet Airport.; Visa on arrival for holders of an approved pre-enrolment and a registration receipt before departure.; Visa on arrival for holders of an invitation letter issued by the authorities of Côte d'Ivoire.; International Certificate of Vaccination is required.
Croatia	Visa required		Visa not required for a maximum stay of 90 days within 180 days for valid visa holders or residents of the European Union member states.; Registration with the local police within 24 hours of arrival is mandatory.
Cuba	eVisa	90 days	Visa not required for a maximum stay of 3 months within 6 months for holders of Diplomatic, Service, and Official passports.
Cyprus	Visa required		Visa not required for a maximum stay of 90 days within 180 days for holders of Diplomatic, Service, and Official passports.; Visa not required for a maximum stay of 90 days within 180 days for valid visa holders or residents of the European Union member states.
Czech Republic	Visa required		
Denmark	Visa required		
Djibouti	eVisa / Visa on arrival	90 days	Visas can be obtained online or upon arrival.; Printed visa authorization must be presented at the time of travel.; A transit visa (from 1 to 14 days) costs $12 and a short stay visa (from 15 to 90 days) will cost $23.; e-Visa is issued only for tourism or commerce purposes.; Must hold a return/onward ticket.; Transit visa is not required if you do not leave the airport.; Djibouti's government recommends that travelers apply for an eVisa.; According to Timatic, nationals of any country holding any type of valid passport may obtain a visa on arrival. The final decision is determined by the airline.; Holders of an e-Visa can enter Djibouti through Ambouli International Airport or any other border crossing.
Dominica	Visa not required	21 days	Valid for 21 days within 180 days.; Visa not required for a maximum stay of 6 months for valid visa holders or residents of Canada, the European Union member states, the United Kingdom, or the United States.; Visitors must complete a landing card 3 days before departure.; Extensions of stay is possible up to a maximum stay of 3 months within 6 months for a fee.; All visitors are fingerprinted upon entry
Dominican Republic	Visa required		Visa not required for passengers who were born in the Dominican Republic; Visa not required for a maximum stay of 90 days within 180 days for valid visa holders or residents of Canada, the United Kingdom, the European Union member states, or the United States
Ecuador	Visa not required	90 days	Valid for 90 days within 180 days.
Egypt	Visa not required (conditional)	90 days	Valid for 90 days within 180 days.; Visa not required if arriving at Borg El Arab Airport in Alexandria, Hurghada Airport or Sharm El Sheikh Airport for South Sinai resorts on a charter flight.; Visa not required if travelling as part of a tourist group that consists of at least 10 persons who hold a return ticket, booked accommodation and a signed guarantee letter from a travel agency.; Visa not required for citizens under the age of 16 and over the age of 50.; Visa not required for sons and daughters of citizens of Egypt.
El Salvador	eVisa	90 days	
Equatorial Guinea	eVisa		International Certificate of Vaccination is required.
Eritrea	Visa required		Visa not required for minors under 18 years of age accompanied by parents, provided they present an Eritrean National ID Card.; Visa on arrival for holders of a printed confirmation that a visa has been approved before departure provided the sponsor in Eritrea submits the request to the Eritrean Immigration Authority 48 hours before arrival and the passenger holds 1 passport photo.; Departure tax applies.
Estonia	Visa required		
Eswatini	Visa required		
Ethiopia	eVisa / Visa on arrival	Up to 90 days	Printed visa authorization must be presented at the time of travel.; e-Visa holders must arrive at Addis Ababa Bole International Airport.; Visa on arrival is obtainable only at Addis Ababa Bole International Airport.; Visa on arrival for holders of diplomatic, service, and official passports.; Visa on arrival at Addis Ababa Bole International Airport if attending meetings, seminars, or workshops organized by the African Union, provided they present an invitation letter stating the purpose of travel.; Visa on arrival at Addis Ababa Bole International Airport, provided they present an invitation letter issued to participants of the UNECA (United Nations Economic Commission for Africa) conferences and meetings held at the U.N conference centre in Addis Ababa.; All visitors are fingerprinted upon entry.
Fiji	Online Visa		
Finland	Visa required		
France	Visa required		
Gabon	eVisa	90 days	Printed visa authorization must be presented at the time of travel.; Passengers must hold an "autorisation d'entrée au Gabon" in addition to a visa.; e-Visa holders must arrive at Leon Mba International Airport in Libreville.; Visa on arrival for holders of an entry authorization issued by the Immigration in Gabon before departure.; International Certificate of Vaccination is required.
Gambia	Visa required		Visa not required for if travelling for tourism purposes on a charter flight.; International Certificate of Vaccination is required.
Georgia	Visa not required	1 year	Medical insurance for the full duration of the intended stay is mandatory.
Germany	Visa required		
Ghana	eVisa	90 days	Visa not required for holders of a dual Nationality Card issued by Ghana.; Visa on arrival for passengers of Ghanaian origin and not holding a "Dual Nationality Card" and entering Ghana on a Lebanese passport provided they present a confirmation that a visa has been approved before departure and a copy of the visa-on-arrival approval issued at least 48 hours prior to traveling to Ghana by the Ghana Immigration Service. The approval must contain both traveler's passport and visa numbers and a copy of the bio-data and photo page of the applicant's passport.; Ghana has brought online the official portal that will be used for electronic visa applications starting May 25, 2026.; The processing time for the eVisa is 96 hours, costing $260 for a single entry and $468 for a multiple entry visa, making it one of the most expensive eVisas. Fees are higher for faster processing.; All visitors are fingerprinted upon entry.; International Certificate of Vaccination is required.
Greece	Visa required		
Grenada	Visa required		
Guatemala	Visa required		Departure tax applies.
Guinea	eVisa	90 days	Obtainable online for 80 USD.; Printed visa authorization must be presented at the time of travel.; International Certificate of Vaccination is required.
Guinea-Bissau	Visa on arrival	90 days	
Guyana	eVisa		Visa not required for a maximum stay of 3 months within 6 months for holders of Diplomatic, Service, and Official passports.; Visa not required for passengers who are under 17 years of age and were born in Guyana.
Haiti	Visa not required	3 months	Valid for 3 months within 6 months.; Extensions of stay is possible for a fee.
Honduras	Visa required		Departure tax applies.
Hungary	Visa required		Visa not required for 90 days within 180 days inside Schengen Area for holders of Diplomatic, Service, and Official passports.
Iceland	Visa required		
India	Visa required		Visa not required for holders of a Person of Indian Origin. (PIO) Card; Visa not required for holders of an Overseas Citizen of India card or booklet.; Passengers arriving from Guinea, Liberia, Mali and Sierra Leone at Bangalore (BLR), Chennai (MAA), Cochin (COK), Delhi (DEL), Hyderabad (HYD), Kolkata (CCU) or Mumbai (BOM) are subject to enhanced passenger screening and medical checks.; Holders of visas that specifically state the city or airport of entry must enter India at that specified city or airport.; All visitors are fingerprinted upon entry.
Indonesia	eVisa	60 days	
Iran	Visa not required	15 days	On May 18, 2026, the Iranian Embassy in Lebanon announced on X that Lebanese citizens will not require a visa to enter Iran for 15 days for religious and touristic purposes.
Iraq	Visa not required	30 days	Nationals of Lebanon do not require a visa to enter Iraq and are allowed a maximum stay of 30 days.
Ireland	Visa required		
Israel	Visa required		Confirmation from the Israeli Foreign Ministry is required before a visa is issued.; Any person "who knowingly issues a public call for boycotting Israel" will be refused entry.; Generally not allowed to enter
Italy	Visa required		
Jamaica	Visa required		Departure tax applies.
Japan	Visa required		All visitors are fingerprinted upon entry.; Holders of Lebanese passports who reside in the following 11 countries (Brazil, Cambodia, Canada, Mongolia, Saudi Arabia, Singapore, South Africa, Taiwan, United Arab Emirates, United Kingdom, and the United States) can apply and obtain an electronic visa (e-Visa). The duration of stay for these countries is up to 90 days.
Jordan	Visa not required	3 months	Valid for 3 months within 6 months.; The visa-free facility is not applicable for holders of emergency or temporary passports thus they should obtain a visa beforehand.; Iris scan taken upon entry and departure.
Kazakhstan	Visa required		Kazakhstan e-Visa; E-Visa can be issued only if there is a valid invitation from the Kazakh side.; To apply for an e-Visa, you need an invitation number received from the inviting Kazakh side.; The issued electronic visa must be printed out for presentation at the state border crossing and on the territory of the Republic of Kazakhstan.; E-Visa gives the right to enter / exit the Republic of Kazakhstan only through the international airports of Astana and Almaty.; E-Visas are not issued to foreigners with whom children travel together.; Visa on arrival at Almaty (ALA) and Nur-Sultan (TSE) Airports for those arriving from a country without a Kazakh representation and are holding a confirmation from the Ministry of Foreign Affairs that a visa has been approved before departure.; Printed visa authorization must be presented at the time of travel.
Kenya	Electronic Travel Authorisation	90 days	Applications can be submitted up to 90 days prior to travel and must be submitted at least 3 days in advance.; eTA fee is 32.50 USD.; Proof of reservation at the hotel where visitors plan to stay is required (if staying with friends, an invitation letter is also acceptable).; Yellow fever vaccination certificate is required if coming from endemic countries.
Kiribati	Visa required		
North Korea	Visa required		Passengers traveling for tourism purposes must hold an authorization to travel issued by a travel company in North Korea
South Korea	Visa required		Printed visa authorization and an Electronic Visa Issuance Confirmation issued by the Ministry of Justice must be presented at the time of travel.; Visa not required if arriving at and departing from Jeju (CJU) Airport.; Visa not required for passengers who have previously entered Korea (Rep.) at least 4 times within the last 2 years or at least 10 visits in total.; Visa Exemption for 30 days for those who are in transit through South Korea, provided they present a physical visa or a residence permit issued by the following countries and are arriving at South Korea from one of these countries and continuing to a third country, or arriving from a third country and continuing to one of these countries.; Australia^{1}; Canada; European Union; New Zealand; United States; _{1 - Holders of e-Visas or e-resident permits are only permitted visa-free entry if they depart from Australia.}: All visitors are fingerprinted upon entry.
Kuwait	Visa required		Visa not required for a maximum stay of 1 month for holders of a confirmation that a visa has been approved before departure provided they are traveling for tourism purposes and having a sponsor in Kuwait who must hold the original visa.; Visa on arrival for a maximum stay of 3 months within 6 months for residents of the GCC member states.; Visa on arrival for holders of confirmation from the transporting carrier and are traveling for tourism purposes for a maximum stay of 1 month.; Holders of a resident visa or a work permit traveling to Kuwait for the first time are required to hold an original Criminal Clearance Certificate authenticated by a Kuwait diplomatic mission in their country of residence.
Kyrgyzstan	eVisa	60 days	Printed visa authorization must be presented at the time of travel.; e-Visa holders must arrive via Manas International Airport or Osh Airport or through land crossings with China (at Irkeshtam and Torugart), Kazakhstan (at Ak-jol, Ak-Tilek, Chaldybar, Chon-Kapka), Tajikistan (at Bor-Dobo, Kulundu, Kyzyl-Bel) and Uzbekistan (at Dostuk).
Laos	Visa required		
Latvia	Visa required		
Lesotho	Visa required		
Liberia	e-VOA	3 months	
Libya	eVisa	30 days	
Liechtenstein	Visa required		
Lithuania	Visa required		
Luxembourg	Visa required		
Madagascar	Online Visa / Visa on arrival	90 days	For stays of 61 to 90 days, the visa fee is 59 USD.; Printed visa authorization must be presented at the time of travel.; Extensions of stay for a maximum stay of 4 months is possible for a fee.
Malawi	eVisa	30 days	Printed visa authorization must be presented at the time of travel.; The Travel document should be valid for 180 days and bear at least 2 blank pages.
Malaysia	Visa not required	90 days	Valid for 90 days within 180 days.; Extensions of stay is possible twice, 30 days each, for a fee.; Visa on arrival for students attending a university or college in Malaysia for the duration of their study period provided they hold all documentation confirming placement and met by a representative.; All visitors are fingerprinted upon entry and exit.; Immigration offences, such as visa overstaying, are punishable by jail, fines, and caning.; The electronic Malaysia Digital Arrival Card must be submitted within three days before the date of arrival in Malaysia.
Maldives	Free visa on arrival	30 days	Valid for 30 days per trip.; Extensions of stay is possible up to a maximum stay of 60 days for a fee.
Mali	Visa required		Visa on arrival for holders of Diplomatic, Service, and Official passports.; Letter of invitation is required.; International Certificate of Vaccination is required.
Malta	Visa required		Visa not required except for 90 days within 180 days inside Schengen Area for holders of Diplomatic, Service, and Official passports.
Marshall Islands	Visa on arrival	90 days	
Mauritania	eVisa	30 days	
Mauritius	Visa on arrival	60 days	Valid for 60 days within 120 days for business purposes and 60 days within 180 days for tourism purposes.; Extensions of stay is possible for a fee.; An Entry permit or Residence Permit is required for those holding Work permits.
Mexico	Visa required		Visa not required for a maximum stay of 180 days within 1 year for valid visa holders or residents of Canada, the European Union member states, Japan, the United Kingdom or the United States.
Micronesia	Visa not required	30 days	Valid for 30 days within 180 days.; Departure tax applies.
Moldova	Visa required		Citizens holding a residence permit or a valid visa issued by one of the member states of the European Union or one of the parties to the Schengen Agreement can apply for an electronic visa.
Monaco	Visa required		
Mongolia	Visa required		Registration with the local police within 30 days of arrival is mandatory.
Montenegro	Visa required		Visa not required for a maximum stay of 30 days for valid visa holders or residents of the European Union member states,Canada, Japan, New Zealand, the United Kingdom or the United States.; Registration with the local police within 24 hours of arrival is mandatory.
Morocco	Visa required		Visa not required for children under 17 years of age having a Moroccan parent and registered in that parent's passport.
Mozambique	eVisa / Visa on arrival	30 days	
Myanmar	Visa required		Overstaying is punishable by a fine of 3 USD per day which is paid upon departure.
Namibia	eVisa	3 months	
Nauru	Visa required		Visa not required for holders of an entry permit letter (visa letter) issued by Nauru.
Nepal	Online Visa / Visa on arrival	90 days	Valid for 90 days within 180 days.; Obtainable at Tribhuvan International Airport and certain land borders.; Printed visa authorization must be presented at the time of travel.; Extensions of stay is possible for a fee.; The visa-on-arrival (VoA) facility is not applicable for holders of temporary passports thus they should obtain a visa beforehand.
Netherlands	Visa required		
New Zealand	Visa required		Holders of an Australian Permanent Resident Visa or Resident Return Visa may be granted a New Zealand Resident Visa on arrival permitting indefinite stay (pursuant to the Trans-Tasman Travel Arrangement), subject to meeting character requirements and obtaining an Electronic Travel Authority prior to departure.
Nicaragua	eVisa	30 days	Passengers must obtain a tourist card which can be purchased on arrival for 2 USD.; Citizens of all other countries are eligible to obtain an electronic visa in advance.; The country launched the electronic visa portal in March 2026.
Niger	Visa required		Visa on arrival for a maximum stay of 30 days for holders of a letter ("visa volant").; International Certificate of Vaccination is required.
Nigeria	eVisa	30 days	Printed visa authorization must be presented at the time of travel.; Visa not required for former citizens of Nigeria, provided they present a valid passport issued by the Republic of Lebanon together with an expired Nigerian passport.; Visa not required for holders of a confirmation from the Immigration Authority Headquarters in Abuja that a visa has been approved before departure.
North Macedonia	Visa required		Visa is not required for a maximum stay of 15 days if holding a valid multiple entry visa of Canada, Schengen Area member state, United Kingdom and the United States inserted inside the passport, or residence permit of Schengen Area member state. The visa must be valid for at least 5 days beyond the period of intended stay in North Macedonia.; Passengers must hold an approval issued by the Ministry of Interior in addition to the visa.; Registration with the local police within 24 hours of arrival is mandatory.
Norway	Visa required		The form may be filled online and submitted to the diplomatic mission.
Oman	Visa not required / eVisa	14 days / 30 days	Visitors must have a confirmed hotel reservation, health insurance and a return ticket.; Holders of a visa or entrance stamp of the Emirate of Dubai that is valid for at least 21 days are visa exempt.; Holders of a visa for Qatar that is valid for travel to Oman and valid for at least one month are visa exempt when arriving directly from Qatar.; A visa is not required for stays of up to 14 days.; A single / multiple entry e-Visa is also available and is valid for 30 days.
Pakistan	eVisa	3 months	
Palau	Free visa on arrival	30 days	Valid for 30 days per trip.; Extensions of stay is possible up to a maximum stay of 90 days for a fee.
Panama	Visa required		Visa not required for those who were born in Panama.; Visa not required for holders of an ID card or Birth Certificate issued by Panama.; Visa not required for a maximum stay of 30 days for holders of a printed Travel Authorization.; Visa not required for a maximum stay of 30 days for valid visa holders or residents of Australia, Canada, the European Union member states, Japan, the United Kingdom, the United States, Singapore, or South Korea.; Passengers who have a criminal conviction record may be refused entry or transit.
Papua New Guinea	eVisa	60 days	Visitors may apply for a visa online under the "Tourist - Own Itinerary" category.
Paraguay	Visa required		Visa not required for a maximum stay of 3 months within 6 months for holders of Diplomatic, Service, and Official passports.; All visitors are fingerprinted upon entry.
Peru	Visa required		
Philippines	Visa required		Residents of the United Arab Emirates may obtain an eVisa through the official Philippine eVisa website. A valid Emirati residence visa must be shown upon an eVisa application.
Poland	Visa required		
Portugal	Visa required		
Qatar	eVisa		
Romania	Visa required		May Apply Online.; Printed visa authorization must be presented at the time of travel.
Russia	Visa required		Visa not required for a maximum stay of 72 hours when entering Russia through the ports of Anadyr, Kaliningrad, Korsakov, Novorossiysk, Sevastopol, Sochi, St.Petersburg, Vladivostok, and Vyborg by ferry.; Registration with the local police within 7 working days of arrival is mandatory.; The visa application form may be filled online and submitted to the diplomatic mission.
Rwanda	Visa not required	30 days	
Saint Kitts and Nevis	eVisa	30 days	Obtainable online.; Printed visa authorization must be presented at the time of travel.
Saint Lucia	Visa required		Visa not required for a maximum stay of 1 day for cruise ship passengers.
Saint Vincent and the Grenadines	Visa required		Visa not required for passengers of Vincentian origin provided they present a copy of their parent's birth certificates accompanied by their own birth certificate.
Samoa	Entry permit on arrival	90 days	Extensions of stay is possible up to a maximum stay of 1 month for a fee.
San Marino	Visa required		Visa not required for a maximum stay of 90 days within 180 days for valid visa holders or residents of the European Union member states.
São Tomé and Príncipe	eVisa	30 days	Printed visa authorization must be presented at the time of travel.; Visa not required for a maximum stay of 15 days for valid visa holders or residents of the European Union member states and the United States.; Visa not required for spouses and children of former citizens of São Tomé and Príncipe who is born in São Tomé and Príncipe.; International Certificate of Vaccination is required.
Saudi Arabia	Visa required		All visitors are fingerprinted upon entry.; Residents of GCC countries can apply for Saudi eVisas online and residents of the United States, United Kingdom and European Union may apply for a visa on arrival.
Senegal	Visa required		
Serbia	eVisa	90 days	90 days within any 180-day period. Transfers allowed.; Visa not required for holders of Diplomatic, Service, and Official passports.; Visa not required for a maximum stay of 90 days within 180 days for valid visa holders or residents of the European Union member states and the United States or valid visa holders of the United Kingdom.
Seychelles	Electronic Border System	3 months	Application can be submitted up to 30 days before travel.; Visitors must upload a reservation confirmation(s) for each visitor's location of stay in Seychelles.; Yellow fever vaccination certificate is required if coming from endemic countries.; Payment of the fee (EUR 10) by credit or debit card.; Valid for one journey only and it expires once exit the country.
Sierra Leone	eVisa / Visa on arrival	3 months / 30 days	Visa on arrival for holders of a confirmation from the immigration that a visa has been approved before departure.; International Certificate of Vaccination is required.
Singapore	eVisa	30 days	Visa application can be submitted online using the 'e-Service' through a strategic partner or a local contact in Singapore.; Printed visa authorization must be presented at the time of travel.; Submitting the SG Arrival Card (SGAC) before arrival is a must via the mobile application or the website.; All visitors are fingerprinted upon entry and exit.
Slovakia	Visa required		Registration with the local police within 3 working days of arrival is mandatory.
Slovenia	Visa required		Registration with the local police within 72 hours of arrival is mandatory.
Solomon Islands	Visa required		Visa on arrival for holders of a confirmation that a visa has been approved before departure.
Somalia	eVisa	30 days	
South Africa	ETA		
South Sudan	eVisa		Obtainable online 30 days single entry for 100 USD, 90 days multiple entry for 200 USD and 180 days multiple entry for 350 USD.; Printed visa authorization must be presented at the time of travel.; Visa on arrival for holders of Diplomatic, Service, and Official passports.; Visa on arrival for passengers of Sudanese origin.; Visa on arrival for holders of an identity card copy issued by the United Nations with a clearance from the Ministry of Foreign Affairs in South Sudan.
Spain	Visa required		
Sri Lanka	ETA / Visa on arrival	30 days	
Sudan	Visa required		Visa on arrival for a maximum stay of 60 days for holders of an "Entry Permit" issued by the Sudanese Ministry of interior; Visa on arrival for passengers of Sudanese origin from the father's side provided they present a national ID number, a national ID card, or an old Sudanese passport or birth certificate; Visa on arrival for spouses married to a Sudanese national provided holding a marriage certificate; Registration with the local police within 3 days of arrival is mandatory
Suriname	Visa not required	90 days	An entrance fee of USD 50 or EUR 50 must be paid online prior to arrival.; Multiple entry e-Visa is also available.
Sweden	Visa required		
Switzerland	Visa required		Visa not required for a maximum stay of 90 days within 180 days for holders of Diplomatic, Service, and Official passports.; The form may be filled online and submitted to the diplomatic mission.
Syria	Visa not required	180 days	Free for charge entry.
Tajikistan	Visa not required (conditional) eVisa / Visa on arrival	60 days / 45 days	Visa not required for citizens over the age of 55 and they can stay for up to 14 days.; Obtainable at Dushanbe International Airport.; Printed visa authorization must be presented at the time of travel.; e-Visa holders can enter through all border points.; Extensions of stay is possible up to a maximum stay of 60 days for a fee.
Tanzania	eVisa	90 days	
Thailand	eVisa	60 days	
Timor-Leste	Visa on arrival	30 days	For arrivals by air only.; Valid for 30 days per trip.; Extensions of stay is possible up to a maximum stay of 90 days for a 75 USD.
Togo	eVisa	15 days	
Tonga	Visa required		
Trinidad and Tobago	eVisa	90 days	
Tunisia	Visa required		Visa not required for passengers traveling on an organized tour.
Turkey	Visa not required	90 days	Valid for 90 days within 180 days.; Extensions of stay is not possible, but passengers exceeding the period of 90 days within 180 days should obtain a residence permit ("Ikamet Vesikasi") from the immigration police and must be presented to airport officials upon departure.
Turkmenistan	Visa required		10-day visa on arrival if holding a letter of invitation provided by a company registered in Turkmenistan with a prior approval from the Foreign Ministry. Visitors can apply to extend their stay for an additional 10 days.; When transiting between two non-bordering countries, visitors can obtain a Turkmenistan transit visa for a five-day stay. This must be applied for in advance at the Turkmenistan Embassy. Visitors must also submit copies of the visas for the country of entry into Turkmenistan and the country of departure from Turkmenistan. Visa fee is 20 USD.; Special permits from the Ministry of Foreign Affairs are required prior to arrival if visiting Atamurat, Cheleken, Dashoguz, Serhas, and Serhetabat.; Departure tax applies.
Tuvalu	Visa on arrival	1 month	Valid for 1 month per trip.; Extensions of stay is possible up to a maximum stay of 3 months within 6 months for a fee.
Uganda	eVisa	3 months	Valid for 3 or 6 months per trip, fees may vary accordingly.; Printed visa authorization must be presented at the time of travel; Extensions of stay is possible for a fee.; All visitors are fingerprinted upon entry.; International Certificate of Vaccination is required.
Ukraine	Visa required		Visa not required for passengers under 18 year of age provided their name is mentioned in parent/guardian's visa.
United Arab Emirates	Online Visa required	30 days	May apply for a visa online using 'Smart service'.; Electronic Visas are also available online if residing in one of the 5 other GCC countries. Printed visa authorization must be presented at the time of travel.; Obtainable online if arriving on Air Arabia, Emirates, Etihad, Air Baltic, Air Berlin, Air Serbia, IndiGo, Turkish Airlines and flydubai. Printed visa authorization must be presented at the time of travel.; Extensions of stay is possible up to a maximum stay of 3 months within 6 months for a fee; Iris scan taken upon entry.
United Kingdom	Visa required		Transit Visa required, unless other exemptions apply for Visa-free Direct Airside Transit.
United States	Visa required		Visa not required for holders of a Form I-512. ("Authorization for Parole of an Alien into the United States"); Visa not required for passengers who are admitted to the United States on a visa and are returning to the United States after a visit for a maximum stay of 30 days to Canada, Mexico, or adjacent islands except Cuba.; Obtainable online for non-immigrant visas (DS-160). However, the applicant must attend a scheduled interview at the nearest United States diplomatic mission.; Holders of F or J visas must present an endorsed SEVIS Form I-20MN. Form SEVIS I-20AB for M visa holders, and Form SEVIS DS-2019 for F or J visa holders.; All visitors are fingerprinted upon entry.; Passengers who have a criminal conviction record may be refused entry or transit.
Uruguay	Visa required		Visa not required for passengers who were born in Uruguay.
Uzbekistan	eVisa	30 days	Printed visa authorization must be presented at the time of travel.; Visa not required for a maximum stay of 5 days for land transits across airports.; Visa on arrival for holders of a Visa Confirmation (stamp) issued by a Ministry of Foreign Affairs of Uzbekistan can obtain a visa on arrival at Tashkent (TAS) provided holding two colored passport photos.; Registration with the local police within 3 days of arrival is mandatory.
Vanuatu	eVisa	120 days	
Vatican City	Visa required		
Venezuela	eVisa		Visa not required for a maximum stay of 3 months within 6 months for holders of diplomatic, service, and official passports.; Introduction of e-Visa system for tourist and business travelers.
Vietnam	eVisa		e-Visa is valid for 90 days and multiple entry.; Visa not required for a maximum stay of 30 days at Phu Quoc (PQC) Airport.; Visa not required for a maximum stay of 90 days within 180 days for holders of a Certificate of Visa Exemption issued to former citizens of Vietnam residing abroad.; Visa on arrival at Hanoi (HAN), Ho Chi Minh City (SGN), Da Nang (DAD), or Nha Trang (CXR) airports for a maximum stay of 3 months for holders of a confirmation from the Consular Department (Ministry of Foreign Affairs) that a visa has been approved before departure.
Yemen	Visa required		Visa not required for a maximum stay of 3 months within 6 months for holders of Diplomatic, Service, and Official passports.; Yemen introduced an e-Visa system for visitors who meet certain eligibility requirements (group travel of 10 or more people, business trips, and transit etc.).
Zambia	eVisa	90 days	Printed visa authorization must be presented at the time of travel.; Holders of passports without 2 blank pages may be refused entry.; All visitors are fingerprinted upon entry.; International Certificate of Vaccination is required.
Zimbabwe	eVisa	1 month	Printed visa authorization must be presented at the time of travel.; Visa on arrival for holders of Diplomatic, Service, and Official passports.

=== Dependent, Disputed, or Restricted Territories ===
Visa requirements for citizens of the Republic of Lebanon for visits to various territories, disputed areas, partially recognized countries not mentioned in the list above, and restricted zonesand restricted zones:

Territory	Visa requirement	Notes
Abkhazia	Visa required	Tourists from all countries (except Georgia) can visit Abkhazia for a period not exceeding 24 hours as part of an organized tourist group.
Mount Athos	Special permit required	Special permit is required.; Valid for 4 days for €25 for Eastern Orthodox Church visitors, €35 for non-Orthodox visitors, 18 euros for students).; There is a visitors quota: maximum visitors of 100 Orthodox and 10 non-Orthodox per day and women are not allowed.
(Belarus) Belovezhskaya Pushcha National Park	Visa not required	Valid for 3 days; Electronic pass must be obtained first. Printed visa authorization must be presented at the time of travel.
Republic of Crimea	Visa required	Russian visa required.
Donetsk People's Republic	Restricted area	Crossing from Ukraine requires the purpose of the visit to be explained to Ukrainian passport control on exit.; Passengers who enter from Russia are not allowed to proceed further into Ukraine.
Turkish Republic of Northern Cyprus	Visa not required	Valid for 90 days within 180 days.
(United Nations) UN Buffer Zone in Cyprus	Access Permit required	Access Permit is required for travelling inside the zone, except Civil Use Areas.
Faroe Islands	Visa required	
Gibraltar	Visa required	Visa not required for valid multiple-entry visa holders or residents of the United Kingdom.
Guernsey	Visa required	
Isle of Man	Visa required	
(Norway) Jan Mayen	Permit required	Permit should be obtained from the local police for stays less than 24 hours. or from the Norwegian police for stays beyond 24 hours
Jersey	Visa required	
Kosovo	Visa required	
Lugansk People's Republic	Restricted area	Crossing from Ukraine requires visit purpose to be explained to Ukrainian passport control on exit.; Passengers who entered from Russia are not allowed to proceed further into Ukraine.
Closed cities of Russia	Special authorisation required	Several closed cities and regions in Russia require special authorisation.
(United Kingdom) Principality of Sealand	Visa required	
South Ossetia	Visa required	To enter South Ossetia, visitors must have a multiple-entry visa for Russia and register their stay with the Migration Service of the Ministry of Internal Affairs within 3 days.
Svalbard	Visa not required	Citizens of the Republic of Lebanon do not need a visa or a work or residence permit from Norwegian authorities in order to settle in Svalbard. However, they need a valid Schengen visa if they travel through Norway on their way to or from Svalbard as all regular flights run from and to mainland Norway.
Transnistria	Visa not required	Registration with the local police within 24 hours of arrival is mandatory.
Africa
British Indian Ocean Territory	Special permit required	Special permit is required.
Eritrea outside Asmara	Travel permit required	Travel permit is required to travel to the rest of the country. (20 Eritrean nakfa)
Mayotte	Visa required	
Réunion	Visa required	
Ascension Island	eVisa	Valid for 3 months within 1 year.; Obtainable online.; Printed visa authorization must be presented at the time of travel.
Saint Helena	eVisa	Obtainable online.; Printed visa authorization must be presented at the time of travel.; Visitor's Pass granted on arrival valid for 4/10/21/60/90 days for 12/14/16/20/25 pound sterling.
Tristan da Cunha	Permission required	Permission to land required for 15/30 pounds sterling (yacht/ship passenger) for Tristan da Cunha Island or 20 pounds sterling for Gough Island, Inaccessible Island or Nightingale Islands.
Sahrawi Arab Democratic Republic	—N/a	Undefined visa regime in the Western Sahara controlled territory.
Somaliland	Visa required	
Sudan outside Khartoum	Travel permit required	Travel permit is required if traveling more than 25 kilometers outside of Khartoum.
(Sudan) Darfur	Travel permit required	Separate travel permit is required.
Asia
(Kazakhstan) Baikonur & Gvardeyskiy	Special permission required	Special permission required for visiting the town of Baikonur and surrounding areas in Kyzylorda Oblast, and the town of Gvardeyskiy near Almaty.
India PAP/RAP	PAP/RAP required	Protected Area Permit (PAP) required for whole states of Nagaland and Sikkim and parts of states Manipur, Arunachal Pradesh, Uttaranchal, Jammu and Kashmir, Rajasthan, Himachal Pradesh.; Restricted Area Permit (RAP) required for all of Andaman and Nicobar Islands and parts of Sikkim.; Some of these requirements are occasionally lifted for a year.
Iraqi Kurdistan	eVisa	30 days: e-Visa for 30 days is available at Erbil and Sulaymaniyah airports.
Kazakhstan	Special permission required	Special permission is required for visiting the town of Baikonur and surrounding areas in Kyzylorda Oblast, and the town of Gvardeyskiy near Almaty.
(Iran) Kish Island	Visa not required	Valid for 14 days.
Maldives outside Malé	Permission required	Permission required for visiting non-resort islands. (excluding the capital Malé)
North Korea outside Pyongyang	Special permit required	People are not allowed to leave the capital city, tourists can only leave the capital with a governmental tourist guide. (no independent moving)
(Saudi Arabia) Mecca and Medina	Special access required	Non-Muslims and citizens of the Republic of Lebanon following the Ahmadiyya religious movement are prohibited from entry.
(India) North Sentinel Island	Restricted zone	
Palestine	Visa required	Arrival by sea to Gaza Strip not allowed.
(Malaysia) Sabah and Sarawak	Visa not required	These states have their own immigration authorities and passport is required to travel to them, however the Malaysian visa policy applies.
(Tajikistan) Gorno-Badakhshan Autonomous Province	OIVR permit required	OIVR permit is required (15+5 Tajikistani Somoni) and another free of charge special permit is required for visiting Lake Sarez.
Closed cities of Turkmenistan	Special permit required	Special permit is required prior to arrival for visiting Atamurat, Cheleken, Dashoguz, Serakhs, and Serhetabat.
(Iran) Qeshm	Visa not required	Visa not required for a maximum stay of 14 days.
(United Nations) Korean Demilitarized Zone	Restricted zone	
(United Nations) UNDOF Zone and Ghajar	Restricted zone	
(Vietnam) Phú Quốc	Visa not required	Valid for 30 days within 180 days.
Yemen outside Sana'a or Aden	Special permission required	Special permission is required for travel outside Sana'a or Aden.
Greater China
China	Visa required	Registration with the local police within 24 hours of arrival is mandatory.
(China) Hainan	Visa required	Visa not required for a maximum stay of 15 days for those traveling as part of a tourist group consisting of two or more people.
Hong Kong	eVisa	Visa not required for holders of a Hong Kong (SAR China) permanent identity card which has an asterisk or 'R' code.
Macau	Visa not required	Valid for 90 days within 180 days .; Valid for 1 year for holders of a Hong Kong Permanent Identity Card.; Visa not required for holders of a Hong Kong (SAR China) permanent identity card which has an asterisk or 'R' code.; Extensions of stay is possible for a fee.
(China) Tibet Autonomous Region	TTP is required	Tibet Travel Permit is required (10 USD).
Taiwan	Visa required	Visa not required for a maximum stay of 30 days for holders of an ROC (Taiwan) Business and academic travel card issued by Chinese Taipei.; All visitors are fingerprinted upon entry.
Caribbean and North Atlantic
Closed city of Mercury, Nevada, United States	Special permission required	Special authorization required for entry into Mercury.
Caribbean and North Atlantic.
Anguilla	eVisa	You do NOT need to apply for a visa if: You have a valid visa to enter the UK, US or Canada. A valid UK, US or Canada visa can be used to enter Anguilla.
Aruba	Visa required	Visa is not required for a maximum stay of 90 days within 180 days for valid visa holders or residents of European Union member states and the United Kingdom.
Bermuda	Visa required	Visa not required for a maximum stay of 3 months within 6 months for valid multiple-entry visa holders or residents of Canada, the United Kingdom, or the United States.; Visas and residence permits should be valid for at least 45 days beyond the period of intended stay.
(Netherlands) Bonaire, St. Eustatius and Saba	Visa required	Visa not required for a maximum stay of 90 days within 180 days for valid visa holders or residents of European Union member states.
British Virgin Islands	Visa required	
Cayman Islands	Visa required	
(Colombia) San Andrés and Leticia	Tourist Card on arrival	Tourist card must be obtained on arrival at Gustavo Rojas Pinilla International Airport or Alfredo Vásquez Cobo International Airport.
Curacao	Visa required	Visa not required for a maximum stay of 90 days within 180 days for valid visa holders or residents of European Union member states and the United Kingdom.
(France) French Guiana	Visa required	
(France) French West Indies	Visa required	French West Indies refers to Martinique, Guadeloupe, Saint Martin and Saint Barthélemy.
Greenland	Visa required	
(Venezuela) Margarita Island	Visa required	All visitors are fingerprinted upon entry.
Montserrat	eVisa	Printed visa authorization must be presented at the time of travel.; Valid for 1 year.; Visa not required for a maximum stay of 90 days within 180 days for valid visa holders or residents of Canada, the European Union member states, or the United States.
Puerto Rico	Visa required	Visa not required for holders of a form I-512. (Authorization for Parole of an Alien into the United States); Visa not required if admitted to the United States on a visa.; Visa not required if returning to the United States after a visit of a maximum 30 days to Canada, Mexico, or adjacent islands. (except for Cuba)
Saint Pierre and Miquelon	Visa required	
Sint Maarten	Visa required	Visa not required for a maximum stay of 90 days within 180 days for valid visa holders or residents of EU member states.
Turks and Caicos Islands	Visa required	Visa not required for a maximum stay of 90 days within 180 days for valid visa holders or residents of Canada, the United Kingdom or the United States.
U.S. Virgin Islands	Visa required	Visa not required for holders of a form I-512. ( Authorization for Parole of an Alien into the United States); Visa not required if admitted to the United States on a visa.; Visa not required if returning to the United States after a visit of a maximum 30 days to Canada, Mexico, or adjacent islands. (except for Cuba)
Oceania
American Samoa	Visa required	
(Australia) Ashmore and Cartier Islands	Special authorisation required	Special authorisation is required.
(France) Clipperton Island	Special permit required	Special permit is required.
Cook Islands	Visa not required	Valid for 31 days.; Visa not required for Cook Islanders or for descendants of Cook Islanders.; Extensions of stay is possible up to a maximum stay of 6 months for a fee.
(Fiji) Lau Province	Special permission required	Special permission is required.
French Polynesia	Visa required	
Guam	Visa required	Visa is not required for if arriving directly from the United States, Northern Mariana Islands, Puerto Rico, American Samoa, Swain Island or the United States Virgin Islands.
New Caledonia	Visa required	
Niue	Visa not required	Valid for 30 days.; Extensions of stay is possible for a fee.
Northern Mariana Islands	Visa required	
Pitcairn Islands	Visa not required	Valid for 14 days.; Landing fee of 35 USD or tax of 5 USD if not going ashore applies<.
Tokelau	Entry permit required	
United States Minor Outlying Islands	Special permits required	Special permits are required for Baker Island, Howland Island, Jarvis Island, Johnston Atoll, Kingman Reef, Midway Atoll, Palmyra Atoll and Wake Island.
Wallis and Futuna	Visa required	
South America
Galápagos	Pre-registration required	60 days; Visitors must pre-register to receive a 20 USD Transit Control Card (TCT).
South Atlantic and Antarctica
Falkland Islands	Visa required	
South Georgia and the South Sandwich Islands	Permit required	Pre-arrival permit from the Commissioner is required. (72 hours / 1 month for 110 / 160 pounds sterling)
Antarctica	Special Permits Required	Special permits required for Bouvet Island, British Antarctic Territory, French Southern and Antarctic Lands, Argentine Antarctica, (Australia) Australian Antarctic Territory, (Antártica Chilena Province) Chilean Antarctic Territory, (Australia) Heard Island and McDonald Islands, (Norway) Peter I Island, (Norway) Queen Maud Land, (New Zealand) Ross Dependency.

== Non-ordinary passports ==
Holders of diplomatic, official or service passports issued by the Republic of Lebanon have visa-free or visa on arrival access to the following additional countries and territories (both mutual and unilateral):

Type of passport	Visa-free access
Diplomatic, official or service passports	Armenia, Bahrain, Brazil, Burkina Faso, Chile, Cape Verde, China, Colombia, Cuba, Cyprus, Egypt, Ethiopia, Guyana, Hungary, Iran, Iraq, Jordan, South Korea, Switzerland, Malaysia, Mali, Malta, Oman, Paraguay, Peru, Qatar, Serbia, South Sudan, Suriname, Syria, Turkey, Uruguay, Venezuela, Yemen and Zimbabwe.

== Non-visa restrictions ==
=== Blank passport pages ===
Many countries require a minimum number of blank pages to be available in the passport being presented, typically one or two pages. Endorsement pages, which often appear after the visa pages, are not counted as being valid or available.

=== Vaccination ===
Cover of the new International Certificate of Vaccination issued by the Bureau of Quarantine in the Philippines since 2021

The African countries of Angola, Benin, Burkina Faso, Burundi, Cameroon, Central African Republic, Democratic Republic of the Congo, Republic of the Congo, Côte d'Ivoire, Gabon, Ghana, Guinea-Bissau, Mali, Niger, Sierra Leone and Togo, South Sudan and Uganda, along with French Guiana in South America, require all incoming passengers older than nine months to one year, to have a current International Certificate of Vaccination or Prophylaxis.

Some other countries require vaccination only if the passenger is coming from an infected area or has visited one recently or has transited for 12 hours in those countries: Algeria, Botswana, Cabo Verde, Chad, Djibouti, Egypt, Eswatini, Ethiopia, Gambia, Ghana, Guinea, Lesotho, Libya, Equatorial Guinea, Eritrea, Madagascar, Malawi, Mauritania, Mauritius, Mozambique, Namibia, Nigeria, Papua New Guinea, Seychelles, Somalia, South Africa, Sudan, Tunisia, Uganda, Tanzania, Zambia and Zimbabwe.

=== Passport validity length ===
Very few countries, such as Paraguay, just require a valid passport on arrival.

However many countries and groupings now require only an identity card – especially from their neighbours. Other countries may have special bilateral arrangements that depart from the generality of their passport validity length policies to shorten the period of passport validity required for each other's citizens or even accept passports that have already expired (but not been cancelled).

Some countries, such as Japan, Ireland and the United Kingdom, require a passport valid throughout the period of the intended stay.

In the absence of specific bilateral agreements, countries requiring passports to be valid for at least 6 more months on arrival include Afghanistan, Algeria, Anguilla, Bahrain, Bhutan, Botswana, British Virgin Islands, Brunei, Cambodia, Cameroon, Cape Verde, Cayman Islands, Central African Republic, Chad, Comoros, Costa Rica, Côte d'Ivoire, Curaçao, Ecuador, Egypt, El Salvador, Equatorial Guinea, Fiji, Gabon, Guinea Bissau, Guyana, Haiti, India, Indonesia, Iran, Iraq, Israel, Jordan, Kenya, Kiribati, Kuwait, Laos, Madagascar, Malaysia, Marshall Islands, Mongolia, Myanmar, Namibia, Nepal, Nicaragua, Nigeria, Oman, Palau, Papua New Guinea, Peru, Philippines, Qatar, Rwanda, Samoa, Saudi Arabia, Singapore, Solomon Islands, Somalia, Sri Lanka, Sudan, Suriname, Tanzania, Thailand, Timor-Leste, Tokelau, Tonga, Turkey, Tuvalu, Uganda, United Arab Emirates, Vanuatu, Venezuela, and Vietnam.

Countries requiring passports valid for at least 4 months on arrival include Micronesia and Zambia.

Countries requiring passports with a validity of at least 3 months beyond the date of intended departure include Azerbaijan, Bosnia and Herzegovina, Honduras, Montenegro, Nauru, Moldova and New Zealand. Similarly, the EEA countries of Iceland, Liechtenstein, Norway, all European Union countries (except Ireland) together with Switzerland also require 3 months validity beyond the date of the bearer's intended departure unless the bearer is an EEA or Swiss national.

Countries requiring passports valid for at least 3 months on arrival include Albania, North Macedonia, Panama, and Senegal.

Bermuda requires passports to be valid for at least 45 days upon entry.

Countries that require a passport validity of at least one month beyond the date of intended departure include Eritrea, Hong Kong, Lebanon, Macau, the Maldives and South Africa.

==== Maximum passport age ====
Countries of the Schengen area require non-EU passports to be less than 10 years old upon entry.

=== Criminal record ===
Some countries, including Australia, Canada, Fiji, New Zealand and the United States, routinely deny entry to non-citizens who have a criminal record, while others impose restrictions depending on the type of conviction and the length of the sentence.

=== Persona non grata ===
The government of a country can declare a diplomat persona non grata, banning them from entering the country or expelling them if they have already entered. In non-diplomatic use, the authorities of a country may also declare a foreigner persona non grata permanently or temporarily, usually because of unlawful activity.

=== Israeli stamps ===
Kuwait, Lebanon, Libya, and Yemen do not allow entry to people with passport stamps from Israel or whose passports have either a used or an unused Israeli visa, or where there is evidence of previous travel to Israel such as entry or exit stamps from neighbouring border posts in transit countries such as Jordan and Egypt.

To circumvent this Arab League boycott of Israel, the Israeli immigration services have now mostly ceased to stamp foreign nationals' passports on either entry to or exit from Israel (unless the entry is for some work-related purposes). Since 15 January 2013, Israel no longer stamps foreign passports at Ben Gurion Airport. Passports are still (as of 22 June 2017) stamped at Erez when passing into and out of Gaza.

Iran refuses admission to holders of passports containing an Israeli visa or stamp that is less than 12 months old.

=== Biometrics ===
Several countries mandate that all travellers, or all foreign travellers, be fingerprinted on arrival and will refuse admission to or even arrest travellers who refuse to comply. In some countries, such as the United States, this may apply even to transit passengers who merely wish to change planes rather than go landside.

Fingerprinting countries/regions include Afghanistan, Argentina, Brunei, Cambodia, China, Ethiopia, Ghana, Guinea, India, Japan, Kenya (both fingerprints and a photo are taken), Malaysia upon entry and departure, Mongolia, Saudi Arabia, the Schengen Area, Singapore, South Korea, Taiwan, Thailand, Uganda, the United Arab Emirates and the United States.

Many countries also require a photo be taken of people entering the country. The United States, which does not fully implement exit control formalities at its land frontiers (although long mandated by its own legislation), intends to implement facial recognition for passengers departing from international airports to identify people who overstay their visa.

Together with fingerprint and face recognition, iris scanning is one of three biometric identification technologies internationally standardised since 2006 by the International Civil Aviation Organization (ICAO) for use in e-passports and the United Arab Emirates conducts iris scanning on visitors who need to apply for a visa. The United States Department of Homeland Security has announced plans to greatly increase the biometric data it collects at US borders. In 2018, Singapore began trials of iris scanning at three land and maritime immigration checkpoints.

== Consular protection abroad ==
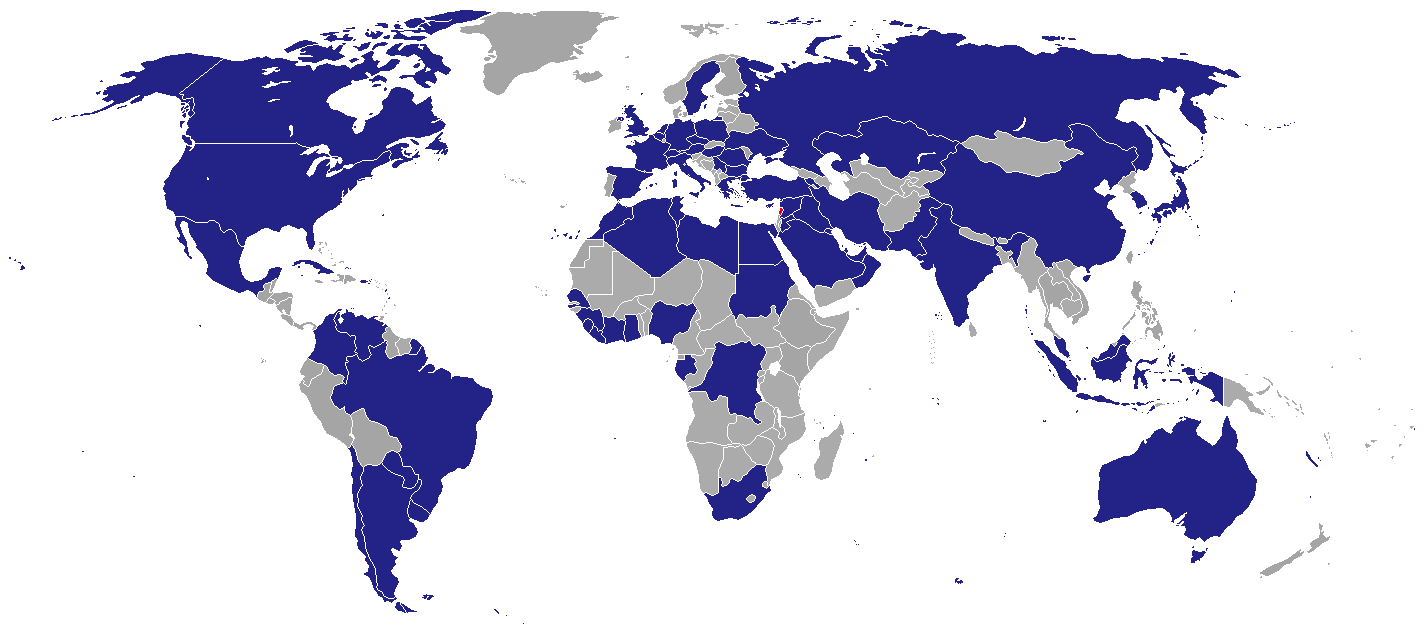
Diplomatic missions of the Republic of Lebanon

Diplomatic Missions of the Republic of Lebanon are to advance the interests of the Republic of Lebanon, and to serve and protect the citizens of the Republic of Lebanon. There are currently 104 diplomatic missions of the Republic of Lebanon abroad. See also List of diplomatic missions of Lebanon.

== See also ==
- Visa policy of Lebanon
- Lebanese passport
- Constitution of Lebanon
- Driving license in Lebanon
- Foreign relations of Lebanon
- History of Lebanon
- Lebanese diaspora
- Lebanese identity card
- Lebanese nationality law
- Politics of Lebanon
- Vehicle registration plates of Lebanon
