= Vaccine passport =

Vaccine passport may refer to:

- Immunity passport, also known as an immunity certificate, health pass, or release certificate, a medical record for travel purposes
- International Certificate of Vaccination or Prophylaxis, also known as Carte Jaune or Yellow Card, a vaccination certificate issued by the World Health Organization
- Vaccine passports during the COVID-19 pandemic, a type of immunity passport specific to the COVID-19 pandemic
