= Vaccination requirements for international travel =

Vaccination requirements for international travel are the aspect of vaccination policy that concerns the movement of people across borders. Countries around the world require travellers departing to other countries, or arriving from other countries, to be vaccinated against certain infectious diseases in order to prevent epidemics. At border checks, these travellers are required to show proof of vaccination against specific diseases; the most widely used vaccination record is the International Certificate of Vaccination or Prophylaxis (ICVP or Carte Jaune/Yellow Card). Some countries require information about a passenger's vaccination status in a passenger locator form.

== Historic requirements ==
=== Smallpox (1944–1981) ===
The first International Certificate of Vaccination against Smallpox was developed by the 1944 International Sanitary Convention (itself an amendment of the 1926 International Sanitary Convention on Maritime Navigation and the 1933 International Sanitary Convention for Aerial Navigation). The initial certificate was valid for a maximum of three years.

The policy had a few flaws: the smallpox vaccination certificates were not always checked by qualified airport personnel, or when passengers transferred at airports in smallpox-free countries. Travel agencies mistakenly provided certificates to some unvaccinated customers, and there were some instances of falsified documents. Lastly, a small number of passengers carrying valid certificates still contracted smallpox because they were improperly vaccinated. However, all experts agree that the mandatory possession of vaccination certificates significantly increased the number of travellers who were vaccinated, and thus contributed to preventing the spread of smallpox, especially when the rapid expansion of air travel in the 1960s and 1970s reduced the travelling time from endemic countries to all other countries to just a few hours.

After smallpox was successfully eradicated in 1980, the International Certificate of Vaccination against Smallpox was cancelled in 1981, and the new 1983 form lacked any provision for smallpox vaccination.

== Current requirements ==
=== Yellow fever ===
Vaccination against yellow fever ten days before entering this country/territory is required for travellers coming from ... All countries Risk countries (including airport transfers) (Note: Also required for travellers having transited (more than 12 hours) through a risk country's airport.) Risk countries (excluding airport transfers) (Note: Not required for travellers having transited through a risk country's airport.) No requirement (risk country) (Note: The WHO has designated (parts of) Argentina, Brazil and Peru as risk countries, but these countries do not require incoming travellers to vaccinate against yellow fever.) No requirement (non-risk country)

Travellers who wish to enter certain countries or territories must be vaccinated against yellow fever ten days before crossing the border, and be able to present a vaccination record/certificate at the border checks. In most cases, this travel requirement depends on whether the country they are travelling from has been designated by the World Health Organization as being a "country with risk of yellow fever transmission". In a few countries, it does not matter which country the traveller comes from: everyone who wants to enter these countries must be vaccinated against yellow fever. There are exemptions for newborn children; in most cases, any child who is at least nine months or one year old needs to be vaccinated.

=== Polio ===
Polio vaccination is required for travellers ... From all countries, to all countries From some countries, to all countries From some countries, to all countries From some countries, to some countries To some countries From some countries

Travellers who wish to enter or leave certain countries must be vaccinated against polio, usually at most twelve months and at least four weeks before crossing the border, and be able to present a vaccination record/certificate at the border checks. Most requirements apply only to travel to or from so-called polio-endemic, polio-affected, polio-exporting, polio-transmission, or "high-risk" countries. As of August 2020, Afghanistan and Pakistan are the only polio-endemic countries in the world (where wild polio has not yet been eradicated). Several countries have additional precautionary polio vaccination travel requirements, for example to and from "key at-risk countries", which as of December 2020 include China, Indonesia, Mozambique, Myanmar, and Papua New Guinea.

=== Meningococcal meningitis ===
Travellers need to show proof of meningococcal vaccination ... Upon arrival in the Hajj and Umrah zones (foreign and domestic pilgrims, workers, and residents of Mecca and Medina) Before departure to Hajj and Umrah in Saudi Arabia, and to certain African countries Before departure to and upon arrival from Saudi Arabia Before departure to Hajj and Umrah in Saudi Arabia Upon arrival African meningitis belt: vaccination recommended for visitors

Travellers who wish to enter or leave certain countries or territories must be vaccinated against meningococcal meningitis, preferably 10–14 days before crossing the border, and be able to present a vaccination record/certificate at the border checks. Countries with required meningococcal vaccination for travellers include The Gambia, Indonesia, Lebanon, Libya, the Philippines, and most importantly and extensively Saudi Arabia for Muslims visiting or working in Mecca and Medina during the Hajj or Umrah pilgrimages. For some countries in African meningitis belt, vaccinations prior to entry are not required, but highly recommended.

=== COVID-19 ===
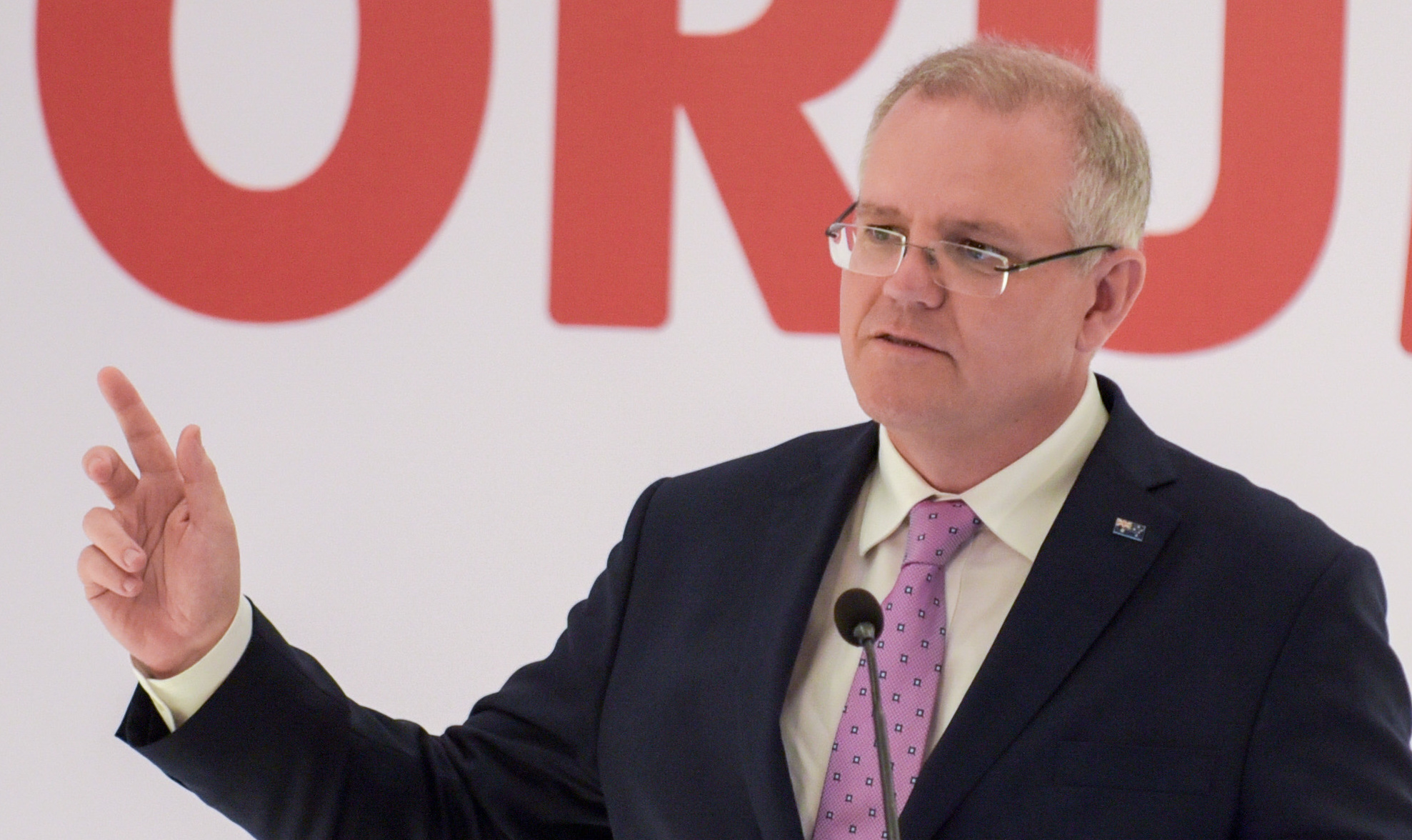
Scott Morrison: "People have the choice of two weeks of quarantine or being vaccinated."

During the COVID-19 pandemic, several COVID-19 vaccines were developed, and in December 2020 the first vaccination campaign was planned.

Anticipating the vaccine, on 23 November 2020, Qantas announced that the company would ask for proof of COVID-19 vaccination from international travellers. According to Alan Joyce, the firm's CEO, a coronavirus vaccine would become a "necessity" when travelling, "We are looking at changing our terms and conditions to say for international travellers, we will ask people to have a vaccination before they can get on the aircraft." Australian Prime Minister Scott Morrison subsequently announced that all international travellers who fly to Australia without proof of a COVID-19 vaccination will be required to quarantine at their own expense. Victoria Premier Daniel Andrews and the CEOs of Melbourne Airport, Brisbane Airport and Flight Centre all supported the Morrison government's "no jab, no fly" policy, with only Sydney Airport's CEO suggesting advanced testing might also be sufficient to eliminate quarantine in the future. The International Air Transport Association (IATA) announced that it was almost finished with developing a digital health pass which states air passengers' COVID-19 testing and vaccination information to airlines and governments.

Korean Air and Air New Zealand were seriously considering mandatory vaccination as well, but would negotiate it with their respective governments. KLM CEO Pieter Elbers responded on 24 November that KLM does not yet have any plans for mandatory vaccination on its flights. Brussels Airlines and Lufthansa said they had no plans yet on requiring passengers to present proof of vaccination before boarding, but Brussels Airport CEO Arnaud Feist agreed with Qantas' policy, stating: "Sooner or later, having proof of vaccination or a negative test will become compulsory." Ryanair announced it would not require proof of vaccination for air travel within the EU, EasyJet stated it would not require any proof at all. The Irish Times commented that a vaccination certificate for flying was quite common in countries around the world for other diseases, such as for yellow fever in many African countries.

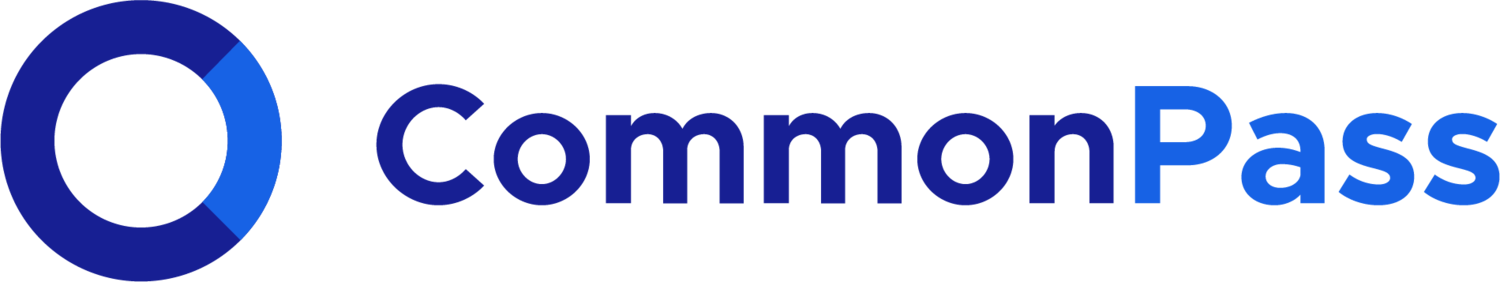
CommonPass logo

On 25 November, separately from IATA's digital health pass initiative, five major airlines – United Airlines, Lufthansa, Virgin Atlantic, Swiss International Air Lines, and JetBlue – announced the 1 December 2020 introduction of the CommonPass, which shows the results of passengers' COVID-19 tests. It was designed as an international standard by the World Economic Forum and The Commons Project, and set up in such a way that it could also be used to record vaccination results in the future. It standardises test results and aims to prevent forgery of vaccination records, while storing only limited data on a passenger's phone to safeguard their privacy. The CommonPass had already successfully undergone a trial period in October with United Airlines and Cathay Pacific.

On 26 November, the Danish Ministry of Health confirmed that it was working on a COVID-19 "vaccine passport" or simply Vaccination card which would likely not only work as proof of vaccination for air travel, but also for other activities such as concerts, private parties and access to various businesses, a perspective welcomed by the Confederation of Danish Industry. The Danish College of General Practitioners also welcomed the project, saying that it doesn't force anyone to vaccinate, but encourages them to do so if they want to enjoy certain privileges in society.

Irish Foreign Minister Simon Coveney said on 27 November 2020 that, although he "currently has no plans" for a passport vaccination stamp, his government was working on changing the passenger locator form to include proof of PCR negative tests for the coronavirus, and that it was likely to be further adjusted to include vaccination data when a COVID-19 vaccine would become available. Coveney stressed that "We do not want, following enormous efforts and sacrifices from people, to reintroduce the virus again through international travel, which is a danger if it is not managed right."

==== IATA Travel Pass app ====
The IATA Travel Pass application for smartphone has been developed by the International Air Transport Association (IATA) in early 2021. The mobile app standardizes the health verification process confirming whether passengers have been vaccinated against, or tested negative for, COVID-19 prior to travel. Passengers will use the app to create a digital passport linked to their e-passport, receive test results and vaccination details from laboratories, and share that information with airlines and authorities. The application is intended to replace the existing paper-based method of providing proof of vaccination in international travel, colloquially known as the Yellow Card. Trials of the application are carried out by a number of airlines including Singapore Airlines, Emirates, Qatar Airways, Etihad and Air New Zealand.

It has been opined that many countries will increasingly consider the vaccination status of travellers when deciding to allow them entry or not or require them to quarantine since recently published research shows that the Pfizer vaccine effect lasts for at least six months.

== Recommendations ==
Various vaccines are not legally required for travellers, but highly recommended by the World Health Organization. For example, for areas with risk of meningococcal meningitis infection in countries in African meningitis belt, vaccinations prior to entry are not required by these countries, but nevertheless highly recommended by the WHO.

As of July 2019, ebola vaccines and malaria vaccines were still in development and not yet recommended for travellers. Instead, the WHO recommends various other means of prevention, including several forms of chemoprophylaxis, in areas where there is a significant risk of becoming infected with malaria.

== See also ==
- International Certificate of Vaccination or Prophylaxis (ICVP), also known as Carte Jaune or Yellow Card
- Travel medicine
- Immunity passport
