= International Sanitary Convention for Aerial Navigation (1933) =

The International Sanitary Convention for Aerial Navigation (1933) was an international sanitary convention, drawn up in 1932 and signed at The Hague on 12 April 1933 (without a conference) and came into force on 1 August 1935 to protect communities against diseases liable to be imported by aircraft and to protect air crew against diseases due to flying. It contained a number of regulations consisting of measures to prevent the spread of plague, cholera, yellow fever, typhus and smallpox. It was formally ratified by around ten countries. Service aircraft were included in March 1939. Intelligence on infectious disease at ports was provided to health authorities by the health organisation at the League of Nations. It was amended in Washington on 15 December 1944, to form the International Sanitary Convention for Aerial Navigation (1944), which came into force on 15 January 1945.

After the amendment of the Convention in 1944, in addition to Personal, Aircraft and Maritime Declarations of Health, the Convention covered five certificates:

1. International Certificate of Inoculation Against Cholera.
2. International Certificate of Inoculation Against Yellow Fever.
3. International Certificate of Immunity Against Yellow Fever.
4. International Certificate of Inoculation Against Typhus Fever.
5. International Certificate of Vaccination Against Smallpox.

The old International Certificates of Inoculation and Vaccination remained valid until they expired, after which they were replaced by the International Certificate of Vaccination (Carte Jaune).

== See also ==
- International Certificate of Vaccination (Carte Jaune)
- Immunity passport
- International Sanitary Conferences
- Vaccination requirements for international travel
