= International Certificate of Vaccination or Prophylaxis =

International certificate of vaccination

Cover of the new International Certificate of Vaccination issued by the Bureau of Quarantine in the Philippines since 2021.

The International Certificate of Vaccination or Prophylaxis (ICVP), also known as the Carte Jaune or Yellow Card, is an official vaccination report created by the World Health Organization (WHO). As a travel document, it is a kind of medical passport that is recognised internationally and may be required for entry to certain countries where there are increased health risks for travellers.

The ICVP is not an immunity passport; the primary difference is that vaccination certificates such as the ICVP incentivise individuals to obtain vaccination against a disease, while immunity passports incentivise individuals to get infected with and recover from a disease.

Various schemes for health passports or vaccination certificates have been proposed for people who have been vaccinated against COVID-19.

== Name ==
The ICVP's nickname Yellow Card or its French equivalent Carte Jaune derives from the yellow colour of the document. The fact that yellow fever is a commonly required vaccination for travel has contributed to the document's association with the colour yellow, even though the ICVP can cover a wide range of vaccinations and booster shots, not just yellow fever.

== History ==
=== International Sanitary Conventions (1933–1951) ===
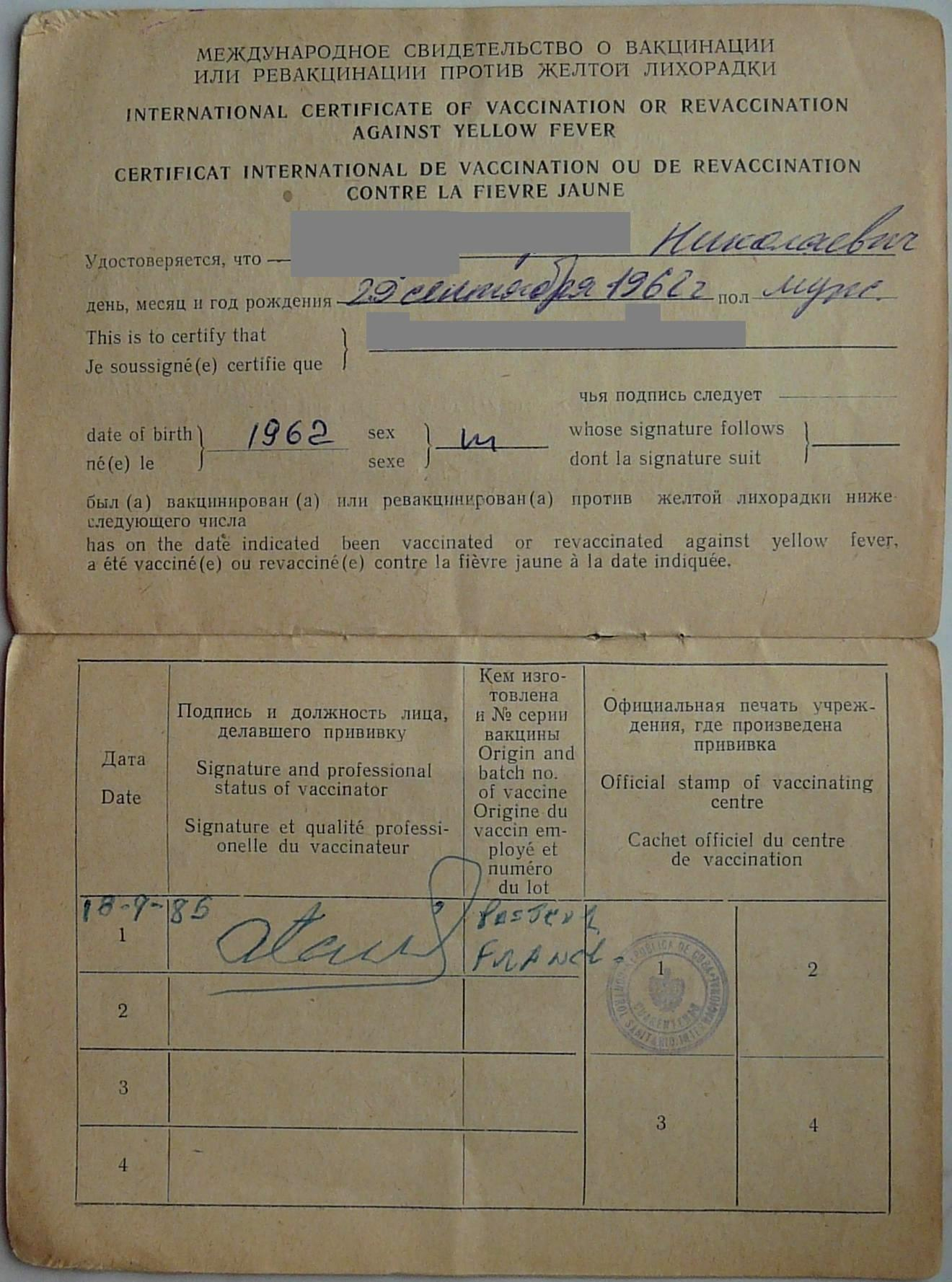
An International Certificate of Vaccination or Revaccination Against Yellow Fever, issued in the Soviet Union in 1985.

The International Certificate of Inoculation and Vaccination was established by the International Sanitary Convention for Aerial Navigation (1933) in The Hague, which came into force on 1 August 1935 and was amended in 1944. After the 1944 amendment, in addition to Personal, Aircraft and Maritime Declarations of Health, the Convention covered five certificates:

1. International Certificate of Inoculation Against Cholera.
2. International Certificate of Inoculation Against Yellow Fever.
3. International Certificate of Immunity Against Yellow Fever.
4. International Certificate of Inoculation Against Typhus Fever.
5. International Certificate of Vaccination Against Smallpox.

=== International Sanitary Regulations (1951–1969) ===
The World Health Organization (WHO) was formed by its constitution on 22 July 1946, effective on 7 April 1948. The WHO Constitution included stipulations to stimulate and advance work to eradicate epidemic, endemic and other diseases (Article 2.g) and that the World Health Assembly would have authority to adopt regulations concerning sanitary and quarantine requirements and other procedures designed to prevent the international spread of disease (Article 21.a). The Fourth World Health Assembly adopted the International Sanitary Regulations (alias WHO Regulations No. 2) on 25 May 1951, replacing and completing the earlier International Sanitary Conventions. It confirmed the validity and use of international certificates of vaccination (Article 115), and updated the old model with a new version (Appendices 2, 3, 4). The certificates mentioned were used for proof of vaccination against diseases such as cholera, yellow fever and smallpox; the term inoculation was no longer used. The old International Certificates of Inoculation and Vaccination remained valid until they expired, after which they were replaced by the new ICV. On 23 May 1956, the Ninth World Health Assembly amended the form of the International Certificate of Vaccination or Revaccination against Smallpox per 1 October 1956.

=== International Health Regulations (1969–present) ===
The WHO's World Health Assembly adopted the International Health Regulations (IHR) in 1969, succeeding the previous International Sanitary Conventions/Regulations. IHR Article 79 introduced a model International Certificate of Vaccination, and Appendix 2 and Annex VI stipulated a number of conditions that had to be fulfilled in order for it to be considered valid, such as being printed and filled out in English and French (a third language, relevant to the territory in which it is issued, could be added). The 1969 IHR focused on four diseases: cholera, plague, smallpox, and yellow fever; however, Article 51 specified that vaccination against plague would not be required as a condition of admission of any person to a territory. The World Health Assembly determined in 1973 that vaccination against cholera was unable to prevent the introduction of cholera from one country to another, and removed this requirement from the 1973 revision of the IHR; it was also removed from the ICV.

The ICV was most successful in the case of smallpox. The mandatory possession of vaccination certificates significantly increased the number of travellers who were vaccinated, and thus contributed to preventing the spread of smallpox, especially when the rapid expansion of air travel in the 1960s and 1970s reduced the travelling time from endemic countries to all other countries to just a few hours. After smallpox was successfully eradicated in 1980, the International Certificate of Vaccination against Smallpox was cancelled in 1981, and the new 1983 form lacked any provision for smallpox vaccination. Thus, only yellow fever remained as vaccination requirement for international travel for which the ICV was used.

By 1994, Saudi Arabia legally required pilgrims going to Mecca for the annual Hajj to vaccinate against meningococcal meningitis, while the Centers for Disease Control also advised Americans travelling to the African meningitis belt or Kenya, Tanzania and Burundi to take the vaccine, especially when visiting during the dry season (November–April).

The 2002–2004 SARS outbreak was the driving force behind the 23 May 2005 revision of the International Health Regulations, which entered into force on 15 June 2007. On that day, the model International Certificate of Vaccination or Prophylaxis contained in Annex 6 of the International Health Regulations (as amended in 2005) replaced the International Certificate of Vaccination or Revaccination against Yellow Fever contained in appendix 2 of the International Health Regulations (1969).

== Contents ==
=== Required components ===
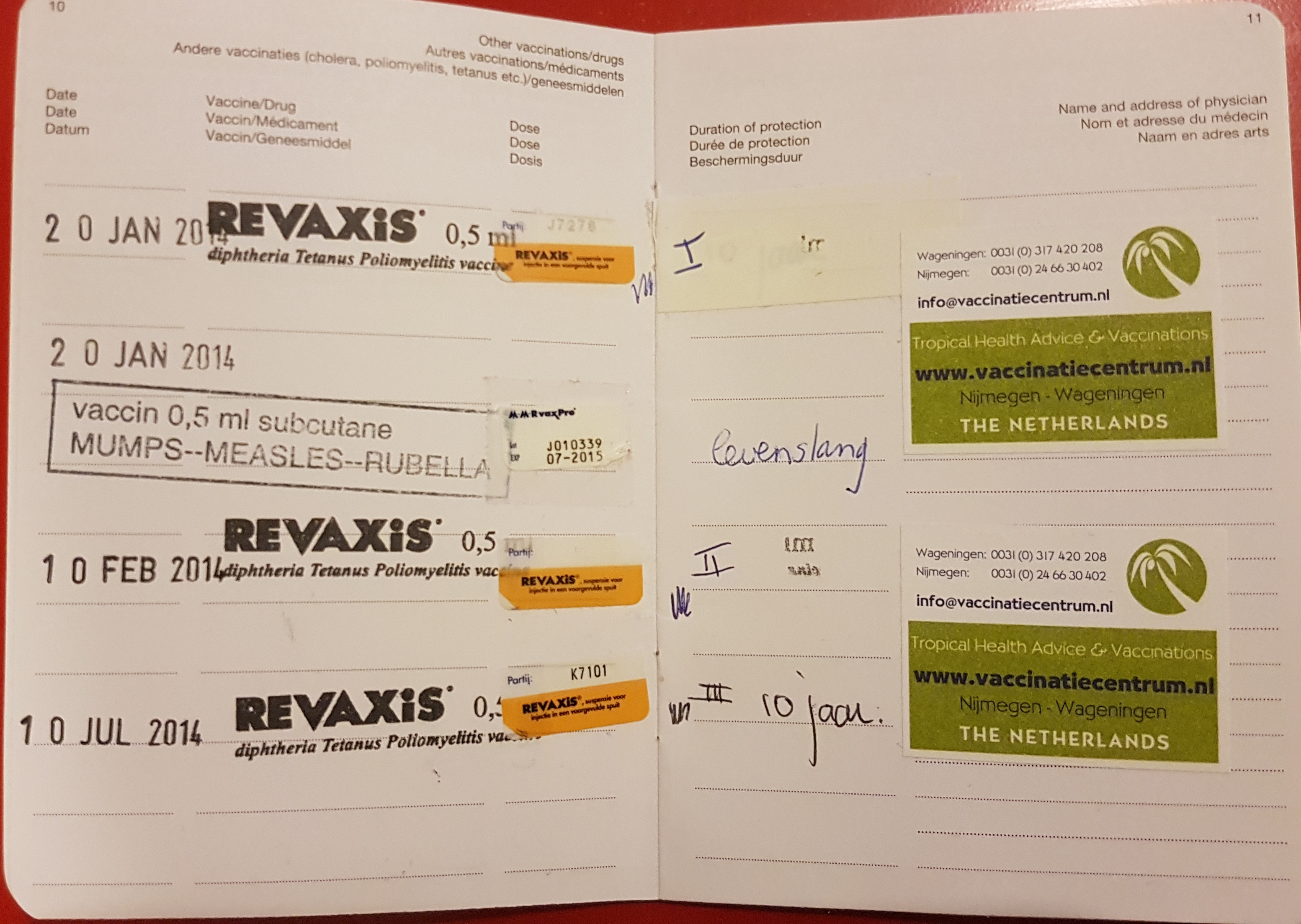
An ICVP issued in the Netherlands, recording proof of vaccination against diphtheria, tetanus, polio (DTP), and mumps, measles and rubella (MMR)

The main portion of the ICVP is a form for physicians to fill out when administering a vaccine. This section is mandated by the WHO's 2005 International Health Regulations, in which they provide a model of the document. It includes places for the traveller's name, date of birth, sex, nationality, national identification document, and signature. Below that is a row for each vaccine administered, in which the physician must include the prophylaxis or vaccine administered, date, signature, manufacturer and batch number, dates valid, and an official stamp from the administering centre.

Below this, the document outlines requirements for validity. The ICVP is only valid for vaccines approved by the WHO. The form must be fully completed in English or French by a medical practitioner or authorized health worker and must include the official stamp of the administering centre. The certificate is valid for as long as the vaccines included are valid.

=== Additional sections ===
The form may include additional information. In 2007, the WHO prepared a booklet that included the following additional sections.

==== Notes ====
The notes section includes information about yellow fever, since it is the only disease included in the International Health Regulations. It also specifies that the same certificate can be used if any future regulations require vaccination for another disease.

==== Information for travellers ====
The information for travellers section recommends that travellers consult their physicians to determine appropriate vaccinations before international travel and inform their physician of international travel if they fall ill after their trip.

==== Protection against malaria ====
Malaria is a serious disease with no vaccine available. The ICVP recommends that travellers protect against mosquitos through mosquito nets or repellent, as mosquitos can transmit malaria. Travellers can also consult their physician for antimalarial medication, which must be taken regularly for the full duration of the prescription.

==== Information for physicians ====
The ICVP gives instructions for filling out the certificate. It also gives physicians guidelines for documenting contraindications in cases where a traveller has a medical reason that prevents them from getting a particular vaccine. This section also reminds physicians to consider travel-associated illnesses when treating a patient who has fallen ill after traveling.

== Additional information ==
=== Yellow fever ===
Vaccination against yellow fever 10 days before entering this country/territory is required for travellers coming from... All countries Risk countries (including airport transfers) (Note: Also required for travellers having spent more than 12 hours in transit in an at risk country's airport.) Risk countries (excluding airport transfers) (Note: Not required for travellers having transited through a risk country's airport.) No requirement (risk country) (Note: The WHO has designated parts of Argentina, Brazil and Peru as risk countries, but these countries do not require incoming travellers to vaccinate against yellow fever.) No requirement (non-risk country)

Yellow fever is the most common vaccine required for international travel. Many countries require the vaccine for all travellers or only for travellers coming from countries with risk of yellow fever transmission. Exceptions are typically made for newborns until 9 months or one year of age, depending on the country. The ICVP form is valid for yellow fever starting 10 days after vaccination. As of 2016, the vaccine is valid for the life of the traveller. No changes need to be made for those who received their vaccine or ICVP prior to 2016.

=== Exceptions ===
In the event that a traveller cannot be vaccinated for a particular disease for medical reasons, their physician can provide them with documentation indicating their condition. They may be subject to additional requirements, such as isolation, quarantine, or observation. A traveller who refuses a vaccine or prophylaxis that is required may be subject to similar requirements or denied entry. In some cases, equivalent military-issued forms are accepted in place of the ICVP, provided the forms include the same information.

=== Digital versions ===
Due to the prevalence of counterfeit certificates in some places, several countries, including Zimbabwe, Zambia, and Nigeria, are developing digital certificates that can authenticate an ICVP. As of July 2019, Nigeria requires its citizens to have its digital "e-Yellow Card" for travel outside the country. The card has a QR code that can be scanned to verify its validity. This requirement does not affect travellers from other countries with valid ICVPs, but those arriving in Nigeria who haven't been vaccinated for yellow fever may receive the vaccine and the e-Yellow Card upon arrival. As of September 2023, Ecuador started handing out digital certificates too and is no longer going to issue yellow booklets after they are out of stock.

=== COVID-19 vaccination ===
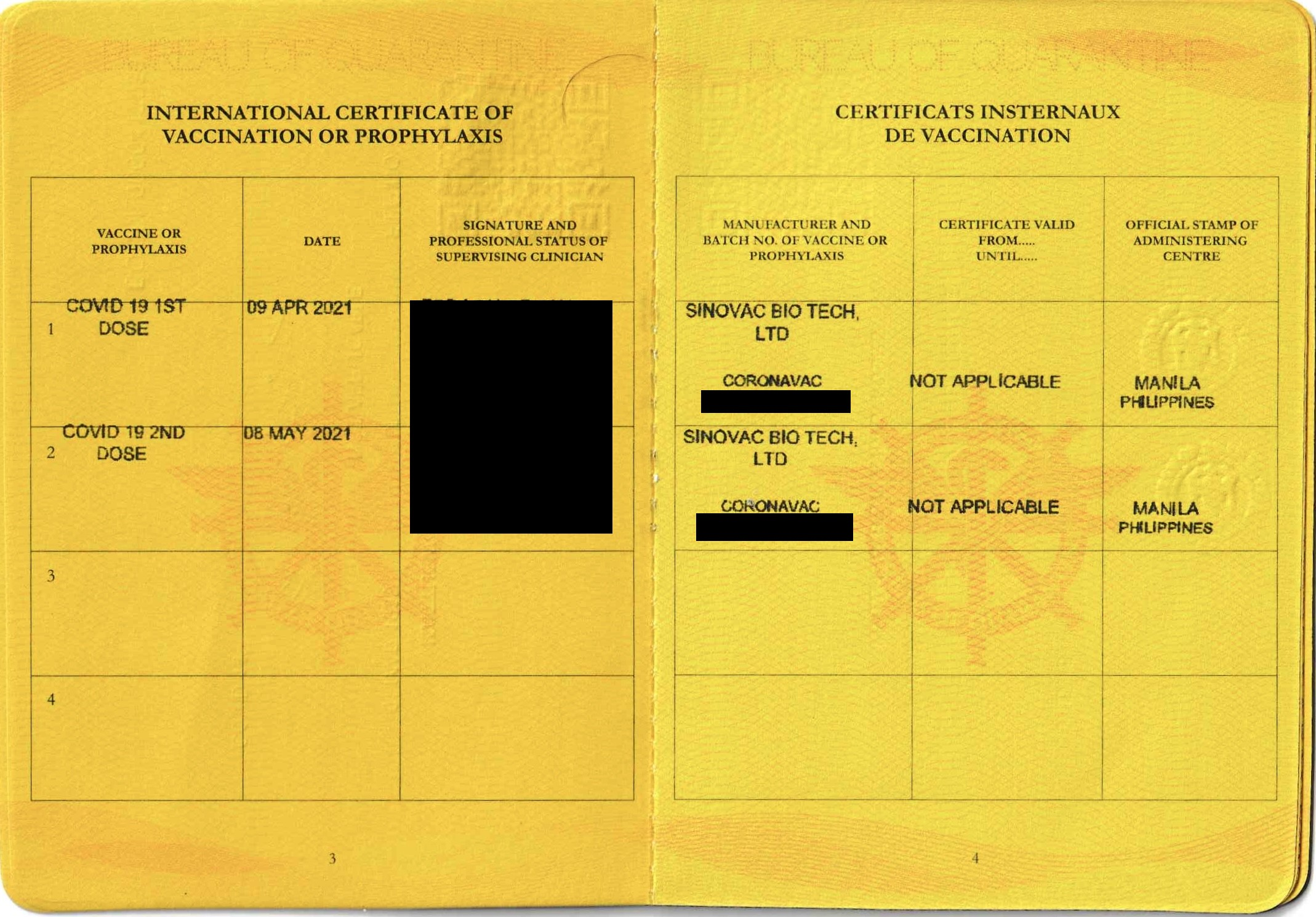
An International Certificate of Vaccination issued by the Bureau of Quarantine in the Philippines after being vaccinated with a COVID-19 vaccine in 2021.

Similar schemes have been proposed for travellers who have been vaccinated against COVID-19.

Multiple agencies and countries were creating different forms of documentation for people who have been vaccinated against COVID-19. Agencies attempting this include non-profit organisations such as World Economic Forum and the Commons Project Foundation, technology companies such as IBM, travel companies such as VeriFly, and the International Air Transport Association. As of March 2021, standards for digital documentation, such as an app on a smartphone, had not been established. On 12 March 2021, Ecma International announced its intention to create international standards which guard against counterfeiting and protects private data as much as possible in a "Call for Participation on Vaccine Passports International Standardization".

With COVID-19 vaccines showing promising results, several industry organizations including global airline lobby IATA and the World Economic Forum have announced pilots. IATA's solution, "Travel Pass", is a mobile app that can display test results, proof of inoculation and will be integrated with the existing TIMATIC system.

Israel employed a digital "green pass" to allow individuals fully vaccinated against COVID-19 to dine out, attend concerts, and travel to other nations. It has been the subject of several privacy and data security concerns. Shortly after the scheme was rolled out, the Knesset passed a law allowing local authorities to compile data on citizens who have refused to get vaccinated.

Work has been started to established and standardize at Ecma International, allow for an open interoperability ecosystem so that multiple COVID-19 immunity verification systems can work together and effectively across borders.

== See also ==
- Electronic identification
- Medical record (contains vaccination records)
- Vaccination requirements for international travel
- IATA Travel Pass app
