= Public Health (Aircraft) Regulations 1938 =

- Statutory Rules and Orders
- Parliament of the United Kingdom
- Citation: SR&O 1938/299
- Introduced by: Ministry of Health

Dates
- Commencement: 1 July 1938

Other legislation
- Made under: Public Health Act 1936

Text of the Public Health (Aircraft) Regulations 1938 as in force today (including any amendments) within the United Kingdom, from legislation.gov.uk.

The Public Health (Aircraft) Regulations 1938 (SR&O 1938/299), created by the Ministry of Health, dealt with preventing the entry of infectious diseases into Britain via aircraft, applied to all HM Customs and Excise approved airports where foreign aircraft land and came into force on 1 July 1938. They were constructed to comply with the Office International d'Hygiene's International Sanitary Convention for Aerial Navigation, first drafted in Paris in 1930. The regulations established sanitary aerodromes and its administration was the responsibility of the town councils.

== Origin ==
The Public Health (Aircraft) Regulations 1938 were constructed to comply with the Office International d'Hygiene's International Sanitary Convention for Aerial Navigation, first drafted in Paris in 1930 and then signed at The Hague on 12 April 1933. It was ratified in the UK on 15 September 1934. Each government drew up its own regulation.

== Application ==
The regulations came into force in the UK on 1 July 1938. They applied to all aerodromes approved by the Commissioners of Customs for the landing or departure of foreign aircraft. At the time 24 aerodromes were approved as "customs" aerodromes, of which four were designated as "sanitary aerodromes"; Doncaster, Croydon, Heston and Southampton.

The administration of the regulations was the responsibility of the town councils, and carried out by its medical staff under the supervision of the medical officer of health.
