= Timatic =

Passenger database for international air travel

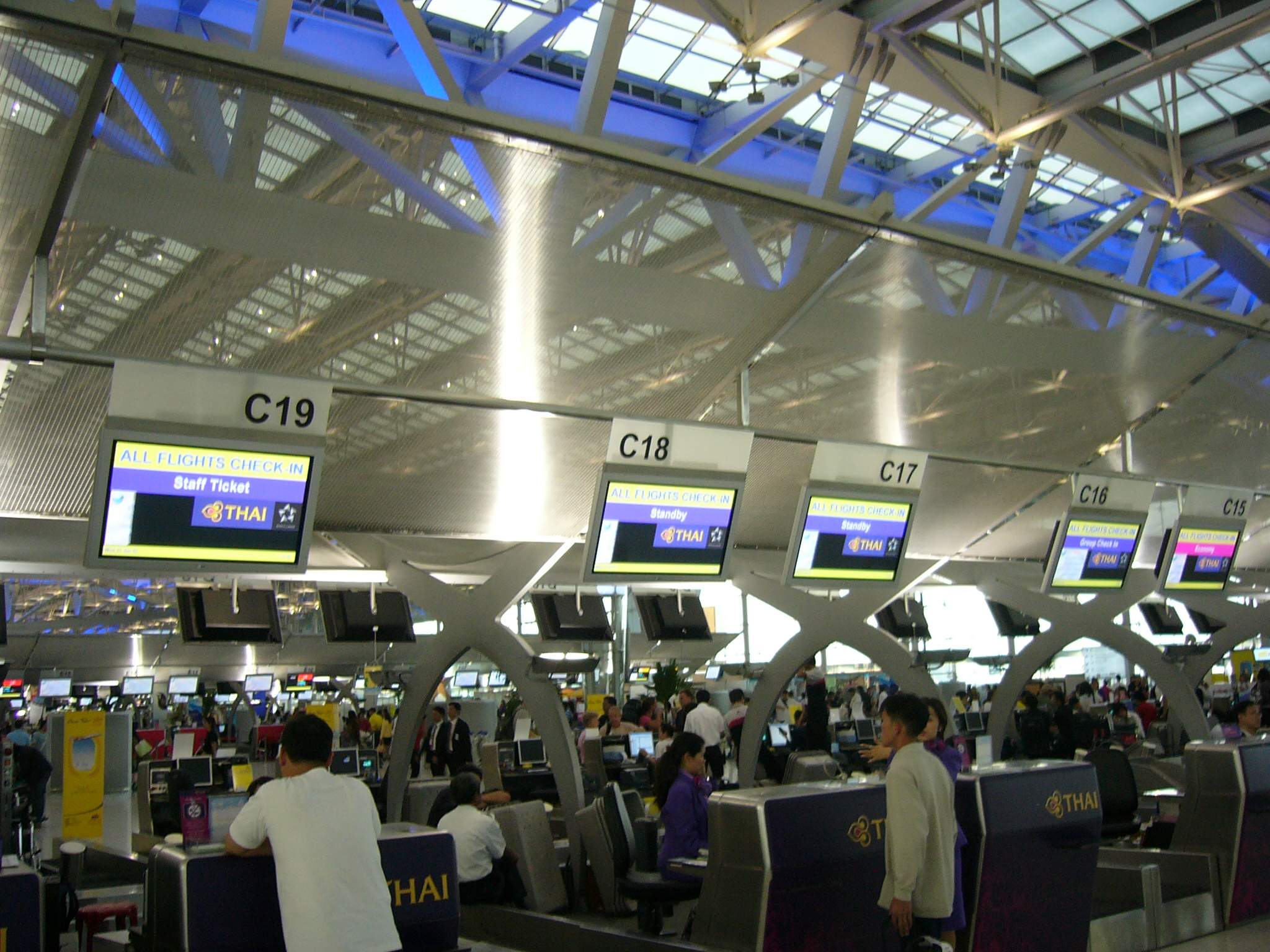
Airport check-in agents (Suvarnabhumi International Airport in Bangkok, Thailand pictured) use Timatic for verification of documentation requirements for international passengers.

The Travel Information Manual Automatic (Timatic) is a database containing documentation requirements for passengers traveling internationally via air, e.g. passport and visa requirements. Timatic is used by airlines and their representatives (check-in agents, managers, etc.), airport staff, and travel agents to determine whether a passenger can be carried, as well as by airlines and travel agents to provide this information to travellers at the time of booking. This is critical for airlines due to the fines levied by immigration authorities every time a passenger is carried who does not have the correct travel documentation, as well as the airline's costs to return the incorrectly-boarded passenger to the original airport from which the passenger departed.

The information contained in Timatic includes:

1. Passport requirements and recommendations
2. Visa requirements and recommendations
3. Health requirements and recommendations
4. Airport tax to be paid by the traveller at either departure or arrival airport
5. Customs regulations relating to import/export of goods and small pets by a passenger
6. Currency regulations relating to import and export by a passenger

Timatic was first established in 1963 and is managed by the Montreal-based International Air Transport Association (IATA). Over 500 million travellers have their documentation requirements checked against the Timatic database every year.

It is available in a number of forms, including:

1. Timatic – available via the SITA network
2. TIM – hard-copy book
3. TimaticWeb – web-based
4. Timatic XML
5. IATA Travel Centre, Consumer web portal

IATA has announced the Travel Pass application as an extension of Timatic that can manage COVID-19 test results, proof of vaccination and national entry rules.
