= Post-war aviation =

Aviation in the aftermath of World War II

The period between 1945 and 1979 is sometimes called the post-war era or the period of the post-war political consensus. During this period, aviation was dominated by the arrival of the Jet Age. In civil aviation, the jet engine allowed a huge expansion of commercial air travel, while in military aviation it led to the widespread introduction of supersonic aircraft.

By the end of the Second World War Germany and Britain already had operational jet aircraft in military service. The next few years saw jet engines being developed by all the major powers and military jet aircraft entering service with their air forces. The Soviets' most important design bureau for future jet fighter development in the decades to come, Mikoyan-Gurevich, started preparing for building swept-winged jet aircraft with the small, experimental piston-engined MiG-8 Utka pusher, which flew with slightly swept-back wings only months after V-E Day.

Supersonic flight was achieved in 1947 by the American Bell X-1 rocket plane, however the use of rocket engines would prove short lived. The development of the afterburner soon allowed jet engines to provide similar levels of thrust and longer range, while needing no oxidant and being safer to handle. The first supersonic jet to enter service was the North American F-100 Super Sabre, in 1954.

Meanwhile, commercial jetliners were being developed with the first of these, the British de Havilland Comet, first flying in 1949 and entering service in 1952. The Comet suffered from a new and unexpected problem now known as metal fatigue, several examples crashed and by the time a new version was introduced, American types such as the Boeing 707 had overtaken its design and it was not a commercial success. These types and their descendants contributed to an era of great social change, typified by popular phrases such as "the jet set" and introducing new medical syndromes such as jet lag.

The propulsive efficiency of jet engines is inversely related to the exhaust velocity. The turbofan engine improves on the propulsive efficiency of the turbojet by accelerating a larger amount of air to a lower velocity. The overall gain in efficiency increases the range and lowers the cost of operation for a given aircraft. Development had begun in both Britain and Germany during the war but the first production version, the Rolls-Royce Conway did not come into use until around 1960.

Attempts were made to develop a supersonic airliner, with the Anglo-French Concorde and Soviet Tupolev Tu-144 entering service during the 1970s, but they proved uneconomic in practice due to the high fuel consumption at supersonic speeds. The associated pollution and sonic boom from these aircraft also raised awareness of the Environmental impact of aviation, making it difficult to find countries prepared to tolerate them.

Many other advances took place during this period, such as the introduction of the helicopter, development of the fabric Rogallo wing for sport flying and the reintroduction of the canard or "tail-first" configuration by the Swedish Saab Viggen jet fighter.

== Aircraft ==
=== Supersonic flight ===
Designers already knew that as an aircraft approaches the speed of sound (Mach 1), in the transonic region, shock waves begin forming, causing a large increase in drag. Wings, already thin, had to become thinner and finer. Fineness is a measure of how thin the wing is compared to its front-to-back chord. A small, highly loaded wing has less drag and so some early types used this type, including the Bell X-1 rocket plane and the Lockheed F-104 Starfighter. But these craft had high takeoff speeds, the Starfighter causing significant pilot deaths during takeoff, and small wings fell out of use. An approach pioneered by German designers during the war was to sweep the wing at an angle, delaying the buildup of shock waves. But this made the wing structure longer and more flexible, making the aircraft more likely to suffer from bending or aeroelasticity and even causing a reversal in the action of the flight controls. Stall behaviour of the swept wing was also poorly understood and could be extremely sharp. Other problems included divergent oscillations which could build up lethal forces. In researching these effects, many pilots lost their lives, for example all three examples of the de Havilland DH.108 Swallow broke up in the air, killing their pilots. while another survived only because he lowered the seat so that, when violent oscillations developed, he did not bang his head on the canopy and break his neck.

The triangular delta wing has a swept leading edge while maintaining a sufficiently deep wing root for structural stiffness, and from the introduction of the French Dassault Mirage fighter it became a popular choice, with or without a tailplane.

But the plain delta wing proved less manoeuvrable in combat than a more conventional tapered wing, and as time progressed became more heavily modified, with tailed, cropped, double-delta, canard and other forms appearing.

As speed increases and becomes fully supersonic, the wing centre of lift moves backwards, causing a change in longitudinal trim and a pitching-down tendency known as Mach tuck. Supersonic aircraft had to be made capable of adjusting sufficiently, in order to maintain adequate control at all stages of flight.

Above speeds of around Mach 2.2 the airframe starts to heat up with the friction of the air, causing both thermal expansion and loss of strength in the cheap, easily workable light alloys used for lower speeds. Also, jet engines begin to reach their limits. The Lockheed SR-71 Blackbird was constructed of titanium alloy, had a special corrugated skin to absorb thermal expansion and dual-cycle turbofan-ramjet engines which ran on a special temperature-tolerant fuel. Mach tuck was reduced through the use of long "chine" extensions of the wing along the fuselage, which contributed greater lift at supersonic speeds.

Another problem with supersonic flight proved to be its environmental impact. A large aircraft creates a loud shock wave or "sonic boom," which can disturb or damage anything it passes over, while the high drag results in high fuel consumption and consequent pollution. These issues became highlighted with the introduction of the Concorde supersonic transport.

=== Engines ===
The propeller powered by a piston engine, in radial or inline form, still dominated aviation at the close of World War Two, and its simplicity and low cost mean it is still in use today for less demanding applications.

Some early attempts to achieve high speeds, such as the Bell X-1, used rocket engines. However a rocket engine requires an oxidant as well as a fuel, making these aircraft dangerous to handle and short-ranged. Hybrid dual-motor types such as the Saunders-Roe SR.53 used the rocket to boost speed for a "supersonic dash." In the event the development of the afterburner allowed jet engines to provide similar levels of thrust and rocket power became confined to missiles.

As the jet turbine developed, distinct types emerged. The basic jet turbine appeared in two forms, with axial or centrifugal compressors. Axial flow is theoretically more efficient and physically slimmer but requires higher technology to achieve. Consequently, early jets were of the centrifugal type. It was not long before axial-flow types came to dominate.

A variation on the turbine theme is the turbo-prop. Here, the turbine drives not only the compressor but also the main propeller. At lower speeds and altitudes this design is more efficient and economical than the jet turbine, while having greater power for less weight than a piston engine. It therefore found a niche between the low-cost piston engine and the high-performance jet engine. The Rolls-Royce Dart powered the Vickers Viscount airliner, which first flew in 1948, and turboprops remain in production today.

The next development of the jet engine was the afterburner. Pure turbojets were found to fly little faster than the speed of sound. In order to increase speed for supersonic flight, fuel was injected into the engine exhaust, upstream of a divergent nozzle similar to that seen on a rocket engine. As the fuel burned it expanded, reacting against the nozzle to drive the exhaust backwards and the engine forwards.

Turbojet engines have a high fuel consumption, and afterburning even more so. One way to make an engine more efficient is to make it pass a larger mass of air at slower speed. This led to the development of the bypass turbofan, in which a larger-diameter fan at the front passes some air into the compressor and the rest around a bypass, where it flows past the engine at slower speed than the jet exhaust. The fan and compressor need to spin at different speeds, leading to the two-spool turbofan, in which two sets of turbines are mounted on concentric shafts spinning at different speeds to drive the fan and the high-pressure compressor respectively. Taking the principle a step further, the high-bypass turbofan is even more efficient, having typically three spools each spinning at a different speed.

Another way to improve efficiency is to increase the combustion temperature. This requires improved materials able to retain their strength at high temperature, and the development of engine cores has largely followed advances in the materials available, for example through the development of precision-made ceramic parts and single-crystal metal turbine blades. Rolls-Royce developed a carbon composite fan for the Rolls-Royce RB211 turbofan but in the event found the material did not have sufficient damage tolerance and they reverted to the more conventional titanium metal.

=== Avionics ===
The advent of reliable electronics led to a progressive development of avionic systems for flight control, navigation, communication, engine control and military purposes such as target identification and weapons aiming.

New radio location systems provided navigation information which could be used to control an autopilot pre-set to fly a specific course rather than to simply maintain the present altitude and heading. Radio communications became more sophisticated, in large part to cope with increasing use as the skies became increasingly crowded.

In the military arena, Identification Friend or Foe (IFF) systems were developed, enabling military aircraft to identify each other when within firing range of their missiles but beyond visual range. Weapons aiming systems developed into fire-control systems capable of arming, launching, tracking and controlling multiple missiles at different targets. The Head-Up Display (HUD) was developed from the wartime reflector gunsight to provide key flight information to the pilot without needing to lower the eyes to the instrument panel. The increasing capability - and vulnerability - of avionics led to the development of airborne Early Warning (EW) and Electronic Countermeasures (ECM) systems.

=== Vertical takeoff (VTOL) ===
The helicopter and autogyro had both seen service in the war. Although capable of VTOL operation, rotorcraft are inefficient, expensive and slow. The Bachem Natter point-defence interceptor had used a rudimentary form of VTOL, taking off vertically under rocket power and the pilot later landing vertically by parachute while the craft fell to bits and crashed, but this was not a practical post-war solution.

Many approaches were experimented with in the post-war period, in the attempt to combine the high speed of the conventional aeroplane with the VTOL convenience of the helicopter. Only three would eventually enter production and of these only two did so during the period. The Hawker Siddeley Harrier "jump jet" achieved significant success, being manufactured in several versions and operated by the UK, USA, Spain and India, and seeing significant action in the UK-Argentina Falklands War. The Yakovlev Yak-36 went through troubling, long and expensive development, never reaching its design performance but eventually emerging as the operational Yak-38.

==== Rotorcraft ====
The first practical helicopters were developed during World War II, and many more designs appeared in the following years. For general use, the configuration developed in the US by Igor Sikorsky quickly came to dominate. Control was achieved by an articulated rotor head with cyclic and collective pitch controls, while rotor torque was counteracted by a sideways-facing tail rotor. Helicopters entered widespread use in many diverse roles including air observation, search and rescue, medical evacuation, fire fighting, construction and general transport to otherwise inaccessible locations such as mountain sides and oil rigs.

In heavy-lift applications, the tandem rotor configuration was also used with some success, for example in the Boeing Chinook series. Other twin-rotor configurations, such as intermeshing, co-axial or side-by-side also saw some use.

The autogyro, used significantly during the late 1930s and throughout the war, became relegated to private aviation and never saw wide acceptance. A Wallis example, "Little Nellie", became famous for its appearance in a James Bond film.

Another variation on the helicopter was the gyrodyne, which added a conventional propeller for forward thrust and only powered the main rotor for vertical flight. None entered production.

==== Convertiplanes ====
The convertiplane has a conventional wing for lift in forward flight and a rotary wing which acts as a lifting rotor for vertical flight and then tilts forward to act as a propeller in forward flight. In the tiltwing variant the whole wing-rotor assembly tilts while in the tiltrotor the wing remains fixed and only the engine-rotor assembly tilts. The requirements for a lifting rotor and a propulsive propeller differ, and the rotors for a convertiplane must be a compromise between the two. Some designs used what were effectively propellers rather than rotors, having a smaller diameter and being optimised for forward flight, while others chose a larger size to give better lifting power at the expense of forward speed. No convertiplane entered production during the post-war years, however the Bell Boeing V-22 Osprey tiltrotor would eventually fly in 1989, finally entering service 18 years after that.

==== Tail-sitters ====
Tail-sitters were otherwise conventional aeroplanes which sat pointing vertically up while on the ground and, after takeoff, tilted the whole aircraft horizontal to fly forwards. Early designs used propellers for thrust, while later ones used jet thrust. Problems with pilot attitude and visibility made the idea impractical.

==== Jet and fan lift ====
To use jet power for lift, the impracticality of tail-sitting meant it was necessary for the aircraft to take off and land vertically while still in a horizontal attitude. Solutions tried included lifting fans (typically buried in the wings), swivelling engine pods similar in concept to the convertiplane, dedicated lightweight lift jets or turbofans, thrust-vectoring by deflecting the jet exhaust as needed, and various combinations of these.

Only thrust-vectoring stood the test of time, with the introduction of the Rolls-Royce Pegasus bypass turbofan engine having separate vectoring nozzles for the cold fan (bypass) and hot exhaust flows, which first flew in the Hawker P.1127 VTOL research aircraft of 1960.

The success of the P.1127 and its successor the Kestrel led directly to the service introduction of the subsonic Hawker Siddeley Harrier "Jump jet" in 1969. The type was produced in several variants, notably the Sea Harrier and the McDonnell Douglas AV-8B Harrier II "big-wing" Harrier. Examples saw operational service with the UK, USA, Spain and India. The Harrier's most notable exploit was the use of Royal Navy carrier-borne Sea Harriers in the 1982 UK-Argentina Falklands War, operating in both air-to-air and air-to-ground roles.

The success of the VTOL Harrier motivated the USSR to introduce a counterpart using a combination of exhaust thrust vectoring and additional forward lift jets, the Yakovlev Yak-36 flew in 1971, later evolving into the operational Yakovlev Yak-38. Entering service in 1978, the Yak-38 was limited in both payload capability and hot-and-high performance, and saw only limited deployment.

== Civil aviation ==
=== The turbofan and cheap air travel ===
The British de Havilland Comet was the first jet airliner to fly (1949), the first in service (1952), and the first to offer a regular jet-powered transatlantic service (1958). One hundred and fourteen of all versions were built but the Comet 1 had serious design problems, and out of nine original aircraft, four crashed (one at takeoff and three broke up in flight), which grounded the entire fleet. The Comet 4 solved these problems but the program was overtaken by the Boeing 707 on the trans-Atlantic run. The Comet 4 was developed into the Hawker Siddeley Nimrod which retired in June 2011.

Following the grounding of the Comet 1, the Tu-104 became the first jet airliner to provide a sustained and reliable service, its introduction having been delayed pending the outcome of investigations into the Comet crashes. It was the world's only jet airliner in operation between 1956 and 1958 (after which the Comet 4 and Boeing 707 entered service). The plane was operated by Aeroflot (from 1956) and Czech Airlines ČSA (from 1957). ČSA became the first airline in the world to fly jet-only routes, using the Tu-104A variant.

The first western jet airliner with significant commercial success was the Boeing 707. It began service on the New York to London route in 1958, the first year that more trans-Atlantic passengers traveled by air than by ship. Comparable long-range airliner designs were the DC-8, VC10 and Il-62. The Boeing 747, the "Jumbo jet", was the first widebody aircraft that reduced the cost of flying and further accelerated the Jet Age.

One exception to the domination by turbofan engines was the turboprop-powered Tupolev Tu-114 (first flight 1957). This airliner was able to match or even exceed the performance of contemporary jets, however the use of such powerplants in large airframes was restricted to the military after 1976.

Jet airliners are able to fly much higher, faster, and further than piston‑powered propliners, making transcontinental and intercontinental travel considerably faster and easier than in the past. Aircraft making long transcontinental and trans-oceanic flights could now fly to their destinations non-stop, making much of the world accessible within a single day's travel for the first time. As demand grew, airliners became larger, further reducing the cost of air travel. People from a greater range of social classes could afford to travel outside of their own countries.

=== General aviation ===
The use of mass-production techniques similar to those of the motor industry lowered the cost of private aircraft, with types such as the Cessna 172 and Beechcraft Bonanza seeing widespread use, the 172 eclipsing even wartime production levels.

Aircraft came to be used increasingly in specialist roles such as crop spraying, policing, fire fighting, air ambulances and many others.

As helicopter technology developed, they also came into widespread use, dominated by Sikorsky's approach of a single main rotor plus tail counter-torque rotor.

Sport flying also developed, with both powered aeroplanes and gliders becoming more sophisticated. The introduction of glass fibre construction allowed sailplanes to achieve new levels of performance. In the 1960s the re-introduction of the hang-glider, now using the flexible Rogallo wing, ushered in a new era of ultralight aircraft.

The development of safe gas burners led to the re-introduction of hot air ballooning and it became a popular sport.

=== Supersonic transport ===
The introduction of the Concorde supersonic transport (SST) airliner to regular service in 1976 was expected to bring similar social changes, but the aircraft never found commercial success. After several years of service, a fatal crash near Paris in July 2000 and other factors eventually caused Concorde flights to be discontinued in 2003. This was the only loss of an SST in civilian service. Only one other SST design was used in a civilian capacity, the Soviet era Tu-144, but it was soon withdrawn due to high maintenance and other issues. McDonnell Douglas, Lockheed and Boeing were three U.S. manufacturers that had originally planned to develop various SST designs since the 1960s, but these projects were eventually abandoned for various developmental, cost, and other practical reasons.

== Military aviation ==
The years immediately following World War II saw the widespread design and introduction of military jets. Early types, such as the Gloster Meteor and Saab J 21R, were little more than WWII technology adapted for the jet engine. However the higher speeds achieved by jet-powered aircraft led to many progressive advances in design and sophistication. Machine guns and cannon were difficult to use effectively at high speed and missile armament became more common. Jets such as the Mikoyan-Gurevich MiG-15 and North American F-86 Sabre soon introduced swept wings to reduce drag at transonic speeds, and saw combat in the Korean War.

Bombers also adopted the new technologies. The increasing availability of nuclear weapons led to the introduction of nuclear-armed long-range strategic bombers such as the American Boeing B-52 and the British V-bombers. Soviet bombers continued to use turboprops for a longer period.

The first supersonic jet to enter service was the North American F-100 Super Sabre, in 1954. The delta wing was found to offer several advantages for supersonic flight and became commonplace, with or without a tail, alongside the more conventional swept wing. It offered a high fineness ratio with good structural strength for low weight, and the Dassault Mirage III and Mikoyan-Gurevich MiG-21 series of delta-winged fighters were used in large numbers.

By the time of the Vietnam War, helicopters began to take an active role in hostilities, with the introduction of the Bell "Huey" Cobra attack helicopter. Other development around this time included the swing-wing General Dynamics F-111 and the British VTOL Hawker Harrier, although these technologies were not widely deployed.

Avionics, tracking systems and battlefield communications all became increasingly sophisticated.

The arrival in 1967 of the Saab Viggen prompted a wider reappraisal aircraft design. The "canard" foreplane was found to help direct airflow over the wing, allowing flight at high angles of attack and slow speeds without stalling.

=== Missiles ===
The speed and height of jet aircraft, along with the short duration of any combat engagement, led to the widespread introduction of missiles for both offence and defence.

Airborne missiles were developed for many roles. Small heat-seeking or radar-tracking missiles were used for air-to-air combat. Larger versions were used for air-to-ground attack. The largest was their longer-range equivalent, the stand-off missile for delivery of a nuclear warhead from a safe distance.

Air defence missiles also developed, from smaller tactical anti-aircraft weapons to longer-range types designed to intercept high-altitude nuclear bombers before they entered domestic air space.

At the end of World War II missile guidance systems were crude and unreliable. Rapid advances in electronics, sensors, radar and radio communications enabled guidance systems to become more sophisticated and more reliable. Guidance systems improved or introduced after the war included radio command, TV, inertial, astro navigation, various radar modes and, for some short-range missiles, control wires. Later, laser designators manually aimed at the target came into use.

== Ground activities ==
=== Manufacturing ===
The fabrication of riveted stressed-skin aluminium airframes was widespread by the end of the Second World War, although the use of wood for private aviation continued. The pursuit of greater strength for less weight led to the introduction of advanced, and often expensive, manufacturing techniques. Key developments during the 1960s and 70s included; milling a complex part from a solid billet rather than building it up from smaller parts, the use of synthetic resin adhesives in place of rivets to avoid stress concentrations and fatigue around the rivet holes, and electron beam welding.

The development of composite materials such as fibreglass and, later, carbon fibre, freed up designers to make more fluid, aerodynamic shapes. However the unknown properties of these novel materials meant that introduction has been slow and methodical.

=== Airports ===
Many military aerodromes became civilian airports after the war, while pre-war airports reverted to their former role. The rapid growth in air travel ushered in by the jet age required an equally rapid enlargement of airport facilities worldwide.

As jet airliners grew larger and passenger numbers per flight increased, larger and more sophisticated equipment was developed for handling the aircraft, passengers and baggage.

Radar systems became commonplace, with Air traffic control facilities needed to manage the large number of aircraft in the sky at any one time.

Runways were made longer and smoother to accommodate new, larger and faster aircraft, while safety considerations and night flying led to much improved runway lighting.

Major airports became such vast and busy places that their environmental impact became substantial and the siting of any new airport, or even the expansion of an existing one, became a major social and political affair.

== See also ==
- Environmental impact of aviation
- Jet set
