= International Sanitary Convention for Aerial Navigation (1944) =

The International Sanitary Convention for Aerial Navigation (1944) was an international sanitary convention, one of the international co-operation land-marks in the history of public health, signed in Washington on 15 December 1944, and came into force on 15 January 1945.
