= Immunity passport =

Medical record for travel purposes

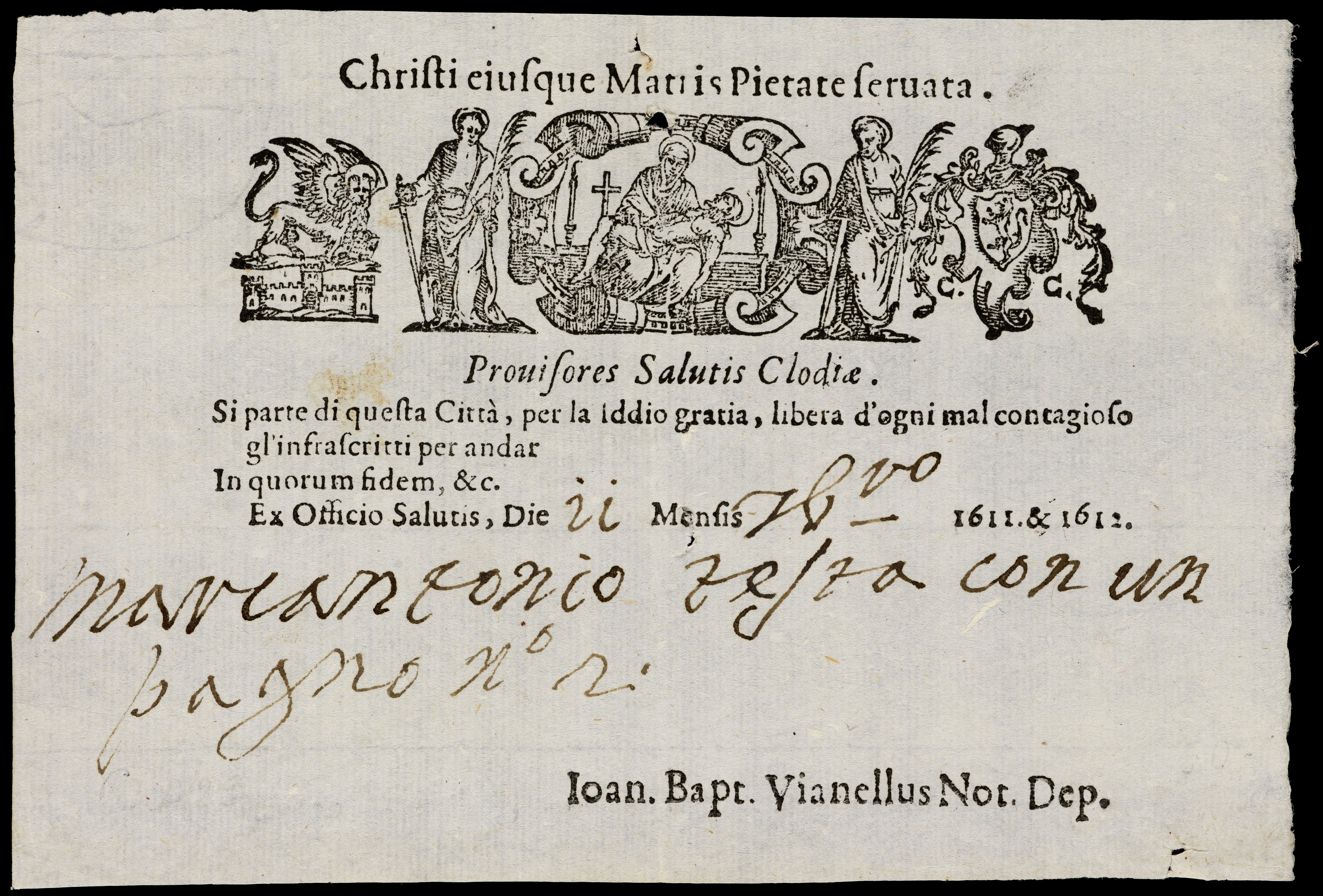
An Italian health pass (fede di sanità) for travel during times of plague, 1611

An immunity passport, immunity certificate, health pass or release certificate (among other names used by various local authorities) is a document, whether in paper or digital format, attesting that its bearer has a degree of immunity to a contagious disease. Public certification is an action that governments can take to mitigate an epidemic.

When it takes into account natural immunity or very recent negative test results, an immunity passport cannot be reduced to a vaccination record or vaccination certificate that proves someone has received certain vaccines verified by the medical records of the clinic where the vaccines were given., such as the Carte Jaune ("yellow card") issued by the World Health Organization (WHO), which works as an official vaccination record.

The concept of immunity passports received much attention during the COVID-19 pandemic as a potential way to contain the pandemic and permit faster economic recovery. Reliable serological testing for antibodies against SARS-CoV-2 virus is done to certify people as relatively immune to COVID-19 and issue immunity documentation.

== History ==
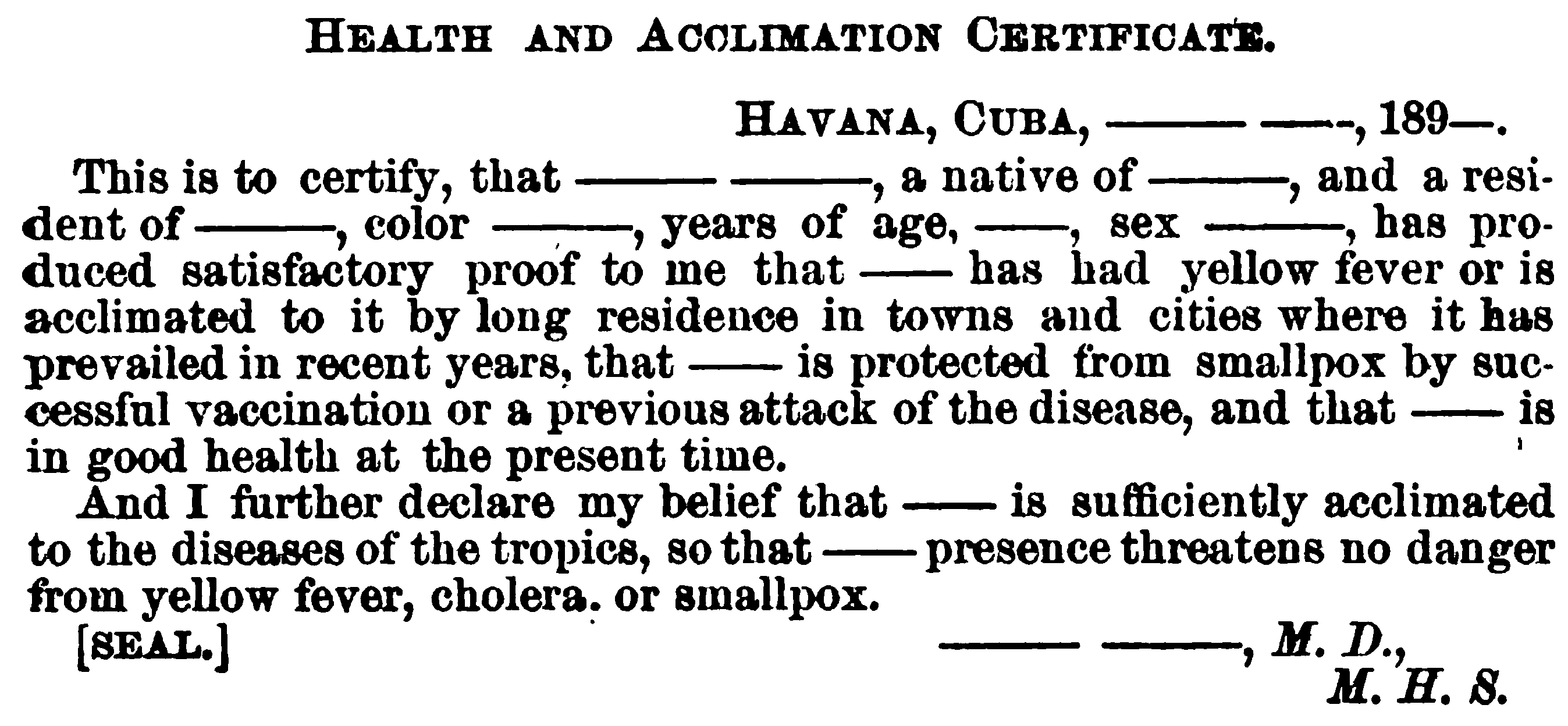
Sample of a certificate, which should, among other things, demonstrate immunity to yellow fever caused by illness. It was used for immigration to the United States in the late 19th century.

Quarantine has been used since ancient times as a method of limiting the spread of infectious disease. Consequently, there has also been a need for documents attesting that a person has completed quarantine or is otherwise known not to be infectious. One of the oldest known immunity passports, issued in 1578 in Venice, was found by Jacek Partyka, and since the 1600s, various Italian states issued fedi di sanità to exempt their bearers from quarantine.

The International Certificate of Vaccination (Carte Jaune) is a certificate of vaccination and prophylaxis, not immunity. The document has remained largely unchanged since it was adopted by the International Sanitary Convention of 1944. The certificate is most commonly associated with Yellow Fever, but it is also used to track vaccination against other illnesses.

== Modern definition ==
An immunity certificate is a legal document issued by a testing authority following a serology test demonstrating that the bearer has antibodies making them relatively immune to a disease.

These antibodies can either be produced naturally by recovering from the disease, or triggered through vaccination or another medical procedure.

Reliable immunity certificates can be used to exempt holders from quarantine and social distancing restrictions, permitting them to travel and work in most areas, including high-risk occupations such as medical care.

In the COVID-19 context, it has been argued that such certificates are of practical use to society only if all of the following conditions can be satisfied:

- Recovered or vaccinated patients have protective immunity that prevents them from being reinfected
- The protective immunity is long-lasting
- The pathogen mutates sufficiently slowly for immunity to work against most strains
- Immunity tests have low false-positive rates

However, some long-standing vaccines recommended by the World Health Organization, such as Meningococcal vaccine, are less than 100% effective and their protection is not everlasting.

== COVID-19 ==
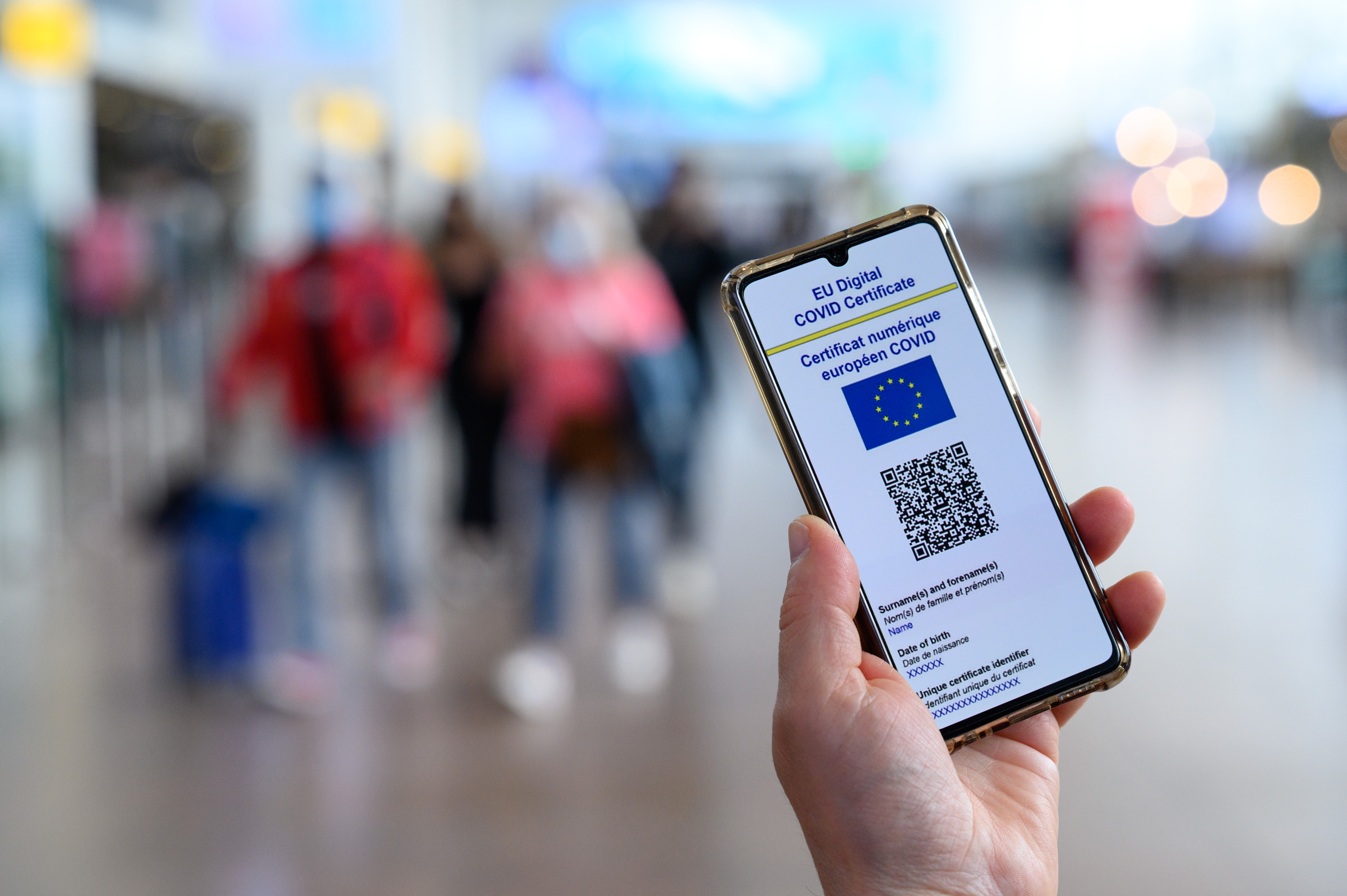
EU Digital COVID Certificate

In 2021, as COVID-19 vaccines became more publicly accessible, some governments began to authorize health credentials either as a document or in a digital form. These "vaccine passports" are used to control public access to indoor venues (like bars, restaurants, spas, and casinos) and very large gatherings (like concerts, festivals, and sporting events) and not just to facilitate travel. Depending upon the requirements of the issuing authority, an applicant would need to provide either proof of vaccination(s), a negative COVID-19 test, proof of a recovery from the virus, or some combination of these. Their usage and implementation has been controversial and has raised various scientific, medical, ethical, legal, discrimination, privacy, civil rights, and human rights concerns.

== See also ==
- Electronic health record
- Fast Healthcare Interoperability Resources
- Patient record access
- Vaccination requirements for international travel
- COVID-19 Vaccine Passport
