= Lebanese nationality law =

Lebanese Citizenship Act

Parliament of Lebanon
- Long title: An Act relating to Lebanese citizenship
- Enacted by: Government of Lebanon
- Status: Current legislation

Lebanese nationality law governs the acquisition, transmission and loss of Lebanese citizenship. Lebanese citizenship is the status of being a citizen of Lebanon and it can be obtained by birth or naturalization.

Lebanese nationality is transmitted paternally (via father) (see Jus sanguinis). Therefore, a Lebanese man who holds Lebanese citizenship can automatically confer citizenship to his children and foreign wife (only if entered in the Civil Acts Register in the Republic of Lebanon). Under the current law, descendants of Lebanese emigrants can only receive citizenship from their father and women cannot pass on citizenship to their children or foreign spouses.

This patrilineal rule is structurally linked to the census regime. This regime is based on the only nationally published census in Lebanon, dated from 1932, in which Lebanese citizenship was established. From then on, citizenship could only be passed down patrilinially, rendering men the points of reference around which female citizenship is situated. Citizens are registered by extended patriarchal family serial numbers; women are recorded as daughters of fathers or wives of husbands, and cannot head families, reproducing both nationality and sectarian affiliation through the father.

On 12 November 2015, the Parliament of Lebanon approved a draft law that would allow "foreigners of Lebanese origin to get citizenship." On 5 May 2016, the Minister of Foreign Affairs and Emigrants Gebran Bassil announced the beginning of the implementation of citizenship law for Lebanese diaspora.

== Rights and responsibilities of Lebanese citizens ==
=== Rights of citizens ===
Citizens of Lebanon have by law the legal right to:

- Live freely in Lebanon without any immigration requirements
- Gain access to free education covering primary, secondary and university education
- Receive all health-care benefits at any public health institution
- Participate in the Lebanese political system
- Benefit from the privileges of the free trade market agreements between Lebanon and many Arab countries
- Get exempted from taxes with no condition of reciprocity
- Own and inherit property and ownership rights in Lebanon
- Enter to and exit from Lebanon through any port
- Travel to and from other countries in accordance with visa requirements
- Seek consular assistance and protection abroad by Lebanon through Lebanese embassies and consulates abroad.

=== Responsibilities of citizens ===
All Lebanese citizens are required by law, when decided by the Lebanese government, to bear arms on behalf of Lebanon, to perform noncombatant service in the Lebanese Armed Forces, or to perform work of national importance under civilian direction.

== The Law ==
The law that regulates Lebanese nationality is Decree No. 15/S issued on January 15, 1925 (French: arrêté nº 15/s du 19 janvier 1925 relatif a la nationalité libanaise; Arabic: قرار رقم ١٥ تاریخ ١٩ كانون الثاني ١٩٢٥- ( مع تعديلاته) يختص بالتابعية اللبنانية).

"The main provisions of arrêté 15/S have not changed since 1925", and "there have been very few substantive developments in Lebanese citizenship law since then," despite the widely acknowledged need for them, due to political consensus-gathering difficulties. As such, the "courts have played an important role in interpreting citizenship laws." These judicial entities include, during the French mandate, the French High Commissioner; between 1940 and 1944, the Mixed Chambers of the Civil Courts; and since then, the Lebanese national courts.

== Acquisition of Lebanese citizenship ==
=== Jus sanguinis ===
A child born to a Lebanese father or whose paternity has been declared acquires Lebanese citizenship by descent, irrespective of the nationality of the mother, and irrespective of her marital status.

A child whose Lebanese citizenship depends on paternal links loses citizenship when those are cut.

However, if a woman citizen gives birth and nobody claims paternity over the child, the child in question can be incorporated into the maternal grandfather’s family serial number (thus be assigned to his personal status and sect) and consequently be eligible for citizenship.

=== By marriage ===
A foreign woman who marries a Lebanese man may apply for Lebanese citizenship after having been married for at least one year and their marriage has been entered in the Civil Acts Register in the Republic of Lebanon. No language test is required, but the wife must show integration into the Lebanese way of life, compliance with the Lebanese rule of law and that she poses no danger to Lebanon's internal or external security.

A foreign wife of a Lebanese citizen can apply for naturalization while resident overseas after one year of marriage to a husband who is a Lebanese citizen, and close ties to Lebanon.

The non-Lebanese husband cannot acquire Lebanese citizenship by marriage to a Lebanese woman. The only known exception to the above rule is the president of FIFA Gianni Infantino, who is married to Leena Al Ashqar from Lebanon through whom he holds Lebanese citizenship. It has been argued that to enable the Lebanese wife to pass Lebanese citizenship to a non-Lebanese husband would lead to a flood of Palestinians acquiring citizenship, upsetting the delicate demographics in the country. This demographic anxiety is amplified by so-called "sextarianism", where nationality law intersects with sectarian power-sharing and census practices that freeze regional origins and patrilineal sect transmission; reforms are framed as threats to Christian representation amid Palestinian and Syrian refugee populations.

The discriminatory provisions of Lebanese citizenship laws against women, specifically in terms of transmitting citizenship to spouses and children, serve mainly to bar Syrian and Palestinian refugees in Lebanon to acquire citizenship for them and their kids, and therefore changing the demographics in Lebanon, heavily based on religious affiliation. In both Islam and Christianity, the kids inherit their father’s religion. In Lebanon, the political scene is heavily dependent on religious affiliation.

=== Birth in Lebanon ===
Birth in Lebanon does not, in itself, generally confer Lebanese citizenship. However, jus soli applies in certain cases, under article 1, clauses 2 and 3, of decree 15/S of 1925. Anyone born in Lebanon, to unknown parents or to parents of unknown nationality, or born in Lebanon and who did not acquire another nationality at birth, is a Lebanese national.

=== Naturalization ===
Lebanese citizenship can be acquired through naturalization only if the person has applied for, and been granted, a Decree from the Lebanese Council of Ministers. Foreign spouses of Lebanese women are not eligible for naturalization.

== Loss of Lebanese citizenship ==
Article 8 of Decree No. 15 states how one ceases to be Lebanese:

By accepting public employment from a foreign country and failing to resign, despite been instructed to do so, in a set amount of time, by the Lebanese government.

Lebanese citizenship can be renounced if the Lebanese government first approves the acquisition of a foreign citizenship and then approves the renunciation of Lebanese citizenship.

== Dual citizenship ==
According to the Lebanese Ministry for Migration, there have been no restrictions on multiple citizenship in Lebanon since 1 January 1926, and foreigners who acquire Lebanese citizenship and Lebanese citizens who voluntarily acquire another citizenship retain their Lebanese citizenship (subject to the laws of the other country), as was the case before that date.

Since the nationality laws of most countries now allow both parents to transmit their nationality to their common child (and not only the father, as used to often be the case), many children automatically acquire multiple citizenship at birth. However, Lebanon specially notes that this has not created any practical problems. Military service, the most likely problem to arise, is usually done in the country where the person resides at the time of conscription. For instance, a dual Lebanese-Armenian national must do his military service in Armenia, since Armenia has compulsory military service for two years for males from 18 to 27 years old. All male dual citizens regardless where they live are required to serve in the military as if they were Armenian resident citizen with certain exceptions. Most male Armenian citizens living outside of Armenia do not return to serve in the military.

Until 2007, military service in Lebanon was mandatory for men only. All men were required to do a one-year military service through age 18+. Training was only done whenever they had free time or time off school including summer vacations and holidays. There was also training done alongside high school. On 4 May 2005, a new conscription system was adopted, making for a six-month service, and pledging to end conscription within two years. As of 10 February 2007 mandatory military service no longer exists in Lebanon.

Even though Lebanese nationality law permits multiple citizenship, a Lebanese national who also holds another country's citizenship may be required to renounce the foreign citizenship, under the foreign country's nationality law. A dual Lebanese-Japanese national must, for instance, make a declaration of choice, to the Japanese Ministry of Justice, before turning 22, as to whether he or she wants to keep the Lebanese or Japanese citizenship.

== Reforms ==
There is a public demand for giving the opportunity for Lebanese women to transmit their Lebanese nationality to their children and also to their husbands, and for Lebanese citizenship to be given to the 8-14 million Lebanese diasporas around the world. Women's rights activists have long campaigned to amend nationality law to allow transmission to children and spouses, framing it as a constitutional equality issue. However, opposition invoke sectarian balance, with the 1932 census's frozen demographics underpinning fears that naturalizing children of Lebanese women (especially those married to Palestinian or Syrian men) would shift sectarian quotas.

On 7 November 2015, Gebran Bassil, the Minister of Foreign Affairs and Emigrants, "refused to compromise on a draft law that would grant citizenship to the descendants of Lebanese expatriates by expanding it to include the foreign spouses and children of Lebanese women".

On 11 November 2015, the Lebanese Parliament and Free Patriotic Movement member Ibrahim Kanaan stated that the ministers have agreed to pass a "10-article draft law titled “The Reacquisition of Lebanese Citizenship to the Descendants of Lebanese Emigrants,” to grant those of Lebanese origin the nationality on the basis of certain procedures and legal pathways.

On 12 November 2015, the Lebanese Parliament approved a raft of draft laws, including a law allowing foreigners of Lebanese origin to get citizenship.

On 5 May 2016, the Gebran Bassil, the Minister of Foreign Affairs and Emigrants announced the beginning of the implementation of citizenship law for Lebanese diaspora. However, the law would allow only grandchildren of Lebanese paternal grandfathers but not grandchildren of Lebanese maternal grandmothers to apply for citizenship.

=== Law for descendants of Lebanese origin ===
Article I

Every natural person who meets one of the two eligibility requirements has the right to reclaim his/her Lebanese nationality.

- 1- If the records of the 1921 census at the Ministry of the Interior and Municipalities, and the records of emigration clearly indicate that he/she or any direct paternal ancestral/predecessors or next of kin to the fourth degree were present in the Republic of Lebanon, as registered by the 1921 census records at the Ministry of the Interior and Municipalities (that will prove the emigration to a direct paternal/ancestral predecessor.
- 2- If he/she or the above-mentioned ancestral predecessors or next of kin were naturalized as Lebanese citizens according to the law of naturalization promulgated on January 19, 1925, and has neglected to claim or reclaim his/her citizenship. In other words, most emigrants required little more than their emigration papers that listed origins.

Article II

This law intends to verify the “actual presence of Lebanese relatives in the town, village or neighborhood,” which an individual would claim, including the degree of kinship, along with any ownership/holding of rights to real property that may have been “devised, bequeathed, or inherited from a Lebanese citizen.”

I swear by Almighty God that I have decided to reclaim my Lebanese nationality entirely of my own free will

Although bureaucratic in nature, this aspect of the law was meant to encourage associations with the land, a defining feature of Lebanese nationality. Where one traced his/her roots were deemed vital that, again, added a specific feature to the law. The law would allow grandchildren of Lebanese paternal grandfathers to apply for citizenship. The latest law would help Lebanese expatriates take part in future Lebanese parliamentary elections by voting at Lebanese embassies abroad. The number of Lebanese living outside the country is thought to at least double the number of citizens living inside, which means at least 8 million people.

== Refugees in Lebanon ==
Strict restrictions are in place on granting of Lebanese citizenship due to the importance of the country's demographics in the political system. However, Armenian and Assyrian refugees came to Lebanon in 1915 from present-day southeastern Turkey, following the Armenian and Assyrian genocide. And when Lebanon was formed after Ottoman rule subsided, these Armenians and Assyrians were given citizenship to Lebanon. Also, under the Syrian-occupied Lebanon in 1994, the government naturalized over 154,931 foreign residents, of mainly Syrian (mostly Syrian Sunnis and Christians) and Palestinian (of The Seven Villages, mostly Shia Muslims) descent. It was argued that the purpose of these naturalizations was to sway the elections to a pro-Syrian government. This allegation is based on how these new citizens were bussed in to vote and displayed higher voting rates than the nationals did.

Most Palestinians in Lebanon do not have Lebanese citizenship and therefore do not have Lebanese identity cards, are legally barred from owning property or legally barred from entering a list of desirable occupations. However, some Palestinians, mostly Palestinian Christians, did receive Lebanese citizenship, either through marriage with Lebanese nationals or by other means. In 2017, a census by the Lebanese government counted 174,000 Palestinians in Lebanon, but other sources estimate the number as high as 400,000.

On 1 June 2018, the notoriously anti-naturalization Lebanese president, Michel Aoun signed a naturalization decree granting citizenship to a reported 300 individuals. These individuals come for various backgrounds and religions, however all of them are in one way wealthy and have ties to former Syrian president, Bashar al-Assad.

== See also ==
- Constitution of Lebanon
- Driving licence in Lebanon
- Foreign relations of Lebanon
- History of Lebanon
- Lebanese diaspora
- Lebanese identity card
- Lebanese passport
- Politics of Lebanon
- Vehicle registration plates of Lebanon
- Visa policy of Lebanon
- Visa requirements for Lebanese citizens
