= Constitution of Lebanon =

The Constitution of Lebanon was adopted on 23 May 1926. Initiated during the French Mandate, it established a governance model based on confessionalism to accommodate Lebanon's religious communities.

Drafted with contributions from prominent figures and drawing inspiration from the French Third Republic, the constitution enshrined principles of liberty, equality, and religious freedom while instituting a system that allocated political representation and power based on religious affiliation. This included an equal division of legislative seats between Christians and Muslims, with further proportional distribution among their sects.

Post-independence, the constitution underwent significant modifications, highlighted by changes including the 1943 National Pact and further refined by the 1989 Taif Agreement, with the latter aimed at resolving the 15-year Lebanese Civil War.

== Background ==
Prior to its collapse at the end of the First World War, the area that is now Lebanon was part of the Ottoman Empire. In the 19th century, the empire had experimented with constitutionalism with the Ottoman Constitution of 1876. This constitution was an effort to modernize the empire and was part of a series of modernizations known as the Tanzimat. However, Mount Lebanon was an exception to the Ottoman constitution due to its status given by foreign powers, and did not participate in the “constitutional experiments” of the late 19th and early 20th centuries.

The French Mandate of Lebanon was established in 1920. As a Mandate, the goal of French control of the region was to prepare the nation for full autonomy, which would be accomplished partly by the writing of a constitution. Lebanon itself, though independent by name after the adoption of the constitution in 1926, remained under French control until 1943. Confessionalism has been a part of the government in Lebanon since the time of the Ottomans, with a multi-confessional Administrative Council being established on Mount Lebanon in the 1860’s. Confessionalism was extended into the greater Lebanon area under the control of the French, who saw confessionalism as a method to maintain peace between the people and to represent the population’s identities. In 1925, French Mandate authorities began the process for writing a constitution. The process for the constitution involved negotiation between two parties, neither of which entirely supported a nation of Greater Lebanon: Christian isolationists wanted to establish a majority Christian nation, while Muslim unionists wanted to combine with Syria. The French, however, pushed for a multi-confessional state which would prevail and become enshrined in the constitution. Muslim Representatives would continue to reject the constitution and push for union with Syria until a 1936 treaty between France and Syria made it so Syria would give up all land claims it had in Lebanon.

Because of the involvement of the French High Commissioner in the writing of the Constitution, the document had many French influences. The structure is based on the constitution for the Third Republic of France, establishing secularism in the government as well as the separation of church and state.

The Constitution was adopted by the Lebanese representative Council on May 23, 1926.

== Changes and amendments ==
In 1927, the Senate, originally a part of a bi-cameral legislative body along with the Chamber of Deputies, was abolished.

Just before Lebanon would gain full independence from France, a verbal agreement was made between the Christian president, Bechara al-Khouri, and the Muslim prime minister, Riad al-Solh. This is known as the 1943 National Pact. This agreement determined that the Muslims would stop their push for unity with Syria and the Christians would give up their “western tutelage” as well as bringing about an end to the French Mandate. As well the ratio of representation in parliament was formalized in the constitution to be 6:5, Christian to Muslim soon after.

In 1947, representation in the government was given to Shi'ite Muslims in the form of the seat of Speaker of Parliament. This position is notably weaker than the other two positions of the Troika, made up of the president, prime minister, and Speaker of Parliament, with a two-year term in comparison to the six-year terms of the president and prime minister.

The most recent major amendments to the Constitution was for the Charter of Lebanese National Reconciliation (Ta'if Accord), in October 1989 that was signed into law on the 21st September 1990. This brought an end to the Lebanese Civil War that began in 1975. The Ta'if Accord introduced multiple changes to the constitution, including shifting the ratio of religious representation from a 6:5 Christian majority to 1:1 and a reduction in the powers of the president. The Ta'if Accords also shifted the centers of power within the government, with Lebanon being run by the Troika, a group of three who act as the executive branch. The Troika consists of a Maronite Christian president, a Sunni Muslim prime minister, and a Shi’ite Muslim Speaker of Parliament.

== Structure of government ==
The government consists of three branches: the Legislative Branch, the Executive Branch, and the Judicial Branch.

=== Legislative Branch ===
The Chamber of Deputies (House of Deputies) serves as the main legislative body in Lebanon. They have the power to ratify international treaties involving trade, approving the annual budget, and the power to legislate. This body also elects the president of the republic. The House of Deputies meets in two sessions a year, and consists of 128 members, half of whom are Christian, the other half Muslim.

=== Executive Branch ===
The Executive Branch consists of the president of the republic, the prime minister, and the Council of Ministers.

==== President ====
The president is the ceremonial head of state and commander in chief of the military. When elected, the president will serve a six-year term and may not be re-elected for consecutive terms. The president has the power to appoint the prime minister, propose legislation, negotiate international treaties, and to dissolve the Parliament. After the 1943 National Pact, it was determined that the president of the Republic could only be Maronite Christian.

==== Prime minister ====
The role of the prime minister in the constitution is brief compared to that of the president. But the constitution establishes the prime minister as the head of government and “presides over the House of Ministers”. The prime minister has the power to cosign presidential decrees, represent the Cabinet in front of Parliament, among other small roles. The prime minister was determined to always be a Sunni Muslim after the 1943 National Pact.

==== Council of Ministers ====
The Council of Ministers, or the Cabinet to the president, holds the executive power in the Lebanese government. They have the power to ratify international treaties, enforce laws, declare war, among other powers. For much of these powers to be used, two-thirds of the Council must be present.

=== Judicial Branch ===
Article 20 of the constitution addresses the establishment of the judicial branch. It established that judicial power is in the “courts of various degrees and jurisdictions”. The judgements and functions of these courts are to be determined by the law.

== Articles ==
The constitution describes the flag of Lebanon. The original version of Article 5 read "The Lebanese flag is blue, white, red with a cedar in the white part". A change made on 7 December 1943 indicated that "The Lebanese flag is made of red, white and red horizontal stripes, with the cedar in green in the centre of the white stripe". Some flag manufacturers have created a more conventional looking tree, with a brown trunk. Some allege that this is unconstitutional.

Article 11, on the Official National Language, declares that "Arabic is the official national language. A law determines the cases in which the French language may be used."

In an attempt to maintain equality between Christians and Muslims, Article 24 of the constitution mandates the distribution of offices on the basis of Confessionalism as an interim measure, but does not specify how they are to be allocated. (See National Pact) It does, nevertheless, specify that half the seats shall be given to Christians and half to Muslims. Article 24 in its entirety reads as follows.

Until such time as the Chamber enacts new electoral laws on a non-confessional basis, the distribution of seats shall be according to the following principles:

1. Equal representation between Christians and Muslims.
2. Proportional representation among the confessional groups within each of the two religious communities.
3. Proportional representation among geographic regions.

Exceptionally, and for one time only, the seats that are currently vacant, as well as the new seats that have been established by law, shall be filled by appointment, all at once, and by a two thirds majority of the Government of National Unity. This is to establish equality between Christians and Muslims as stipulated in the Document of National Accord. The electoral laws shall specify the details regarding the implementation of this clause.

== Research ==
A scholarly reference book on the Lebanese Constitution, describing its history and citing its full text as well as all its amendments was published in 1968 by Shafik Jiha and Wadih Chbat.

== See also ==
- Driving licence in Lebanon
- History of Lebanon
- Lebanese diaspora
- Lebanese identity card
- Lebanese nationality law
- Lebanese passport
- Politics of Lebanon
- Vehicle registration plates of Lebanon
- Visa policy of Lebanon
- Visa requirements for Lebanese citizens
