= Visa policy of Lebanon =

Policy on permit required to enter Lebanon

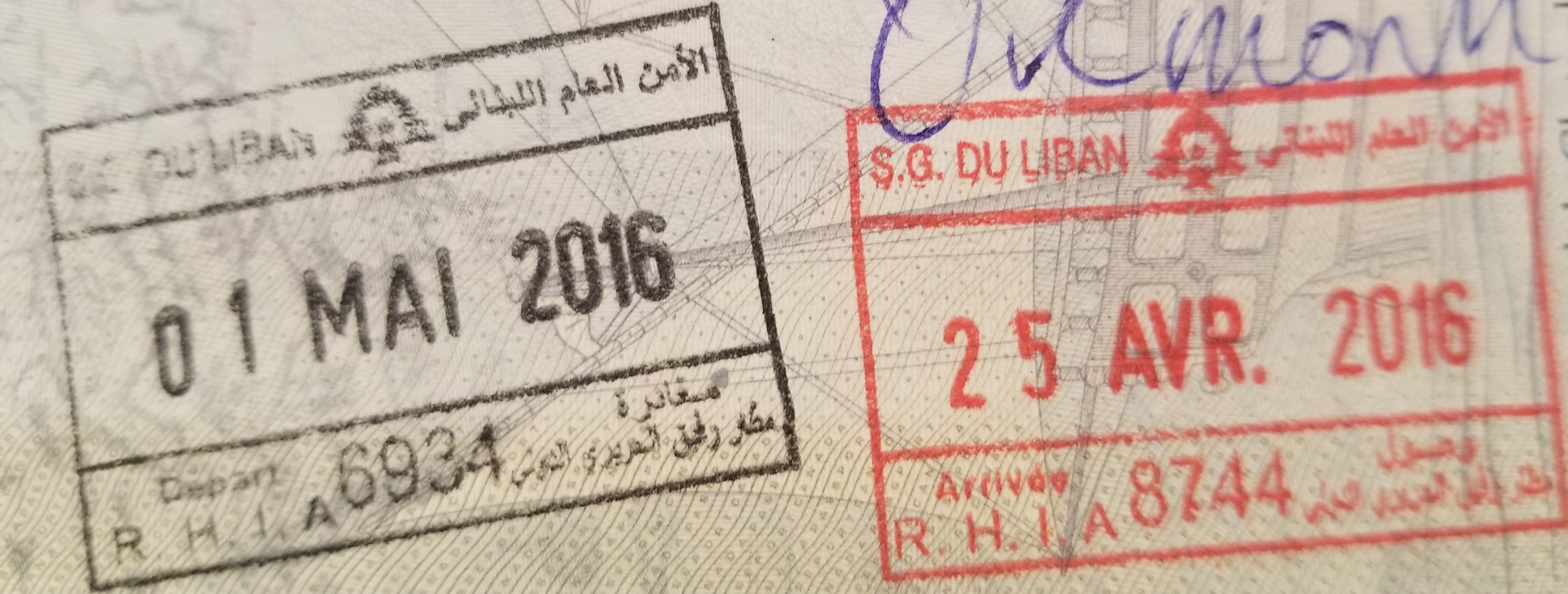
Lebanese Visa stamps in a Canadian passport

Visitors to Lebanon must obtain a visa from one of the diplomatic missions of Lebanon unless they are citizens from one of the visa-exempt countries or citizens who may obtain a visa on arrival.

Citizens of member nations of the Gulf Cooperation Council (GCC) may travel to Republic of Lebanon without visa limits for a maximum stay of 6 months per calendar year while Citizens of Jordan may do the same but for a maximum stay of 3 months per 6-month period.

Citizens of eligible countries and territories are granted a visa on arrival for a maximum stay of one month, extendable for 2 additional months at Beirut International Airport or any other port of entry if they are holding a telephone number, an address in the Republic of Lebanon, a non-refundable return or circle trip ticket, and there are no Israeli stamps, visas, or seals on their passport.

All visitors must hold a passport valid for three months beyond the period of intended stay and with 2 blank pages.

Visa runs are not allowed, meaning that if foreigners wish to re-enter the Republic of Lebanon after their visa-free or VoA period has expired they should obtain a visa.

== Visa policy map ==
Visa policy of Lebanon Lebanon Visa not required (6 months) Visa not required (3 months) Free visa on arrival Visa on arrival (conditions apply) Visa required Visa required with an immigration approval Admission refused

== As of right ==
The following citizens do not require a visa to enter, reside, study, and work indefinitely in the Republic of Lebanon without any immigration requirements:

- (Lebanon) Lebanese citizens (Note: May enter with a national identity card, individual civil status record, expired passport or civil extract issued by the Republic of Lebanon to passengers of Lebanese descent holding a foreign passport.)
- Holders of a travel document (Titre de Voyage) issued by the Republic of Lebanon to stateless persons and refugees, including their wife and children with proof thereof.

== Visa exemption ==
=== Ordinary passports ===
Citizens of the following countries and territories may enter Lebanon without a visa at any port of entry if they are holding a telephone number, an address in the Republic of Lebanon, a non-refundable return or circle trip ticket, and there are no Israeli stamps, visas, or seals on their passport.

6 months within any 1 year

- Bahrain
- Kuwait
- Oman
- Qatar
- Saudi Arabia
- United Arab Emirates

3 months within any 6 months

- Jordan

=== Non-ordinary passports ===
- A visa is not required for travelers of Lebanese origins traveling with any foreign passport and with a valid Lebanese national identity card, an expired Lebanese passport or a Lebanese civil document are exempted from visa requirements and admitted as citizens of the Republic of Lebanon.
- A visa is not required for holders of diplomatic, official, service or special passports issued by Armenia for a maximum stay of 180 days per calendar year if they are holding a telephone number, an address in the Republic of Lebanon, a non-refundable return or circle trip ticket, and there are no Israeli stamps, visas, or seals on their passport.
- A visa is not required for holders of diplomatic, official, service or special passports issued by Brazil and Cuba for a maximum stay of three months per calendar year if they are holding a telephone number, an address in the Republic of Lebanon, a non-refundable return or circle trip ticket, and there are no Israeli stamps, visas, or seals on their passport.
- A visa is not required for holders of diplomatic, official or service passports issued by Colombia for a maximum stay of three months if they are holding a telephone number, an address in the Republic of Lebanon, a non-refundable return or circle trip ticket, and there are no Israeli stamps, visas, or seals on their passport. This can be renewed once within one year.
- A visa is not required for holders of diplomatic, official or service passports issued by Cyprus and Venezuela for a maximum stay of 90 days if they are holding a telephone number, an address in the Republic of Lebanon, a non-refundable return or circle trip ticket, and there are no Israeli stamps, visas, or seals on their passport.
- A visa is not required for holders of diplomatic passports only issued by Hungary, Malta, Liechtenstein and Switzerland for a maximum stay of 90 days if they are holding a telephone number, an address in the Republic of Lebanon, a non-refundable return or circle trip ticket, and there are no Israeli stamps, visas, or seals on their passport.
- A visa is not required for holders of diplomatic, official, service or special passports issued by Greece and Kyrgyzstan (not assigned to a diplomatic mission or consular office of Kyrgyzstan in Lebanon) for three months within six-month period if they are holding a telephone number, an address in the Republic of Lebanon, a non-refundable return or circle trip ticket, and there are no Israeli stamps, visas, or seals on their passport.
- A visa is not required for holders of diplomatic, official, service or special passports issued by Kazakhstan (not assigned to a diplomatic mission or consular office of Kazakhstan in Lebanon) for one month within 180-day period if they are holding a telephone number, an address in the Republic of Lebanon, a non-refundable return or circle trip ticket, and there are no Israeli stamps, visas, or seals on their passport.
- A visa is not required for a maximum stay of 24 hours for holders of a travel document (Titre de Voyage) issued by Syria to stateless persons and refugees holding a residence permit issued by a third country, continuing to Syria, and have previously traveled out of Beirut.
- A visa is not required for all Merchant Seamen who are citizens of Bahrain, Kuwait, Oman, Qatar, Saudi Arabia, and the United Arab Emirates but must hold a Seaman Book and Letter of Employment or Letter or Guarantee from the shipping company if arriving by air in order to board a ship, or if arriving by ship in order to board an aircraft and are holding a telephone number, an address in the Republic of Lebanon, a non-refundable return or circle trip ticket, and there are no Israeli stamps, visas, or seals on their passport.
- A visa is not required for United Nations' staff provided holding a diplomatic card issued by the Ministry of Foreign Affairs of the Republic of Lebanon for a maximum stay of 6 months per year, and are holding a telephone number, an address in the Republic of Lebanon, a non-refundable return or circle trip ticket, and there are no Israeli stamps, visas, or seals on their passport.
- A visa is not required for holders of a Laissez-Passer issued by the United Nations and are travelling on duty if they are holding a telephone number, an address in the Republic of Lebanon, a non-refundable return or circle trip ticket, and there are no Israeli stamps, visas, or seals on their passport.
- A visa is not required for Members of the Deterrent, Emergency, UN Interim (UNIFIL) and UN Security Forces provided holding Military Identity Cards for a maximum stay of 6 months per year if they are holding a telephone number, an address in the Republic of Lebanon, a non-refundable return or circle trip ticket, and there are no Israeli stamps, visas, or seals on their passport.

=== Future changes ===
Lebanon has signed visa exemption agreements with the following countries, but they have not yet been ratified:

Country	Passports	Agreement signed on
Seychelles	All	21 November 2024

== Visa on arrival ==
=== Free visa on arrival ===
Holders of ordinary passports of the following countries and territories may enter Lebanon with a free visa on arrival for a maximum stay of 1 month at Beirut International Airport or any other port of entry if they are holding a telephone number, an address in the Republic of Lebanon, a non-refundable return or circle trip ticket, and there are no Israeli stamps, visas, or seals on their passport. Extension of stay is possible for an additional 2 months.

- All European Union member states

- Andorra
- Antigua and Barbuda
- Argentina
- Armenia
- Australia
- Azerbaijan
- Bahamas
- Barbados
- Belarus
- Belize
- Bhutan
- Brazil
- Canada
- Chile
- China
- Costa Rica
- Dominican Republic
- Georgia
- Hong Kong
- Iceland
- Iraq
- Japan
- Kazakhstan
- Kyrgyzstan
- Liechtenstein
- Macao
- Malaysia
- Mexico
- Moldova
- Monaco
- Montenegro
- New Zealand
- North Macedonia
- Norway
- Panama
- Paraguay
- Peru
- Russia
- Saint Kitts and Nevis
- Samoa
- San Marino
- Serbia
- Singapore
- South Korea
- Switzerland
- Tajikistan
- Turkmenistan
- Turkey
- Ukraine
- United Kingdom
- United States
- Uzbekistan
- Vatican City
- Venezuela

- Visa is granted on arrival for holders of official, service and special passport holders of Malaysia, the Philippines, and Singapore for a maximum stay of 1 month at Beirut International Airport or any other port of entry if they are holding a telephone number, an address in the Republic of Lebanon, a non-refundable return or circle trip ticket, and there are no Israeli stamps, visas, or seals on their passport. Extension of stay is possible for an additional 2 months.
- Visa on arrival for diplomatic passport holders issued by any country with formal relations with the Republic of Lebanon if they are holding a telephone number, an address in the Republic of Lebanon, a non-refundable return or circle trip ticket, and there are no Israeli stamps, visas, or seals on their passport.

=== Conditional Visa On Arrival ===
Citizens of the following countries and territories may obtain a visa on arrival at Beirut International Airport or any other port of entry if they are holding a copy of a reservation in a 3 to 5 star hotel or private residential address with telephone number in the Republic of Lebanon, at least 2,000 USD in cash, a non-refundable return or circle trip ticket, and there are no Israeli stamps, visas, or seals on their passport.

- Algeria
- Comoros
- Côte d'Ivoire
- Djibouti
- Egypt
- Ghana
- Libya
- Mauritania
- Morocco
- Nigeria
- Somalia
- Sudan
- Syria (Note: Conditions apply)
- Tunisia
- Yemen

- Visa is granted on arrival for spouses and children is they are travelling on a foreign passport and are accompanied by at least one Lebanese spouse or parent holding a Lebanese Passport or a Lebanese ID card. This however, does not apply for Palestinian refugees born to Lebanese mothers.
- Visa is granted on arrival for a maximum stay of 11 months for Businessmen, Directors, General Managers, Employers, Physicians, Engineers and Lawyers possessing a valid residence permit in any of the Gulf Cooperation Council Countries, if that the term of the granted visa doesn't exceed the validity of the concerned person's passport and residence. The airlines companies are in charge of checking the residence's validity prior to boarding. As for the wives and children of this category, they are granted visas according to the conditions concerning the entry of individuals of same nationalities in case that they do not possess a valid residence in one of the Gulf Countries and are telephone number, an address in the Republic of Lebanon, a non-refundable return or circle trip ticket, and there are no Israeli stamps, visas, or seals on their passport.
- Visa is granted on arrival for tourist groups composed of a minimum of eight people for stays of more than 3 days if being sponsored by a registered tour operator in the Republic of Lebanon having sent their application at least 2 days prior to arrival for a maximum stay of 6 months at Beirut International Airport or any other port of entry if they are holding a telephone number, an address in the Republic of Lebanon, a non-refundable return or circle trip ticket, and there are no Israeli stamps, visas, or seals on their passport.
- Visa is granted on arrival for holders of a written confirmation issued by the General Directorate of General Security that the visa has been approved before departure at Beirut International Airport or any other port of entry if they are holding a telephone number, an address in the Republic of Lebanon, a non-refundable return or circle trip ticket, and there are no Israeli stamps, visas, or seals on their passport
- Visa is granted on arrival for maids of those accredited to citizens of the Republic of the Republic of Lebanon for a maximum stay of 6 months at Beirut International Airport or any other port of entry if they are travelling with their sponsor, and are holding a telephone number, an address in the Republic of Lebanon, a non-refundable return or circle trip ticket, and there are no Israeli stamps, visas, or seals on their passport.
- Visa is granted on arrival for holders of passports issued by Syria for a maximum stay of 48 hours at Beirut International Airport or any other port of entry if passing through the Republic of Lebanon on their way to Syria and there are no Israeli stamps, visas, or seals on their passport.
- Visa is granted on arrival for holders of passports issued by Syria for a maximum stay of the duration of the pre-arranged hotel accommodation Beirut International Airport or any other port of entry if they are holding a cash amount equivalent to the sum of one thousand US Dollars or an authentic cheque of the same value from a recognized bank, a proof of pre-arranged hotel accommodation, a family book if accompanied by family members, a telephone number, an address in the Republic of Lebanon, a non-refundable return or circle trip ticket, and there are no Israeli stamps, visas, or seals on their passport.
- Visa is granted on arrival for holders of passports issued by Syria for a maximum stay of 1 month at Beirut International Airport or any other port of entry if they are holding a proof of business or occupation, a letter of invitation/guarantee issued by an inviting party, a family book if accompanied by family members, a telephone number, an address in the Republic of Lebanon, a non-refundable return or circle trip ticket, and there are no Israeli stamps, visas, or seals on their passport.
- Visa is granted on arrival for holders of passports issued by Syria for a maximum stay of 6 months at Beirut International Airport or any other port of entry if they are holding a proof of property, a family book if accompanied by family members, a telephone number, an address in the Republic of Lebanon, a non-refundable return or circle trip ticket, and there are no Israeli stamps, visas, or seals on their passport.
- Visa is granted on arrival for holders of passports issued by Syria for a maximum stay of 72 hours at Beirut International Airport or any other port of entry, if they are travelling on business and are holding medical reports/certificates of treatment/condition, a family book if accompanied by family members, a telephone number, an address in the Republic of Lebanon, a non-refundable return or circle trip ticket, and there are no Israeli stamps, visas, or seals on their passport.
- Visa is granted on arrival for holders of passports issued by Syria for a maximum stay of 48 hours at Beirut International Airport or any other port of entry, if they are visiting a foreign embassy and are holding proof of scheduled appointment, a family book if accompanied by family members, a telephone number, an address in the Republic of Lebanon, a non-refundable return or circle trip ticket, and there are no Israeli stamps, visas, or seals on their passport.
- Visa is granted on arrival for holders of passports issued by Syria for a maximum stay of 7 days at Beirut International Airport or any other port of entry if they are travelling to study in an accredited school or university and are holding a letter of acceptance issued by a college/university or college/university ID, an applicable diplomas/certificates, a copy of their passport, a family book if accompanied by family members, a telephone number, an address in the Republic of Lebanon, a non-refundable return or circle trip ticket, and there are no Israeli stamps, visas, or seals on their passport.

== Approval requirement from the Lebanese Immigration General Directorate for General Security ==
The following are required to obtain a pre-approval from the General Directorate of General Security in addition to a visa:

- Citizens of the Republic of Lebanon holding a Laissez-Passer issued by the Republic of Lebanon or those who have been deported back to the Republic of Lebanon
- Countries that export workers
  - Citizens of Bangladesh, Benin, Burkina Faso, Cameroon, Central African Republic, Chad, Comoros, Côte d'Ivoire, Egypt, Ethiopia, Gabon, Gambia, Ghana, Guinea-Bissau, India, Indonesia, Kenya, Liberia, Madagascar, Malawi, Mali, Mauritius, Mozambique, Myanmar, Nepal, Nicaragua, Nigeria, Pakistan, Philippines, Seychelles, Sierra Leone, Sudan, Togo, Uganda and Zambia
- Holders of Jordanian passports without a national serial number, issued to Palestinians residing in the West Bank
- Citizens of Iraq holding visas issued by the Embassy of the Republic of Lebanon in Baghdad after February 20, 2007
- Females who have previously undertaken employment or currently working as artists or masseuses in the Republic of Lebanon, irrespective of the length of time spent out of the Republic of Lebanon
- Holders of Emergency Passports issued by any country other than Australia, France, the Netherlands, and Sweden
- Holders of Alien Passports

=== GDGS Immigration Pre-Approval Documents Exemptions ===
The following cases are exempted from all the conditions concerning the address, the non-refundable return or circle trip ticket, and the pre-approval from the General Directorate of General Security:

- The wife of a citizen of the Republic of Lebanon, who did not work previously as an artist or a masseuse, after presenting a document asserting the marriage. Marital status must be officially registered for more than one year
- The wife of a Palestinian refugee in the Republic of Lebanon or a holder of a valid identity card under consideration and who did not work previously as an artist or a masseuse, after presenting a document asserting the marriage. Marital status must be officially registered for more than one year
- The wife of a Syrian citizen accompanying him and who did not work previously as an artist or masseuse in the Republic of Lebanon, provided that the marriage is registered on the husband's family register or by presenting a document proving the marriage. Marital status must be officially registered for more than one year
- Women who did not work previously as artists or masseuses in the Republic of Lebanon, accompanying their husband, their child, one of their parents, brothers
- The mother in law of a citizen of the Republic of Lebanon after presenting a document asserting the kinship
- Women coming among official delegations, or those holding private, special or diplomatic passports
- The wife of a citizen of the Republic of Lebanon who has previously worked as an artist or a masseuse and left the Republic of Lebanon for a period of more than one year, if she is accompanied by one or more of her children from this marriage after presenting the documents proving the marriage
- The wife of a foreigner non-Arabic man who has previously worked as an artist or a masseuse and had left the Republic of Lebanon for a period more than one year, provided that she is in his company and that she holds a document proving the marriage

== Applying for a visa ==
All visitors must apply in person at an Embassy or a General Consulate of the Republic of Lebanon, fill in the application form and pay the application processing fee at a visa application center.

Citizens of the seven visa-exempt countries and territories or the 81 countries and territories whose citizens are eligible for a visa on arrival can obtain the visa before travel but are exempted from submitting proof documents but will still be required to pay a processing fee.

The visa application will be sent to the Ministry of Foreign Affairs in the Republic of Lebanon by the diplomatic pouch. One should apply one month before travel date. Head of Missions outside the Republic of Lebanon have the right to issue visas to the Republic of Lebanon given that the visa grant is "under the responsibility of the Head of Mission", except in the cases of Palestinian refugees or holders of passports issued by the Palestinian Authority or Jordan without a national ID number.

A visitor's visa for a single entry costs 35 USD and for a multiple entry costs 70 USD for stays up to 3 months. For applicants holding a managerial or a more senior position the visa is processed at the Embassy or General Consulate of the Republic of Lebanon within 2-3 working days, for applicants holding a non-managerial position, the visa is processed between 6 and 8 weeks if approved by the Directorate General of General Security in the Republic of Lebanon.

=== Terms ===
- All documents should be submitted in Arabic, French or English. The General Security has the right to request further documents if it is necessary
- Visas are valid from the date they are issued, for a period of 90 days before the date of entry to the Republic of Lebanon for a period of 15 days or a month or three months or 6 months. The stay period is effective from the date of entry to the Republic of Lebanon.
- Visas cannot be issued on passports bearing Israeli stamps, visas, or seals.
- A Lebanese visa is rendered invalid if the passport was subsequently stamped with an Israeli stamp, visa, or seal.
- After a person has successfully granted a Lebanese visa, if they subsequently obtain a new passport, but the Lebanese visa in their old passport still has remaining validity, they are not required to have the Lebanese visa vignette affixed in the old passport transferred to the new passport, but must be able to present both the new and old passports at passport control when entering the Republic of Lebanon.
- If a person who has successfully granted a Lebanese visa subsequently loses the passport in which the visa vignette is affixed or if it is stolen, they will have to pay the original visa fee in full again and may be required to show that his/her circumstances have not changed when applying for a replacement visa.

=== Required documents ===
- Passport valid for 3 months beyond the period of intended stay and with two blank pages bearing no Israeli stamps, visas, or seals
- Photocopies of the passport pages (Passport cover, bio-page, pages 7 and 9, and last page) containing the full name, photo, passport number, issue date, and expiry date (one copy of each page)
- Appointment Letter
- Proof of fee payment, which is a valid receipt
- A copy of applicant's residency card with no less than 6 months until expiration if applying at the Embassy or General Consulate of the Republic of Lebanon outside the applicant's country of origin
- Two passport-sized photos and must be on a white background format 3.5 cm x 4.5 cm taken from the front and should be fresh new photographs
- Recent three months original and till dated online bank statement (should state A/c. holder's name, sort-code & account number on any internet banking printout should be stamped by the bank
- Travel reservations showing dates of travel
- Hotel reservations in the name of the sponsor in the Republic of Lebanon or place of residency in the Republic of Lebanon with a listed contact number. If the sponsor is not a citizen of the Republic of Lebanon, they must show proof of residency in the Republic of Lebanon for at least 3 months (hotel booking or host's reference letter)
- No objection letter from the sponsor mentioning the reason of the visit or for minors, a Parental Consent Form* from both parents allowing their dependents to travel to the Republic of Lebanon is required
- Travel insurance must clearly state all the travelling passengers' names on the policy. The area of validity must clearly cover the Republic of Lebanon or worldwide, coverage of at least 30,000 USD for emergency medical & repatriation in order to face any expenses that may arise in connection with the applicant's repatriation for medical reasons, urgent medical attention or emergency hospital treatment, with these scenarios expressly stated on the policy document
- Original Full Birth Certificate, stating both parents' names and child's name (for minor applicants)
- For those with passports from the Palestinian Authority or Jordan without a national ID number who are living in occupied Palestine, they will need proof that they can return.

== Visa types and requirements ==
=== Tourist visa ===
Eligibility

- Tourists
- People visiting relatives or friends
- People wishing to visit Lebanon for a short period for the purpose of making or meeting with businesses, contacts, attending trade fairs, speaking at conferences etc.
- Unpaid participation in athletic or artistic event or competition. An invitation letter from the sponsoring organization in the Republic of Lebanon is required
- Unpaid participation in a scientific/academic seminar or conference sponsored by a research or academic institution. An invitation letter from the sponsoring organization in the Republic of Lebanon is required.

=== Temporary & permanent residence visa ===
Foreigners wishing to live and work in the Republic of Lebanon are required to apply for a temporary residence visa. To obtain a temporary visa for employment purposes, the worker needs to secure a job offer from a company based in the Republic of Lebanon or government department, or a foreign company based in the Republic of Lebanon, and the company is required to apply to the Immigration Division of the Ministry of Labor on the worker's behalf.

The criteria for approval of an employment visa include suitable educational qualifications or work experience, a secured employment contract in the Republic of Lebanon, proof of adequate means of subsistence in the Republic of Lebanon, police confirmation that the worker has no criminal record, and a satisfactory medical examination.

All official documents must be translated into Arabic, French, or English and 'legalized' by the embassy or general consulate of the Republic of Lebanon abroad. The application processing period is normally around 1-3 weeks. Employment visas are issued for a specific job, and are not transferable between employers in the Republic of Lebanon without permission. Visas are also issued to the employment visa holder's spouse and children.

Foreign citizens aged over 50 can apply for a permanent visa if they have a pension of at least 3,000,000 Lebanese Lira (2,000 USD) per month and will transfer it to the Republic of Lebanon every month.

Visas may also issued to the visa holder's spouse and children. Applicants for permanent residence visas are required to submit their passport, birth certificate, marriage certificate if applicable, documentary proof of the pension and a bank declaration authorizing he monthly transfer to the Republic of Lebanon, and a police certificate of no criminal record, issued within the last 90 days.

=== Transit visa ===
A Transit Without Visa (TWOV) applies if the traveler is passing through an international transit area of at Beirut International Airport in order to board a connecting or to proceed by the same flight to an international destination, without entering the Republic of Lebanon or Clearing Immigration. This however does not apply to:

- Travelers holding stand-by or refundable tickets
- Citizens of the following 18 countries:

- Afghanistan
- Angola
- Bangladesh
- Burundi
- Cameroon
- Central African Republic
- DR Congo
- Eritrea
- Ethiopia
- Kosovo
- Liberia
- Myanmar
- Nepal
- North Korea
- Pakistan
- Republic of the Congo
- South Sudan
- Sri Lanka

Duration	Cost
Up to 48 hours	Free
48 hours to 15 days	25,000 LBP

This visa must be applied for at least 2 days before the trip, provided submitting a copy of a visa or residence permit related to the country of destination and the airline ticket.

=== Courtesy visa ===
It is granted for VIPs by Embassies or General Consulates of the Republic of Lebanon abroad or by the General Director of General Security free of charge provided they present a letter from their mission or the ministry of foreign affairs or the employer explaining the purpose of the travel.

=== Collective visa ===
It is granted for groups, and the fee is collected from each member of the groups.

=== Work visa ===
It is granted for 3 months costs 200.000 LP based on a pre-approval from the Ministry of Labor. All of the documents for a tourist visa are needed, as well as an invitation letter from sponsor or trade partner in the Republic of Lebanon and their contact information (showing period of stay and name, address and phone number of sponsor), a proof that the trade partner is certified in the Republic of Lebanon, and a proof that there is a relationship between applicant and the trade partner by means of a commercial announcement.

== Israel-related restrictions ==
Entry and transit is refused to nationals of Israel, even if not leaving the aircraft and proceeding by the same flight. Travelers who hold passports that contain stamps, visas, or seals for Israel will be refused entry and transit into Lebanon and may be subject to arrest or detention.

Even if their travel documents currently do not have Israeli stamps or visas, persons seeking entry into the Republic of Lebanon who have previously traveled to Israel may still face arrest or detention if this travel is disclosed. The government of Lebanon has the authority to refuse admission to other countries' citizens and to detain them for further inspection.

== See also ==
- Constitution of Lebanon
- Driving licence in Lebanon
- Foreign relations of Lebanon
- History of Lebanon
- Lebanese diaspora
- Lebanese identity card
- Lebanese passport
- Politics of Lebanon
- Vehicle registration plates of Lebanon
- Visa requirements for Lebanese citizens
