= Lebanese passport =

Passport of the Republic of Lebanon issued to Lebanese citizens

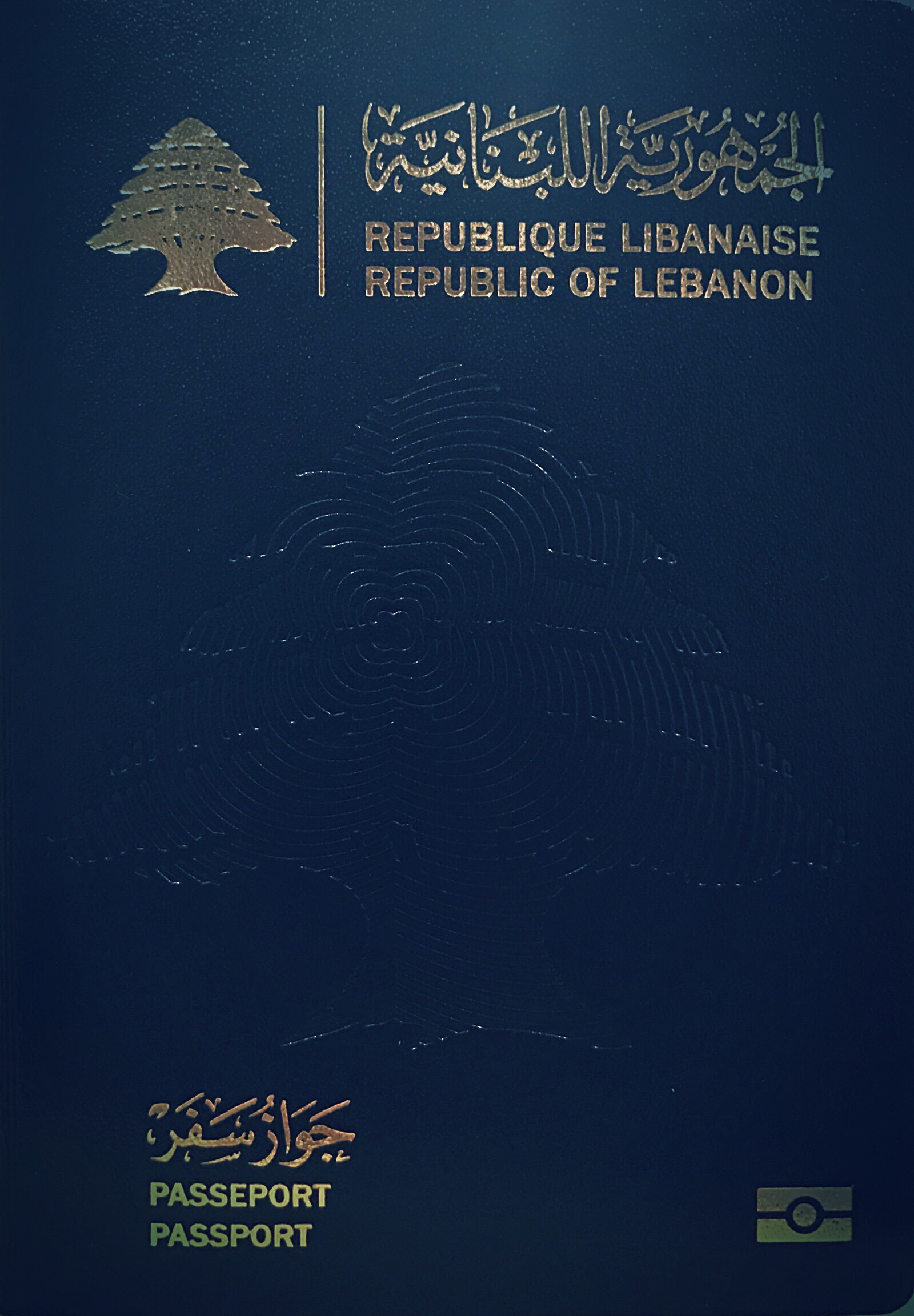
- The front cover of the contemporary Lebanese biometric passport
- Type: Passport
- Issued by: Lebanon
- First issued: 1944 (First Lebanese Travel Document; Black Cover); 1990 (Lebanese Non-machine Readable Passport; Burgundy Red Cover); April 12, 2003 (Lebanese Machine Readable Passport; Navy Blue Cover); August 1, 2016 (Lebanese Biometric Passport; Navy Blue Cover)
- Purpose: Identification
- Valid in: All countries
- Eligibility: Lebanese citizenship
- Expiration: 5 years or 10 years after acquisition.
- Cost: £L£L6,000,000 ($67) for 5 years £L10,000,000 ($111) for 10 years.

The Lebanese passport (Arabic: جواز سفر الجمهورية اللبنانية, romanized: Jawāz Safar Al-Jumhūrīyah Al-Lubnānīyah) is a passport issued to the citizens of the Republic of Lebanon to enable them to travel outside the Republic of Lebanon and entitles the bearer to the protection from the diplomatic missions and consulates of the Republic of Lebanon if necessary. It is issued exclusively by the Lebanese Directorate General of General Security (DGGS), and can also be issued at various Lebanese diplomatic missions and/or consulates outside of the Republic of Lebanon. It allows the bearer a freedom of living in the Republic of Lebanon without any immigration requirements, participate in the Lebanese political system, entry to and exit from the Republic of Lebanon through any port, travel to and from other countries in accordance with visa requirements, facilitates the process of securing consular assistance abroad from the diplomatic missions and consulates of the Republic of Lebanon if necessary, and requests protection for the bearer while abroad.

Lebanese passport booklets are valid for travel by Lebanese citizens anywhere in the world to countries with which the government of the Republic of Lebanon maintains diplomatic ties although travel to certain countries and/or for certain purposes may require a visa and the Republic of Lebanon itself restricts its citizens from traveling to or engaging in commercial transactions in certain countries against the internal and external safety of the republic. They conform with recommended standards (i.e., size, composition, layout, technology) of the International Civil Aviation Organization (ICAO).

By law, a valid unexpired Lebanese passport or identity card (Arabic: بطاقة الهوية, romanized: Bitakat Al Hawiya) is conclusive (and not just prima facie) proof of Lebanese citizenship, and has the same force and effect as proof of Lebanese citizenship as certificates of naturalization or of citizenship, if issued to a Lebanese citizen for the full period allowed by law. The Lebanese law does not prohibit Lebanese citizens from holding passports of other countries, though they are required to use their Lebanese passport to enter and leave the country. The Republic of Lebanon law permits dual nationality. An expired Lebanese passport can still be used to return to the Republic of Lebanon at any port and port personnel are obliged by law to allow the passage of the bearer without any delay or hindrance. Lebanese passports are property of the Republic of Lebanon and must be returned to the Lebanese Government upon demand.

The French state-run printing firm, Imprimerie Nationale carries on the official printing works of both the Lebanese and French governments.

As of January 10, 2016, The Lebanese Directorate General of General Security (DGGS) has stopped renewing passports with handwritten notes and started issuing new ones instead. This move is intended for the introduction of the new Lebanese Biometric Passport on August 1, 2016. As of August 1, 2016 all passports being issued by the Lebanese Directorate General of General Security (DGGS) are Biometric and hold the biometric passport symbol. Non-biometric passports are valid until their expiry dates.

== Types ==
- Ordinary Passport (Arabic: جواز سفر عادي; French: Passeport ordinaire) - Issued to citizens for occasional travel, such as vacations and business trips
- Temporary Passport (Arabic: جواز سفر مؤقت; French: Passeport temporaire) - Issued in emergency cases to those who are in need to travel on short notice or urgently need to replace their lost or stolen passport. This passport contains 8 pages and is valid for a period between six months and one year. An emergency passport may be exchanged for a full-term passport. Strict rules apply.
- Collective Passport (Arabic: جواز سفر جماعي; French: Passeport collectif) - Issued for the occasion of pilgrimages, excursions and other acts of analogous nature, facilitating the issuance of visas, or to decrease administrative costs if a lot of group members do not have their individual passports. Main users of these passports are high schools and tourist agencies. whenever reciprocity with the destiny country exists, its validity is limited a single trip, whose duration will not be able to exceed three months. Though it is not primary means of international travel for organised groups, high schools, and tourism agencies. All members of the group must cross the border at the same time and be part of the same organized trip.
- Diplomatic Passport (Arabic: جواز سفر دبلوماسي; French: Passeport diplomatique) - Issued to diplomats, Top ranking government officials, Diplomatic couriers, Members of the National Assembly, Parliament members, Head judges of the judicial organs, and their deputies, Negotiators that are to deal with international issues, Spouse of the diplomatic passport holders (this passport can only be used when accompanying the primary passport holder), and Unwed and unemployed daughters, and sons younger than 18 years of age of the diplomatic passport holders who live with their parents (this passport can only be used when accompanying the primary passport holder) upon the request of the Ministry of Foreign Affairs. Validity is determined by the nature of the position held.
- Official Passports and on Watch (Arabic: جواز سفر رسمي اثناء الخدمة; French: Passeport officiel et de service) - Issued to individuals representing the Lebanese government if travelling on official business and to Lebanese military personnel when deployed overseas. Validity is determined by the nature of the position held.
- Emergency passport (Arabic: جواز سفر طوارئ; French: Passeport d'urgence) - Issued to citizens for direct return to the Republic of Lebanon. It contains details of the person, photo, travel details and expiry date of the document and can only be used for one travel.
- Alien's passport (Arabic: جواز سفر للاجانب دون جواز سفر; French: Passeport étranger) - Issued for travelling purposes to non-Lebanese residents of the Republic of Lebanon who are unable to obtain a passport from their own government.
- Laissez-Passer (Arabic: جواز سفر مرور; French: Passeport Laissez-passer) - Issued as an emergency travel document with 8 pages containing handwritten information.
- Refugee Travel Document (Arabic: وثيقة سفر للاجئين; French: Document de voyage de réfugiés) - Not a full passport, but issued to aliens who have been classified as refugees or asylees.
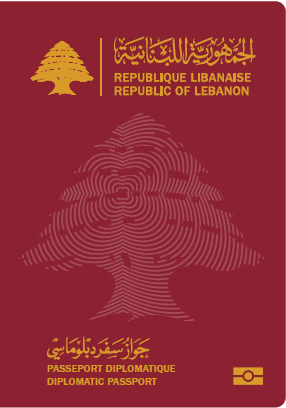
Diplomatic passport

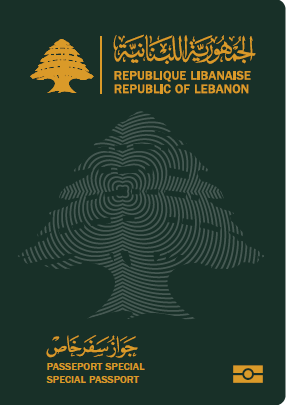
Special passport

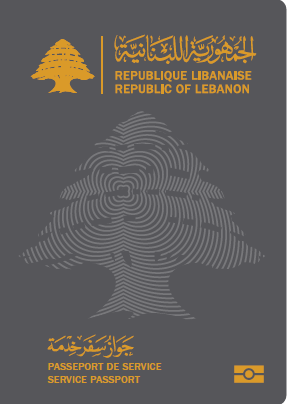
Service passport

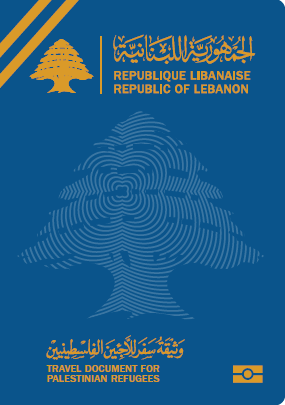
Travel document for Palestinian refugees in Lebanon

== History ==
Passports issued before the adoption of the navy blue new design were burgundy red and were neither machine readable nor biometric.

In 2012, The Lebanese Directorate General of General Security (DGGS) announced that it would be issuing biometric passports to all of its citizens starting from July 2016. The biometric passport will have a contactless smartcard RFID chip encoded with the bearer's name, gender, date and place of birth, and a digital image of their face, ten fingerprints, palmprints, and electronic signature in a JPEG2000 format embedded at the bottom of the front cover under the word "PASSEPORT".

The Lebanese Directorate General of General Security (DGGS) states that "The use of biometric passports will allow the Republic of Lebanon to follow international standards in the field of passport security to protect the nation's borders and maintain the ease of international travel that Lebanese citizens deserve to enjoy". At the same time, the Lebanese Directorate General of General Security (DGGS) started offering the option of a 5-year validity period as well as the current 1-year validity period. The Lebanese passport can only be renewed for 1-year through diplomatic missions and consulates of the Republic of Lebanon abroad,

=== The old burgundy red passport ===
A 32-page passport with a burgundy red cover, commonly known as the old burgundy style came into use in 1990 under the auspices of the International Civil Aviation Organization (ICAO) with the formation of the Passport Service following international agreement on a standard format for passports, and remained in use until replaced by the modern-style machine-readable navy blue passport on April 12, 2003. As with many documents worldwide and all booklet-format documents, details were handwritten into the passport and (as of 1998) included: number, holder's name, "accompanied by his wife" and her maiden name, "and" (number) "children", national status. For both bearer and wife: profession, place and date of birth, country of residence, height, eye and hair colour, special peculiarities, signature and photograph. Names, birth dates, and sexes of children, list of countries for which valid, issue place and date, expiry date, a page for renewals and, at the back, details of the amount of foreign exchange for travel expenses (a limited amount of sterling, typically the equivalent of £L11,500, but increasing with inflation, could be taken out of the country). The bearer's sex was not explicitly stated, although the name was written in with title ("Mr"). Descriptive text was printed in both Arabic, French, and English. (a practice which still continues), e.g. برفقة زوجته / Accompagné de sa femme (Née) / Accompanied by his wife (Maiden name)/. Changed details were struck out and rewritten, with a rubber-stamped note confirming the change.

If details and photograph of a man's wife and details of children were entered (this was not compulsory), the passport could be used by the bearer, wife, and children under 16, if together; separate passports were required for the wife or children to travel independently. Notes section at back: "A passport including particulars of the holder's wife is not available for the wife's use when she is travelling alone." The passport was valid for five years, renewable for another five, after which it had to be replaced. Notes section at back: "... available for five years in the first instance, ... may be renewed for further periods ... provided ... ten years from the original date is not exceeded."

The passport had a printed list of countries for which it was valid, which was added to in handwriting as validity increased.

As of November 24, 2015 all citizens that possess the burgundy red Lebanese passport must submit them to the Lebanese Directorate General of General Security (DGGS) or at any Lebanese embassy as well as any of the various diplomatic missions and consulates of the Republic of Lebanon abroad. These passports will no longer be valid since they are not machine-readable. The International Civil Aviation Organization (ICAO) has decided that November 24, 2015 will be the deadline to implement the use of machine-readable passports only in travel through airports. Those who possess the red Lebanese passport must apply for the navy blue (machine-readable) passport as soon as possible.

=== The old navy blue non-biometric passport ===
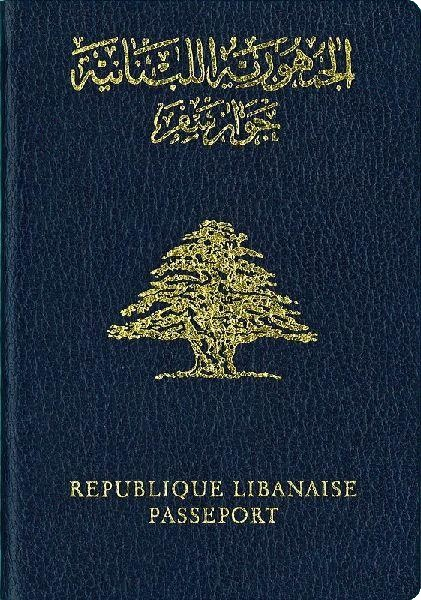
Lebanese non-biometric passport (2003–2016)

On 12 April 2003, the Republic of Lebanon started issuing ICAO compliant machine-readable non-biometric passports with the navy blue cover, valid for one or five years, replacing the old burgundy red passport. It is the 45th nation in the world to adopt the ICAO standard. The implementation of the new passport began at offices across Beirut and Tripoli before expanding nationwide between April and June 2003 and to Lebanese embassies/consulates abroad between September and October 2003.

The Lebanese Directorate General of General Security (DGGS) stopped issuing the old navy blue non-biometric Lebanese passports and started issuing biometric passports to Lebanese citizens starting from 1 August 2016. The old non-biometric navy blue passports are valid until their expiry dates when will be renewed with the new navy blue biometric passports.

=== The new navy blue biometric passport ===
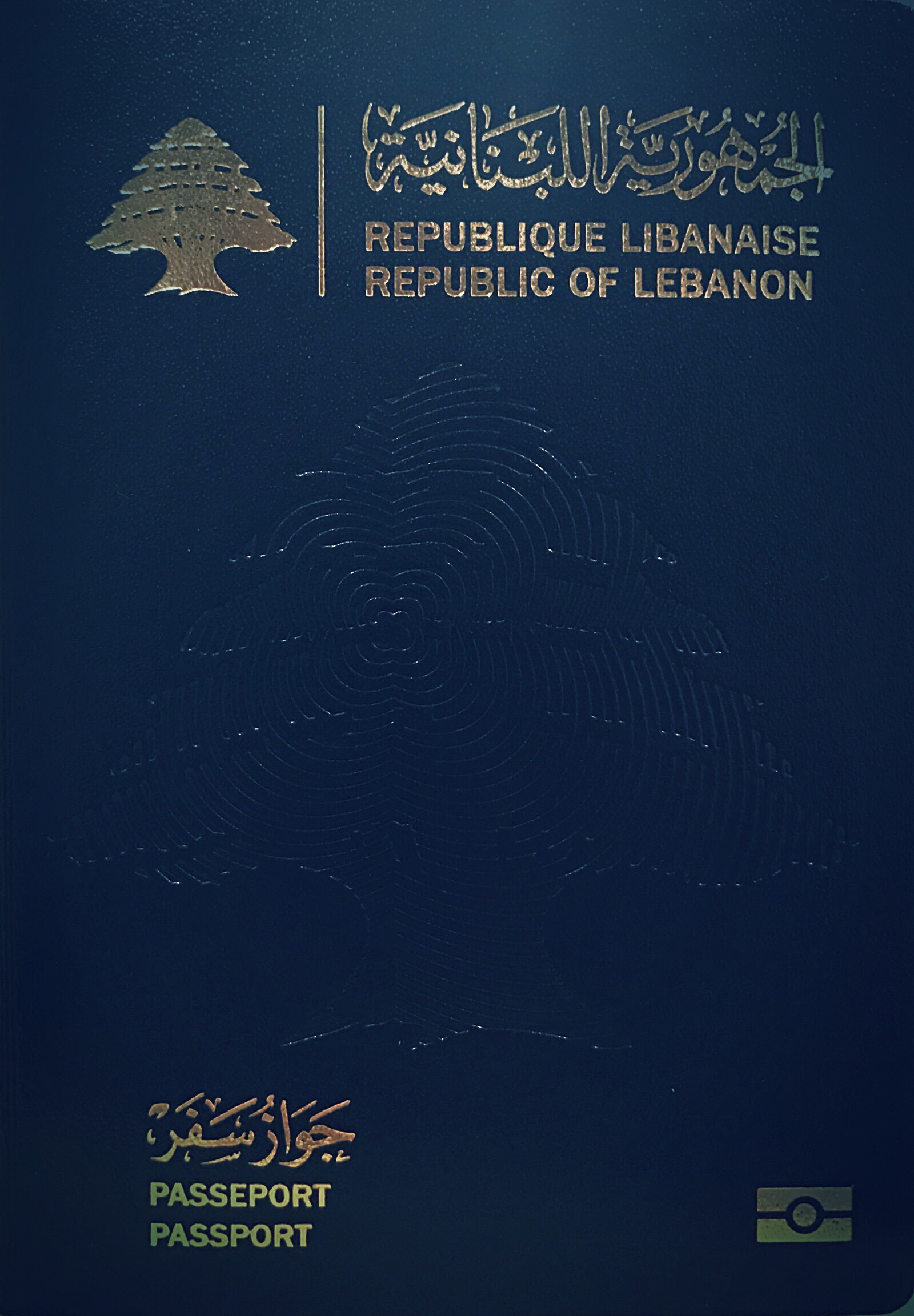
Lebanese biometric passport (2016–present)

In 2012, a new contract was signed between the Lebanese Directorate General of General Security (DGGS) with a Lebanese company Inkript, a member of Resource Group Holding (RGH), to make the move for biometric passports. Inkript held a joint venture with French firm Gemalto, based in the Netherlands to participate in the tender. Jacques Seif, General Manager of Inkript, said: “We will handle all the programming and software development in-house, while Gemalto will be in charge of manufacturing the passports and matching the program’s interface with the coding machines.”. The contract's term is three years, and Inkript will produce four million Lebanese biometric passports. The contract, valued at around 140 million US dollars, was funded by a Saudi grant. The Lebanese Directorate General of General Security (DGGS) announced that it would be issuing biometric passports to all of its citizens starting from July 2016.

As of August 1, 2016, all new Lebanese passports issued will be biometric passports and machine-readable and will have a contactless smartcard RFID chip embedded inside the polycarbonate data page (3rd EU generation) or a cheap booklet in which the chip is imbedded at the bottom of the front cover under the word "PASSEPORT".

Facial recognition technology is being introduced to coincide with the release of the Biometric Passport. This technology will be used to improve identity verification, reduce identity-related fraud, and protect the legal identity of the citizens of the Republic of Lebanon. Similar technology is used in the Lebanese identity card.

The biometric data that is to be included on the Lebanese passport is the bearer's name, gender, date and place of birth, and a digital image of their face, ten fingerprints, palmprints. Lebanese immigration checkpoints will not be the only ones with the technology to read and authenticate the data from the RFID chip using a fingerprint scanner and facial recognition technology, but widespread adoption of Biometric passport technology around the world has seen the technology installed in international airports in the US, the UK and other countries.

In addition to biometric data and the personal information stored on the information page, the chip also records the bearer's travel history of the last ten entry and exits at Lebanese border control points (Beirut–Rafic Hariri International Airport, Beirut Naval Base, Port of Beirut, Port of Byblos, and Port of Tripoli).

All biometric passport will be issued with 48 pages as opposed to the previous choice of 24 or 48 pages.

On 14 August 2014, the Lebanese Directorate General of General Security (DGGS) released requirements for the new biometric residence permits (Arabic: بطاقات الإقامة البيومترية الذكية (transl. Bitakat Iqama Bayometriya Thakiya; French: Cartes de résidence à puce biométrique) issued to the expatriates residing temporarily or permanently in the Republic of Lebanon. On 15 January 2015, all of the Lebanese government offices started issuing and dealing with the new Biometric residence and work permits in dealing with the official paperworks of expatriates.

The Lebanese Directorate General of General Security (DGGS) started issuing biometric passports to Lebanese citizens starting from 1 August 2016.

== Issuance ==
=== Application ===
An application is required for the issuance of a Lebanese passport.

An application for a Lebanese passport made abroad is forwarded by Diplomatic Missions of the Republic of Lebanon for processing by the Lebanese Directorate General of General Security (DGGS) in the Republic of Lebanon. The resulting passport is sent to the Diplomatic Mission of the Republic of Lebanon for issuance to the applicant. An emergency passport is issuable by Diplomatic Missions of the Republic of Lebanon. Regular issuance takes approximately 6–8 weeks. The Lebanese Directorate General of General Security (DGGS) may deny or revoke passports for foreign policy or national security reasons at any time.

=== Requirements ===
- Passport Application Form. (Obtained from government offices or can be downloaded from their website.)
- Old passport. (if applicable, regardless of expiry date)
- Identity Card. (Arabic: بطاقة الهوية (transl. Bitakat Al Hawiya); French: carte d'identité)
- Individual and Family status records (Arabic: اخراج القيد الفردي و العائلي) whose date of issuance does not exceed 3 months.
- An Original or a Certified copy of birth certificate issued by a consular office abroad.
- Criminal Record Status. (Arabic: ورقة ان لا حكم عليه)
- Official Residence Permit. (Only applicable if applying for a Lebanese passport from one of the Lebanese embassies/consulates outside the Republic of Lebanon.)
- 2 Recent Photos. (Size: 4.3 x 3.5 cm) authenticated by a Mukhtar.
- Fingerprints and all biometric data is collected at the Passport Application Center(s). (Fingerprint data is not collected from minors aged 12 and under.)
- Professional Certificate or Degree. (For stating the profession in the passport.)

=== Photograph requirements ===
Lebanese Directorate General of General Security (DGGS) have a strict guideline for passport photos. Submitting unacceptable photos will result in the rejection of one's application. Official Lebanese Directorate General of General Security (DGGS) photographic guidelines are available online. All passports should be authenticated by the Mukhtar.

- Must be taken within the last six months before application
- 4.3 cm × 3.5 cm (1.7 in × 1.4 in)
- The height of the head (top of hair to bottom of chin) should measure 1 to 1 3/8 inches (25 to 35 mm)
- Eye height is between 1 1/8 to 1 3/8 inches (29 to 35 mm) from the bottom of the photo
- Front view, full face, open eyes, closed mouth, and neutral expression
- Full head from top of hair to shoulders
- Plain white or off-white background
- No shadows on face or in background
- No reflections of flashlight
- No sunglasses (unless for medical purposes), but those normally wearing corrective glasses must wear such glasses
- No hat (unless for religious purposes)
- No headwear of any kind, unless wearing for religious purposes (such as hijabs)
- Normal contrast and lighting
- Other parts of the body, such as hands or feet, must not be in the picture
- Alteration of any kind from the original picture is prohibited
- Printed on professional-grade photographic paper

For extra security, the photos must contain the stamped or handwritten address of the studio and the exact date they were taken. In addition, a declaration and signatures made by a guarantor and mukhtar are required, as they must certify the photos are true likeliness of the applicant.

==== Issuing restriction ====
Passports are not issued to persons who are under arrest because of criminal offenses, or to those who appear as 'dangerous' in accordance with the International Police Agreement of 1920.

Under the 'Passports Act 2005', the Minister for Foreign Affairs has the power to refuse, cancel or suspend a passport on a number of grounds including national security or health. In addition, a court can order an accused in a criminal matter, or any other person, to surrender their passport, for example, as a condition of grant of bail or otherwise.

People who owe £L3,800,000 (US$2,500) or more in child support, are not eligible to receive a Lebanese passport. Therefore, they should make arrangements to pay the agency where child support is owed before they submit their application for a Lebanese passport. All questions about their child support arrears or the status of a payment should be directed to the appropriate child support enforcement agency.

=== Fees ===
Fees for applying vary based on whether or not an applicant is applying for a new passport or they are renewing an expiring passport for either 5 or 10 years. Fees also vary depending on whether an applicant is under the age of 5.18+ individuals can only obtain a 10 year passport while under 18s can only obtain a 5 year one.

As of October 2023:

Type	Fees
Passport valid for 5 years	6,000,000 L.L
Passport valid for 10 years	10,000,000 L.L
Passport - first class - 5 years	30,000,000 L.L
Passport - second class - 5 years	20,000,000 L.L
Passport - first class - 10 years	60,000,000 L.L
Passport - second class - 10 years	40,000,000 L.L

NB: To receive the passport immediately, the interested party can apply at the department of public relations. An additional fee of LBP 4,900,000 will be however requested.

=== Multiple passports ===
Multiple passports are issued to Lebanese citizens on official business, and to diplomats, the latter a process followed by virtually all countries. The United Nations laissez-passer is a similar document issued by that international organization.

However, more than one valid Lebanese passport of the same type may not be held, except if authorized by the Lebanese Directorate General of General Security (DGGS).

It is routine for the Lebanese Directorate General of General Security (DGGS) to authorize a holder of a regular passport to hold, in addition, a diplomatic passport or an official passport or a no-fee passport.

One circumstance which may call for issuance of a second passport of a particular type is a prolonged visa-processing delay especially for Angola and São Tomé and Príncipe visa applications. Another is safety or security. The period of validity of a second passport issued under either circumstance is generally two years from the date of issue.

== Physical appearance ==
Lebanese passports are navy blue, with the Lebanese Cedar emblazoned in the centre of the front cover.

"The Lebanese Republic, Passport" is written on the cover page in both Arabic and French. The contents of the passport are in Arabic, French and English.

There are 48 pages in the current machine-readable navy blue passport. Frequent travelers may request 52-page passports for no additional cost. Extra visa pages can be added by mail (if the passport holder resides in the Republic of Lebanon) and at most diplomatic missions and consulates of the Republic of Lebanon abroad (if the passport holder resides or visits a country overseas). The addition of visa pages used to be free, but as of July 13, 2010, the non-refundable application fee for 24 or 48 additional pages costs £L120,000.

=== Front cover ===
On the front cover, a large representation of the Lebanese Cedar is inscribed at the center, as well as a smaller golden one at the top left corner. The words "الجمهورية اللبنانية", "République libanaise", and "Republic of Lebanon" are centered on top with the words "جواز سفر", "Passeport", and "Passport" appearing on the bottom right corner. The biometric passport symbol is positioned on the bottom right.

An Official passport has "OFFICIEL" (in all capital letters) above the words "الجمهورية اللبنانية", "RÉPUBLIQUE LIBANAISE", and "REPUBLIC OF LEBANON" (in all capital letters). The capital letters of "OFFICIEL" are somewhat smaller than the capital letters of "RÉPUBLIQUE LIBANAISE", and "REPUBLIC OF LEBANON".

A Diplomatic passport has "DIPLOMATIQUE" (in all capital letters) above the words "الجمهورية اللبنانية", "RÉPUBLIQUE LIBANAISE", and "REPUBLIC OF LEBANON" (in all capital letters). The capital letters of "DIPLOMATIQUE" are somewhat smaller than the capital letters of "RÉPUBLIQUE LIBANAISE", and "REPUBLIC OF LEBANON".

A Refugee Travel Document issued Palestinian refugees in Lebanon is instead brown in color, with the words "DOCUMENT DE VOYAGE pour les RÉFUGIÉS PALESTINIENS" inscribed below the words "RÉPUBLIQUE LIBANAISE", and "REPUBLIC OF LEBANON" (in all capital letters).

=== Passport note ===
The passports contain a note from the issuing authority addressed to the authorities of all other states, identifying the bearer as a citizen of the Republic of Lebanon and requesting that they be allowed to pass and be treated according to international norms. The textual portions of Lebanese passports are printed in Arabic, the official language of the Republic of Lebanon, as well as in both French and English languages. The note inside of the Lebanese passport states:

- In Arabic: "الجمهوريّة اللبنانيّة بإسم رئيس الجمهوريّة اللبنانيّة إنّ مدير عام الأمن العام يأمل من السلطات المختصّة تسهيل مرور صاحب هذا الجواز و منحه المساعدة و الحماية القانونية عند اللزوم"
- In French: "République Libanaise Au nom du Président de la République Libanaise Le Directeur Général de la Sûreté Générale prie les autorités compétentes de bien vouloir accorder libre passage au titulaire de ce passeport et en cas de besoin, de lui accorder toute aide et protection légitimes."
- In English: "Republic of Lebanon On behalf of The President of the Republic of Lebanon The General Director of the General Security hereby requests competent authorities to permit the bearer to pass without any delay or hindrance and in case of need to provide all lawful aid and protection."

=== Information page ===
Lebanese passports include the following data on the information page:

Data	Description
Photograph of the holder	Digital image printed on the page
Type	P for ordinary passports, PD for diplomatic passports, PO for official passports
Country code	LBN
Passport Number	A seven digit number, biometric passports begins with RL or LR
Name	
First Name	
Father's name	
Nationality	(لبناني/ Lebanese)
Date of birth	DD.MM.YYYY
Sex	M for male, F for female
Place of birth	(Only the city or town is listed, even if born outside the Republic of Lebanon) (See note below)
Date of issue	DD.MM.YYYY
Authority	GDGS
Date of expiry	DD.MM.YYYY
Machine Readable Zone	Starts with P<LBN

The items are identified by text in Arabic and English (e.g., "تاريخ الولادة / Date of birth").

=== Security features ===
- PKI – Public Key Infrastructure
- IPI- Invisible Personal ID
- 2D Bar code
- Machine-Readable Zone (MRZ)
- Security Substrate and Laminate
- Ultra Violet features Micro Printing
- Holograms
- Watermark Paper
- Security Ink
- 3 Colour Intaglio Printing
- Guilloche Patterns

=== Signature field ===
A Lebanese passport is invalid if the passport is not signed, and normally the bearer affixes his/her signature on the signature field, whose position has varied with various incarnations of Lebanese passports. Persons too young to sign a passport previously may have a parent or legal guardian sign the passport on their behalf, although this has since been prohibited.

Old burgundy red passports originally contained the signature field below the data page at the passport's inner cover. When navy blue passports began being issued in 2003, a field where the bearer must sign the passport appeared above the information page.

=== Place of birth ===
Passport applicants may request, in writing, that their Lebanese passport not list the place of birth (city and country) - or simply the country - on their data page. A separate form is available for such a request, on which one must indicate one's awareness that omitting this information could cause one difficulties at international entry points or when applying for visas.

In response to the government of the People's Republic of China's (PRC) modification to the requirements for the issuance of Chinese visas to Lebanese citizens born in Hong Kong, Macau, and Taiwan the PRC will not issue visas to Lebanese passport holders whose place of birth is inscribed as being Hong Kong HKG, Macau MAC or (city name) TWN. Accordingly, passports issued to Lebanese born in Hong Kong, Macau or Taiwan now only list the place of birth, without an accompanying three-letter country code, unless upon request.

Since April 1976, the policy has been that Lebanese citizens born in Jerusalem have their birthplace identified only by the city's name, with no national designation, due to the unresolved legal status of Jerusalem. Lebanese citizens born prior to 1948 may have their birthplace identified as Palestine if they were born in what was the British Mandate of Palestine (including Jerusalem).

== Visa-free travel ==
Visa requirements for Lebanese citizens Lebanon Visa not required Visa on arrival eVisa Visa available both on arrival or online Visa required

A Lebanese passport does not, in itself, entitle the holder to enter another country. To enter another country, the traveler must comply with the visa and entry requirements of the other countries to be visited, which vary from country to country and may apply specifically to a particular passport type, the traveller's nationality, criminal history, health issues, evidence of sufficient funds, evidence of ticket for exit or many other factors.

Visa requirements for Lebanese citizens are administrative entry restrictions by the authorities of other states placed on citizens of the Republic of Lebanon. As of October 2018, Lebanese citizens have visa-free or visa-on-arrival access to the listed 44 countries and territories, including disputed areas, and partially recognized countries:

- Armenia
- Azerbaijan
- Bolivia
- Benin
- Cambodia
- Cape Verde
- Comoros
- Cook Islands
- Dominica
- Ecuador
- Egypt (Note: Visa-free access only to Alexandria and for South Sinai resorts.)
- Georgia
- Guinea-Bissau
- Haiti
- Iran
- Iraq
- Jordan
- Macau
- Madagascar
- Malaysia
- Maldives
- Mauritania
- Mauritius
- Micronesia
- Mozambique
- Nepal
- Niue
- Oman
- Palau
- Pitcairn Islands
- Qatar
- Rwanda
- Samoa
- Seychelles
- Somalia
- Sri Lanka
- Syria
- Tajikistan
- Thailand
- Timor-Leste
- Togo
- Turkey
- Northern Cyprus
- Tuvalu
- Uganda

Note that the Lebanese Identity Card can be used as an optional replacement for the Lebanese passport in the listed countries and territories:

- Syria
- Jordan

=== Online visa application ===
Lebanese citizens can apply and obtain certain types of visas online to the listed 16 countries and territories, disputed areas, and partially recognized countries:

- Antigua and Barbuda
- Australia
- Canada
- Colombia
- Côte d'Ivoire
- Ethiopia
- Gabon
- Kenya
- Kyrgyzstan
- Lesotho
- Montserrat
- New Zealand
- Nigeria
- Saint Kitts and Nevis
- São Tomé and Príncipe
- Thailand
- Vietnam
- Zambia
- Zimbabwe

== Gallery of historic images ==
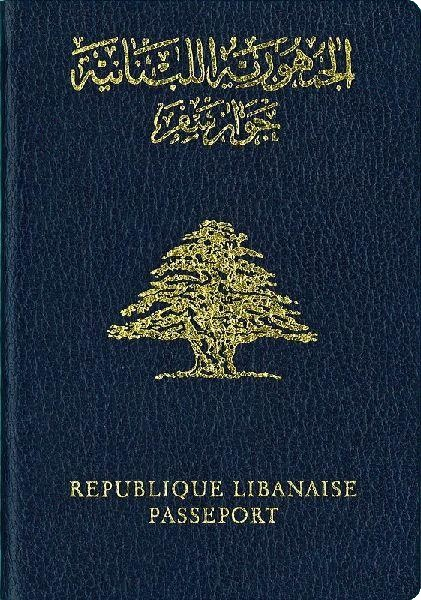
Lebanese non-biometric passport (2003–2016)

== See also ==
- Constitution of Lebanon
- Driving licence in Lebanon
- Foreign relations of Lebanon
- History of Lebanon
- Lebanese diaspora
- Lebanese identity card
- Lebanese nationality law
- Politics of Lebanon
- Vehicle registration plates of Lebanon
- Visa policy of Lebanon
- Visa requirements for Lebanese citizens
