= Driving licence in Lebanon =

A Lebanese driving license is a driving license issued by the government of Lebanon. It authorise its holder to operate various types of motor vehicles on highways and some other publicly accessible roads. It is issued by each individual district (Arabic: قضاء, Kadaa).

As a domestic non-electronic identification, the driving license has remained in a leading position, because most of the population have to have a license anyway, and a driving license is valid for almost every situation where non-electronic personal identification is needed even though they are not officially recognized as such.

== International use ==
Lebanon allows non-residents to use regular licenses issued by other states and countries. Lebanon bears the legal right to suspend an individual's driving privilege within its borders for traffic violations.

Lebanon's visitors who hold overseas driving licenses may be required to take a driving test before they qualify for a full Lebanese license. However, those from countries with similar road rules are only required to take a theory test (similar to the learner license test) within a year of arrival or, for $40, convert their license to a full Lebanese driving license without any further tests (e.g. Jordan); until this time they may continue to drive on their foreign driving license provided it is either written in Arabic, French, or English, or has an authorized translation available.

== Types of licenses ==
- Unrestricted licenses are driving licenses that most Lebanese drivers have in order to drive.
- Hardship licenses for minors are driving licenses that are restricted to drivers between 14 and 15 (sometimes up to 16) who need to drive to and from home and school because of serious hardships, e.g. the driver's family has financial or medical problems; the driver needs to get to work or school and has no other practical way of getting to work or school. A hardship license for minors is distinct from hardship licenses granted for drivers with revoked or suspended licenses.
- Provisional licenses are functionally the same as a driving license, but are typically issued to new drivers under the age of 17, i.e. 15–16 years old.
- Chauffeur licenses are functionally the same as a passenger car license, but also allow its holder to drive a taxi, limo, or other livery vehicle for hire. In Lebanon, chauffeur licenses are not considered commercial or professional driving licenses, and (assuming the driver already holds a regular passenger license) a road test is usually not required to convert it to a chauffeur license, a short written exam on taxi-specific driving laws and/or a background check is required. This type of license is typically, though not universally, called Class E.
- Motorcycle licenses cover motorcycles only; frequently combined with a regular driving license.
- Enhanced licenses establish nationality in addition to driving privileges. A Lebanese passport, Lebanese identity card, or another document proving citizenship is required to apply for this type of license. Motorcycle and commercial driving licenses (see above and below) usually can also be issued as enhanced licenses.

== Classes of licenses ==
The Lebanese driver licensing system is split into six classes of license. Class 1 ("car license") permits its holder to drive most cars: light vehicles, moped, tractor and all-terrain vehicles. On the other hand, Class 6 ("motorcycle license") allows its holder to ride motorcycles. Classes 2, 3, 4, and 5 ("heavy vehicles license") allow their holders to drive heavy vehicles of varying degrees depending on the carried class.

Classes 1 and 6 licenses are obtainable if the driver is 18 or older; the minimum age used to be 16 before 1 August 2011.

This table shows which license is required to drive which vehicles:

Vehicle	Class 1 (Car)	Class 2 (Medium Rigid)	Class 3 (Medium Combination)	Class 4 (Heavy Rigid)	Class 5 (Heavy Combination)	Class 6 (Motorcycle)
Car or light rigid vehicle	Yes	Yes	Yes	Yes	Yes	No
Car or light rigid vehicle with trailer	Yes	Yes	Yes	Yes	Yes	No
Moped	Yes	Yes	Yes	Yes	Yes	Yes
Motorcycle	No	No	No	No	No	Yes
Tractor or farm machinery	Up to 4500 kg (all licences); Up to 6000 kg (full licence); Up to 18,000 kg if driven at 40 km/h or less (restricted and full licence)	Up to 18,000 kg	Up to 18,000 kg	Yes	Yes	No
Heavy rigid vehicle (Weight > 3500 kg)	Up to 4500 kg (all licences) up to 6000 kg (full licence)	Up to 18,000 kg Yes if vehicle has two or fewer axles	Up to 18,000 kg Yes if vehicle has two or fewer axles	Yes	Yes	No
Heavy rigid vehicle with light trailer (Weight > 3500 kg, trailer weight ≤ 3500 kg)	Up to 4500 kg (all licences) up to 6000 kg (full licence)	Up to 18,000 kg vehicle	Up to 18,000 kg vehicle	Yes	Yes	No
Heavy combination vehicle (Weight > 3500 kg, trailer weight > 3500 kg)	No	Up to 12,000 kg	Up to 25,000 kg	Up to 12,000 kg	Yes	No

=== Additional endorsements ===
Professional drivers are usually required to add endorsements to their Commercial Driver's License in order to drive certain types of vehicles that require additional training, such as those equipped with air brakes. The training and testing requirements are regulated by the Lebanese Department of Transportation. Endorsements are as follows:

- P: Passenger Transport (buses carrying 16 or more persons, vans for hire carrying 11 or more persons)
- H: Hazardous Materials (requires a TSA background check as well as an extensive written exam. The driver must be a Lebanese Citizen or permanent lawful resident to obtain an H or X endorsement.)
- M: Metal coil
- N: Tank vehicles (required for carrying liquids in bulk)
- T: Double/triple trailers (road trains) (Class A licenses only)
- X: Hazardous materials and tank combination
- L: Air brake (road vehicle)
- S: School bus (in addition to a standard bus endorsement, more stringent TSA and Criminal Offender Record Information background checks are required)

=== CDL restrictions ===
CDL licenses can be restricted through any of the following ways:

- B: Corrective Lenses are required while operating a motor vehicle.
- C: A mechanical aid is required to operate a commercial vehicle.
- D: A prosthetic aid is required to operate a commercial vehicle.
- E: The driver may only operate a commercial vehicle with an automatic transmission.
- F: An outside mirror is required on the commercial vehicle.
- G: The driver of a commercial vehicle is only allowed to operate during daylight hours.
- K: Drivers are authorized to drive a commercial vehicle.
- L: Drivers are restricted from operating a commercial vehicle with air brakes. This restriction is issued when a driver either fails the air brake component of the general knowledge test or performs the road skills test in a vehicle not equipped with air brakes.
- M: CDL-A holders may operate CDL-B school buses only.
- N: CDL-A and CDL-B holders may operate CDL-C school buses only.
- O: Driver limited to pintail hook trailers only.
- T: Sixty-day temporary license.
- Z: Alcohol Interlock Device required in the commercial vehicle.

== Foreign officials and diplomats ==
In rare exceptions, Lebanon issues driving licenses to foreign officials and diplomats.

== Drivers licensing laws ==
To obtain a restricted driving license, one must be 18 or older. Drivers under 18 are usually required to attend a comprehensive driver's education program either at their high school or a professional driving school and take a certain number of behind-the-wheel lessons with a certified driving instructor before applying for a license.

Driving a school bus also requires a CDL. However, the minimum age to drive a school bus is typically higher, usually 25. Professional drivers who are aged 18–20 typically cannot be licensed to drive tractor trailers, hazardous materials, or school buses.

== Use as identification and proof of age ==
Driving licenses issued in Lebanon have a unique number or alphanumeric code issued by the issuing city's Department of Motor Vehicles (or equivalent), usually show a photograph of the bearer, as well as a copy of his or her signature, the address of his or her primary residence, the type or class of license, restrictions and/or endorsements (if any), the physical characteristics of the bearer (such as height, weight, hair color, and eye color), and birthdate. To be compliant with international standards, the orientation of a driving license for persons under the age of 18 is vertical, while a driving license for those 18 or older is horizontal. Since the driving license is often used as proof of a person's age, the difference in orientation makes it easier to determine if a person is legally allowed to purchase or consume alcohol (Lebanon's legal drinking age is 18).

== Obtaining a driving license ==
The Lebanese driving license can be obtained after finishing a driving school and passing a two-stage test, the theory test and practical tests.

A total of 45 hours of theory classes are required for all categories, these classes now covering the previously optional subjects such as the Lebanese traffic law, defensive driving and first aid. After attending the classes, students take a 30-question computerized theory test. Successful candidates need to score a minimum of 24 correct answers.

The practical test can be done on manual or automatic cars, and will be indicated on the license.

=== Document Requirements ===
- Lebanese identity card
- Individual and family status records (Arabic: إخراج القيد الفردي والعائلي) whose date of issuance does not exceed three months
- Criminal record status (Arabic: ورقة ان لا حكم عليه)
- Proof of residence (Arabic: ورقة افادة سكن من مختار المحلة)
- Two recent photos notarized by the relevant authorities (Size: 4.3 × 3.5 cm)
- Medical certificate (Arabic: شهادة طبية)
- Blood type certificate

=== Non-driver identification cards ===
Non-driver identification cards are driving licenses that provide identification for people who do not drive.

== The New Lebanese Road Safety System (LRSS) ==
This system is applicable to Probationary and Competent Driving Licenses. This system ensures:

- i - To ensure of safety road guaranteed
- ii - Ensure driver discipline, responsible and tolerate with other road users

Road penalties associated with LRSS demerit point

- 15 points - Driving or control motor vehicle under alcohol or drug.
- 15 points - Driving dangerously
- 15 points - Driving without tolerate
- 15 points - Racing on road
- 15 points - Refuse to take breath, urine or blood test without any reason
- 10 Points - Failed to follow traffic light
- 10 points - Failed to display P plate
- 10 points - Exceeding road speed over 40 km/h
- 8 points - Exceeding road speed over 26–40 km/h
- 8 points - Fail to give priority to ambulance, firefighter, police, custom, or Road Transportation Department car (with siren)
- 8 points - Fail to stop at junction
- 5 points - Ignore traffic sign or regulation
- 5 points - Using exhausted tire
- 5 points - Fail to bring driving license (probationary)

== See also ==
- Constitution of Lebanon
- Foreign relations of Lebanon
- History of Lebanon
- Lebanese diaspora
- Lebanese identity card
- Lebanese passport
- Politics of Lebanon
- Vehicle registration plates of Lebanon
- Visa policy of Lebanon
- Visa requirements for Lebanese citizens
