= Vehicle registration plates of Lebanon =

Republic of Lebanon
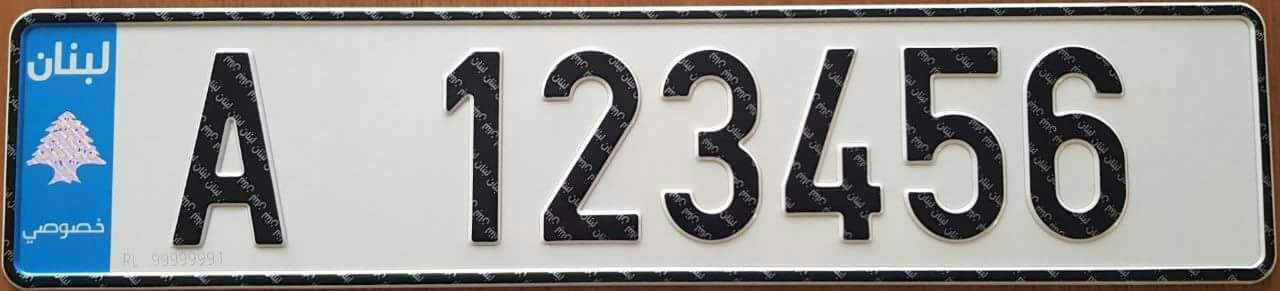
- Lebanese regular legal standard number plate (EU sized).
- Country: Lebanon
- Country code: RL

Current series
- Size: No specified size
- Serial format: A 123456
- Colour (front): Black on white
- Colour (rear): Black on white

Vehicle registration plates of Lebanon generally have a blue bar to the left like in European Union countries (except without the 12 golden stars) if the plate is European standard. The blue bar is to the top if the plate is North American standard. The blue bar consists of the name of Lebanon in Arabic (لبنان), the Lebanese Cedar tree in the middle, and the vehicle's classification all in white. The rest of the plate is white, with a Latin letter representing the vehicle's registration area and Arabic numbers next to the letter in bold. Different colors represent different usages (e.g., red ones are used by taxis and public transport, green ones are for rental vehicles, etc.). If the plate has the letter J, then the car is owned by a judge. If the plate has the letters MP or AG then the car belongs to a minister or parliament member.

== Codes ==
The following style is 382445 with numbers followed with Latin letters. P is town registered to:

Private Vehicles
Letter	Colour	Town	Governorates	Image (EU Size)	Image (US Size)	Notes
A	Blue					Code A added to Numbers previously without Code. These correspond to numbers put on cars before the 1998 series. They are the most valuable numbers, i.e. "A 1000" would correspond to the number of the 1000th car registered in Lebanon, giving the code a sense of vanity.
B	Blue	Beirut	Beirut			
Y	Blue	Aley	Mount Lebanon			
G	Blue	Jounieh	Mount Lebanon			
N	Blue	Nabatiye	Nabatieh			
O	Blue	Ouzai	Mount Lebanon			
S	Blue	Sidon	South Lebanon			
T	Blue	Tripoli	North Lebanon			
K	Blue	Baalbek	Beqaa			Not in use
Z	Blue	Zahleh	Beqaa			
J	Blue	Judicial	N/A			Serving judges in Lebanon each have their own unique license plate which can be placed on their private vehicles.
R	Blue	Religious Official	N/A			Higher-ranking religious officials from the 18 recognised sects in Lebanon, like judges, have their own unique license plate.
MP	Blue	Member of Parliament	N/A			Temporarily given to in-office members of the Lebanese Parliament, from 1 to 128, to be placed on their private vehicles. Numbers are returned to the government at the end of their term.
M	Blue	N/A	N/A			Motorcycles and privately owned commercial vehicles such as pickup trucks and panel vans/vans with no rear seats. As of 2019, non-6-digit "M" numbers can be put on private vehicles.
Public, Governmental, and Service Vehicles
C	Purple	N/A	N/A			Consular License Plate
D	Orange	N/A	N/A			Diplomatic License Plate (Contains Country Code and Car Number)
M	Red	N/A	N/A			Vehicles owned by companies or institutions (Arabic: مؤسسات)
P	Red	N/A	N/A			Public Transportation Vehicles (Previously registered under the letter M and only distinguished with a red background)
M	Yellow	N/A	N/A			Driving Instructor's Vehicle License Plate
M	Green	N/A	N/A			Transit License Plate
M	Brown	N/A	N/A			Temporary License Plate
M	Pink	N/A	N/A			Tourism License Plate

Note: Private and public numbers from 1 to 128 do not exist with any letter code as they are reserved for members of parliament.

== Gallery ==
1945 Series

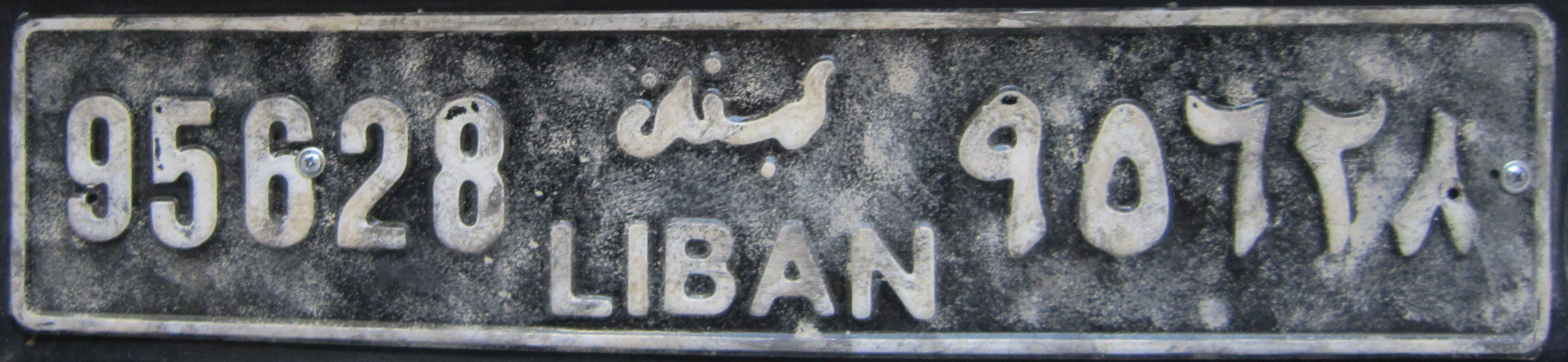
Private Vehicle - European standard

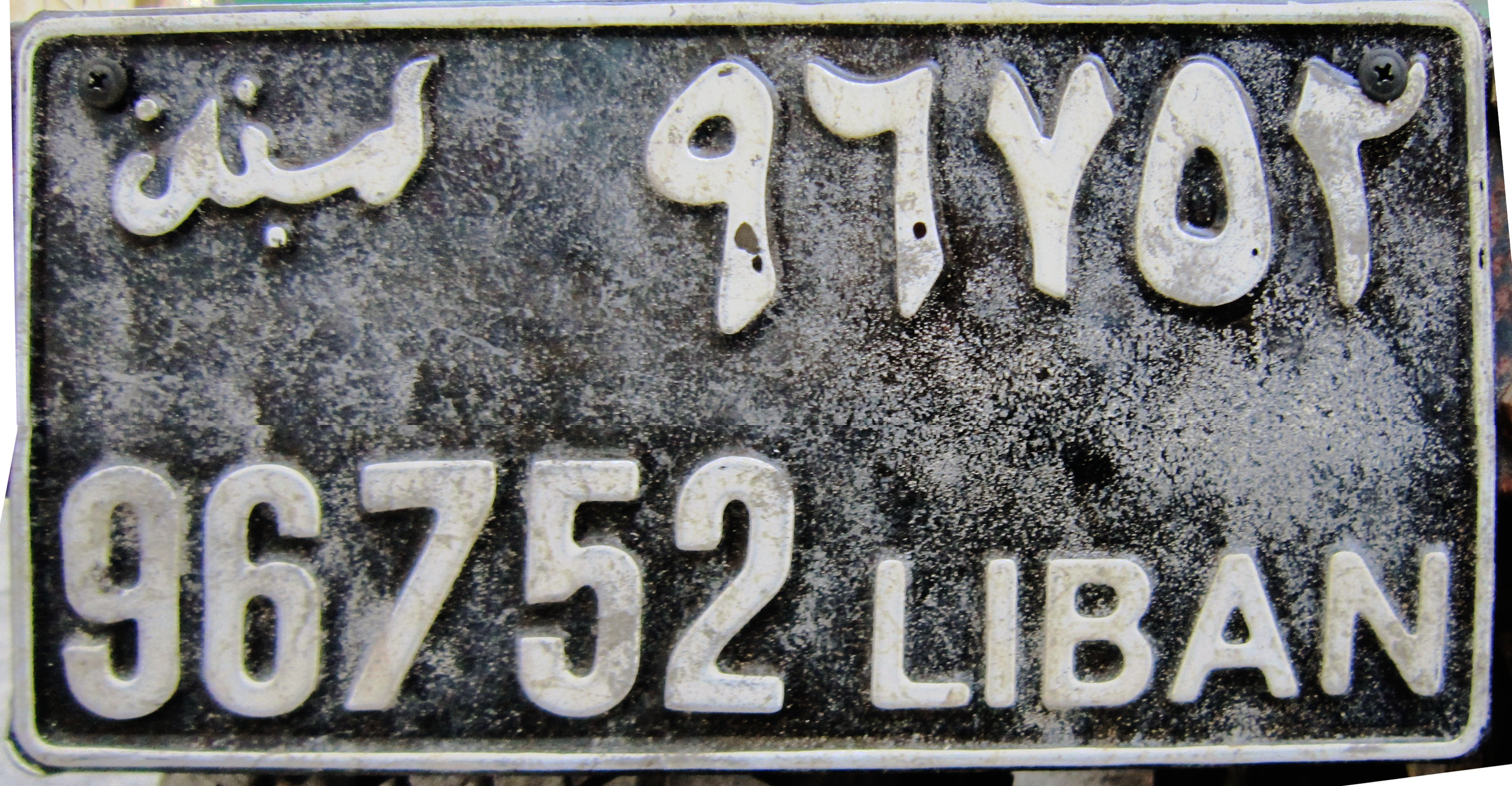
Private Vehicle - North American standard

1998 Series

Private Vehicle - European standard

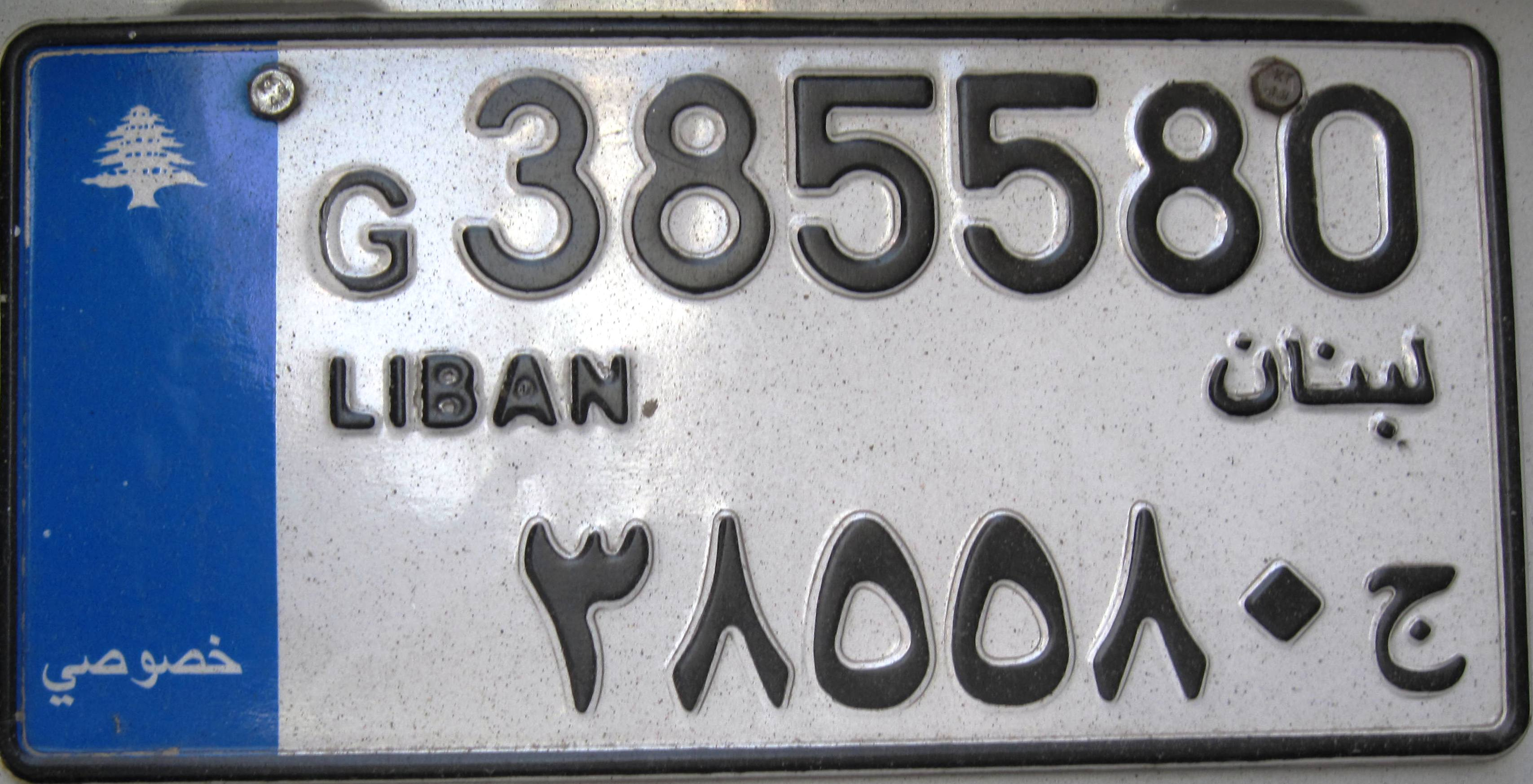
Private Vehicle - North American standard

December 2017 Series

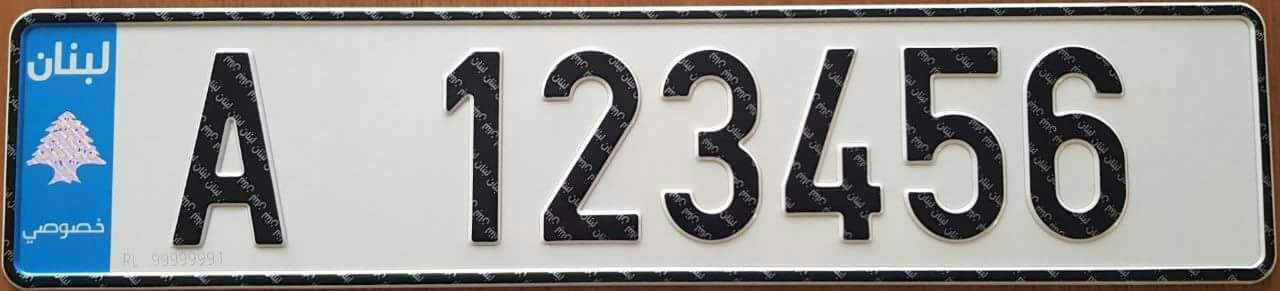
Private Vehicle - European standard

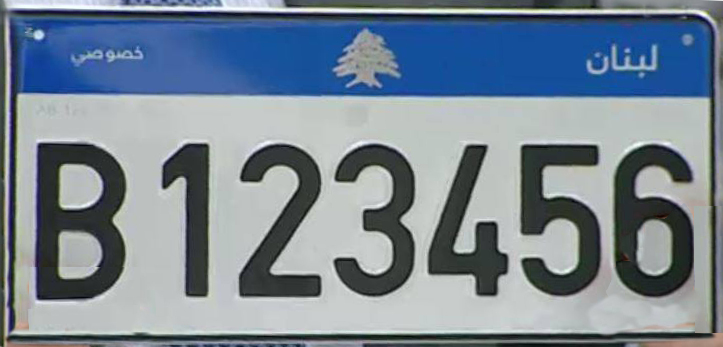
Private Vehicle - North American standard

== See also ==
- Driving licence in Lebanon
- Lebanese identity card
