= 17 October Revolution =

2019–2021 protests in Lebanon

17 October Protests
- Part of the 2018–2024 Arab protests
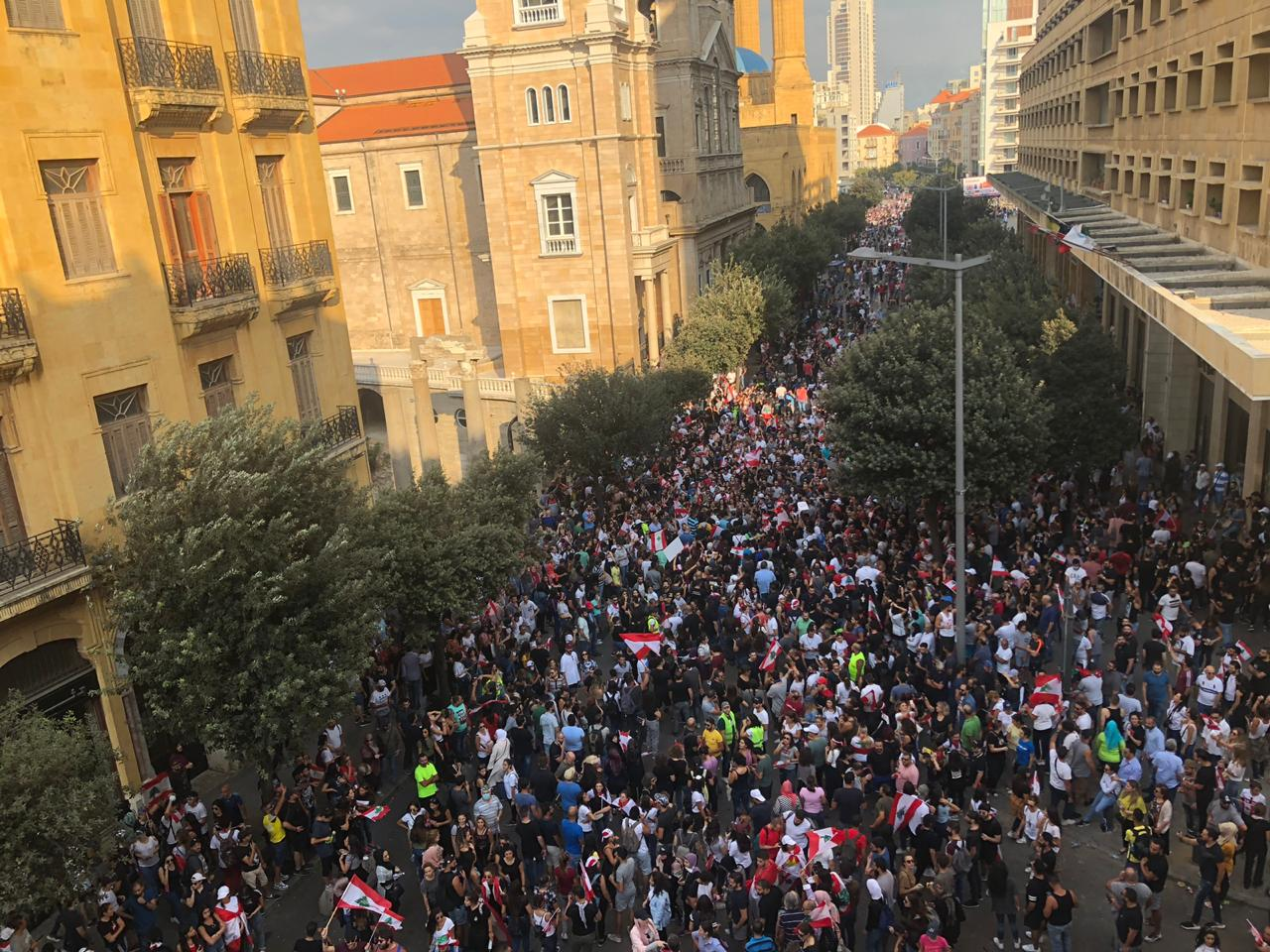
- Protesters outside of Riad Al Solh Square in Beirut on 19 October 2019
- Date: 17 October 2019 – 2021 (mass protests), ongoing civic activism
- Location: Lebanon
- Caused by: Austerity; Political corruption; Interventionism; Liquidity crisis; Recession; Sectarianism; Unemployment
- Methods: Demonstrations; Strike action; Sit-ins; Civil resistance; Barricades; Internet activism
- Result: Resignation of Prime Minister Saad Hariri; Resignation of Prime Minister Hassan Diab; Resignation of 10 Members of the 2018–2022 Lebanese Parliament; Election of 13 reformist candidates in the 2022 Lebanese parliamentary elections

Parties
Protesters: (no centralized authority): (Lebanon) Individual protesters; (Lebanon) Civil society organizations; (Lebanon) Forces of Change; (Lebanon) Citizens in a State; Lebanese Communist Party; Islamic Group	Political establishment: (Lebanon) Lebanese Government; Hezbollah; Amal; FPM; Future; PSP; SSNP-L; LF; LDP; Marada; Azm; All establishment political parties

Lead figures
Non-centralized leadership	(Lebanon) Joseph Aoun (Since 9 January 2025) (Lebanon) Michel Aoun (17 October 2019 - 31 October 2022) (Lebanon) Nabih Berri (Lebanon) Nawaf Salam (Since 8 February 2025) (Lebanon) Najib Mikati (10 September 2021 - 8 February 2025) (Lebanon) Hassan Diab (21 January 2020 – 10 September 2021) (Lebanon) Saad Hariri (17 October 2019 – 21 January 2020) (Hezbollah) Naim Qassem (Since 29 October 2024) (Hezbollah) Hassan Nasrallah (17 October 2019 - 27 September 2024); Gebran Bassil; Fouad Siniora; Walid Jumblatt; Samir Geagea; Taymur Jumblatt; Riad Salameh; Suleiman Frangieh Jr.

Casualties and losses
11 killed and 1,488+ injured	1 policeman killed and 168 police injured
- 3 civilians killed in related violence 7 killed and 32 wounded in related clashes

Casualties
- Arrested: 70 (released the next day due to lack of reason for arrest)

The 17 October Protests, commonly referred to as the 17 October Revolution or Hirak or Thawrah (Arabic: ثورة 17 تشرين الأول, romanized: thawrat 17 tishrīn al-ʾawwal, lit. '17 October revolution'), were a series of civil protests in Lebanon that began after the Lebanese cabinet announced financial measures on 17 October 2019. These nationwide protests were triggered by planned taxes on gasoline, tobacco, and VoIP calls on applications such as WhatsApp, but quickly expanded into a country-wide condemnation of sectarian rule, the stagnation of the economy, unemployment (which reached 46% in 2018), endemic corruption in the public sector, legislation that was perceived to shield the ruling class from accountability (such as banking secrecy) and failures of the government to provide basic services, such as electricity, water, and sanitation.

The protests created a political crisis in Lebanon, with Prime Minister Saad Hariri tendering his resignation, not demanding any new governmental needs of being the prime minister and echoing protesters' demands for a government of independent specialists. A cabinet headed by Hassan Diab was formed in 2020 but also resigned in the wake of the 2020 Beirut explosion.

Calling for a complete regime change, it was known by its most famous slogan; Kellon Yaani Kellon (Arabic: كلن يعني كلن, lit. 'all of them [the elites] means all of them').

In January 2026 public schools teachers and retired military personnel took to the streets closings roads all over Lebanon and protesting in front of the Lebanese parliament building.

== Background ==
=== Political background ===
According to The Economist, Lebanon's dysfunction and mismanagement which followed the protests originated in the country's sectarian political system codified by the Taif agreement, which took place in 1989. The Taif Agreement enshrines a sect-based political system in which many political offices and parliamentary seats are allocated according to religious affiliation. This system is perceived as exploited by the current Lebanese politicians, many of whom are Lebanese Civil War-era sectarian warlords who still occupy positions of power and enjoy amnesty against accountability. Lebanon consists of various religious factions with 18 different sects. The 18 officially recognized religious groups include four Muslim sects, 12 Christian sects, the Druze sect, and Judaism.

The outbreak of the protests was attributed to the accumulated crises within the preceding weeks in Lebanon. First, in Chouf and Saadiyat, among other places, fires propagated, scorching nearby homes and placing many people in danger. A large portion of greenery was burnt down as a result. The Lebanese government failed to employ its planes to extinguish the fires and had to rely on Cypriot aid. Moreover, the prices of both oil and bread had been increasing as well as the rates of unemployment and poverty nationwide. Since all of these issues were due to a lack of proper governance, the Lebanese people voiced out their opinions over the negative situation.

Furthermore, Lebanese citizens were facing many problems in the preceding years, electricity cuts since 1975, and so obtaining 24-hour electricity in Lebanon has since been dependent on obtaining a deal with the country's "generator mafia", which operates a ring of contraband gasoline power generators that contribute to the high level of air pollution in Lebanese cities. Lebanon has also not had access to drinking water except through purchased bottled water from private companies since the 1975–1990 Lebanese Civil War. Finally, the country suffers from deficient sanitation and sewage infrastructure, which led to the 2015 "garbage crisis" that sparked the 2015–2016 Lebanese protests.

Days before the protests began, a series of about 100 major wildfires in Chouf, Khroub and other Lebanese areas displaced hundreds of people and caused enormous damage to Lebanese wildlife. The Lebanese government failed to deploy its firefighting equipment due to lack of maintenance and had to rely on aid from neighboring Cyprus, Jordan, Turkey and Greece.

Protests started taking place in small numbers around Beirut towards the end of September. Impetus for the revolutionary movement was apparent years before the protests began and was visible in Lebanon's arts and culture scene, as evidenced by pop artist Ragheb Alama's song "Tar Al Balad" in December 2018 and rock singer-songwriter IJK's song "Chedd Halak" in June 2019.

=== Economic background ===
Since 1997, successive governments maintained a pegged exchange rate between the Lebanese pound and United States dollar. Forecasts for the Lebanese economy worsened over the 2010s and by 2019 GDP per capita reached its lowest since 2008 and the debt-to-GDP ratio reached its highest since 2008 at 151%. As a result, international credit rating agencies downgraded the rating of government bonds. The combination of an economic downturn in the import-dependent country with the continuation of its dollar peg saw an increase in the government's budget deficit and reliance on using foreign exchange reserves from the nation's central bank to keep the currency peg. A subsequent dollar shortage in late 2019 further affected the economy, as import businesses and citizens became unable to acquire dollars at the official rate and a black market emerged. The coalition government led by Saad Hariri responded with an austerity program of general tax increases and spending reductions, with the aim to reduce the government deficit while maintaining the peg against the U.S. dollar. The reduction of the national deficit as a condition of a package of US$10.2 billion of loans and US$860 million of grants agreed in 2018 with the World Bank, European Bank for Reconstruction and Development, and Saudi Arabia.

On 1 October, the Central Bank of Lebanon announced an economic strategy that promised to provide dollars to all those companies in the business of importing wheat, gasoline, and pharmaceuticals, so that they could continue their imports. This was considered a short-term solution by economic analysts.

In a cabinet session held on 17 October, the government proposed strategies to increase state revenue for 2020. There were 36 items to be discussed, including the increase of Value Added Tax (VAT) by 2pp by 2021 and an additional 2pp by 2022, making it reach a total of 15%. Additionally, the media reported there were plans of a US$0.20 charge on Voice over Internet Protocol (VoIP) calls, such as ones made on FaceTime, Facebook and WhatsApp. The final session of the budget draft was to be held on 19 October, but was canceled upon the agreement of Prime Minister Saad Hariri and President Michel Aoun.

== 2019 protests ==
=== Beginning ===
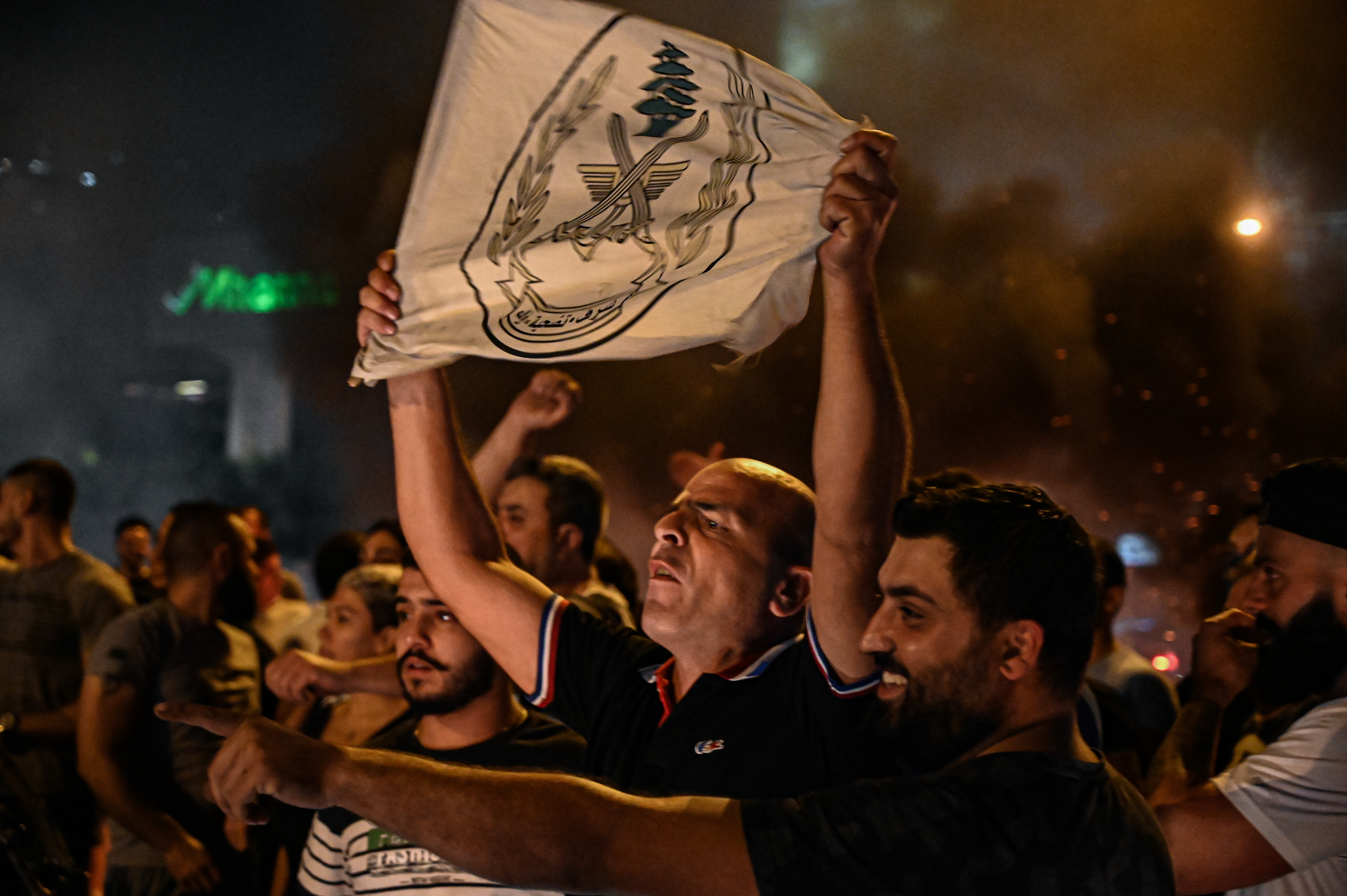
Protests in Antelias on 17 October 2019

On 17 October 2019, approximately 150 civil activists were protesting against the new proposed taxes in and around downtown Beirut, blocking important streets after the first call to protest that was made by Lihaqqi (لِحقّي) . As the Minister of Higher Education Akram Chehayeb and his convoy passed by the area, protesters assembled around his car. One of his bodyguards shot stray bullets into the air, which further enraged the protesters, but no injuries were reported. Walid Joumblatt, the leader of the Progressive Socialist Party, stated that he had spoken to minister Chehayeb- in fact, this minister represents the party in the Lebanese government- and so requested the bodyguards be handed over to the police, as all people are "under the law". A large number of protesters began appearing in Martyrs Square, Nejmeh Square, and Hamra Street, as well as many other regions around Lebanon. As the protests grew bigger, Prime Minister Saad Hariri called a snap cabinet meeting at the request of President Michel Aoun for midday on 18 October. An announcement was also made by Minister of Higher Education Akram Chehayeb that all schools and universities, public or private, would remain closed the next day. The Minister of Telecommunications Mohamad Choucair announced that the "WhatsApp tax" idea had been scrapped at around 11:00PM. Protesters saw the "WhatsApp tax" as the last straw socially, politically and economically, against the entire political class, which was deemed corrupt and in need of immediate ousting.

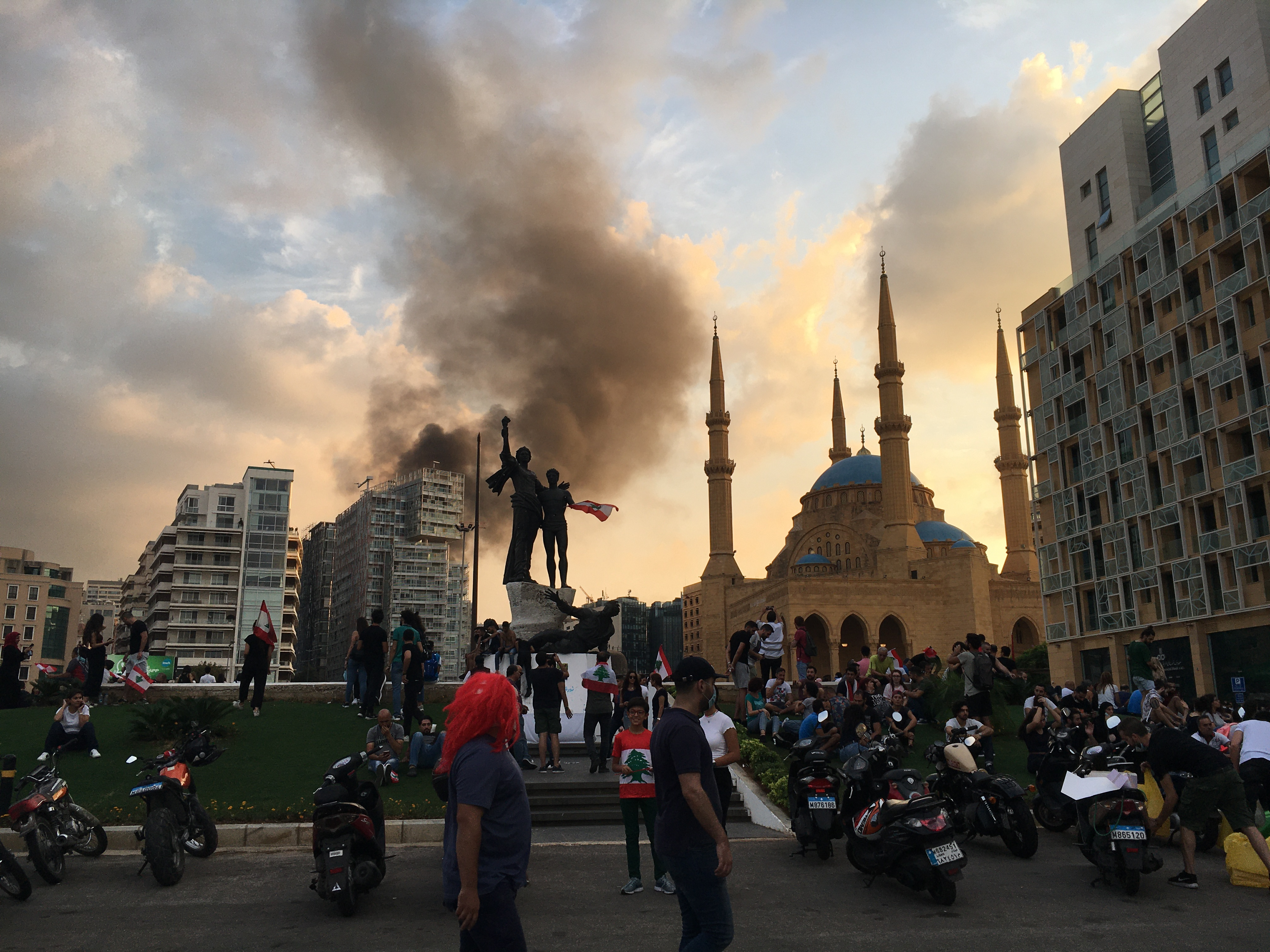
Protests in Martyrs' Square, Beirut on 18 October 2019

Protesters in Nabatiyeh and Tripoli, on 18 October, vandalized the offices of the Hezbollah, Amal Movement, and Free Patriotic Movement political parties in an expression of disillusionment and in protest against perceived government corruption. Other protesters aimed to enter the Serail, which includes the Lebanese Parliament building, but were stopped by the use of tear gas from the Internal Security Forces. protesters created roadblocks on the major roads of the country, using burning tires and trash cans to stop access. Civil servants announced a strike with immediate effect through League of Public Sector Employees, arguing that the proposed reforms would "undermine the rights of employees and pensioners in particular". A cabinet meeting was due to be held in the afternoon, but ministers of the Lebanese Forces announced that they would not attend. The leader of the Forces, Samir Geagea, called for the resignation of the Prime Minister, due to the "resounding failure to halt the deterioration of the [country's] economic situation". After this announcement, the cabinet meeting was canceled by the Prime Minister. Leader of the Progressive Socialist Party, Walid Jumblatt, called for a "calm and peaceful" move against President Michel Aoun's mandate, and organized rallies in Aley, Bhamdoun, and Baakline to voice their opinions. Pierre Issa of the National Bloc voiced a similar opinion, calling for a "government of specialists, a government reduced from public safety". However, he criticized the involvement of political parties within the protests and argued it should remain something for the citizens to do. In the evening, Prime Minister Saad Hariri addressed the nation, giving his "partners in government" 72 hours to support the reforms. If they did not come to an agreement, he suggested he would take a "different approach". He tweeted "72 hours..." right after the delivered speech.

=== First week: 19–24 October ===
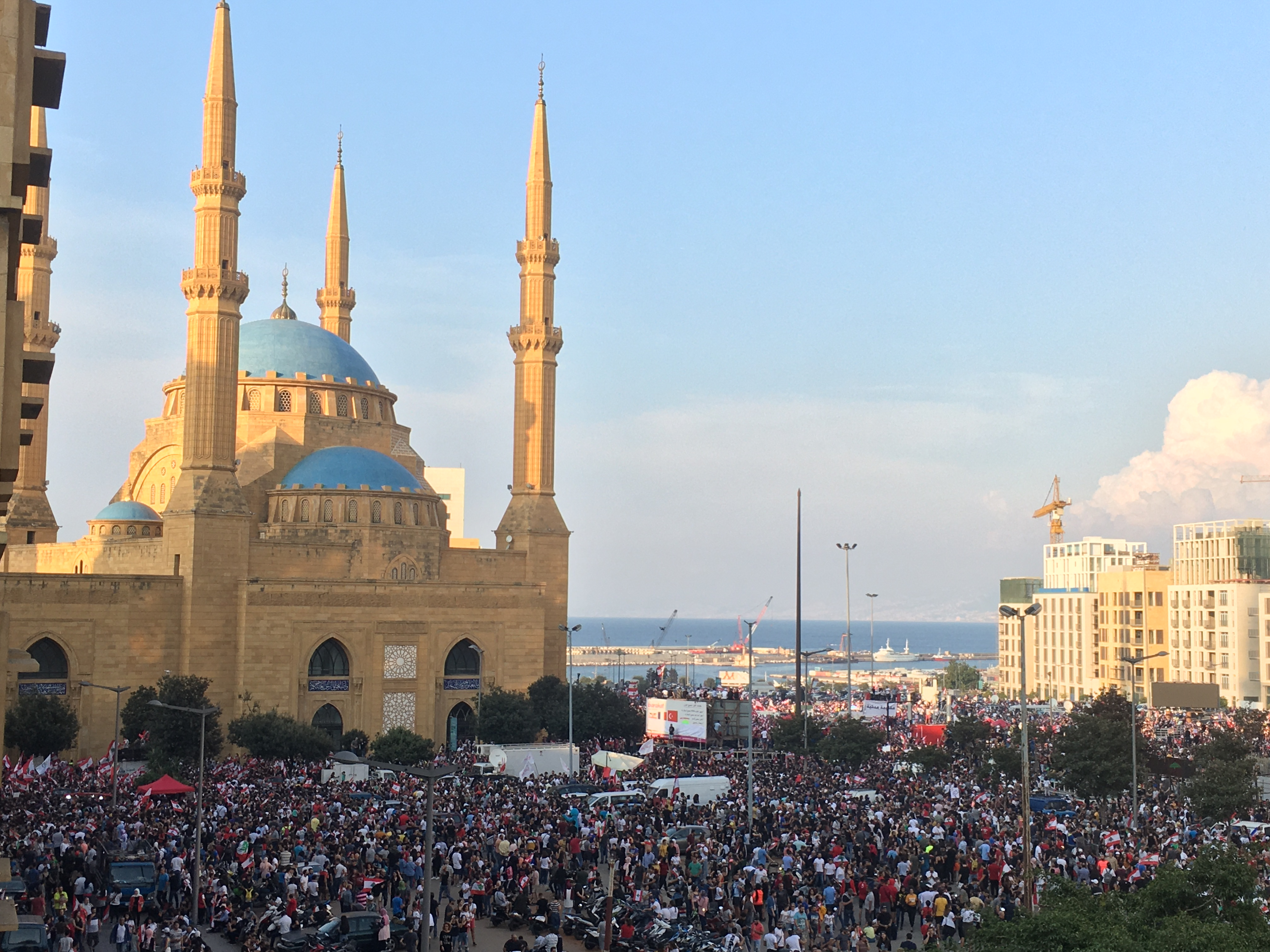
Protesters in Beirut. Mohammad Al-Amin Mosque, 20 October 2019

Lebanese national Hussein Al-Attar was shot and killed during a protest on 19 October 2019. Former MP Mosbah al-Ahdab's bodyguards fired on protesters, no one was killed, but four were injured. The General Secretary of Hezbollah, Hassan Nasrallah, addressed the nation in the morning, speaking against the imposed taxes. However, he indicated that Hezbollah was against the government resigning and instead asked citizens to divert blame from Hariri's cabinet to the previous government, which was also to blame for the state of the economy. As the protests carried on throughout the day, there were reports of Amal Movement militants harassing and opening fire on protesters in Tyre.

Protests were held around major European cities, as well as in North America and Australia, showing solidarity with the protesters in Lebanon. Due to the mounting pressure from protesters, the Lebanese Forces announced their resignation from the cabinet. Samir Geagea, their leader, had previously blamed his opponents for "obstructing the necessary reforms," but since declared his "lack of confidence in the current cabinet." His party held four seats within the government: Minister of Labor Camille Abou Sleiman, Minister of Administrative Development May Chidiac, Deputy Prime Minister Ghassan Hasbani, and Minister of Social Affairs Richard Kouyumjian.

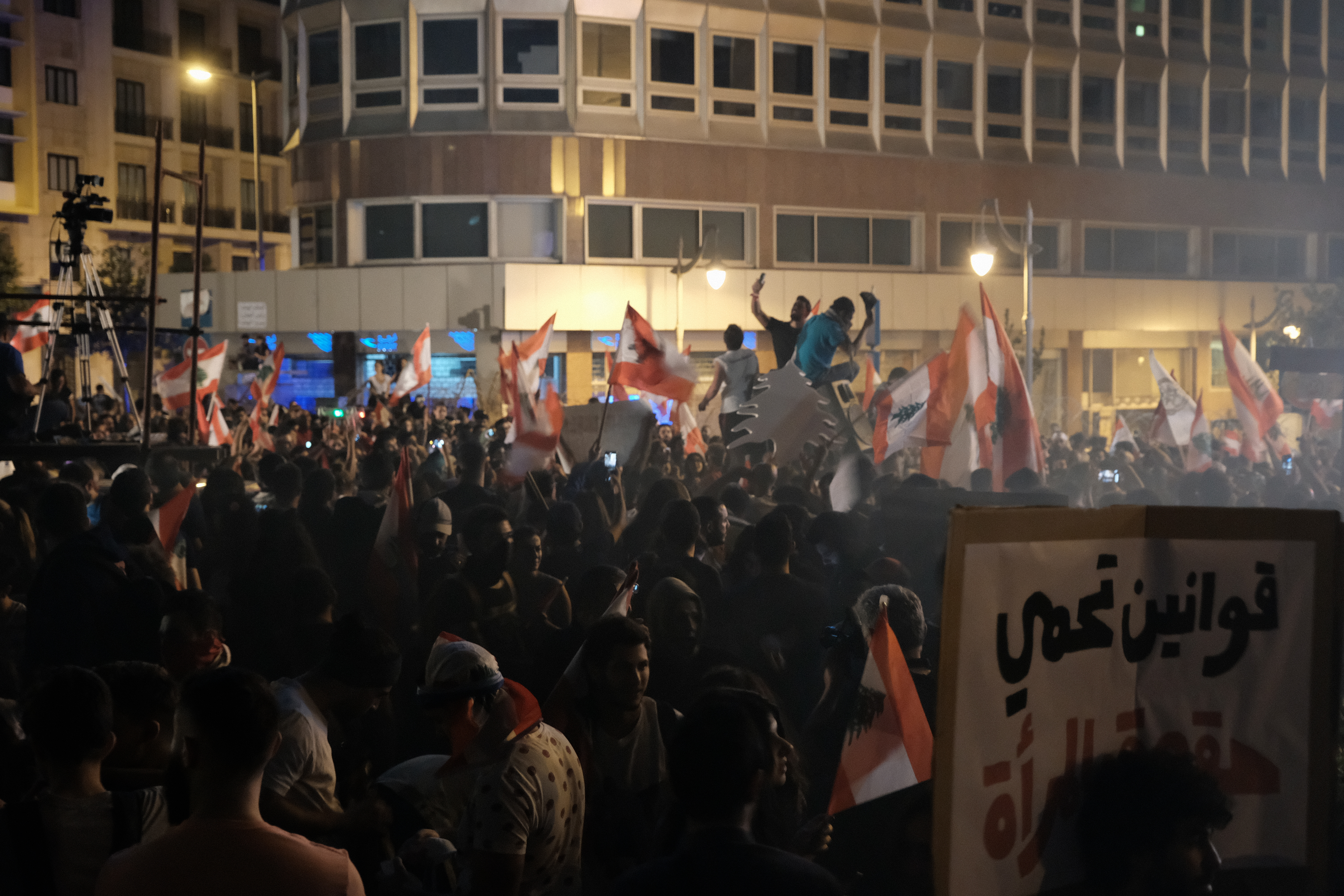
Protesters in Riad el Solh square, Beirut. 22 October 2019.

On 20 October, hundreds of thousands of protesters gathered in locations throughout the country, making it the largest demonstrations since 2005. Gunfire was heard outside the Tripoli office of Firas Al-Ali, an associate of Hariri. None were injured with the clash, and security forces were quick to act. At 6:00 pm, protesters across the country united to sing the national anthem together.

Video of protesters in Tyre cheering a female activist singer on 22 October 2019

On 21 October, a general strike was called across the country demanding an end to the country's economic problems. Some protesters began clearing away demonstration debris in Beirut after a social media call to keep the streets tidy and clear. In the afternoon, an emergency cabinet meeting was held. After the meeting, Prime Minister Hariri held a press conference in which he announced various economic reforms including halving the salaries of legislators and members of parliament, reducing the deficit by about US$3.4 billion in 2020 with the help of the Lebanese central bank and the banking sector, distributing financial aid to families living in poverty and giving US$160 million in housing loans. These proposals were unsuccessful at quelling protests. At night, several motorcyclists hoisting Hezbollah and Amal Movement were recorded heading towards the protests in central Beirut but were intercepted by the Lebanese Army. Soon thereafter, Hezbollah and the Amal Movement denied any involvement with the motorcyclists.

Hariri met on 22 October with ambassadors from the United States, Russia, France, the United Kingdom, Germany, Italy, and the European Union, along with representatives from China, the United Nations, and the Arab League. Hariri discussed planned reforms and stressed the importance of peaceful expression from the protesters. The representatives, who form the International Support Group for Lebanon, expressed support for economic reforms and protection of protesters, but urged the leaders of Lebanon to engage in open dialogue with the country's citizens.

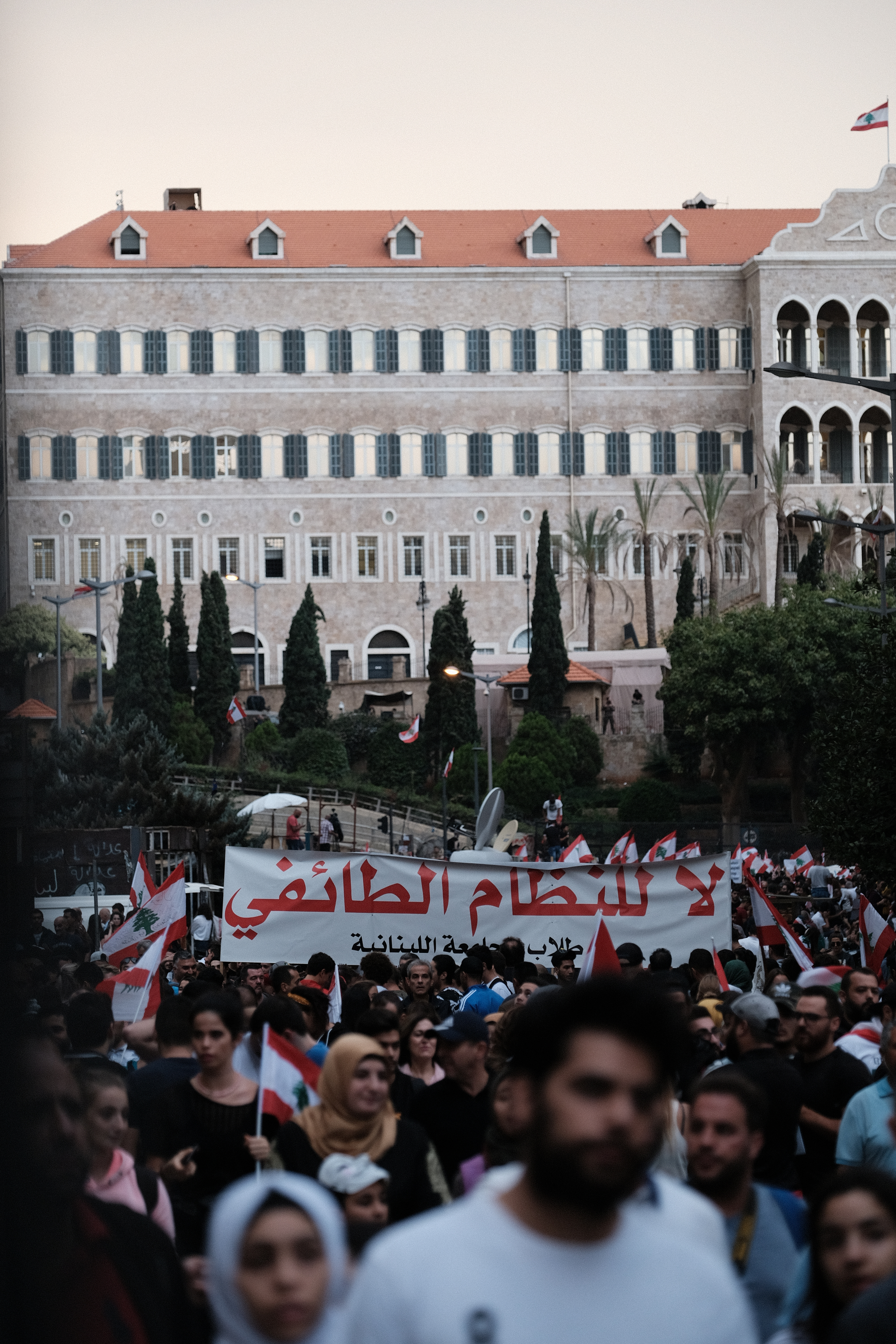
Protesters in front of the Grand Serial, Beirut, carrying a sign that reads "No to Sectarian Rule". 23 October 2019.

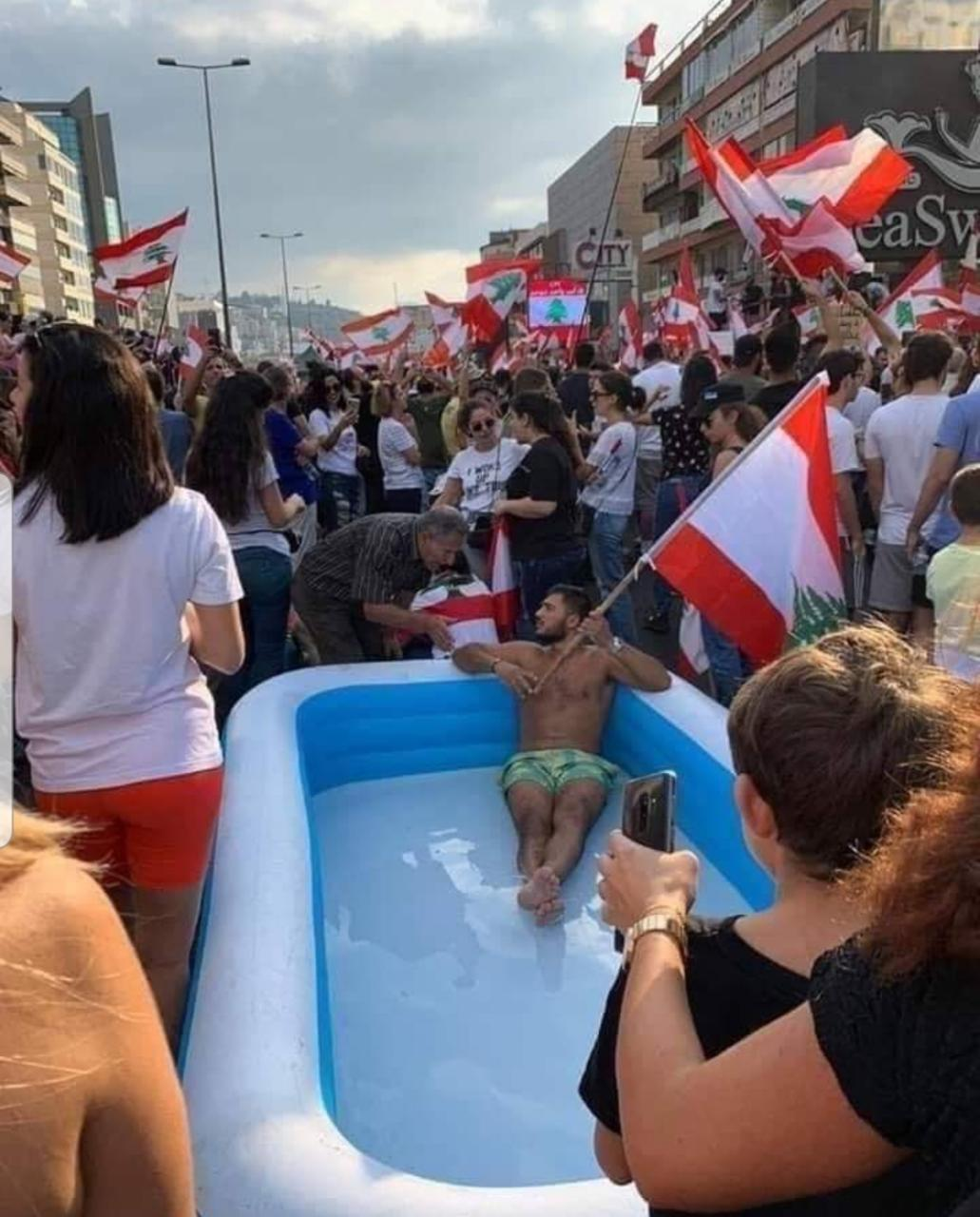
Protesters in Zouk Mosbeh, 23 October 2019

On 23 October, Hariri held a meeting with the ministerial committee in charge of financial and economic reforms, discussing a draft law on the recovery of public money and requesting suggestions on it from the Supreme Judicial Council within ten days. In the evening, Hariri also held a meeting with members of the Progressive Socialist Party to discuss the latest developments in the country. Sheikh Akl of the Lebanese Druze community called for government dialogue to safeguard the rights of liberty, security and stability.

President Michel Aoun addressed the population on 24 October, stating his willingness to hold a dialogue with the protesters and find the best solution forward. He supported Hariri's reforms but did confirm a need to "review the current government" within the "state institutions", and not through protesting. Hariri supported this review through Lebanon's "constitutional mechanisms", but the protesters rejected any calls for dialogue until the government has resigned.

=== Second week: 25–31 October ===
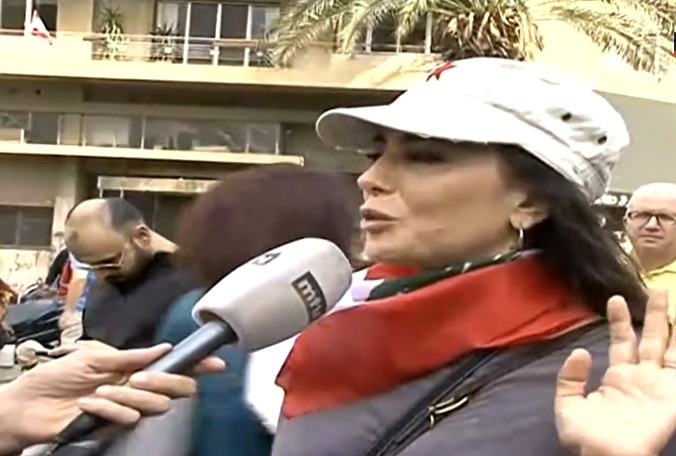
Lebanese director Nadine Labaki during her participation in the protests, 28 April 2019.

Despite calls for dialogue from President Aoun, protests and road blocks continued on 25 October 2019. Small scuffles broke out in central Beirut between protesters and Hezbollah supporters. One protester was injured. A report by Standard & Poor's downgraded its credit assessment of Lebanon to "CreditWatch negative" due to the government's low creditworthiness and economic pressures relating to the reforms. The country's banks remained closed. Hezbollah supporters again clashed with protesters in downtown Beirut, chanting in support of Hezbollah's General Secretary, Hassan Nasrallah. Nasrallah held a speech in the evening, calling his supporters to leave the streets. Within this speech, he praised the protesters for achieving economic reforms, but suggested that they were being exploited by local and foreign agents to start a civil war within the country. Nasrallah also strongly suggested that the protests are part of an Israeli and American plot.

A security meeting was held on 26 October in Yarzeh to discuss how the safety and free movement of protesters could be ensured. Lebanese Forces leader Samir Geagea once more criticized the lack of response from the government towards the protesters' concerns. Meanwhile, thousands of Lebanese gathered in over thirty cities around the world on 26 and 27 October including Sydney, Paris, Houston and London in a show of support.

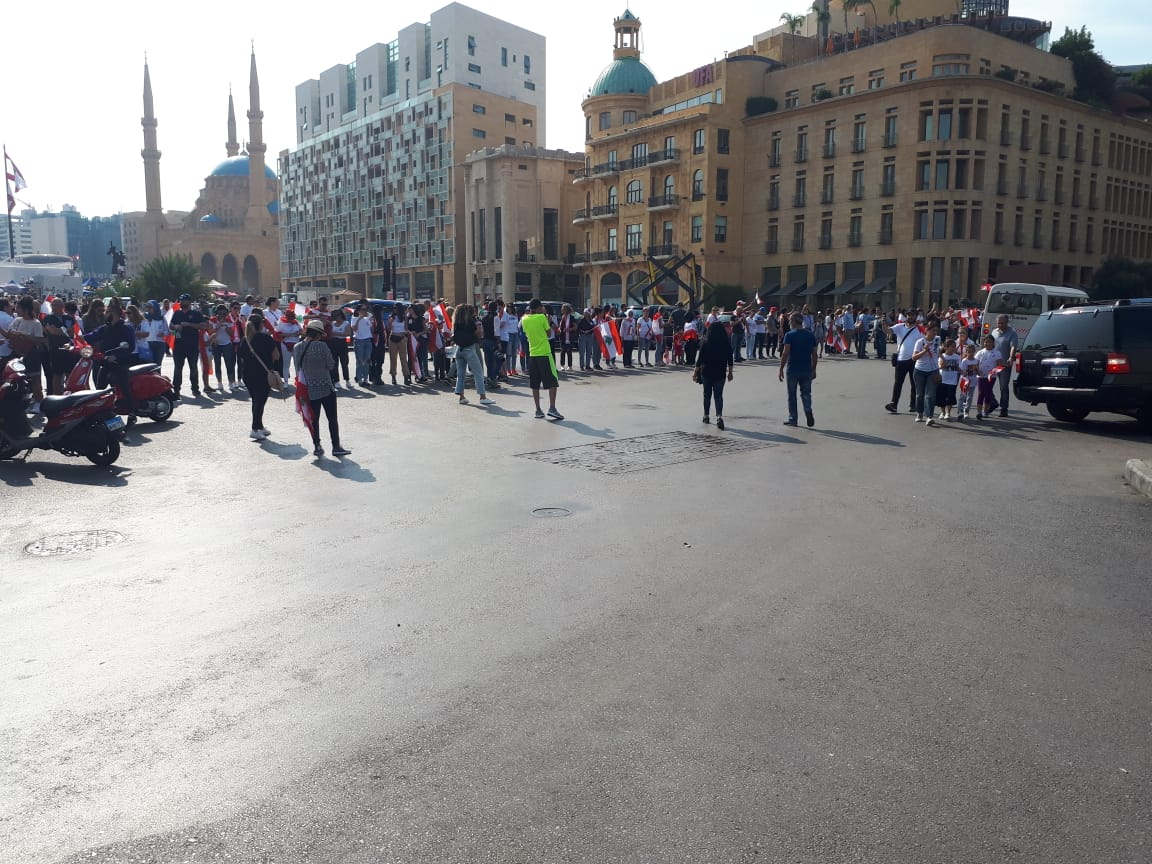
Human Chain in Martyrs' Square, Beirut on 27 October 2019

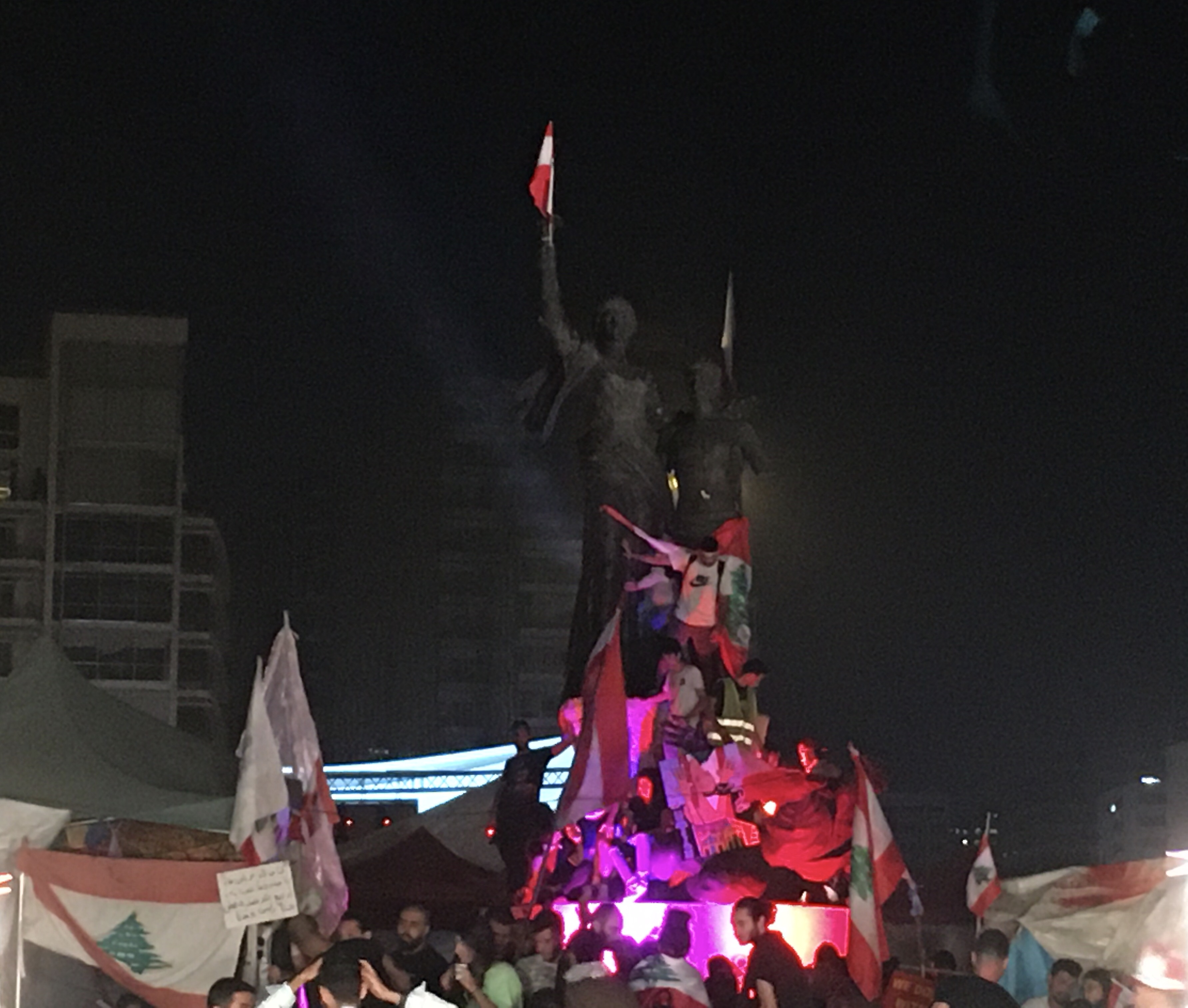
Tents in Martyrs' Square, Beirut on 27 October 2019

Tens of thousands of individuals took part in a "human chain" which was held on 27 October at the coastlines from the Northern city of Tripoli to the southern city of Tyre – encompassing 171 km (106 mi) – organized with the intention to show the unity of the Lebanese people. The Maronite Patriarch Bechara Boutros al-Rahi during a Sunday sermon in Bkerké considered that the people are living their positive and reformist revolution. Pope Francis addressed the Lebanese people expressing their struggle in the face of challenges and social, moral and economic problems of the country, expressing that he is praying that Lebanon can continue to be a place of peaceful coexistence, and urging the Lebanese government to listen to the concerns of the people.

Black-clad Hezbollah and Amal Movement supporters attacked protesters in Beirut on 29 October, tearing down and setting fire to the tents set up by the protesters, throwing plastic chairs, and beating anti-government protesters. Many among the angry mob chanted: "God, Nasrallah, and the whole Dahyeh," in reference to the southern suburb that is a stronghold of the Iranian-backed militant group. They also chanted, "Shia, Shia", as a reverential reference to the country's Shiite Muslim sect. The Hezbollah and Amal Movement supporters also attacked TV crew members and destroyed live broadcasting equipment for the MTV (Lebanon) and Al Jadeed television channels, claiming that they were upset at the roadblocks and insults to their leader. Public squares across Beirut filled with protesters shortly after. Prime Minister Saad Hariri announced his resignation in a televised address on the afternoon of 29 October. Several hours after the resignation of the Prime Minister, celebrations swept the nation with demonstrators cautiously welcoming the resignation celebrated through fireworks, songs, and releasing flagged colored balloons.

On 30 October, tear gas was fired at protesters in the northern district of Akkar by the Lebanese Army trying to reopen the roads. Protesters also blocked roads in the southern city of Sidon and Bekaa Valley. In Central Beirut, dozens of protesters blocked the "Ring Bridge" while a big crowd returned to Tripoli's al-Nour Square to protest. The Lebanese Army intervened in many regions to prevent escalation. Later that evening a statement released from the Presidential Office said that Lebanese President Michel Aoun will address the nation the next day.

President Aoun delivered a speech on 31 October in which he spoke about Lebanon's economic and financial crisis. He also spoke about his commitment to fighting corruption, ensuring political stability, eliminating terrorists, and the return of Syrian refugees within the country. He also promised the new government will be made up of specialists instead of political loyalists. Protesters took to the streets and blocked roads across the country almost immediately after President Aoun's address to the nation, demanding early parliamentary elections and the formation of a technocratic government. Demonstrators shut off roads in cities nationwide – including Sidon, Bekaa, and Khaldeh – with burning tires or by the sheer volume of protesters. In Tripoli, thousands of protesters started to gather at Al-Nour Square while in Beirut, protesters blocked the George Haddad highway which connects the waterfront road to the "Ring Bridge". The Lebanese Army and riot police were deployed across the country in an effort to reopen the roads.

=== Third week: 1–7 November ===
Lebanon's banks reopened on 1 November 2019, after two weeks of closure, the longest bank closure in the nation's history. "Unofficial" capital controls were imposed by individual banks to prevent a bank run, with personal withdrawals being limited to US$3,000 per week or per month depending on individual banks. Corporate banking activity was similarly heavily restricted, and international bank transfers from Lebanon were halted almost completely, subject to manual per-transfer approval. Hezbollah's Secretary General Hassan Nasrallah offered a public speech in which he stated that Hezbollah feared a government overthrow, due to the consequent "vacuum" Lebanon would experience. Nasrallah's then-latest speech was perceived to be unclear on whether Hezbollah supported or opposed the nationwide revolutionary movement. Nasrallah again shed doubt on the motivations of the protesters during his speech, implying that they were being manipulated by foreign influences. As Lebanese schools universities remained closed during the protests, public teach-ins and debates, organized by secular political groups and advocacy organizations (Beirut Madinati, Libaladi, Lihaqqi and others) were offered in Beirut.

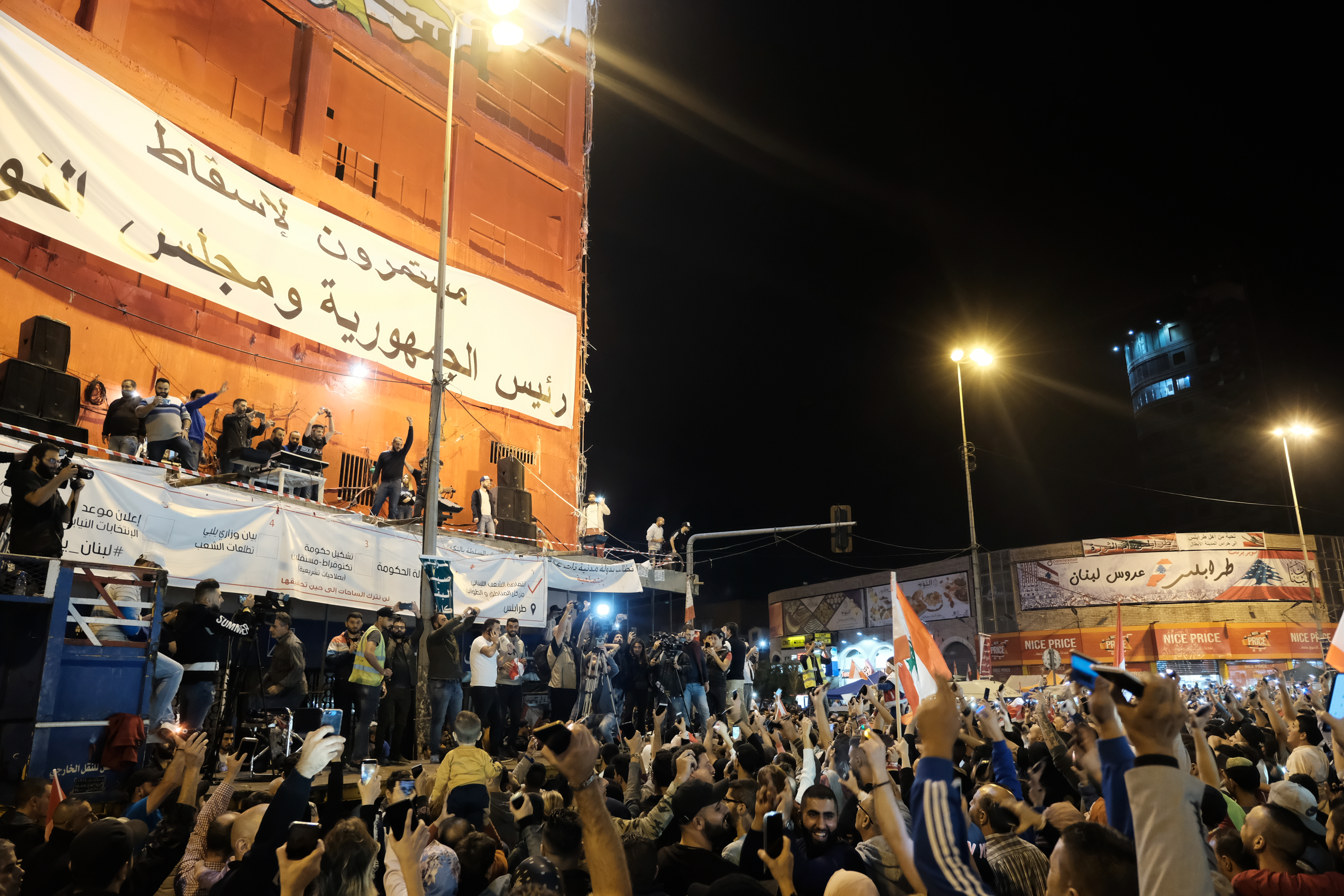
Protest in Tripoli, Lebanon, a city that was recognized as being a central source of energy for the protest movement. 2 November 2019.

On 3 November, thousands of Lebanese Free Patriotic Movement supporters attended a protest in support of President Michel Aoun, the founder of the party. During the protest, FPM leader Gebran Bassil made a personal statement for the first time in over 13 days. Bassil claimed "We should block roads for MPs who refuse corruption-combating laws, politicians who escape accountability and judges who do not implement the law." He also demanded lifting banking secrecy on political officials' accounts and insisting accountability, as well as a return of misused or stolen public funds. In the afternoon, tens of thousands of anti-government protesters flooded the streets across Lebanon in a "Sunday of unity". Protesters gathered for the third consecutive Sunday since mass anti-government demonstrations began on 17 October, filling the streets and central squares of major cities including Beirut, Tripoli and Tyre. Dozens of main roads were closed by burning tires, mounts of sand, and by the sheer amount of protesters, despite an ongoing threat of violence from political-party opposition. Acts of violence from party rivals consisted around Lebanon, such as the attacks on protesters in Beirut blocking public roads. These attacks were presumed to be affiliated with Hezbollah.

A candlelight vigil was held on 4 November in Baalbek in memorial of those who have perished in the Lebanese protest, while physical tensions from road blocking persisted in Beirut.

On 5 November, some students of American University of Science and Technology in Beirut showed attendance in protest and were met with harsh engagement from soldiers of the Lebanese Armed Forces. General Directorate of General Security officers were recorded verbally threatening students that were recording the protests. Protesters in Nabatieh, shut down companies such as OGERO, Liban Post, Banque du Liban and several banks despite state-exerted political pressure towards the protesters in this region. Protesters were present outside electrical company buildings, frustrated with decades of inconsistent power and common outages.

Thousands of students across Lebanon protested on 6 November in front of universities and schools refusing to attend classes until their demands are met. Several student-led movements have been organized since the start of the protests, in demand of a financial student contract, the reversal of the decision to charge tuition fees to the dollar currency in some universities, independent student councils in each university, and a well-funded Lebanese University. On the national scale, they have been asking for social, political, and economic reform, in hopes of finding respectable job prospects after graduation without nepotism or sect bias. Pension and retirement plans are also being demanded, as well as proper health care coverage. In the afternoon, protesters began to gradually grow across Lebanon and started protesting by the thousands in front of key governmental and private institutions and forced some of them to close their doors.

=== Fourth week: 8–14 November ===
It was reported on 9 November 2019 that the dollar-rationing policies implemented by Lebanese banks were at risk of causing major shortages and price hikes in gasoline, petrol, food, and other vital supplies. Suleiman Haroun, the head of the Lebanese Syndicate of Hospitals, said that medical stocks in the country "will not last more than a month" unless a solution is found. During the weekend, news spread of a planned parliamentary legislative session on 12 November that would include a proposed general amnesty law, which could grant current and past members protection against prosecution for crimes such as corruption and misuse of public funds. In response, protesters called for a general strike to be held on the same day, and published a list of demands which included bolstering guarantees for a speedy trial, working towards a solution for the economic crisis, guaranteeing the independence of the judiciary, and investigating the misuse of public funds.

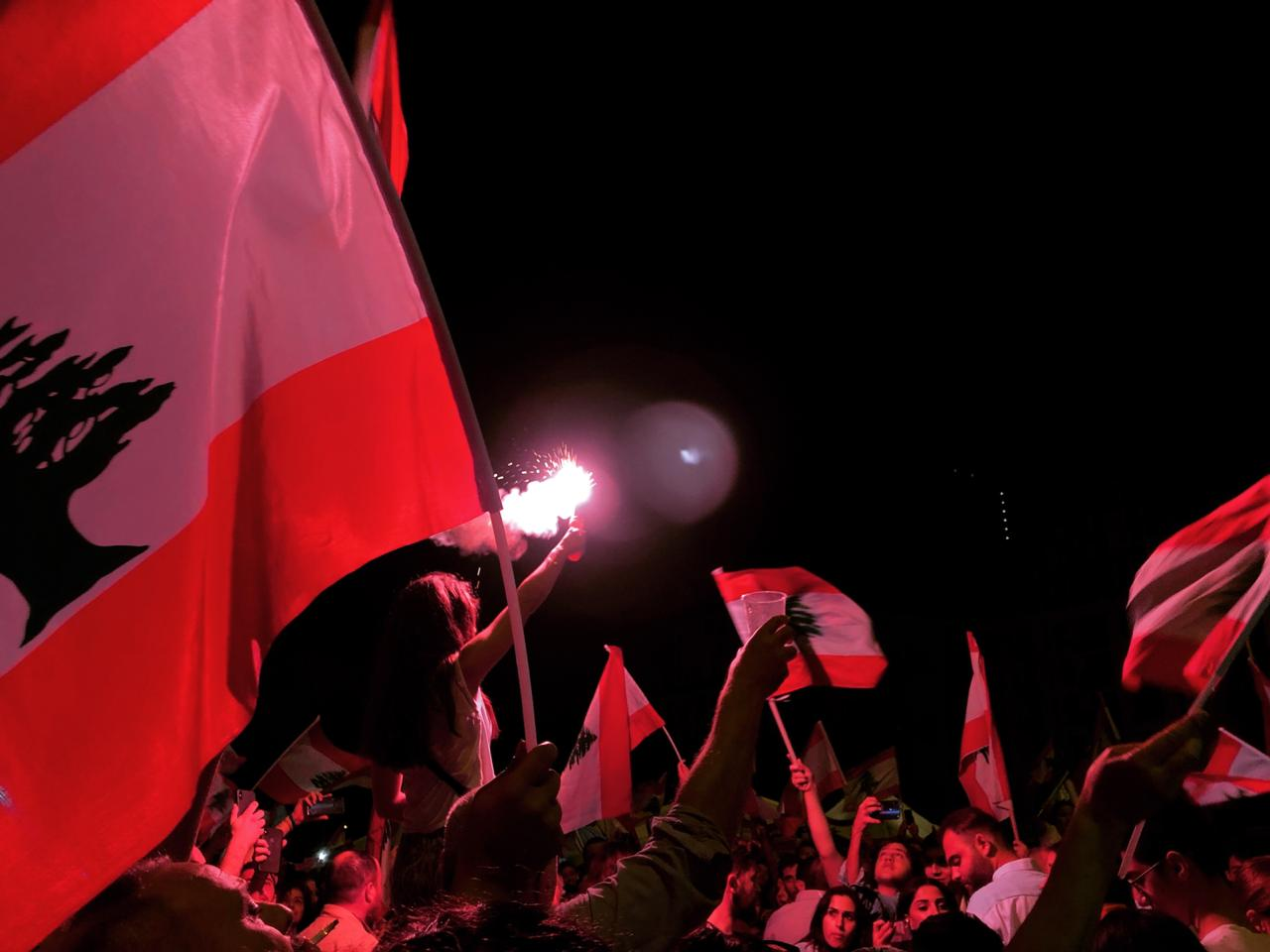
Flare shines light in group of protesters. Beirut, 10 November 2019

On 11 November, the Lebanese Federation of Syndicates of Bank Employees called for a general strike for its 11,000 members over "concerns for safety". This strike is unprecedented in the country's history and its impact is unclear. No end date was specified for the strike, and a general closure of all Lebanese banks may very well be the result. Riad Salameh, the governor of Lebanon's central bank (Banque du Liban) gave a press conference in which he denied the possibility of capital control on the Lebanese economy, assured that a "haircut" on large accounts is not a possibility, and repeated that the central bank's priority remains on economic stability and confidence in the Lebanese pound. When asked about the strike by the bank staff union announced earlier in the day, Salameh claimed to have not yet heard of it. A few minutes after Salameh's press conference, Speaker of Parliament Nabih Berri appeared on live television to announce that the following day's parliamentary session had been delayed until 19 November 2019, possibly as a response to protests called for during the weekend against the proposed general amnesty bill that was due to be discussed. Berri claimed the postponement was for "security reasons". In the afternoon, Hezbollah Secretary-General Hassan Nasrallah gave a speech in which he made strong overtures towards a corruption investigation to be led by Lebanon's judiciary, offering for Hezbollah to collaborate fully with any such investigation and calling for a "strong, independent judiciary" to equally investigate all Lebanese parties without reservation. Nasrallah also called for banking secrecy and any prior amnesty for public representatives to be lifted, "dating back to 1992".

On 12 November, speaker of Parliament Nabih Berri was reported to have sent resigned Prime Minister Saad Hariri a pot of Leben, a traditional Lebanese dairy product, along with a note that promised "eternal enmity" if Hariri refused to form a new government. Hariri thanked Berri for the Leben but excused himself as having ceased eating all kinds of milks and cheeses due to lactose intolerance, concluding that "indeed, the state of the country itself requires a new political diet or "regime", so to speak". The unusual exchange was covered in Lebanese media. President Michel Aoun gave a live interview at 8:30 pm, during which he rejected calls for a fully technocratic government, warned against a run on the bank further damaging the economic sector, and called for an immediate end to the protests to prevent a "catastrophe". Aoun accused protesters of "stabbing the nation with a dagger" and accused protesters that blocked roads of "violating international law". Aoun also stated that "anyone who cannot find faith in the current Lebanese government can leave Lebanon and live somewhere else". Aoun's interview proved exceedingly unpopular with the protest movement, which began blocking an unprecedented number of arterial roads in Beirut and across Lebanon before the interview was even concluded including Qob Elias, "Ring Bridge", Dahr el Baidar, Jiyyeh, Nahr el Kalb, Neemeh, Beddawi, Abdeh, Mahmara, Braqil, Madina Riyadiyya, Verdun, Jal el Dib, Hasbaya, the Palma highway, Aley, Cola, Dawra, Sayyfi, Corniche al Mazraa, and Sassine. Alaa Abou Fakhr, a Lebanese national, was shot and killed in Khalde at the ensuing protests.

Protesters began appearing in the early morning of 13 November near the heavily fortified Baabda Presidential Palace to express dissatisfaction with President Aoun's speech a few hours earlier and picked up in pace as the day progressed.

Activist and protester Khaldoun Jaber was released on 14 November after being detained by the Lebanese army in Baabda the previous day in mysterious circumstances. Jaber was shown to have marks of physical abuse upon his release, which he claimed were due to torture by the army during his detention. Jaber also claimed to have been exposed to psychological abuse. During his detention, Jaber was not given access to a lawyer with even the location of his detention being kept secret. The reason for his arrest was unclear, with some sources claiming it was due to attempting to cross a security perimeter during the previous day's protest near Baabda Palace.

=== Fifth week: 15–21 November ===
As the protests continue nationwide, Sleiman Haroun, the president of the Syndicate of Private Hospitals, threatened to have 15 November 2019 as a day of closure to all patients except the ones who have dialysis, chemotherapy treatment, and emergency care, unless some immediate action is taken by the authorities in the government. Haroun said the strike has nothing to do with the current protest and his purpose was to "raise awareness" and highlight the fact that the government has not been paying its full dues to the hospitals since 2011 and owes them a total of $1.3 billion as of today. Since no direct response was received, all hospitals in Metn, Akkar and Nabatieh areas went on strike that day; doctors along with the hospital's medical teams and staff were on the streets "breathing their last breath".

Currency and payment issues are causing additional burdens on hospitals. Hospitals are running out of medical supplies and equipment because they are 100% reliant on imported supplies and equipment. Due to the shortage of US currency in Lebanon, banks have not been able to transfer funds in US dollars to the companies who import these supplies. Suppliers now have to turn to exchange houses in order to get their US dollars, which end up charging significantly higher rates than the official rate of $1 to £L1,507.5, only if they had any dollars to sell. Suppliers have also not been paid by the hospitals as a result of the situation. If this continues, hospitals will only have one month before they run out of their current shelf stock. Hospitals have received no payment since the beginning of 2019 and salary reductions are being considered in many hospitals if the situation does not improve.

Beirut Bar Association elections were held on 17 November. The independent candidate, Melhem Khalaf, won the majority vote (2,341 votes) to become the BBA's Council president and the first independent candidate to win against politically affiliated candidates in decades. Khalaf's contenders were Nader Gaspard, Saadeddine Al Khatib, and Ibrahim Moussallem. Pierre Hanna, who was backed by the Lebanese Forces, Progressive Socialist Party and the Future Movement, as well as twelve other candidates who either dropped out or were not voted in, competed for council positions.

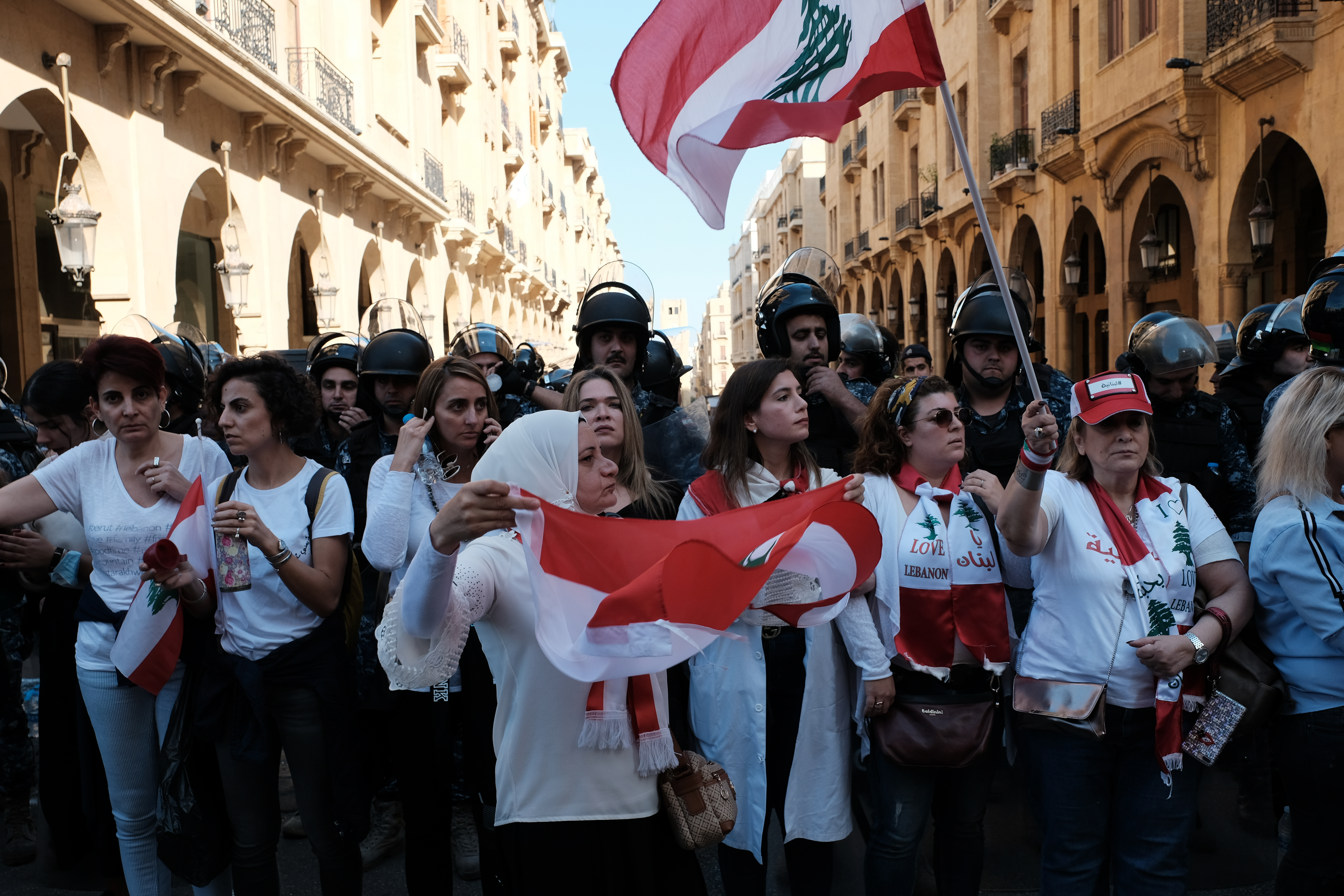
Women protesters forming a line between riot police and protesters in Riad el Solh, Beirut; 19 November 2019

Parliament was set to hold two sessions in the morning of 19 November, including a legislative session that was opposed by protesters, due to it timetabling a controversial amnesty law that was perceived as potentially granting amnesty to crimes committed by the political class, such as misappropriation of public funds or corruption. The sessions were originally planned for 12 November but were already once postponed due to protests. 58 out of 128 Members of Parliament were boycotting the session, but that number was not sufficient to prevent a quorum. A human chain was planned around the Lebanese Parliament to prevent Members of Parliament from entering the premises and to thereby force the session to be postponed. Protesters began gathering early in the morning. Convoys for some Members of Parliament were recorded shooting live bullets or speeding into crowds in an attempt to disperse protesters. Many protesters were gravely injured. At around 11:20am, the Secretary-General of the Lebanese Parliament Adnane Daher confirmed to local media that both parliament sessions were postponed indefinitely. This was perceived as a victory by protesters. Lebanese banks reopened for the first time since 11 November after the Lebanese Federation of Syndicates of Bank Employees ended its strike.

President Michel Aoun gave a speech on 21 November, on the eve of Lebanese Independence Day, in which he called for an end to protests and "hateful language on the streets" and promised an "anti-corruption cabinet". Protesters expressed dissatisfaction with the speech by resuming the closing of roads.

=== Sixth week: 22–28 November ===
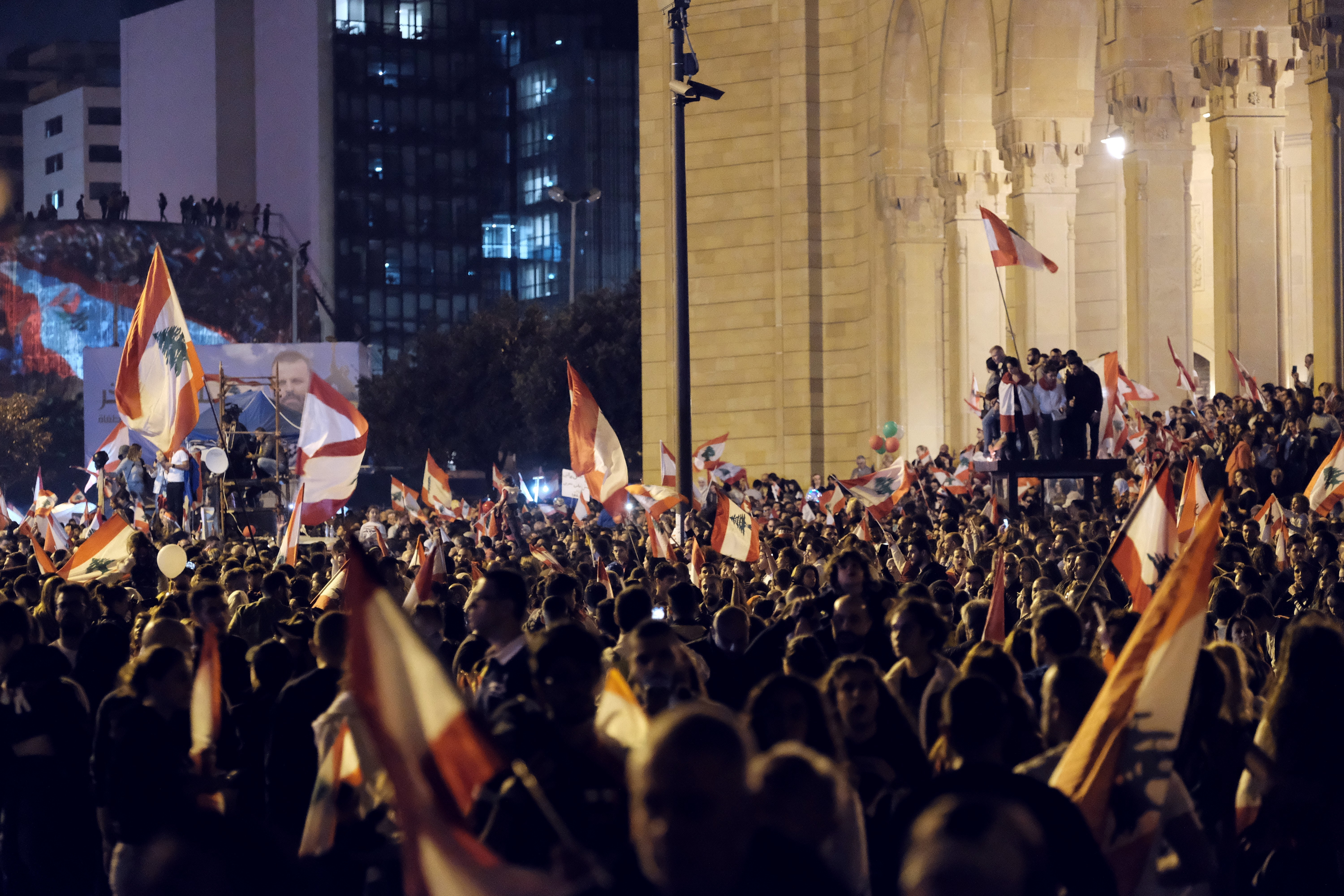
Protests in the evening of Lebanon's 76th Independence Day celebration in Martyr's Square, Beirut.

Lebanon's 76th Independence Day was celebrated on 22 November 2019 with the nation's first-ever civil parade, which was organized by civil society groups in Beirut's Martyr's Square. An invite-only private military parade had been held in the early morning by the Lebanese government, and the civil parade was intended as a rebuke against the government organized by the "true Lebanese": the parade had "battalions" representing different groups from Lebanese society, including cooks, schoolteachers, retired military personnel, pharmacists, engineers, women's rights activists, bankers, athletes, performance artists and more. The civil parade coincided with a program of festival activities organized by independent groups, which included dancing and heat lantern lighting. Marches were held across the Beirut region in the morning, all arriving to the civil parade in central Beirut.

On 23 November, five youths, including children aged 12 and 15, were detained by Lebanese military intelligence after taking down a banner that supported the Free Patriotic Movement, which is the party of President Aoun. Their detention was reported to the media by their families, and the children were released past midnight after the intervention of volunteer lawyers.

A protest was held on 24 November outside the United States embassy in Lebanon to express opposition to U.S. interference in Lebanon. The protest came after Hezbollah accused the United States in meddling with and delaying the formation of a new cabinet, and after comments made by U.S. ambassador Jeffrey Feltman in which he said that "reactions to [Hezbollah] by Lebanese leaders and institutions fortunately coincide with U.S. interests". Around noon, another protest was held across the Lebanese coastline to draw attention to the high level of environmental pollution in Lebanon. Right before midnight, pro-government Hezbollah and Amal Movement supporters violently clashed with protesters in the "Ring" bridge and Jal el Dib areas, demanding an end to road blocks imposed by protesters. This came after protesters apparently physically assaulted two people after suspecting them of being Hezbollah supporters. The Hezbollah/Amal supporters burned civil society tents, trashed cars, and caused damage to public and private property. The Lebanese army intervened with tear gas and flash grenades hours later, dispersing one of the most violent evenings since the beginning of the protests.

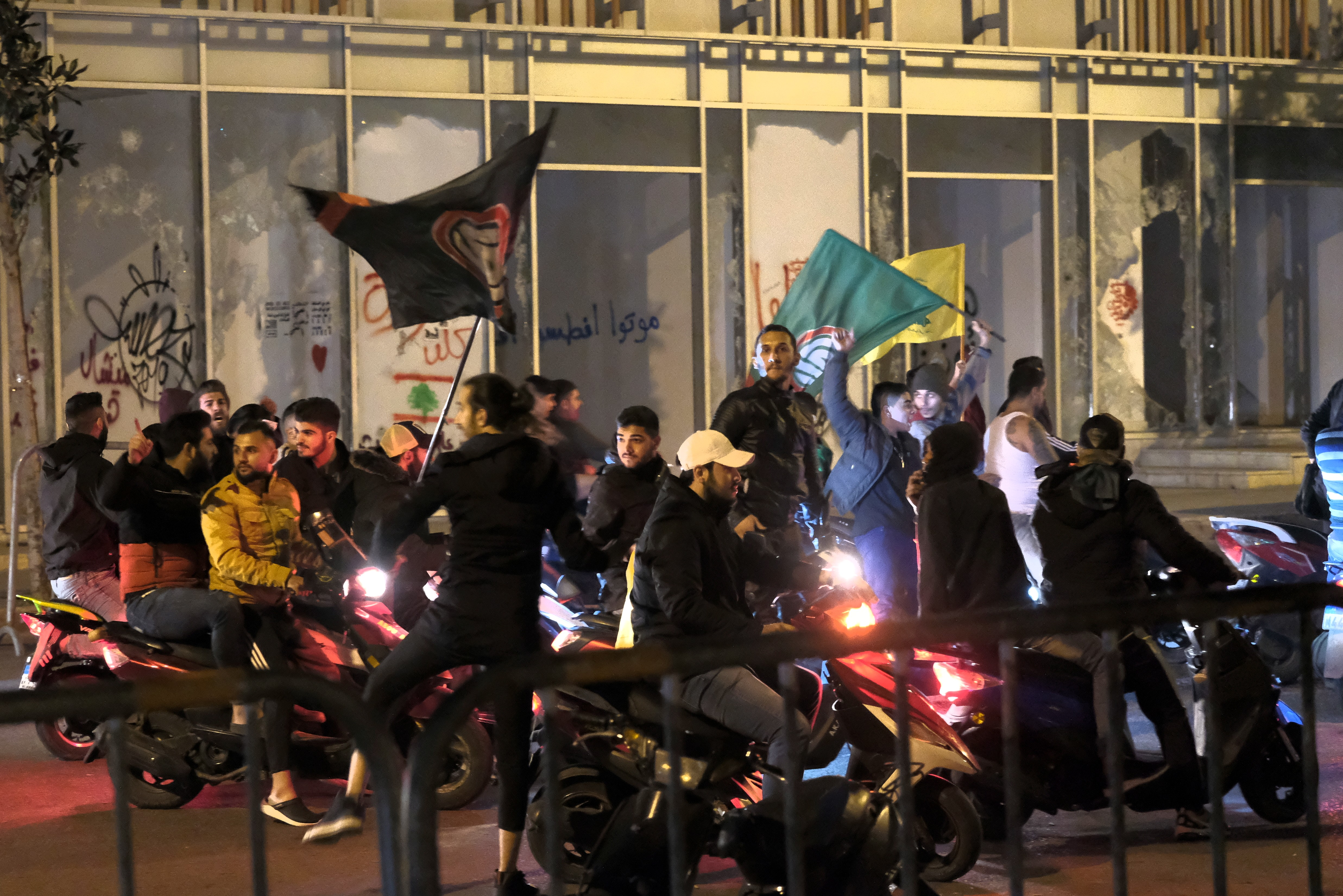
Hezbollah and Amal Movement supporters arrive to Martyr's Square on motorbikes. 25 November 2019.

At around noon on 25 November, Hussein Chalhoub and his sister-in-law Sanaa al-Jundi died after their car hit a makeshift roadblock used by protesters to cut off access to the Jiyyeh highway. This inflamed tensions between protesters and pro-government Hezbollah/Amal Movement supporters. Ján Kubiš, the United Nations Special Coordinator for Lebanon, issued multiple statements on Twitter warning against escalating confrontation between protesters and Hezbollah/Amal Movement supporters. Later in the afternoon, pro-government Hezbollah and Amal Movement supporters began roving around Beirut, Tyre and other cities on mopeds and motorbikes, shouting taunts and provocations at protesters. Some physical clashes ensued, and the confrontations continued to occur sporadically until later in the evening.

Resigned Prime Minister Saad Hariri formally announced on 26 November that he would not run again for the position. Meanwhile, businessman Samir Khatib announced that he was "ready to form a new government", and seemed to accrue some level of endorsement from political parties. President Michel Aoun announced that binding consultations to designate a new Prime Minister would be held on 28 November. Overnight, clashes occurred all around Lebanon. In Baalbek, Hezbollah/Amal Movement supporters destroyed protester's tents and also their sound system. In Bikfaya, Free Patriotic Movement (the party of sitting President Michel Aoun) supporters organized a protest in front of the home of former president Amin Gemayel. They clashed with Kataeb Party (Gemayel's party) supporters, which led to injuries and the destruction of private property until the Lebanese army intervened. Clashes also occurred in Chyah and Ein Rummaneh. The Lebanese Red Cross claimed that dozens of people were injured including one female FPM activist injured to the head, while the Lebanese army said that at least 16 people were detained for their involvement in the clashes.

On 27 November, Lebanon's Syndicate of Gas Station Owners announced that an open-ended strike would begin the next day to highlight the "size of the losses sustained by the sector due to the presence of two-dollar [rates] in the Lebanese market." Hundreds of Lebanese mothers led a "mother's march" in Chyah to protest against sectarian violence on 26 November between youths.

Sources at the Lebanese Ministry of Finance claimed to local media that the Lebanese Central Bank was scheduled to repay US$1.5 billion in Eurobond debt which matures on 28 November, putting to rest speculation that Lebanon could default on its debt. However, Lebanon still has outstanding Eurobond debt due in 2020, and media sources noted that the path towards refinancing necessary to handle that debt is unclear without a cabinet. A protest occurred in front of the Lebanese Central Bank and other government administrative and judiciary institutions. Arab League ambassador Hossam Zaki formally expressed "readiness" to help solve the political and economic crisis in Lebanon for the first time since the beginning of the protests.

=== Seventh week: 29 November – 5 December ===
On 29 November 2019, protests occurred in front of the Lebanese Central Bank and some other judiciary and administrative government buildings and institutions, with the aim of preventing public sector employees from entering these institutions. Multiple media sources claimed that Hezbollah had asked President Michel Aoun to delay binding parliamentary consultations, which were scheduled for 28 November, under the hope that resigned Prime Minister Saad Hariri would revert his decision not to lead the next cabinet.

Protesters gathered on 3 December across the country in response to businessman Samir Khatib's nomination as possible new prime minister. Several cases of suicide were being linked to deteriorating living conditions in Lebanon, most prominently the death of 40-year-old Naji Fleity in Arsal. According to local media, Fleity committed suicide because he was unable to provide for his family after losing his job. His suicide sparked a large outcry of anger online.

Protesters resumed blocking roads on 4 December following politicians' apparent consensus on designating Samir Khatib as the next prime minister.

=== Eighth week: 6–12 December ===
On 7 December 2019, about a thousand people marched in Beirut to protest sexual harassment in Lebanon. A man self-immolated during the protest and survived, with his motives being unclear. The protest came after days of prolonged controversy surrounding a personal trainer in Beirut who was accused by over fifty women of sexual misconduct.

Reports of women journalists being attacked also began to surface around this time. The Coalition For Women In Journalism, which has a special focus on women journalists, documented several attacks. "Covering large protests in many parts of the Middle East has always been so hard for women journalists — we remember the many terrible incidents that happened during the Arab Spring. Following which over the years we have seen many journalism support organizations and others in the industry to train and equip women reporters to be able to take precautions on the ground. But the scope of these attacks are now changing and diversifying." the organization's founding director Kiran Nazish said. "Unfortunately this is an ever more precarious situation and it is important to point out to Lebanese authorities that they have a responsibility to protect the press. Not doing so or doing the opposite is rather reckless," Kiran added.

On 8 December, Samir Khatib withdrew as candidate for prime minister after failing to get enough backing from the Sunni Muslim parties in parliament. With Khatib's withdrawal, Saad Hariri became the only candidate for prime minister once again. Protesters then gathered outside parliament to condemn Hariri's candidacy and demand an independent candidate.

Following days of heavy rainfall, a house collapsed on 10 December in Tripoli, killing two adult siblings. Protesters, claiming that the house collapsed due to consistent municipal negligence, stormed the Tripoli municipal police office and demonstrated outside the house of the mayor. They smashed windows, set a room on fire, and damaged a car. The army intervened to stop the violence. In Jounieh, four protesters were detained after attempting to block roads. They were released the same evening after another protest blocked the Jounieh highway. In Beirut, protesters organized demonstrations outside the houses of current and former public works ministers. While attempting to reach the home of former public works and transportation minister Ghazi Zaiter, they were blocked at Rue Verdun by men dressed in uniforms of the Internal Security Forces. Cars were vandalized as the men dragged protesters out to beat them; a dozen people including reporter Paula Naufal were hospitalized for their injuries.

Protesters in Tripoli resumed blocking roads on 11 December.

=== Ninth week: 13–19 December ===
Riot police used tear gas against groups of men that attacked protesters' camps in Beirut on 14 December. In the evening, protesters in central Beirut attempted to reach Nejmeh Square, chanting slogans against Saad Hariri, who was expected to be named prime minister by 20 December, and Gebran Bassil. The protesters were met with violence, tear gas and rubber bullets by the Lebanese internal security forces. At least 46 people were hospitalized with injuries according to the Lebanese Red Cross and Lebanese Civil Defense.

Saad Hariri
(@saadhariri)
tweeted:

Arabic:

ولما تبين لي انه رغم التزامي القاطع بتشكيل حكومة اختصاصيين، فإن المواقف التي ظهرت في الأيام القليلة الماضية من مسألة تسميتي هي مواقف غير قابلة للتبديل، فإنني أعلن انني لن أكون مرشحا لتشكيل الحكومة المقبلة، ٢/٣

Translation:

And as it became clear to me that despite my categorical commitment to forming a government of specialists, the reactions of the past few days regarding my nomination were uncompromising, I announce that I will not be a candidate to form the next government, 2/3

18 December 2019

In Beirut, protesters clashed with security forces on 15 December for the second night in a row near Nejmeh Square. According to the Lebanese Civil Defense, 46 people were treated for injuries and another 14 were hospitalized. A group of counter-protesters, themselves supporters of Amal and Hezbollah, also briefly clashed with protesters until the army intervened.

Roads were blocked in northern Lebanon on 16 December. At noon, President Aoun delayed scheduled parliamentary consultations, where Saad Hariri was widely expected to be renamed prime minister. This was because Hariri was now no longer being supported by the main Christian parties in parliament. At night, protesters gathered close to Saad Hariri's Beirut residence to reject his reappointment. A separate group of protesters descended upon Beirut as well, expressing outrage at a month-old video of an ex-pat insulting several Shi'a religious leaders. Amal and Hezbollah released statements asking the men to fall back, but these calls were not immediately heeded. Protest encampments in several places, including Beirut, Saida and Nabatieh, were ransacked and destroyed during the night. At least two cars in Beirut were set on fire.

On 18 December, Hariri announced that he did not want to be reappointed prime minister, calling on the president to designate a new Prime Minister immediately. Later that day, Al Jadeed claimed that the remaining candidates for Prime Minister were now Tammam Salam (the 34th Prime Minister, 2014–2016), jurist Nawaf Salam (former representative of Lebanon to the United Nations), Khaled Mohieddin Qabbani (former Minister of Justice, 2005–2008) and academic Hassan Diab (former Minister of Education, 2011–2014). Diab was the apparent favorite, because he had the support of Hezbollah and Amal. Protests continued in Nabatieh and Kfar Remen despite threats of retaliation by Hezbollah and Amal supporters. Cement walls and blocs were erected around Beirut's central district, blocking off streets leading to and from Riad Al Solh Square as well a parliament.

Parliamentary consultations took place on 19 December and Hassan Diab was designated as the next prime minister to succeed Hariri. The announcement of Diab becoming prime minister was immediately followed by street protests and road blocks in Tripoli and Beirut. Near Beirut's Nejme Square, hundreds of protesters sang an anti-Diab chant.

=== Tenth week: 20–26 December ===
Road blocks in response to Diab's Prime Ministership continued across the country on 20 December. Schools were closed in Tripoli.

On 22 December, thousands protested against Diab's nomination on Beirut's Martyrs' Square, many of them coming from the north of the Beqaa Valley. Protests in Beirut continued on 23 December with a lower turnout. Later that day, hundreds of people shared a Christmas dinner benefiting the poor on Martyrs' Square.

On 24 December, it was reported that tourism fell by 80% because of the protest movements. Additionally, 265 restaurants and cafes closed their doors in the last two months.

=== Eleventh week: 27–31 December ===
A group of pro-Hariri Sunni Muslims protested on 28 December 2019 in front of the new Prime Minister Diab calling for him to resign. On 29 December, protests continued asking for Hassan Diab's resignation although he is still continuing consultations to form the government.

=== Killing of Alaa Abou Fakhr ===
On the evening of 12 November 2019, Alaa Abou Fakhr, a Lebanese national, was shot and killed in Khalde at the ensuing protests. Abou Fakhr's death appeared to have been unprovoked, as he was unarmed and attending the protest with his wife and child. The Lebanese Army released a statement saying that his death occurred as an accident after a soldier fired shots purely with the intent to clear a path for an army convoy and that the soldier had been referred to military court for a trial. However, during Abou Fakhr's funeral ceremony the next day, his wife, who was present with Abou Fakhr during his shooting, claimed that he was killed by Lebanese military intelligence. Abou Fakhr's death was the first to be caused by the Lebanese army. A video circulating on social media appeared to show a plainclothes man who drove a civilian automobile shooting Abou Fakhr at close range.

Abou Fakhr was a member of the Municipal Committee of Choueifat as a representative of the Lebanese Progressive Socialist Party. Walid Jumblatt, the party's leader, appeared among protesters to call for calm after mounting animosity towards the Lebanese army, urging that "the state is our only refuge or else we will descend into chaos". Abou Fakhr's death triggered a substantial increase in protest activity, with reported clashes with army forces and additional roads being barricaded in protest. Tributes and candlelight vigils were held for Abou Fakhr across Lebanon and were attended by thousands of protesters, who came to perceive him as symbolizing a martyr for the revolutionary movement. Abou Fakhr's family received condolences from virtually every Lebanese political faction.

On 13 November 2019, the Lebanese Army announced that the suspected killer, First Adjutant Charbel Hjeil, had been referred to the military judiciary to await trial after the conclusion of the army's interrogation process. A massive funeral procession was held in the evening with tens of thousands of attendees, with Abou Fakhr's coffin carried throughout Beirut.

On 21 November 2019, the Lebanese Army announced that First Adjutant Charbel Hjeil was charged with the murder of Alaa Abou Fakhr. The Colonel on the scene, Nidal Daou, also received unspecified charges. Sources claimed that Daou and Abou Fakhr were acquainted prior to the murder, implying a personal motive. The investigation was then slated to continue on 25 November 2019.

== 2020 protests ==
=== Protests resume ===
After weeks of relative calm, mass protests resumed across the country on 14 January 2020. Highways and major roads were blocked in Beirut, Tripoli, Akkar, Sidon, and Zahle by protests and burning tires. In Beirut, protesters clashed with security forces outside the Central Bank. Protests also took place outside Hassan Diab's house for failing to form a government. President Michel Aoun blamed obstacles in the delay of formation of a new government. School and university students participated in some of the demonstrations.

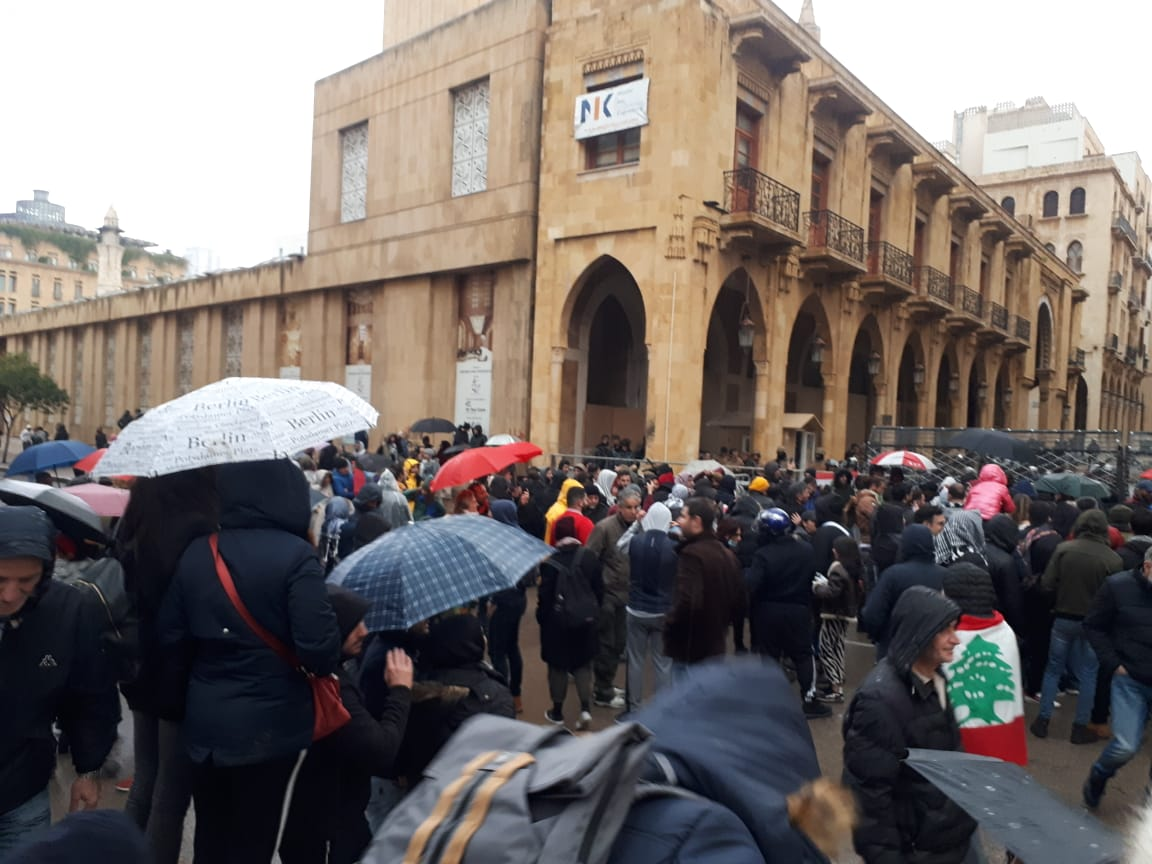
Protests outside of the Parliament of Lebanon. Beirut, 16 January 2020

On 15 January, protesters gathered in front of the Helou police barracks in Beirut demanding the release of more than 50 protesters who were arrested the night before. During the protest, riot police fired tear gas and practiced excessive violence to separate protesters. Additionally, an estimated number of 15 protesters were dragged into the barracks. The Lebanese Media reported that there have been more than 30 injuries as a result of the clashes that happened between the protesters and the riot police. The Lebanese Army also arrived at the scene later on that night. It was reported by the Red Cross that the wounded people on Wednesday had reached 45, according to DW. According to Reuters, Lebanon's Minister of Interior has issued a statement criticizing the violence and urging the protesters to remain peaceful.

As the Lebanese protests enter its fourth month on 17 January, protesters blocked several main roads across Lebanon, including a vital road connecting central Beirut's east and west. Hundreds of protesters were said to have also gathered outside the Lebanese central bank and close to the parliament, the Times of Israel added. On Friday morning, the roads were also blocked in second city Tripoli by protesters, but later in the day the roads were cleared, according to France 24. Human Rights Watch has urged authorities to free detainees that haven't been charged with a recognizable crime and that the Ministry of Interior should quickly hold security officers responsible for the excessive use of force on protesters. HRW also claimed that protesters and media officials had been struck by riot police, according to Al Jazeera.

=== Escalation of violence and arrest of journalists ===
In an attempt to break up gatherings of anti-government protesters attempting to reach Martyr's Square on 18 January, dozens of people have been injured as security forces used water cannons and tear gas to dissipate the protesters. Furthermore, demonstrators have been spotted at Martyr's Square throwing rocks, fireworks and Molotov cocktails at security forces, as well as shining lasers at them to interrupt series of tear gas rounds, CNN reported. In the evening, President Aoun summoned in the armed forces to the streets in order to safeguard private property, as well as peaceful protesters, ABC News reported. About 30 people were said to have been detained due to Saturday's unrest, the state-run National News Agency stated, though the detainees were later released. More than 60 wounded people are believed to have received treatment, while at least 40 people have been rushed to the hospitals, the Lebanese Red Cross stated. In total, Reuters reported that more than 370 people had been injured in the day's protests.

On 19 January, an American freelance journalist, Nicholas Frakes, was arrested on the allegation of sending footage of anti-government protests to the Israeli newspaper Haaretz, according to The Washington Post. However, Haaretz Newspaper has rejected any connection to Nicholas Frakes, arguing that the live video feed of the anti-government protest uploaded on their Facebook account was from Reuters, the Jerusalem Post added. The committee to Protect Journalists (CPJ) claimed that since 14 January, journalists reporting anti-government protests in Beirut have been arrested, attacked or molested by police officers, according to the International Business Times. According to France 24, In light of this week's World Economic Forum, the expected participation of Lebanon's outgoing foreign minister Gebran Bassil triggered a strong public protest, demanding the cancellation of his invitation. However, Bassil maintains that the protesters who chanted against him do not make up the majority of Lebanese and that he believes the people of Lebanon want change, but he argued that he isnot leaving until voters drive him out in elections, according to The Washington Post. The former foreign minister further claimed that he came to Davos "on his own expenses". As of 21 January, there has been an increase in the number of injured people in the Lebanese protests to more 540, according to The Times of Israel.

=== New government formed ===
On 21 January, Prime Minister Diab announced the formation of a new cabinet of 20 ministers, despite public outrage and protests against the Cabinet of Hassan Diab. According to CNN, during an interview with Lebanon's state news agency, Diab portrayed the newly appointed ministers as "technocrats" who he believes would operate without loyalties to political parties. However, the cabinet members themselves were unable to hide their partisan allegiances. Even before the new cabinet was unveiled, several groups of protesters had gathered in the streets of Beirut, obstructing a main street in the center of the capital, according to France 24. The Times of Israel added that the protesters made an effort to take down barbed wire near the parliament building and throw rocks at security forces, who in return used tear gas and water cannons. Some protesters maintained that they would remain in the streets, till their claims for a technocratic government and early elections were met, according to Al Jazeera.

According to VOA, despite the fact that the newly formed ministers are experts and academics, protesters are still accusing political groups of participating in forming the new cabinet. On 22 January, as Lebanon's new government convened, protesters in the capital gathered to discredit the meeting, smashing windows and breaking down security blockages encircling the parliament building.

Amnesty International, based on evidence collected, has accused the Internal Security Forces of using rubber bullets unlawfully at close range, besides beatings, water cannons and tear gas in an attempt to disperse protesters on the weekend, which has left hundreds wounded. 25 January marked the 100th day since the protests began. Protesters gathered in Beirut and breached several security barriers around the central government building.

On 27 January, the Lebanon Parliament passed a 2020 budget, amid the debilitating financial crisis. The state budget came as the protests outside the Parliament in Beirut were held back by the security forces. Four people had been injured and taken to the hospitals in Beirut, with 8 other people sustaining minor injuries, the Lebanese Red Cross announced. The state-run National News Agency stated that only 70 out of the 128 members of parliament attended Monday's vote, with 49 lawmakers in favor of passing the budget, 13 against and 8 abstaining. According to Al Jazeera, analysts argue that the endorsed 2020 budget barely attempts to resolve Lebanon's financial and economic crisis.

According to SBS News, the parliament budget committee chairman Ibrahim Kanaan stated that the purpose of the new budget is to lower the deficit of gross domestic product to around 7%. Experts warned that the direction in which Lebanon is heading could ignite more instability, as the newly formed government is not expected to convince Lebanese protesters to end their demonstrations against the ruling elite, according to VOA.

=== February protests ===
On 2 February, a protest was held outside the United States embassy in Beirut, by hundreds of Lebanese and Palestinians, in opposition to the US plan for ending the Israeli–Palestinian conflict. Protesters were gathered on a road leading to the US embassy, northeast of Beirut, waving Palestinian flags, with some of the protesters chanting "Death to America! Death to Israel! We will die and Palestine survive," according to France 24. It was reported by the VOA News that around noon, security forces used what seemed to be pepper spray to stop some of the protesters who had removed the barbed wire and reached a metal fence set up by security forces. At least three protesters were said to have been carried away in the process of the struggle. According to Arab News, 24 hours prior to the protest, employees of the US embassy were advised to stay clear of the area of the protests.

However, in an attempt to prove to the government that the Lebanese people are united in their quest for political change, protesters were also reported to have gathered in Tripoli, the country's poorest city on Sunday, according to Al Jazeera.

According to the Middle East Monitor, in a statement issued by the Lebanese Information Minister Abdul Samad on 6 February, he disclosed that the new government of Lebanon has agreed to the approval of a new policy statement, which is believed to include a clause calling for the return of refugees back to their various countries.

On 10 February, women's groups at the local level in Lebanon, including other alienated groups, are demanding for their rights to be honored by the Lebanese government, Al Jazeera reported.

On Tuesday, the Lebanese parliament held a nine-hour session, in which the legislators passed a vote of confidence, supporting the newly formed cabinet by the Lebanese government, and its financial rescue plan. Protesters attempted to disrupt the meeting from holding by throwing stones at security forces and tried to block the path leading to the parliament. The parliament meeting was attended by 84 members of parliament, with 63 of them voting in support of the government, France 24 added. In an attempt by protesters to evade security checkpoints, they started to form up at various points in Beirut, but some lawmakers reportedly spent the night in the parliament ahead of the meeting, in order to avoid being prevented by protesters.

On 14 February, former Prime Minister Saad Hariri delivered his first speech after leaving office in October, urging that he is not leaving Lebanon, but mapping out a new future in politics with his party. In response to Lebanon's request for technical assistance from the IMF earlier in February, hundreds of protesters have gathered around Lebanon's central bank and parliament on 15 February, in rejection of the request.

The World Bank has warned Lebanon against the risk of implosion if they fail to adopt a new system of governance that is more genuine and transparent compared to the old one. Lebanon's Prime Minister Hassan Diab hosted the speaker of the Iranian Parliament Ali Larijani on 17 February, as Iran expresses readiness to assist Lebanon with its ongoing crisis. The Iranian speaker added that, considering Lebanon has made it all the way past the creation of a new government, Iran is now ready to assume their responsibility, which involves working with Lebanon, according to the Tasnim News Agency. According to The New York Times, several Lebanese are considering emigration as a solution to the ongoing deepening crisis in Lebanon which has no end date, with some in possession of a second passport already, which will pave way for them to leave the country without any difficulty.

During the G-20 Summit in Riyadh on 23 February, Saudi Arabia's finance minister divulged Saudi's plan of assisting Lebanon with its financial crisis, once there is assurance that Lebanon has put in place a solid reform plan. Also during the summit, the finance minister of France has expressed his country's willingness to provide Lebanon with any form of financial support if need be. Furthermore, the Lebanese government is trying to set up an emergency economic plan that will improve the country's conditions, amid fears of acquiring aid from the international community. Several migrant workers in Lebanon are paying the price for the country's financial crisis, as the access to hard currency has been limited, France 24 reported.

=== March protests ===
Lebanon recorded its first case of COVID-19 on 21 February. On 28 February, the Lebanese Government implemented the first of many measures aimed at combating the virus, closing all educational institutions starting 29 February.

Due to religious restrictions guarding the country's system of protection, Lebanon's Prime Minister Hassan Diab stated on 2 March, that the government has become unable to protect the Lebanese citizens. Lebanon's huge debts have cast doubts on the ability of Lebanon to meet repayment due by 9 March, as several members of parliament reject paying the $1.2bn Euro-bond, regardless of the consequences, the speaker of parliament disclosed on 4 March.

On 5 March, Lebanese came out in hundreds near banks in Southern Lebanon, to protest against the regulations stopping them from withdrawing their funds. However, the Lebanese parliament is believed to have passed a bill to ensure that banking secrecy has been lifted, Justice Minister Marie-Claude Najm stated. Lebanon's minister of information also added that the law is expected to be applicable to members of parliament, ministers, as well as public officials. As the exchange rate of US dollar-Lebanese pound reached £L2,600 on Thursday, hundreds of demonstrators took to the streets in Antelias and Beirut, demanding for the government to find a solution, as well as to hold early elections. Considering the current economic situation in Lebanon, a judge has reportedly halted an order of assets freezing of 20 banks, including their directors. The judge explained the reason for suspending the order, stating that he wants to first learn how the order could affect Lebanon's current economic position.

On 7 March, Prime Minister Hassan Diab said that Lebanon would default on a Eurobond repayment and pursue restructuring its debt. The country has never before defaulted. Lebanon's government debt is about 170% of its yearly gross domestic product. Several Analysts have added that only the IMF's support could be the solution to Lebanon's financial crisis after the default. However, hundreds of protesters have reportedly continued their rally which commenced earlier on Thursday, in several cities across the country including Sidon, as they criticise against the financial policies and poor standard of living in the country.

On 9 March, Prime Minister Hassan Diab announced that Lebanon had defaulted on a $1.2 billion Eurobond, for the very first time in the history of the country.

On 10 March, the restriction on deposits due to shortage of foreign currency was reduced by a public prosecutor, as he consented to rules for commercial banks, targeted at defending depositor's rights. The decision was verified by an official at the office of the public prosecutor, even though no additional comment was given.

Amid fears of the further spread of coronavirus in Lebanon, on 15 March, the government decided to put in place a state of emergency, leaving its crippling economy in a stalemate. The decision was reached after several hours of an emergency cabinet meeting which resulted to the closure of its land borders, seaports and Rafic Hariri International Airport in Beirut. According to Reuters, the closure which commenced on Wednesday, is expected to be in place until 29 March, so as to enable the state of health emergency that has been set up, to tackle the virus effectively.

On 23 March, the Lebanese government decided to stop paying back all debts in foreign currencies, in light of the fall in foreign currency reserves and worsening financial and economic crisis. The COVID-19 pandemic has caused many businesses to be closed down, including a severe impact on the foreign sector, which influenced the government's new decision. The Lebanese finance ministry added that the country is planning on reaching reasonable understanding with its creditors immediately.

On 27 March, camps in Martyrs Square in central Beirut, which has been mostly occupied by protesters since October 2019, were reportedly cleared by Lebanon's security forces, according to the National Post. The security forces engaged the Martyrs Square in the evening after the Lebanese cabinet had imposed a curfew. The decision to remove the camps was made amid growing concerns over the further spread of coronavirus, according to the Lebanese government. However, protesters claimed that the police neither informed or gave them a notice, instead, they instructed them to quickly vacate the protest site. A protester added that there were only about 50 to 60 of them remaining when the security forces invaded the camps, as most of the protesters had evacuated the camps following the closure of seaports and airport of Beirut by the Lebanese government on 18 March, according to the Al-Monitor. Activists and journalists in Lebanon have expressed their concerns on the suspicion that the Lebanese government might be using the COVID-19 pandemic as an excuse to make its powers even stronger.

=== April protests ===
On 2 April, some activists and journalists defied the lockdown that was issued by the cabinet on 15 March to prevent the widespread of COVID-19, protesting against the closure of banks which led to the arrest of six activists and a journalist by the Lebanese security forces. The small group of protesters gathered in front of the Al-Mawarid Bank's Hamra branch in west Beirut, with some people putting on surgical masks and others without, Al-Arabiya added.

President Michel Aoun on 6 April, urged the international community to provide Lebanon with financial support as they battle to survive the ongoing economic crisis, alongside the COVID-19 pandemic. The president made the call during a meeting of the International support group for Lebanon, in which he particularly asked the governments of the International community to make available $11 billion which they had pledged for during a conference in Paris, April 2018. Aoun also maintained that the country is solely relying on the financial aid which is to be dedicated in executing infrastructure projects, as they have gone into an unforeseen economic recession.

On 7 April, just a day after security forces stopped an escape attempt in Tripoli's prison in northern Lebanon, heavy protests erupted amid fears of the spread of coronavirus. At least four inmates were reportedly injured when security forces fired rubber bullets in an attempt to disperse the crowd.

According to CNN, American citizens living in Lebanon have rejected the offer made by the US government to return them back to the US, due to the drastic increase in the number of COVID-19 cases in America. The offer was given to both citizens and permanent residents on a chartered flight at the cost of $2,500 for each individual.

On 21 April, several protesters in Lebanon returned to the streets again in large car convoys, gathering around the complex where MPs convened in order to pass several laws on Tuesday. Many protesters were sighted waving Lebanon's flag while putting on protective gear like medical masks and hand gloves as a preventive measure against the Coronavirus. Due to the worsening economic condition, COVID-19 lock-down and the Lebanese government's inability to enact policies that would curb the situation, protesters were threatening to resume protests nationwide, Xinhuanet reported. Prime minister Hassan Diab disclosed after the session that the reforms plan by the government is scheduled to be discussed next week.

On 27 April, large clashes in Tripoli between the army and protesters resulted in one protester being killed. 40 troops were injured, and many banks in Tripoli were set on fire or had their windows smashed due to the currency's rapid devaluation. Molotov cocktails had been thrown at an army vehicle and at least 5 banks in the city in the previous days, and heavy gunfire was heard. The next day, all banks in Tripoli announced their temporary closure until security has been restored, as they have been the targets attacks and rioting. Protests also took place in Sidon on 27 April.

On 28 April, large protests erupted in Tripoli for a 2nd consecutive night, along with other demonstrations in Beirut, Sidon, Nabatieh, Bekaa Valley, and Akkar, in defiance of the lockdown to contain COVID-19 in Lebanon. Over a dozen banks and cash machines across the country were either torched with Molotov cocktails or vandalized. The military expressed regret over the killing of a protester the night before and opened an investigation into the death. A funeral procession for the deceased protester in Tripoli took place.

On 29 April, small protests continued for the third night. In the northern city of Tripoli, protesters lobbed fireworks and stones at soldiers who pushed them back with rubber bullets. In the southern city of Sidon, demonstrators set a central bank building ablaze with petrol bombs for a second night.

After a series of protests that turned into violence, the government of Lebanon on 30 April, approved the long-awaited plan to save the country's economy from the brink of collapse. Prime Minister Hassan Diab maintained that the Lebanese government intends to use the plan in applying for an IMF programme that would facilitate the revival of the economy which is projected to be in crisis for the next five years. Following minor amendments, the approval of the plan was unanimously agreed by the government during the cabinet meeting at the presidential palace in Baabda, according to SBS. However, Diab assured that the plan is subject to the option of having minor changes to it.

=== May protests ===
Protesters in Lebanon on 1 May, rejected the government's rescue plan which was announced on Thursday, as hundreds of protesters gathered outside the Central bank in Beirut and across the country. The protesters condemned the government's approach towards tackling the economic crisis which plummeted their local currency, leading to inflation and increased prices of goods. Outside a private bank, struggles reportedly erupted between security forces and protesters, as at least one protester was sighted being stroked and taken away by security forces, according to Daily Sabah.

Lebanese banks have also shown their lack of support for the government to seek help from the IMF, claiming their counsel wasn't asked for. The banking association of Lebanon urged for the rejection of the plan by members of parliament, maintaining that it does not need to be passed, as it infringes on private property rights. They added that the plan has no specific time for implementation, also lacking the ability to proffer solutions to the high rate of inflation, possibly leading to hyperinflation. However, it is believed that the IMF may possibly confer with the Lebanese banks on the rescue plan before proceeding further, according to Arab News.

The United Nations on 8 May 2020, reported that the journalists covering popular demonstrations in Lebanon are at the highest risk of contracting COVID-19, as many of those protesting do not abide by the safety measures advised for preventing the spread of the novel virus. The issue was first addressed by Joyce Akiki, a prominent Lebanon-based reporter for MTV channel in her velfie (or a video selfie).

On 14 May, the director of cash operations for the Lebanese central bank, Mazen Hamdan was arrested based on the suspicion of being involved in currency manipulation. The order for the director's arrest was issued by A Lebanese financial prosecutor, Ali Ibrahim. Although the prosecutor's office is yet to release a statement, security sources have confirmed that Hamdan is being held in detention while awaiting an investigation, according to Reuters. Following the arrest of Mazen Hamdan, Lebanon's Prime Minister Hassan Diab demanded for the allegations regarding the Lebanese pound to be looked into further, maintaining that the people of Lebanon are entitled to an explanation as to why the exchange rate has plummeted, Daily Sabah added.

=== June protests ===
On 2 June, protesters in Lebanon took to social media to share preventive measures with protesters who gathered in several cities across the United States, over the murder of George Floyd, an unarmed black man in Minneapolis, Minnesota, by a white police officer. The Lebanese protesters further provided the US protesters with a list of items to carry along while demonstrating, as well as how to prevent themselves from the excessive use of force by security forces. The hashtag #Americarevolts in Arabic language which trended on Twitter was used by several protesters in Lebanon as a sign of solidarity.

On 4 June, In anticipation of the intended protest scheduled for Saturday by the civil movement, the period of general mobilization in Lebanon was extended to 5 July by the Lebanese Council of Ministers. The Lebanese aren't denied their right to protest, so far as they wear protective gear, avoid shutting down roads, starting violence with security forces, or destroying properties, the minister of Information Abdel-Samad stated. He added that the decision regarding the extension was reached in line with the recommendation of the Higher Defense Council. Prime minister Hassan Diab, despite his support for peaceful protests, expressed his fears and cautioned the people of Lebanon against taking advantage of the situation by turning it into violence.

On 6 June, several protesters returned to the streets for the first time since the COVID-19 lockdown was put in place. The protests reportedly turned violent when some anti-government protesters and supporters of the Iran-backed Shiite Hezbollah movement began to throw stones at each other, according to DW. As the thousands of protesters gathered in Beirut's Martyrs' Square clashed, the army was forced to intervene and stand in between the two groups. According to a statement by the Lebanese Red Cross on Twitter, 37 people were injured during the violence that erupted, with the majority of the victims treated at the scene.

On 11 June, fresh violence erupted in Lebanon's capital Beirut, after the Lebanese pound significantly depreciated against the US dollars as angry protesters took to the streets. Several roads were shut down across Lebanon by anti-government protesters, consequently clashing with security forces who used tear gas to disperse the crowd. According to CNN, protests also reportedly broke out in southern cities of Saida and Nabatieh, as well as the northern city of Tripoli, where demonstrators threw Molotov cocktails and stones at the city's central bank building. Following the series of heavy clashes that rocked Lebanon on Thursday, Prime Minister Hassan Diab called for an emergency cabinet meeting on Friday, in an attempt to discuss solutions to the country's financial crisis. BBC reported that President Michel Aoun disclosed that the central bank is expected to start injecting US dollars into the market, so as to stabilize the plummeted exchange rate.

On 12 June, the demonstration which started late Thursday evening, entered its second night, with security forces firing rubber bullets and tear gas after clashing with protesters in Beirut and northern Lebanon's Tripoli. Many public properties, shops, were destroyed by the protesters.

On 13 June, some Lebanese protesters in Beirut's Martyrs' Square were sighted wearing black with their faces colored in white, while moving around with a coffin covered with the Lebanese. As the protests in the capital and other cities across Lebanon reached its third consecutive day, hundreds of demonstrators rallied through the streets of Lebanon demanding for the Diab's government to quit. After 100 days in power, the government led by prime minister Hassan Diab was considered inadequate to alleviate the economic crisis.

On 18 June, Henri Chaoul, a top advisor for Lebanon's Minister of Finance in the International Monetary Fund negotiations resigned. Chaoul's publicly posted resignation directly placed blame on the government and ruling elite stating "Whilst the IMF has confirmed the quantum of these losses, the establishment (the political class, the monetary authorities, and the financial sector as a whole) has opted to dismiss the magnitude of these losses that impose themselves as an incontestable reality and has embarked on a populist agenda". During the day, protesters blocked the main highway in Jounieh connecting the city to Beirut. Clashes and violence between protesters and security forces occurred over the arrest of activist Michel Chamoun after he had criticized president Michel Aoun on social media. This comes a few days after a new order allowed the right to sue people who insulted the presidency on social media. Violence erupted as Chamoun was being transported from the serail in Jounieh to another detention center. One Internal Security Forces officer was injured in the clashes.

On 22 June, a female activist, Kinda El-Khatib, was charged with the crime of "dealing with the enemy [Israel]" and visiting occupied Palestinian territories, after she was taken from her home in Akkar on 18 June.

On 25 June, protests erupted across Lebanon amidst deteriorating economic conditions in the country, with several protesters shutting down various roads in Lebanon. Several demonstrators reportedly gathered at the Palace of Justice in Beirut, calling for the immediate release of protesters who were detained earlier this week on the allegations of destruction of properties. According to Al Jazeera, the Lebanese pound on Thursday plummeted to a new rate of more than £L7,000 to the dollar on the black market. Following the protests that erupted, President Michel Aoun on Thursday held a national meeting with Lebanon's top politicians, in fear of further escalation of the protests into a civil war.

During a television interview with Al Manar on 28 June, Lebanon's Interior Minister, Mohamed Fahmi, acknowledged killing two people during the 15-year civil war in Lebanon. Fahmi claimed that he was protected by the current President Michel Aoun who was then a senior officer in the army. He also revealed that an incident occurred with the two people he killed, who were part of a very powerful group. The interview with the minister has raised doubts regarding the relationship between Prime Minister Hassan Diab's assumed technocratic government and the current political elite comprising the likes of President Aoun.

On 29 June, two weeks after Henri Chaoul's resignation, the Finance Ministry Director-General and negotiator with the IMF, Alain Bifani, submitted his resignation. At a press conference, Bifani cited the reasons for resigning were that negotiations were at a "dead end" and that the risk level has reached a point where he could no longer stay silent. Bifani continued, "We waited a long time for a chance to achieve serious change and we tried to anticipate what we have reached today. We struggled to avoid the worst, but the forces of darkness and tyranny came together to impede what we did". In a phone call interview with France 24, Bifani blamed the elite interest groups for allowing negotiations to reach a dead-end stating "This is one of the very few cases when the IMF is seen on the side of social justice against political elites in cahoots with private interests, banks, and big depositors – the few who have over $10 million each [in bank deposits] and don't want to contribute to a fair solution." An investigation was launched by Lebanon's security forces into a claimed missile attack that was supposedly fired close to former Prime Minister Saad al-Hariri's convoy on 17 June. A missile reportedly went off 500 metres away from the ex-prime minister's convoy while he was visiting the eastern Bekaa Valley. To note, the report was first published by a foreign news station, the Saudi-owned TV station Al-Hadath, and there is no other reference of the attack.

=== July protests ===
On 3 July, with the continuing collapse of the Lebanese economy and hardship, two men were believed to have killed themselves in Lebanon, according to the Daily Star. A note, a Lebanese flag and a copy of spotless criminal record were discovered on the busy street in Beirut where the first victim, a 61-year-old man from the eastern region of Hermel shot himself. As security workers were taking away the body in a white coffin and clearing the scene, his relative blamed the government for the hard times that brought about the suicide of the victim. However, the second body, a man said to be a driver, was discovered by security forces at his residence near Saida, in southern Lebanon.

On 6 July, following the deepening economic crisis and regular power shortages in Lebanon, protesters took to the streets on Monday, shutting down roads and burning tires in the capital Beirut. In the Sanayeh area of Beirut, protests were also held by drivers outside the headquarters of the Interior Ministry, as they demanded for reduction of fuel prices and other charges. According to Arab News, security forces detained the Lebanese activist Pierre Hashash, further beating up two others among the protesters who came out to demonstrate against the detention of Hashash.

On 10 July, several Lebanese protesters alongside supporters of the Hezbollah group gathered outside the US embassy in Awkar, to protest against Washington's involvement in Lebanon, as well as express support for the Hezbollah group. The protesters threw stones at the security forces outside the embassy and made attempts to remove the barbed wire which was standing between them and the security forces. They also set American flags ablaze and ridiculed the US dollar bills, describing the US as supporters of terrorism. However, the riot police managed to quell the protest by leading the gathering away from the US embassy.

=== August protests ===
On 3 August, Lebanon's Foreign Minister Nassif Hitti reportedly tendered his resignation to the Prime Minister Hassan Diab, describing his fear of the country turning into a failed state due to the government's inability to enact reforms. The appointment of a new minister or caretaker has not been made yet, pending the acceptance of his resignation. According to VOA News, after the previous visit of the French Foreign Minister Jean-Yves Le Drian to the capital Beirut, he was criticized by Prime Minister Hassan Diab, which Hitti found to be disappointing. The Lebanese Foreign Minister also maintained that Diab's government had not expedited carrying out the reforms that International donors required. However, it is believed that Diab accepted the minister's resignation instantly and has already begun evaluating alternatives for a suitable replacement, his office stated according to France 24. Later in the afternoon on Monday, it was reported that President Michel Aoun's diplomatic adviser Charbel Wahbi, had been named as Hitti's successor.

On 4 August, dozens of Lebanese protesters attempted to force their way into the energy ministry's headquarters in Beirut, following power outages that left several areas in darkness. Security forces with batons managed to break up the crowd which had already made it past a barbed-wire fence. The protesters wanted to prepare a sit-in at the energy ministry, as one protester maintained that they will not vacate the premises until electricity is made available.

==== Beirut explosion protests ====
On the night of 6 August 2020, protests against the government resumed, following the explosion in Beirut two days prior that killed 218 people and wounded more than 7,000. The protesters gathered near the parliament building calling for the resignation of Lebanese government officials. The health ministry disclosed that despite search and rescue experts taking over the search for remaining survivors, at least 21 people were still missing. The protests turned violent, with officers using tear gas, and several people were wounded. 17 ambulances were dispatched by the Lebanese Red Cross to the protest site in order to assist those who were wounded. That same day, Emmanuel Macron arrived in Beirut. He was the first foreign head of state to do so since the blast. He promised France would donate to relief efforts and urged Lebanon's leaders to implement reforms.

More than 60,000 signed a petition to reintegrate Lebanon as a French colony for 10 years, but Macron rejected the idea and told the Lebanese people that it was up to them to fix their country.

On 8 August 2020, thousands of protesters stormed the Ministry of Foreign Affairs (Bustros Palace) during demonstrations. Security forces opened fire and clashed with the protesters, wounding more than 238 people, sixty-three of whom were taken to hospital; Saudi news channel Al-Hadath confirmed that a policeman was killed in an accident. Protesters also broke into the Ministry of Economy, Ministry of Environment, Ministry of Energy, and Association of Banks. They also broke into the offices of the ministries of housing and transport, the US News added. A Human Rights Watch investigation documented security forces employing metal pellets in multiple instances against protesters in the August 8 demonstration. All security forces have rejected the claims. In response to the protests and calls for the termination of his government, Prime Minister Diab promised to hold early elections, maintaining that his government would stay for two months until major parties can make a decision.

On 9 August, as the protests entered their second day, the fire reportedly broke out at the entrance of the parliament square, when angry protesters attempted breaking into the building. The broadcast was shown live on Lebanese TV, with security forces using tear gas to disperse hundreds of anti-government protesters gathered outside the building. By Sunday, three ministers stepped down following the explosion. The Lebanese Information Minister Manal Abdel Samad described Diab's government as a failure in terms of meeting the demands of the people of Lebanon. Also, Environment Minister Damianos Kattar lamented that the regime is incompetent and has missed chances for ensuring reforms.

On 11 August, findings by Amnesty International suggested that Lebanese security forces had applied unlawful use of force against protesters, during protests after the explosion in Beirut. Medical documents also showed evidence that protesters were targeted with live rounds and rubber bullets. Medics were also reportedly attacked on the scene, as they were attending to the wounded during the clash.

On 26 August, Human Rights Watch revealed that excessive use of force and live ammunition was applied against anti-government protesters by Lebanese security forces during demonstrations that took place after the Beirut explosion. They also added that some protesters were aimed at directly with tear gas, hitting some in the neck and head. Following these findings, HRW called for an independent investigation into the misconduct carried out by the Lebanese security forces. Lebanese security forces fired metal pellets at least two Lebanese protesters in early September, adding to a growing suspicion that police are employing previously unused tactics that impose serious and possibly deadly injuries.

As Lebanon turned 100 years old on September 1, 2020, riled protesters gathered to demand justice for those impacted by the port blast. They flung rocks and attempted to mount over the walls around Lebanon's heavily guarded Parliament in Beirut as law enforcement agents successfully shot tear gas and rubber bullets in order to scatter the crowd. The protest was the first significant rally since August 8, which left thousands of anti-government protesters injured as they were met with tear gas, rubber bullets, and live ammunition from security forces. During the protests, at least two protesters were said to have been injured as a result of metal pellets used by the Lebanese security forces, according to Al Jazeera.

On 3 September, 30 days after the devastating Beirut explosion, a rescue dog reportedly smelled something that the Chilean rescue thought might possibly be a heartbeat. A piece of equipment was deployed which was said to have picked up a pulse of 18 to 19 beats per minute, though rescuers say that despite the possibility of the pulse meaning someone is alive or in a coma, it could also be just an object producing a signal. Rescue teams dug through the rubble for hours, but unfortunately, they had to temporarily suspend the operation due to the fear that the building could collapse. Separately, the army revealed that four containers with 4.3 tonnes of ammonium nitrate were discovered outside Beirut's seaport, according to the BBC. The military disclosed that army experts had been invited in order to carry out an inspection of the containers with the dangerous chemical. However, the details of the owners or source of the chemicals was not disclosed, the Times of Israel added.

On 10 September, a huge fire reportedly broke out at Beirut's port which was believed to have originated from a warehouse where oil and tires were kept, the Lebanese army disclosed. The cause of the fire was not yet confirmed, CNN added. Although the fire was not yet extinguished, it was brought under control by the Lebanese civil defense fighters, with no casualties reported. However, the head of Lebanon's Red Cross George Kettaneh, stated that some people were experiencing shortness of breath.

On 12 September, the Lebanese Army reportedly clashed with anti-government protesters near the presidential palace in the suburb of Baabda. In an attempt to break up the gathering of protesters, the Lebanese soldiers were said to have fired rubber bullets and live rounds in the air, in order to prevent the protesters from reaching the presidential palace. The protesters criticized the lack of accountability by the authorities to look into the August 4 explosion that devastated the capital, as some of them held up black versions of the Lebanese flag as a sign of mourning those killed in the blast. Anti-government protesters were also reported to have clashed with rival protesters backing President Michel Aoun, Arab News added. Several Lebanese soldiers were said to have been wounded as a result of stones and tree branches thrown at them by some protesters.

On 15 September, following Beirut's August 4 explosion, a third fire erupted again in a Zaha Hadid-designed shopping centre in Beirut. Firefighters were able to bring the situation under control, as they managed to extinguish the flames, according to the Lebanese Civil Defense. The cause of the fire is yet to be determined, Al Jazeera added. So far, no casualties have been reported during the incident.

On 27 September 2020, Gebran Bassil's party said he was infected with a "mild" case of COVID-19 as cases continued to surge throughout Lebanon.

On 9 October 2020, a fuel tanker exploded, leaving at least four people dead and twenty injured. The blast occurred after the tank caught fire in the Tariq-al-Jdide district.

On 1 February 2021, fresh evidence revealed by Amnesty International suggested that the Lebanese security forces applied unlawful use of force and excessive tear gas to disperse protesters during the 2020 Beirut explosion protests in Lebanon.

==== Resignations ====
As of August 10 Lebanon's Prime Minister Hassan Diab and his cabinet resigned, and became interim prime minister until a new government is formed. Diab made the announcement while he was delivering a speech on Monday evening, blaming the country's ruling class for hindering reform plans. Following his speech, he proceeded to the presidential palace where President Michel Aoun approved the resignation of his cabinet. Despite the stepping down of Diab's government, Lebanese protesters have maintained that they would still not stop the demonstrations, VOA News reported.

On 31 August, Mustapha Adib, Lebanon's ambassador to Germany since 2013 was named as the new Prime Minister of Lebanon. His nomination came just the same day as the French President Emmanuel Macron's second planned visit to Lebanon within a month, to discuss various needs for reform. According to Lebanon's sectarian-based power-sharing system, Adib being a Sunni Muslim, makes him qualified to become Lebanon's PM. Adib's name was said to have emerged following a meeting between an influential group of previous PMs of Lebanon on Sunday, according to Al Jazeera.

After Mustapha Adib's nomination as new Prime Minister-designate, he urged for the formation of a new government and the implementation of immediate reforms, in order to reach an understanding with the IMF. The 48-year-old little-known diplomat was able to acquire 90 votes out of the 128-member parliament of legislators. 17 MPs were said to have voted for other candidates, with about a dozen other MPs either failing to be present or voting for no one, Al Jazeera added.

On Monday also, French President Emmanuel Macron visited Lebanon for the second time since the August 4 explosion which destroyed almost half of Beirut. Upon Macron's arrival at the Beirut International airport, he urged for the immediate establishment of a new cabinet. According to Macron, after his meeting with Lebanese leaders on Tuesday, they vowed to set up a new government within two weeks.

On 26 September, Mustapha Adib stepped down after failing to form a cabinet. His decision to step aside came after conducting a meeting with President Michel Aoun. Despite Adib's resignation, President Aoun has maintained that he remains obligated to ensure that Macron's initiative is still on course. According to DW, Adib particularly encountered a deadlock while nominating who would occupy the position of Finance Minister, as Lebanon's main Shiite groups, Hezbollah and Amal, both want to keep the position.

Following Mustapha Adib's resignation, French President Emmanuel Macron on 27 September, blamed Lebanon's leaders for being unable to establish a new government and described their failure as a betrayal. He added that he was embarrassed with the Lebanese political leaders during his news conference in Paris, stating that they had no regard for the commitments dedicated to France and the entire international community. He has also issued a warning to the Shiite group Hezbollah, which was held responsible for delaying the process of forming a new government, saying that the Iran-backed movement should not overestimate its powers. While ruling out the establishment of sanctions, the French President said he would allocate another four to six more weeks for Lebanon's political class to implement France's plans for economic and political reform.

=== October protests ===
On 17 October 2020, protesters gathered in Beirut and across Lebanon to celebrate the revolution's first anniversary. Roads were blocked as well as many gatherings amid the COVID-19 pandemic. The protesters waved the Lebanese flags, as they gathered in the epicenter of last year's rallies, Martyrs' Square. Also, dozens of protesters were said to have marched past the central bank, including the parliament building, after which they gathered near the port that was destroyed in the August 4 explosion. Despite arguing to proceed with the revolutionary movement, the Lebanese protesters have demanded President Michel Aoun step aside. However, during Aoun's address to the public, he maintained that he was not going to step down, and promised to see to the creation of a new cabinet.

On 19 October 2020, the General Director of the General Directorate of General Security Abbas Ibrahim tested positive for COVID-19 while in the United States. The Wall Street Journal reported that he had met national security adviser Robert C. O'Brien at the White House the week before to discuss American citizens held in Syria. The General Directorate of General Security said in a tweet that he was in good health. On 23 October 2020, he returned to Beirut.

On 22 October, Hariri was appointed Lebanon's Prime Minister. His appointment came after gaining the support of the majority of members of the parliament who met with President Aoun on Thursday, Reuters reported.

=== December ===
Mass student protests hit Lebanon as university students were angry about tuition payments and student loan and tuition hikes. They lit fires and came in their thousands in Beirut and a sea of flags was seen. Riot police clashed with protesters demanding the end of the government. Soon, they fired tear gas and water cannon as protesters threw eggs and stones. Arrests were made and stone throwing ended. Peaceful demonstrations continued after the clashes. There are no immediate reports of casualties in the unrest so far, according to Al Jazeera.

== 2021 protests ==
=== January protests ===
On 25 January, following the extension of a nationwide total lockdown by two weeks by the Lebanese authorities to curb the rising number of COVID-19 cases, angry protesters took to the streets, which led to heavy clashes with security forces. In Lebanon's northern city of Tripoli, eight people were reportedly wounded during the clashes, including three members of the Internal Security Forces.

On 26 January, as the anti-lockdown protests entered their second night, protesters threw rocks and broken glasses at army personnel, who responded with rubber bullets and tear gas. Tripoli's main square was shut down by the demonstrators, a military vehicle was also set ablaze, as well as targeting government buildings. According to the Lebanese Red Cross, the number of wounded people in Tripoli had reached at least 45 people, during the overnight clashes between the security forces and angry protesters. On Tuesday, the daily recorded number of COVID-19 deaths in Lebanon was said to have hit a new record with the number reaching 73, according to the ABC News.

On 27 January, the Lebanese caretaker Prime Minister Hassan Diab called on the protesters to engage in peaceful demonstrations and avoid the destruction of government facilities, as well as clashing with security forces. According to Al Jazeera, protesters rallied for their third consecutive night in Tripoli as it turned into riots. Police accordingly fired Live ammunition to disperse protesters. Many people were left wounded in the clashes. Reports have shown that one protester Omar Tayba, 29, was killed as a result of a bullet wound, making him the first fatality of the anti-lockdown protests.

On 28 January, following the death of one protester in the northern city of Tripoli, protesters returned to the city's main square, despite a 24-hour curfew being imposed by the Lebanese authorities in an attempt to tackle the rise in COVID-19 fatalities. So far, the number of injured people were said to have reached at least 220 people, alongside 26 police officers, according to Deutsche Welle.

On 31 January, according to the United Nations International Children's Emergency Fund (UNICEF), at least 70 children were wounded in Lebanon's northern city of Tripoli since the beginning of anti-lockdown protests last week. The organization called on the Lebanese security forces, including the protesters, to make sure that children are protected, by preventing their participation in all acts of violence.

=== March 2021 ===
On 2 March 2021, the Lebanese pound hit a new record against the dollar at L.L.10.000 to one dollar. Some areas in Lebanon have been reported to be experiencing power cuts for more than 12 hours a day because of the delay in the provision of fuel shipments, which has been caused by a shortage of hard currency. During the protests, protesters burnt tires and shut down several roads. Northern Tripoli's Abdul Hamid Karami Square was also closed by protesters, including Zahle Square in central Lebanon.

On 4 March, protesters returned to the streets, criticizing their leaders for being unable to create a new government. Protesters in Furn al-Shebak and Jal el Dib blocked main roads connecting Beirut to other cities by burning tires.

On 6 March, caretaker Prime Minister Hassan Diab threatened to stop performing his duties in an attempt to mount pressure on the Lebanese politicians to establish a new government. He also called on them to set aside their differences and create a new government, in order to prevent the country from rapidly escalating into more violence. On the same day, a small gathering of protesters were reported to have gathered outside the central bank in Beirut, requesting for their deposits to be made accessible. Subsequently, the protesters were said to have walked to the parliament building to express their agitations.

On 8 March, protesters continued to burn tires to shut down main roads, managing to shut down roads from Jal el-Dib, al-Dawra, and Zouk, to Beirut. Amnesty International called on the Lebanese authorities to immediately cease charging protesters and activists with terrorism-related accusations. Furthermore, Lebanon's Attorney General Judge Ghassan Oweidat instructed the country's top security forces and officials, including the Internal Security Forces (ISF) to go after perpetrators behind illicit foreign currency speculation and alteration with the Lebanese currency.

On Monday also, following several days of protests and road blockades in the streets of Lebanon, President Michel Aoun called on security forces to clear out the roadblocks set up by protesters. On the other hand, the Lebanese army chief General Joseph Aoun has emphasized the right to peaceful protest, as he cautioned the military personnel to avoid being dragged into the country's political stalemate.

On 10 March, following calls made by President Aoun to clear out obstructions, the Lebanese army disclosed that they had commenced the clearing out of the roadblocks which had been set up for several days by the Lebanese protesters.

On March 12, more than 1000 protesters started from the Interior Ministry in Hamra and headed towards the Parliament. This protest was considered as the largest in weeks.

On 13 March, the Lebanese currency reportedly hit a new record slide amid weeks of protests, with a black market rate of £L12,500 to the US dollar. Following the currency's decline, stores were said to have suspended selling goods, while businesses decided to shut down their doors, according to Arab News. A small group of protesters gathered near the parliament building in the afternoon, hurling stones at security forces who responded with tear gas, in an attempt to break up the crowd. Some demonstrators also attempted to force their way in by trying to penetrate a metal gate connecting to the legislature.

After the anger among the Lebanese, President Michel Aoun and Prime minister-designate Saad Hariri held immediate talks in the presidential palace. After that, on March 17, the President told Hariri that he should form a government immediately and that if he isunable to do so "he should make way for those who are". Aoun also maintained that inaction was no longer a choice for the PM-designate Hariri, as he must choose between stepping down or forming a government.

On March 20, on the eve of Mother's Day, a group of women protested and went from Bechara Al Khoury towards Beirut and the port shouting and crying due to the crisis in the country.

On March 22, and after several meetings between Prime Minister-designate Saad Hariri and President Aoun, Hariri said that the demands of the President were "unacceptable", therefore Lebanon witnessed a failure to form a new government which will worsen the crisis. According to Hariri, President Aoun presented him with a line-up granting his team a third of all cabinet seats, which would enable them to have veto power over decision making in the Lebanese government. Harir was said to have been criticized by Aoun for disclosing his proposed government with the media, because the distribution of the ministries was unjust which was his reason for not agreeing to the line-up, according to Al Jazeera. After the meeting which only lasted for just 35 minutes, another date for a new meeting between Hariri and Aoun could not be confirmed.

On 23 March, central streets in Beirut were closed by protesters, following the outcome of the political meeting between the Lebanese prime minister-designate Saad Hariri and President Michel Aoun.

On March 28, the Lebanese Communist Party arranged a protest in the capital Beirut amid a worsening economic and living situation in Lebanon. Despite tight security, the protesters gathered in front of the Central Bank, then moved to the Government Palace while holding banners demanding various basic social amenities.

On March 29, the parliament approved $200 million in emergency funding to avoid the national power cut that might hit the country by the end of March. Former energy minister and member of parliament, Cesar Abi Khalil maintained that it is expected to make electricity sufficient for about two months.

On March 30, families of students studying abroad protested against Lebanese banks and tried to raid a closed bank while staff worked inside. Their protest was because their children were expelled from their universities because the parents couldn't send them money due to the rise of the exchange rate of the dollar.

Separately, a report by Human Rights Watch (HRW) suggested that during the lockdown and worsening economy protests in Lebanon's Tripoli, demonstrators were allegedly tortured by the Lebanese military intelligence. Apart from the torture of detainees, the HRW also added that others were forcefully abducted by the military.

=== April 2021 ===
In April 2021, The US undersecretary of state for political affairs, David Hale, visited Lebanon and met President Michel Aoun. After the meeting, Hale issued a warning against "those who continue to obstruct progress on the reform agenda."

=== May 2021 ===
On 14 May, Lebanese protesters reportedly gathered near the border fence with Israel in order to show support for Palestinians during its present conflict with Israel. As the angry demonstrators were trying to cross the border fence, a Lebanese protester was said to have been shot and killed as a result of shelling by Israeli security forces. According to Al-Monitor, two other Lebanese protesters were also wounded. President Michel Aoun criticized the use of force applied by the Israeli forces when they started firing at the group of protesters.

=== June 2021 ===
On 21 June, protesters took to the streets, following newly adopted measures to tackle fuel smuggling into Syria. The protesters burnt tires and metal bars, shutting down a highway linking Lebanon and Syria, Alarabiya news reported. Security forces were said to have stopped gasoline smugglers from driving through the legitimate crossing, which led to the blockage of the Masnaa crossing by the smugglers. In Lebanon's eastern Bekaa region, the customs authorities stated that it would impose the use of permits for vehicles going into Syria, in an attempt to curb fuel smuggling. However, the protesters blocking the highway are urging for the permit to either be binding on everyone going to Syria or canceled completely.

On 26 June, protesters clashed with security forces in Lebanon's Tripoli and other cities, as the Lebanese currency plunges to a record low. In Tripoli, several protesters were reportedly wounded during the clashes. The Lebanese army however maintained that 10 soldiers were wounded after protesters hurled stones at troops and also threw stun grenades at them.

On 28 June, several roads were shut down by the Lebanese protesters, ahead of the fuel prices hike that is expected to be announced by the energy ministry on 29 June.

On 29 June, fuel prices were hiked by more than 35 percent by the Lebanese energy ministry, following the cutting down of subsidies last week. The delay by the Lebanese central bank in opening credit lines to fund fuel imports, was described by fuel importers as the reason behind the crisis, the Arab News added.

On 30 June, the situation in the northern city of Tripoli worsened, with a child dying who was on oxygen, as a result of power cuts and shortage of diesel for the generators. Following the use of live ammunition, armored vehicles had to be deployed to the streets by the Lebanese Army, in order to restore calm to the city.

=== July 2021 ===
On 9 July, protests were held in Lebanon's capital Beirut, as families of victims of the 2020 Beirut explosion mount pressure on parliament to punish officials. Prior to the protest, caretaker Interior Minister Mohammed Fahmi, denied a request by the judge investigating the explosion to question the head of the General Security Agency, Maj.-Gen. Abbas Ibrahim, according to the JPost. The protesters demanded the immunity of three legislators be lifted, in line with the request made by the judge looking into the blast at the Beirut port. The Lebanese army and parliamentary guards were said to have clashed with some of the families of victims who tried to force their way into the headquarters of Speaker Nabih Berri in Beirut.

On 15 July, Lebanon's Prime Minister-designate Saad Hariri, reportedly stepped aside, after a brief meeting the Lebanese President Michel Aoun at Baabda Palace, according to Al Jazeera. Hariri described his reason for stepping down due to failure to reach an agreement with Aoun after their 20-minute meeting. He also disclosed to reporters that President Aoun had rejected the cabinet selection he had submitted in less than 24 hours. Following the news of Hariri's resignation, some protesters, mostly Hariri's, were said to have shut down roads in the capital Beirut, including the burning of tires, as they denounced the worsening economic situation.

On 25 July, Lebanese billionaire and former PM Najib Mikati received backing from Lebanese Sunni leaders to become Lebanon's prime minister-designate. Mikati also received support from Speaker Nabih Berri, Amal Movement, with Hezbollah's backing expected to follow.

On 26 July, in an effort to appointing a new PM-designated, President Michel Aoun began discussions with the country's parliamentary bloc earlier in the morning, at the Baabda Palace. On Monday also, the Lebanese Tycoon Najib Mikati, was said to have met with the Lebanese President Michel Aoun, and he is also expected to gain a majority of support from the parliamentary bloc.

Later on Monday, Najib Mikati was confirmed by the Lebanese parliament as Lebanon's new prime minister-designate. During the parliamentary consultation with the Lebanese president, the two-time prime minister was said to have secured a majority of the votes from MPs. The US and France also welcomed the new appointment made by the Lebanese government, the Deutsche Welle added. Following Mikati's appointment, he urged for unity, in order to start reviving the country's crippling economy.

=== August 2021 ===
On 4 August, dozens of Lebanese rallied in the capital Beirut, to mark the first anniversary of the 2020 Beirut explosion. At least six people were reported to have been injured, as protesters clashed with security forces near the parliament. Just a day before the anniversary protests, Human Rights Watch (HRW), blamed the Lebanese authorities for hindering the investigation into the blast, according to the TRT World.

Meanwhile, during an international donor conference that was held on the first anniversary of the massive Beirut port explosion, French President Emmanuel Macron blamed Lebanese politicians for the economic woe in Lebanon. Macron also called for support, while pointing out that the COVID-19 pandemic has left the Lebanese people in a more dire condition, including the lack of medicines.

On 9 August, three men were killed in Lebanon, amid tensions over fuel shortages. According to a statement by the Lebanese army, one of the men was killed in northern Lebanon's Dinniyeh region during a dispute over fuel, while the two others were killed in Tripoli. In Tripoli, reports suggested that the dispute escalated to the extent of throwing a hand grenade, including the exchange of fire, Al Jazeera added.

On 12 August, angry Lebanese protesters shut down roads across Lebanon, following the central bank's move to end fuel subsidies. One protester was seriously wounded in the southern village of Zahrani, after being run over by a motorist, according to ABC News.

On 15 August, a fuel tanker exploded in northern Lebanon's Akkar District, killing 20 people and wounding at least 79 people more. Reports from the National News Agency suggested that the explosion was a result of a fuel container blowing up, that was seized by the army. More than 200 people were believed to have been at the scene when the incident took place. According to Deutsche Welle, the Lebanese Health Minister Hamad Hassan has stated that the government would sponsor the medical treatment of those affected by the explosion. Also, Kuwait has offered to sponsor the treatment for the burn victims of the blast, the Kuwait Red Crescent Society (KRCS) stated.

=== September 2021 ===
On 16 September, an arrest warrant was issued for the former public works minister Youssef Finianos, by the leading judge investigating the 2020 Beirut explosion. According to Al Jazeera, the warrant was issued after Finianos failed to show up for questioning. The leading judge Tarek Bitar also charged three former top government officials alongside Finianos, with endangerment, which saw to the deaths of over 200 people in the Beirut blast.

Meanwhile, the EU has demanded the establishment of a resolution within the UN framework, to look into the devastating Beirut Port blast. During a vote, 571 out of 681 members of the European Parliament supported the resolution which is aimed at approving sanctions on Lebanese officials who were involved in corruption or were responsible for hindering the investigation into the blast. The EU also urged for humanitarian aid to be distributed directly to the people requiring assistance, considering the extreme mishandling of relief funds provided to Lebanon in the past.

=== October Tayouneh clashes ===
On October 14, 2021, a protest in Beirut, led by the Amal Movement, Hezbollah and the Marada Movement, demanded the resignation of the lead judge probing the 2020 Beirut port's explosion. As the protest went on and the situation got more violent when protesters began to shout sectarian slogans, destroy property and harass passersby in the region of Tayouneh, snipers from roofs started shooting against the protestors in the streets, giving start to the clashes between Shia militants and armed civilians that killed 7 people and wounded 32 more. Hezbollah accused the Lebanese Forces, a Christian political group; the group denied the accusation. The gunfight included assault rifles and rocket-propelled grenades. Some of the deceased include a militant who had previously fought in Syria under Hezbollah.

== 2022 ==
=== Riad Salemeh trials ===
In February 2022, a subpoena was issued by Judge Ghada Aoun after Riad Salameh failed to show up to court for questioning, while his whereabouts were unknown after a raid in his office and 2 homes, as part of an investigation for alleged misconduct and corruption. This sparked controversy with another security agency that was accused of protecting him from trial. Later in March 21, Salameh along with his brother Raja were charged for illicit enrichment by Ghassan Oueidat but also failed to attend for questioning. His brother, Raja Salameh spent a month in detention but was released on May 22 while on a record bail of 100 billion Lebanese pounds.

On June 21, 2022, his home was raided again by Lebanese security forces.

== Role of women in the October Revolution ==
Feminist movements have been widely recognized for their significant role in driving social change and advocating for gender equality globally. The October 17 Revolution in Lebanon was characterized by the substantial participation of women, which underscores the country's legacy of feminist activists, as well as the participation of other marginalized groups such as the LGBT movement and migrant workers. UN Women estimates indicate that during the initial phase of protests, women constituted at least half of the protest population in Beirut and Tripoli, and one-third in Baalbek and Nabatieh, showcasing a remarkable gender parity that is de facto unseen in many revolts across the Middle-Eastern and North Africa region. This level of participation serves to illustrate Lebanon's active civil society and the enduring legacy of feminist activism. Driven by grievances related to governance, corruption, and economic challenges, women from diverse backgrounds emerged as key figures in shaping and sustaining the movement.

In the years preceding the October uprising, Lebanon witnessed the emergence of a feminist public sphere, where women's organizations and groups played a cruicial role in highlighting issues of gender inequality. Through lobbying efforts and activism, feminists pushed for legal reforms to address institutional inequalities and provide platforms to foster solidarity. In drawing upon past movements such as the 2011 protests against sectarianism and the 2015 garbage crisis protests, women entered the October Revolution with a wealth of experience in grassroots activism.

What distinguished the October uprising was its wide-ranging audience, offering feminist activists unprecedented opportunities to address national issues in highly networked and media-savvy environments. Campaigns aiming to criminalize domestic violence and sexual harassment gained traction, shedding light on systemic challenges faced by women. These efforts succeeded in raising awareness about women's experiences in intimate relationships and within families, amplifying their voices nationally.

=== Activists, mobilizers and organizers ===
Women in the protests have taken on diverse roles, encompassing the leadership of political organization, the planning of rallies and marches, the writing of articles, and the generation of messaging through slogans and signs. Women have also been engaged in a range of activities within public discussions pertaining to a variety of issues, including political reforms, environmental concerns, and the necessity of a unified personal status law. In addition, women have organized public educational sessions and created environments conducive to women's safety, as evidenced by the establishment of a camp in downtown Beirut. Additionally, they have extended support to protesters by offering practical assistance, including cooking, distributing supplies, providing legal aid and leading initiatives for waste management at protest sites. These demonstrations have not only created new avenues for dialogue on women's rights and political participation, especially in regions with conservative gender norms, but have also facilitated increased access to public spaces for women, notably during nighttime. Consequently, they have cultivated increased societal acceptance of their involvement in politics.

=== Intersectional advocacy ===
Women's involvement in the protests marks a turning point for gender equality, challenging entrenched patriarchal norms and discriminatory laws. Some of the questionable practises that are used on marginalized minorities consist of hymen and anal exams. Where the role of medical evidence is used to oppress and control bodies. Moreover, they have embraced an approach including feminism and intersectionality, addressing multiple forms of oppression, with the objective of promoting social justice and inclusivity as noted by Sarah Boukhary, the Interim MENA Co-director of WILPF. Feminist groups engage in advocacy efforts such as organizing vigils for marginalized groups and protesting against racism and homophobia, while also addressing systemic issues like the Kafala system, refugee exploitation, and LGBTQ+ discrimination. The Kafala system particularly affects female migrant workers in Lebanon, subjecting them to exploitation and inequality due to unclear contracts and institutional structures.

Women have been instrumental in pushing for reforms to Lebanon's sectarian system, aiming to achieve equal rights in citizenship and inheritance. Lebanon's legal system comprises 15 sectarian personal status laws, which allow for discrimination based on gender and religion, affecting marriage, nationality rights, and child custody. A Human Rights Watch report revealed significant gender disparities in divorce and childcare access among women of all religious backgrounds. Additionally, women's political representation remains disproportionately low, with only 3% of Parliament being women following the 2018 elections.

=== Tactics ===
The active involvement of women in Lebanon during the uprising showcased a departure from solely traditional non-confrontational methods, as they adeptly employed both confrontational and non-confrontational approaches. While confrontational tactics like marches and protests directly challenged the status quo, non-confrontational methods such as boycotts and petitions provided indirect yet impactful avenues for advocacy.

Although the prevalence of violence against women was not as high as that against men, it did occur and affected some women. This manifested as instances where women were beaten or attempted to breach barriers blocking access to key locations. The symbolic act of Malak Alaywe Herz kicking an armed bodyguard on the revolution's first night emerged as a powerful metaphor against the corrupt and patriarchal political system. It resonated with those involved in the uprising and became an iconic image of resistance. These findings challenge previous research that assigned specific tactics and roles to women and men, as corroborated by feminist activists on the ground.

Despite employing diverse tactics, women predominantly engaged in peaceful conflict resolution. This was evidenced by their participation in organized marches in Tripoli and Baalbek, which aimed to address politico-sectarian tensions. They also led rallies, blocked roads, and de-escalated violence. Additionally, they played a pivotal role in providing a physical buffer between protesters and security forces during moments of heightened tension. By utilising platforms such as WhatsApp to swiftly coordinate and assemble at protest sites and form a human barrier to prevent the escalation of violence, they also played with gendered norms to mitigate violence.

For instance, older women strategically invoked the concept of motherhood when engaging with soldiers, using phrases like "Don't harm us, I could be your mom," to appeal to their sense of compassion and discourage violence. Additionally, women act as informal mediators, negotiating access at roadblocks and diffusing conflicts between armed forces and protesters. Women-led unity marches in Beirut, Jal Al-Deeb, and Tripoli followed nights of violence, leading to a significant decrease in politicized violence for nearly two weeks. These efforts align with global trends suggesting that women's active involvement reduces the likelihood of armed conflict in protests.

=== Public reaction ===
While local and international media extensively covered women's participation in the protests, some reports sensationalized their involvement, labeling the uprising as "female-led" or a "women's uprising", feminist activists expressed concerns about this representation, fearing it could reinforce gender divides and overshadow the broader concerns shared by all participants.

Female participants faced notable backlash, often being objectified and subjected to derogatory comments, contradicting the movement's aim to combat such behavior. For example, an Arab newspaper titled an article on feminist protests as "Lebanese babes: all beautiful women are revolting." Furthermore, demonstrators against the Kafala system were subjected to racist and sexist remarks by bystanders, which underscores the interconnected systemic challenges in Lebanon.

=== Post-revolution status of women in Lebanon ===
In the aftermath of Lebanon's 2019 October Revolution, women's progress has been impeded by a series of crises, including the global pandemic of 2020, the economic collapse, and the Beirut Port explosion. These events had a disproportionate impact on women, resulting in increased gender-based violence, higher unemployment rates, and a decline in overall safety. The UNHCR's report indicates that the COVID-19 pandemic led to an increase in gender-based violence, with 54% of women reporting an increase in abuse and harassment, while almost 44% reported a decline in their sense of safety at home. The economic crisis has led to a projected surge in female unemployment rates, with women's unemployment expected to increase by 63%. The August 4 Beirut Port blast further compounded these challenges, threatening employment opportunities and exacerbating the risk of gender-based violence and harassment, particularly among displaced women.

Consequently, Lebanon experienced a 13-place decline in the World Economic Forum's 2023 gender equality ranking, with the country now ranking 132nd out of 146 countries. The cessation of recognition of foreign civil marriages by the General Directorate of Personal Status in September 2022, for instance, represents a regression in women's rights, as documented by Human Rights Watch in 2024. Despite a notable increase in female candidates in the 2022 parliamentary elections, women continue to be underrepresented in political leadership. With only 6.4% of parliamentary seats held by women, as per UN Women Lebanon's 2022 report, achieving gender parity remains a significant challenge in the country's political landscape.

== General analysis and reactions ==
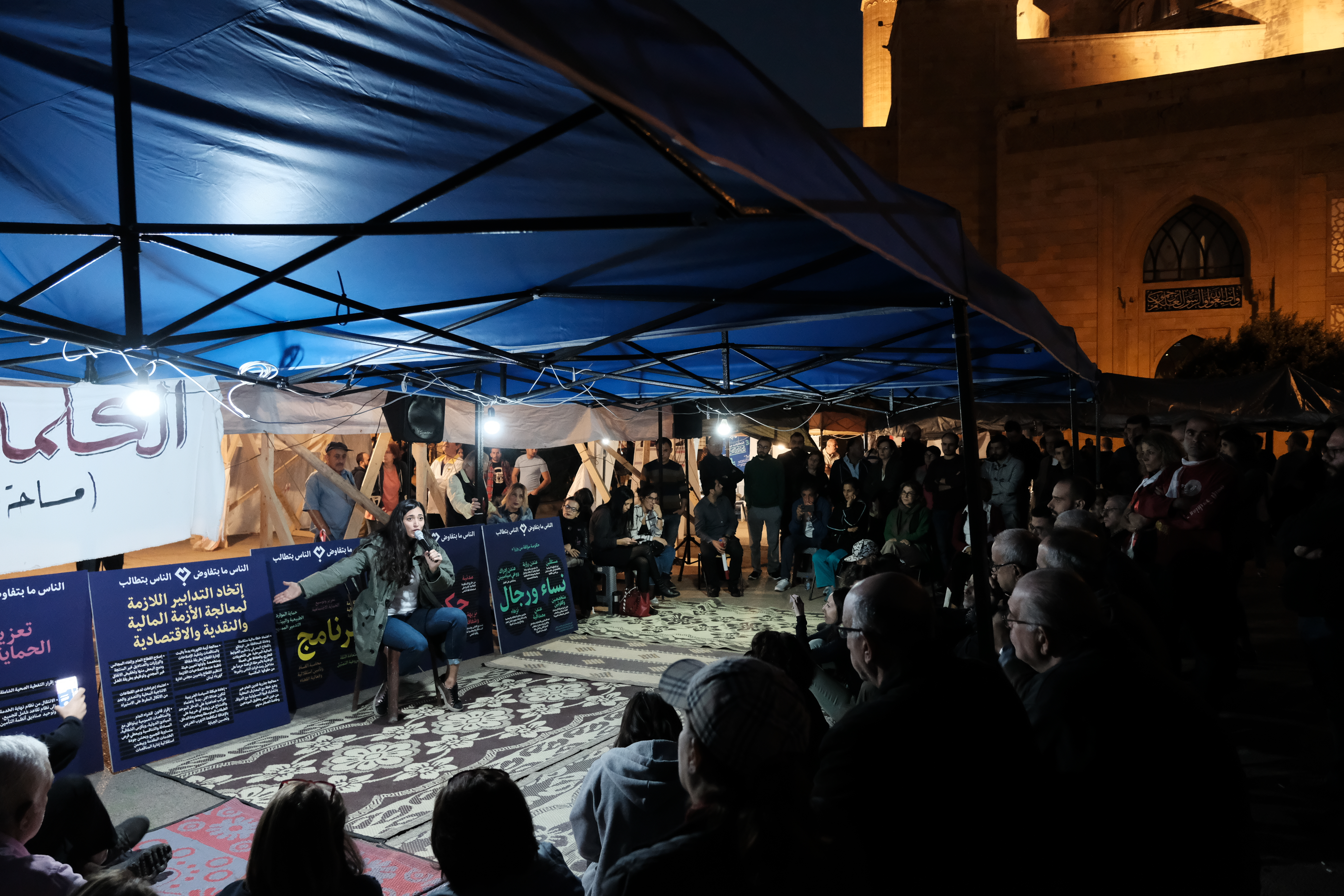
Debate tent in Beirut's Martyr's Square discussing economic policy, hosted by Beirut Madinati.

In contrast to the 2005 Cedar Revolution, in which support for the main sides of the political conflict were aligned with political parties and the Sunni–Shiite Muslim sociological and religious divide in Lebanon, the 2015–2016 Lebanese protests started to include criticism of leaders within the anti-Hezbollah community. The 2019 protests bypassed this sociological divide further, as they were part of a genuine grassroots movement that has not been directed by any political party, cross-sectarian in a broader sense than those of 2015 and taking place across Lebanon, rather than only in Beirut. The protests are an existential threat to the Lebanese government and political elite and a revolution. The 2019 society-wide nature of the protests has its seed in the 2015–2016 protests. Although these protests were not conclusive and did not achieve their main goal of dismantling the political system as intended, they were beneficial on many levels.

=== International reactions ===
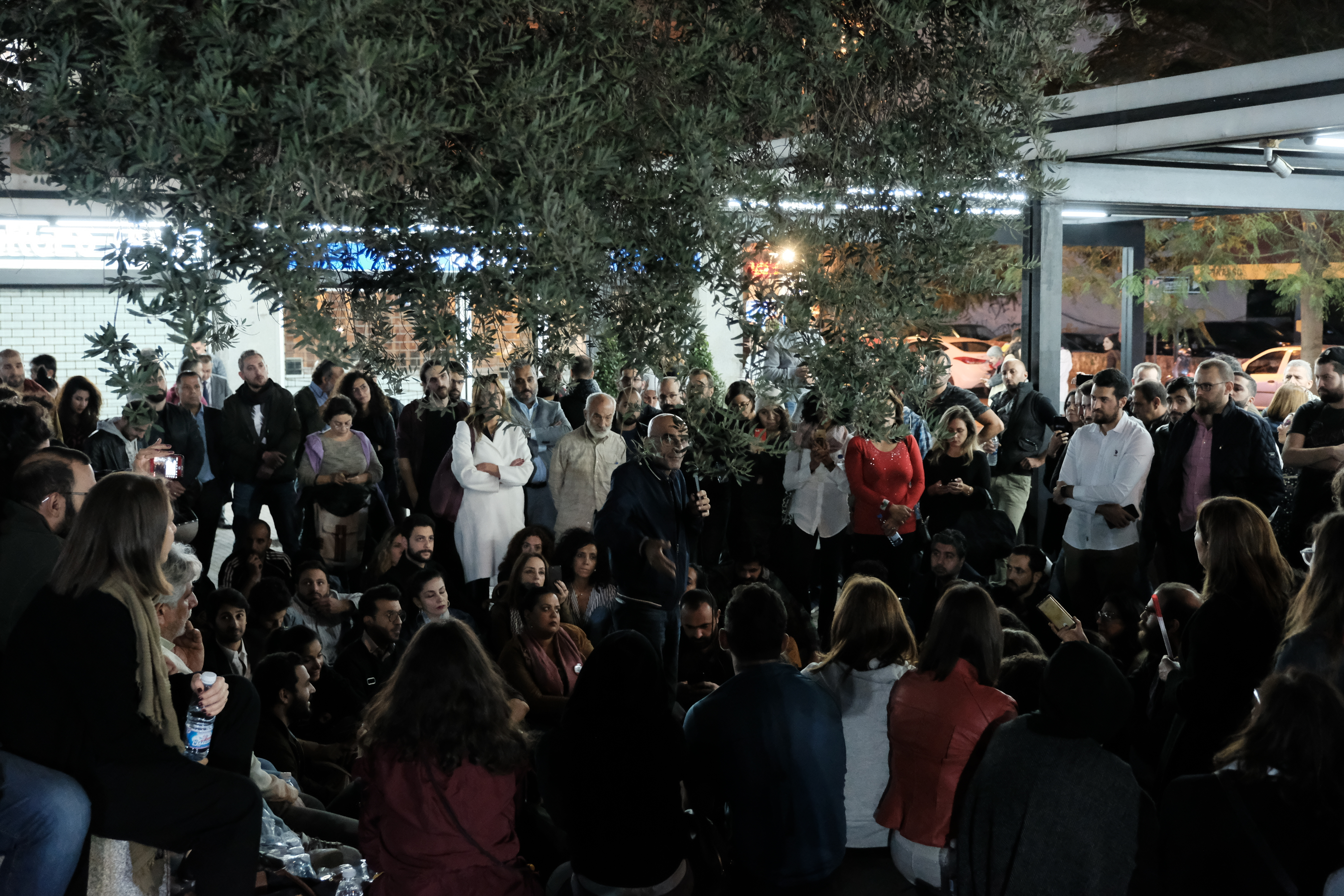
Investigative journalist Mohammad Zbeeb gives a talk about his reporting about public sector corruption. Beirut, 28 November 2019.

- U.S. Secretary of State Mike Pompeo – "The Iraqi and Lebanese people want their countries back. They are discovering that the Iranian regime's top export is corruption, badly disguised as revolution. Iraq and Lebanon deserve to set their own courses free from Khamenei's meddling."
- U.S. Senator Elizabeth Warren – "I support the Lebanese people protesting and demanding their government take care of all of its people, not just the rich and powerful."
- U.S. Senator Bernie Sanders – "The Arab Spring rose up to fight corruption, repression, inequality, and austerity. The Lebanon and Iraq protests show this spirit is still very much alive."
- Iranian Supreme Leader Ali Khamenei – "The people have justifiable demands, but they should know their demands can only be fulfilled within the legal structure and framework of their country."
- Spokesperson for Global Affairs Canada Barbara Harvey – "Canada calls on all Lebanese parties and leaders to reject violence and encourage a peaceful and timely transition to a new government, which respects and responds to the will of the Lebanese people."
- French Foreign Minister Jean-Yves Le Drian – "Prime Minister Hariri resigned a few moments ago, which in a way makes the crisis even more serious. [...] Lebanon's stability depends on a willingness to listen to people and their demands." France also proposed a comprehensive list of reforms it is pressuring Lebanon to implement before 2021 in order for it to receive international aid.

== Aftermath ==
Despite the relaxation of the civil disorder upon Lebanese government formation in September 2021, the country continued experiencing economic and civil difficulties. The Lebanese energy market practically collapsed upon fuel shortage and on October 9, the country plunged into a 24-hour national blackout, as power plants ran out of fuel.

The security situation deteriorated on October 14, as militant clashes erupted in Beirut between the pro-Hezbollah camp and their opposition, resulting in 6 deaths. The violence erupted during a protest organized by Hezbollah and its allies against the lead judge probing 2020 explosion in the city's port. The location of the clashes was the Justice Palace, located along the former front line between Muslim Shiite and Christian areas.

By January 2022, BBC News reported that the crisis in Lebanon had deepened further, with the value of the Lebanese pound plummeting and a scheduled general election expected to be delayed indefinitely. The same month there was a general strike across the country by the public transportation and labour unions.

=== In politics ===
Many reformist groups emerged during the 2018 Lebanese general elections standing against the 9-year ruling and mostly repeat deputies in parliament and sought for change. Most notable of the group was the Kuluna Watani alliance. The alliance gathered with a new Political Party ("Sabaa") and 10 different campaign and groups, most of which are connected to campaigns started in the protest movements of 2015 or the municipal elections of 2016. The alliance included in addition to Sabaa which is a nationwide secular Political Party few local political groups, namely Libaladi in Beirut 1 and Lihaqqi in Mount Lebanon 4. Speaking at inauguration event, Charbel Nahas, whose party Citizens within a State joined the Koullouna Watani lists at a later stage, said the purpose of the lists was to provide an alternative to the "corrupted" power in Lebanese politics. The Shiite Taharror movement was also established in the wake of the protests.

==== 2022 elections ====
During the 2022 Lebanese general elections, many activists and previous organizations expressed intent to run with goals of replacing the political class and reforming the country. These organizations include, Citizens in a State which ran under the Qadreen lists, Shamaluna which ran in the North III district and the Mada network which was made out of multiple smaller reform groups. Many older and tradition parties joined October 17 lists such as the historic National Bloc Party and the Lebanese Communist Party and other larger parties claimed to be members of the movement like the Kataeb party, the Independence Movement and the Popular Nasserist Organization (PNO).

In total, these candidates received 237,667 votes (13.14%) and won 13 seats which formed a new reformist bloc in the Lebanese parliament.

Name	Election Area	Political Affiliation	Seat
Cynthia Fadi Zarazir	Beirut 1	ReLebanon	Christian Minorities
Paula Sirakan Yacobian	Beirut 1	Tahalof Watani	Armenian Orthodox
Ibrahim Mneimneh	Beirut 2	Beirut Tuqawem	Sunni
Melhem Khalaf	Beirut 2	Independent	Greek Orthodox
Waddah Sadek	Beirut 2	Khatt Ahmar	Sunni
Rami Fanj	North 2 – Tripoli	Independent	Sunni
Michel Chawki El Doueihy	North 3 – Zgharta	Osos Lebanon	Maronite
Halima Ibrahim Kaakour	Mount Lebanon 4 – Chouf	Lana	Sunni
Mark Bahjat Daou	Mount Lebanon 4 – Chouf	Taqqadum	Druze
Najat Saliba	Mount Lebanon 4 – Chouf	Taqqadum	Maronite
Elias Fares Jradeh	South 3 – Marjeyoun-Hasbaya	Independent	Greek Orthodox
Firas Ismail Hamdan	South 3 – Marjeyoun-Hasbaya	Independent	Druze
Yassin Yassin	Bekaa 2 – West Bekaa-Rashaya	Independent	Sunni

==== 2022 speakership elections ====
Along with many others, it was in nature for October 17 MPs to opt out on voting for long-time speaker Nabih Berri. For the deputy speaker the MPs voted for newly elected MP Ghassan Skaff however he still lost to long-time politician Elias Bou Saab.

The 2 secretaries of parliament were elected immediately after the Deputy Speaker. Although not constitutionally required, it was decided that the secretaries would be attributed to one Maronite Christian and one Druze.

The election process of the 2 deputies had large debate particularly by opposition MPs. It was suggested that each MP votes for both preferences in the same ballot and that the positions should not be based on religion. However, it was decided that voting would take place on the basis of one name per ballot. As a result of this Firas Hamdan, an opposition MP, who was one of few candidates for the Druze secretary, withdrew his candidacy in protest of the sectarian electoral procedure.

==== Disagreements ====
The newly formed bloc continuously faced disagreements with each other, like voting on the premiership and the presidency, failure to create common grounds with other parliamentary blocs and failing to unite with the parliament opposition. This led to the withdrawal of 2 MPs from the bloc, Michel Doueihy of Osos Lebanon and Waddah Sadek of Khatt Ahmar, both citing political tensions.

== See also ==
- 1991-1992 Lebanese protests
- 2006-2008 Lebanese protests
- 2011 Lebanese protests
- 2015–2016 Lebanese protests
- 2019–2021 Chilean protests
- 2019–2021 Iraqi protests
- 2020s in political history
- Politics of Lebanon
