= Elias Bayssari =

Lebanese major general (born 1964)

- الياس البيسري
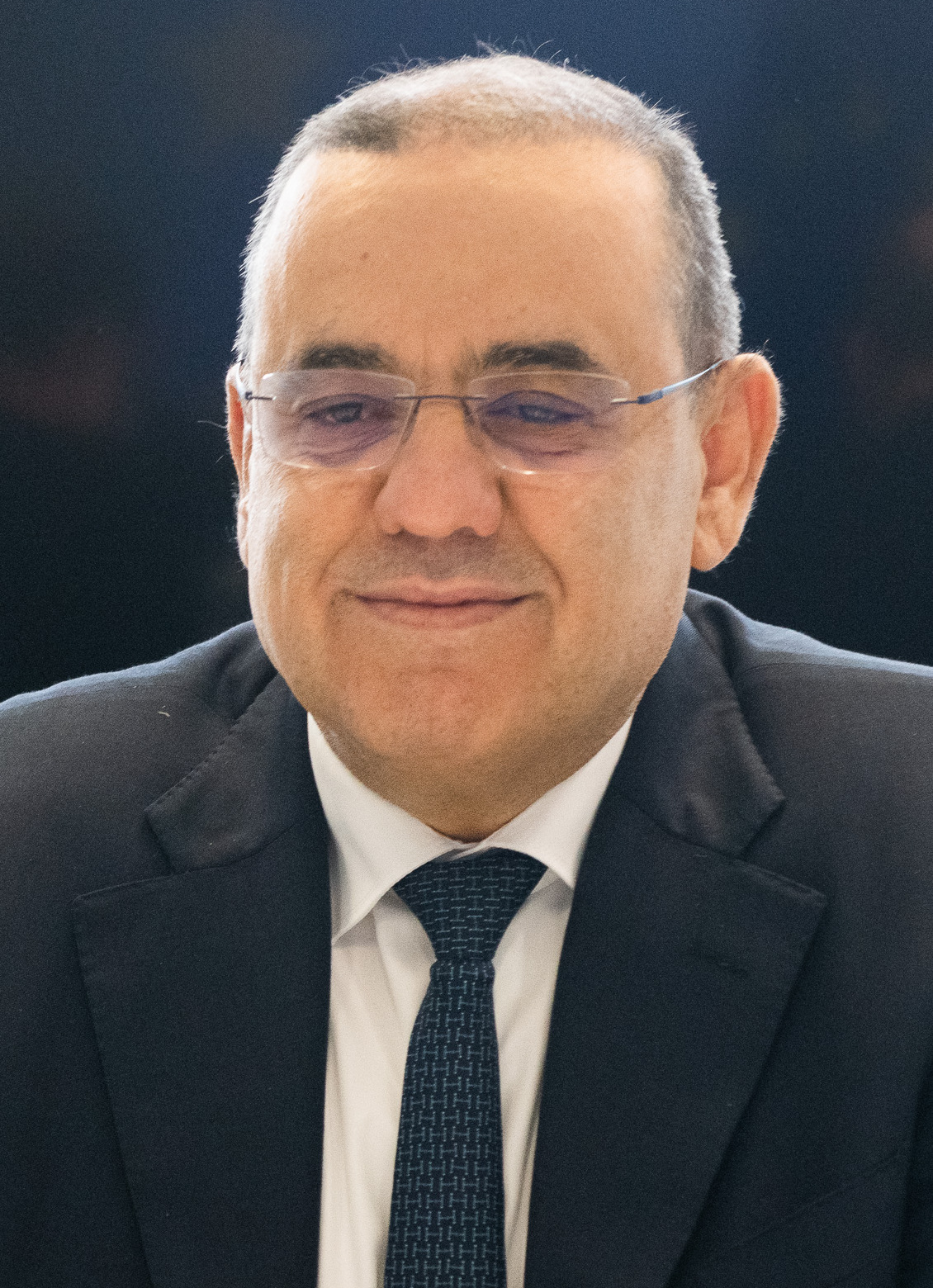
- Bayssari in 2024
- Born: 4 December 1964 (age 61); Haouch Hala, Zahle District, Lebanon
- Children: 3

Elias Bayssari (Arabic: الياس البيسري; born 4 December 1964) is a Lebanese major general who served as the acting general director of the General Directorate of General Security.

== Early life and education ==
Elias Baysarri was born in 1964 to a Maronite family from Haouch Hala. He joined the army in 1986 after studying at the military academy. In 1995, he took up a post in Beirut’s intelligence services and then served in the army’s intelligence service.

Baysarri obtained a bachelors degree in law at the Lebanese University and obtained a masters and PhD in the same field.

== Career ==
In 2000, he was assigned to the office of the president of the republic during Emile Lahoud’s tenure until 2004 where he was also temporary assigned to the interior ministry in 2004 and then to the defense ministry in 2005 under Elias Murr where they became close companions.

On 12 July 2005, Murr and Baysarri were targeted by a circa 20-kg improvised explosive device in the city of Antelias. Baissari spent a month in a coma but recovered and returned to his post. According to various sources, the assassination attempt is linked to Hezbollah's assassination squad - Unit 121.

After joining the General Directorate of General Security in 2005, he was put in charge of the office of former Director General Abbas Ibrahim. In 2019, Bayssari temporarily served as the acting head of General Security when Ibrahim was abroad. On March 2, 2023, he was appointed by the minister of interior and municipalities to direct the General Directorate of General Security replacing Abbas Ibrahim who retired. His appointment as acting director general was initially set for a period of 6 months or until a new president is elected and a new government is formed. The medical committee of General Security approved the extension of Bayssari's commission for nine months, despite questions about his fitness due to injuries from the 2005 car bomb attack.

In 2024, Bayssari's name was put forward by Qatar, represented by its special envoy to Lebanon Jassem al-Thani (Abu Fahd), who suggested his candidacy to fill in the presidential vacuum to succeed Michel Aoun. Bayssari had a "non-confrontational personality" and "He has never tried to provoke anyone" which led to his suggestion. He also has maintained good relations with all political groups in Lebanon which made him become considered by the Amal Movement and Hezbollah.
