= Visa requirements for South African citizens =

Entry restrictions by the authorities of other states placed on citizens of South Africa

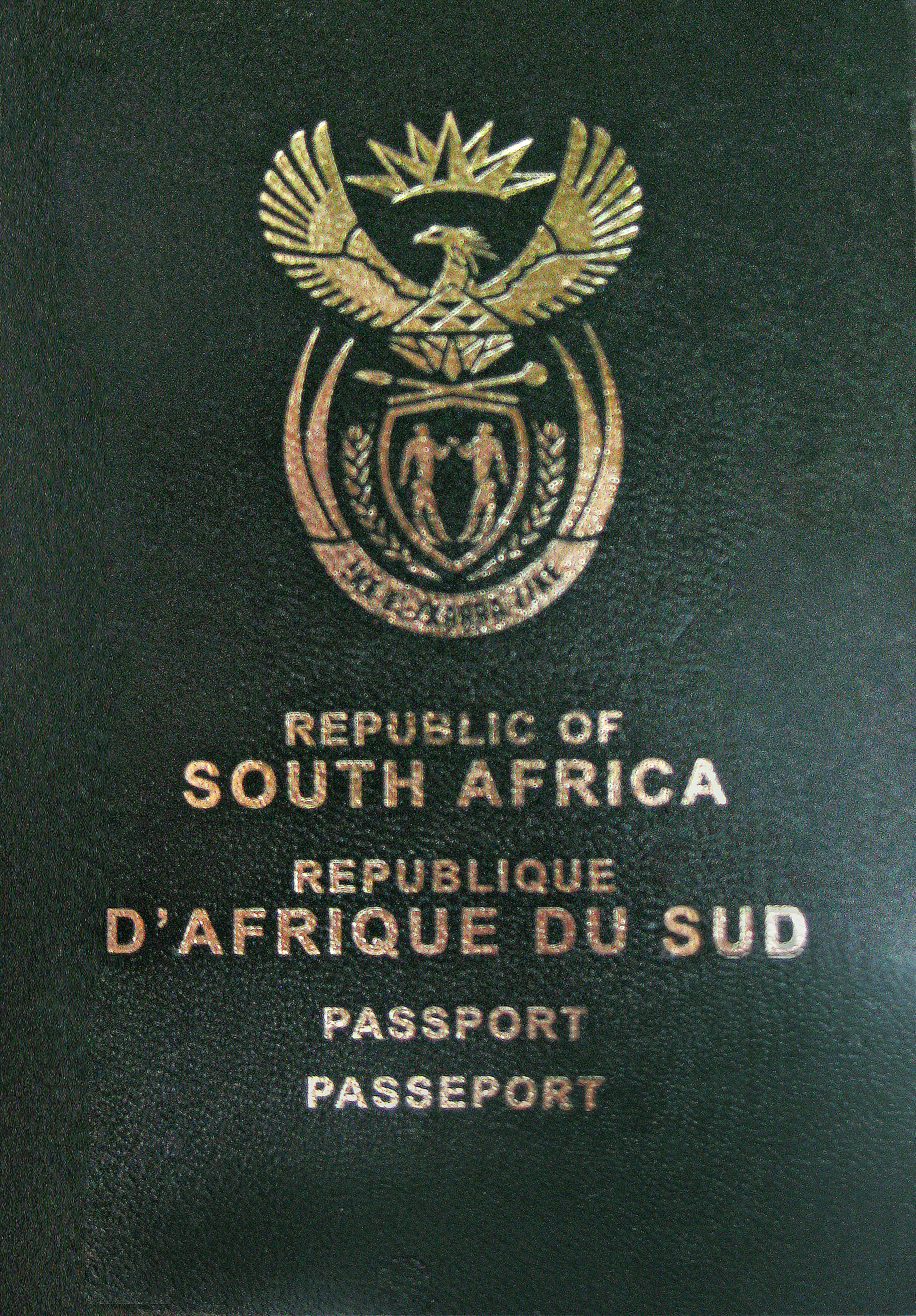
A South African passport

Visa requirements for South African citizens are administrative entry restrictions by the authorities of other states placed on citizens of the Republic of South Africa.

As of 2026, South African citizens had visa-free or visa on arrival access to 100 countries and territories, ranking the South African passport 46th in the world according to the Henley Passport Index.

Where visa-free access is permitted, such access is not necessarily a right, and admission is at the discretion of border enforcement officers. Visitors engaging in activities other than tourism, including unpaid work, may require a visa or work permit.

It does not provide for where certain people under the assumption remained British Subjects without Citizenship, then later became British Overseas Citizens or British Subjects in 1983, there are different requirements. See Visa requirements for British Overseas citizens or South African nationality law.

== Visa requirements map ==
Visa requirements for South African citizens holding ordinary passports South Africa Visa not required Visa on arrival eVisa Visa available both on arrival or online Visa required

== Visa requirements ==
This list provides for the period of stay under "Allowed Stay" generally for short stay activities where a Visa is not required in sovereign states.

Country	Visa requirement	Allowed stay	Notes (excluding departure fees)	Reciprocity
Afghanistan	eVisa	30 days	e-Visa : Visitors must arrive at Kabul International (KBL).	No
Albania	eVisa	90 days	Holders of a valid, multiple entry and previously used visa issued by a Schengen area country, United States, or the United Kingdom can enter Albania without a visa for 90 days.	Yes
Algeria	Visa required		Persons may be denied entry if entering with a passport containing visas or stamps issued by Israel.; Visitors on tours organized to some southern regions by an approved travel agency may obtain a visa on arrival for up to 30 days.	—N/a
Andorra	Visa required		Andorra has no visa regime, but is only accessible through France and Spain. Multiple Entry Schengen Visa required.	—N/a
Angola	Visa not required	90 days		No
Antigua and Barbuda	Visa not required	6 months		Yes
Argentina	Visa not required	90 days		Yes
Armenia	eVisa / Visa on arrival	120 days		No
Australia and territories	Visa required		May apply online (Online Visitor e600 visa).; Transit visa is not required.; Biometric Collection is mandatory upon request for the Online Visitor e600 Visa.; Visas can be issued within a matter of seconds depending on the length of queue once all the appropriate information is provided including Biometrics.; Departing Passengers may use SmartGate for a faster entry into the passenger area, this is not applicable to arriving passengers for entry into Australia.	—N/a
Austria	Visa required			—N/a
Azerbaijan	eVisa	30 days	Holding a residence visa issued by the United Arab Emirates may obtain a 30-day tourist visa on arrival in Azerbaijan. They must present their valid visa or residence permit along with their passport	No
Bahamas	Visa not required	3 months		Yes
Bahrain	eVisa / Visa on arrival	14 days		No
Bangladesh	Visa required			—N/a
Barbados	Visa not required	6 months		Yes
Belarus	Visa required			—N/a
Belgium	Visa required			—N/a
Belize	Visa not required			Yes
Benin	Visa not required	90 days		Yes
Bhutan	eVisa	90 days	The Sustainable Development Fee (SDF) of 200 USD per person, per night for almost all visitors to Bhutan. Additionally, if payment is made in US dollars from September 1, 2023 to August 31, 2027, the SDF is 100 USD.	—N/a
Bolivia	Visa not required	90 days		Yes
Bosnia and Herzegovina	Visa required		Valid multiple entry visa holders and residents of the European Union, Schengen Area member states, and United States of America can enter Bosnia and Herzegovina without a visa for a maximum stay of 30 days.	—N/a
Botswana	Visa not required	90 days		Yes
Brazil	Visa not required	90 days		Yes
Brunei	Visa required			—N/a
Bulgaria	Visa required			—N/a
Burkina Faso	eVisa			—N/a
Burundi	Online Visa / Visa on arrival	1 month		—N/a
Cambodia	eVisa / Visa on arrival	30 days		No
Cameroon	eVisa			—N/a
Canada	Visa required		Temporary passports issued by the Republic of South Africa are not accepted by Canadian immigration officials.; Holders of the Right of Abode to the UK with a Certificate of Entitlement as proof of authenticity do not require a visa.	—N/a
Cape Verde	Visa on arrival(EASE)	30 days	Not available at all entry points.; Requirement to register online 5 days before arrival.; Also pay the airport security fee of CVE 3400 either online or on arrival.	Yes
Central African Republic	Visa required			—N/a
Chad	eVisa			—N/a
Chile	Visa not required	90 days		Yes
China	Visa required		24-hour visa-free transit through any international airports of China, allows domestic travel through different airports. (Note: Custom procedure for 24-hour visa-free transit is required in principle, except in Beijing (both Capital and Daxing), Shanghai Pudong, Hangzhou, Xiamen, Guangzhou, Shenzhen, Chengdu Tianfu and Xi'an if no leaving of international transit areas.); 5-day Shenzhen Visa on Arrival available at the Shenzhen border if travelling from Hong Kong or Macao. Visa holders must stay within the Shenzhen City and surrounds, not travel to other cities and leave at the end of the 5 day permission. Travelling to Guangzhou would be in violation of the conditions.	—N/a
Colombia	Online Visa		Transit visa is not required.	—N/a
Comoros	Visa on arrival	45 days		No
Republic of the Congo	Visa required			—N/a
Democratic Republic of the Congo	eVisa	7 days		—N/a
Costa Rica	Visa not required	90 days		Yes
Côte d'Ivoire	eVisa	3 months	e-Visa holders must arrive via Port Bouet Airport.	No
Croatia	Visa required			—N/a
Cuba	eVisa	90 days	Can be extended up to 90 days with a fee.	—N/a
Cyprus	Visa required		Holders of a visa or residence permit issued by a Schengen state or Monaco may also travel to Cyprus, without an additional visa, for a stay of up to 90 days in any 180-day period or until visa expiry date (whichever is shorter)	—N/a
Czech Republic	Visa required			—N/a
Denmark	Visa required			—N/a
Djibouti	eVisa	90 days		No
Dominica	Visa not required	6 months		No
Dominican Republic	Visa not required	90 days		No
Ecuador	Visa not required	90 days		Yes
Egypt	eVisa / Visa on arrival	30 days	Visa fee is 30 USD.	Yes
El Salvador	Visa not required	90 days		No
Equatorial Guinea	eVisa		Must arrive via Malabo International Airport, processing fee 75 USD	—N/a
Eritrea	Visa required			—N/a
Estonia	Visa required			—N/a
Eswatini	Visa not required	30 days		Yes
Ethiopia	eVisa / Visa on arrival	90 days	Visa on arrival is obtainable only at Addis Ababa Bole International Airport.; e-Visa holders must arrive via Addis Ababa Bole International Airport.; e-Visa is available for 30 or 90 days.	No
Fiji	Visa not required	4 months		No
Finland	Visa required			—N/a
France	Visa required			—N/a
Gabon	Visa not required	30 days.		Yes
Gambia	Visa not required	90 days	In addition to a visa, an entry clearance must be obtained from the Gambian Immigration prior to travel.	—N/a
Georgia	Visa not required	1 year	As of 1 January 2026 all visitors are required to present proof of health and accident insurance with a minimum cover of GEL30 000.	No
Germany	Visa required			—N/a
Ghana	Visa not required	90 days		Yes
Greece	Visa required			—N/a
Grenada	Visa not required	3 months		No
Guatemala	Visa not required	90 days		No
Guinea	eVisa	90 days		No
Guinea-Bissau	Visa on arrival	90 days		No
Guyana	Visa not required	3 months		Yes
Haiti	Visa not required	3 months		No
Honduras	Visa not required	90 days		No
Hungary	Visa required			—N/a
Iceland	Visa required			—N/a
India	eVisa	30 days	e-Visa holders must arrive via 32 designated airports (Note: Ahmedabad; Amritsar; Bagdogra; Bengaluru; Bhubaneswar; Chandigarh; Chennai; Coimbatore; Delhi; Gaya; Goa-Dabolim; Goa-Manohar; Guwahati; Hyderabad; Indore; Jaipur; Kannur; Kochi; Kolkata; Kozhikode; Lucknow; Madurai; Mangaluru; Mumbai; Nagpur; Port Blair; Pune; Surat; Thiruvananthapuram; Tiruchirappalli; Varanasi; Visakhapatnam) or 5 designated seaports. (Note: Chennai; Cochin; Mormugao (Goa); Mumbai; Mangalore); An Indian e-Tourist Visa may only be obtained twice within 1 calendar year.; Foreigners of Pakistani origin or who hold a Pakistani Passport are not eligible for an e-Visa. Foreigners who are not Pakistani nationals, but whose parents or grandparents (either paternal or maternal) were born in, or were permanent residents in Pakistan, are also not eligible for an e-Visa.	Yes
Indonesia	e-VOA / Visa on arrival	30 days		No
Iran	eVisa	30 days		Yes
Iraq	eVisa	30 days		—N/a
Ireland	Visa required			No
Israel	Electronic Travel Authorization	90 days		Yes
Italy	Visa required			—N/a
Jamaica	Visa not required			Yes
Japan	eVisa	90 days		No
Jordan	eVisa / Visa on arrival	30 days	Visa can be obtained upon arrival, it will cost a total of 40 JOD, obtainable at most international ports of entry and land border crossings. (except King Hussein/Allenby Bridge)	Yes
Kazakhstan	Visa not required		e-Visa can be issued only if there is a valid invitation from the Kazakhstan side.	—N/a
Kenya	Visa not required	90 days		Yes
Kiribati	Visa not required	90 days	90 days within any 12-month period.	—N/a
North Korea	Visa required			—N/a
South Korea	Electronic Travel Authorization	30 days	The validity period of a K-ETA is 3 years from the date of approval.	Yes
Kuwait	Visa required		Holders of residence permit's issued by Saudi Arabia, Bahrain, Qatar, Oman and the United Arab Emirates may apply for an eVisa if the main applicant works in a specific profession. Dependents holding residence permits may also obtain an eVisa, on the conditional they will enter Kuwait with the main applicant.	—N/a
Kyrgyzstan	eVisa / Visa on arrival	60 days / 30 days	Visa on arrival available at Manas International Airport.; e-Visa holders must arrive via Manas International Airport or Osh Airport or through land crossings with China (at Irkeshtam and Torugart), Kazakhstan (at Ak-jol, Ak-Tilek, Chaldybar, Chon-Kapka), Tajikistan (at Bor-Dobo, Kulundu, Kyzyl-Bel) and Uzbekistan (at Dostuk).	No
Laos	eVisa / Visa on arrival	30 days	18 (Note: Savannakhet Airport; Lanetoui - Mengkang (China); Meuangmom - Wan Pong (Myanmar); Banvang - Ban Khok Phai (Thailand); Namngeun - Huay Kon (Thailand); Paksan - Bueng Kan (Thailand); Paktaphan - Pak Saeng (Thailand); Pangmon - Ban Huak (Thailand); Phoudou (Thailand); Dak ta ock - Nam Giang (Vietnam); La Lai (Vietnam); Namkan (Vietnam); Namphao - Cau Treo (Vietnam); Namsoy - Na Meo (Vietnam); Naphao - Cha Lo (Vietnam); Pahang - Long Sap (Vietnam); Panghok - Tây Trang (Vietnam); Phoukeua - Bo Y (Vietnam)) of the 33 border crossings are only open to regular visa holders.; e-Visa may be used to enter Laos through the Luang Prabang, Pakse and Vientiane international airports, 3 Thai-Lao Friendship Bridges (Note: Vientiane (Friendship Bridge 1); Savannakhet (Friendship Bridge 2); Bokeo (Friendship Bridge 4)), in Boten (road and railroad), and in Vientiane (at Khamsavath railway station).; Visa on arrival is available at the Luang Prabang, Pakse and Vientiane international airports, 4 Thai-Lao Friendship Bridges (Note: Vientiane (Friendship Bridge 1); Savannakhet (Friendship Bridge 2); Khammouane (Friendship Bridge 3); Bokeo (Friendship Bridge 4)) and 7 border crossings. (Note: Nongnokkheane - Trapeang Kriel (Cambodia); Boten - Bo han (China); Golden Triangle/Samliemkham (Thailand); Khamsavath railway station (Thailand); Namheuang - Ban Na Kraseng (Thailand); Vang tao - Chongmek (Thailand); Dansavan - Lao Bảo (Vietnam))	No
Latvia	Visa required			—N/a
Lebanon	Visa required		In addition to a visa, an approval should be obtained from the Immigration department of the General Directorate of General Security (La Surete Generale).	—N/a
Lesotho	Visa not required	90 days		Yes
Liberia	Visa required			—N/a
Libya	eVisa			—N/a
Liechtenstein	Visa required			—N/a
Lithuania	Visa required		Certain travelers who are of Lithuanian Descent (i.e. by the parent, grandparent and great-grandparent) may be issued a long-stay Category D Visa or Permanent Residence valid if the relationship can be proved.	—N/a
Luxembourg	Visa required			—N/a
Madagascar	eVisa / Visa on arrival	90 days	For stays of 61 to 90 days, the visa fee is 59 USD.	Yes
Malawi	Visa not required	90 days		Yes
Malaysia	Visa not required	90 days		Yes
Maldives	Free visa on arrival	30 days		No
Mali	Visa required			—N/a
Malta	Visa required			—N/a
Marshall Islands	Visa on arrival	90 days		No
Mauritania	eVisa	30 days		No
Mauritius	Visa not required	180 days	180 days for tourism, 120 days for business.	Yes
Mexico	Visa required		Travellers who wish to visit Mexico (regardless of their nationality or itinerary), holding either a valid, multiple entry visa OR who are permanent residents of the United States, Canada, Japan, the United Kingdom or the EU Schengen Space countries, DO NOT require a Mexican tourist visa. Dependent upon the immigration officer, the maximum period of stay authorised is 180 days at a time.; Passport holders with less than six months validity may face difficulty when attempting to enter as a Business Visitor/ Tourist as they are usually permitted six months stay which might exceed the passport's validity.	No
Micronesia	Visa not required	30 days		No
Moldova	Visa required		South African nationals are allowed to visit Moldova without a Moldovan visa if they hold a valid residence permit or a valid multiple entry visa issued by a "Member State of the European Union or one of the States Parties to the Schengen Agreement, by the United Kingdom of Great Britain and Northern Ireland, the United States of America [or] Canada".	—N/a
Monaco	Visa required		Schengen Visa Required. Monaco is a de facto member of the Schengen Area and there are no formal immigration procedures upon exit and entry.	—N/a
Mongolia	eVisa	30 days		No
Montenegro	Visa required		Nationals of South Africa may visit Montenegro without a visa for up to 30 days if they hold a passport with visas issued by Ireland, a Schengen Area member state, the United Kingdom or the United States or if they are permanent residents of those countries. Residents of the United Arab Emirates do not require a visa for up to 10 days, if they hold a return ticket, fly directly in and out of Tivat Airport on FlyDubai and hold proof of accommodation.	—N/a
Morocco	Visa required		May apply for an e-Visa if holding a valid visa or a residency document issued by one of the following countries: Schengen Area, Australia, Canada, Ireland, New Zealand, United Kingdom, United States a residency document issued by Cyprus, Japan, United Arab Emirates.	—N/a
Mozambique	Visa not required	3 months		Yes
Myanmar	eVisa	28 days	e-Visa holders must arrive via Yangon, Nay Pyi Taw or Mandalay airports or via land border crossings with Thailand — Tachileik, Myawaddy and Kawthaung or India — Rih Khaw Dar and Tamu.; e-Visa available for both tourism or business purposes.	No
Namibia	Visa not required	3 months		Yes
Nauru	Visa required			—N/a
Nepal	Online Visa / Visa on arrival	90 days		No
Netherlands	Visa required			—N/a
New Zealand	Visa required		Holders of an Australian Permanent Resident Visa or Resident Return Visa may be granted a New Zealand Resident Visa on arrival permitting indefinite stay (pursuant to the Trans-Tasman Travel Arrangement), subject to meeting character requirements and obtaining an Electronic Travel Authority prior to departure.	—N/a
Nicaragua	Visa not required	90 days		No
Niger	Visa required			—N/a
Nigeria	eVisa	30 days		No
North Macedonia	Visa required		Holders of a valid multiple entry visa or Residence Permit for the Schengen Area may enter North Macedonia for up to 15 days visa free. A temporary residence permit of a Schengen member state is accepted since 27 February 2019.; Holders of a valid and physical UK, Canada or USA visa (inserted into the passport) may enter North Macedonia for up to 15 days visa free.; Electronic versions of multiple entry UK visas are not yet accepted as of March 2026.	—N/a
Norway	Visa required			—N/a
Oman	Visa not required / eVisa	14 days / 30 days		No
Pakistan	eVisa	3 months		Yes
Palau	Free visa on arrival	30 days		No
Panama	Visa not required	90 days		Yes
Papua New Guinea	eVisa	30 days		No
Paraguay	Visa not required	90 days		Yes
Peru	Visa not required	90 days		Yes
Philippines	Visa not required	30 days		Yes
Poland	Visa required			—N/a
Portugal	Visa required			—N/a
Qatar	Visa not required	30 days	Available at Hamad International Airport. The Visa Waiver Facility (of 30 days) cannot be facilitated if stay is less than 1 night, a Transit Visa should be applied for instead. Label is put in the passport in addition to a stamp upon arrival after satisfying the entry requirements.; e-Visa, Transit Visa from Qatar Airways (9–96 hours) and ETA are also available. eVisa refers to a Tourist Visa. These three methods are all acceptable alternatives for tourism should the South African passport holder wish not to use the Visa Waiver Facility available upon arrival.; Male travelers who are ordinarily a resident in Qatar require an Exit Visa/ Permit.	Yes
Romania	Visa required			—N/a
Russia	Visa not required	90 days	90 days within one calendar 1 year-period.	Yes
Rwanda	Visa not required	30 days		No
Saint Kitts and Nevis	Electronic Travel Authorisation	3 months		No
Saint Lucia	Visa not required	6 weeks		Yes
Saint Vincent and the Grenadines	Visa not required	3 months		Yes
Samoa	Entry Permit on arrival	90 days		No
San Marino	Visa required		San Marino has no visa regime, but is only accessible through Italy. Multiple Entry Schengen Visa required.	—N/a
São Tomé and Príncipe	eVisa			Yes
Saudi Arabia	eVisa / Visa on arrival	90 days		—N/a
Senegal	Visa on arrival	1 month		No
Serbia	eVisa	90 days	90 days within any 180-day period. Transfers allowed.; Visa-free for a maximum stay of 90 days for valid visa holders or residents of the European Union member states and the United States.	—N/a
Seychelles	Electronic Border System	3 months	Application can be submitted up to 30 days before travel.; Visitors must upload a reservation confirmation(s) for each visitor's location of stay in Seychelles.; Yellow fever vaccination certificate is required if coming from endemic countries.; Payment of the fee (EUR 10) by credit or debit card.; Valid for one journey only and it expires once exit the country.	Yes
Sierra Leone	eVisa / Visa on arrival	3 months / 30 days		No
Singapore	Visa not required	30 days		Yes
Slovakia	Visa required			—N/a
Slovenia	Visa required			—N/a
Solomon Islands	Visa required			—N/a
Somalia	eVisa	30 days	All visitors must have an approved Electronic Visa (eTAS) before the start of their journey.	No
South Sudan	eVisa		Obtainable online 30 days single entry for 100 USD, 90 days multiple entry for 200 USD and 180 days multiple entry for 350 USD.; Printed visa authorization must be presented at the time of travel.	No
Spain	Visa required			—N/a
Sri Lanka	ETA / Visa on arrival	30 days		No
Sudan	Visa required			—N/a
Suriname	eVisa			No
Sweden	Visa required			—N/a
Switzerland	Visa required			—N/a
Syria	eVisa			—N/a
Tajikistan	eVisa / visa on arrival	60 days / 45 days	e-Visa holders can enter through all border points.	No
Tanzania	Visa not required	90 days		Yes
Thailand	Visa not required	60 days	Extendable by 30 days at any Immigration Office within Thailand.	Yes
Timor-Leste	Visa on arrival	30 days		No
Togo	eVisa	15 days		No
Tonga	Visa required			—N/a
Trinidad and Tobago	Visa not required	90 days		Yes
Tunisia	Visa not required	3 months		Yes
Turkey	eVisa	30 days		Yes
Turkmenistan	Visa required		10-day visa on arrival if holding a letter of invitation provided by a company registered in Turkmenistan with a prior approval from the Foreign Ministry. Visitors can apply to extend their stay for an additional 10 days.; When transiting between two non-bordering countries, visitors can obtain a Turkmenistan transit visa for a five-day stay. This must be applied for in advance at the Turkmenistan Embassy. Visitors must also submit copies of the visas for the country of entry into Turkmenistan and the country of departure from Turkmenistan. Visa fee is 20 USD.	—N/a
Tuvalu	Visa on arrival	1 month		No
Uganda	eVisa	3 months		Yes
Ukraine	eVisa	30 days		No
United Arab Emirates	Visa required		May apply using 'Smart service'.; Visa not required in advance if in possession of the Right of Abode in the United Kingdom with a Certificate of Entitlement in Commonwealth passport, may enter the Emirate of Dubai in the same way as a British Citizen.	—N/a
United Kingdom and Crown dependencies	Visa required		Right of Abode holders with a Certificate of Entitlement in their Commonwealth passport may enter the United Kingdom and remain indefinitely.; Temporary Visa holders can only enter for 3 months if entering from the Republic of Ireland (Eire).; The Crown dependencies include the Bailiwicks of Jersey and Guernsey as well as the Isle of Man. The same Visa Policy applies mainly to the British Overseas Territory of Gibraltar, therefore a United Kingdom Visa can be used.; Transit Visa Required unless in possession of an exemption document; Australian, New Zealand and all other Visas with confirmation slips/ electronically granted Visas with a paper print-out as confirmation are not permitted as an exemption document unless endorsed by the airline. Note: Schengen Visa type "C" is not an approved exemption document. Entry must be refused or denied boarding on vessel. Direct Airside or Transit Visa required depending on type of transit.; Entering the United Kingdom (including Northern Ireland) by land, sea or air from the Republic of Ireland is not permitted unless in possession of a valid U.K. Visa or Immigration Document. UK Land or Transit Visa cannot be used to transit the UK from Ireland or from Ireland to the UK, a Standard Visa is required.	—N/a
United States	Visa required		Holders of a B1 / B2 (B) Visa, Permanent Resident Card, D Visa who have entered the United States at least once since 2008 may use the Automated Passport Control (APC) Kiosk for faster processing at selected airports, before proceeding to a US Customs and Border Protection officer for finalization of entry into the United States.; Available locations include some United States border preclearance facilities as well.	—N/a
Uruguay	Visa not required	90 days		Yes
Uzbekistan	Visa required		5-day visa-free transit at the international airports if holding a confirmed onward ticket for a flight to a third country.	—N/a
Vanuatu	Visa not required	120 days		No
Vatican City	Visa required		Schengen Visa Required. Entry can be made from Italy exclusively. Vatican City is a de facto member of the Schengen Area and there are no formal immigration procedures upon entry and exit.	—N/a
Venezuela	Visa not required	90 days		Yes
Vietnam	eVisa		e-Visa is valid for 90 days and multiple entry.; 30 days visa free when visit Phu Quoc Island.	—N/a
Yemen	Visa required		Yemen introduced an e-Visa system for visitors who meet certain eligibility requirements (group travel of 10 or more people, business trips, and transit etc.).	—N/a
Zambia	Visa not required	90 days		Yes
Zimbabwe	Visa not required	3 months		Yes

== Dependent, disputed, or restricted territories ==
=== Unrecognised or partially recognised countries ===
Territory	Conditions of access	Notes
Abkhazia	Visa required	Tourists from all countries (except Georgia) can visit Abkhazia for a period not exceeding 24 hours as part of an organized tourist group.
Kosovo	Visa not required	90 days
Northern Cyprus	Visa not required	3 months
Palestine	Visa not required	Arrival by sea to Gaza Strip not allowed.
Sahrawi Arab Democratic Republic	Visa regime undefine	Undefined visa regime in the Western Sahara controlled territory.
Somaliland	Visa on arrival	30 days for 30 USD, payable on arrival.
South Ossetia	Visa not required	To enter South Ossetia, visitors must have a multiple-entry visa for Russia and register their stay with the Migration Service of the Ministry of Internal Affairs within 3 days.
Taiwan	Visa required	
Transnistria	Visa not required	Registration required after 24h.

=== Dependent and autonomous territories ===
Territory	Conditions of access	Notes
China
Hong Kong	Visa not required	30 days. Landing slip with stay conditions issued upon arrival in place of entry stamp. This is not a permit, however it is used to classify South African citizens as being visa exempted.
Macau	Visa not required	30 days
Denmark
Faroe Islands	Visa required	
Greenland	Visa required	
France
French Guiana	Visa required	
French Polynesia	Visa required	
(France) French West Indies	Visa required	Includes overseas departments of Guadeloupe and Martinique and overseas collectivities of Saint Barthélemy and Saint Martin.
Mayotte	Visa required	
New Caledonia	Visa required	
Réunion	Visa not required	3 months. Travel to mainland France is prohibited unless in possession of a Valid Schengen Visa, Identity and Visa checks are conducted between Reunion and mainland France/ EU or EEA countries and Switzerland.
Saint Pierre and Miquelon	Visa required	
Wallis and Futuna	Visa required	
Netherlands
Aruba	Visa required	
Caribbean Netherlands	Visa required	Includes Bonaire, Sint Eustatius and Saba.
Curaçao	Visa required	
Sint Maarten	Visa required	
New Zealand
Cook Islands	Visa not required	31 days
Niue	Visa not required	30 days
Tokelau	Visa required	
United Kingdom
Akrotiri and Dhekelia	Visa required	
Anguilla	eVisa	Visitors do NOT need to apply for a visa if: You have a valid visa to enter the UK, US or Canada. A valid UK, US or Canada visa can be used to enter Anguilla.
Bermuda	Visa required	Visa not required for holders of Canadian, US or UK multiple-entry visa valid for at least 45 days beyond the period of intended stay in Bermuda for a maximum stay of 3 months
British Indian Ocean Territory	Special permit required	Special permit required.
British Virgin Islands	Visa not required	30 days, extensions possible
Cayman Islands	Visa not required	6 months
Falkland Islands	Visa required	
Gibraltar	Visa required	Gibraltar is the only British Overseas Territory which falls under the UK's Visa Policy. UK Visa Required for Entry.
Montserrat	Visa not required	6 months
Pitcairn Islands	Visa not required	14 days visa free and landing fee US$35 or tax of US$5 if not going ashore.
Ascension Island	eVisa	3 months within any 1 year-period.
Saint Helena	Visa Free with Payment	
Tristan da Cunha	Permission required	Permission to land required for 15/30 pounds sterling (yacht/ship passenger) for Tristan da Cunha Island or 20 pounds sterling for Gough Island, Inaccessible Island or Nightingale Islands.
South Georgia and the South Sandwich Islands	Permit required	Pre-arrival permit from the Commissioner required (72 hours/1 month for 110/160 pounds sterling).
Turks and Caicos Islands	Visa not required	90 days
United States
American Samoa	Visa required	
Guam	Visa required	
Northern Mariana Islands	Visa required	
Puerto Rico	Visa required	US visa is required to visit Puerto Rico
U.S. Virgin Islands	Visa required	
Antarctica and adjacent islands
Special permits required for Bouvet Island, British Antarctic Territory, French Southern and Antarctic Lands, Argentine Antarctica, (Australia) Australian Antarctic Territory, (Antártica Chilena Province) Chilean Antarctic Territory, (Australia) Heard Island and McDonald Islands, (Norway) Peter I Island, (Norway) Queen Maud Land, (New Zealand) Ross Dependency.

=== Other territories ===
Territory	Conditions of access	Notes
Belarus; Belovezhskaya Pushcha National Park	Visa not required	3 days; must first obtain an electronic pass
China; Hainan	Visa required	
China; Tibet Autonomous Region	TTP required	Tibet Travel Permit required (10 USD).
(Autonomous Republic of Crimea) Crimea	Visa required	Visa issued by Russia is required.
Ecuador; Galápagos	Pre-registration required	60 days; Visitors must pre-register to receive a 20 USD Transit Control Card (TCT).
Eritrea outside Asmara	Travel permit required	To travel in the rest of the country, a Travel Permit for Foreigners is required (20 Eritrean nakfa).
Greece; Mount Athos	Special permit required	Special permit required (4 days: 25 euro for Orthodox visitors, 35 euro for non-Orthodox visitors, 18 euro for students). There is a visitors' quota: maximum 100 Orthodox and 10 non-Orthodox per day and women are not allowed.
India PAP/RAP	PAP/RAP required	Protected Area Permit (PAP) required for whole states of Nagaland and Sikkim and parts of states Manipur, Arunachal Pradesh, Uttaranchal, Jammu and Kashmir, Rajasthan, Himachal Pradesh. Restricted Area Permit (RAP) required for all of Andaman and Nicobar Islands and parts of Sikkim. Some of these requirements are occasionally lifted for a year.
Iran; Kish Island	Visa not required	Visitors to Kish Island do not require a visa.
Iraqi Kurdistan	Visa required	
Fiji; Lau Province	Special permission required	Special permission required.
France; Clipperton Island	Special permit required	Special permit required.
Kazakhstan	Special permission required	Special permission required for the town of Baikonur and surrounding areas in Kyzylorda Oblast, and the town of Gvardeyskiy near Almaty.
North Korea outside Pyongyang	Special permit required	People are not allowed to leave the capital city, tourists can only leave the capital with a governmental tourist guide (no independent moving).
MalaysiaSabah and Sarawak	Visa not required	These states have their own immigration authorities and passport is required to travel to them, however the same visa applies.
Maldives outside Malé	Permission required	With the exception of the capital Malé, tourists are generally prohibited from visiting non-resort islands without the express permission of the Government of Maldives.
Norway; Jan Mayen	Permit required	Permit issued by the local police required for staying for less than 24 hours and permit issued by the Norwegian police for staying for more than 24 hours.
Norway Svalbard	Visa not required	Unlimited Stay.; Transit Visa not required when transiting Oslo, Norway to get to Svalbard Airport, Longyear,Svalbard.
Novorossiya	Restricted area	Crossing from Ukraine requires visit purpose to be explained to Ukrainian passport control on exit and those who entered from Russia are not allowed to proceed further into Ukraine.
Russia	Special authorization required	Several closed cities and regions in Russia require special authorization.
Sudan outside Khartoum	Travel permit required	All foreigners traveling more than 25 kilometers outside of Khartoum must obtain a travel permit.
Sudan; Darfur	Travel permit required	Separate travel permit is required.
Tajikistan; Gorno-Badakhshan Autonomous Province	OIVR permit required	OIVR permit required (15+5 Tajikistani Somoni) and another special permit (free of charge) is required for Lake Sarez.
(United Nations) UN Buffer Zone in Cyprus	Access Permit required	Access Permit is required for travelling inside the zone, except Civil Use Areas.
(United Nations) Korean Demilitarized Zone	Restricted zone.	
(United Nations) UNDOF Zone and Ghajar	Restricted zone.	
United States Minor Outlying Islands	Special permits required	Special permits required for Baker Island, Howland Island, Jarvis Island, Johnston Atoll, Kingman Reef, Midway Atoll, Palmyra Atoll and Wake Island.
Venezuela; Margarita Island	Visa not required	All visitors are fingerprinted.
Vietnam; Phú Quốc	Visa not required	30 days
Yemen outside Sanaa or Aden	Special permission required	Special permission needed for travel outside Sanaa or Aden.

== Changes in Visa Requirements for South African Citizens ==
List of Changes

Visa Requirements Abolished/ Imposed (agreement conferred)	Abolished	Imposed	Date of Effect	Reciprocity (at time of agreement and subsequent implementation)
Canada		Yes	1969-1972	No
Switzerland (12 Dec 2008)		Yes	12 Dec 2008	No
United Kingdom (July 2009)		Yes	July 2009	No
Colombia (September 2016)		Yes		Yes
New Zealand (November 2016)		Yes	21 November 2016	No
Russia (April 2017)	Yes		1 April 2017	Yes
Qatar (June–August 2017)	Yes			Yes
Angola (November 2017)	Yes		1 December 2017	Yes
Egypt (November 2019)	Simplified (E-visa)		November 2019	No
Ireland (Republic of)		Yes	July 2024	No

== Visa exemptions ==
In some instances, a Visa Exemption permits entry in lieu of obtaining a Visa/ Entry Visa if in possession of the following Visas or Permanent Relationships, this is not limited to entitlements or provisions laid down by the country's law, for instance, right to enter without prior authority due to background such as in the case of former Indian Citizens:

This list does not include the ability of a Visa Document Exemption/ Substitute for a Visa Application, for instance a US Visa as an exemption document for the issue of a Qatari e-Visa.

=== Summary of Visa Exemptions ===
Country of Issue where document can be used as an Exemption for entry	for entry to	Visa or Residence Permit	Notes
United States	Albania Bosnia and Herzegovina Bermuda of the United Kingdom Mexico Montenegro North Macedonia São Tomé and Príncipe Serbia	Both	
Canada	Bermuda of the United Kingdom Mexico	Both	
United Kingdom	Canada # New Zealand # United Arab Emirates # United Kingdom: +Indefinitely # Bermuda of the United Kingdom #	# Holders of the Right of Abode	
United Kingdom	Bermuda of the United Kingdom	Both Indefinite and Temporary Visas	
Australia	New Zealand	Australian Permanent Residence	

=== List of Visa Exemptions ===
North America

United States of America - South African Citizens in possession of a valid United States Multiple Entry Visa in their passport may enter the following country(ies) visa-free for the time indicated beside, this also includes the countries consisting of the former Yugoslavia:

- Albania - 90 days
- Bosnia and Herzegovina - 30 days
- Bermuda of the United Kingdom - 3 months (if arriving or transiting from the United States)
- Mexico - 180 days, see note in Mexico under "Visa Requirements";
- Montenegro - 30 days
- North Macedonia - 15 days
- São Tomé and Príncipe - 15 days
- Serbia - 90 days

Canada - South African Citizens in possession of a valid Canadian Multiple Entry Visa in their passport may enter the following country(ies) visa-free for the time indicated adjacent:

- Bermuda of the United Kingdom - 3 months (if transiting or arriving from Canada)
- Mexico - 180 days

British Isles

United Kingdom and the Republic of Ireland.

Right of Abode in the United Kingdom of Great Britain and Northern Ireland - South African Citizens who are in possession of a Valid Certificate of Entitlement substantiating their claim to the Right of Abode in the United Kingdom in their South African passport (as either a British National or South African / Commonwealth Citizen) may enter the following Commonwealth Realms / countries for the same period for as a South African Citizen who would usually a Visa but without the Right of Abode in the United Kingdom (+except the United Kingdom as right to reside is automatic):

- Canada - 6 months
- United Arab Emirates
- United Kingdom - Indefinitely

South African citizens in possession of Leave to Remain or Enter holders(whether permanent or temporary) / Ireland Biometric Visa or Permanent Residency holders:

Holder's of a United Kingdom Visa May enter:

Bermuda of the United Kingdom - 3 months (if arriving or transiting from the United Kingdom).

Australia

Permanent Residence in the Commonwealth of Australia - South African Citizens with any type of a Valid Australian Permanent Resident Visa electronically granted or as a label still valid may enter the following country:

- New Zealand - Indefinite. Note: may apply for Permanent Residency in New Zealand after satisfying two years residence with an Australian Resident Visa in New Zealand. Australian Resident Visa is a New Zealand (Indefinite) Visa which is granted at the New Zealand border to Australian Permanent Residents in the form of an entry stamp, if the holder leaves New Zealand the Visa would therefore end and the time spent would not count towards satisfying the Two Year Residence requirement in order to become a New Zealand Permanent Resident (2 years) or a Citizen (5 years). Australian Resident Visa is the name of the Visa given to Australian Permanent Residents or Australian Citizens upon arrival in New Zealand.

Holder's must also consider that they will be able to return to Australia as a Permanent Resident should the expiry of their travel facility on their Australian Permanent Residence occur whilst they are in New Zealand. The Australian Resident Visa granted in New Zealand is indefinite if in New Zealand, however expires when leaving.

As of 1 October 2019, Australian Permanent Residents need to apply for a New Zealand Electronic Travel Authority (NZeTA) if they wish to enter New Zealand. The ETA is valid for 2 years however there is no time limit on the length of stay, this is just the time the holder must enter within. The cost is NZD 9 on the mobile app and NZD 12 on the internet per traveller and takes about 5 minutes to complete. The aim is to preauthorise travel to New Zealand. Once the Australian Permanent Resident arrives, they will be granted a New Zealand Visa for Australian Residents (Australian Resident Visa) subject to satisfying character requirements. It is very important to consider three things: Validity of Australian Permanent Residence in order to return to Australia or New Zealand, Validity of NZeTA and leaving New Zealand. Leaving New Zealand will terminate the New Zealand Visa for Australian Resident, if the Australian Permanent Resident Visa is not Valid then they will not be able to return to New Zealand or Australia. There are no other costs involved. Australian Resident Visa

European Union

European Union Family Member - South African Citizens who are travelling with or joining their EU family members in the European Union in a Country other than where their family member is a citizen of does not require a Visa to enter and enjoy the same entry rights and stay, however this would be difficult to prove and as a result, entry could be refused. Visa should be applied for in advance which is usually with no or minimal requirements to meet if the applicant is a family member of an EU Citizen. For instance, a person who wants to travel with their spouse to France where their spouse is a Citizen of the Republic of Lithuania should apply for a Schengen Visa in advance or where a person wants to join their Lithuanian spouse who resides in France should also apply for a Schengen Visa in order to prove their right and avoid misconception. In most cases, airlines will not permit travel without a visa. There is no time limit a family member can stay (indefinite stay), they must just enter before the Visa expires if joining their family or travelling at the same time. There are no costs involved either. European Union citizens and their South African family members will need to apply for settled or pre-settled status if they wish continue residing in the UK after 31 December 2020. Settled Status can be granted when the applicant has resided in the UK for 5 years and is valid indefinitely. In order to maintain settled status, people must visit the UK every 5 years. Pre-Settled status is granted when the applicant has resided in the UK for less than 5 years and is valid for 5 years. In order to maintain pre-settled status, people must visit the UK every two years. However, applicants would have to meet continuous residence until they reach 5 years if they want to qualify for settled status after 31 December 2020. It will not be possible to be granted another pre-settled Visa.

Schengen Visa (Long Stay) - Holder's of a Valid Long Stay Category D Visa who arrive in the Schengen European country of their Visa and apply for a Residence Card shortly after arriving will be able to use their EU residence permit/ card for travel within the Schengen States, if granted.

== Non-visa restrictions ==
=== Blank passport pages ===
Many countries require a minimum number of blank pages to be available in the passport being presented, typically one or two pages. Endorsement pages, which often appear after the visa pages, are not counted as being valid or available.

=== Vaccination ===
Cover of the new International Certificate of Vaccination issued by the Bureau of Quarantine in the Philippines since 2021

The African countries of Angola, Benin, Burkina Faso, Burundi, Cameroon, Central African Republic, Democratic Republic of the Congo, Republic of the Congo, Côte d'Ivoire, Gabon, Ghana, Guinea-Bissau, Mali, Niger, Sierra Leone and Togo, South Sudan and Uganda, along with French Guiana in South America, require all incoming passengers older than nine months to one year, to have a current International Certificate of Vaccination or Prophylaxis.

Some other countries require vaccination only if the passenger is coming from an infected area or has visited one recently or has transited for 12 hours in those countries: Algeria, Botswana, Cabo Verde, Chad, Djibouti, Egypt, Eswatini, Ethiopia, Gambia, Ghana, Guinea, Lesotho, Libya, Equatorial Guinea, Eritrea, Madagascar, Malawi, Mauritania, Mauritius, Mozambique, Namibia, Nigeria, Papua New Guinea, Seychelles, Somalia, South Africa, Sudan, Tunisia, Uganda, Tanzania, Zambia and Zimbabwe.

=== Passport validity length ===
Very few countries, such as Paraguay, just require a valid passport on arrival.

However many countries and groupings now require only an identity card – especially from their neighbours. Other countries may have special bilateral arrangements that depart from the generality of their passport validity length policies to shorten the period of passport validity required for each other's citizens or even accept passports that have already expired (but not been cancelled).

Some countries, such as Japan, Ireland and the United Kingdom, require a passport valid throughout the period of the intended stay.

In the absence of specific bilateral agreements, countries requiring passports to be valid for at least 6 more months on arrival include Afghanistan, Algeria, Anguilla, Bahrain, Bhutan, Botswana, British Virgin Islands, Brunei, Cambodia, Cameroon, Cape Verde, Cayman Islands, Central African Republic, Chad, Comoros, Costa Rica, Côte d'Ivoire, Curaçao, Ecuador, Egypt, El Salvador, Equatorial Guinea, Fiji, Gabon, Guinea Bissau, Guyana, Haiti, India, Indonesia, Iran, Iraq, Israel, Jordan, Kenya, Kiribati, Kuwait, Laos, Madagascar, Malaysia, Marshall Islands, Mongolia, Myanmar, Namibia, Nepal, Nicaragua, Nigeria, Oman, Palau, Papua New Guinea, Peru, Philippines, Qatar, Rwanda, Samoa, Saudi Arabia, Singapore, Solomon Islands, Somalia, Sri Lanka, Sudan, Suriname, Tanzania, Thailand, Timor-Leste, Tokelau, Tonga, Turkey, Tuvalu, Uganda, United Arab Emirates, Vanuatu, Venezuela, and Vietnam.

Countries requiring passports valid for at least 4 months on arrival include Micronesia and Zambia.

Countries requiring passports with a validity of at least 3 months beyond the date of intended departure include Azerbaijan, Bosnia and Herzegovina, Honduras, Montenegro, Nauru, Moldova and New Zealand. Similarly, the EEA countries of Iceland, Liechtenstein, Norway, all European Union countries (except Ireland) together with Switzerland also require 3 months validity beyond the date of the bearer's intended departure unless the bearer is an EEA or Swiss national.

Countries requiring passports valid for at least 3 months on arrival include Albania, North Macedonia, Panama, and Senegal.

Bermuda requires passports to be valid for at least 45 days upon entry.

Countries that require a passport validity of at least one month beyond the date of intended departure include Eritrea, Hong Kong, Lebanon, Macau, the Maldives and South Africa.

==== Maximum passport age ====
Countries of the Schengen area require non-EU passports to be less than 10 years old upon entry.

=== Criminal record ===
Some countries, including Australia, Canada, Fiji, New Zealand and the United States, routinely deny entry to non-citizens who have a criminal record, while others impose restrictions depending on the type of conviction and the length of the sentence.

=== Persona non grata ===
The government of a country can declare a diplomat persona non grata, banning them from entering the country or expelling them if they have already entered. In non-diplomatic use, the authorities of a country may also declare a foreigner persona non grata permanently or temporarily, usually because of unlawful activity.

=== Israeli stamps ===
Kuwait, Lebanon, Libya, and Yemen do not allow entry to people with passport stamps from Israel or whose passports have either a used or an unused Israeli visa, or where there is evidence of previous travel to Israel such as entry or exit stamps from neighbouring border posts in transit countries such as Jordan and Egypt.

To circumvent this Arab League boycott of Israel, the Israeli immigration services have now mostly ceased to stamp foreign nationals' passports on either entry to or exit from Israel (unless the entry is for some work-related purposes). Since 15 January 2013, Israel no longer stamps foreign passports at Ben Gurion Airport. Passports are still (as of 22 June 2017) stamped at Erez when passing into and out of Gaza.

Iran refuses admission to holders of passports containing an Israeli visa or stamp that is less than 12 months old.

=== Biometrics ===
Several countries mandate that all travellers, or all foreign travellers, be fingerprinted on arrival and will refuse admission to or even arrest travellers who refuse to comply. In some countries, such as the United States, this may apply even to transit passengers who merely wish to change planes rather than go landside.

Fingerprinting countries/regions include Afghanistan, Argentina, Brunei, Cambodia, China, Ethiopia, Ghana, Guinea, India, Japan, Kenya (both fingerprints and a photo are taken), Malaysia upon entry and departure, Mongolia, Saudi Arabia, the Schengen Area, Singapore, South Korea, Taiwan, Thailand, Uganda, the United Arab Emirates and the United States.

Many countries also require a photo be taken of people entering the country. The United States, which does not fully implement exit control formalities at its land frontiers (although long mandated by its own legislation), intends to implement facial recognition for passengers departing from international airports to identify people who overstay their visa.

Together with fingerprint and face recognition, iris scanning is one of three biometric identification technologies internationally standardised since 2006 by the International Civil Aviation Organization (ICAO) for use in e-passports and the United Arab Emirates conducts iris scanning on visitors who need to apply for a visa. The United States Department of Homeland Security has announced plans to greatly increase the biometric data it collects at US borders. In 2018, Singapore began trials of iris scanning at three land and maritime immigration checkpoints.

== Consular protection of South African citizens abroad ==
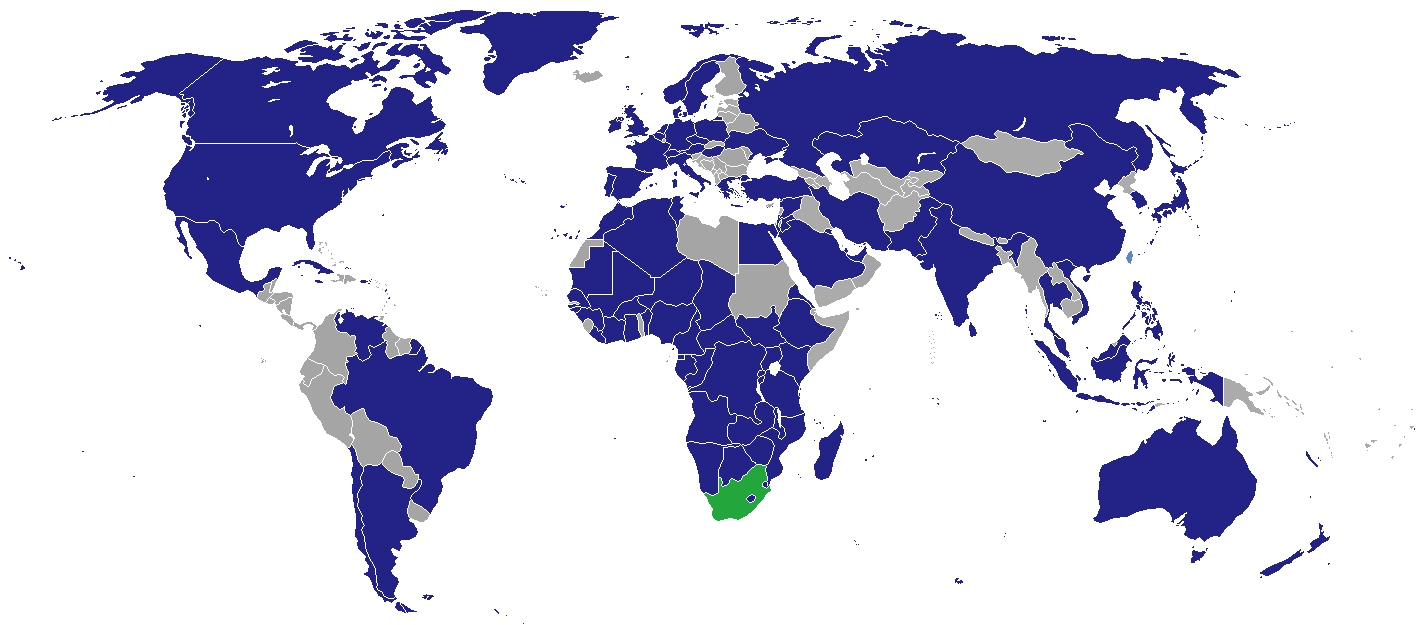
Diplomatic missions of South Africa

== See also ==
- Visa policy of South Africa
