= South African passport =

Passport of the Republic of South Africa issued to South African citizens

South African passport 10 other official names: Suid-Afrikaanse paspoort (Afrikaans); iphasiphothi yaseNingizimu Afrika (Zulu); incwadana yokundwendwela yaseMzantsi Afrika (Xhosa); pasporoto ya Afrika Borwa (Northern Sotho); phaseporoto ya Aforika Borwa (Tswana); phasepoto ya Afrika Borwa (Sotho); phasipoto ya Afrika Dzonga (Tsonga); iphasipoti yaseNingizimu Afrika (Swazi); phasipoto ya Afrika Tshipembe (Venda); ipasipoti yeSewula Afrika (Southern Ndebele)
- Front cover of a current-issue South African passport.
- Type: Passport
- Issued by: Department of Home Affairs
- First issued: 1 April 2009 (current version)
- Purpose: Traveling
- Eligibility: South African citizenship
- Expiration: 10 years after acquisition for adults, 5 years for children
- Cost: R600 (32page) / R1200 (48page)

A South African passport (also colloquially referred to as the 'Green Mamba' or the 'Biltong Book' by South Africans) is a travel document issued to citizens of South Africa for the purpose of international travel. It allows the bearer to travel in foreign countries in accordance with visa requirements, and facilitates the process of securing assistance from South African consular officials abroad, if necessary. A South African passport is a valid proof of citizenship document according to South African nationality law. As of June 2026, citizens of South Africa enjoyed visa-free access to 101 countries, of which some countries may require pre-travel registration according to the Henley Passport Index.

South African passports are issued by the South African Department of Home Affairs, in terms of the South African Passport and Travel Documents Act (Act 4 of 1994), and the South African Passport and Travel Documents Regulations of 1996.

== Types of passports ==
There are six types of South African passports:

Regular passport
These passports are issued to citizens who are 16 years of age or older, and are intended for occasional travel, such as vacations and business trips. They contain 32 pages, and are valid for 10 years. Regular passports are not renewable – when they expire, new passport applications have to be filed.

Maxi passport
Similar to regular passports, but they contain 48 pages to cater for frequent travellers. Like regular passports, they are issued to citizens aged 16 and older, are valid for 10 years, and are non-renewable. Like the regular passport, when a maxi passport expires, a new passport application must be filed.

Child passport
These passports are issued to citizens who are 15 years of age or younger. They are valid for five years, and are non-renewable

Official passport
These passports are issued to officials attached to government institutions who have to travel on official business. They are valid for five years, and are issued to officials free of charge by the Department of Home Affairs.

Diplomatic passport
Issued to diplomats and consuls for work-related travel, and to their accompanying dependants.

== Physical appearance ==
South African passports are green in colour, with the South African coat of arms emblazoned in gold in the centre of the front cover. "REPUBLIC OF SOUTH AFRICA", French: "RÉPUBLIQUE D'AFRIQUE DU SUD" are inscribed in gold text above and below the coat of arms respectively. "PASSPORT", French: "PASSEPORT" are inscribed in gold text near the bottom of the front cover. The back cover is left blank.

Beginning in 2009, passports were issued with the new post-2000 South African coat of arms. Additionally, visa pages now contain pictures of the Lion, Buffalo, Leopard, Elephant, and Rhinoceros – the Big Five animals of Southern Africa.

The passport note occupies the first page of the passport, and the particulars page occupies the last. The identity information page is printed on the inside of the passport's back cover, opposite the particulars page.

=== Languages ===
The front cover, passport note, particulars page, and identity information page are printed in both English and French. Until 1994, they were also printed in Afrikaans.

=== Passport note ===
Passports contain a note from the issuing state, addressed to the authorities of all other states, identifying the bearer as a citizen of that state and requesting that they be allowed to pass and be treated according to international norms. The note inside the South African passport states:

In English:

In the Name of the President
The President of the Republic of South Africa requests all whom it may concern to allow the bearer of this passport to pass freely without let or hindrance and to afford the bearer all necessary assistance and protection.

and in French:

Au Nom du Président
Le Président de la République d'Afrique du Sud, prie tous ceux que les présentes peuvent concerner de laisser passer librement et sans entrave le titulaire du présent passeport et de lui accorder toute aide et secours en cas de besoin.

=== Particulars page ===
On the particulars page, the bearer is instructed to fill in their address of permanent residence and other contact information, and the name, address, and contact information of someone to notify in case of accident or death abroad.

=== Identity information page ===
The following data are printed on the identity information page, located on the inside of the passport's back cover:

- Photograph of passport holder
- Type [of document]
- Code [of the issuing country, which is ZAF for South Africa]
- Passport number
- Surname
- Given name(s)
- Nationality
- Date of birth
- Identity number
- Sex
- Place of birth [lists only the country name]
- Date of issue
- Authority [the issuing authority of the passport, which is Dept of Home Affairs]
- Date of expiry
- Holder's signature (if aged 16 or older)

A machine-readable zone is found at the bottom of the identity information page.

=== New passports (with the new post-2000 coat of arms) ===
The Department of Home Affairs began issuing new format passports on 9 April 2009. These passports are not biometric but do contain sophisticated security features such as a seven-layer polycarbonate page where personal details and a photograph are laser engraved. Various other security features have been used to bring the passport into line with International Civil Aviation Organization requirements.

== Visa-free travel ==
Visa requirements for South African citizens South Africa Visa free access Visa on arrival eVisa Visa on arrival or online Visa required

Visa requirements for South African citizens are administrative entry restrictions by the authorities of other states placed on citizens of South Africa. As of 2024, South African citizens had visa-free or visa on arrival access to 106 countries and territories, ranking the South African passport 47th in the world according to the Henley Passport Index.

== Applying and carrying ==
Until more modern and digital methods were introduced, to apply for a South African passport, one had to fill in application form BI-73, and bring the appropriate-sized photographs to ensure correct identity. Nowadays, photographs are captured onsite, as well as other biometrics.

South African passports are issued at any home affairs office in South Africa but all are printed in the executive capital, Pretoria.

According to the South African Citizenship Act (Act 88 of 1995) as amended by the South African Citizenship Amendment Act (Act 17 of 2004), South Africans may hold dual citizenship, but may not use their citizenship of another country to gain advantage or avoid responsibility while in South Africa.

It is also illegal for an adult who holds South African citizenship to enter or depart South Africa using a non-South African passport. Dual nationals using a non-South African passport to enter/exit South Africa may be turned away from border checkpoints and could be fined or imprisoned for up to 12 months. However, the use of their non-South African passport is permitted to enter/exit any country other than South Africa.

== Gallery of historic images ==
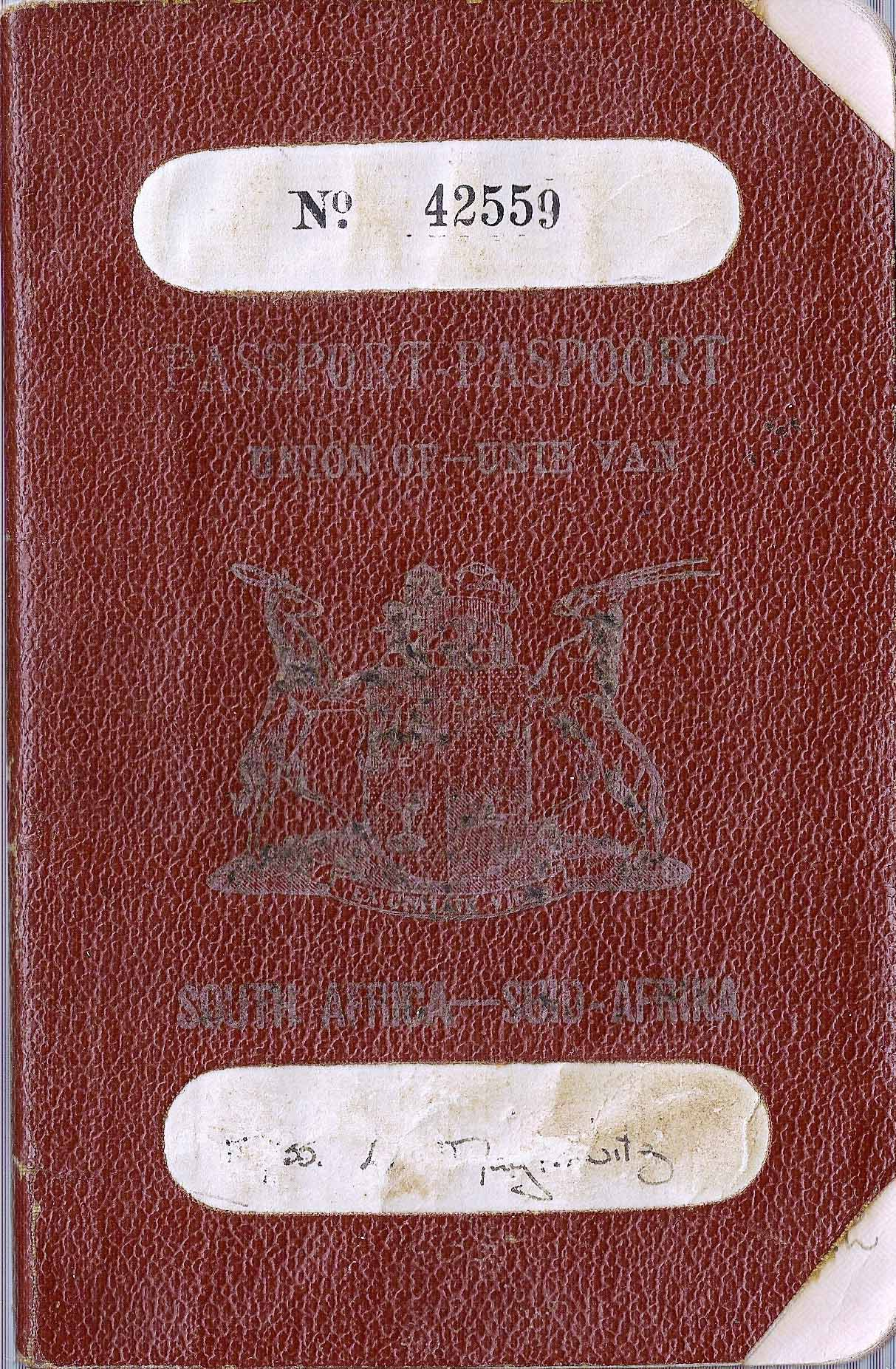
1944 South African passport

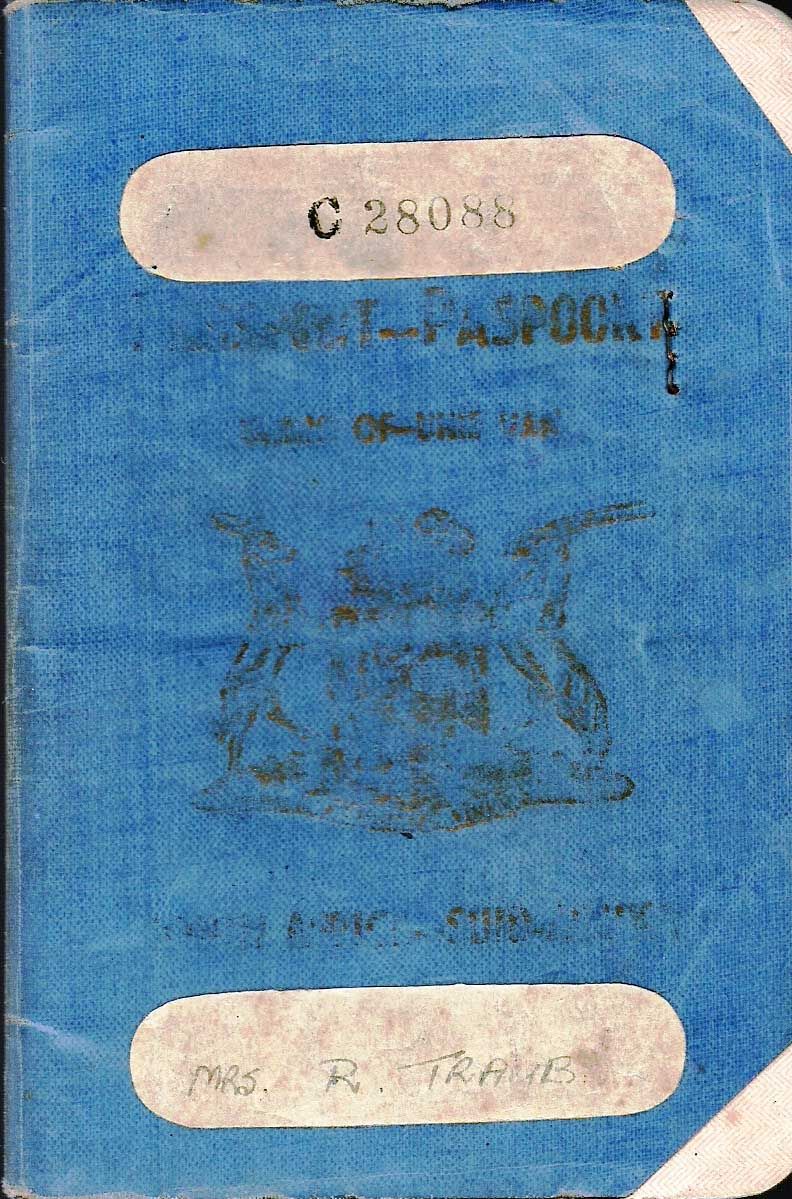
1948 South African passport

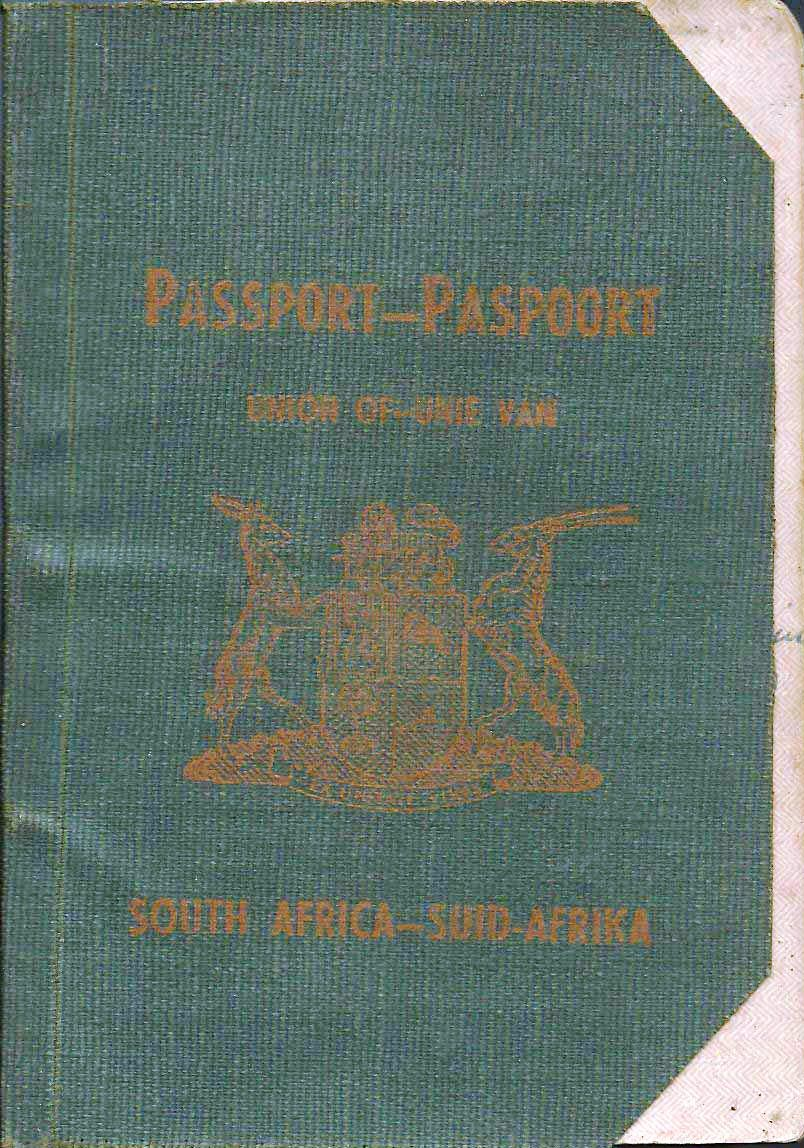
1951 South African passport

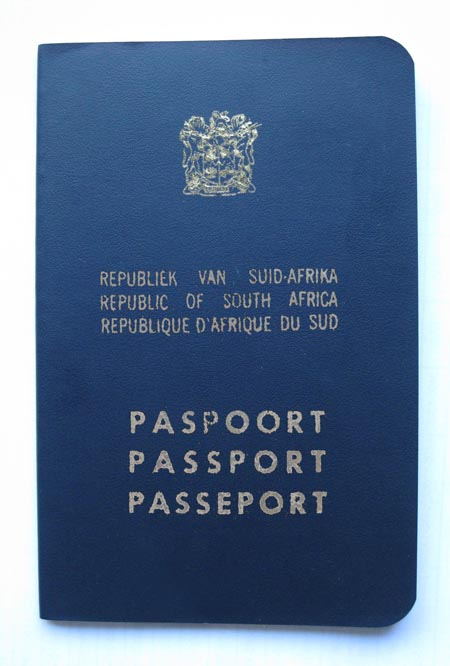
Front cover of a South African passport, issued pre-1994.

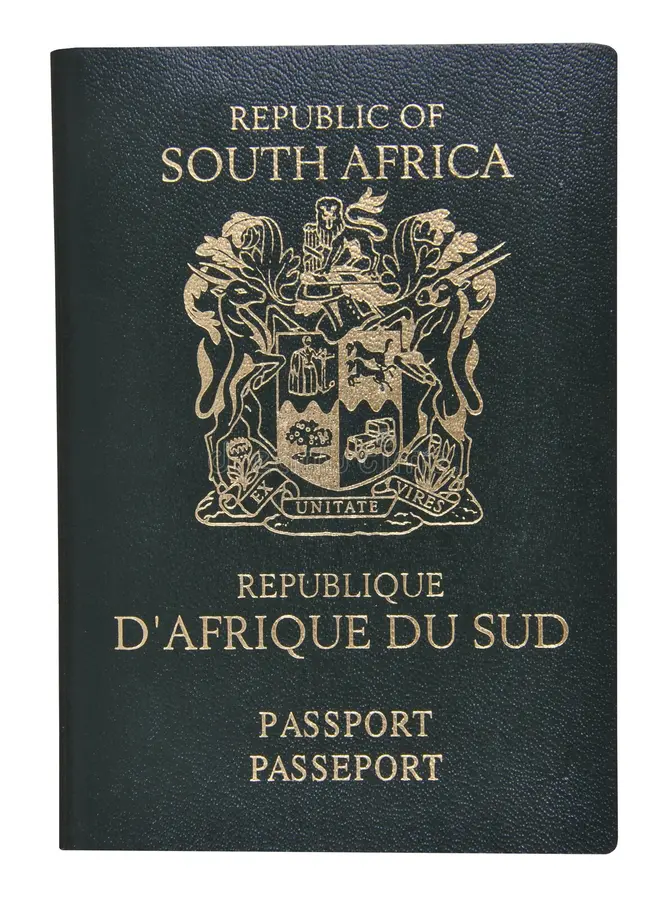
Front cover of a South African passport, issued between 1994 and 2009

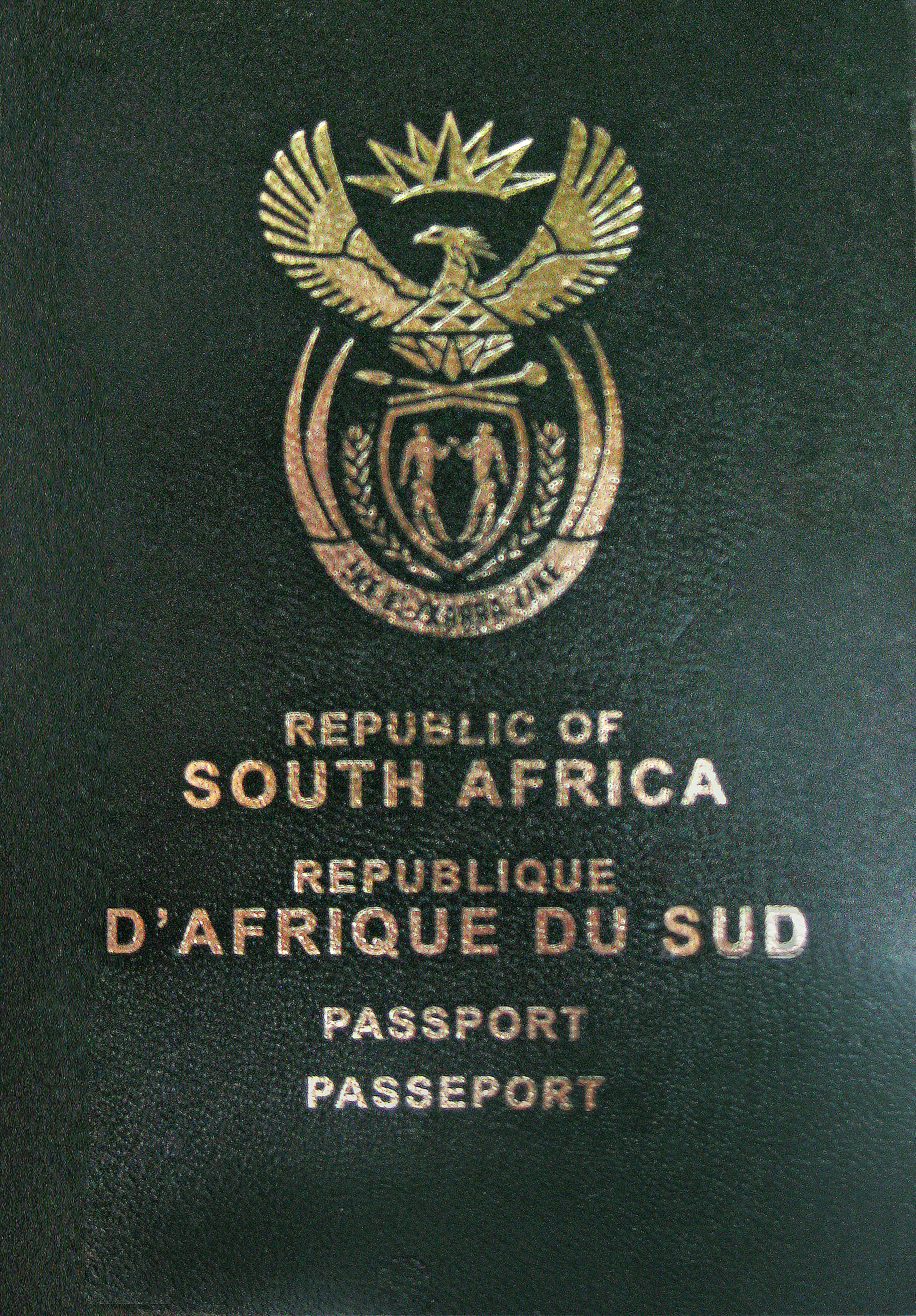
Front cover of a South African passport with new coat of arms, issued from 2009 onwards.

Pages 28 and 29 of a South African passport with an endorsement relating to foreign travel allowance (2007).

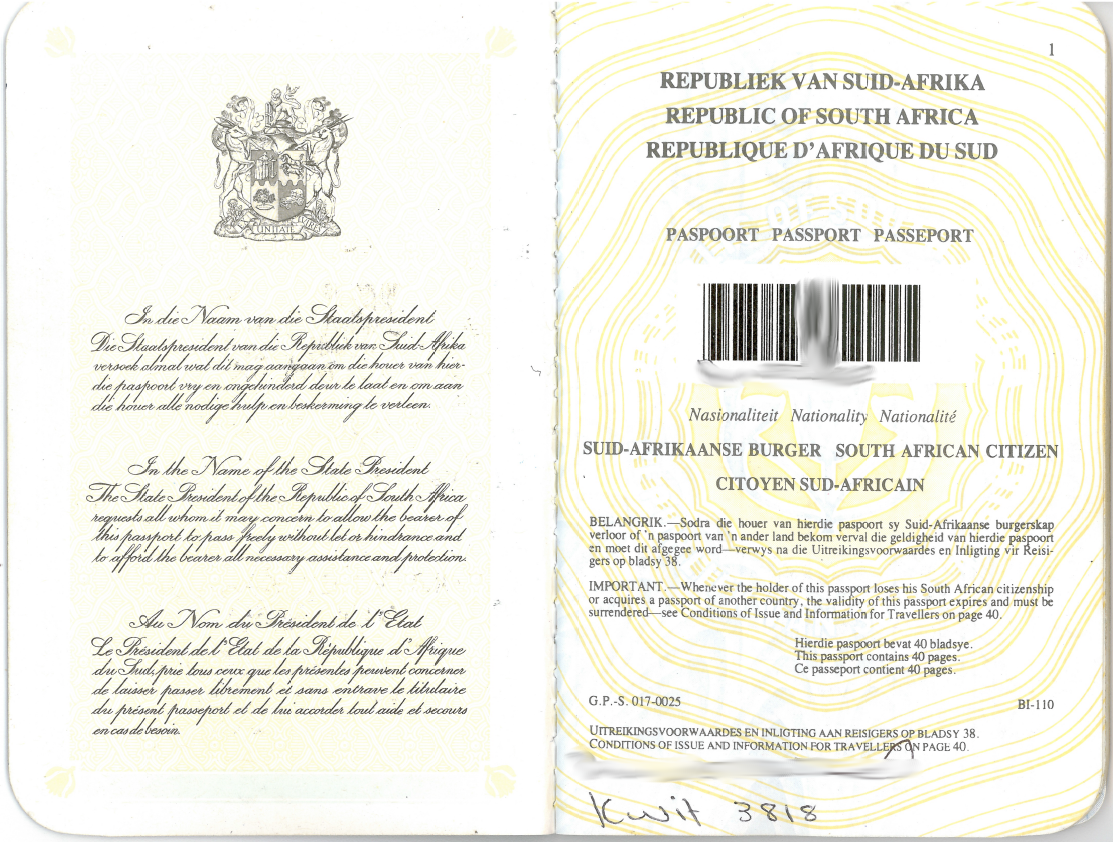
1995 South African Passport inside front cover page and page 1.

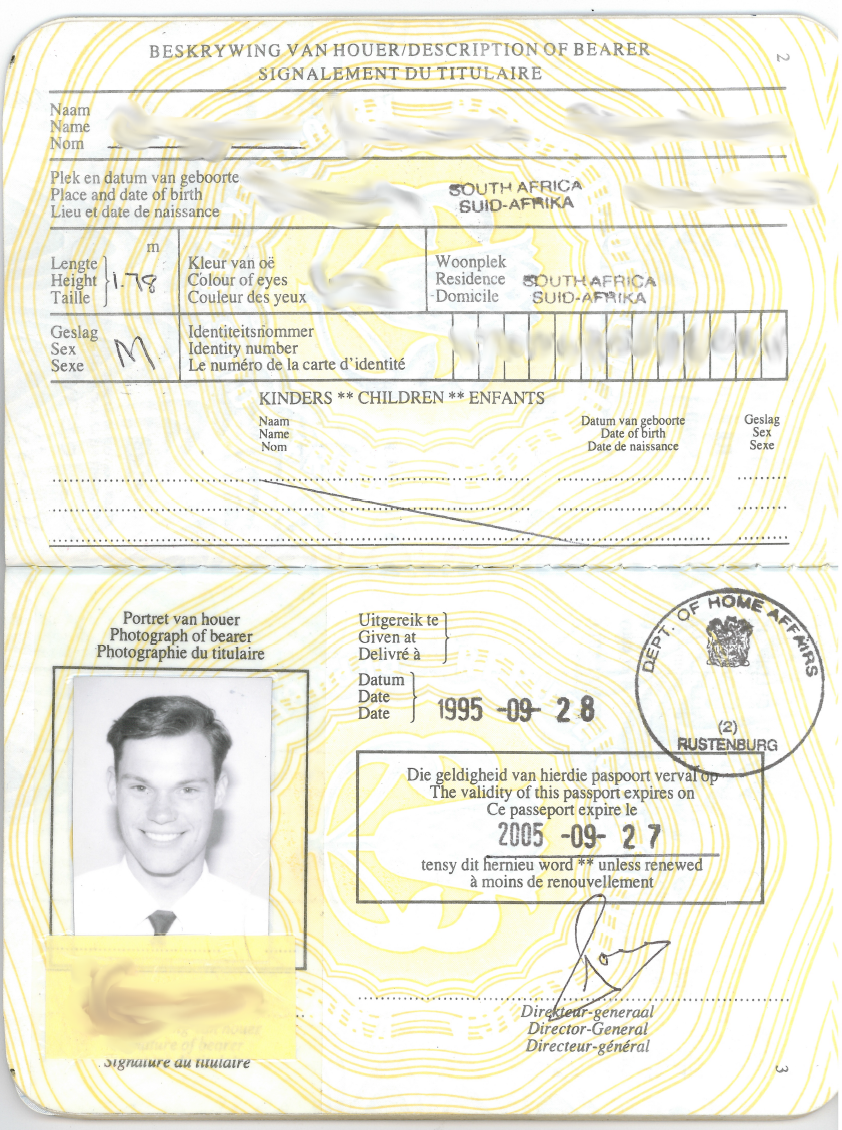
1995 South African Passport pages 2 and 3. Passport information was mostly handwritten and some stamps were used.

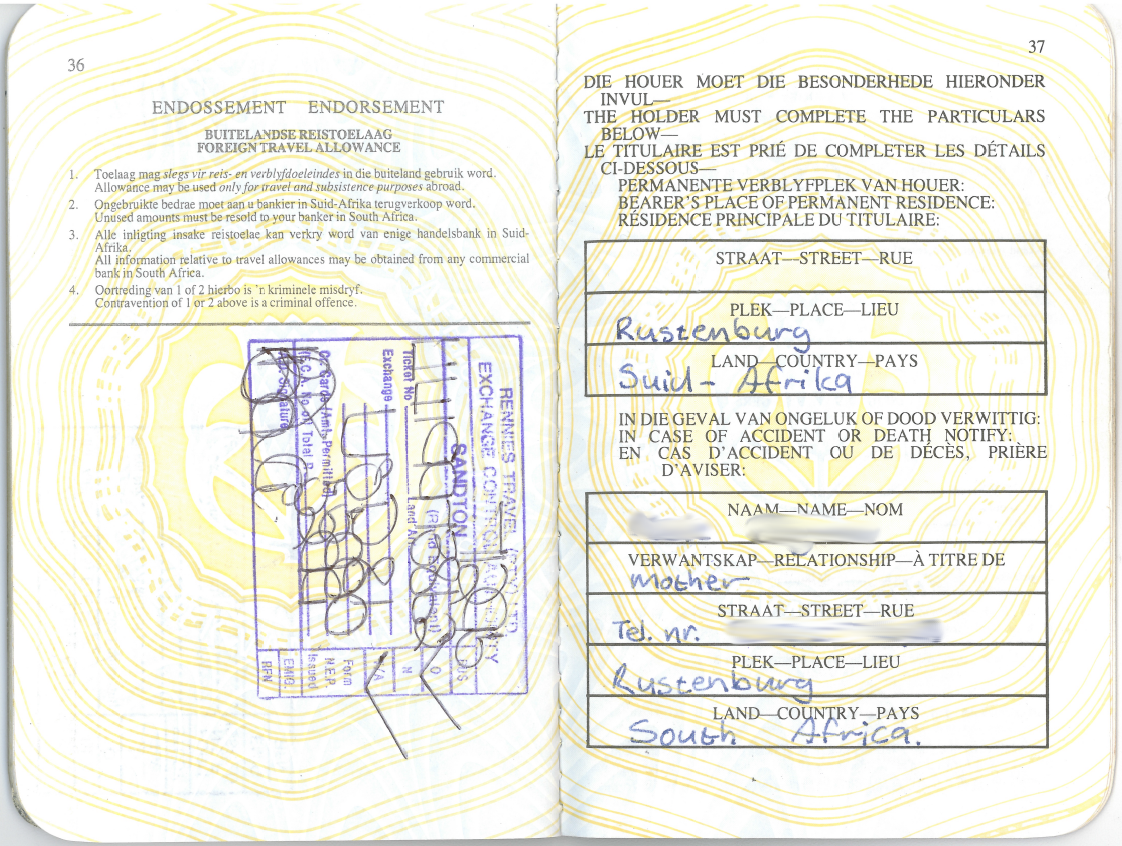
1995 South African Passport pages 36 and 37. Foreign travel allowance rules.

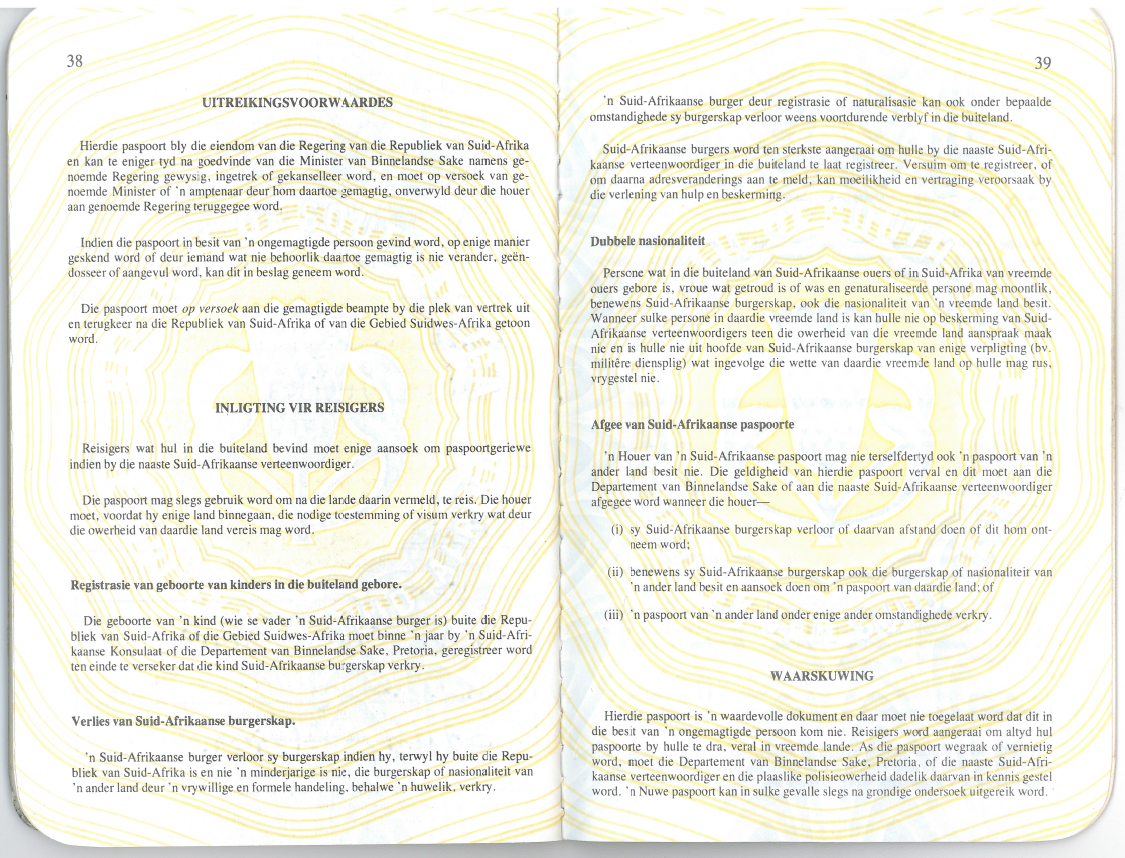
1995 South African Passport pages 38 and 39. Conditions of Issue, Information for Travellers and Caution notices in Afrikaans.

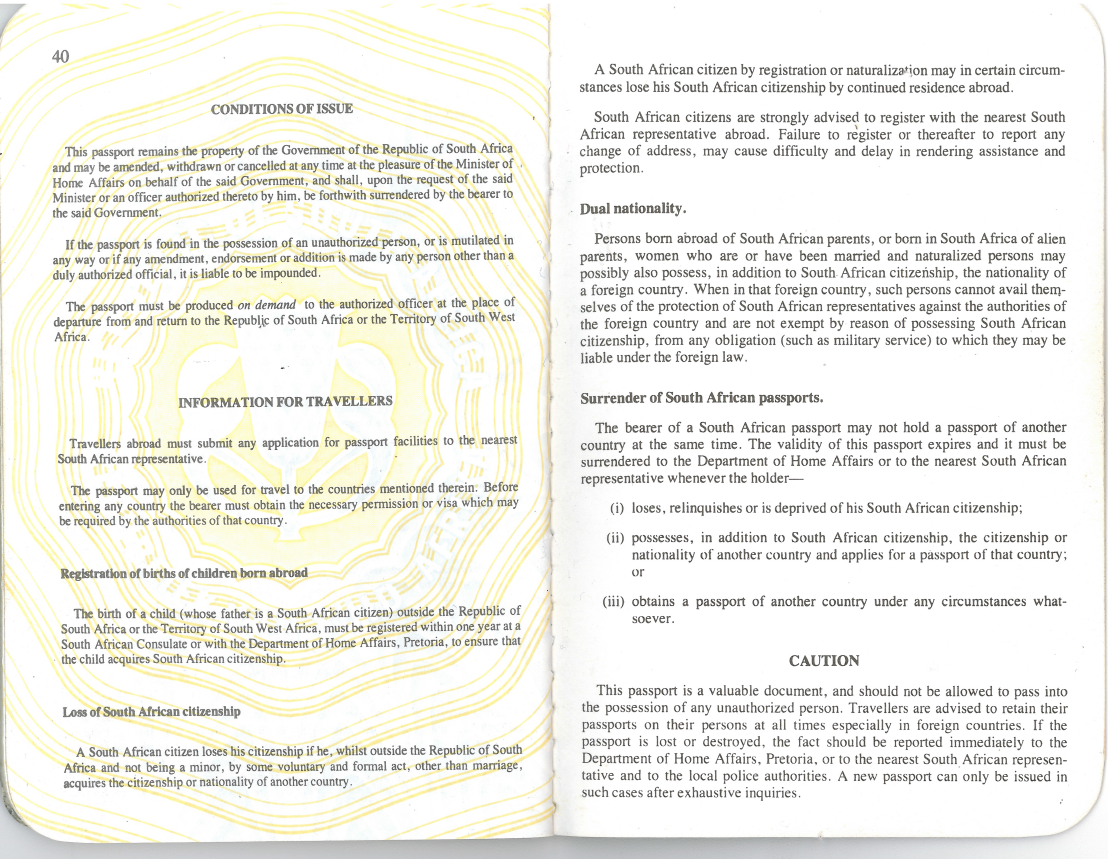
1995 South African Passport pages 40 and 41. Conditions of Issue, Information for Travellers and Caution notices.

== See also ==
- Visa requirements for South African citizens
- Department of Home Affairs (South Africa)
- Department of International Relations and Cooperation
- South African nationality law
- Document legalization
- Apostille Convention
