= Visa policy of South Africa =

Policy on permits required to enter South Africa

Visitors to South Africa must obtain a visa from one of the South African diplomatic missions unless they are citizens from one of the visa-exempt countries or citizens who may obtain an Electronic Travel Authorisation (ETA).

All visitors must hold a passport that is valid for at least 1 month from the date of arrival.

In September 2025, the Department of Home Affairs launched a new Electronic Travel Authorization (ETA) system. The ETA system is designed to simplify entry procedures into the country, and first went live in mid-October 2025, for the G20 summit participants. In late November, the second phase extended the requirement to obtain an ETA to all passport holders from these countries entering South Africa for business or tourism only for these specified countries: Mainland China, India, Indonesia and Mexico.

== Visa policy map ==
Visa policy of South Africa South Africa Visa not required (90 days) Visa not required (30 days) Electronic Travel Authorisation - ETA (90 days) eVisa Visa required

== Visa exemption ==
=== Ordinary passports ===
Citizens of the following countries and territories may enter South Africa without a visa for the following period:

90 days

- European Union member states (except Cyprus and Poland)

- Andorra
- Angola^{2}
- Argentina
- Australia
- Botswana
- Brazil
- Canada
- Chile
- Ecuador
- Ghana^{2}
- Iceland
- Israel
- Jamaica
- Japan
- Kenya^{2}
- Lesotho
- Liechtenstein
- Madagascar^{2}
- Malaysia
- Monaco
- Namibia^{2}
- New Zealand^{1}
- Norway
- Panama
- Paraguay
- Qatar^{1}
- Russia
- Saint Vincent and the Grenadines
- San Marino
- São Tomé and Príncipe^{1}
- Saudi Arabia^{1}
- Seychelles^{2}
- Singapore
- Switzerland
- Tanzania^{3}
- Trinidad and Tobago^{1}
- Tunisia
- United Arab Emirates^{1}
- United Kingdom^{1}
- United States
- Uruguay
- Venezuela
- Zambia^{3}
- Zimbabwe

30 days

- Antigua and Barbuda
- Bahamas^{1}
- Barbados
- Belize
- Benin
- Bolivia
- Cape Verde
- Costa Rica
- Cyprus
- Eswatini
- Gabon
- Guyana
- Hong Kong
- Jordan
- Macau^{1}
- Malawi
- Maldives
- Mauritius
- Mozambique
- Peru
- Poland
- South Korea
- Thailand
- Turkey

_{1 - Visa exemption applies to holders of ordinary passports only.}
_{2 - The maximum stay is 90 days per year for ordinary passport holders; this limit does not apply to non-ordinary passport holders.}
_{3 - The maximum stay is 90 days per year for all passport holders.}

Date of visa changes
- 26 December 1996: Brazil
- 29 April 2005: Mozambique
- 30 March 2017: Russia
- 1 December 2017: Angola
- 15 August 2019: New Zealand (resumed), Qatar, Saudi Arabia, United Arab Emirates
- 1 January 2023: Kenya
- 24 September 2023: Palestine
- 1 November 2023: Ghana
- 11 September 2025: Romania, Croatia
- 15 September 2025: Estonia, Latvia
- 16 October 2025: Bulgaria, Lithuania, Slovakia

Cancelled:

- Taiwan: 1 July 2005
- Slovakia: 18 April 2016 (was resumed in 2025)
- New Zealand: 16 January 2017 (was resumed in 2019)
- France, Germany, Hong Kong, Italy, Portugal, Singapore, South Korea, Spain, Switzerland, United Kingdom, United States of America: 25 March 2020 (since restored)
- Palestine: 7 December 2025

=== Non-ordinary passports ===
Citizens who are holders of diplomatic, official or service passports of the following countries do not require visas for visits of the indicated period and transit for up to 90 days (unless otherwise noted):

- Albania
- Algeria^{2}
- Angola
- Belarus
- Bulgaria
- Comoros
- Croatia
- Cuba
- Cyprus
- DR Congo
- Egypt^{2}
- Ghana
- Guinea
- Hungary
- India
- Indonesia^{2}
- Ivory Coast^{2}
- Kenya^{2}
- Liberia
- Madagascar^{2}
- Mali
- Mexico
- Morocco^{2}
- Mozambique
- Namibia^{2}
- Nigeria
- Paraguay^{1}
- Poland
- Romania
- Rwanda^{2}
- Senegal
- Slovakia
- Thailand
- Togo
- Tunisia
- Uganda
- Vietnam

_{1 - 120 days}
_{2 - 30 days}

== Electronic Travel Authorisation (ETA) ==
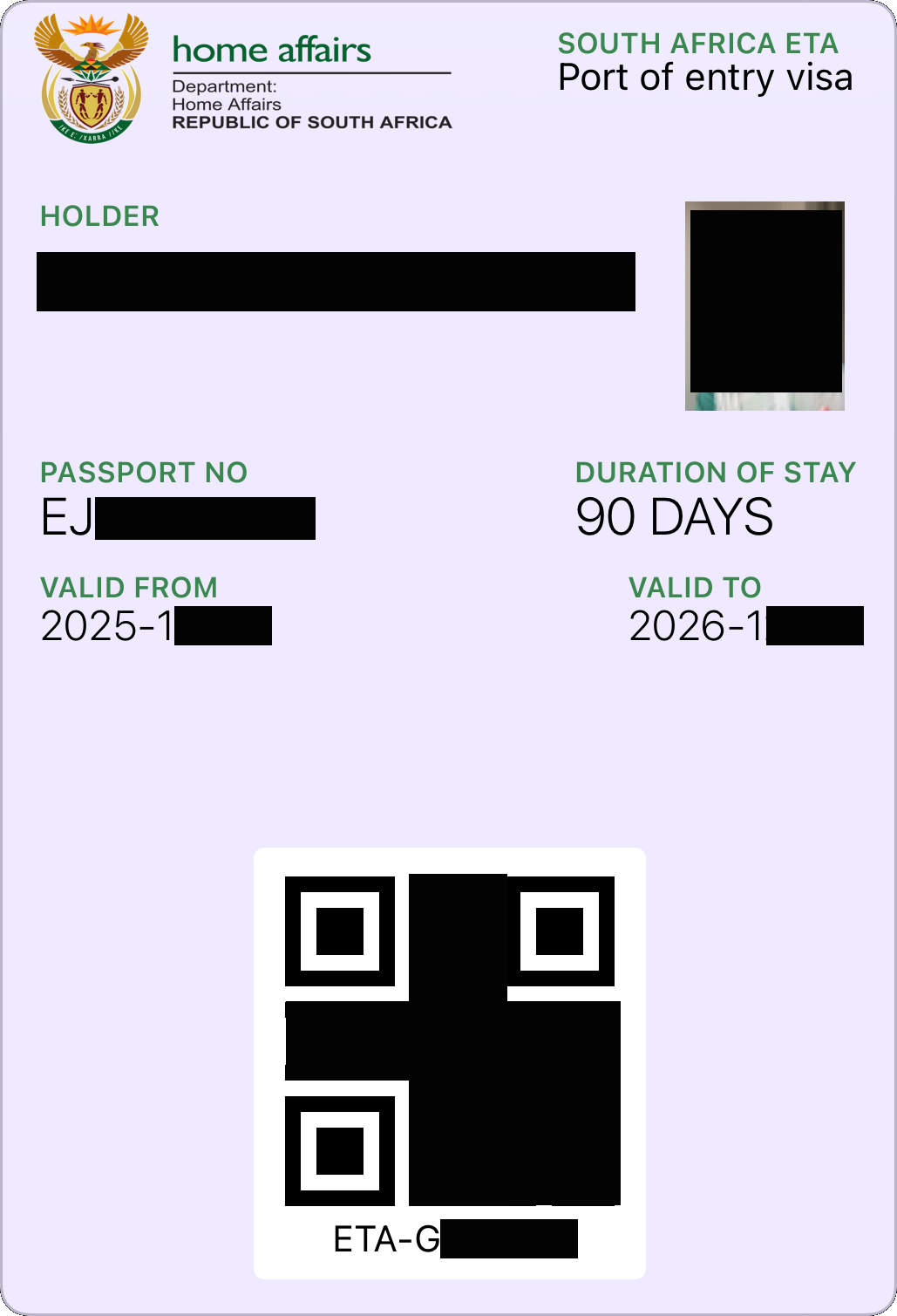
South Africa ETA / Port of Entry Visa (in Apple Wallet)

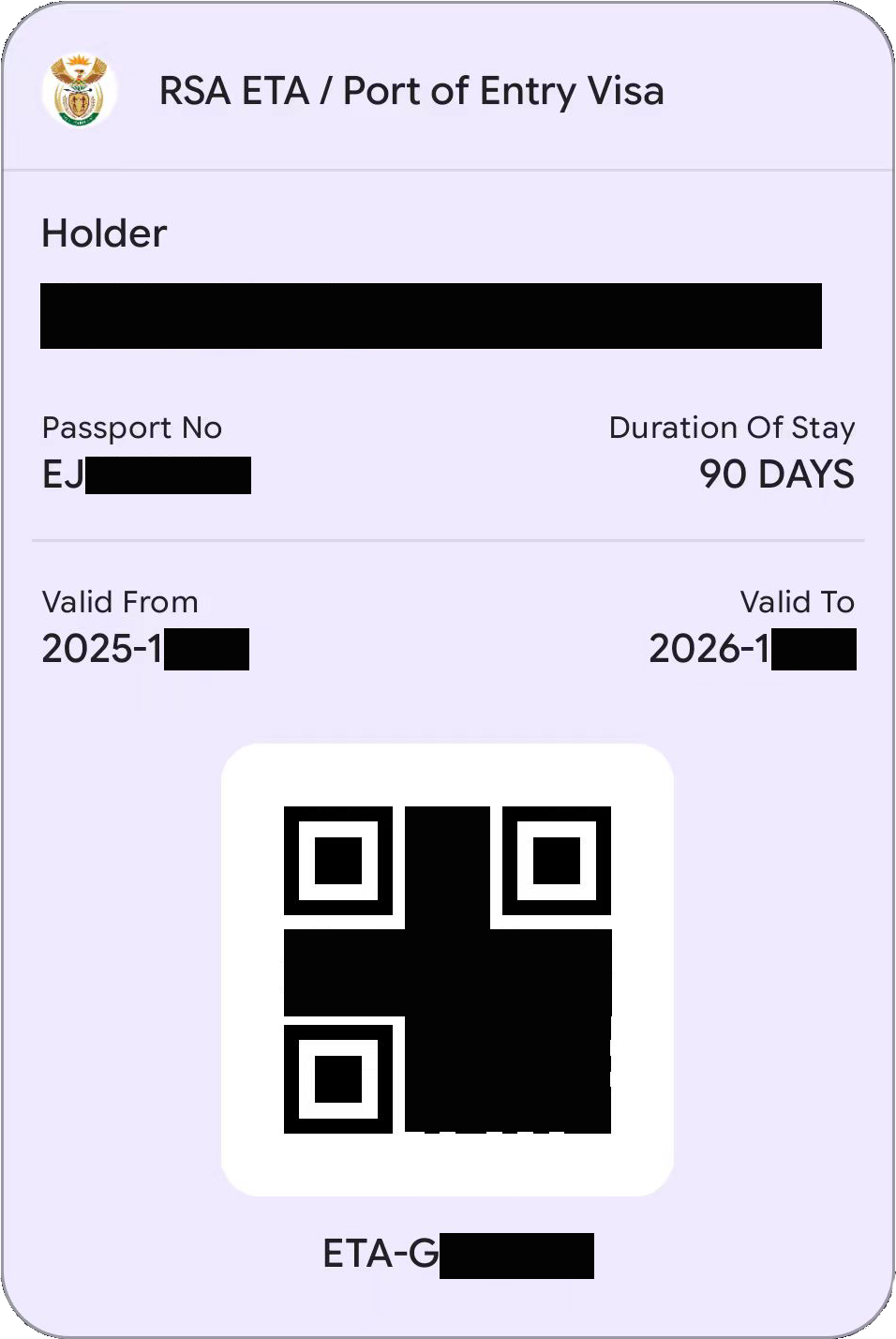
South Africa ETA / Port of Entry Visa (in Google Wallet)

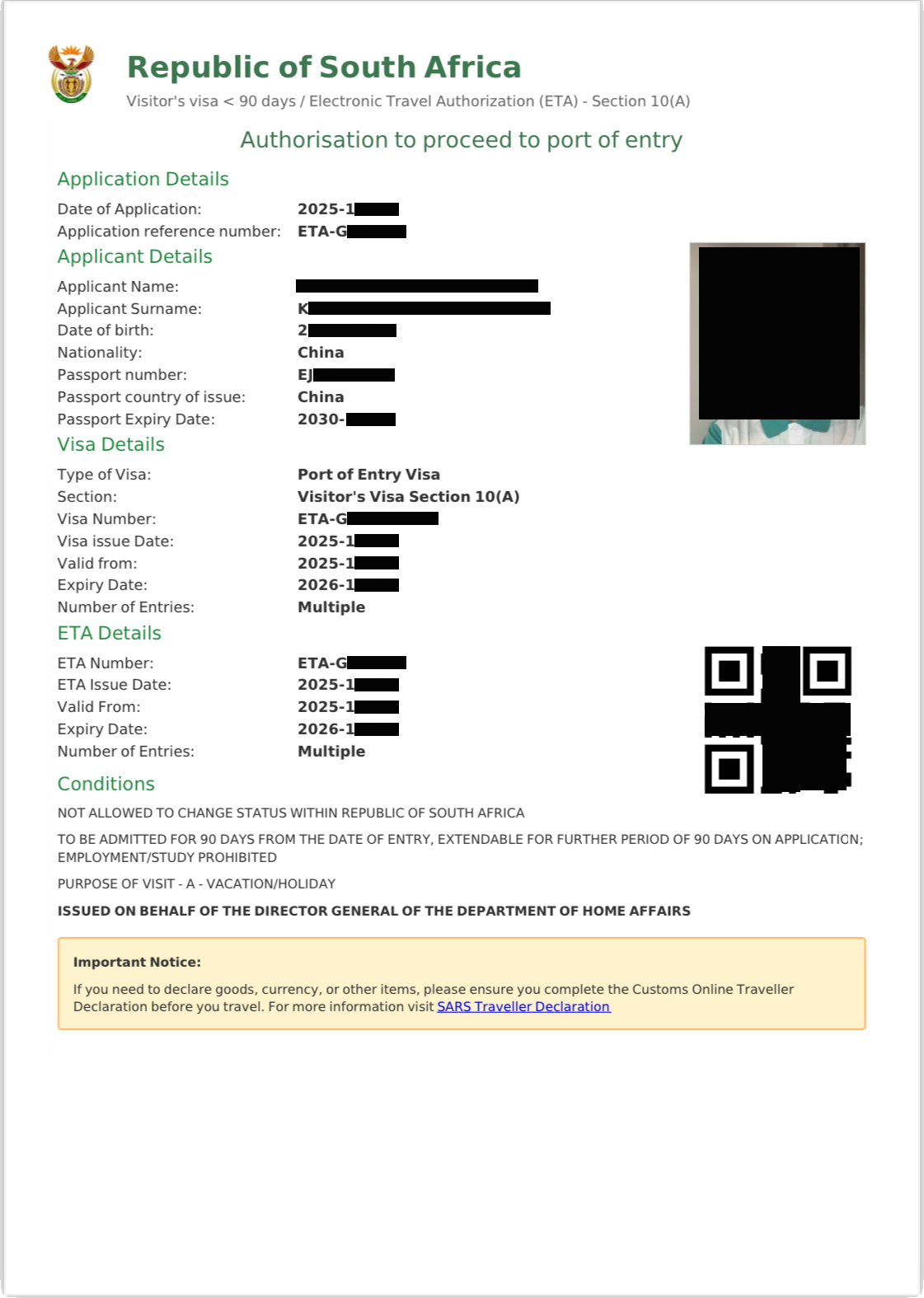
South Africa ETA / Port of Entry Visa (PDF)

Citizens of the following countries may apply for an ETA. The ETA is valid only for entry through the designated ports of entry: O. R. Tambo International Airport, Cape Town International Airport, Lanseria International Airport or King Shaka International Airport. The ETA is usually granted within 24 hours. The ETA is valid for up to 6 months, allows multiple entries, and each stay is limited to 90 days.

- Albania
- Algeria
- Armenia
- Bangladesh
- Belarus
- Bulgaria
- Cameroon
- China
- Colombia
- Comoros
- DR Congo
- Croatia
- Cuba
- Egypt
- Ethiopia
- France
- Georgia
- Germany
- Ghana
- Guinea
- India
- Indonesia
- Iran
- Israel
- Ivory Coast
- Japan
- Kenya
- Mali
- Liberia
- Lithuania
- Malaysia
- Mexico
- Moldova
- Morocco
- Netherlands
- Niger
- Nigeria
- Oman
- Pakistan
- Palestine
- Philippines
- Romania
- Russia
- Saudi Arabia
- Senegal
- Serbia
- Singapore
- Slovakia
- Switzerland
- Uganda
- Ukraine
- United Kingdom
- United States

== Electronic visa (e-Visa) ==
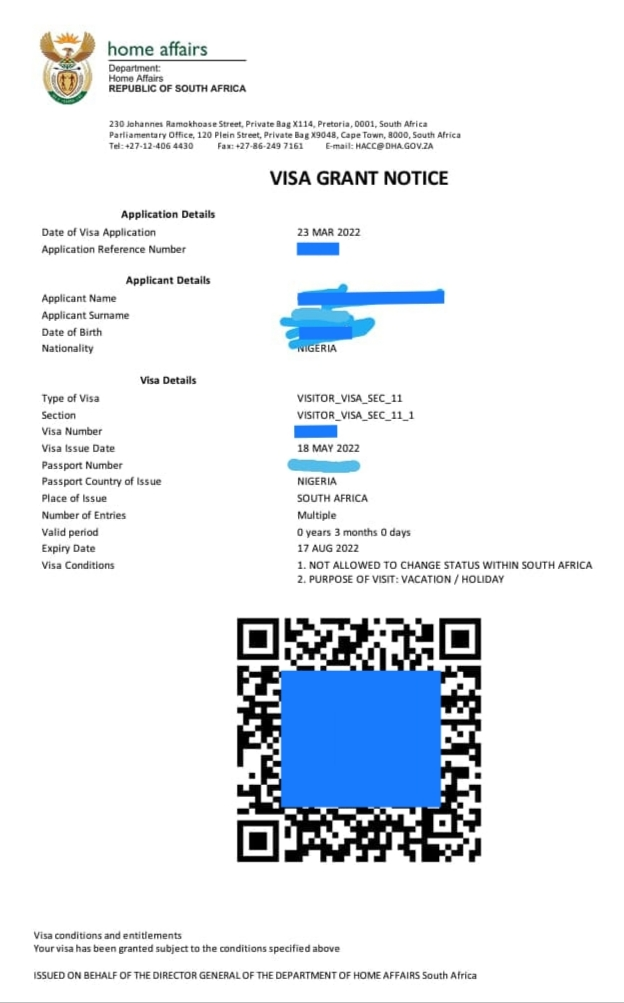
South African eVisa Grant Notice

Citizens of the following countries have the option to obtain an e-Visa:

- Albania
- Algeria
- Belarus
- Bulgaria^{1}
- Cameroon
- China
- Comoros
- Congo
- DR Congo
- Croatia^{1}
- Cuba
- Egypt
- Ethiopia
- France^{1}
- Germany^{1}
- Ghana
- Guinea
- India
- Indonesia
- Iran
- Ivory Coast
- Japan^{1}
- Kenya^{1}
- Liberia
- Lithuania^{1}
- Mali
- Mexico
- Morocco
- Niger
- Nigeria
- Oman
- Pakistan
- Philippines
- Romania^{1}
- Saudi Arabia^{1}
- Senegal
- Slovakia^{1}
- Uganda

_{1 - Already visa-exempt.}

== Eligible international organizations ==
Individuals holding the following travel documents are not required to obtain South African visas for visits of 90 days or less on bona fide official business:

- African Union laissez-passer
- Southern African Development Community (SADC) laissez-passer: Staff members of SADC who travel on SADC laissez-passer are exempt from visa requirements for bona fide official business visits of 90 days or less and transit.
- United Nations laissez-passer
- Interpol Passport

== Visa types ==
=== Visas issued by South Africa are for ===
- Tourism or visits to family or friends
- Medical treatment
- Working in the entertainment industry
- Attending a conference
- Treaty conditions compliance
- Maritime crew
- Cultural, economic and social exchange programmes
- Transit

=== Temporary residence visas issued by South Africa are ===
- Business visas
- Work visas
- Quota work visas
- General work visas
- Critical skills work visa
- Intra-company Transfer Work visa
- Corporate visas
- Study visas
- Exchange visas
- Retired persons' visa
- Relatives' visa
- Medical Treatment visa

The critical skills list outlines high-demand occupations that qualify foreign professionals for a Critical Skills Visa, helping to address skill shortages in key industries.

== Overstay consequences ==
It is a departure of a foreigner from South Africa on an expired visa that triggers an overstay.

A foreigner who remains in South Africa beyond the expiry of his/her visa and has not applied for a valid status is an illegal foreigner in terms of the South African Immigration Act.

An overstayer will upon departure be declared an undesirable person in terms of section 30(1)(f) of the Immigration Act.

- A foreigner who has overstayed less than 30 days the validity of his/her visa will be declared an undesirable person and banned for a period of 1 year.
- A foreigner who has overstayed more than 30 days the validity of his/her visa will be declared an undesirable person and banned for a period of 5 years.
- A foreigner who overstayed twice in a period of 24 months (repeat offenders) will be declared an undesirable person and banned for a period of 2 years.

The ban does not simply expire over time and the restrictions placed against the foreigner need to be removed and/or the undesirability uplifted. An undesirable person does not qualify for a port of entry visa, visa, admission into the Republic or a permanent residence permit.

== Visitor statistics ==
Most international tourists (overnight visitors) arriving in South Africa were residents of the following countries, ranked by the number of arrivals in 2025.

Country of residence	2025	2024	2023	2022	2021	2020	2019
Zimbabwe	2,307,196	2,183,260	2,106,940	1,233,790	410,730	684,546	2,258,794
Mozambique	2,078,635	1,591,751	1,341,037	944,308	522,866	422,537	1,333,195
Lesotho	1,395,346	974,369	1,163,826	835,921	355,255	448,745	1,563,448
Eswatini	958,716	842,318	733,949	403,762	177,650	214,947	917,631
Botswana	418,474	395,965	363,025	262,232	103,158	129,467	668,315
United Kingdom	403,714	349,883	356,160	283,031	45,777	132,384	436,559
United States	391,939	372,362	353,975	262,183	82,020	71,959	373,694
Germany	290,795	254,992	245,259	173,146	44,388	106,092	322,720
Malawi	230,640	163,726	138,918	114,352	56,313	53,365	199,079
Namibia	175,588	164,716	160,078	137,388	91,471	54,511	184,431
Zambia	175,165	154,921	145,244	116,076	68,669	46,486	152,064
Netherlands	140,338	132,422	131,371	90,289	21,757	35,026	144,071
France	135,007	125,823	119,974	76,077	19,761	41,023	165,038
Australia	121,361	98,544	86,250	53,769	4,059	20,720	111,439
India	69,680	75,541	79,774	55,506	17,662	18,892	95,621
Total (all countries)	10,498,506	8,919,370	8,483,333	5,698,062	2,255,699	2,802,320	10,228,593

== See also ==
- Tourism in South Africa
- Visa requirements for South African citizens
- List of ports of entry in South Africa
- List of diplomatic missions of South Africa
