= Nadim Lataif =

Lebanese security officer (born 1936)

Director General of the Lebanese General Directorate of General Security
- In office October 1988 – 1990

Personal details
- Born: 1936 (age 89–90) Baadarane, Chouf District, Lebanon
- Party: Free Patriotic Movement (1990s–2010)
- Spouse: Wadad Jabbour
- Children: 2
- Education: Saint Joseph University; Military College
- Awards: National Order of the Cedar

Military service
- Rank: Major general (P.S.C.)

Nadim Lataif (born 1936) is a Lebanese retired security officer who served as the general director of General Security between 1988 and 1990. After retiring from the post he joined the Free Patriotic Movement (FPM) and resigned from the FPM in 2010.

== Early life and education ==
Lataif was born Baadarâne, Chouf District, Lebanon, in 1936. He hails from a Christian family. He is a graduate of Saint Joseph University where he received a degree in law. He also obtained a diploma from the Military College in Beirut. In addition, he attended courses in security at the American Federal Bureau of Investigation.

== Career and activities ==
Lataif started his career as a lieutenant in the Lebanese Interior Security Forces (ISF) and later, was promoted brigadier general in the ISF. He became a major general at the same institution. He was appointed general director of General Security in October 1988 and served in the post until 1990.

Following his retirement Lataif joined the FPM headed by Michel Aoun. He was detained 7 August 2001 along with other Christian activists due to the allegations of harming Lebanon's relationship with Syria and of insulting Lebanese President Emile Lahoud. They were released on 20 August. Lataif resigned from the party in June 2010 because of his disputes with Aoun.

== Personal life ==
Lataif is married to Wadad Jabbour and has two daughters.

=== Awards ===
Lataif is the recipient of the National Order of the Cedar.
