= Wafiq Jizzini =

Lebanese major general

Major General Wafiq Jizzini
- وفيق جزيني
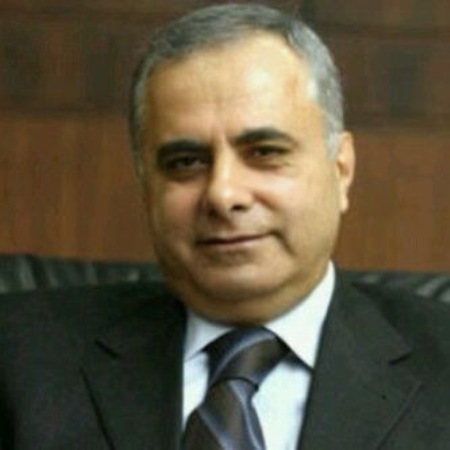

Director General of the Lebanese General Directorate of General Security
- In office 4 July 2005 – 4 December 2010
- Preceded by: Jamil Al Sayyed
- Succeeded by: Abbas Ibrahim

Personal details
- Born: December 4, 1951 Beirut
- Died: March 4, 2011 (aged 59) Germany
- Website: www.general-security.gov.lb

Military service
- Years of service: 1973 - 2010
- Rank: Major general
- Commands: -General Director of General Directorate of General Security 2005-2010 -Director of the Office of the Lebanese Army Commander 1998-2005

Major General Wafiq Jizzini (Arabic: وفيق جزيني; also spelled Wafic Jezzini or Wafik Jezzini; 4 December 1951 – 4 March 2011) was the general director of the General Directorate of General Security of Lebanon from 2005 to 2010.

== Career ==
Jizzini joined the Lebanese Army Military Academy on October 1, 1973. Jizzini took command of several sensitive positions in the Lebanese Army.

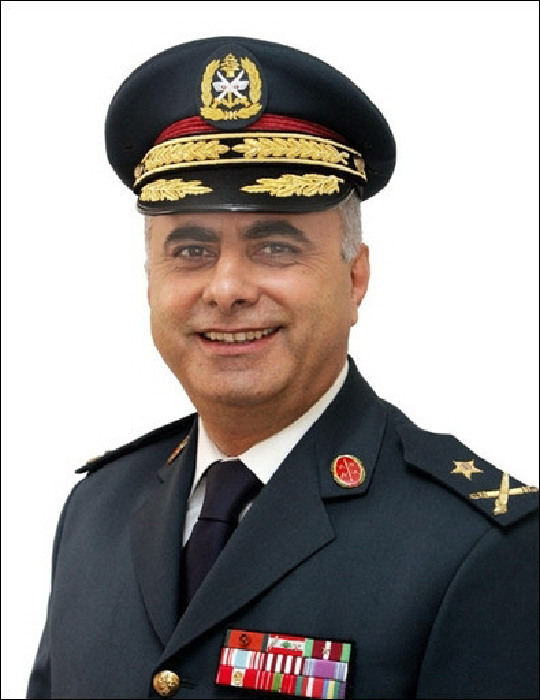
Major General Wafik Jizzini in Military Suit as the Director of the Office of the Lebanese Army Commander

The last position in the army was director of the Office of the Army Commander Michel Suleiman, before becoming the general director of the Lebanese General Directorate of General Security on July 4, 2005; succeeding the Major General (P.S.C.) Jamil Al Sayyed where this Directorate has been named by the United Nations as the "Best Administration of the year 2004" in the Middle East during the Jamil Al Sayyed era. On December 4, 2010, Jizzini reached the retirement age of 59. This was the end of his military life.

== Personal life ==
Jizzini was married to Aida Nassar.

== Death ==
Jizzini showed symptoms of pancreatic tumor months before retirement. He died three months after retirement on March 4, 2011, in a hospital in Germany while taking treatment.
