= Abbas Ibrahim (general) =

Lebanese major general (born 1959)

Major General Abbas Ibrahim
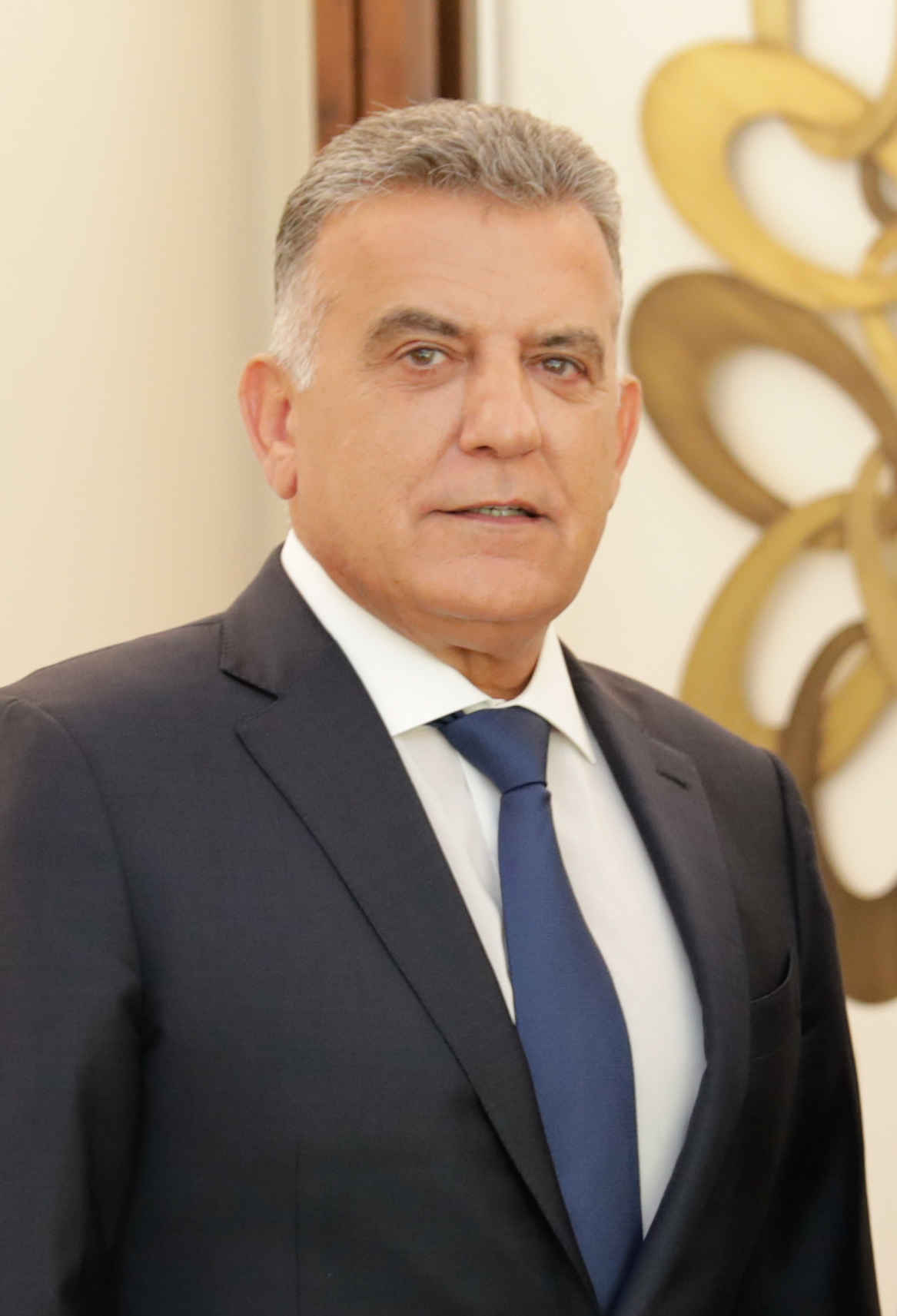
- Ibrahim in 2021

Director General of the Lebanese General Directorate of General Security
- In office 18 July 2011 – 1 March 2023
- Preceded by: Wafiq Jizzini
- Succeeded by: Hassan Choucair

Personal details
- Born: 2 March 1959 (age 67) Kawthariyat al-Sayyad, Lebanon
- Spouse: Ghada Zein
- Children: 4
- Website: www.general-security.gov.lb

Military service
- Years of service: 1980–present
- Rank: Major General (P.S.C.)
- Commands: General Director of General Directorate of General Security 2011–2023

Abbas Ibrahim (Arabic: عباس إبراهيم, romanized: ʿAbbās Ibrāhīm; born 2 March 1959) is a Lebanese major general who was the Director General of the General Directorate of General Security from 18 July 2011 until 1 March 2023.

== Early life ==
Abbas Ibrahim was born on 2 March 1959. He hails from the town of Kawthariyet al-Sayyad, Sidon District in Southern Lebanon. He has a Bachelor of Science degree in military science and a Bachelor of Science degree in Business Administration.

== Career ==
At the age of nineteen, he enrolled in military school and graduated three years later with the rank of lieutenant. Throughout the 1980s, he took part in several training courses in the military, culminating in an infantry course in the United States in 1989. This was followed by a computer course in 1996 to stay up to date with the electronic age. He also received advanced security training in the United Kingdom in 1998. In 1989, Ibrahim became the personal bodyguard of Arab League envoy to Lebanon Lakhdar Brahimi. When Jamil Al Sayyed was head of the Presidential Guards Squadron, he then appointed Ibrahim as one of the bodyguards to President Elias Hrawi and remained in that post until 1992 when he was tasked with protecting then newly appointed Prime Minister Rafik Hariri. In 1994, when Jamil Al Sayyed was deputy-Director of Army Intelligence, he appointed Ibrahim as head of the counterterrorism and espionage department at the intelligence directorate. Ibrahim, like his predecessors is closely associated with Hezbollah. However, like Speaker Nabih Berri, he enjoys excellent ties with several main parties in Lebanon, as opposed to Hezbollah, which has a limited number of allies and several rivals.

He was one of the key figures behind trying to get American journalist Austin Tice missing in Syria since August 2012 back home.

== Previous assignments ==
- 1982–1991: 3rd Infantry Brigade - 4th Infantry Brigade, Education & Training Institute, 1st Airborne Battalion - 10th Airborne Brigade.
- 1987–1988: Head of close protection team of Arab League envoy to Lebanon Lakhdar Brahimi.
- 1989–1992: Head of close Protection team of former Lebanese President Elias Hrawi.
- 1992–1993: Head of close protection team of former Prime Minister Rafic Hariri after assuming his first Cabinet.
- 1993: Strike Force – G2.
- 1994–1998: Head of Counter Terrorism and Espionage Section – Counter Terrorism.
- 1998–2002: Head of Counter Terrorism branch – G2.
- 2003–2005: Head of Lebanese Commando Regiment.
- 2005–2008: Head of South Lebanon G2 Branch.
- 2008–2011: First assistant to G2 Director.
- 2011–2023: Director General of General Security.

== Personal life ==
Ibrahim is married to Ghada Zein. He has four children: Mohammed, Ali, Bilal and Abbas. He is a Shia as all other general directors have been since 1998. Before then, the position was held by the Maronites since 1943. On 19 October 2020, Ibrahim tested positive for COVID-19 while in the United States. The Wall Street Journal reported that he had met national security adviser Robert C. O'Brien at the White House the week before to discuss American citizens held in Syria. The General Directorate of General Security said in a tweet that he was in good health. On 23 October 2020, he returned to Beirut. On 2 March 2023, he stepped down after attempts to renew term failed.

== Honour ==
- Albania: Grand Officer of the Order of Public Gratitude (2021)
