= General Directorate of General Security =

Lebanese intelligence agency

General Directorate of General Security المديرية العامة للأمن العام
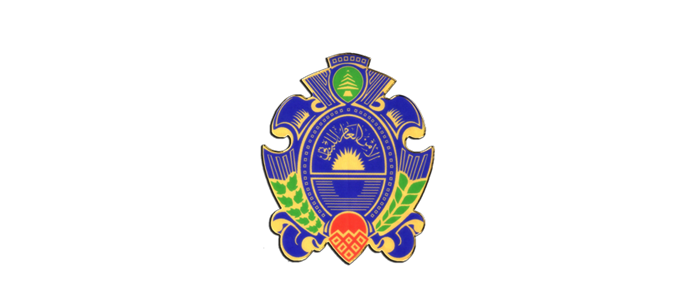

Intelligence and Security Agency overview
- Formed: 21 July 1921; 105 years ago
- Preceding Intelligence and Security Agency: National Intelligence Agency (GDGS)
- Headquarters: Beirut, Lebanon
- Employees: Classified
- Annual budget: Classified
- Intelligence and Security Agency executive: Hassan Choucair, General Director
- Website: http://www.general-security.gov.lb

The General Security Directorate (Arabic: الامن العام, romanized: al-Amn al-'Aam) is a Lebanese intelligence agency founded on July 21, 1921 and originally known as the "first bureau". On June 12, 1959, Decree-Law No. 139, in force from that date, was published. Under this decree the General Security becomes a branch depending on the power of the minister of interior and headed by a director general, as president. On December 16, 1959, Organizational Decree No. 2873 was published. It establishes a regional organization of general security and creates more branch, regional departments, border, maritime and air.

Its full name is "General Directorate of General Security" (Direction Générale de la Sûreté Générale (DGSG), المديرية العامة للأمن العام).

Its primary function is to collect and gather intelligence, and to inform the Lebanese government to ensure national security and public order throughout the territory of the Republic of Lebanon. General Security is also responsible for monitoring resident aliens on Lebanese soil by issuing them visas and entry permits into Lebanese territory, and residence permits and card stays. It monitors the media by ensuring they do not touch with their content, public order, or undermines an institution of the Lebanese state, and community components to the Lebanese society.

Finally, it is responsible for issuing passports and travel documents to Lebanese citizens. Until 1998 the General Director of the General Security Directorate had been a Maronite when former President Emile Lahoud appointed a Shia for the first time since 1943.

The General Security National Day as celebrated in Lebanon is on the 27th of August of each year.

== Security Functions ==
- Gathering Intelligence, Collecting information concerning political, economical and social matters.
- Collect information concerning political, economic and social interest of the Government.
- Evaluate, analyse and use information in different areas.
- Participate in legal investigations in the context of offences against the internal or external security of the state.
- Supervise the preparation and implementation of security measures.
- Ensure security cooperation, with respect to different functions.
- Fight against anything that undermines security by monitoring and prosecuting acts of sabotage, the authors of disorder and rumor mongers to compromise security.
- Fights against dissolved, secret, and forbidden parties or associations.
- Prepares notices and prosecution of research, travel bans.
- Participates in monitoring borders, airspace, and territorial waters.

== Foreigner Service ==
- Provide the facilities required by foreign parties, concerning delegations, missions, invitations and meetings of Arab and foreign visitors.
- Control entry of foreigners in Lebanon, their stays and departures; control their movement and ensure their safety.
- Controlling foreigners on Lebanese territory.
- Prepare correspondence relating to the deportation of foreign and security incidents.
- Follow cases concerning residence of aliens.
- Coordinating the relations with foreign missions working in Lebanon.
- Responsible for liaison and relationships between embassies and diplomatic missions Arab, foreign, international internships in the fields of sessions and abroad.
- Monitor and facilitate departures and arrivals of travelers of different nationalities.
- Escort statesmen foreigners arriving in Lebanon and ensure their safety during their travel on the Lebanese territory.

== Technical Functions ==
- Grant permits for passage.
- Issue of Lebanese passports.
- Grant permanent residence permits and temporary.
- Organize and issue travel documents for Palestinian refugees residing in Lebanon or from foreign countries.
- Grant entry visas.
- Supervise all procedures relating to civil status and naturalization applications.
- Escort the Lebanese statesmen.

== Cyber-espionage ==
According to an investigation from Lookout and the Electronic Frontier Foundation, the GDGS has run at least 10 campaigns since 2012 to compromise the security of Android phones in at least 21 countries. The GDGS hacking team, designated "Dark Caracal", used phising attacks to trick targets into downloading impersonations of WhatsApp, Viber and Signal, allowing the GDGS to extract gigabytes of data. The reporting was denied by Major General Abbas Ibrahim.

== Perception ==
The General Directorate of General Security in Lebanon under the leadership of his Director, Major General Jamil al Sayyed (1998-2005), began for several years a large process of modernization, efficiency, transparency and reorganization of its departments, creating new Territorial Centres of the General Security in each of the Regional Departments by being closer to the hamlets and isolated villages and to meet expectations of Lebanese citizens, thus, deliver their documents quickly and to ensure public safety in the area there. For example, renewals of documents can be done through the Post Lebanese (Lebanon Post), which transmits them to the General Security then go to renewal applicants, such as passports are renewed in one week. The Lebanese General Security has also initiated a process of reform of complaints handling procedures and administrative complaints, thus, better and faster support for Lebanese citizens' requests and complaints.

These efforts were continued by the successor, Major General Abbas Ibrahim since he took office in July 2011 in full agreement with Interior Minister Marwan Charbel and his successor Nouhad Machnouk.

General Security aspires to play a facilitating role in the economic and tourism of Lebanon (tracking incoming tourists to Lebanon depending on the General Security).

== Directors ==
Current director

- Hassan Choucair, Brigadier-General, General Director of the General Directorate of General Security.

Former directors

- Elias Bayssari, Major-General, General Director of the General Directorate of General Security from 3 March 2023 – 17 March 2025
- Abbas Ibrahim, Major-General, General Director of the General Directorate of General Security from 18 July 2011 – 1 March 2023
- Wafiq Jizzini, Major-General, General Director of the General Directorate of General Security from July 4, 2005 till December 4, 2010
- Jamil Al Sayyed, Major-General, General Director of the General Directorate of General Security from December 1998 till April 25, 2005
- Raymond Rafael, General Director of the General Directorate of General Security from Jan 18, 1991 to December 21, 1998
- Nadim Lataif, Brigadier, General Director of the General Directorate of General Security from October 11, 1988 to January 18, 1991
- Jamil Nehme, Dr., General Director of the General Directorate of General Security from April 10, 1984 to October 11, 1988
- Zahi Bustani, General Director of the General Directorate of General Security from December 11, 1982 to April 10, 1984
- Farouk Abillamah, Prince, General Director of the General Directorate of General Security from April 14, 1977 to September 22, 1982
- Antoine Dahdah, Brigadier General, General Director of the General Directorate of General Security from October 21, 1971 to November 1, 1976
- Josef Salameh, General Director of the General Directorate of General Security from January 7, 1965 to July 21, 1971
- Tawfiq Jalbout, General, General Director of the General Directorate of General Security from October 3, 1958 to December 31, 1964
- Farid Chehab, Prince, General Director of the General Directorate of General Security from July 31, 1948 to September 19, 1958

== See also ==
- Internal Security Forces
- Lebanese Armed Forces
- State Security
