= Jamil Al Sayyed =

Lebanese politician (born 1950)

- جميل السيد
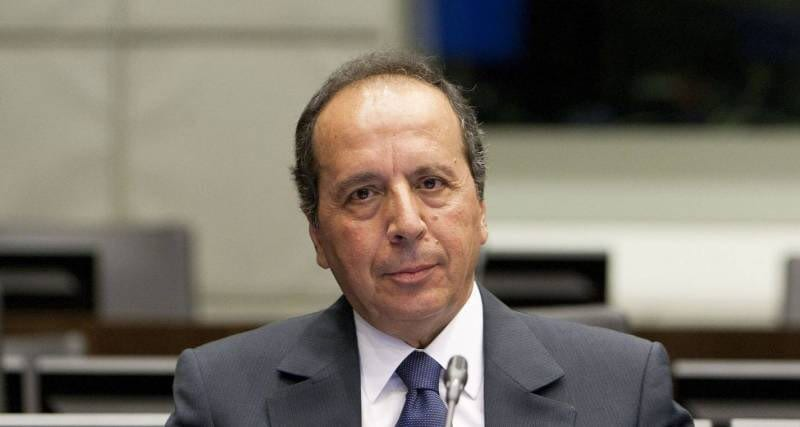
- Al Sayyed in 2015

Member of Lebanese Parliament
- Incumbent
- Assumed office 21 May 2018
- Constituency: Baalbek-Hermel District

Director General of the Lebanese General Directorate of General Security
- In office 21 December 1998 – 5 May 2005
- Preceded by: Raymond Roufael
- Succeeded by: Wafiq Jizzini

Deputy Director of Intelligence Directorate Lebanese Armed Forces
- In office August 1991 – December 1998

Personal details
- Born: 1950 (age 75–76) Al Nabi Ayla, Lebanon
- Education: Lebanese Army Military Academy

Military service
- Rank: Major General (P.S.C.)

Jamil Al Sayyed (Arabic: جميل السيد; born 1950) is a Lebanese politician and a current member of the parliament of Lebanon. He is the former head of Lebanon's Sureté Générale or Lebanese General Security Directorate. He was arbitrarily detained and released after four years from 2005 to 2009, due to his alleged involvement in the assassination of former Lebanese prime minister Rafik Hariri.

He was released on 29 April 2009 due to "inconsistencies in the statements of key witnesses and of a lack of corroborative evidence to support these statements and to the fact that some witnesses had modified their statements and one key witness had expressly retracted his original statement incriminating the persons detained". In 2020 the Special Tribunal for Lebanon declared officially in his final judgment on Hariri assassination case that Jamil Sayyed's detention was illegal and that the United Nations (UN) should compensate him and publicly apologize for his illegal detention, and that the Lebanese authorities should do the same. He was never charged with a crime. He is a holder of many medals and recognitions, among which the most prestigious French Legion of Honour, at the rank of COMMENDEUR.

== Early life and education ==
Sayyed was born into a Shia Muslim family in the Bekaa village of Al Nabi Ayla, near Ablah, in 1950. He graduated from al Hikmeh school in Beirut.

== Career ==
After graduation from the Lebanese Army Military Academy in 1971, he was sent to France for a one-year military training course with the French Army. After his return to Lebanon he was assigned for two years as military trainer for cadet officers, then he was sent to the Egyptian Army in Cairo for a military course as antitank missile trainer before serving in the armored corps as commander of Anti-tank Autonomous Unit of the Lebanese Army in Beirut until June 1976.

Due to the civil war which started in Lebanon early 1975 and led to the division of the Lebanese Army into religious units, Sayyed refused to join any of them.

Later in September 1976 he decided to join the First Brigade in Bekaa, the Bekaa valley which remained the only multi- communitarian unit in the Lebanese army during the civil war under brigadier general Ibrahim Shaheen, who at that time and in coordination with other Christian, Muslim and Druze officers established the Vanguards of the Lebanese Army against the Arab Lebanese Army formed of defected army units and headed by the defected Lt Ahmad Al Khatib who was backed by Palestinian Fatah Organization (PLO) and its leftist Lebanese allies.

In 1978, after a temporary reunification of the Lebanese army, Sayyed was sent again to France for a military course as battalion commander. He was later assigned as head of the military intelligence branch of the First Brigade after it was reincorporated into the Lebanese Army and became army intelligence.

Next, in 1982, Major Jamil Al Sayyed was sent for a six months military intelligence course with the US Army in Arizona, United States. He was back just after the beginning of the Israeli invasion of Lebanon in June 1982. After the starting of the Israeli withdrawal from Lebanon by mid 1983, Lt Colonel Sayyed was appointed as deputy then chief intelligence officer in the Bekaa Valley Region where he stayed in post until 1991 during which there was two failed attempts in 1985 and 1987 to assassinate him by the then growing Hizbullah under the leadership of Sheikh Subhi al-Tufayli whose goal was to occupy the army military bases in the region. Sayyed was mildly wounded but One of his bodyguards Sgt Ahmad Maarabouni was killed in the second attempt.(Military Records)

From 1989 to 1990, within his functions as regional chief intelligence in Bekaa where PM Elias Hrawi was elected as president just after the assassination in Beirut on 22 November 1989 of the newly elected president René Moawad, Sayyed was assigned for the protection of the new president until mid 1990 after he formed the temporary presidential guard unit.(Ref. Military Records)

In 1991, Sayyed left his post in Bekaa Valley after being appointed as deputy director of the Military Intelligence Directorate of the Lebanese Army where he contributed in the reunification of the Army after the end of the civil war in 1991 by executing and proposing to its Commander General Emile Lahoud the global plan for the fusion of the sectarian communitarian units into a full unified army.

Six years later, in 1998, he was promoted to the rank of major general, then Lebanese President Emile Lahoud appointed him as the Director-General of the General Directorate of General Security (GDGS-DGSG).

The General Directorate of General Security in Lebanon under the leadership of his Director, Major General Jamil al Sayyed (1998–2005), began for several years a large process of modernization, efficiency, transparency and reorganization of its departments, creating new Territorial Centres of the General Security in each of the Regional Departments by being closer to the hamlets and isolated villages and to meet expectations of Lebanese citizens, thus, deliver their documents quickly and to ensure public safety in the area there. The Lebanese General Security has also initiated a process of reform of complaints handling procedures and administrative complaints, thus, better and faster support for Lebanese citizens' requests and complaints.(General Security Records)

This large reform led the United Nations in its annual report for 2004 to consider the Lebanese General Security as one of the top five best Official Institutions in the Middle East. The Surete Generale and its Director Sayyed were praised the same year too by the council of Maronite Bishops headed by Patriarch Sfeir as the only transparent, uncorrupted and efficient Lebanese institution.(GDGS Records-UN Report 2004).

From 1998 to 2005 Sayyed was the principal coordinator between the Lebanese government and the United Nations Force deployed in South Lebanon to control the Lebanese-Israeli borders, He was a member of the committee that was founded on 6 December 2000 to receive the Lebanese detainees from Syrian prisons and investigate their files.

In March 2000 Sayyed was assigned to head the military team for the verification of the Israeli withdrawal from South Lebanon which was occupied by Israel since 1978. He negotiated with UN Envoy Terry Road Larsen for the post withdrawal measures and discipline on the Lebanese Israeli borders.(Leb.Army records-2000)

As of 2002 Sayyed was assigned by the Lebanese government to head the negotiating team for the exchange of prisoners between Lebanon and Israel with the German mediation which led to their liberation from both sides by January 2003.(Leb Government Records-2003)

== Resignation and political detention ==
Sayyed resigned from office on 25 April 2005 as a result of the heavy pressure from the opposition in Lebanon after Rafik Hariri's assassination on 14 February 2005. He was one of seven officials whose resignations had been requested by the Lebanese opposition after the assassination. These demands were initially not taken into consideration by Lebanese regime. Wafiq Jizzini succeeded Sayyed as general security chief on 5 October 2005.

A few months after his resignation Sayyed was arrested on 30 August 2005 by a recommendation of the International Commission (UNIIIC) to the Lebanese authorities for his alleged role in the assassination. He stayed four years in prison with no charges or accusation or trial. Within his detention from 2005 to 2009, the Central Bank of Lebanon lifted the bank secrecy of Sayyed and family accounts and froze their assets according to the demand of the International Commission for the sake of the investigation in Hariri assassination inside and outside Lebanon. In 2009 after Sayyed was cleared by the decision of the Special Tribunal for Lebanon, these financial restrictions were officially canceled. The United Nations High Commission for Human Rights in Geneva considered in an official report of its Work Team on arbitrary detention dated 30 November 2007, that his detention is arbitrary violating the articles 9 and 14 of the International Pact for Civil and Political Rights. In the annual reports of US Department of State concerning human rights for the years 2006, 2007 and 2009 Sayyed was considered as an arbitrary detained by the Lebanese authorities.

== Post-release period ==
After his release unconditionally by the decision of the Special Tribunal for Lebanon in April 2009, Sayyed was authorized by the decision of the same Tribunal on 12 May 2011, to receive from the Tribunal the elements of proof related to the false witnesses who caused his arbitrary detention for 4 years to allow him to pursue them legally before national competent justices.

On 18 August 2020, the Special Tribunal for Lebanon (STL) presided by Judge David Ray issued its final judgement on Hariri assassination case and its opinion on Sayyed illegal and arbitrary detention from 2005 to 2009 describing his detention as a severe violation of the international law by the Lebanese Justice and the International Investigation Commission, Judge Ray concluded in his judgment that both the United Nations and the Lebanese Authorities should apologize and compensate Jamil Sayyed for the years he spent in the arbitrary detention |judgment STL Of Aug.18, 2020.

== Parliamentary Elections ==
In May 2018, Jamil Al Sayyed ran for the 2018 Lebanese general election as an independent candidate to represent the constituency of Baalbek-Hermel at the National Assembly. He won his seat as a member of parliament with the highest number of preferential votes in Bekaa area and the second highest number of preferential votes across Lebanon.

Al Sayyed is still an active member in the Lebanese parliament, and was re-elected in the 2022 Lebanese general election with a lower number of preferential voices than 2018 due to an internal conflict between candidates in the same electoral list, which led Sayyed to attack his running mates on X platform after the elections results.

He is considered according to Reuters to be a potential successor to Nabih Berri, the Shia speaker of parliament, but there should be a consensus in this regards, due to the directness of Al Sayyed that doesn't comfort some political parties.
