= 2020 Beirut explosion =

Ammonium nitrate explosion in Lebanon

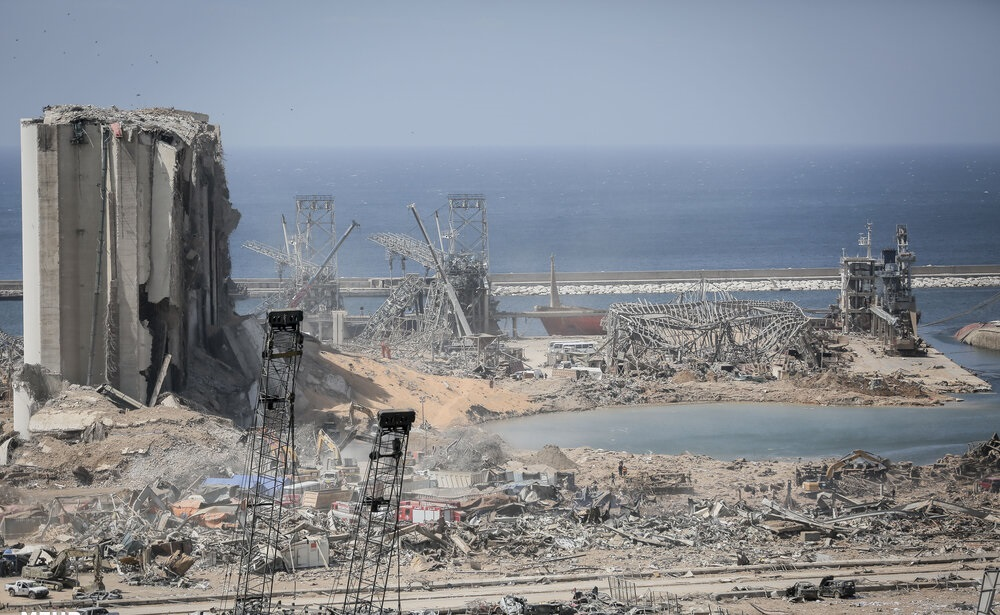
- Aftermath of the explosion, with the destroyed grain silos to the left and the flooded blast crater to the right
- Date: 4 August 2020; 6 years ago
- Time: 18:08:18 EEST (UTC+03:00)
- Venue: Port of Beirut
- Location: Beirut, Lebanon; 33°54′05″N 35°31′09″E
- Type: Ammonium nitrate explosion
- Cause: Fire
- Deaths: 218
- Injuries: 7,000+
- Property damage: US$15+ billion
- Displaced: ~300,000

On 4 August 2020, a major explosion occurred in Beirut, Lebanon, caused by the ignition of 2,750 tonnes of ammonium nitrate. The chemical, confiscated in 2014 from the cargo ship MV Rhosus and stored at the Port of Beirut without adequate safety measures for six years, detonated after a fire broke out in a nearby warehouse. The explosion resulted in at least 218 deaths, 7,000 injuries, and approximately 300,000 displaced people, alongside property damage estimated at US$15 billion. The blast released energy comparable to 1.1 kilotons of TNT, ranking it among the most powerful non-nuclear explosions ever recorded and the largest single detonation of ammonium nitrate.

The explosion generated a seismic event measuring 3.3 in magnitude, as reported by the United States Geological Survey. Its effects were felt in Lebanon and neighbouring regions, including Syria, Israel, and Cyprus, over 240 km (150 mi) away. Scientific studies noted that the shockwave temporarily disrupted Earth's ionosphere. Adjacent grain silos at the Port of Beirut sustained major damage. In July and August 2022, two years after the explosion, portions of the silos collapsed following fires caused by remaining grain stocks.

The Lebanese government declared a two-week state of emergency in response to the disaster. Protests, which had been ongoing since 2019, grew in scale, leading to the resignation of Prime Minister Hassan Diab and his cabinet on 10 August 2020. Claims surfaced suggesting Hezbollah's possible connection to the explosion, citing unverified reports of weapons stored at the site. Hezbollah denied the allegations but participated in demonstrations opposing the official investigation.

== Background ==
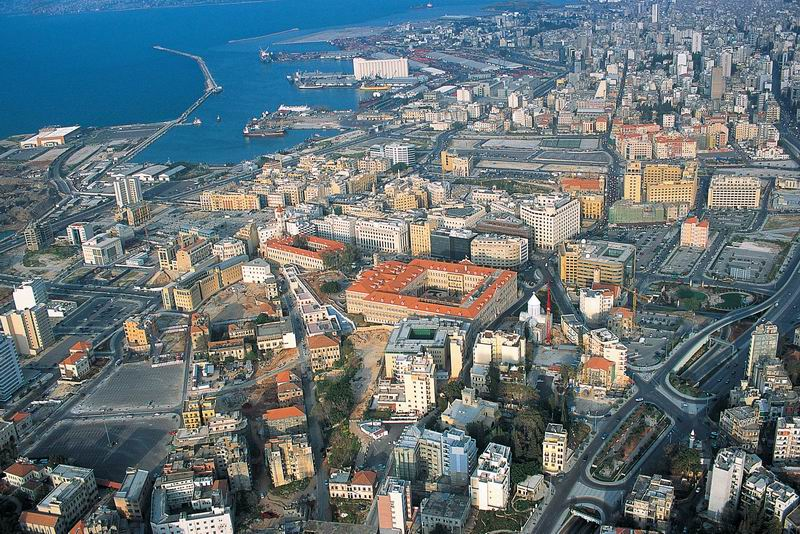
The explosion occurred behind the grain silos in this view.

The economy of Lebanon was in a state of crisis before the explosion, with the government having defaulted on debt, the Lebanese pound plunging, and a poverty rate that had risen past 50%. In addition, the COVID-19 pandemic had overwhelmed many of the country's hospitals, several of which were already short of medical supplies and unable to pay staff due to the financial crisis. The morning before the explosion, the head of the Rafik Hariri University Hospital, which served as the main COVID-19 medical facility in Lebanon, warned that it was approaching full capacity.

The government-owned Port of Beirut serves as the main maritime entry point into Lebanon and a vital piece of infrastructure for the importation of scarce goods. The Beirut Naval Base is a part of the port. The port included four basins, 16 quays, twelve warehouses, a large container terminal, and a grain elevator with a total capacity of 120,000 tonnes that served as a strategic reserve of cereals for the country. The grain elevator was built in the 1960s as part of an expansion plan advanced by Palestinian banker Yousef Beidas.

=== Iran's involvement ===
Behnam Shahriyari is a senior official within Iran's Islamic Revolutionary Guard Corps (IRGC), specifically associated with Unit 190, a division responsible for clandestine arms transfers and logistical operations. He has been implicated in arms smuggling, money laundering, and oil trafficking on behalf of the IRGC Quds Force. Reports indicate that since 2011, the Iranian shipping company Liner Transport Kish (LTK), managed by Shahriyari and Mojtaba Mousavi Tabar, delivered significant quantities of ammonium nitrate to Hezbollah. Between 2011 and 2014, multiple shipments were sent to Beirut, including a consignment transported aboard the MV Rhosus vessel in August 2013, carrying approximately 2,750 tons of ammonium nitrate.

=== MV Rhosus ===
On 27 September 2013, the Moldovan-flagged cargo ship MV Rhosus set sail from Batumi, Georgia, to Beira, Mozambique, carrying 2,750 tonnes (3,030 short tons) of ammonium nitrate. Rhosus was owned by a company based in Panama but was regarded by the captain as under the de facto ownership of Russian businessman Igor Grechushkin. The shipment had been ordered by an African explosives manufacturing company for mining in Mozambique. However, reporting by Der Spiegel has found that it was not Grechushkin who owned Rhosus, but rather Cypriot businessman Charalambos Manoli, who maintained a relationship with the bank used by Hezbollah in Lebanon.

On 21 November 2013, the ship made port in Beirut. Some sources said it was forced to port due to mechanical issues and possibly engine problems, while other sources claimed the owner did not have sufficient funds to pay tolls for the Suez Canal and attempted to take on a shipment of heavy machinery in Beirut. The heavy machinery was stacked on top of the doors to the cargo space containing the ammonium nitrate, causing the doors to buckle, which damaged the ship. After inspection by port state control, Rhosus was deemed unseaworthy, and was forbidden to set sail. Eight Ukrainians and one Russian were aboard, and with the help of the Ukrainian consul, five Ukrainians were repatriated, leaving four crew members to care for the ship.

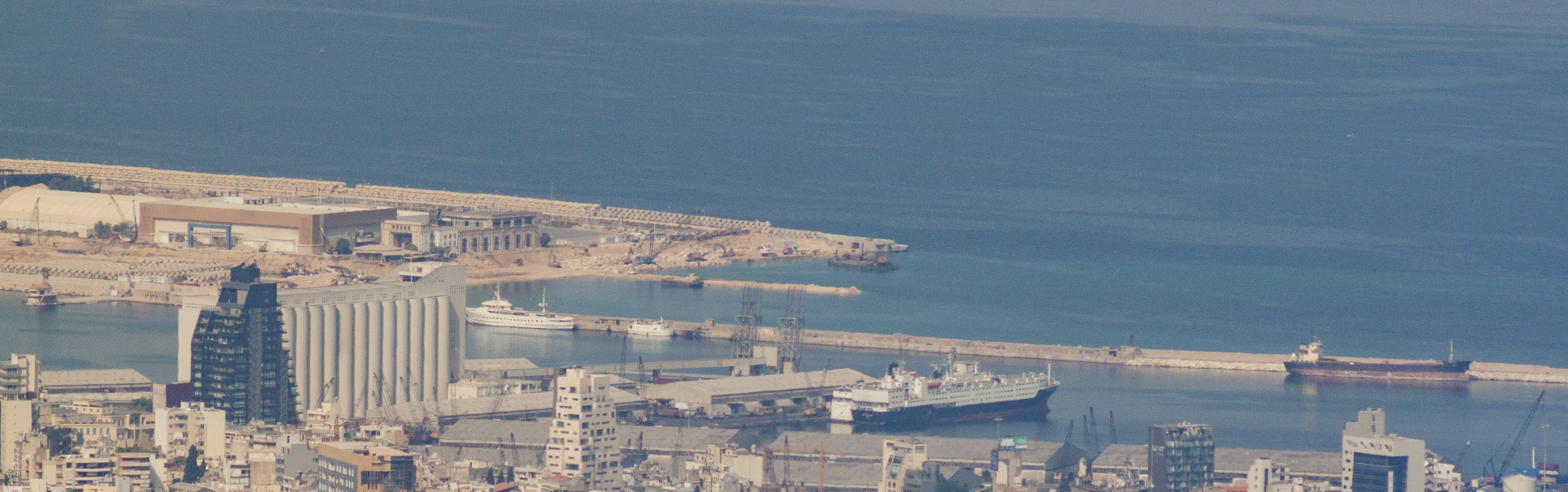
The port of Beirut in 2017, with Rhosus moored on the right. Livestock carriers Abou Karim I and Abou Karim III, both severely damaged in the explosions, are in the center, the latter largely obscuring the former.

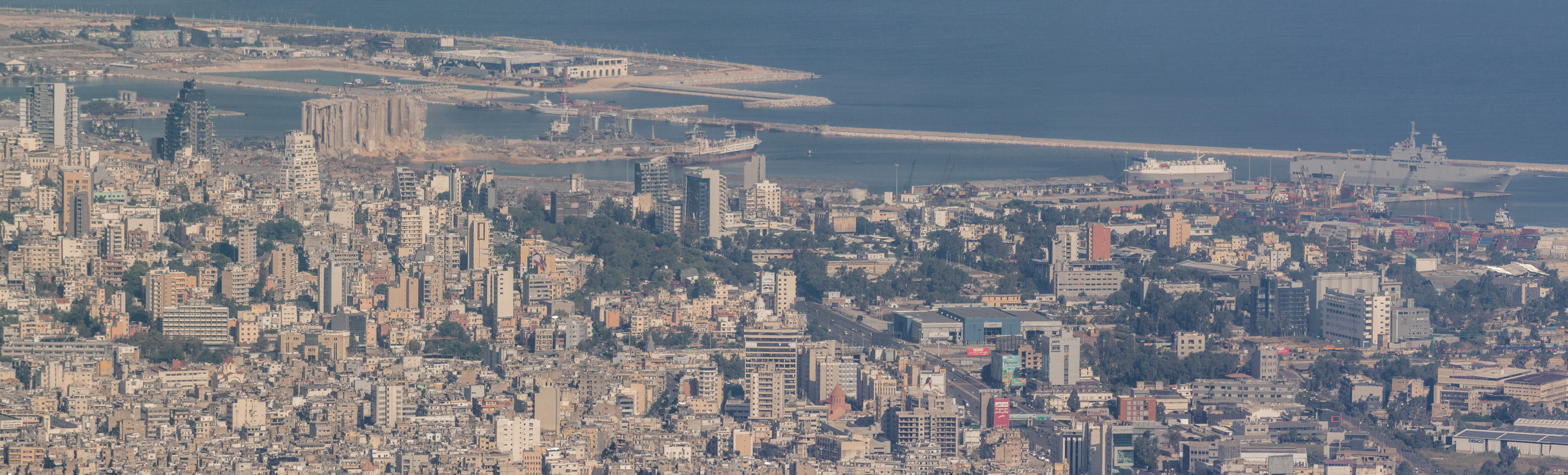
The Port of Beirut eleven days after the disaster. The large ship on the right is the French amphibious assault ship Tonnerre, which arrived in the port on 13 August to provide food, construction materials, medical supplies, and personnel.

Grechushkin reportedly went bankrupt, (Note: The captain, Boris Prokoshev, wrote that Grechushkin had told him he had gone bankrupt, but noted that he did not believe Grechushkin.) and after the charterers lost interest in the cargo he abandoned Rhosus. The ship soon ran out of provisions, and the remaining crew were unable to disembark due to immigration restrictions. According to Lloyd's List, port state control seized Rhosus on 4 February 2014 due to US$100,000 in unpaid bills. The ship had accrued port fees and been fined for refusing cargo. Lawyers argued for the crew's repatriation on compassionate grounds because of the danger posed by the cargo still aboard the ship, and an Urgent Matters judge in Beirut allowed them to return home. They had been forced to live aboard the ship for about a year.

By order of the judge, Rhosus's cargo was brought ashore in 2014 and placed in Warehouse 12 at the port, where it remained for the next six years. Rhosus sank in the harbor in February 2018.

Lebanese customs officials had sent letters to judges requesting a resolution to the issue of the confiscated cargo, proposing that the ammonium nitrate be either exported, given to the Lebanese Armed Forces or sold to the private Lebanese Explosives Company. (Note: Ammonium nitrate has a long history of industrial disasters globally, and thus has been gradually phased out over concerns for misuse and safety.) Letters had been sent on 27 June and 5 December 2014, 6 May 2015, 20 May and 13 October 2016, and 27 October 2017. One of the letters sent in 2016 noted that judges had not replied to previous requests, and pleaded:

In view of the serious danger of keeping these goods in the hangar in unsuitable climatic conditions, we reaffirm our request to please request the marine agency to re-export these goods immediately to preserve the safety of the port and those working in it, or to look into agreeing to sell this amount ...

Each time, the requests were procedurally declined due to errors by the customs officials. However, the officials persisted in making the same requests instead of correcting the errors. Legal experts also said that the customs officials could have confiscated the material unilaterally.

== Explosion ==
=== Fire and first explosion ===
Around 17:45 local time (14:45 UTC) on 4 August 2020, a fire broke out in Warehouse 12 at the Port of Beirut. Warehouse 12, which was waterside and adjacent to the grain elevator, stored the ammonium nitrate that had been confiscated from Rhosus alongside a stash of fireworks. Around 17:55 local time (14:55 UTC), a team of nine firefighters and one paramedic, known as Platoon 5, was dispatched to fight the fire. On arrival the fire crew reported over the radio that there was "something wrong" as the fire was immense and produced "a crazy sound."

The initial explosion, at about 18:07 local time (15:07 UTC), likely triggered by the stored fireworks, created a large plume of grey smoke and bright firework flashes, and heavily damaged Warehouse 12 with a force equivalent to around 1.5–2.5 tons of TNT.

=== Second explosion ===
The moment of the explosion was captured during a video call between Moroccan journalist Maryam Toumi from the BBC Arabic office in Beirut and head of the Moroccan Agency for Sustainable Energy Faissal Al Assil.

Red smoke over Lebanon on the evening of the explosion. Video from eyewitness livestream.

External videos
- 4K footage of Lebanon explosion shows Beirut Port blast unfolding in slow motion, Al Arabiya

The second explosion, 33 to 35 seconds later, was far more substantial and felt in northern Israel and in Cyprus, 240 kilometers (150 miles) away. It rocked central Beirut and created a large red-orange cloud, briefly ringed by a white condensation cloud. The red-orange colour of the smoke from the second explosion was caused by nitrogen dioxide, a byproduct of ammonium nitrate decomposition.

By the next morning, the main fire that led to the explosion had been extinguished.

=== Yield ===
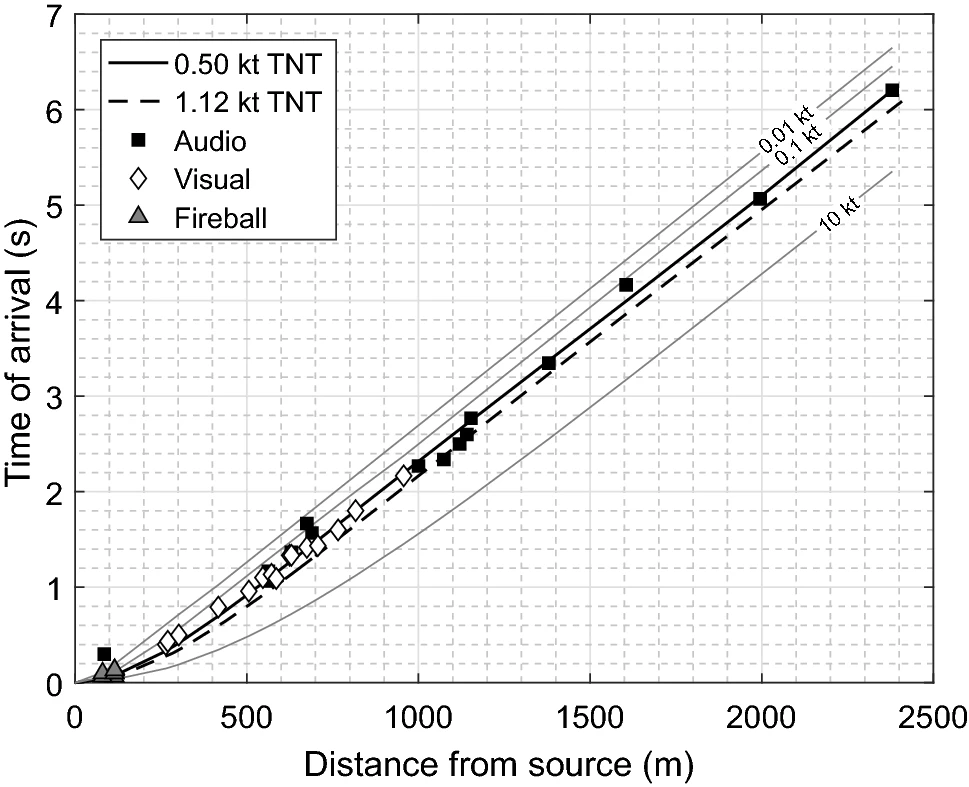
Collated time of arrival vs distance from analysis of social media video footage, with the best estimate (0.50 kt TNT) and reasonable upper limit (1.12 kt TNT) curves determined from regression analysis.

Despite inefficient transmission of the shock waves into the ground, (Note: Because the explosion occurred on the earth's surface, the seismic waves generated by the blast are not as strong as they would have been had the equivalent amount of energy been released from underground sources.) the United States Geological Survey measured the event as a 3.3 local magnitude earthquake, while the Jordan Seismological Observatory reported that it was equivalent to a 4.5 M_{L} earthquake. A study of seismic signatures of the explosion by the Federal Institute for Geosciences and Natural Resources in Germany produced a yield estimate between 0.5 and 1.1 kt of TNT. Experts from the Blast and Impact Research Group at the University of Sheffield estimated that the explosion was one of the largest artificial non-nuclear explosions ever recorded. Later, they were able to quantitatively support this rapid estimate as they compiled more distance versus time of arrival data as new videos of the explosion became available on social media platforms. Their study found that the best estimate and upper bound prediction of the yield of the explosion are 0.5 and 1.12 kt of TNT, respectively. This is equal to around 1 GWh of energy. Another study used several videos of the explosion to describe the evolution of the fireball size and estimated the Beirut explosion yield to be 0.6 ± 0.3 kt of TNT. The Beirut explosion was similar to explosions of large amounts of ammonium nitrate in Texas City, United States, in 1947; in Toulouse, France, in 2001; and Tianjin, China, in 2015. (Note: As a point of comparison, the Halifax Explosion in 1917 (which was not caused by ammonium nitrate) was the world's largest non-nuclear explosion, releasing the equivalent energy of roughly 2.9 kilotons of TNT (12,000 GJ).)

An independent estimate by the International Monitoring System of the Comprehensive Nuclear-Test-Ban Treaty Organization based on infrasonic data obtained an explosive yield equivalent to 0.5–1.1 kt of TNT, making it the sixth-largest accidental artificial non-nuclear explosion in human history.

Aouad et al. (2021) derived the kinematics of the fireball from publicly available videos. Considering a time of separation between the fireball and the shock wave at about 170 milliseconds, they concluded a TNT equivalent mass of 0.2 ± 0.08 kt of TNT or 520 ± 200 tons of ammonium nitrate at a distance of 130 meters from the explosion center. This result is consistent with Dewey 2021 that suggests that the Beirut explosion TNT equivalence is an increasing function of distance.

Temsah et al. 2021 estimated the magnitude of the explosion. The research was based on a structural engineering approach with numerical non-linear finite element modelling of the grain elevator facing Warehouse 12 where the explosion took place. The numerical study model was based on silos data (geometrical and material properties) and the use of the Conventional Weapons Effects Blast Loading (CONWEP), and the Coupled Eulerian-Lagrangian (CEL) methods to generate the blast load. The analysis results proved that an amount equivalent to 564 t of AN (or 220 t of TNT) was adequate to generate damages similar to those resulting from the explosion. This amount represents 20.5% of the original stored amount (2750 t). As for the state of the grain elevator, results showed it was structurally unstable and should be demolished or properly strengthened.

Kim and Pasyanos (2021) put the yield between 0.62 and 1.25 kt, with the best and most likely estimate at 0.9 kt of TNT, with a likely depth of 2 m.

It has been suggested that not all of the ammonium nitrate was still in the warehouse at the time of the explosion. Some experts estimated that there were only 700 to 1,000 tonnes remaining out of the original 2,750, with the rest having been removed or stolen since 2014. The US Federal Bureau of Investigation estimated there were about 500 tonnes left, a number which was later cited by Prime Minister Hassan Diab. However, there were also two experts who concluded that most or all of the ammonium nitrate exploded.

=== Cause ===
Warehouses at the Port of Beirut were used to store explosives and chemicals including nitrates, which are common components of fertilisers and explosives. (Note: Other hazardous materials stored at the port included hydrofluoric acid oxidiser, benzoyl peroxide, calcium hypochlorite, picric acid, oils and several unknown chemicals. On 3 September 2020, the Lebanese Army announced that they found an additional 4.35 tonnes of ammonium nitrate in the customs' "Detention Port", outside the seaport near entrance number 9.) The General Director of General Security, Major General Abbas Ibrahim, said the ammonium nitrate confiscated from Rhosus had exploded. The 2,750 tonnes (3,030 short tons) of ammonium nitrate was the equivalent to around 1,155 tonnes of TNT (4,830 gigajoules). The failure to remove the materials from the warehouse and relocate them was attributed to mismanagement of the port, corruption of the government, and inaction of the flag registry's country and ship owner.

The Lebanese Broadcasting Corporation International (LBCI) reported that, according to attendees of a Higher Defence Council briefing, the fire was ignited by workers welding a door at a warehouse. A former port worker said that "[t]here were 30 to 40 nylon bags of fireworks inside warehouse 12" that he had personally seen. An American diplomatic cable on 7 August said it "remains unclear ... whether fireworks, ammunition or something else stored next to the ammonium nitrate might have been involved" in worsening the warehouse fire and igniting the ammonium nitrate. A port worker said Warehouse 12 was "not in regular use", and that "those in charge only used to open the warehouse to stack inside it materials confiscated upon judicial orders or perilous products", though he had not seen this to include any armaments.

== Casualties ==
Confirmed casualties of foreign nationals
Nationality	Dead	Injured	Ref.
Syria	43		
Armenia (Lebanese-Armenians)	13		
Bangladesh	5	108	
Philippines	4	42	
Egypt	3		
Belgium	2	4	
Canada	2		
Palestine	2		
France	1	24	
Italy	1	10	
Ethiopia	1	9	
Greece	1	5	
Netherlands	1	5	(Note: The five injured were connected to the Dutch embassy. The Dutch ambassador's wife, Hedwig Waltmans-Molier, was seriously injured and later died of her injuries.)
Pakistan	1	4	
Australia	1		
Germany	1		
United States	1		
Sri Lanka		16	
Jordan		7	
Turkey		6	
India		5	
Sudan		5	
Kenya		3	
Algeria		2	
China		1	
Indonesia		1	
Kazakhstan		1	(Note: The Kazakhstani consul was wounded in his office.)
Morocco		1	
Nigeria		1	
Vietnam		1	

A total of 218 people were confirmed dead from the explosion, with over 7,000 injured. Foreigners from at least 22 countries were among the casualties. (Note: Among the dead were forty-three Syrian, thirteen Armenian, five Bangladeshi, four Filipino, three Egyptian, two Belgian, two Canadian, two Palestinian, one French, one Italian, one Ethiopian, one Greek, one Dutch, one Pakistani, one Australian, one German, and one American national. Among the injured were one hundred and eight Bangladeshi, forty-two Filipino, twenty-four French, fifteen Sri Lankan, ten Italian, nine Ethiopian, seven Jordanian, six Turkish, five Dutch, five Greek, five Indian, five Sudanese, four Belgian, four Pakistani, three Kenyan, two Algerian, one Chinese, one Indonesian, one Kazakhstani, one Moroccan, one Nigerian, one Portuguese and one Vietnamese national.) Several United Nations naval peacekeepers who were members of the UN Interim Force in Lebanon (UNIFIL) were injured by the blast. The United Nations High Commissioner for Refugees (UNHCR) reported that 34 refugees were among the dead and missing, and an additional 124 refugees were injured. At least 150 people were left permanently disabled as a result of the explosion.

=== Notable casualties ===
All ten members of Platoon 5, a team of nine firefighters and a paramedic, died at the scene of the blast. Nazar Najarian, the secretary-general of the Kataeb Party, died after sustaining severe head injuries. French architect Jean-Marc Bonfils died after sustaining serious injuries at his apartment in the East Village building in Mar Mikhaël. He had been live-streaming the fire at the warehouse on Facebook at the time. Lady Cochrane Sursock, philanthropist and member of the Sursock family, died on 31 August from injuries sustained from the blast.

== Damage ==
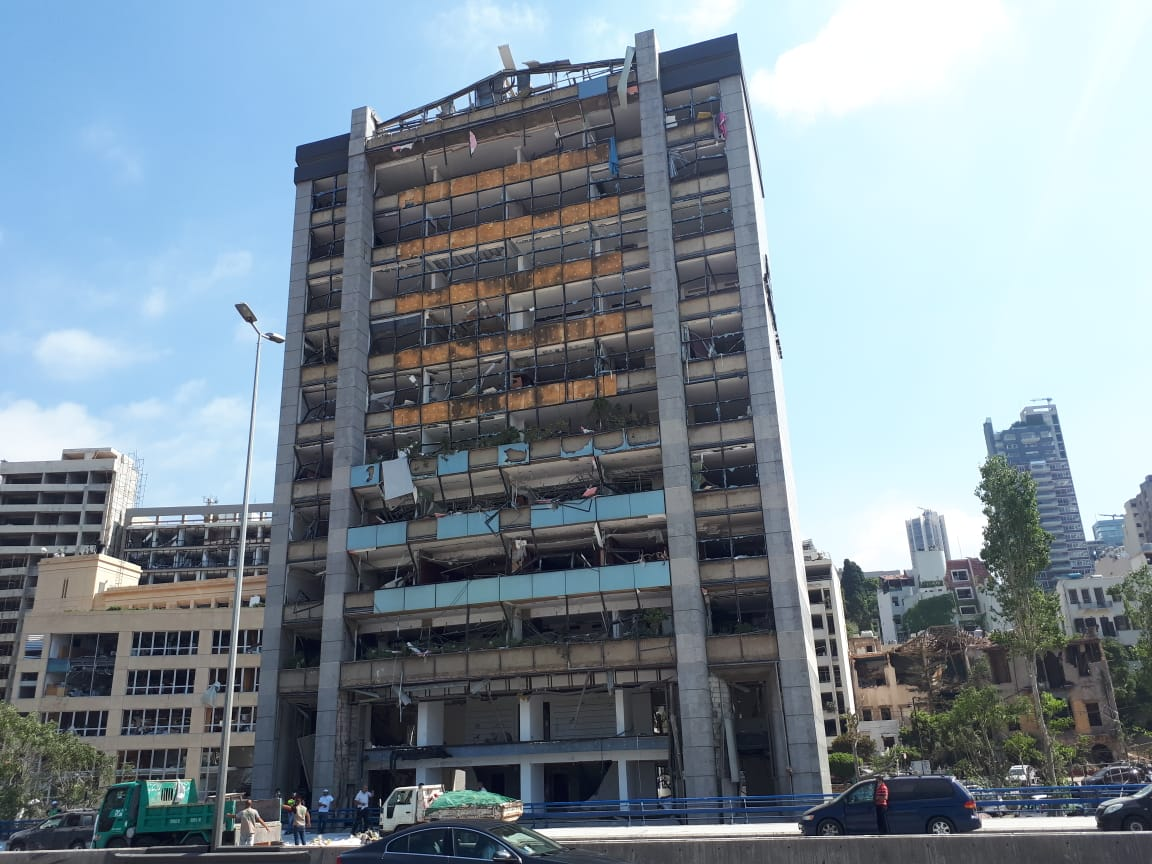
S. Dagher Building, located opposite the port's free zone entrance, suffered extensive damage

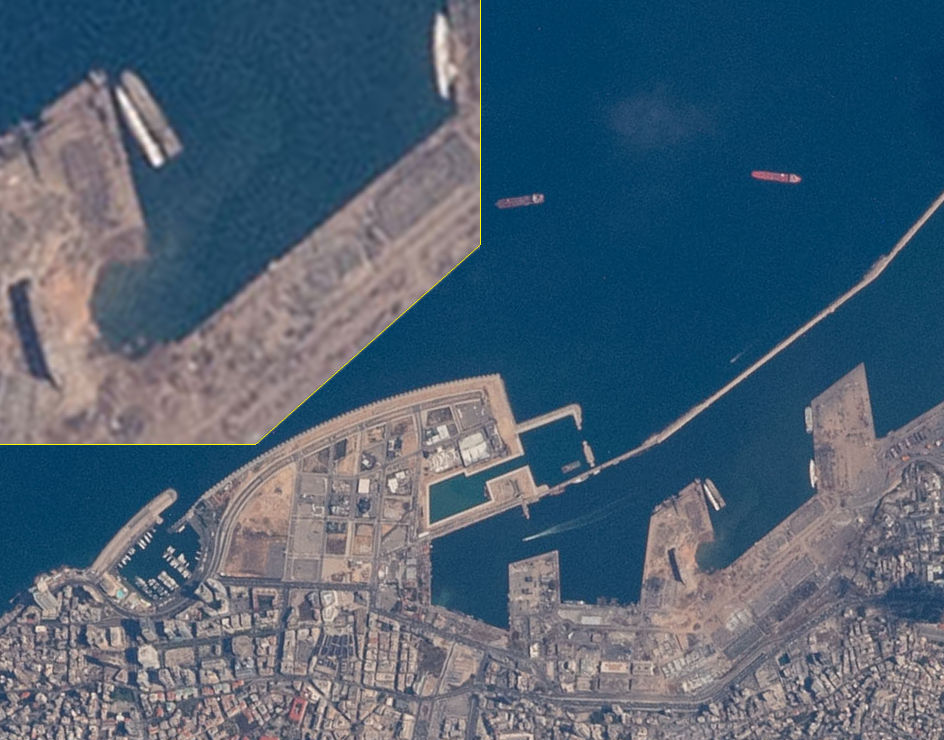
The Port of Beirut as seen from the International Space Station a week after the disaster, with inset of an enlarged view of the explosion crater (top left)

External image
- Detailed 0.5 m satellite imagery of explosion aftermath captured by Pleiades-1B on 5 August 2020.

The explosion overturned cars and stripped steel-framed buildings of their cladding. Within the port area, the explosion destroyed a section of shoreline and left a blast crater roughly 124 m (407 ft) in diameter and 43 m (141 ft) in depth. Homes as far as 10 kilometers (6 miles) away were damaged by the blast, and up to 300,000 people were left homeless by the explosion. The grain elevator was largely destroyed, exacerbating food shortages caused by the COVID-19 pandemic and the financial crisis. About 15,000 tonnes (14,800 long tons; 16,500 short tons) of grain were lost, leaving the country with less than a month's worth of grain in reserve. Part of the elevator's sturdy structure survived, which at the time was credited with shielding a large area of western Beirut from greater destruction. Later research published in Springer Nature suggested that the shielding effect of the silos diminished with distance, with the blast wave intensity largely restored at 450 m. The researchers concluded that the silos' shadowing effect was limited to nearby port structures and part of the Lebanese navy base, which still incurred severe damage. The researchers attributed the lesser impact on western Beirut to its greater distance from the explosion rather than the silos' protective influence.

The damage from the blast affected over half of Beirut, with the likely cost above US$15 billion and insured losses at around US$3 billion. Approximately ninety percent of the city's hotels were damaged and three hospitals completely destroyed, while two more suffered damage. Dozens of injured people brought to nearby hospitals could not be admitted because of the damage to the hospitals. Windows and other installations of glass across the city were shattered.

Saint George Hospital, one of the city's largest medical facilities, was less than 1 kilometer (5/8 mile) from the explosion, and was so badly damaged that staff were forced to treat patients in the street. Four nurses died from the initial blast, 15 patients died after their ventilators stopped working, and several child cancer patients were injured by flying glass. Within hours, after discharging all its patients and sending some to other facilities, Saint George Hospital was forced to close. The hospital's director of intensive care, Dr. Joseph Haddad, was quoted as saying: "There is no Saint George Hospital anymore. It's fallen, it's on the floor ... It's all destroyed. All of it."

The Sursock Museum was severely damaged, as was much of its artwork, and some ceramics were completely destroyed. The atelier for the fashion house Sandra Mansour was heavily damaged by the explosion. Sursock Palace, a 160-year-old Beirut landmark that was listed as a cultural heritage site, also sustained heavy damage, as did its many works of art. (Note: The palace had been restored over a twenty-year period following the civil war of 1975–1990.) Some glass artifacts in the Archaeological Museum of the American University of Beirut were also destroyed, and the huge 118-year-old door which opened onto the main exhibition space was blown off its hinges. Bustros Palace, which hosts the Ministry of Foreign Affairs and Emigrants, was severely damaged. The Armenian Catholicosate in Antelias sustained great damage. All the stained glass windows of the National Evangelical Church were blown out. The FIBA Asia headquarters was also heavily damaged. Embassies in and around Beirut reported varying degrees of damage to their buildings; the embassies of Argentina, Australia, Finland, Cyprus, and the Netherlands, which were close to the blast, sustained heavy damage, while minor damage was reported from the South Korean, Hungarian, Kazakh, Russian, Bulgarian, Romanian, and Turkish embassies.

=== Shipping ===
The cruise ship Orient Queen, berthed near Warehouse 12, suffered extensive damage and capsized overnight. Two members of the crew were killed, and seven crew members were injured. On 7 August, the first lawsuit related to the explosions was filed by the ship's owners, Abou Merhi Cruises, whose offices were also destroyed. The Bangladesh Navy corvette BNS Bijoy, which participated in UNIFIL, was also damaged.

External image
- Abou Karim I on its side next to Abou Karim III, near the blast crater The crater is the water-filled area in the left foreground.

The edible-oil tanker ship Amadeo II, being used as a bunker barge at the port, was nearest to the explosion, which deposited the mangled remains of the ship on a nearby quay. The ship's crew died in the explosion. Two large livestock carriers, Abou Karim I and Abou Karim III, laid up at the end of Berth 09, very close to Warehouse 12, were heavily damaged. Abou Karim I became unstable, keeled over onto the adjacent Abou Karim III and shortly afterwards capsized. The livestock carrier Jouri and the cargo ships Mero Star and Raouf H were also close to the blast and suffered serious damage; AIS from these ships stopped broadcasting at the time of the explosion.

Hapag-Lloyd's offices in Beirut were destroyed. CMA CGM's offices, located a few hundred meters away from the site of the explosion, were severely damaged. One employee died and two were severely injured.

=== Airport ===
Beirut–Rafic Hariri International Airport, the city's main airport, about 10 km (6 mi) from the site of the blast, sustained moderate damage to the terminal buildings during the explosion. Doors and windows were destroyed, and ceiling tiles were shaken loose by the shockwave, severing electrical wires. Despite the damage, flights continued.

=== Subsequent collapses ===
In July 2022, nearly two years after the explosion, grain remaining in the silo caught fire due to a combination of fermentation and summer heat. On 31 July, the northern part of the silo collapsed. Two further collapses occurred in August. The government had ordered the demolition of the silos in April 2022, but families of blast victims objected, saying it should be preserved as a memorial site.

== Investigation ==
The government formed an investigative committee led by Prime Minister Hassan Diab, which announced it would submit its findings to the Council of Ministers of Lebanon by 11 August 2020. The committee includes the justice, interior and defence ministers, and the head of the top four security agencies: the Armed Forces, General Security, Internal Security Forces, and State Security. The investigation was to examine whether the explosion was an accident or due to negligence, and if it was caused by a bomb or another external interference. President Michel Aoun rejected calls for an international probe despite demands from world leaders.

On 5 August, the Council agreed to place 16 Beirut port officials who had overseen storage and security since 2014 under house arrest, overseen by the army, pending the investigation into the explosions. In addition, the general manager of the port, Hassan Koraytem, and the former director general of Lebanon's customs authority, Shafiq Merhi, were arrested. Later, on 17 August, the incumbent director-general of Lebanon's customs authority, Badri Daher, was also arrested. Also, former ministers of both finance and public works were due to be interrogated by a judge appointed by the council. In the meantime, state prosecutor Ghassan Oueidat ordered a travel ban on seven individuals, including Koraytem. While Acting Justice Minister Marie-Claude Najm unsuccessfully demanded an international investigation into the blast, she also noted that "...this case is a chance for the Lebanese judiciary to prove they can do their jobs and win back the confidence of the people". On 19 August, a Lebanon judge ordered the arrests of more suspects over the explosion, making the total number of accused 25.

The Lebanese judge Fadi Sawan, who has been responsible for the investigation, summoned former Minister of Transportation and Public Works Ghazi Aridi, Labor Ministers Ghazi Zaiter, Youssef Fenianos, and Michel Najjar, General Director of the Lebanese State Security Tony Saliba, Director General of Lebanon's Land and Maritime Transport division, Abdul-Hafeez Al-Qaisi, and General Director of General Security, Major General Abbas Ibrahim.

In September, Lebanon's state prosecution asked Interpol to detain two Russian citizens, the captain and the owner of Rhosus, as its cargo of ammonium nitrate was blamed for the explosion. In January 2021, Interpol issued Red Notices (Note: A Red Notice seeks the location and arrest of wanted persons wanted for prosecution or to serve a sentence.) against the two Russians as well as a Portuguese man.

In December 2020, Lebanon's outgoing Prime Minister Diab and three former ministers were charged with negligence over the Beirut port explosion. They were Ali Hassan Khalil, finance minister in 2014, and between 2016 and 2020, and two ministers of public works. Ghazi Zeitar was transport and public works minister in 2014, and followed by Youssef Fenianos between 2016 and the beginning of 2020.

In an interview with Reuters at his home in Damascus on 28 January 2021, Syrian-Russian businessman George Haswani denied any links to the Beirut explosion knew nothing about a company linked to the process of buying a shipment of chemicals that exploded. Haswani said that he had resorted to the Cypriot company Interstatus to register his company, which is the same agent that registered the Savaro company, and that the agent company had moved the registration site of the two companies to the same address on the same day. However, Haswani said that he did not know anything about Savaro and that any links between it and his company are just a coincidence because the two companies have the same agent. As stated in previous reports, Reuters was unable to determine whether Haswani had anything to do with Savaro. Haswani said, "I don't know what other companies are registered by this Cypriot company, five or three or 70 or more... It is a fabricated media whirlwind. We don't know Savaro and we hadn't heard about them before this." Interstatus did not respond to a request for comment. Marina Psyllou, the director of Interstatus, was listed in the registration documents of the company (Savaro) as the only owner and director of the company, but she denied that she was the real manager of the company. She told Reuters in mid-January 2021 that the beneficial owner of the company was another person, whom she refused to identify. She added that Savaro was a dormant company that had never conducted business. Haswani said that he was not contacted by any investigators from Lebanon or any other country regarding the explosion and that he would soon work to file a legal case in Paris against media reports linking him to the explosion. He continued, "I am living my life normally and laughing because I am someone who knows well that I have nothing to do with this matter at all. Why would I worry?"

On 15 April 2021, six detained people were released, including two officers, although they were not allowed to travel out of Lebanon.

In September 2021, the OCCRP published an investigation that linked Savaro Limited to a Ukrainian company trading chemicals, directed by Ukrainian citizen Volodymyr Verbonol. The report also mentioned that only 20 percent of the nitrate originally stored in the warehouse was actually left when it exploded, raising questions about what happened to the rest.

On 14 October 2021, six people were killed and at least 30 injured in a gunfire exchange in Beirut during protests by members of the Shia Amal and Hezbollah outside the Justice Palace, demanding an end to the investigations led by Judge Tarek Bitar, who they deemed too much centered on their political allies.

On 21 November 2021, the BBC reported that legal groups representing victims of the blast had sent letters on three occasions to UN Secretary General Antonio Guterres requesting more information from UNIFIL, but had received no acknowledgment from the UN. A day later, the Lebanese Foreign Minister Abdallah Bouhabib announced that Lebanon had received from Russia satellite images of the port from the day of the blast in 2020. These were the first official images made available by any foreign government.

Throughout 2022 the investigation stalled. As of 8 June, parliamentary immunity, as well as outstanding complaints and other procedural roadblocks initiated by two members of Parliament and former ministers Ali Hassan Khalil and Ghazi Zaiter, continued to prevent significant progress. On 16 January 2025, the investigation was resumed following the nomination of Nawaf Salam as prime minister and the Israel–Hezbollah conflict. Ten people were charged, including security, customs and military personnel.

On 12 May 2025 it was reported that Judge Tarek Bitar was set to issue an indictment on 4 August 2025, coinciding with the disaster's fifth anniversary. It was claimed that he had completed his examination of the ammonium nitrate shipment's origin, entry into the port, and subsequent detonation. He planned to finalise remaining interrogations before releasing the indictment.

In September 2025, Igor Grechushkin, a Russian businessman with Cypriot citizenship, was arrested in Sofia International Airport, Bulgaria, under an Interpol red notice issued by Lebanon, accused of being linked to MV Rhosus. On 10 December 2025, it was reported that a court in Bulgaria rejected Lebanon's extradition request.

In December 2025, the Israel Defense Forces claimed that Hezbollah's assassination squad had targeted Lebanese individuals who linked the organization to the explosion. The assassinated individuals were journalist Lokman Slim, known for his criticism of Hezbollah, photographer Joe Bejjani, who connected Hezbollah to the explosion, the head of customs inspections at Beirut port, Joseph Skaff, and the head of the anti smuggling division of the customs department, Mounir Abou Rjeily. In January 2026, Gracia Azzi was appointed director general of customs by the Lebanese cabinet, sparking criticism for being under investigation for the Beirut port explosion, though supporters emphasized her legal presumption of innocence.

== Relief operations ==
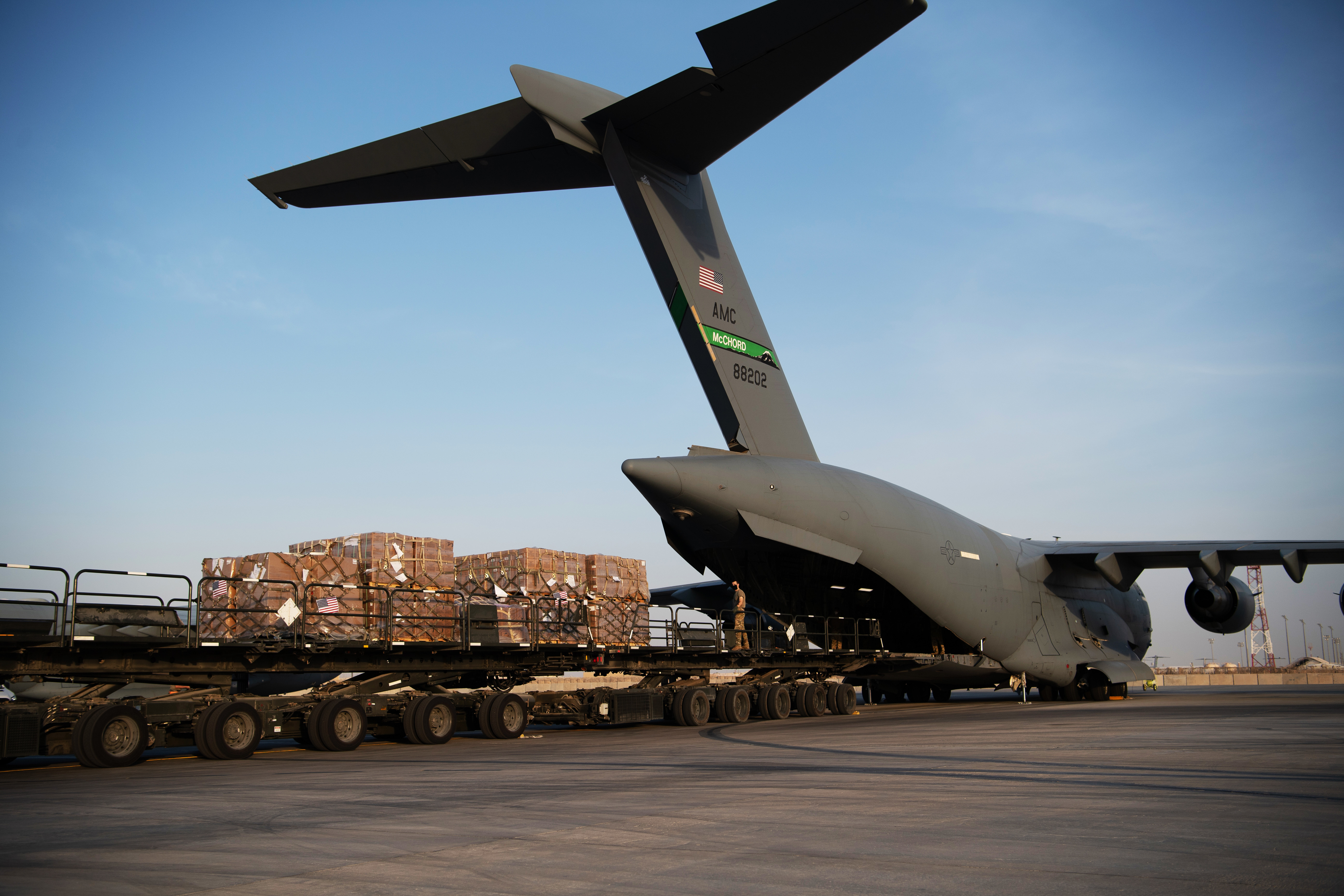
United States Air Force, Medical Services supply

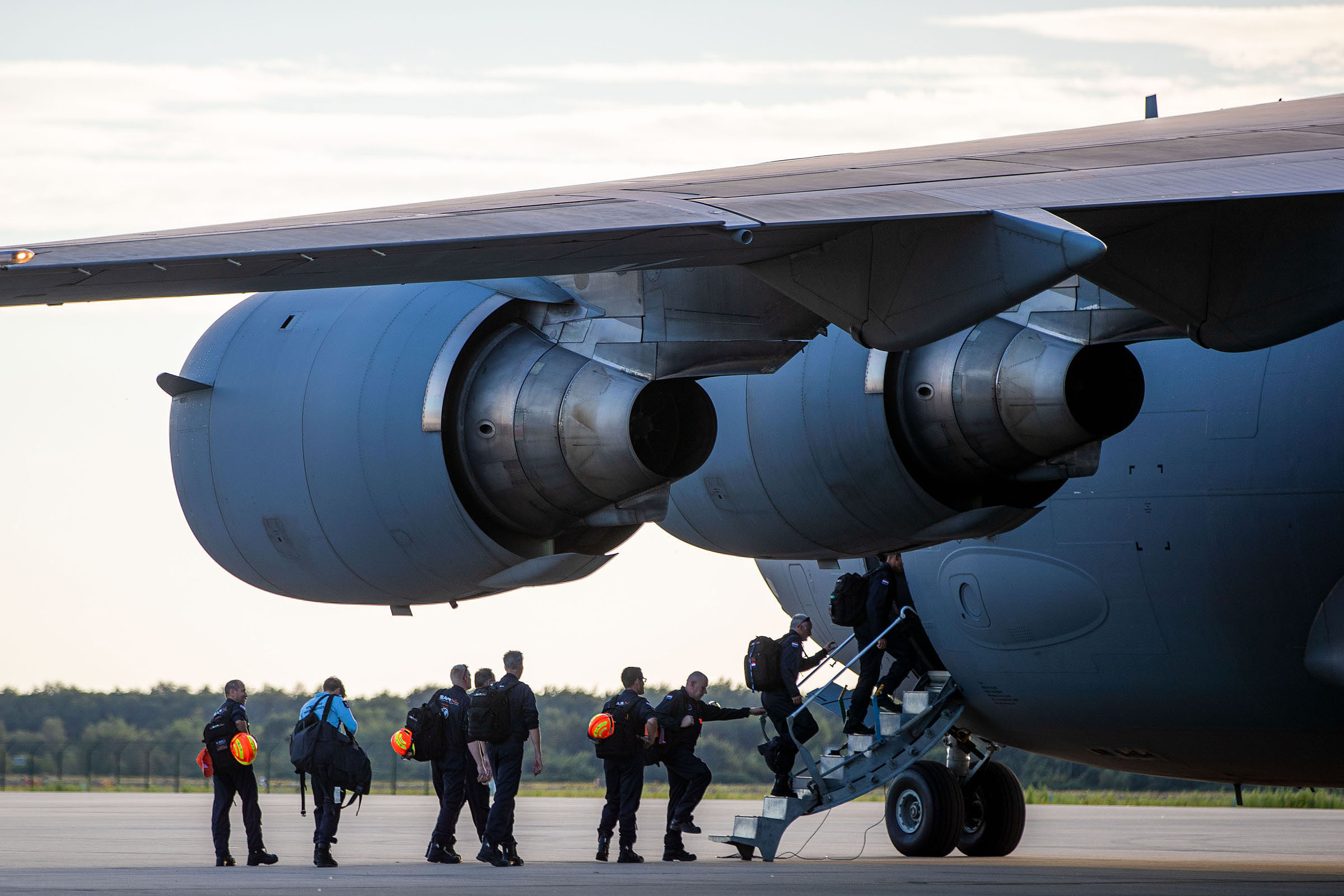
Dutch urban search and rescue team heading to Beirut on 5 August

The Lebanese Red Cross said every available ambulance from North Lebanon, Bekaa, and South Lebanon was being dispatched to Beirut to help patients. According to the agency, a total of 75 ambulances and 375 medics were activated in response to the explosions. Lebanese President Michel Aoun said the government would make up to 100 billion pounds (US$66 million) in aid available to support recovery operations. The ride-sharing app Careem offered free rides to and from hospitals and blood donation centers to anyone willing to donate blood. Volunteers removed debris while local business owners offered to repair damaged buildings for free in the absence of a state-sponsored cleanup operation. A temporary hospital was established in the city by the Iranian Red Crescent Society.

Health Minister Hamad Hasan requested that international aid be sent to Lebanon; a number of countries sent in food, medical supplies, field hospitals, medical workers, and rescue teams. (Note: Countries that sent aid or offered to send aid include: Armenia, Australia, Azerbaijan, Bangladesh, Brazil, Canada, China, Cyprus, Czech Republic, Denmark, France, Germany, Greece, Hungary, Iran, Iraq, Israel, Italy, Jordan, Kuwait, Morocco, Netherlands, Norway, Pakistan, Poland, Qatar, Romania, Russia, Saudi Arabia, Syria, Tunisia, Turkey, United Arab Emirates, United Kingdom, and United States. Intergovernmental organisations which sent aid include the European Union, the United Nations, and the World Health Organization.) On 9 August, a multinational summit hosted by France raised 253 million euros in aid. The money pledged was not to be given to the Lebanese government, but rather to the people of Lebanon through the United Nations, other international organisations, and non-governmental organisations. On 14 August, a $565 million appeal for Lebanon was launched by the United Nations, including initial recovery efforts, as well as immediate humanitarian aid.

In the first week after the explosion, civilians gathered in hundreds to volunteer to clean up the debris on the streets and inside homes and businesses in Gemmayze, Achrafieh, and Karantina neighbourhoods. Many civil society organisations offered equipment and food to the volunteers, while many residents and businesses opened their homes and hotels for free to those who lost their homes in the blast.

UNESCO played a leading role in the rescue and reconstruction of historic buildings, with Blue Shield International assessing the damage to houses, museums and libraries, and the International Council of Museums providing expertise. Blue Shield International, the United Nations Interim Force in Lebanon and the Lebanese Armed Forces put together a project to secure and protect cultural assets. According to Karl von Habsburg, founding president of Blue Shield International, the protection of cultural property in Beirut was not only about securing buildings, but also about preventing looting and water damage, taking dangerous chemical substances into account. The efforts also included the restoration of schools.

On 6 August 2020, the Lebanese Forces Party's executive chairman Samir Geagea was the first politician to visit Beirut and launched from there a relief committee, Ground-0, under the leadership of the former minister Dr. May Chidiac to support in rebuilding Beirut. In December 2020, the committee achieved repairing 709 houses, assisted 5300 individuals and 2300 families, distributed 14000 food rations, made 2540 medical consultations, and provided 2030 individuals with medicine. In addition, the committee distributed more than 150 scholarships for Beirut schools' students.

== Reactions ==
=== Domestic ===
2021 VOA report about the aftermath of the explosion

Prime Minister Hassan Diab announced that 5 August, the day after the explosion, would be a national day of mourning. The Lebanese government declared a two-week state of emergency. President Aoun said the government would provide support to displaced people, and the Ministry of Health would meet the expense of treatment for the wounded. Marwan Abboud, the governor of Beirut, said he arrived at the scene to search for firefighters who were on the site attempting to control the fire that was raging before the second explosion. He broke down in tears on television, calling the event "a national catastrophe". "It resembles to what happened in Japan, in Hiroshima and Nagasaki. That's what [it] reminds me of. In my life, I haven't seen destruction on this scale," he said. Lebanese civilians from every region in Lebanon came to help by offering food, cleaning the streets, and helping NGOs.

Multiple members of the Lebanese parliament resigned in protest, including Marwan Hamadeh, Paula Yacoubian, all three Kataeb Party MPs, Neemat Frem, Michel Moawad, Dima Jamali, and Henri Helou. The Lebanese ambassador to Jordan, Tracy Chamoun, also resigned on live television. On the night of 6 August, the protests against the government that had been ongoing since the previous October resumed, with dozens of protestors near the parliament building calling for the resignation of Lebanese government officials. On 8 August, Diab called for early elections, saying it would be the only way for the country to exit the crisis.

On 9 August, the information minister of Lebanon, Manal Abdel Samad, and then the environment minister, Damianos Kattar, resigned, the first government resignations since the explosion. On 10 August, the justice minister, Marie-Claude Najm, also resigned, followed by the resignation of the entire Lebanese cabinet. Shortly after the resignation of the cabinet, Lebanese Prime Minister Hassan Diab stepped down from office. President Michel Aoun accepted the resignation of the government and the Prime Minister, and asked the government to stay on in a caretaker capacity until a new cabinet is formed.

The Ground-0 Relief Committee, an initiative by the Lebanese Forces Party, launched a petition for an international investigation. The petition was signed by the relatives of the victims and the missing, by the injured as well as by those whose homes, businesses, or establishments have been damaged. The document was sent to the UN Secretary General, Antonio Guterres, through his special coordinator for Lebanon, Ján Kubiš, in order to take the necessary steps to appoint an international commission of inquiry.

The Lebanese Forces Party MPs called for an international investigation into the causes of the double explosion at the port of Beirut on 4 August 2020. They asked the Secretary-General of the United Nations, António Guterres, on 22 February 2021 for the creation of an international commission to be established under the United Nations, which would be responsible for carrying out the investigations. The Members of Parliament, Georges Okais, Imad Wakim, Eddy Abillammaa, and Fady Saad, presented a petition to this effect to the United Nations Special Coordinator in Lebanon, Najat Rochdi.

=== International ===
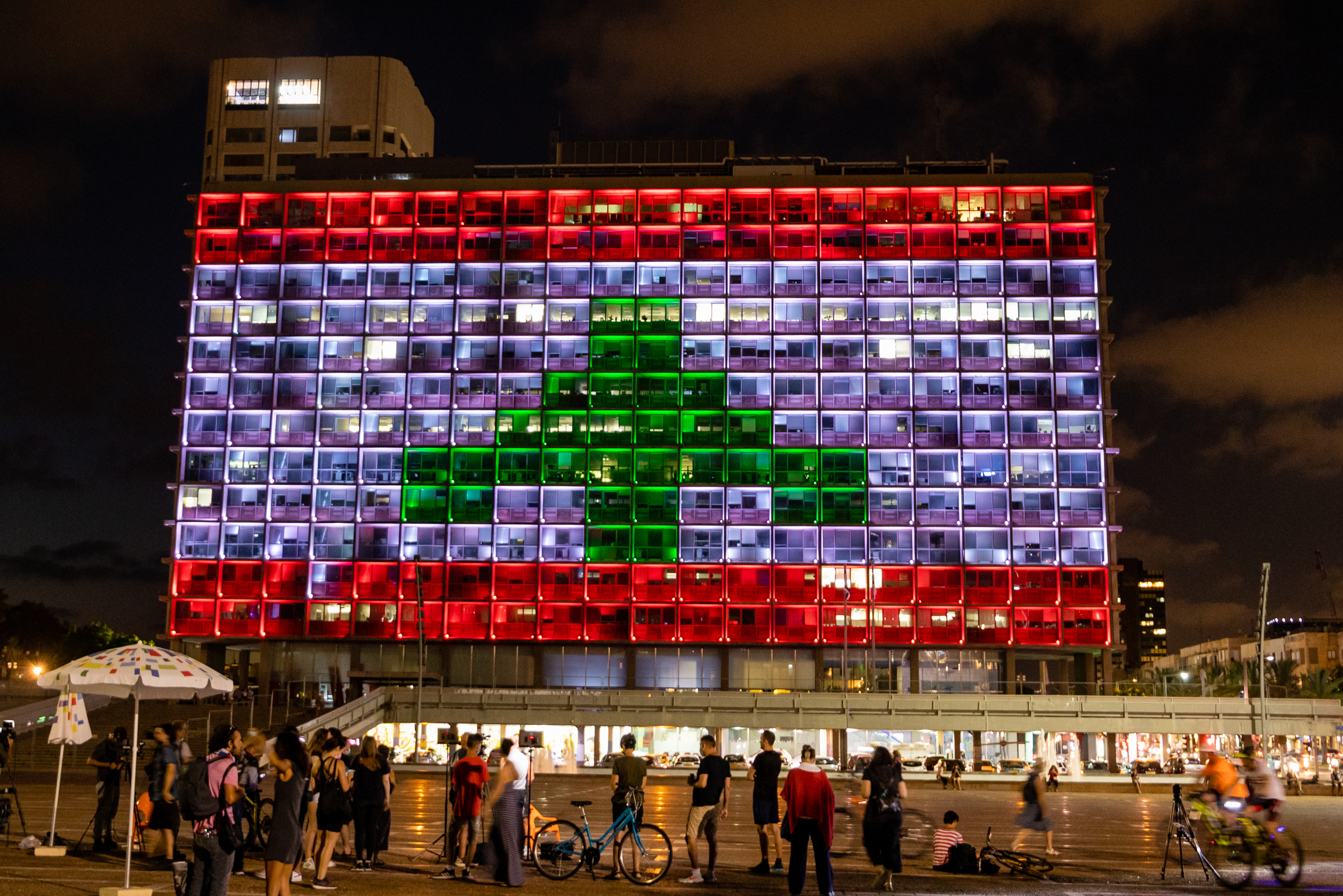
Tel Aviv City Hall, in Israel, lit up with the colours of the Lebanese flag on 5 August 2020

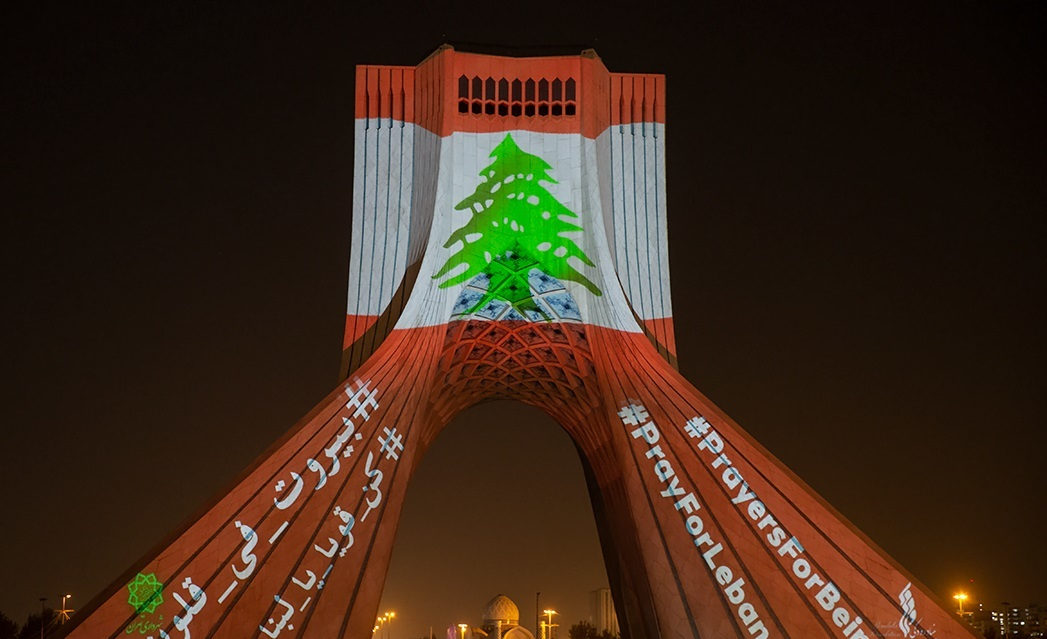
Azadi Tower, in Iran, lit up with the colours of the Lebanese flag on 6 August 2020

Representatives of multiple countries, as well as the United Nations (UN), offered condolences. In addition to those countries which provided aid, others offered to do so. (Note: Sri Lanka donated 1,675 kilos of Ceylon tea to those affected by the Beirut blast; however, the gift was distributed to the families of the soldiers in the Presidential Guard Brigade. In addition, 12 tons of fish donated by Mauritania were not distributed to the public, as the army only mentioned that they "stored it according to public safety standards". Iraq has sent 13,000 tons of wheat/flour to Lebanon; however, 7,000 tons of them were poorly stockpiled in the Camille Chamoun Sports City Stadium.) Notably, Israel offered aid via UN channels, as Israel and Lebanon have no diplomatic ties and are technically at war; the offer was refused by the Lebanese government. Former Israeli Member of Knesset Moshe Feiglin hailed the tragedy as a gift from God, celebrating the incident and describing it as a "spectacular firework show." Despite years of conflict, including the 2006 Lebanon War, both Israel and senior Hezbollah officials ruled out Israeli involvement in the explosion, despite claims and allegations spread via social media. (Note: In the meantime, Die Welt reported, according to the intelligence information, that Hezbollah received a total of 270 tons of ammonium nitrate on 16 July 2013, delivered from Iran to Lebanon. On 23 October of the same year, another 270 tons of ammonium nitrate were delivered, in addition to a third delivery, which made the three deliveries equal to a quantity of 630 to 670 tons of ammonium nitrate. The second delivery was transported by plane, probably by Mahan Air, while the other deliveries were made by sea or land, for example across the Syrian border. Mohammad Qasir who has been responsible for Hezbollah's logistics for 20 years was also responsible for paying for the ammonium nitrate deliveries. In September 2020, the U.S. state department's counterterrorism coordinator, Nathan Sales, mentioned in a video appearance at the American Jewish Committee that: "I can reveal that such [Hezbollah weapons] caches have been moved through Belgium to France, Greece, Italy, Spain and Switzerland. I can also reveal that significant ammonium nitrate caches have been discovered or destroyed in France, Greece, and Italy".)

The International Charter on Space and Major Disasters was activated on 5 August, thus providing for widespread usage of various corporate, national, and international satellite assets on a humanitarian basis. Several countries expressed solidarity by lighting up landmarks and monuments in the colours of the Lebanese flag, including the Tel Aviv City Hall, (Note: Others include the Belfast City Hall, the Burj Khalifa in Dubai, the Great Pyramid near Giza, the King Road Tower in Jeddah, the Kuwait Towers in Kuwait City, the Los Angeles City Hall, the headquarters of the Palestine Broadcasting Corporation in Ramallah, the Sydney Opera House, the Azadi Tower in Tehran, and the National Assembly and Yerevan City Hall in Yerevan.) whereas the Eiffel Tower in Paris went dark at midnight, and the Arab League flew its flag at its headquarters in Cairo at half-mast. Some figures from the right-wing criticised the display of the flag of Lebanon, an "enemy state", in Tel Aviv. There was also backlash inside Lebanon against the Israeli gesture.

Following the explosion, the Netherlands, Turkey, and the United Kingdom sent search and rescue teams. Egypt sent several planes with tons of medical aid and food to Lebanon. The Egyptian embassy also established a field hospital. On 5 August 2020, Qatar started providing urgent medical aid. The Qatar Emiri Air Force delivered field hospitals, respirators, and generators to Beirut. In addition, Qatar's Emir, Sheikh Tamim bin Hamad Al Thani donated US$50 million to Lebanon. On 6 August 2020, Kuwait provided 36 tonnes of urgent humanitarian and medical aid to Lebanon including wheelchairs, blood bags, and 10 ambulances.

As a result of the explosion, concerns were raised about the storage of ammonium nitrate in other ports across the world. Large quantities of the chemical compound were removed from storage in Egypt, India, Romania, and Senegal. (Note: Meanwhile, Iraqi Prime Minister Mustafa Al-Kadhimi ordered the formation of a committee to remove hazardous inventories accumulated at the border ports. Subsequently, hazardous material was removed from storage inside Umm Qasr Port.)

In December 2021, several United Nations offices and other integovernmental organizations held a seminar in follow-up to the explosion. National governments of Lebanon, Estonia, France, South Africa, and others shared lessons learned from the explosion. The seminar called for action to better manage the risks of chemicals in ports.

=== Conspiracy theories ===
Numerous conspiracy theories emerged on social media in the days following the explosion. The main themes were that there was a significant weapons cache belonging to Hezbollah stored at the Port of Beirut, and that Israel wished to destroy those weapons. The theories said that Israel launched an attack and the level of destruction took them by surprise. Israel, Lebanon, and Hezbollah all denied this theory, and blame the ammonium nitrate stored in the port.

== Memorial ==
On 3 August 2025 it was reported that Lebanon's Culture Minister Ghassan Salameh declared the Beirut port silos will be added to the general inventory of historic monuments.

== See also ==
- List of 21st-century explosions
- Largest artificial non-nuclear explosions
- List of industrial disasters
- Halifax Explosion
- Texas City disaster
- 2015 Tianjin explosions
- 2022 Sitakunda fire
- 2025 Port of Shahid Rajaee explosion
