= Cabinet of Hassan Diab =

Former government of Lebanon

- Cabinet of Lebanon

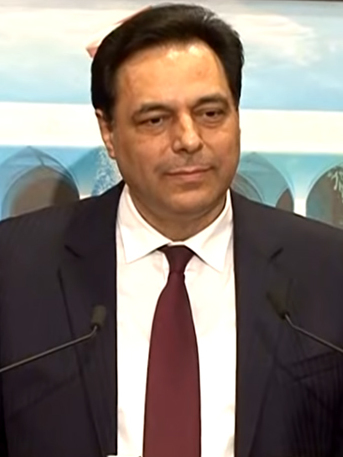
- Hassan Diab
- Date formed: 21 January 2020
- Date dissolved: 10 September 2021

People and organisations
- President: Michel Aoun
- Head of government: Hassan Diab
- Deputy head of government: Zeina Akar
- No. of ministers: 20
- Ministers removed: Nassif Hitti resigned
- Total no. of members: 20
- Opposition party: Future Movement; Lebanese Forces; Progressive Socialist Party; Kataeb Party; Azm Movement; Independence Movement; Popular Nasserite Organization

History
- Predecessor: Third Cabinet of Saad Hariri
- Successor: Third Cabinet of Najib Mikati

A Lebanese cabinet led by Hassan Diab was formed in Lebanon on 21 January 2020, after an agreement was reached by the heads of the involved political parties after nearly three months. Diab was appointed prime minister by president Michel Aoun after Saad Hariri resigned amid the 2019–20 Lebanese protests, that started in October 2019.

The protest movement had demanded an independent and technocratic government, and the incoming Diab cabinet was criticized for appointing ministers who, although they had technical expertise, also had clear political allegiances.

The cabinet, which was composed of twenty ministers, appointed six female members to improve the gender ratio and cited the ratio of male to female members as "more than any previous Lebanese government".

On 10 August 2020, the entire cabinet resigned following public anger over the Beirut port explosion on 4 August that killed more than 200 people. In December of that year, Lebanese judge Fadi Sawan charged Diab alongside three ministers from previous cabinets — Ali Hassan Khalil, Ghazi Zaiter and Youssef Fenianos — with negligence over the explosion. The cabinet continued to govern in a caretaker capacity for 13 months until 10 September 2021, when the third Mikati cabinet was sworn in.

== Composition ==
Lebanese Government of September 2021
Portfolio (ministry)	Minister	Political affiliation	Religious affiliation
Prime Minister Shares (5/20)
Prime Minister	Hassan Diab	Independent	Sunni
Minister of Interior and Municipalities	Mohammad Fahmi	Independent	Sunni
Minister of Telecommunications	Talal Hawat	Independent	Sunni
Minister of Education and Higher Learning	Tarek Majzoub	Independent	Sunni
Minister of Environment	Damianos Kattar	Independent	Maronite
President Michel Aoun and Strong Lebanon Bloc Shares (9/20)
Deputy Prime Minister and Minister of Defense	Zeina Akar	Free Patriotic Movement	Greek Orthodox
Minister of Foreign Affairs and Emigrants	Charbel Wehbe	Free Patriotic Movement	Maronite
Minister of Justice	Marie-Claude Najm	Free Patriotic Movement	Maronite
Minister of Energy and Water	Raymond Ghajar	Free Patriotic Movement	Greek Orthodox
Minister of Economy and Trade	Raoul Nehme	Free Patriotic Movement	Greek Catholic
Minister of Displaced	Ghada Chreim	Free Patriotic Movement	Greek Catholic
Minister of Tourism and Minister of Social Affairs	Ramzi Mcharrafieh	Lebanese Democratic Party	Druze
Minister of Information	Manal Abdel Samad	Lebanese Democratic Party	Druze
Minister of Youth and Sports	Vartine Ohanian	Tashnag Party	Armenian Orthodox
Amal Movement (2/20)
Minister of Finance	Ghazi Wazni	Amal Movement	Shia
Minister of Culture and Minister of Agriculture	Abbas Mortada	Amal Movement	Shia
Loyalty to Resistance Bloc (Hezbollah) (2/20)
Minister of Industry	Imad Hoballah	Hezbollah	Shia
Minister of Public Health	Hamad Hasan	Hezbollah	Shia
National Coalition (2/20)
Minister of Labour	Lamia Yammine	Marada Movement	Maronite
Minister of Public Works and Transport	Michel Najjar	Marada Movement	Greek Orthodox
