= IDM (Internet service provider) =

Internet service provider

- Company type: Private company
- Industry: Telecommunications
- Founded: 1995
- Area served: Lebanon
- Services: Internet and Online Service Providers

IncoNet-Data Management S.A.L. (IDM) is a Lebanese Internet Service Provider (ISP) and is one of the first ISPs to acquire a license in Lebanon. The company was born in 2001, following the merging of two of the country’s leading internet providers: Data Management and Inconet, amid the local and worldwide recession. IDM is also a sister company of Cyberia.

== History ==
Established in 1995.

== Services ==
- ADSL
- 3G
- Dial-up Regular and 56k
- Broadband Corporate (Leased Line and Microwave)
- I-Fly: WiMAX Technology
- IDM MOBI
- IDM Wireless Box
- Wi-Fi HotSpots
- Web Development and Programming
- Security Solutions for Corporate and End-users
- Corporate SMS
- E-marketing

== See also ==
- Cyberia
- Alfa Telecom
- Touch
