= Zeina Akar =

Lebanese politician

Her Excellency Zeina Akar
- زينة عكر
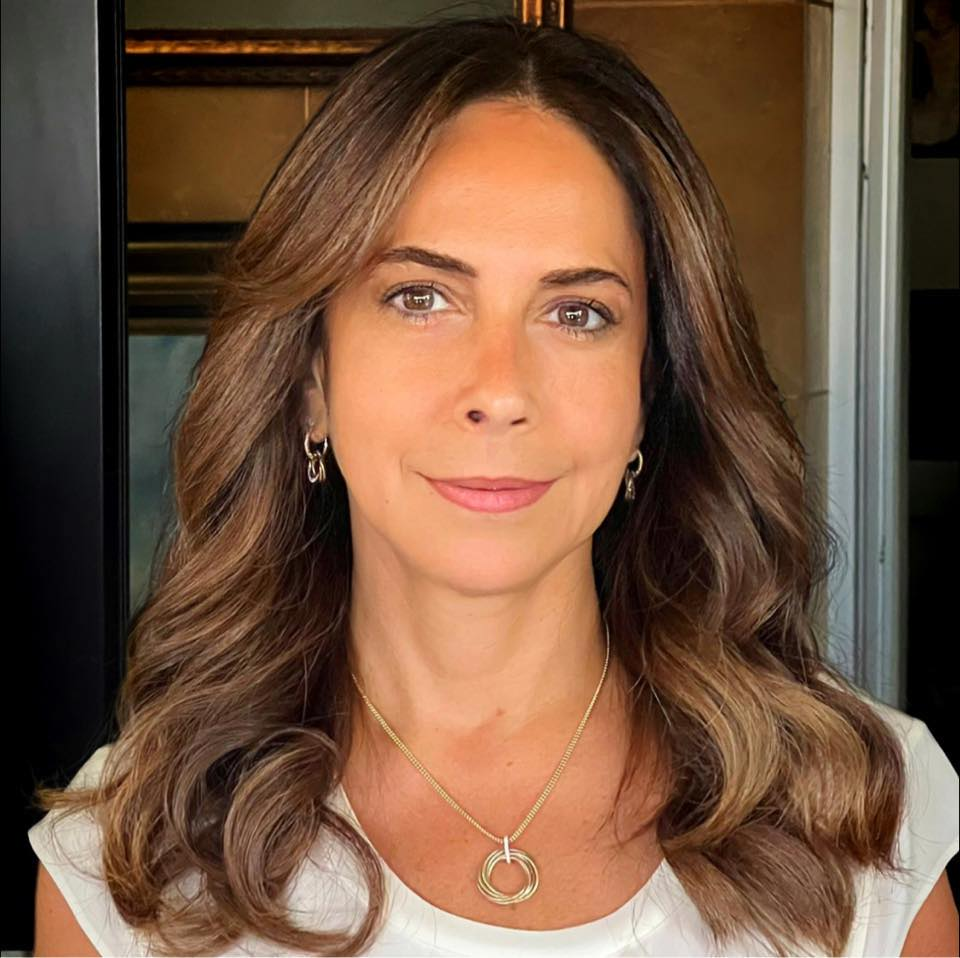
- Akar in 2021

Deputy Prime Minister of Lebanon
- In office 21 January 2020 – 10 September 2021
- President: Michel Aoun
- Prime Minister: Hassan Diab
- Preceded by: Ghassan Hasbani
- Succeeded by: Saadeh Al Shami

Minister of Defence
- In office 21 January 2020 – 10 September 2021
- President: Michel Aoun
- Prime Minister: Hassan Diab
- Preceded by: Elias Bou Saab
- Succeeded by: Maurice Sleem

Acting Minister of Foreign Affairs and Emigrants
- In office Ad interim 19 May 2021 – 10 September 2021
- President: Michel Aoun
- Prime Minister: Hassan Diab
- Preceded by: Charbel Wehbe
- Succeeded by: Abdallah Bou Habib

Personal details
- Born: c. 1964 (age 61–62) Koura, Lebanon
- Party: Independent
- Spouse: Jawad Adra
- Education: Lebanese American University
- Religion: Greek Orthodox

Zeina Akar (née Akar; Arabic: زينة عكر عدرا; born c. 1964) is a Lebanese politician who served as the Defence Minister and Deputy Prime Minister of Lebanon from 21 January 2020 to 10 September 2021. She was the first female defence minister in the Arab world.

== Early life and career ==
Zeina Akar was born in Koura. She has a bachelor's degree in marketing and management from the Lebanese American University. In 1998, she and her husband founded the Social and Cultural Development Association (INMA), a development NGO to provide educational, health and economic services in Kefraya and Lebanon. She was the executive director of the research and consultancy firm "Information International", which she and her husband founded.

== Political career ==
Akar was appointed Defense Minister and Deputy Prime Minister in January 2020, one of six women appointed to the twenty member Cabinet in the new government headed by Prime Minister Hassan Diab. She is the country's first female defence minister, and the first female defence minister in the Arab world. The appointment of the six women to Lebanon's Cabinet was met with "an outpouring amount of comments, memes, and jokes sexualizing and objectifying them". However, this was rectified at a later stage where Zeina Akar was complimented for having outstanding managerial and organizational skills.

Akar has no military or defense background. When asked about her appointment, Diab questioned the need to have specialists for the job. She has been accused of being affiliated with various political parties, but sources denied this saying she has no partisan background and was chosen by President Michel Aoun. The Cabinet as a whole has been called "technocratic".

At the handover ceremony on 23 January 2020, Akar spoke about the right of the people to protest and pressure the government and the government's responsibility to act in the people's best interests. She said her priority was fighting corruption and asked people to watch she would do before judging her. Following the explosion in Beirut on 4 August 2020, Hassan Diab's Government resigned on 10 August. Akar continued to serve as caretaker Minister of National Defense until the formation of a new government in September 2021.

== Personal life ==
Akar is Greek Orthodox. She is married to Jawad Adra, a Sunni businessman who heads one of the country's largest research companies, and built the Nabu Museum with artefacts mostly from his private collection. They were married in Cyprus .

Political offices
Preceded by Ghassan Hasbani	Deputy Prime Minister of Lebanon; 2020–2021	Succeeded by Saadeh Al Shami
Preceded by Elias Bou Saab	Minister of National Defense; 2020–2021	Succeeded by Maurice Sleem
Preceded by Charbel Wehbe	Minister of Foreign Affairs and Emigrants; Acting; 2021	Succeeded by Abdallah Bou Habib
