= Imad Hoballah =

Lebanese politician

Minister of Industry
- In office 21 January 2020 – 10 August 2020
- President: Michel Aoun
- Prime Minister: Hassan Diab

Imad Hoballah is a Lebanese politician. From 21 January to 10 August 2020, he served as Minister of Industry in the cabinet led by Prime Minister Hassan Diab.
