= Lamia Yammine =

Lebanese politician

Minister of Labor
- In office 21 January 2020 – 10 September 2021
- President: Michel Aoun
- Prime Minister: Hassan Diab
- Preceded by: Moustafa Bayram

Personal details
- Born: 1974 (age 51–52)

Lamia Yammine (Arabic: لميا يمين; born 1974) is a Lebanese politician. From 21 January to 10 August 2020, she served as Minister of Labor in the cabinet of Prime Minister Hassan Diab.
