= Alfa (Lebanon) =

Lebanese telecom company

Alfa ألفا

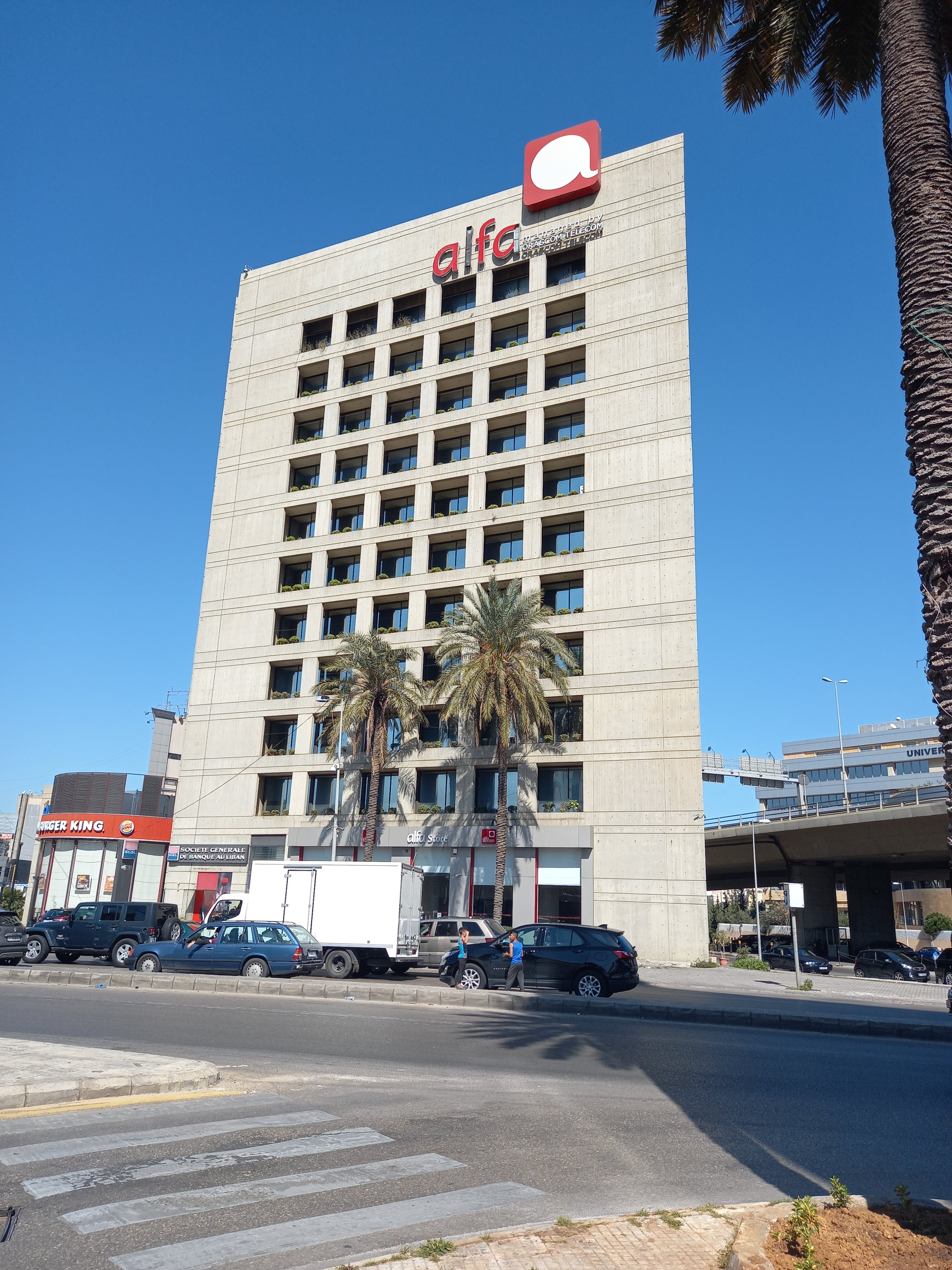
- Alfa headquarter in Furn el Chebbak
- Company type: Private/Public
- Industry: Telecommunications
- Founded: 1994
- Headquarters: Lebanon
- Area served: Lebanon
- Key people: Mr. Jad Nassif (Chairman & CEO)
- Website: www.alfa.com.lb

Alfa (Arabic: ألفا), or Alfa Telecommunications, is a state-owned Lebanese telecom company, founded in 1994, and the only operating GSM networks in Lebanon other than Touch. Previously managed by Orascom TMT, its management had been transferred to the Telecommunications Ministry in 2020.

== History ==
Alfa is the network name for the Mobile Interim Company 1 (MIC1), founded in 1994 under the name of Cellis, managed by France Telecom.

In 2004, the Lebanese government signed a management contract with FAL-DETE to operate the MIC1 network for four years. FAL-DETE renamed the Cellis network as Alfa.

In 2009 Orascom took over management of MIC1.

In March 2010, Marwan Hayek became the CEO of Alfa. In October 2011, Alfa launched Lebanon's first 3G+ technology, and subsequently was also the first operator in Lebanon to introduce 4G-LTE and 4G+ LTE-A technologies.

In 2014, Alfa was reported to have 1.8 million subscribers.

Following the decision by the Lebanese Government to transfer the operations of telecom company to the government. Orascom Telecom and Alfa CEO Marwan Hayek announced on 8 September 2020 the completion of transfer of MIC 1 to the Lebanese government, with the majority of the employees signing a new agreement directly with the government on 8 and 9 September.

Shortly after, caretaker telecommunications minister Talal Hawat announced a new board of director with Jad Nassif as chairman.
