= Raymond Ghajar =

Lebanese politician

Raymond Ghajar PhD

Minister of Energy and Water
- In office 21 January 2020 – 10 September 2021
- President: Michel Aoun
- Prime Minister: Hassan Diab
- Succeeded by: Walid Fayad

Raymond Ghajar is a Lebanese politician. He served as Minister of Energy and Water in the cabinet of Hassan Diab from 21 January 2020 to 10 September 2021. On 10 August 2020, the entire cabinet resigned and will serve in a caretaker capacity until a new government is formed.
