= Marie-Claude Najm =

Lebanese academic and politician

- ماري كلود نجم

Minister of Justice
- In office 21 January 2020 – 10 September 2021
- President: Michel Aoun
- Prime Minister: Hassan Diab
- Preceded by: Albert Serhan
- Succeeded by: Henry Khoury

Personal details
- Born: 6 April 1971 (age 55) Beirut, Lebanon
- Party: Independent
- Spouse: Daniel Kobeh
- Children: 1
- Education: Saint Joseph University; Paris 2 Panthéon-Assas University
- Profession: Lawyer; politician

Marie-Claude Najm (Arabic: ماري كلود نجم; born 6 April 1971) is a Lebanese academic who served as Minister of Justice from 2020 to 2021.

== Education and academic career ==
Najm studied law at the Saint Joseph University in Beirut and continued her studies at the Paris-Panthéon-Assas University from where she also graduated and later earned her PhD.

She taught at the Faculty of Law and Political Sciences of the Saint Joseph University in Beirut and also in France, where she was a visiting professor at the University Panthéon-Assas (Paris II) and the University Panthéon-Sorbonne (Paris I). She is closely related to the Saint Joseph University, where she was the director of the Center for Legal Studies in the Arab World ("CEDROMA") and is currently the Dean of the Faculty of Law as of 2022.

Her publications focus on conflicts of laws and jurisdictions. In 2007 she was a founding member of the “Khalass!", which aimed at finding a peaceful solution to the political deadlock at the time. She was a supporter of the protests in 2019–2020, again a founding member of a civil protest movement and taught law in the revolutionary tents of the Martyrs' Square in Beirut.

== Political career ==
In January 2020, Najm became the Minister of Justice in the cabinet of Prime Minister Hassan Diab. She was one of the six female ministers in the Diab Government counting 20 ministries, which was viewed as a step in the right direction towards gender equality in Lebanon politics. During her tenure she actively supported the adoption of the law on the independence of the judiciary, fought the sectarian allocation of judicial positions, and participated in the drafting and/or adoption of anti-corruption laws and administrative measures as well as laws enhancing human rights. Shortly after the 2020 Beirut explosions, on 10 August 2020, Najm announced her resignation from the government. Najm was the third cabinet minister to step down after the explosions. Her resignation sparked that of the Diab government within hours. Her final act in Diab's government was to commission the Supreme Council of Lebanon, which is the country's top judicial body, to investigate the causes of the disaster, and thereby relieved the Military Tribunal of the task.

== Personal life ==
She is married to Dr. Daniel Kobeh who resides in Bordeaux, France. The couple has a daughter. Najm is a Maronite Christian.
