= Charbel Wehbe =

Lebanese politician and diplomat

- شربل وهبة
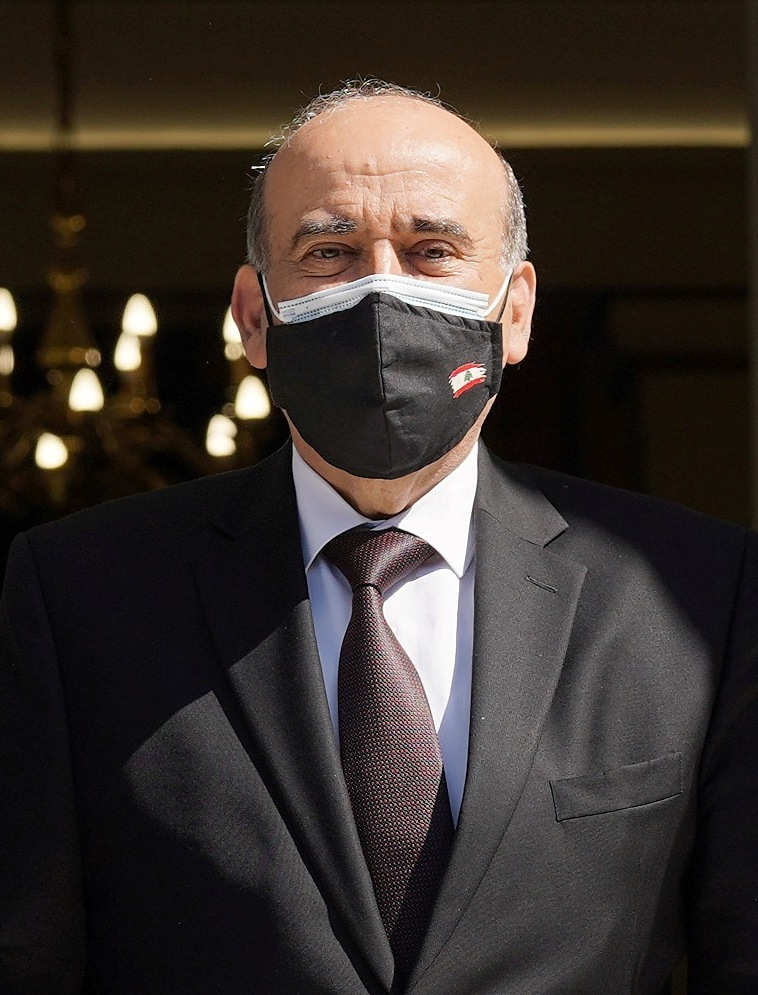
- Wehbe in 2021

Minister of Foreign Affairs and Emigrants
- In office 3 August 2020 – 19 May 2021
- Prime Minister: Hassan Diab
- Preceded by: Nassif Hitti
- Succeeded by: Zeina Akar (ad interim)

Personal details
- Born: 15 July 1953 (age 72) Aqoura, Lebanon
- Spouse: Dolly Rehaim
- Children: 3
- Education: Lebanese University

Charbel Wehbe (Arabic: شربل وهبة; born 15 July 1953 in Aqoura) is a Lebanese politician and diplomat who served as Minister of Foreign Affairs and Emigrants in the Cabinet of Hassan Diab from August 3, 2020, up to his resignation on May 19, 2021. He was appointed after the resignation of Nassif Hitti.

== Career ==
Wehbe who studied Mathematics and Law at the Lebanese University, served as a Consul General in Montreal, Canada (1995–2000), Los Angeles (2002–2007) and an ambassador in Venezuela (2007–2012), in addition to several diplomatic positions in Egypt, Netherlands, Germany and Toronto, Canada.

== Controversy ==
In May 2021, Wehbe had an altercation with Salman Al-Ansari, president of the Saudi Arabia lobby in the United States, on Alhurra TV, in which he blamed Saudi Arabia for the assassination of Jamal Khashoggi, emergence of ISIS in Syria and Iraq, and finally tried to insult his opponent by calling him a nomad, which caused an uproar on social media, and a comment from the Lebanese presidential office, that what he said only represented his personal opinion. However, Saudi Arabia, Bahrain, Kuwait, and the United Arab Emirates summoned the Lebanese ambassadors to their respective countries in retaliation. In the meantime, Wehbe said that he did not mean to offend "brotherly Arab countries". He later submitted his resignation, amid GCC countries' demand for a formal apology.

== Awards ==
- (Venezuela) Order of Francisco de Miranda 1st Class
