= Abbas Mortada =

Lebanese politician (born 1981)

Minister of Culture and Agriculture
- In office 21 January 2020 – 10 August 2020
- President: Michel Aoun
- Prime Minister: Hassan Diab

Personal details
- Born: 1981 (age 44–45)

Abbas Mortada (Arabic: عباس مرتضى;born 1981) is a Lebanese politician. From 21 January to 10 August 2020, he served as Minister of Culture and Agriculture in the cabinet of Hassan Diab.
