= Nassif Hitti =

Lebanese diplomat and politician

- ناصيف حتي
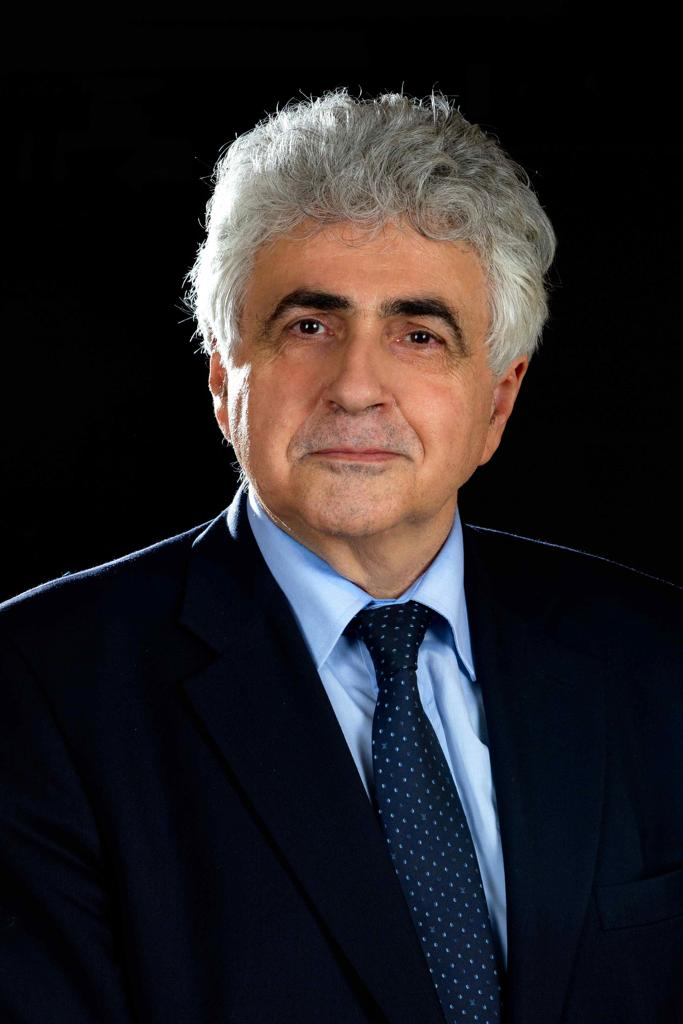
- Nassif Hitti in 2014

Minister of Foreign Affairs and Emigrants
- In office 21 January 2020 – 3 August 2020
- Prime Minister: Hassan Diab
- Preceded by: Gebran Bassil
- Succeeded by: Charbel Wehbe

Personal details
- Born: 22 December 1952 (age 73) Tripoli, Lebanon
- Education: American University of Beirut; University of Southern California

Nassif Youssef Hitti (Arabic: ناصيف يوسف حتي; born 22 December 1952) is a Lebanese diplomat, academic, professor and the former Minister of Foreign Affairs and Emigrants.

== Education ==
Nassif Hitti studied at the College des Frères in Tripoli, and completed his secondary education at the Collège des Frères Maristes Champville, near Beirut.

Nassif Hitti has a bachelor of arts (1975) and master of arts (1977) in political sciences from the American University of Beirut and earned a PhD in International Relations from the University of Southern California in 1980.

== Career ==
Nassif Hitti joined the Arab League in 1981 in Tunis.

From 1985 to 1990, he was posted in Ottawa at the Office of the League of Arab States to Canada.

Between 1991 and 1999, Dr. Hitti served as diplomatic adviser to the Secretary-General of the League of Arab States, in Cairo.

From 1992 to 1999, Dr. Hitti was a part-time professor of International Relations and Middle Eastern Affairs at the American University in Cairo and a member of the editorial board of the Arab League's Arab Affairs magazine.

Dr. Hitti served as Ambassador of the Arab League to France and UNESCO (2000–2013), spokesperson of the Arab League (2013–2014) and Arab League Ambassador to Italy and the Holy See (2014–2015).

Dr. Hitti was the Director of the Higher Institute of Political and Administrative Sciences at the School of Law and Political Sciences of the Holy Spirit University of Kaslik (2016–2019).

Nassif Hitti has been a frequent lecturer at the Mediterranean Academy of Diplomatic Studies in Malta and also at various universities in Europe and the Arab World, as well as research centers.

Nassif Hitti was appointed Minister of Foreign Affairs and Emigrants of Lebanon by Prime Minister Hassan Diab on January 21, 2020. He resigned a few months later on August 3, stating that the country risked becoming a "failed state".

== Publications ==
Dr. Hitti is the author of two books, The Theory of International Relations and The Arab World and the Five Superpowers: Futuristic Study. and of many papers on Arab and international affairs. He has contributed regular articles to numerous newspapers.
