= Nada Boustani Khoury =

Lebanese politician (born 1983)

Nada Boustani Khoury (Arabic: ندى بستاني خوري; born 27 January 1983) is a Lebanese politician. She was born in Ain el-Rihaneh. She was named by the Free Patriotic Movement to serve as Minister of Energy and Water in the cabinet of Saad Hariri on 4 February 2019. She was the first woman to be appointed Minister of Energy and Water.
