= Maurice Sleem =

Lebanese Minister of National Defense

- موريس سليم

Minister of National Defense
- In office 10 September 2021 – 8 February 2025
- President: Michel Aoun; Joseph Aoun
- Prime Minister: Najib Mikati
- Preceded by: Zeina Akar
- Succeeded by: Michel Menassa

Personal details
- Born: February 5, 1954 (age 72) Kfarshima, Lebanon
- Education: United States Army Command and General Staff College; Lebanese University (LLB)
- Profession: Politician; Military officer
- Cabinet: Third Najib Mikati cabinet

Military service
- Allegiance: Lebanon
- Branch/service: Lebanese Ground Forces
- Years of service: 1972–2012
- Rank: Brigadier General
- Commands: Head of Military Medicine
- Battles/wars: Lebanese Civil War; 2007 Lebanon Conflict

Maurice Sleem (Arabic: موريس سليم; born 5 February 1954) is a Lebanese politician and former military officer who served as the Minister of National Defense from 2021 until 2025, under the third government of Najib Mikati.

During his 40-year career, he held key posts and staff assignments in Army operational Units. He also worked at the Lebanese Presidency for many years.

He retired from the Army in 2012.

On 10 August 2023, his vehicle was hit with bullets while he was inside, an incident which was referred to as an assassination attempt by local media. Interior Minister Bassam Mawlawi said security services were investigating the incident to determine whether it was caused by indiscriminate gunfire or an attack.

== Decorations and medals ==
- Lebanese Order of Merit 3rd Grade.
- Lebanese Order of Merit 2nd Grade.
- Lebanese Order of Merit 1st Grade.
- National Order of the Cedar Knight Grade.
- National Order of the Cedar Officer Grade.
- National Order of the Cedar Commander Grade.
- War Order (4).
- Order of the “Dawn of the South”.
- Order of Battle Wounded / Purple Heart.
- Order of National Unity.
- Military Valor Order.
- Order of Fight against Terrorism.
