= Marwan Hayek =

Former CEO of Alfa Telecom (Lebanon)

- Born: 7 September 1969 (age 56); Beirut, Lebanon
- Education: Telecommunications; Electrical Engineering; Management; Finance
- Alma mater: Faculté polytechnique de Mons
- Occupations: Chairman and CEO of Alfa Telecom
- Known for: Orascom Telecom Alfa Telecom

Marwan Hayek is the former chief executive officer of Alfa Telecom in Lebanon.

Born 7 September 1969, Hayek is a telecoms executive and digital economy specialist who was part of the team that built the first GSM network in Lebanon. Marwan has over 18 years experience in the telecom sector across the MENA region.

== Education ==
Hayek holds a master's degree in Telecommunications and Electrical Engineering from the Faculte Polytechnique de Mons in Belgium. He attended and participated in several technical, IT and Management trainings including CCL, MEIRC, HEC, INSEAD, MIT & Harvard.

== Career ==
Hayek started his career with France Telecom in Lebanon – Cellis, known currently as Alfa, where he was part of the initial team that built the first GSM network in Lebanon, before joining later on the Orascom Telecom Holding in 1999. Hayek has held several assignments within the Orascom Telecom Group's subsidiaries and its Holding, the latest before his current appointment was in September 2007, where he joined Mobinil - Egypt as VP Technology in charge of both network and IT infrastructure.

Prior to Mobinil, Hayek was the CTO of Mobilink in Pakistan (an OTH subsidiary) between June 2003 and September 2007. Between 2000 and 2002, Hayek was part of the team who built Sabafon's network in Yemen in the position of CTO. Under Hayek, OTH grew to over 120M subscribers.

Hayek took the helm of Alfa, the first Lebanese mobile operator managed by Orascom Telecom, as its chairman and CEO, since the beginning of March 2010. He led the introduction of the 3G+ technology that was first launched in October 2011 as well as the introduction of 4G-LTE technology in May 2013. The Lebanese internet cable networks do not currently support fibre optics and the introduction of 3G+ followed by 4G-LTE gave access to the Lebanese people to high-speed internet.

Since 1999, following the winning of the Management Agreement of Alfa by Orascom Telecom in February 2009 and in addition to his position at Mobinil, Hayek was appointed on the board of MIC1-Lebanon and Orascom Telecom Lebanon. Since November 2014, he also sits at the board of directors of WIS Telecom (an OTMT international carrier subsidiary operating out of Belgium and Italy).

The mobile penetration rate in Lebanon is close to saturation, indexed at 94% as per beginning year 2016.

== Political Controversy ==
In 2015 there was a controversy where the Governmental Tender Office claimed that Hayek did not submit the tender for the renewal of Alfa's governmental regulated contract on time and the Prime Minister's office disqualified Orascom from taking part in the bidding. The Shura Council cancelled the decision and ordered the Tender Office to endorse the company's application. The council also urged it to conduct a public and equally competitive bid. The telecom operators in Lebanon are government regulated and have to go back to the Minister of Telecommunications whenever they want to invest in the network.

== Awards and recognition ==
Hayek has received several awards in recognition of his contributions to the telecom sector's development in Lebanon and the MENA region. In June 2011, he was awarded the Pan Arab "Telecommunications Man of the Year" title by the "Pan Arab Web Awards Academy". In 2012, he received the "Visionary Entrepreneur Award" at the Business Forum 2012 and he was awarded the "Golden Order of Merit for Leadership" from the "Arab Administrative Development Organization" (ARADO), an affiliate of the League of Arab States, and "Tatweej" Academy.

For contributions to the advancement of Lebanon's digital economy, Hayek was awarded the "Golden Award for Leadership in Digital Economy" from "Tatweej" Academy. He was awarded the "International Hisham Jaroudi Championship" trophy for support of sports development in Lebanon.

== Personal life ==
Hayek is married, with three children and lives in Beirut, Lebanon. He speaks Arabic, English and French.
