= Michel Najjar =

Lebanese politician

Minister of Public Works and Transport
- In office 21 January 2020 – 10 September 2021
- President: Michel Aoun
- Prime Minister: Hassan Diab
- Succeeded by: Ali Hamiyeh

Personal details
- Born: 1970 (age 55–56)
- Education: American University of Beirut (PhD); Oklahoma State University

Michel Najjar (Arabic: ميشال نجار) is a Lebanese politician. From 21 January to 10 August 2020, he served as Minister of Public Works and Transport in the cabinet of Hassan Diab.
