= Hamad Hasan =

Lebanese politician and former health minister

Minister of Health
- In office 21 January 2020 – 10 September 2021
- Prime Minister: Hassan Diab
- Preceded by: Jamil Jabbak
- Succeeded by: Firass Abiad

Personal details
- Born: 1969 (age 56–57) Baalbek, Lebanon
- Education: Moscow Medical Academy

Hamad Ali Hasan (Arabic: حمد علي حسن; (Note: Hamad Hasan (حمد علي حسن) sometimes "Hassan"; transliteration per official biography.) born 1969) is a Lebanese academic and politician who has served as the Minister of Health in the Lebanese government from 21 January 2020 to 10 September 2021.

== Career ==
Hasan earned a masters in pharmacy (1994), a diploma in clinical laboratory sciences (1998), and a doctorate in molecular biology, all from the Moscow Medical Academy (1999). He served as the head of the Medical Laboratory Division of the al Maias Hospital Shtoura from 2000 to 2009. Hasan worked as a lecturer at the Lebanese University and the Lebanese International University from 2003 to 2014.

Hasan has served as a member of the Baalbek Municipality Council since 2010. He was the council's president from 2013 to 2016.
