= Ministry of Energy and Water (Lebanon) =

Government ministry of Lebanon

Lebanese Republic Ministry of Energy and Water

The Ministry of Energy and Water is the government ministry responsible for energy, water, resources, mines and quarries in Lebanon.

== List of Energy and Water ministers ==
Minister	Term of office	
Maurice Sehnaui	2004	2005
Gebran Bassil	2009	2014
Nada Boustani Khouri	4 Feb 2019	21 Jan 2020
Raymond Ghajar (Note: On 10 August 2020, the entire cabinet of Hassan Diab resigned but continued to serve in a caretaker capacity until a new government was formed.)	21 Jan 2020	10 Aug 2020
Walid Fayad (Note: Resigned 30 October 2022, but remained in office as caretaker minister.)	10 Sep 2021	8 Feb 2025
Joe Saddi	8 Feb 2025	Incumbent
