= Issam Naaman =

Lebanese lawyer and politician (born 1942)

Minister of Telecommunications
- In office 1998–2000
- Preceded by: Rafiq Hariri
- Succeeded by: Jean-Louis Cardahi

Member of Parliament
- In office 1992–1996
- Constituency: Beirut, Lebanon

Personal details
- Born: April 2, 1942 (age 84) Sidon, Lebanon
- Citizenship: Lebanon
- Education: Columbia Pacific University
- Occupation: Lawyer, politician, author, lecturer, Member of Parliament, Minister of Telecommunications

Issam Hussein Naaman (born April 2, 1942) is a Lebanese lawyer, politician, author, lecturer, and former Member of Parliament and Minister of Telecommunications.

== Early life and education ==
Naaman was born April 2, 1942, in Sidon, Lebanon to a Druze family. (Note: Lebanon.com gives his year of birth as 1937 instead.) He earned a BA in public administration in 1958, and an MA in political science in 1965, both from American University of Beirut (AUB). He received his Licence en droit (Bachelor of Law) in 1960, and an MA in public law in 1979, both from Lebanese University. In 1984, he completed a PhD in public law from Columbia Pacific University, San Rafael, California.

== Career ==
Naaman has been an Attorney since 1963. From 1975 to 1982, he was a member of the leadership of the Lebanese National Movement. From 1978 to 1988 he was a lecturer at the Faculty of Information, Lebanese University.

In 1992, he was elected to the Lebanese Parliament, and served until he was defeated in the 1996 elections. He served as Minister of Telecommunications in Prime Minister Salim Hoss's cabinet from 1998 to 2000. In 2005, he became a member of the "Third Force Movement".

== Publications ==
Naaman is the author of several books and political articles. His main books are:

- Naaman, Issam (1974). Ruʼyā Jadīdah Lil-qaḍīyah Al-ʻarabīyah رؤيا جديدة للقضية العربية [A New Vision Of The Arab Cause] (in Arabic). Beirut. OCLC 43219301.
- —— (1979). إلى أين يسير لبنان؟ [Whither Lebanon?] (in Arabic). OCLC 404146585.
- —— (1982). al-ʻArab wa-al-nafṭ wa-al-ʻālam العرب والنفط والعالم [Arabs Oil And The World] (in Arabic). OCLC 745120624.
- —— (2001). al-ʻArab ʻalá muftaraq العرب على مفترق [Arabs At Crossroads] (in Arabic). Beirut. OCLC 52443376.
- —— (2003). Hal yataghayyar al-ʻArab? هل يتغير العرب؟ [Do The Arabs Change?] (in Arabic). Beirut. OCLC 61247586.
- —— (2007). Amīrikā wa-al-Islām wa-al-silāḥ al-nawawī أميركا والإسلام والسلاح النووي [America, Islam and Nuclear Weapons] (in Arabic). Beirut. OCLC 122330968.

== Notes ==
Political offices
Preceded by Rafiq Hariri	Minister of Telecommunications (Lebanon); 1998-2000	Succeeded by Jean-Louis Cardahi
