= Firass Abiad =

Lebanese politician and doctor

- فراس الأبيض
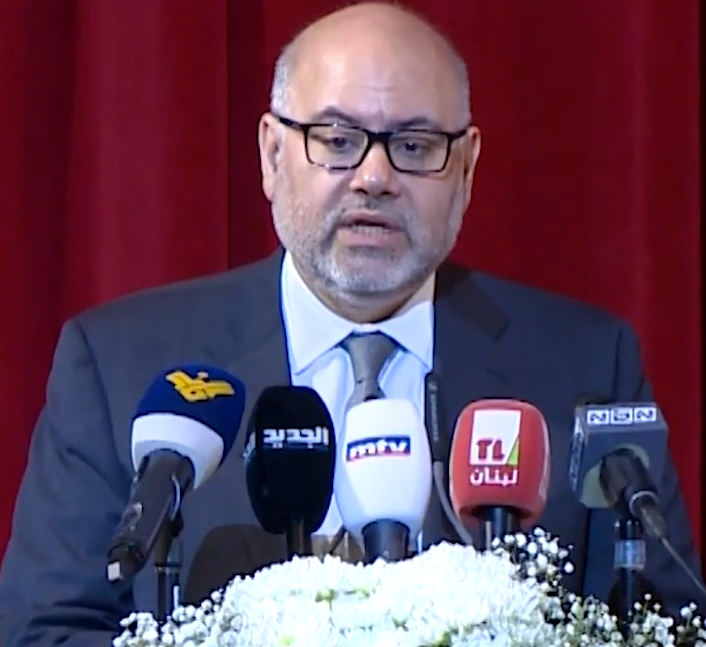
- Abiad during World Health Day in 2023

Minister of Health
- In office 10 September 2021 – 8 February 2025
- Preceded by: Hamad Hasan

Personal details
- Born: 1970 (age 55–56) London, United Kingdom

Firass Abiad (Arabic: فراس الأبيض; born 1970) is a Lebanese politician and medical doctor who served as Minister of Health from 10 September 2021 until 8 February 2025. Abiad emerged as a leading voice of the Lebanese health sector during the outbreak of the COVID-19 pandemic.

== Early life and education ==
Abiad was born in London.

Abiad has pursued an academic career that spans the American University of Beirut, as well as institutions in the United Kingdom and the United States. Abiad holds a medical degree from the American University of Beirut in 1993, and a Master's in Business Administration from the same university in 2013.

== Career ==
Abiad began his career in Saudi Arabia, where he worked for a decade at the Specialized Medical Center Hospital in Riyadh. He returned to Beirut in 2010, becoming a gastrointestinal and bariatric surgeon at the American University of Beirut Medical Center and a professor, a position he still held as of October 2021. He worked as a consultant the General Surgery Department at the Specialized Medical Center Hospital between 2001 and 2011.

In 2015, Abiad was appointed chairman of the board of directors of Rafik Hariri University Hospital (RHUH), Lebanon's largest public hospital. These institutions are often influenced by political factors, with management councils appointed by sectarian parties according to traditional quota-sharing practices. Robert Sacy, head of pediatrics and neonatology at Karantina public hospital, noted that political parties typically appoint individuals to manage government hospitals based on political affiliation rather than qualifications. While some view Abiad as aligned with the Future Movement, led by Saad Hariri, his associates contend that he is an exception in this politicized context. Hariri sought to appoint Abiad as health minister during cabinet formation attempts between October 2020 and July 2021. Mustapha Allouch, vice president of the Future Movement, clarified that Abiad is not politically active and has no formal affiliation with the party, expressing confidence that he would not use his ministry for political ends. Upon taking charge of RHUH in 2015, Abiad faced significant political pressures and a financially distressed institution, with sources close to him noting his commitment to resisting politically motivated hiring. Imad Chokr, a pediatrician at RHUH, emphasized Abiad's independence and ability to make objective decisions.

Abiad gained recognition for his management of the hospital during the COVID-19 pandemic. The hospital was the first in Lebanon to treat COVID-19 patients in the initial four months after the first case was confirmed on February 21, 2020. It became a key reference point in the pandemic, adapting its healthcare capacity as needed. Despite its previous struggles, the hospital achieved a remarkable recovery attributed to Abiad's leadership and support. He actively used social media to inform the public about the pandemic and healthcare crises in Lebanon, earning praise from Georges Dabar, medical affairs director at the private Hôtel-Dieu hospital. L'Orient-Le Jour highlighted that it is unusual for a private institution to recognize a government hospital, which often faces criticism due to resource shortages.

Christophe Martin, former head of the International Committee of the Red Cross delegation in Lebanon, lauded Abiad for successfully leading a partnership between RHUH and the ICRC to support vulnerable populations, including Syrian refugees. Under Abiad, the hospital modernized its facilities and significantly reduced its deficit by 2019, which facilitated a 20 million euro donation from the French Development Agency. However, opinions among staff were mixed. Bassam Akoum, head of the medical personnel committee, criticized Abiad for neglecting employee welfare amid ongoing wage disputes that led to frequent strikes, while acknowledging the hospital's dire condition upon his arrival.

Abiad received the title of "2020's Man of the Year" from the Arab Hospitals Federation (AHF), an independent, non-political NGO composed of nearly 500 members from 22 countries in the region.

In 2021, Abiad assumed the role of Minister of Public Health during a time of severe deterioration in the Lebanese healthcare system, facing challenges such as medicine shortages, a brain drain of qualified personnel, and the ongoing impact of the COVID-19 pandemic.

== Personal life ==
Abiad is married to Ghina Ghaziri, an obstetrician gynecologist at the American University of Beirut Medical Center. He has three children.

He is a Sunni Muslim.
