= Michel Menassa =

Lebanese politician and Minister of Defense

- ميشال منسى
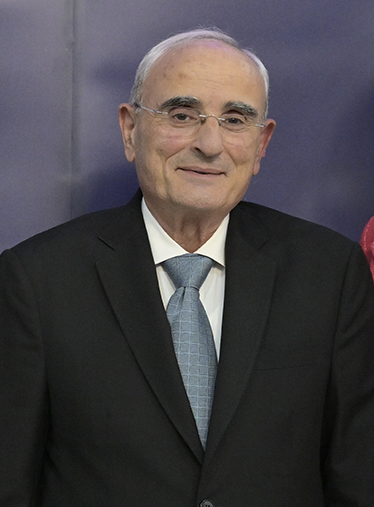
- Menassa in 2025

Minister of National Defense
- Incumbent
- Assumed office 8 February 2025
- President: Joseph Aoun
- Prime Minister: Nawaf Salam
- Preceded by: Maurice Sleem

Personal details
- Born: November 23, 1952 (age 73) Beirut, Lebanon
- Education: Lebanese Army Military Academy
- Cabinet: Cabinet of Nawaf Salam

Military service
- Allegiance: Lebanon
- Branch/service: Lebanese Air Force
- Rank: Major General

Michel Menassa (Arabic: ميشال منسى; born 23 November 1952) is a Lebanese politician and military officer who serves as the Minister of National Defense of Lebanon in the cabinet of Prime Minister Nawaf Salam since February 2025. His appointment followed the election of Joseph Aoun as President of Lebanon on January 9, 2025, and Salam's nomination as Prime Minister on January 13, 2025.

== Biography ==
He was born in Beirut and completed his secondary education there, studying also in France and Italy.

Menassa began his military career, volunteering in the army in 1972 and graduating from the Lebanese Army Military Academy in 1975 with the rank of pilot lieutenant. He held several positions within the Lebanese Air Force, starting as a squadron commander and eventually becoming commander of the Beirut Air Base. He served as head of the Situation Room at the General Directorate of the Presidency of the Republic, within the General Directorate of the Presidency of the Republic, and also as Director of Education in the Army Staff for Operations. Decree No. 13288 was issued on September 6, 2004, promoted him from Brigadier General to Major General rank. Menassa is a retired senior officer of the Lebanese Army, having held various roles within the armed forces. Before retiring, he served as the Inspector General at the Ministry of Defense.

Following his military career, Menassa transitioned to the private sector, particularly in the shipping industry. He has held several positions at CMA CGM Group, including Business Process Manager at CMA BEIRUT TERMINAL CMABT, LTI Manager at Land Transport International LTI and Export Commercial Manager – Sales and Marketing at CMA CGM.

His appointment to the position of Minister of National Defense was seen as a significant shift in Lebanese politics as it represented a potential reduction in Hezbollah's influence and a move towards a more neutral or opposition-aligned leadership. Menassa has been involved in political analysis and commentary on Lebanese affairs. He has discussed the significance of Lebanon's presidential election and its implications for regional politics, particularly regarding Hezbollah and Iran's influence in the country.
