= Talal Hawat =

Lebanese politician

Minister of Telecommunications
- In office 21 January 2020 – 10 September 2021
- President: Michel Aoun
- Prime Minister: Hassan Diab
- Succeeded by: Johnny Corm

Talal Hawat (Arabic: طلال أكرم حواط) is a Lebanese politician. He has served as Minister of Telecommunications in the cabinet of Hassan Diab from 21 January 2020 to 10 September 2021. On 10 August 2020, the entire cabinet resigned and he served in a caretaker capacity until the formation of Najib Mikati’s new government on 10 September 2021.
