= Cyberia (ISP) =

- Company type: Private company
- Industry: Telecommunications
- Founded: 1995
- Headquarters: Beirut, Lebanon
- Key people: Bassam Jaber (CEO) and Ali Zogheib (CCO)
- Website: www.cyberia.net.lb

Cyberia is a West-Asian ISP that was established in 1995 by Transmog Inc. serving branches in Lebanon, Jordan, and Saudi Arabia. Cyberia offers such as:

- ADSL (Asymmetric Digital Subscriber Line): A combination of phone and data signals on a phone line that allows Internet Connection to reach very high speeds.
- Wireless broadband: The transfer of Internet over a certain distance without using electrical conductors or any wires. So, instead of hooking the internet to the computer, the computer can be hooked up with the internet connection.
- Dial-up: Form of an Internet connection that uses fixed phone line.

Fair usage policy is a policy Cyberia uses to ensure that all the subscribers of Cyberia have an enjoyable experience while using the Internet. This policy only applies to shared broadband users. Cyberia will monitor the Internet capacity used by each subscriber during the unlimited period and will apply a speed restriction to the user who exceeds the normal Internet consumption. If this account continues to use high capacity again during the unlimited period, Cyberia will hold the account user liable of breaking the "Fair Usage Policy" and will stop the service either temporarily or permanently without prior notice.

== History ==
In 1996, Cyberia obtained license to offer Internet services to the market, and later that year it became the leading Internet service provider.

In 1998, Cyberia launched a consulting group for the region which made it have a very good infrastructure and thus its launching in Saudi Arabia in 1999

In 1999, Cyberia was given the year's "Best Commercial Internet Solution" award for the Gulf and Middle East from Microsoft Corporation. It was chosen for this special award because of its performance and success in Internet applications development, and for building high and innovative Internet solutions for its consumers.

In July 2003, Cyberia got its hands on INDEX Holdings L.L.C (One of Jordan's top ISP)

== Lebanon ==
After merging with IDM, Cyberia became the largest Internet Service Provider in Lebanon and it owned more than 50 percent market share as of 2011.

== Shareholder's Structure ==
95% Oger Telecom Ltd., 5% Saudi Oger Ltd.
