= Touch (Lebanon) =

- Company type: Private/Public
- Industry: Telecommunications
- Founded: 2004; 22 years ago
- Headquarters: Lebanon
- Area served: Nationwide
- Owner: Government of Lebanon
- Website: https://www.touch.com.lb/

Touch (stylized as touch; formerly mtc touch) is a Lebanese telecom company and one of the two mobile telephony and data operators in Lebanon, alongside its rival Alfa. It is owned by the Lebanese government, and was, until May 2020, operated by the Zain Group.

== History ==
Touch was established in June 2004 by Zain, and contracted by the government to manage one of the country's two existing mobile telecommunications networks. The operation was originally known as 'mtc touch', and was rebranded in June 2012 as Touch.

In November 2012, Touch launched 3G/HSPA+ service in the country, adding 4G LTE mobile broadband services in some areas from May 2013.

In 2019, Touch operated some two million mobile lines in Lebanon, and had a 53% share of the market.

The duopoly market situation of Touch and Alfa has been criticised for high cost of services, with the average Lebanese household spending 5% of their income on mobile services, compared with 1.4% in Egypt, for example.

According to an IFC/World Bank report from 2022, the two mobile operators had approximately 1.5 and 1.7 million subscribers respectively, giving Touch a slight lead.

In May 2020, the Lebanese government took back control of both mobile operators in the country, in preparation for re-tendering the contracts, with the Ministry of Telecommunications operating the service directly in the interim.
