= Lebanese State Security =

Lebanese National Security Agency

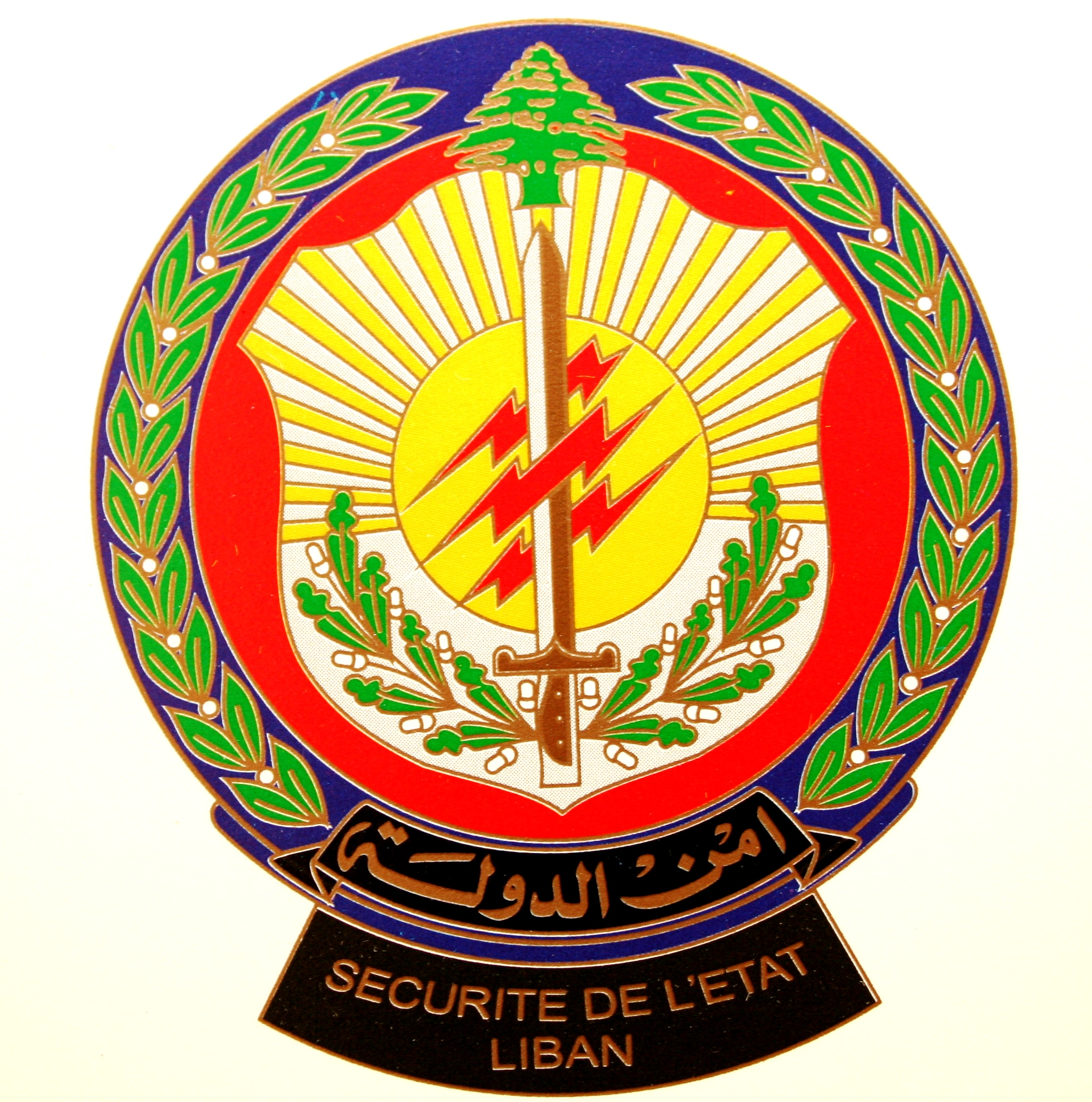

Agency overview
- Jurisdiction: Lebanon
- Headquarters: El Ramleh el Bayda, Beirut
- Employees: Classified
- Annual budget: Classified
- Agency executive: Major General Edgard Lawandos, General Director.
- Parent agency: Lebanese Supreme Council of Defense (President and Prime minister).

The Lebanese State Security or Amn Eddawla (Official name: General Directorate of State Security) (Arabic: المديرية العامة لأمن الدولة) is the national civilian internal security agency of Lebanon tasked with advancing national security through collecting and analyzing intelligence from around the world and conducting clandestine and covert operations, countering hybrid threats, counterintelligence, counterterrorism, and executive protection for high-ranking government officials.

Its director answers directly to both, the President of Lebanon and Prime Minister of Lebanon.

The General Directorate of the Lebanese State Security was established in 1985. In March 2017, General Tony Saliba was appointed as director of the State Security in replacement of George Qaraa. Both are Melkite Greek Catholics as the position is traditionally reserved to the community.

== Functions ==
Major function required by the Agency:

- Collecting information concerning internal state security by the means of special networks covering the Lebanese territories, in order to remit them to the relevant authorities.
- Surveillance of Lebanese parties actions and foreign activists in what concerns state security.
- Counter-espionage and countering enemy activities in its different aspects.
- Preliminary investigations of acts which put at risk internal and external state security.
- Coordinating with other security services, such as the General Directorate of General Security, Internal Security Forces and Army Intelligence Directorate, in matters concerning inquiries and information exchange.
- Setting regular reports in order to inform the Supreme Council of Defense, about general security and political situation, and to make appropriate suggestions in order to face internal and external dangers; to permanently inform the President and the Prime Minister about security and political situation.
- Providing security to some VIP and to competent authorities which are menaced by danger.

== Divisions ==
The Lebanese State Security is mainly divided into several parts:

- The Director General
- The Deputy Director General
- The Office of Director General
- The Planning Division ( شعبة التخطيط والتنظيم )
- Eight Regional Directorates ( مديريات اقليمية )
- The Security Division ( الشعبة الأمنية )
- The Intelligence Gathering Division ( شعبة المعلومات )
- The Public Sector Organizations Security ( فرع أمن المؤسسات )
- The Internal Security Division ( فرع أمن الدولة الداخلي )
- The External Security Division ( فرع أمن الدولة الخارجي )
- the Personnel Division (شعبة العديد)
- The Protection and Response Division (شعبة الحماية و التدخل)
- Along with other sub-divisions.

== Directors ==
- Brigadier General Mustafa Nasser (December 1 1984 - February 17 1988)
- Antoine Traboulsi (17 February 1988 - 17 November 1988)
- Major General Nabil Farhat (17 November 1988 - 21 December 1998)
- Major General Edward Mansour (December 21 1998 - May 5 2005)
- Brigadier General Hassan Fawaz (May 5 2005 - October 10 2010)
- Brigadier Elias Kaikati October (10 2005 - March 20 2010)
- Brigadier General Mustafa Dakroub (March 20 2010 - May 15 2010)
- Major General George Karaa (May 15 2010 - March 08 2017)
- Major General Tony Saliba (March 08 2017 - March 13 2025)
- Major General Edgard Lawandos (March 13 2025 - present)

== See also ==
- Lebanese Armed Forces
- General Security Directorate (Lebanon)
- Internal Security Forces
