= Dima Jamali =

Lebanese academic

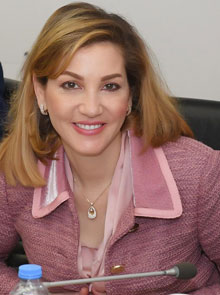
- Prof. Dima JamaliROF, MP
- Education: American University of Beirut; San Jose State University; University of Kent
- Father: Rashid Jamali

Dima Jamali (Arabic: ديما جمالي) is a Lebanese academic and former politician from Tripoli. She is dean of the Adnan Kassar School of Business at the Lebanese American University. Her research is on corporate social responsibility (CSR), sustainability and social entrepreneurship in the Middle East.She founded the UN Global Compact Network Lebanon.

Jamali was elected to the Parliament of Lebanon in 2018 as a Future Movement candidate. The Constitutional Council annulled her election in February 2019, and she won the seat back in a by-election that April. In 2020 she suspended her participation in parliament after taking an academic post in the United Arab Emirates.

== Early Life and Education ==
Jamali is from Tripoli. Her father, Rashid Jamali, was mayor of the city. She has a BA in public administration from the American University of Beirut (AUB), an MA in sociology from San Jose State University and a PhD in Social Policy and Administration from the University of Kent.

== Academic career ==
Jamali joined the AUB faculty in 2002 and taught at its Suliman S. Olayan School of Business, where she became a full professor, held an endowed chair in responsible leadership and served as associate dean. In 2020 she became Dean of the College of Business Administration at the University of Sharjah. She then moved to Canadian University Dubai, where she was dean of the School of Management and later a vice president. In September 2025 she became Dean of the Adnan Kassar School of Business at the Lebanese American University.

== Political Career ==
She received a bachelor of arts degree from the American University of Beirut, a master of arts degree from San Jose State University in the United States, and a PhD in Social Policy and Administration from The University of Kent in the United Kingdom.

In 2002, she returned to AUB as a faculty member, progressing from Assistant Professor to full-time Professor, Endowed Chair, and the Associate Dean of the Faculty of Business.

In 2018, she decided to take a break from academia to work in politics, with which she was familiar since her father Rashid Jamali was the mayor of Tripoli. She became a Member of Parliament, when PM Saad El Hariri approached her to run with him for the 2018 Parliament Elections for the Future Movement.

She explained that she would like to continue her work in academia but shared how, as a politician and MP, returning to the position of a full-time professor would be difficult, stating that she would try to continue contributing to the educational sector, especially with her prominent position at AUB.

Taha Naji, a losing candidate, challenged the result. In February 2019 the Constitutional Council found that ballots from one polling station had been tampered with, judged the remaining margin too narrow to decide the seat, and ordered a by-election. Jamali said there had been "political intervention", and she won the by-election in April 2019. A lawsuit over remarks she made about the council during the campaign was withdrawn in June 2019 after she apologised.

In 2020, she put her position in the Lebanese Parliament on hold for a job opportunity, saying that she regretfully realized that her work in politics was not producing the desired result, and took a position of Dean of the College of Business Administration at the University of Sharjah, in the United Arab Emirates.

== Research ==
Jamali's research deals with corporate social responsibility, sustainability, responsible management and social entrepreneurship. Much of it looks at how CSR is understood and practiced in developing countries and in the Arab world. According to her university profile, she has written or edited ten books and more than 150 international publications.

In 2012 she co-edited CSR in the Middle East: Fresh Perspectives with Yusuf Sidani. The book was published by Palgrave Macmillan.

=== Selected publications ===
- Jamali, D. & Mirshak, R. (2007). "Corporate Social Responsibility (CSR): Theory and Practice in a Developing Country Context." Journal of Business Ethics, 72(3), 243–262.
- Jamali, D. (2008). "A Stakeholder Approach to Corporate Social Responsibility: A Fresh Perspective into Theory and Practice." Journal of Business Ethics, 82(1), 213–231.
- Jamali, D. & Sidani, Y. (eds.) (2012). CSR in the Middle East: Fresh Perspectives. Palgrave Macmillan. ISBN 978-0-230-34821-9.

== UN Global Compact Network Lebanon ==
Jamali founded the UN Global Compact Network Lebanon, which was launched in September 2015 with its secretariat at AUB, and served as its representative and later as its president.

== Awards ==
- Kuwait Prize (43rd edition, 2024), economic and social sciences (management sciences), as a joint winner
- Excellence Award, National Council for Scientific Research, Lebanon (2016)
- Faculty Pioneer Award, Aspen Institute (2015)
- CSR Personality of the Year, Arab Organization for Social Responsibility (2015)
- Eisenhower Fellow (2013)
- Fellowship, British Academy of Management (2007)
- Abdul Hameed Shoman Award for Young Arab Researchers (2011)
- Teaching Excellence Award, American University of Beirut (2006)
- Named in Stanford University's list of the top 2% of scientists in the field of sustainability (2020 and 2021)
