= Ministry of Telecommunications (Lebanon) =

Government ministry of Lebanon

Lebanese Republic Ministry of Telecommunications

Agency overview
- Jurisdiction: Government of Lebanon
- Minister responsible: Charles El Hajj, Minister of Telecommunications
- Website: mpt.gov.lb

The Ministry of Telecommunications is the government ministry responsible for telecommunications in Lebanon.

== List of Telecommunications ministers ==
Minister	Term of office	
Camille Chamoun (Note: Served simultaneously as Minister of Interior and Municipalities.)	25 Sep 1943	03 Jul 1944
Mohamad El Fadil	03 Jul 1944	09 Jan 1945
Nicolas Ghosn	09 Jan 1945	22 Aug 1945
Sami as-Solh (Note: Served simultaneously as Minister of Economy and Trade.)	22 Aug 1945	09 Apr 1946
Philippe Takla	09 Apr 1946	22 May 1946
Youssef El Hrawi	22 May 1946	12 Dec 1946
Majid Arslan	14 Dec 1946	26 Jul 1948
Philippe Takla	26 Jul 1948	01 Oct 1949
Hussein Al Oweini	01 Oct 1949	06 Oct 1949
Jubran Nahas	06 Oct 1949	14 Feb 1951
Edward Noun	14 Feb 1951	07 Jun 1951
Mohamad Safieddine	07 Jun 1951	11 Feb 1952
Hussain El Abdallah	11 Feb 1952	09 Sep 1952
Moussa Mubarak	09 Sep 1952	18 Sep 1952
Nazem Akkari (Note: Served simultaneously as Minister of Public Health.)	18 Sep 1952	30 Sep 1952
Moussa Mubarak (Note: Served simultaneously as Minister of Justice.)	30 Sep 1952	06 Feb 1953
Salim Haidar	06 Feb 1953	30 Apr 1953
Rashid Baydoun	30 Apr 1953	16 Aug 1953
Bashir El Aawar	16 Aug 1953	01 Mar 1954
Nicolas Salem	01 Mar 1954	16 Sep 1954
Salim Haidar	16 Sep 1954	19 Sep 1955
Kazem al-Khalil	19 Sep 1955	19 Mar 1956
Mohamad Sabra	19 Mar 1956	08 Jun 1956
Fouad Ghosn	08 Jun 1956	18 Nov 1956
Majid Arslan	18 Nov 1956	14 Mar 1958
Bashir El Uthman	14 Mar 1958	23 May 1958
Kazem al-Khalil	23 May 1958	24 Sep 1958
Fouad Najjar	24 Sep 1958	14 Oct 1958
Raymond Eddé	14 Oct 1958	07 Oct 1959
Mourice Zouein	07 Oct 1959	14 May 1960
Fouad Najjar	14 May 1960	01 Aug 1960
Suleiman Frangieh	01 Aug 1960	31 Oct 1961
Rene Moawad	31 Oct 1961	20 Feb 1964
Mohamad Kneiio	20 Feb 1964	18 Nov 1964
Antoine Sehnaoui	18 Nov 1964	25 Jul 1965
Joseph Najjar	25 Jul 1965	09 Apr 1966
Kamal Jumblat	09 Apr 1966	06 Dec 1966
Micheal Idah	06 Dec 1966	08 Feb 1968
Rashid Baydoun	08 Feb 1968	11 Apr 1968
Joseph Najjar	11 Apr 1968	12 Oct 1968
Fouad Ghosn	12 Oct 1968	20 Oct 1968
Pierre Gemayel	20 Oct 1968	15 Jan 1969
Michel Murr	15 Jan 1969	25 Nov 1969
Fouad Ghosn	25 Nov 1969	13 Oct 1970
Jamil Kibbi	13 Oct 1970	25 Apr 1973
Tony Franjieh	25 Apr 1973	23 May 1975
Francois Jinadri	23 May 1975	01 Jul 1975
Camille Chamoun (Note: Served simultaneously as Minister of Interior and Municipalities from 1 July 1975 to 9 February 1976.)	01 Jul 1975	15 Sep 1976
Joseph Skaff	15 Sep 1976	09 Dec 1976
Farid Raphaël (Note: Served simultaneously as Minister of Finance.)	12 Dec 1976	16 Jul 1979
Michel Murr	16 Jul 1979	08 Oct 1982
Georges Efram	08 Oct 1982	30 Apr 1984
Pierre Gemayel (Note: Died while in office.)	30 Apr 1984	29 Aug 1984
Joseph El Hachem	29 Aug 1984	22 Sep 1988
Issam Abu Jamra	22 Sep 1988	25 Nov 1989
George Saadeh	25 Nov 1989	31 Oct 1992
Mohamad Ghazirs	31 Oct 1992	25 May 1995
AlFadl Chalak	25 May 1995	07 Nov 1996
Rafiq Hariri	07 Nov 1996	24 Dec 1998
Issam Naaman	24 Dec 1998	26 Oct 2000
Jean-Louis Cardahi	26 Oct 2000	19 Apr 2005
Alain Tabourian	19 Apr 2005	19 Jul 2005
Marwan Hamadé	19 Jul 2005	11 Jul 2008
Gebran Bassil	11 Jul 2008	09 Sep 2009
Charbel Nahas	09 Sep 2009	13 Jun 2011
Nicolas Sehnaoui	13 Jun 2011	15 Feb 2014
Boutros Harb	15 Feb 2014	18 Dec 2016
Jamal Jarrah	18 Dec 2016	31 Jan 2019
Mohammad Shoucair	31 Jan 2019	23 Jan 2020
Talal Hawat (Note: Resigned 10 August 2020, but remained in office as caretaker minister.)	23 Jan 2020	10 Sep 2021
Johnny Corm (Note: Resigned 30 October 2022, but remained in office as caretaker minister.)	10 Sep 2021	08 Feb 2025
Charles El Hajj	08 Feb 2025	Incumbent
