= Hassan Diab =

Prime Minister of Lebanon from 2020 to 2021 (born 1959)

- حَسَّان دِيَاب
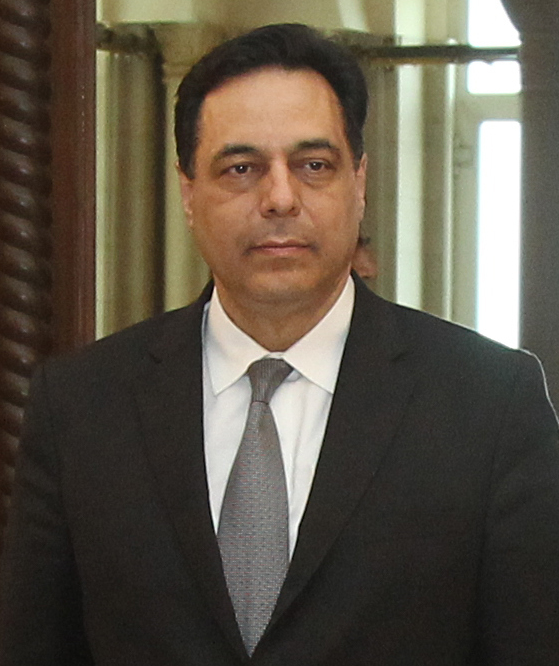
- Diab in 2020

26th Prime Minister of Lebanon
- In office 21 January 2020 – 10 September 2021
- President: Michel Aoun
- Deputy: Zeina Akar
- Preceded by: Saad Hariri
- Succeeded by: Najib Mikati

8th Minister of Education and Higher Learning
- In office 13 June 2011 – 15 February 2014
- President: Michel Suleiman
- Prime Minister: Najib Mikati
- Preceded by: Hasan Mneimneh
- Succeeded by: Elias Abou Saab

Personal details
- Born: 1 June 1959 (age 67) Beirut, Lebanon
- Party: Independent
- Spouse: Nuwar Mawlawi
- Children: 3
- Education: Leeds Metropolitan University; University of Surrey; University of Bath
- Website: hassandiab.com

Hassan Diab (Arabic: حَسَّان دِيَاب, romanized: Hassān Diyāb; born 1 June 1959) is a Lebanese academic, engineer and politician who served as the 26th prime minister of Lebanon from 21 January 2020 to 10 September 2021. He was appointed by President Michel Aoun in 2019 to succeed Saad Hariri as prime minister. He submitted his resignation on 10 August 2020 in wake of the 2020 Beirut explosion and served as caretaker prime minister until Najib Mikati formed a new government on 10 September 2021. Prior to his premiership, he served as the minister of education from June 2011 to February 2014 under President Michel Suleiman.

== Early life and education ==
Diab was born in Beirut on 1 June 1959. He has a bachelor of science degree in communications engineering (with Honors), which he received from Leeds Metropolitan University in 1981. Then he obtained a master's degree in systems engineering (with Distinction) from the University of Surrey in 1982, and a PhD in computer engineering from the University of Bath in 1985.

== Academic career ==
Diab was a career academic, joining the American University of Beirut (AUB) as a computer engineering professor in 1985. He has published over 160 articles and papers in scientific journals and scientific conferences. He was called an advocate for educational reform in Lebanon and authored books on the topic. He also served as vice president for regional external programs at the AUB from October 2006 to June 2011.

On 13 June 2011, Diab was appointed minister of education and higher education as part of Najib Mikati's cabinet, replacing Hasan Mneimneh in the post. Diab's term ended on 15 February 2014, and Elias Abu Saab succeeded him in the post.

== Premiership ==
Diab was designated as the next prime minister succeeding Saad Hariri on 19 December 2019, amidst the protests that had caused Hariri's resignation. Diab's candidacy won the support of 69 members out of 128 of the Lebanese parliament, and his support came from parties that co-form the March 8 Alliance, and received the backing of 26% of Sunni votes.

Diab is an independent, not vocally supporting any political group, and had a low public profile at the time of his appointment.

Lebanon's new government was formed on 21 January 2020 after Diab and Parliament Speaker Nabih Berri met with President Michel Aoun. Diab then announced the new twenty-member cabinet made up of technocrats reporting that they would work on new election law, seeking an independent judiciary and the return of looted public funds. His cabinet included for the first time in the history of the Middle East and North Africa (MENA) region, which comprises 21 Arab countries, 30% women ministers including deputy prime minister, minister of defence, minister of Justice, and minister of labor. During the first session of the new cabinet, Diab made all the ministers sign an attestation that they will not be eligible to submit their nomination for parliamentary elections as well as lifting banking secrecy from their accounts, and announced that his first official visits would be to countries "in the Arab region, especially the Gulf". He said nothing about abiding by the reforms promised by Hariri and chose to maintain the ministry of information, which Hariri had promised to abolish. On 3 February, Diab signed the state budget for 2020, reducing spending by $700 million and on 6 February the cabinet approved a financial rescue plan to present to the parliament.

On 7 March 2020, Diab announced Lebanon would default on a sovereign debt for the first time in its history.

In the wake of the Beirut explosion, the Diab cabinet declared a two-week state of emergency in the Lebanese capital, thus giving the Lebanese military full powers in the city. On Saturday, August 8, mass protests broke out against the government, dramatically escalating as protestors, angry at the Lebanese government for their failure to prevent the disaster (and the general crisis), seized multiple government buildings and clashed with the military. In the evening, in a televised address, Diab declared that Lebanon could not get out of the crisis without early parliamentary elections, echoing the demands of the protestors, and added that on Monday, he would propose to his cabinet a bill to call for early parliamentary polls. Before the Monday, August 10 meeting, five ministers out of the cabinet's twenty tendered their resignation, two less than the seven required by the Lebanese Constitution to force the whole cabinet's resignation, in what was later declared by politicians close to Parliament Speaker Nabih Berri and President Michel Aoun to have been a reaction to Diab's proposed bill. Due to Aoun's refusal to discuss the early elections bill, the meeting took place in the Grand Sérail instead of the Baabda Presidential Palace. Diab tendered his government's resignation that evening.

== Personal life ==
Diab is married to Nuwar Mawlawi and has three children. He is a Sunni Muslim.

== Selected publications ==
- H. B. Diab; I. Demashkieh (1991). "A computer-aided teaching package for microprocessor systems education". IEEE Transactions on Education. 34 (2): 179–183. Bibcode:1991ITEdu..34..179D. doi:10.1109/13.81598.
- J. J. Saade; H. B. Diab (2000). "Defuzzification techniques for fuzzy controllers". IEEE Transactions on Systems, Man, and Cybernetics - Part B: Cybernetics. 30 (1). IEEE: 223–229. doi:10.1109/3477.826965. PMID 18244747.
- Issam Damaj; Hassan Diab (2003). "Performance analysis of linear algebraic functions using reconfigurable computing". The Journal of Supercomputing. 24 (1): 91–107. arXiv:1904.08233. doi:10.1023/A:1020993510939. S2CID 29082745.
- Hassan Diab (2003). "Standardization Related to Arabic Language Use in ICT". United Nations.
- H. B. Diab; Albert Y. Zomaya (2005). Dependable Computing Systems: Paradigms, Performance Issues, and Applications (PDF). Wiley. S2CID 53833099. Archived from the original (PDF) on 6 February 2020.
- Ghazi Ghaith; Hassan Diab (2008). "Determinants of EFL achievement among Arab college-bound learners". Education, Business and Society: Contemporary Middle Eastern Issues. 1 (4): 278–286. doi:10.1108/17537980810929993.
- Ghada Awada; Hassan Diab (2016). "Lebanon's 2011 ICT education reform strategy and action plan: Curriculum success or abeyance". Cogent Education. 3 (1). doi:10.1080/2331186x.2016.1245086.
- Ghada Awada; Hassan B. Diab (2018). "The Effect of Google Earth and Wiki Models on Oral Presentation Skills of University EFL Learners". International Journal of Teaching and Learning in Higher Education. 30 (1): 36–46.

Political offices
Preceded by Saad Hariri	Prime Minister of Lebanon; 2020–2021	Succeeded by Najib Mikati
