= MV Rhosus =

Cargo ship built in 1986, sank in 2018 in Beirut

Coordinates: 33.9059°N 35.5186°E

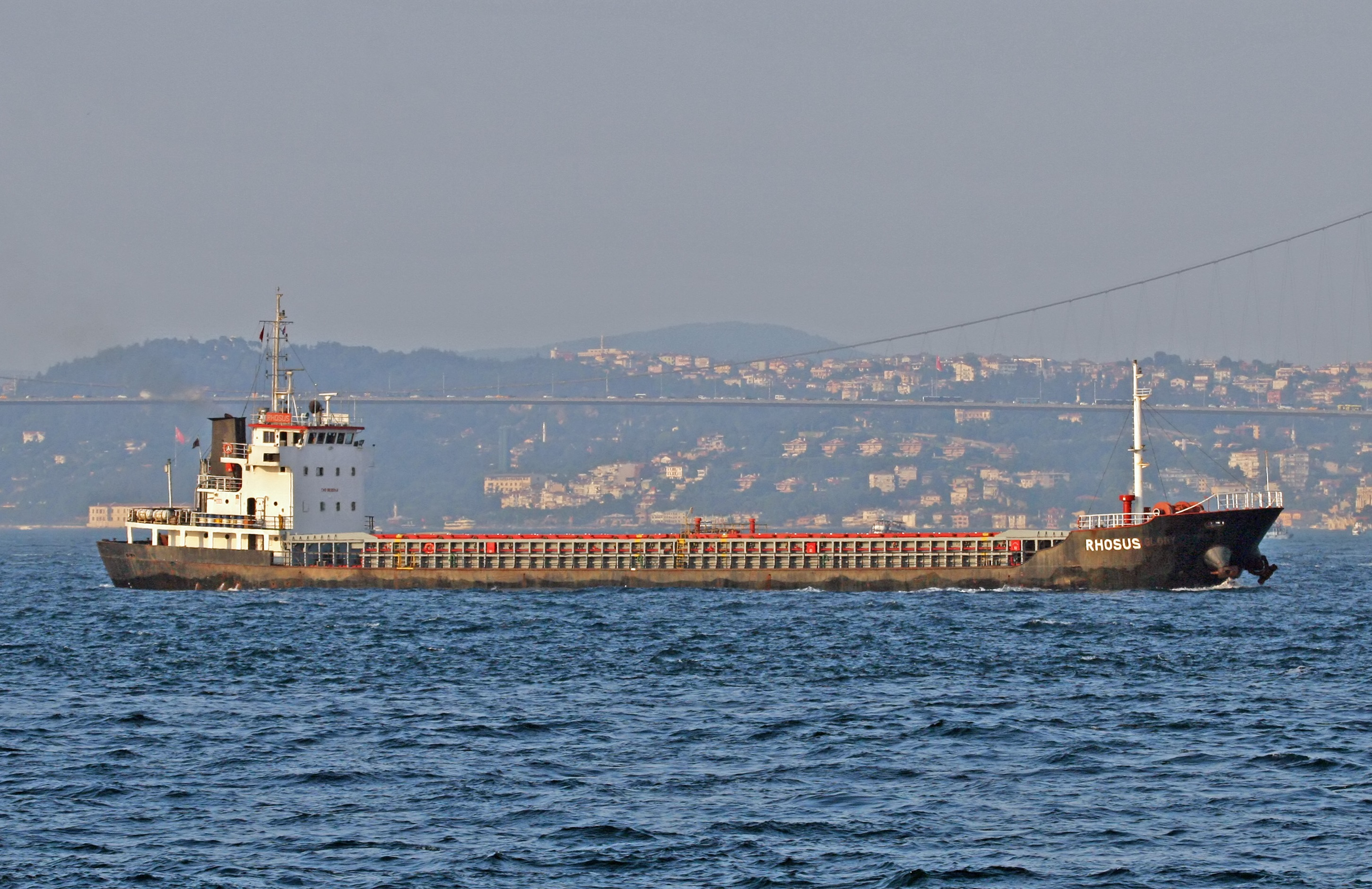
- Rhosus passing Istanbul on 30 July 2011

History
- Name: Daifuku Maru No. 8 (1986–2002); Seokjung No. 505 (2002–2005); Zheng Long (2005–2007); New Legend Glory (2007–2008); Rhosus (2008–2018)
- Owner: Daifuku Kaiun KK (1986–2002); Nishi Nippon Kaiyo (2002); (Unnamed South Korean owner) (2002–2005); Hong Kong Zheng Long Shipping Co Ltd (2005); Rui Hua (HK) Shipping Co Ltd (2005–2007); Sea Star International Shipping Group Inc (2007–2008); Briarwood Corp (from 2008); Igor Grechushkin (2012–2013 or 2014)
- Port of registry: Takamatsu, Kagawa, Japan (1986–1992); Sakaide, Kagawa, Japan (1992–2002); Naruto, Tokushima, Japan (2002); Republic of Korea (2002–2005); Belize City, Belize (2005); Panama City, Panama (2005–2009); Batumi, Georgia (2009–2012); Giurgiulești, Moldova (2012–2018)
- Ordered: October 1984
- Builder: Tokuoka Zosen K.K. (Naruto, Japan)
- Completed: October 1986
- Identification: IMO number: 8630344
- Fate: Abandoned in Beirut with cargo of ammonium nitrate and sank in port in 2018; declared total loss

General characteristics (after conversion)
- Type: General cargo ship
- Tonnage: 1,900 GT; 964 NT; 3,226 DWT
- Length: 86.6 m (284 ft)
- Beam: 12 m (39 ft)
- Draught: 4.9 m (16 ft)
- Depth: 6.2 m (20 ft)
- Installed power: Hanshin 6LU32G; 736 kW (987 hp)
- Propulsion: Single shaft; fixed-pitch propeller
- Speed: 10.5 knots (19.4 km/h; 12.1 mph) (service)
- Capacity: Two cargo holds

MV Rhosus was a general cargo ship that was abandoned in Beirut, Lebanon, after the ship was declared unseaworthy and the charterers lost interest in the cargo. The 2,750 tonnes of ammonium nitrate which the ship was carrying was confiscated and brought to shore in 2014, and later caused the catastrophic 2020 Beirut explosion. The vessel's owner at the time of abandonment was Cyprus-based Russian businessman Igor Grechushkin. The ship sank in the Port of Beirut in 2018.

== Description ==
Rhosus was a single-deck general cargo ship with a length of 86.6 metres (284 ft), beam of 12 metres (39 ft), and draught of 4.9 m (16 ft). The ship's gross tonnage was 1,900; net tonnage 964; and deadweight tonnage 3,226 tonnes, and it had two cargo holds with a grain capacity of 4,136 cubic metres (146,100 cu ft) and bale capacity of 3,837 cubic metres (135,500 cu ft). (Note: "Grain capacity" refers to the cargo capacity for loose bulk cargo; slightly smaller "bale capacity" is used for cargo stowed in bags, bales or bundles and does not include unusable space between frames and girders.) The ship was normally run by around nine or ten crew members. Rhosus's single main diesel engine, a 4-stroke 6LU32G unit manufactured by Hanshin Diesel Works, was rated at 736 kW (987 hp), drove a single fixed pitch propeller, and gave the vessel a service speed of 10.5 knots (19.4 km/h; 12.1 mph).

== History ==
The ship was built by Tokuoka Zosen K.K. in Naruto, Japan, as the grab suction dredger Daifuku Maru No. 8 for the Japanese shipping company Daifuku Kaiun KK and delivered in October 1986. In 2002, the ship was sold to another Japanese shipping company, Nishi Nippon Kaiyo, but was reportedly sold already in March of the same year to a South Korean owner and renamed Seokjung No. 505.

In March 2005, the ship was sold to Hong Kong Zheng Long Shipping Co Ltd, renamed Zheng Long and registered briefly under the Belizean flag. In June of the same year, the ownership changed to another Hong Kong-based shipping company, Rui Hua (HK) Shipping Co Ltd, and the vessel was reflagged to Panama. In June 2007, the ship was sold to a Panamanian-registered company, Sea Star International Shipping Group Inc, and renamed New Legend Glory.

The ship's most recent reported registered owner, Panamanian-registered Briarwood Corp, acquired the vessel in August 2008 and renamed it Rhosus. (Note: The ship's charterer, Teto Shipping Ltd, which was based in the Marshall Islands, was dissolved in 2014.) After lengthening the hull from 53 metres (174 ft) to 86.6 metres (284 ft) and converting the ship to a general cargo vessel, Rhosus was reflagged first to Georgia in 2009 and later to Moldova in 2012. By 2012, the vessel was effectively owned by Cypriot businessman Charalambos Manoli, who sold it that year to Khabarovsk-born Russian businessman Igor Grechushkin, who was reported to be living in Limassol, Cyprus, in 2020. This was Grechushkin's first foray into running his own ship.

On 28 July 2013, Rhosus was detained at the Port of Seville by Spanish port state control authorities due to a number of deficiencies.

=== Abandonment ===
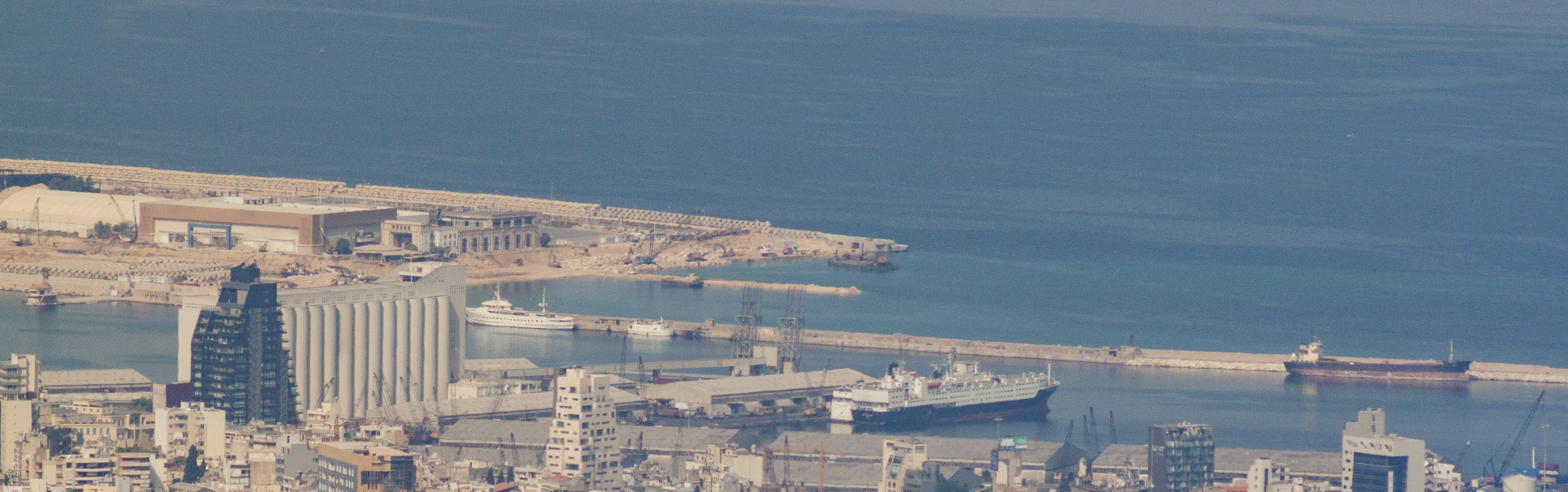
Rhosus (right) moored in the Port of Beirut in 2017

In September 2013, the freighter was chartered to carry a cargo of high-density ammonium nitrate from Georgian fertilizer maker, Rustavi Azot LLC, in Georgia to be delivered to the manufacturer of explosive products Fábrica de Explosivos Moçambique (FEM) in Matola, Mozambique. (Note: FEM ordered the shipment through a trading firm, Savaro Ltd, which has registered companies in London and Ukraine.) On 27 September 2013, Rhosus set sail from Batumi bound to Beira carrying 2,750 tonnes of ammonium nitrate in bags, a cargo which the captain regarded as "dangerous", but not so dangerous that it could not be transported. On 21 November 2013, the ship ported in Beirut. Some sources stated that it was forced to port due to mechanical issues and possibly engine problems, while other sources said that the owner did not have sufficient funds to pay tolls for the Suez Canal and attempted but failed to take on a shipment of heavy machinery from Beirut to Aqaba, Jordan. (Note: Upon arriving in port, it was discovered that the machinery was too heavy for the ship, and the crew refused the shipment.) The heavy machinery was stacked over the hatch leading to the cargo space containing the ammonium nitrate, causing the hatch covers to buckle and damaging the ship.

After inspection by port state control, Rhosus was found unseaworthy, and it was forbidden to set sail. Eight Ukrainians and one Russian were aboard, (Note: One source stated that the crew consisted of eight Ukrainians and two Russians.) and with the help of a Ukrainian consul, five Ukrainians were repatriated, leaving the Russian captain and three Ukrainian crew members—the chief engineer, the third engineer, and the boatswain—to take care of the ship. (Note: However, one source stated that a "Master and four crew members" were left behind.)

The owner of Rhosus, Igor Grechushkin, claimed to have become bankrupt (Note: The captain, Boris Prokoshev, wrote that Grechushkin had told him that he had gone bankrupt, but noted that he did not believe Grechushkin, and did not consider whether Grechushkin was bankrupt important, as what was relevant was that Grechushkin had abandoned the crew, the cargo, and the ship. Prokoshev also stated that he had not been paid for the voyage.) and, after the charterers lost interest in the cargo, he abandoned the ship. Rhosus then quickly ran out of provisions, while the crew were unable to disembark due to immigration restrictions. The captain sold some fuel in the ship in order to pay for lawyers to free them from their confinement on the ship. Creditors also obtained three warrants to arrest the ship. (Note: A ship may be "arrested" and detained in port by a court order in support of a maritime lien claim by creditors against the vessel.)

According to Lloyd's List, the Beirut port authority seized the ship on 4 February 2014, due to US$100,000 in unpaid bills. The ship had accrued port fees and been fined for refusing cargo. Lawyers argued for the crew's repatriation on compassionate grounds, due to the danger posed by the cargo still aboard the ship, and an Urgent Matters judge in Beirut allowed them to return home after having been stuck aboard the ship for about a year. (Note: The Russian captain and other Ukrainian crewmen were released in September 2014, as they were helped by Odesa-based Assol foundation; however, they ended up with $60,000 of unpaid wages.) The dangerous cargo was then brought ashore in 2014 and placed in a building, Hangar 12, at the port, pursuant to a court order, until it exploded, with catastrophic consequences, on 4 August 2020.

=== Fate ===
In a 2020 interview, the former master of Rhosus stated that there was a small hole in the hull and, with no crew on board to periodically pump the sea water out, the vessel sank "two or three years ago" after the cargo had been unloaded. Euronews reported that the records of Lloyd's List showed that Rhosus was seized in February 2014, and that it sank without a crew in the breakwaters of the Port of Beirut in February 2018. The New York Times confirmed via multispectral satellite imagery that the ship sank between 16 and 18 February 2018 alongside a Beirut pier. Subsequent analysis shows the ship to still lie there.

Since 2018, Rhosus's flag has been reported as "unknown" in official databases and the vessel's status was updated to "total loss" in August 2020.

== Investigation ==
A thorough investigation by Der Spiegel and the Organized Crime and Corruption Reporting Project (OCCRP) into the 2020 Beirut explosion concluded that:

- A Cypriot businessman, Charalambos Manoli, might have been the owner, while Igor Grechushkin was merely leasing it through a company in the Marshall Islands called Teto Shipping Ltd.
- Panamanian-registered Briarwood Corp, which owned the vessel in August 2008, might belong to Manoli, according to a 2012 document found by OCCRP journalists.
- A Georgian company called Maritime Lloyd, owned by Manoli, certified the seaworthiness of the ailing freighter in late July 2013. But days later, Port of Seville authorities detained the ship, citing 14 defects, such as corroded decks, lack of auxiliary power, and problems with radio communication.
- During Rhosus's last voyage, Manoli owed €962,000 to FBME Bank, (Note: SeaForce Marine Ltd, owned by Manoli, took a loan in 2012 from FBME Bank to purchase a ship called MV Sakhalin.) which is accused of helping the Shia militant group Hezbollah. However, Rhosus might have been offered up as collateral to the bank at one stage.
- Mozambican company, Fábrica de Explosivos Moçambique (FEM), (Note: FEM's head, Nuno Vieira, has been a business partner of Jacinto Nyusi, the son of Mozambican President Filipe Nyusi, since 2012. Companies such as Mudemol, founded by Vieira and ExploAfrica, co-owned by the Vieira family, were investigated for arms trafficking.) which ordered the shipment, is 95 percent owned by the family of Portuguese businessman Antonio Moura Vieira, through a company called Moura Silva & Filhos, which was previously investigated for arms trafficking and supplying explosives used in the 2004 Madrid train bombings.
- The intermediary company, Savaro Ltd, (Note: Savaro Ltd was filed as dormant at the time of the shipment.) hired a Lebanese lawyer in February 2015 to inspect the quality and quantity of the ammonium nitrate in the port warehouse. The experts reported that 1,900 out of 2,700 bags were ripped and had their contents spilling out. Hence, they did not try to take back the ammonium nitrate in the end.
- One of the warehouse's gates was missing, in addition to a large hole in the south wall, which caused fear that the ammonium nitrate might be stolen to be used as explosives.
- The size of the explosion was equivalent to only 700 to 1,000 tons of ammonium nitrate.

In October 2020, Lebanon's state-run National News Agency said that the country's state prosecution had asked Interpol to detain two Russian citizens, the captain and the owner of Rhosus, as its cargo of ammonium nitrate was blamed for the explosion.

On September 16, 2025 it was reported that Igor Grechushkin was arrested in Sofia, Bulgaria, accused of being linked to the vessel Rhosus. His arrest at Sofia International Airport was made under an Interpol red notice issued by Lebanon, and he is being held for up to 40 days while Bulgarian authorities await Lebanon’s formal extradition request.

On September 25, 2025, Grechushkin had reportedly been transferred to the Republic of Cyprus, where officials will decide whether he will face trial locally or be deported to Lebanon. When asked by the Cyprus Mail how Grechushkin was able to live in and depart from Cyprus without being arrested, Cypriot police explained that Cyprus has no extradition agreement with Lebanon. “Cyprus does not extradite Cypriot citizens to Lebanon,” police said, adding that the Red Notice was issued after Lebanese authorities had turned to Interpol.

On 16 September it was reported that he was arrested in Bulgaria. Following the arrest Lebanon quickly filed a formal extradition request for him.
