= Sąd okręgowy =

Judiciary instance in Poland

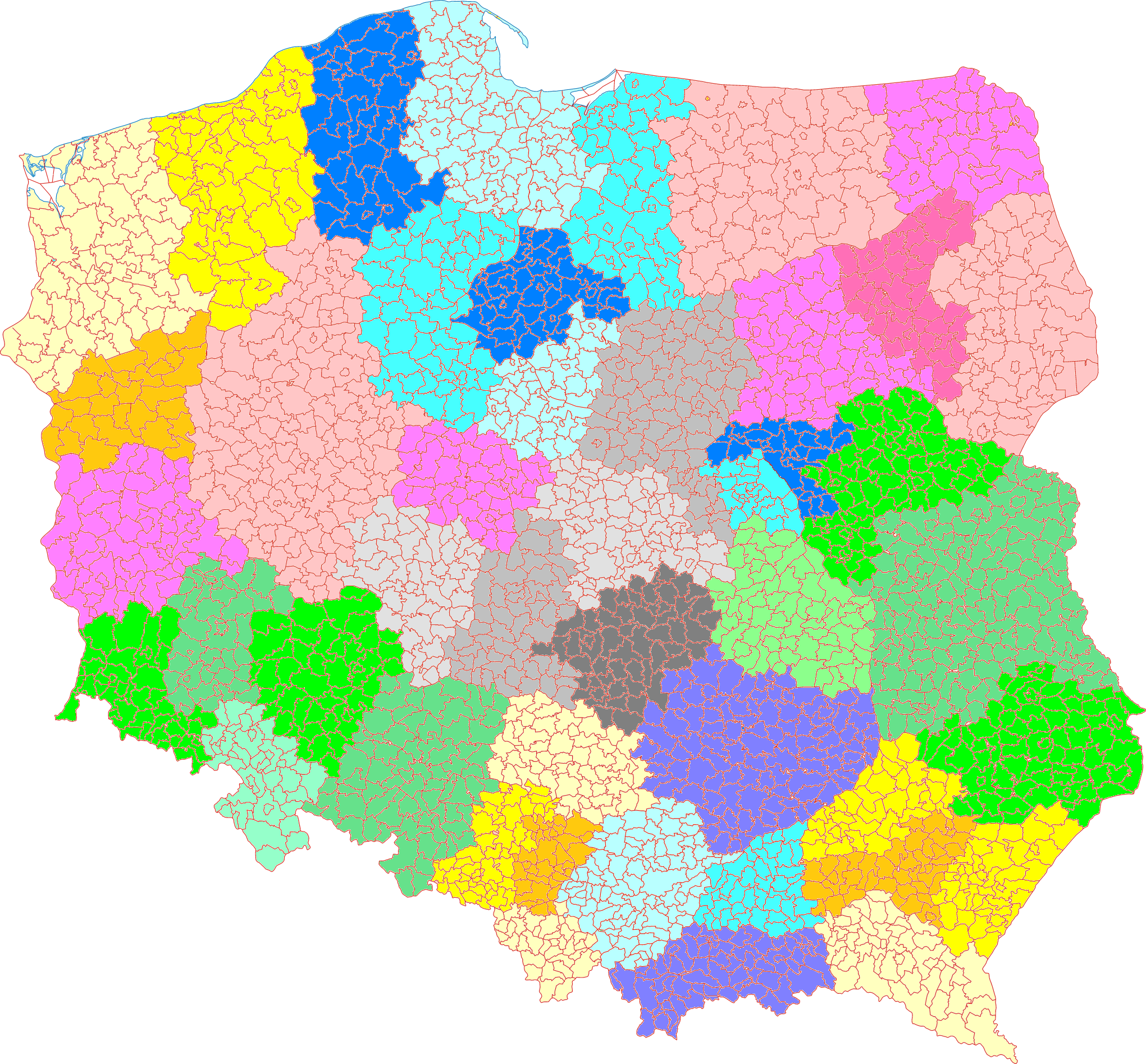
Map of the territorial jurisdiction of district courts in Poland (as of December 16, 2017).

A district court (Polish: sąd okręgowy) is a type of common court in Poland and ranks higher in the judicial hierarchy than the sąd rejonowy. There are currently 47 district courts, located mainly in larger cities; the most recent one, in Sosnowiec, opened on 1 April 2022. Warsaw is the only city divided between two circuit courts (Warsaw and Warsaw-Praga district courts). In 2020, district courts heard an estimated 808,600 cases.

The district court serves both as a court of original jurisdiction and appellate jurisdiction. As an appellate court. it hears appeals from the sąd rejonowy courts within its territory (known as okręg), There is also a specified catalogue of cases where the court has original jurisdiction, which includes:

- lawsuits claiming more than 100,000 PLN of worth, except for those concerning alimony, infringement on rights of possession, separation of property during divorces, challenging a land and mortgage register entry, or those filed using a simplified procedure of the electronic writ of payment (elektroniczne postępowanie upominawcze);
- lawsuits concerning personal rights (e.g. personality rights, right to privacy, defamation and freedom of conscience cases), except for parenthood and adoption cases;
- intellectual property lawsuits (by selected courts);
- maritime code lawsuits (by selected courts);
- indictments related to civil aviation accidents and serious incidents (by selected courts);
- press law lawsuits (but not indictments) concerning all media outlets; applications and complaints related to press outlets other than those covered by the broadcasting act, including their registration;
- personal data protection law lawsuits (but not indictments);
- complaints challenging the split of a cooperative;
- complaints challenging the existence, legality or legal effect of resolutions of legal persons and other entities with legal capacity;
- complaints against the rulings of the National Appeals Chamber which is a central quasi-judicial body established to review challenged outcomes of public procurement proceedings, primarily tenders (by selected courts);
- applications claiming damages for the effects of a legally valid and binding (i.e. non-appealable) court verdict;
- applications and complaints concerning incapacitation of a person;
- applications and complaints concerning imposition or termination of legal separation in a marriage;
- applications for authorization of telecommunications, postal or Internet data surveillance;
- charges of submitting a false declaration with regard to lustration;
- indictments for serious crimes, including all crimes that carry a punishment of at least 3 years of imprisonment or more (zbrodnie or felonies); and selected other crimes (występki or misdemeanours) as specified in Article 25 of the Code of criminal procedure;
- civil lawsuits referred from a sąd rejonowy for trial in a circuit court (may be remanded to sąd rejonowy, with justification), and criminal cases referred by the appeal court on a request of a sąd rejonowy (may not be remanded)

The district courts always include a criminal and a civil division (typically two for each type, one for first-instance cases, and another one designated as an appellate division; nevertheless, an appellate section within a single division may be formed as an alternative instead, in the case of smaller courts). as well as a labour and social insurance division; some may additionally have a commercial division as well as an inspection division (wydział wizytacyjny) tasked with administrative auditing and oversight of the subordinate courts; a penitentiary division for cases related to prisons, an execution division with similar roles to sąd rejonowy court's enforcement division, and others according to the court's needs as determined by the minister of justice.

All of these courts are responsible along with their military counterparts for issuing European arrest warrants, either on own initiative or on a request of a subordinate court), as well as for maintaining the registry of press outlets, which is obligatory for all Polish printed or electronic periodical media outlets other than those licensed or listed under the broadcasting act by the National Broadcasting Council, in order for them to legally publish.. They are also responsible for maintaining lists of available expert witnesses in various fields, as well as of physicians enrolled as court physicians, holding exclusive specific authorization to issue recognized sick-leave certificates excusing for absence in court proceedings, mandatory for the trial participants (including the defendant or the parties to a civil litigation, their legal representation, as well as the subpoenaed witnesses), an institution introduced in order to limit the previously widespread abuse aimed at obstructing justice.

In a few cases, selected district courts are assigned exclusive jurisdiction over specialist matters. Five courts, in Gdańsk, Katowice, Lublin, Poznań and Warsaw, have special intellectual property divisions, with a catalogue of selected IP lawsuits (including all related to patented inventions, protected integrated circuits or utility models, as well as plant varieties protected by plant breeders' rights) heard exclusively by the Warsaw court. The Warsaw district court also includes a special division for telecommunications, postal or internet data surveillance, entrusted with reviewing surveillance authorization requests filed by the uniformed services. It is also the only district court adjudicating on indictments related to civil aviation accidents and serious incidents, competition law complaints or public procurement law complaints, and is the only court responsible for maintaining the registers of political parties, investment funds and pension funds. All lawsuits based on the Polish maritime code are heard in first instance exclusively by the Gdańsk district court.

The Szczecin and Gdańsk district courts also have affiliated quasi-judicial bodies named maritime chambers (in Szczecin and in Gdynia, respectively) maintaining the Registry of Ships (Polish: rejestr okrętowy) containing entries on all ships of the Polish international merchant marine, as well as on rights and liabilities related to them (ship mortgage, maritime liens; they also hear disciplinary maritime law charges against shipowners, ship captains, other ship crew members, maritime pilots etc. in cases of maritime accidents; their rulings in this capacity may be appealed to a single Second-Instance Maritime Chamber in Gdynia (also affiliated to the sąd okręgowy in Gdańsk), whose rulings may in turn be appealed to the Gdańsk appeal court (criminal division, specifically).

== See also ==
- Judiciary of Poland
