= Statue of Władysław Bartoszewski (Warsaw) =

Monument in Warsaw, Poland

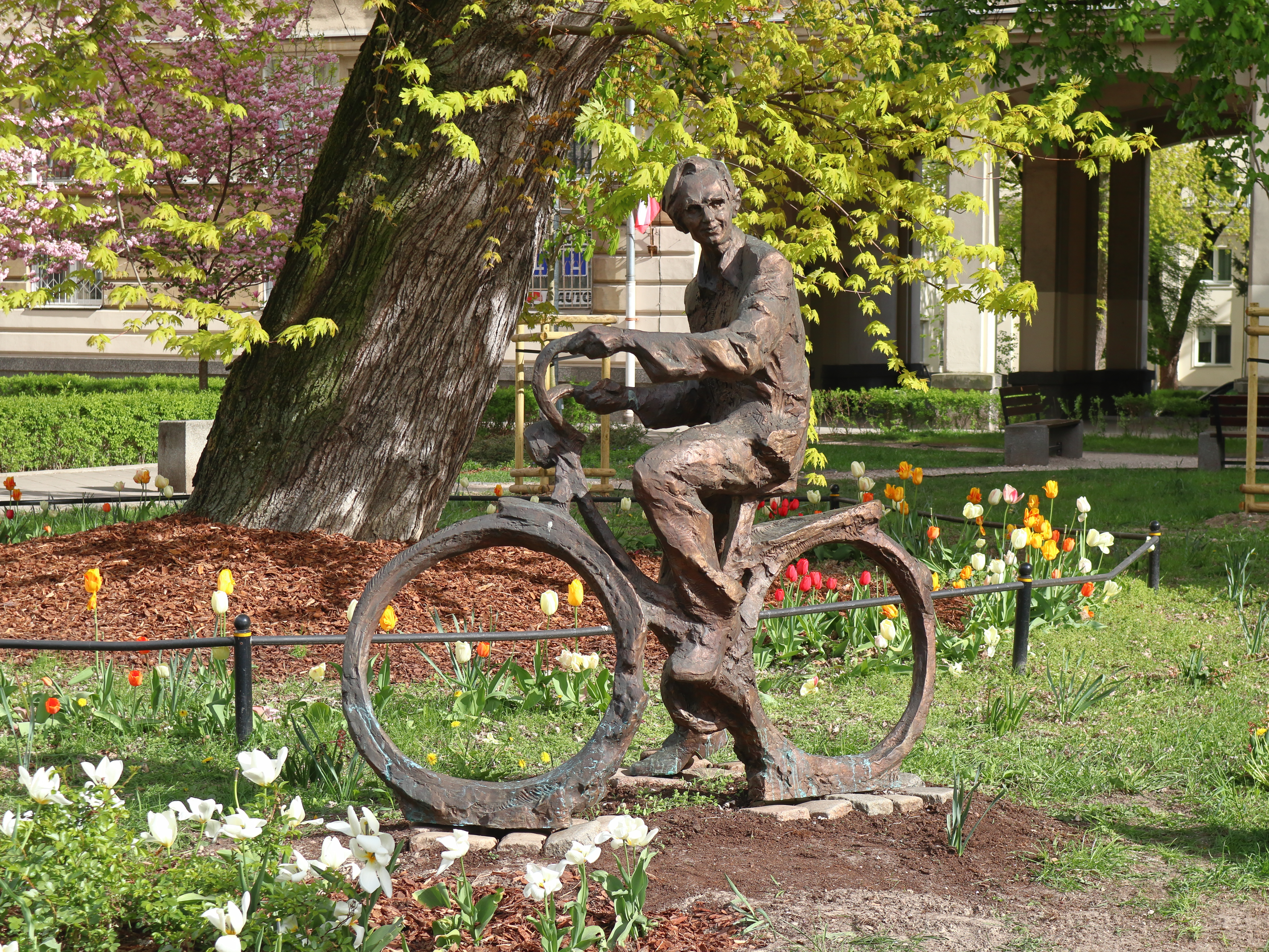
- The statue in 2026.
- Interactive map of Statue of Władysław Bartoszewski
- Location: Władysław Bartoszewski Square, Wola, Warsaw, Poland
- Coordinates: 52.239845°N 20.992829°E
- Designer: Jacek Kiciński
- Type: Statue
- Material: Bronze
- Opening date: 20 October 2025
- Dedicated to: Władysław Bartoszewski

The statue of Władysław Bartoszewski (Polish pronunciation: [vwaˈdɘ̟.swaf bar.tɔˈʂɛf.skʲi]; Polish: Pomnik Władysława Bartoszewskiego) is a monument in Warsaw, Poland, within the neighbourhood of Mirów in the Wola district. It is placed at the Władysław Bartoszewski Square, a small courtyard garden square located between buildings at 3, 5, and 7 Ogrodowa Street, and opposite to the district court of Warsaw on 6 Ogrodowa Street. It was designed by Jacek Kiciński, and unveiled on 20 October 2025. It has a form an of a bronze statue, depicting a 19-years-old Władysław Bartoszewski, riding on a bike. He was a 20th- and 21st-century academic, activist, writer, journalist, politician, and diplomat. In 1942, while Warsaw was under the German occupation during the Second World War, Bartoszewski joined the Home Army underground resistance, and the Council to Aid Jews, and in 1944, he fought in the Warsaw Uprising. After the war, he was the ambassador of Poland in Austria from 1990 to 1995, the Minister of Foreign Affairs of Poland from 1990 to 1995 and from 2000 to 2001, and the chairperson of the Council for the Protection of Struggle and Martyrdom Sites from 2001 to 2015

== History ==
On 4 December 2016, a small courtyard garden square between buildings at 3, 5, and 7 Ogrodowa Street, and opposite to the district court of Warsaw on 6 Ogrodowa Street, was named the Władysław Bartoszewski Square (Polish: Skwer Władysława Bartoszewskiego). It was dedicated to Władysław Bartoszewski, a 20th- and 21st-century academic, activist, writer, journalist, politician, and diplomat. In 1942, while Warsaw was under the German occupation during the Second World War, he joined the Home Army underground resistance, and the Council to Aid Jews, and in 1944, he fought in the Warsaw Uprising. After the war, Bartoszewski was a lecturer at the John Paul II Catholic University of Lublin, Ludwig-Maximilians-Universität München, and University of Augsburg. He was the ambassador of Poland in Austria from 1990 to 1995, the Minister of Foreign Affairs of Poland from 1990 to 1995 and from 2000 to 2001, and the chairperson of the Council for the Protection of Struggle and Martyrdom Sites from 2001 to 2015. Bartoszewski was awarded with the Order of the White Eagle, and the title of the Righteous Among the Nations. During the Second World War, location the square formed a part of Biała Street, which was one of main road links between the Warsaw Ghetto and the rest of the city. Its name was proposed by the Władysław Bartoszewski Square Association.

The association also financed the construction of a statue dedicated to Bartoszewski, which was unveiled at the square on 20 October 2025. It was designed by Jacek Kiciński, who previously also designed statues of Bartoszewski, placed in Białystok and Sopot.

== Characteristics ==
The statue is placed on the Władysław Bartoszewski Square (Polish: Skwer Władysława Bartoszewskiego), a small garden square in form of a courtyard located between buildings at 3, 5, and 7 Ogrodowa Street, and opposite to the district court of Warsaw at 6 Ogrodowa Street. A life-size bronze depicts a 19-years-old Władysław Bartoszewski, riding on a bike. It is placed directly on a ground, lacking a pedestal. It was based on a photograph.
