= Lebanese shipping =

The shipping industry is a major contributor to the Lebanese economy, having Lebanon's capital city, Beirut, as its major operations center from where distribution takes place to the Middle East region. The industry, which provides international transportation, logistic and household services, cover the ocean division, air freight division, land freight division, custom brokerage division, packing, insurance and warehousing.

== History ==
Lebanese shipping, which witnessed flourishing periods in its early history, had its main expansion in the mid 20th century. Before 1975 the port of Beirut was a major entrepôt for the Middle East, especially for goods bound for Damascus and Amman. In 1974 approximately 3.4 million tons of goods were unloaded at the Beirut docks, 668,000 tons were loaded, and 932,000 tons of transit goods were handled. When the Civil War began, however, the port became a major battleground. Battles also took place there in subsequent clashes between 1978 and 1987. Despite strenuous efforts to restore the port to full working order, by 1987 it had yet to regain anything like its former prominence. Between the start of the Civil War in 1975 until 1983, the port's best year was 1980, when some 2.7 million tons of cargo were unloaded, 248,056 tons were loaded, and 209,080 tons were handled in transit. The Israeli siege of Beirut led to a drastic drop in port activity in 1982, when goods handled fell to less than two-thirds of the 1980 level.

Lebanon's other traditional ports at Tyre and Sidon also have had troubled histories. Tyre suffered during the Civil War, during the Israeli invasions of 1978 and 1982, and during other Israeli military actions. Sidon was similarly afflicted, escaping only the 1978 assault. Both ports have also witnessed some internal conflict. After Israel's 1984 pullout from much of Lebanon, however, Tyre appeared to enjoy a revival of its local economy. Although Sidon suffered from further Shia-Palestinian conflict, it recovered modestly, and its export trade increased in early 1987.

Israel has persistently intervened in Lebanese maritime affairs. Its actions ranged from dispatching gunboats to positions off Beirut, a fairly common occurrence, to closing ports under Israeli control, such as Tyre and Sidon in 1984. From time to time, Israeli forces searched ships bound to or from Lebanese ports. In 1984, late 1986, and early 1987, Israel also stopped several ships ferrying passengers between Larnaca in Cyprus and Juniyah, the principal port of the Maronite heartland. Israel claimed that the ships were being used to infiltrate Palestinian guerrillas into Lebanon and warned that the Larnaca-Juniyah link would be closed altogether if the vessels continued to carry Palestinian fighters.

== Growth ==
Although the shipping industry witnessed some past downturns, in 2008 numbers showed increasing records and expanding activities. Lebanon's Port of Beirut TEU activity up to July, 2008 reached 287,898 TEUs, representing an increase of 16% from the same period the prior year. On the other hand, Port of Beirut TEU activity increased 30.9% year on year to 444,165 in 2007.

== Lebanese Shipping Companies ==
Some notable Lebanese shipping companies include:

- GIFCO Freight Forwarding Company
- IFFCO Shipping Lebanon
- ABC Shipping Co
- ORIENT SHIPPING & TRADING COMPANY S.A.R.L.
- ABOU MERHI LINES S.A.L.
- METZ SHIPPING AGENCY LIMITED
- MOLLER-MAERSK, A.P., GROUP
- Sabra Freight Services

== See also ==
- Economy of Lebanon
- Port of Beirut
- Beirut Rafiq Hariri International Airport
