= Ship abandonment =

Event in which a ship is abandoned

Ship abandonment can occur for a variety of reasons and cannot be defined in a single way. Most cases are of ships abandoned by owners because of economic hardship or economic issues, for example because it becomes less expensive than continuing to operate, paying debts, port fees, crew wages, etc. The abandoned ships may remain, often with their crews as hostages, in a port for extended periods, with the crew unpaid, and possibly dangerous cargo on board. In many cases, the crew cannot leave without losing their right to be paid. Abandonment has been described as a "cancer" of the shipping industry.

If cases go to court, the sale of the vessel can be ordered, but this can take many months. Jurisdiction is often unclear because many abandoned vessels sailed under "flags of convenience" (open registries). An amendment to the Maritime Labour Convention made it easier for unpaid crew to be paid via insurance.

In 2020, the International Maritime Organization (IMO) database listed 438 ships worldwide, with 5,767 crew members, abandoned since 2004; not all cases are referred to the IMO, so the actual number is larger, but unknown. By August 2020, 470 seafarers on 31 vessels had been abandoned.

Seafarers' problems, including abandonment, in the Arab world and Iran were sufficiently severe for the International Transport Workers' Federation (ITF) to set up a network for the region; its coordinator said "The flood of calls to ITF in the Arab region has never stopped. Since we created the network and seafarers [became] aware of us, the numbers of calls are going up and up". As of 2020 the network was dealing with 15 cases of abandonment.

== Notable cases ==
- A notorious case was the 2013 abandonment of MV Rhosus in Beirut, Lebanon, the unloading and storing for years of its explosive cargo, and the ensuing catastrophic explosion on 4 August 2020. A previous crew had mutinied due to unpaid wages. When the ship docked in Beirut, it was arrested for non-payment of port dues, and the owner did not respond to the captain's communications. The captain and three crew members remained on the ship, unpaid, for a year, relying on the port agent for food and water to keep them alive. The explosive cargo was unloaded as collateral for the unpaid debts, then left for years in a warehouse until it exploded.
- Celanova, a broken-down Spanish-flagged liquefied gas carrier with 15 crew trapped in Manila, Philippines for months in 2020. The ITF and the International Labour Organization intervened to allow the crew to land, and the ship was sold, presumably to pay creditors.
- The MV Aman was detained by the Egyptian port authorities in July 2017 due to expired safety equipment. In normal circumstances this would be easy to resolve but the owners of the ship were in financial difficulty. Mohammed Aisha was left on the ship as its legal guardian for four years before being allowed to leave, thanks to the ITF offering one of its legal representatives to take his place.
