= Ship arrest =

Legal action

Ship arrest refers to the civil law procedure whereby a ship or similar marine vessel may be arrested by judicial process and held under state authority in a particular jurisdiction pending the determination of present or future claims relating to the vessel. The ship is detained by judicial process for the purpose of securing a maritime claim, or for unseaworthiness and certain other conditions.

A ship may be "arrested" and detained in port by a court order in support of a maritime lien claim by creditors against the vessel.

The grounds upon which a ship may be arrested vary under the legal systems of different countries. But common grounds which may permit arrest may include:

- damage to cargo carried by the ship
- damage caused by a collision with the ship
- to protect a mortgage or maritime lien over the ship
- unpaid pilotage or towage relating to the ship

== International Conventions ==
A number of international conventions have been entered into in relation to arrest of ships under maritime law. They include:

- International Convention on Arrest of Ships (1999)
- International Convention for the unification of certain rules relating to Arrest of Sea-going Ships, 1952
