= Arrest Convention 1999 =

In 1999, the final text of the International Convention on Arrest of Ships was concluded, and the Convention (generally known as the "Arrest Convention 1999") came into force on 14 September 2011.

The intent of the International Maritime Organization is that the 1999 Convention will come to replace the 1952 Convention, and as of 2019 the 1999 Convention has 17 state parties. Countries ratifying 1999 Convention to date include: Albania, Algeria, Benin, Bulgaria, Congo, Denmark, Ecuador, Estonia, Finland, Latvia, Liberia, Norway, Pakistan, Peru, Spain, Syria and Turkey.

The new 1999 Convention follows the pattern of the 1952 Convention, but has a slightly less "Anglo-Saxon" bias. Although a signatory in 1999 to the final text, as of May 2015, the UK has yet to ratify the convention. The convention broadly follows the scheme of the UK system currently enacted in the Senior Courts Act 1981 (formerly the "Supreme Court Act 1981"), with some important additions. The Senior Courts Act 1981 is broadly in line with the 1952 Brussels Convention. While acknowledging the concept of maritime lien, the 1999 Convention specifically creates no new maritime liens.

Article 1 adds new categories of "Maritime Claim". These include "damage or threat of damage caused by the ship to the environment, coastline or related interests..." (Article 1(d)); and unpaid insurance premiums and unpaid P&I Club calls.

== UK arrest procedure ==
Despite being a party to devising the text of the 1999 Convention, the UK has (as of April 2016) yet to ratify it, so the 1952 Convention still applies in Great Britain.

In the UK, a ship arrest is effected by an ex parte approach to the Admiralty Court in the Rolls Building in Fetter Lane, London. After an outline inquiry into the merits of the maritime claim, the Court would grant an Arrest Warrant to be executed by the Admiralty Marshal. Once appropriate security for the alleged debt, such as a Banker's Order or a P&I Club Letter of Guarantee, was lodged, the Court could order its Marshal to release the ship. The claim would then be examined some time later at a "hearing on the Merits", either in court or before an arbitrator.

One should distinguish between "arrest" and "detention"; the latter involves the detaining of a ship by a port using pre-existing powers of Port State Control or, in the case of a marina, simple contractual rights of lien.
