= Orient Queen (1989) =

Cruise ship built in 1989

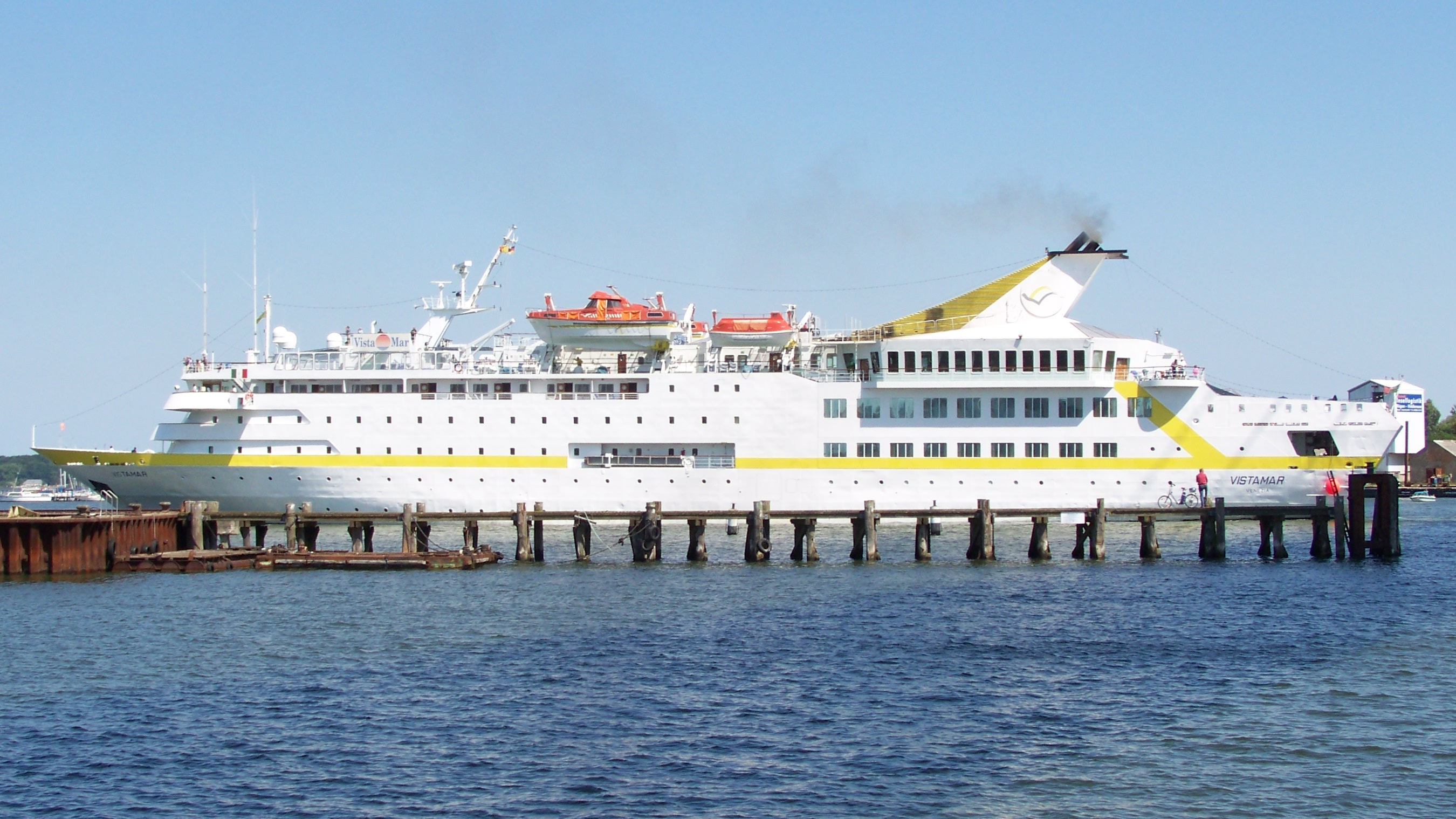
- As Vistamar in 2008, entering the port of Stralsund, Germany

History
- Name: 1989–2012: Vistamar; 2012–2016: Orient Queen II; 2016–2018: Med Queen; 2018–2020: Orient Queen
- Operator: Abou Merhi Cruises
- Port of registry: 1989–2001: Panama City, Panama; 2001–2006: Santa Cruz de Tenerife, Spain; 2006: Valletta, Malta; 2006–2007: Kingstown, Saint Vincent and the Grenadines; 2007–2012: Venezia, Italy; 2012: Valletta, Malta; 2012–2016: Panama City, Panama; 2016: Valletta, Malta; 2016–2020: Nassau, Bahamas
- Builder: Union Naval de Levante
- Yard number: 175
- Identification: Call sign: C6CT7; IMO number: 8701193; MMSI number: 311000571
- Fate: Damaged by explosion, capsized 5 August 2020. Scrapped July 2022.

General characteristics
- Type: Cruise ship
- Tonnage: 7,478 GT
- Length: 128.8 m (423 ft)
- Beam: 16.82 m (55.2 ft)

Orient Queen was a former cruise ship built in 1989 for the company Mar Lines by the Unión Naval de Levante shipyard in Valencia, Spain. On 4 August 2020, the ship was badly damaged by an explosion in Beirut, Lebanon, near where she was berthed, and subsequently capsized.

== History ==
Originally named Vistamar, the ship was operated under charter by German-based cruise companies, first Jahn Reisen then Plantours & Partner. The ship was operated in the Caribbean and the Mediterranean, but also undertook voyages to the Arctic and the Antarctic, to Greenland and up the Amazon River. In 2003 it sailed through the Amazon River to Iquitos, Peru, around 4,400 kilometres (2,700 mi) from the coast of Atlantic Ocean, becoming the first large cruise ship to do so.

In 2001, Vistamar struck a submerged object in the South Atlantic; in 2003, it struck submerged rocks near Ibiza (the ship's then home port) soon after departing on a 12-day cruise, and required repair in drydock. The ship was towed back by tugs and the passengers disembarked.

In the 21st century, its ownership changed many times but it continued to be mainly operated by Plantours. In 2012, it was renamed and acquired by the Lebanon-based Abou Merhi Group.

The vessel's home port was Beirut and it typically operated in the eastern Mediterranean, calling at ports in Greece and Turkey. There was accommodation for 370 guests.

== 2020 Beirut explosion ==
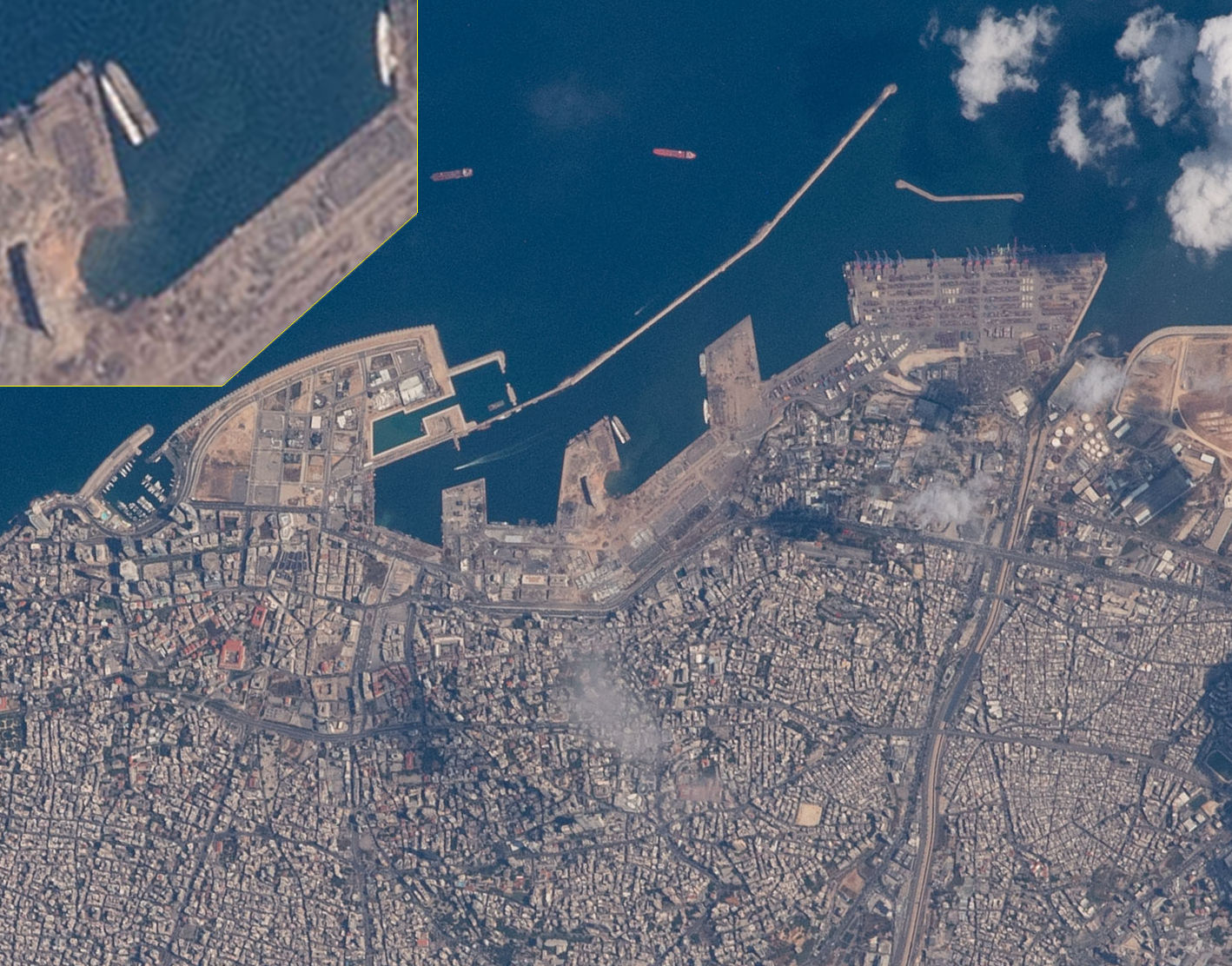
Chris Cassidy's photograph of the Beirut Port from the ISS on August 11. The capsized ship is visible in the top right angle of the closeup.

Orient Queen arrived in Beirut on 27 June 2020 following a 22-day voyage from King Abdullah Port in Saudi Arabia. On 4 August, the vessel was severely damaged by an ammonium nitrate explosion while moored at its berth.

The ship was left listing to starboard. Two crew, both Filipino nationals, were killed and several people injured. A crewmember, interviewed after the explosion, stated "The ship is totally destroyed – the cabins, the saloon, everything". The ship capsized that night after its list worsened, then partially sank. Several other ships were damaged in the same incident.

On 7 August, the first lawsuit related to the explosions was filed by Abou Merhi, whose offices were also destroyed.

In July of 2022, the ship underwent the process of being broken up on-site. By November of 2025, all visible remnants of the ship were removed.
