= Port of Beirut =

Port in Lebanon and quarter of Beirut

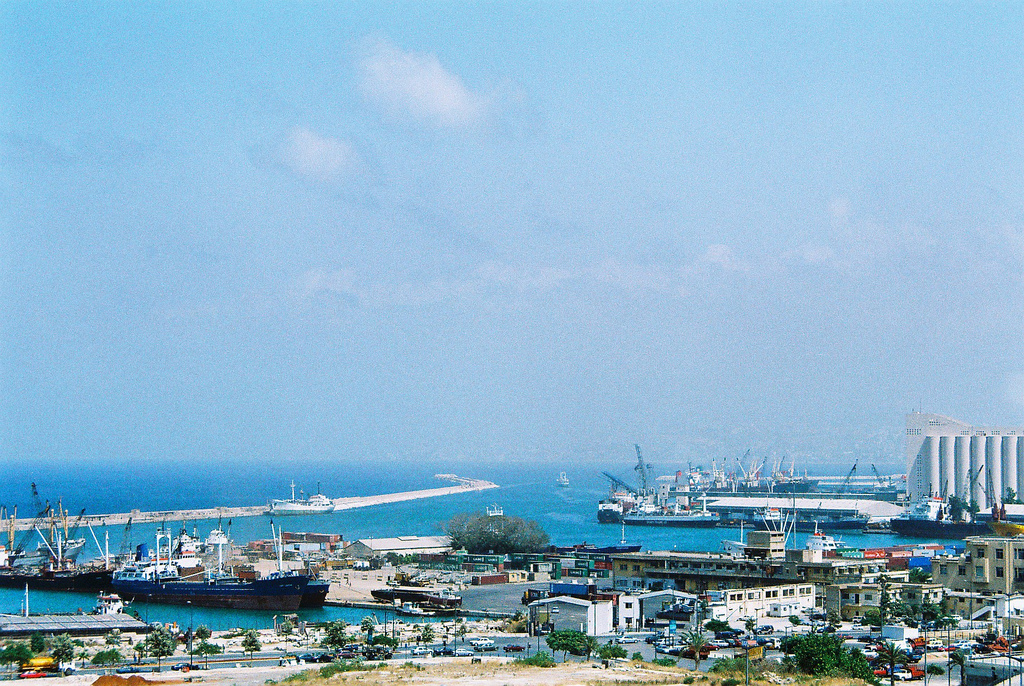
- Port of Beirut in 2003
- Interactive map of Port of Beirut
- Native name: مرفأ بيروت

Location
- Country: Lebanon
- Location: Beirut
- Coordinates: 33°54′10″N 35°31′30″E
- UN/LOCODE: LBBEY

Details
- Opened: 1887
- Operated by: Gestion et Exploitation du Port de Beyrouth (GEPB)
- Owned by: Government of Lebanon
- Type of harbour: Artificial
- Size of harbour: 1.002 km^{2} (0.387 sq mi)
- Size: 1.2 km^{2} (0.46 sq mi)
- No. of berths: 16
- Employees: 639
- General Manager: Bassem Al Qaisi

Statistics
- Vessel arrivals: 2,395 (2009)
- Annual cargo tonnage: 5.8 million tonnes (2009)
- Annual container volume: 1,229,081 TEU (2019)
- Passenger traffic: 6,699 (2009)
- Annual revenue: $163,486,146 (2009)
- Website www.portdebeyrouth.com Beirut Container Terminal Consortium

The Port of Beirut (Arabic: مرفأ بيروت) is the main port in Lebanon on the eastern part of the Saint George Bay on Beirut's northern Mediterranean coast, west of the Beirut River. It is one of the largest and busiest ports on the Eastern Mediterranean.

On 4 August 2020, a large explosion, caused by improperly stored ammonium nitrate, occurred at the port, killing at least 218 people, injuring more than 7,000 and rendering 300,000 others homeless. Large sections of the port and its infrastructure were destroyed, including most of Beirut's grain reserves, and billions of dollars in damages were inflicted across the city. The Port of Beirut was forced to close, due to the large-scale damage caused by the explosions, with cargo being redirected to smaller ports, such as Tripoli and Tyre. Prior to the disaster, about 60 percent of Lebanon's imports came through the port, according to an S&P Global estimate.

On 14 April 2022, the Lebanese government ordered the demolition of Beirut’s grain silos, which were at risk of collapse after the 2020 port explosion. On 31 July and 4 August 2022, exactly 2 years after the explosion, the last of the northern block of the grain silos fell down.

== Management ==
The port has been nicknamed the "Cave of Ali Baba and the 40 Thieves" due to longstanding reports of corruption, including evasion of customs duties at the port due to bribery schemes and the undervaluation of imports. In the early 2010s, Public Works and Transportation Minister Ghazi Aridi estimated that tax evasion at the port amounted to more than $1.5 billion annually. The port also earns this nickname for its abandonment of cargo and crew. In the aftermath of massive explosions in 2020, in an apparent industrial accident, Faysal Itani, a political analyst and deputy director of the Center for Global Policy at Georgetown University wrote that the Port, like other aspects of Lebanese society, suffered from "pervasive culture of negligence, petty corruption and blame-shifting."

== History ==
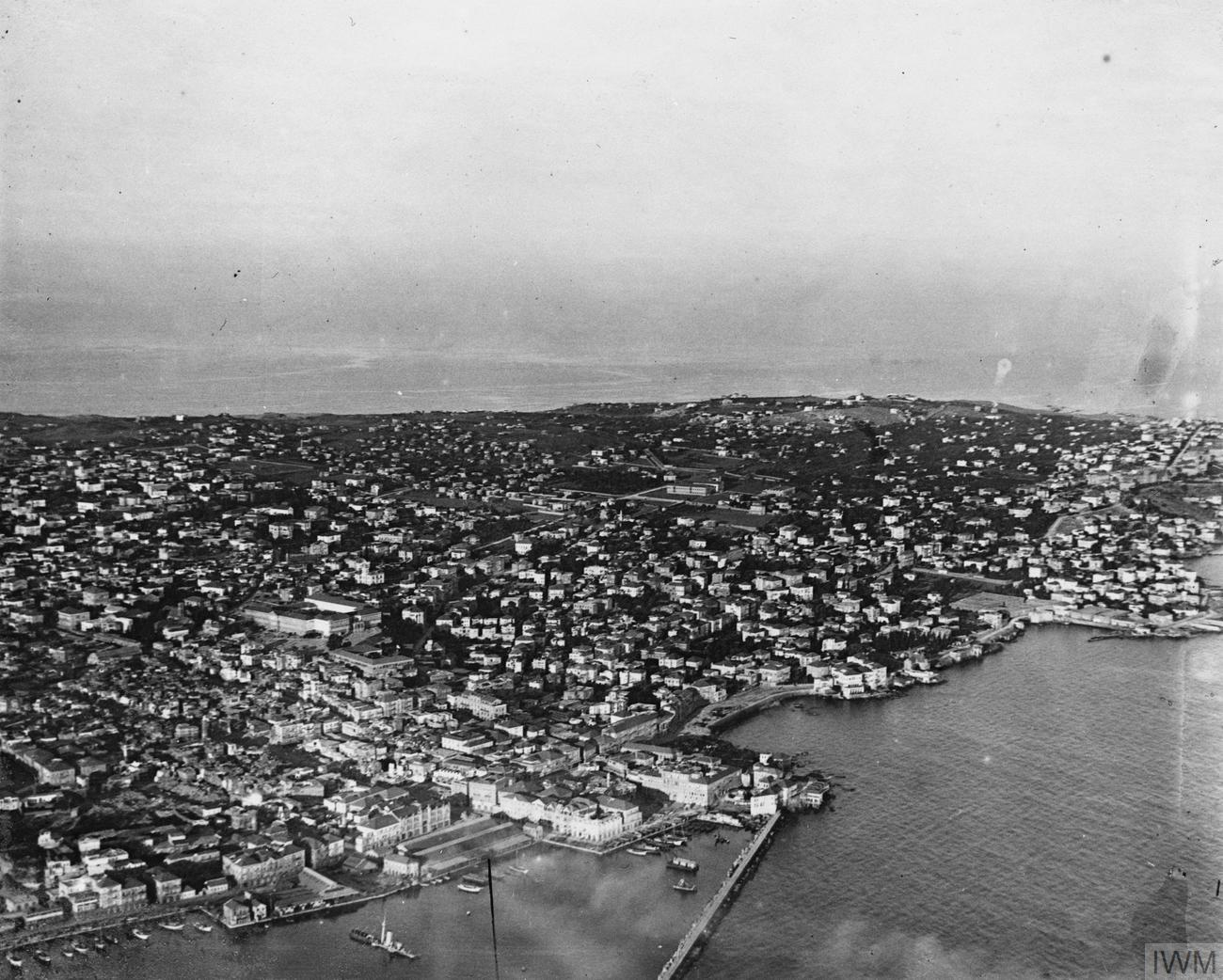
Beirut harbour seen from the air during World War I

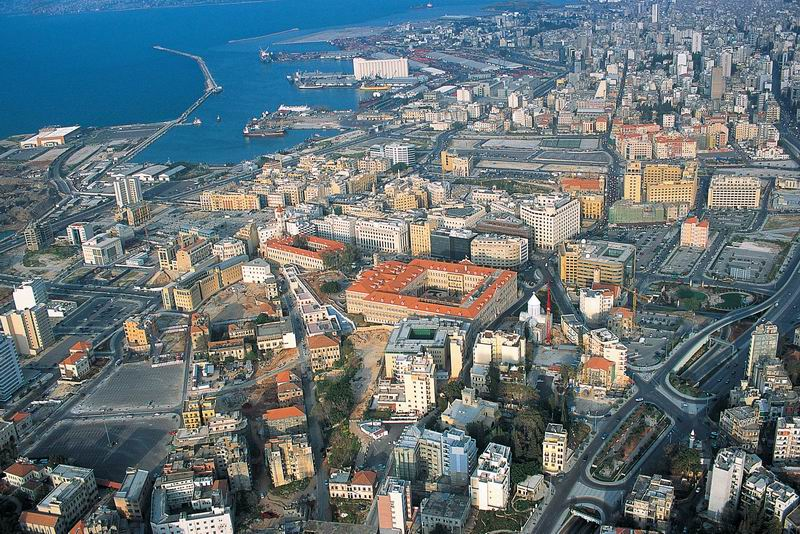
The Port of Beirut can be seen in this 2005 aerial view.

In 1887, during Ottoman rule, the Port was granted to a French Company, the Compagnie du Port, des Quais et des Entrepôts de Beyrouth (Company of the Port, Quays and Warehouses of Beirut). The Ottoman administration granted further concessions and autonomy to the company, in managing the Port of Beirut, as it became an important harbour in Lebanon. In 1920, Lebanon came under French Administration, under the Mandate for Syria and the Lebanon, acting as Greater Lebanon. This provided the Port with access to French funding and trade. The Port of Beirut would be continue to be operated by the same French Company, which renamed the Gestion et Exploitation du Port de Beyrouth in 1960.

Much of the port was damaged during the Lebanese Civil War, and various parts of the port were under the control of various armed militias. In 1976, all shipping at the port stopped for nine months due to militia clashes. A 1977 article in the Middle East Economic Digest reported that "not a warehouse or piece of equipment was intact" when the port officially reopened on 15 December 1976. The Lebanese Forces, a Christian militia, took control of the port in mid-1986; the militia withdrew in 1989 amid a push from Lebanese Army forces under the command of General Michel Aoun. In 1991, Lebanese Forces that had controlled a pier at the Beirut port were ousted by Lebanese Army forces under Emile Lahoud; the seizure was part of broader efforts by President Elias Hrawi to consolidate power in the Beirut area, and coincided with the ouster of the Shi'a Amal from the Ouzai port and the predominately Druze Progressive Socialist Party from the Khalde harbor.

After the war, the seaport and surrounding area were reconstructed and again became a major seaport. The port is operated and managed by the Gestion et Exploitation du Port de Beyrouth (GEPB), ("Port Authority of Beirut"). In 1990, the Port of Beirut came under direct ownership of the Government of Lebanon, following the expiration of the company's charter, and continues to be operated by GEPB.

=== Container terminal ===
Since December, 2004, container terminal operations are subcontracted to the private Beirut Container Terminal Consortium (BCTC). The terminal quay was expanded to 1100 m and has 16 post-panamax ship-to-shore gantry cranes, and extensive on-shore container handling equipment. In addition to exports and imports, the terminal handles significant container transshipments. Traffic has grown from 945,143 TEUs in 2008, to 1,229,081 in 2019.

=== 2020 Beirut explosion ===
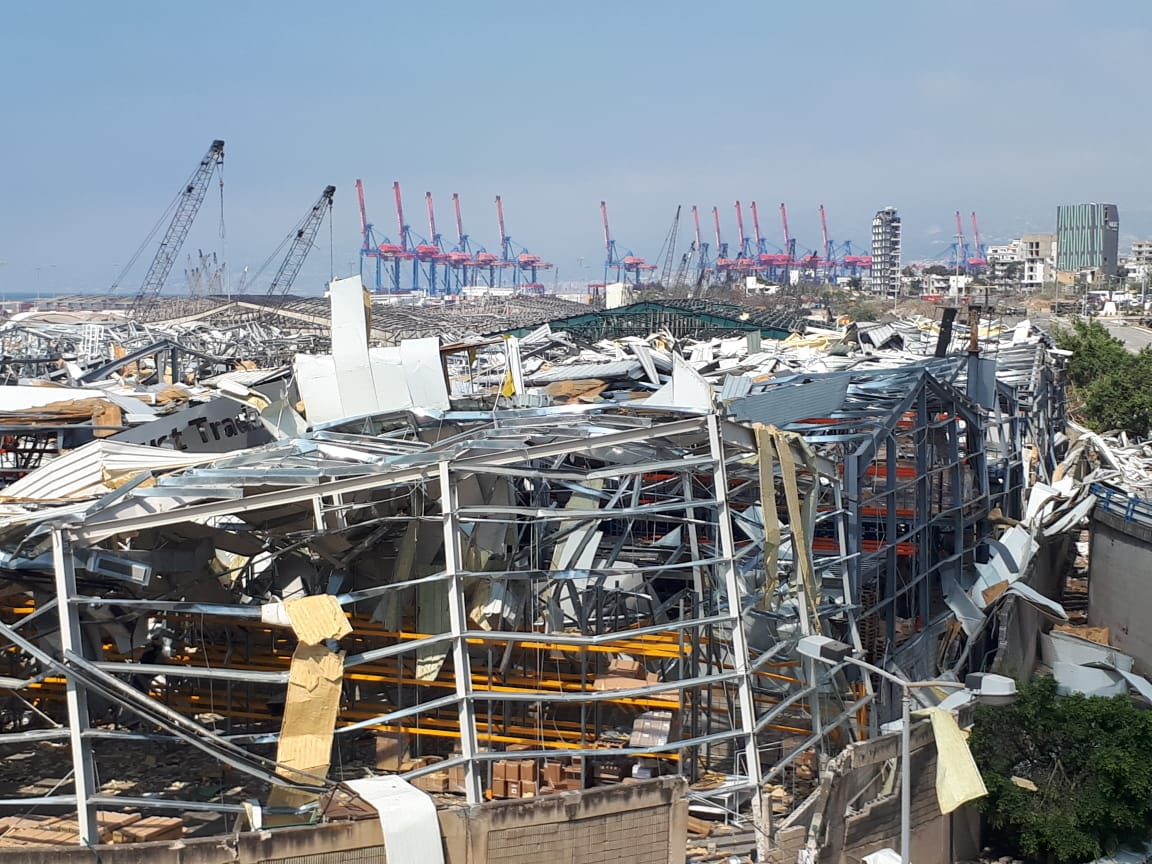
Warehouse damaged by the 4 August 2020 explosion, with container terminal gantry cranes in the background

On 4 August 2020, a series of explosions occurred in the port. At least 204 people were killed (with an additional 3 missing) plus 6,500 were injured; the explosion initially killed several port workers, with the resulting shockwave affecting half of the city, killing several residents in their homes and people in buildings and streets. The explosions destroyed large parts of the port, including its warehouses and grain elevator; however, satellite imagery taken after the explosion shows the container port largely intact. As of 14 August, the container port was operating.

Up to 300,000 people may have been rendered homeless, according to Beirut City Governor Marwan Abboud. Damage estimates are in the billions of dollars, some estimates reaching $15 billion. The cruise ship Orient Queen sank in the port after receiving massive damage.

The initial explosion may have occurred in a fireworks warehouse, while a subsequent larger blast came from 2,750 tons of highly explosive ammonium nitrate that had been stored for the preceding six years at a depot at the port, specifically Hangar 12. The ammonium nitrate had arrived at the port in September 2013, on board a Russian-owned, Moldovan-flagged cargo ship called the MV Rhosus. The vessel came from Georgia and was bound for Mozambique, but was abandoned by its owners and crew in Beirut. In six letters over the next three years, port customs officials warned Lebanese authorities about the dangers of the storage of the chemical at the port and asked for authorisation to re-export it, turn it over to the army, or sell it to a Lebanese explosives company. However, no action was taken to remove the stockpile, as all six letters were ignored. Following the explosions which came from the Port of Beirut, the Government of Lebanon placed 16 Port Officials under house arrest, due to questions on the management of the port. On January 16, 2025, it was announced that the investigation about the explosion will resume.

=== Fire in the port area ===
On 10 September 2020, a large fire erupted in the port area covering the skies of Beirut with toxic gas. The incident occurred in a cooking oil warehouse and food parcels belonging to the International Committee of the Red Cross (ICRC), then spread to a stock of rubber tires in the port's duty-free zone. Following black smoke rising above the city's skyline, panic broke out due to the fear of another explosion, and motivated people to flee the city, with the addition of the Beirut governor Marwan Abboud asking the people of Beirut to reduce traffic to roads leading to the port, for the firefighters to act quick with putting off the fires. The fire was brought under control, by fire personnel on the ground and by Lebanese Air Force helicopters dropping water.

== See also ==
- Beirut Castle
