= Ship mortgage =

Type of mortgage

In a ship mortgage (common law) or ship hypothec (civil law term, covering also a maritime lien), a shipowner gives a lender (or mortgagee) a security interest in a ship as collateral for a mortgage loan. Similar to other types of mortgages, a ship mortgage legally consists of three parts: the mortgage loan, the mortgage document (deed) and the rights derived from the mortgage deed onto money lender. Ship mortgages differ from other types of mortgage in three ways. First, some privileged claims could have a higher ranking over that of mortgagee against the ship. Second, ships naturally move between jurisdictions. And third, a ship is always at risk of partial or total damages at sea. The use of ship mortgages emerged as a widely accepted practice in shipping industry in the 19th century as a major source of finance for ship owners.

== Modern forms of statutory mortgages ==
In United Kingdom, ship mortgages practice traces to the Merchant Shipping Act 1894 (57 & 58 Vict. c. 60), the Merchant Shipping Act 1988 and subsequent amendments to the 1988 act. Paragraph 21 of schedule 1 to the Merchant Shipping Act 1988 provides that "a registered ship, or a share in any such ship, may be made a security for the repayment of a loan or the discharge of any other obligation; and on production of the instrument creating any such security (referred to in this Act as a mortgage), the registrar of the ship's port of registry shall record it in the register."

In the Merchant Shipping Act 1894 (57 & 58 Vict. c. 60), it is provided that only registered ships can be subject to statutory legal mortgages; any other mortgage related to ships shall take effect as a purely equitable mortgage, which may emerge on unfinished vessels, foreign vessels, and others.

== Registration of statutory mortgages ==
The registration of a ship mortgage is essential to have legal effects, though failure to register does not render the mortgage void: under Merchant Shipping Acts, any unregistered mortgagee cannot enjoy any benefits available.

Even with the protection clause to the buyer in Norwegian Sales Form 1993, "the Sellers warrant that the Vessel, at the time of delivery, is free from all charters, encumbrances, mortgages and maritime liens or any other debts whatsoever." For buyers, registration of ships with mortgages is particularly important to avoid future litigation after sales due to claims related to unregistered mortgages.

=== Protection against other mortgagees ===
The most critical benefits of registration for the mortgagee is obtaining priority, with priority ranking solely decided by the date of registration. By giving a "notice to the world", the registered mortgagee could be protected from all later secured creditors of the mortgagor, who may seek further finance from other sources using the same ship as security.

In UK, regulation 59 of the Merchant Shipping (Registration of Ships) Regulations 1993, mortgagees of a ship or a share in a registered British ship are allowed to give notice of their intended interests to and recorded by the Registrar. Once later executed or registered, the registered mortgagees will have priority over the other registered mortgages which may have been fully registered in the first place.

=== Priority rankings ===
Registration confers a mortgagee higher priority over the following scenarios but not limited to:

1. earlier unregistered mortgages, irrespective of knowledge of them;
2. later registered or unregistered mortgages; and
3. additional advances subsequently made under a prior registered mortgage where under the agreement was that mortgage should cover present and future advances by the mortgagee.

However, a mortgagee does not have priority over the following scenarios but not limited to:

1. any mortgage registered earlier;
2. any claims in connection with which the vessel had already been arrested at the time when the mortgage was entered into;
3. any possessory lien of a ship repairer; and
4. maritime liens, whether earlier or later

=== Mortgage registration in China ===
According to Article 20, Chapter IV of Regulations of the People's Republic of China Governing the Registration of Ships, both the mortgagor and the mortgagee are required to submit three major documents first:

1. written application signed by both parties;
2. original Ship Ownership Registration Certificate; and
3. contract of ship mortgage

== Collateral deed ==
As a basic statutory form of mortgage, a reference to a collateral deed containing detailed particulars should be included:

1. the time for repayment of the principal sums;
2. the interest payable on the capital sum loaned;
3. the method of payment;
4. the party responsible for insuring the ship;
5. any restriction which the mortgage may take place on the manner in which the ship is to be used; and
6. conditions when default will be considered by the mortgagor, allowing the mortgage to re-possess and sell the mortgaged security
