= 1952 Arrest Convention =

1952 multilateral treaty

International Convention for the unification of certain rules relating to Arrest of Sea-going Ships
- Type: Admiralty law
- Signed: 10 May 1952
- Location: Brussels, Belgium
- Effective: 24 February 1956
- Condition: Two ratifications
- Signatories: 19
- Parties: 71
- Depositary: Government of the Kingdom of Belgium
- Languages: English and French

The 1952 Arrest Convention (full title: International Convention for the unification of certain rules relating to Arrest of Sea-going Ships) is a 1952 multilateral treaty whereby states agree to rules on the arrest of ships.

By the convention, states agree to the following rule: a state agrees to allow a foreign jurisdiction to arrest a ship of its nationality that is present in the foreign jurisdiction's port. The arrest can be made only after a warrant of arrest is issued in the domestic jurisdiction of the port state. The rules of the Convention apply only if both the state of nationality and the state performing the arrest are state parties to the convention.

The convention was concluded and signed on 10 May 1952 in Brussels, Belgium; it entered into force on 24 February 1956. It has been signed by 19 states and is in force in 71 jurisdictions. Spain, an original signatory of the convention, denounced it in 2011. The depositary of the convention is the government of Belgium.

(The French title is Convention internationale pour l'unification de certaines règles sur la saisie conservatoire des navires de mer.)

== Arrest Convention 1999 ==
In 1999, the International Convention on Arrest of Ships was concluded. The intent of the International Maritime Organization is that the 1999 Convention will come to replace the 1952 Convention, but as of 2014 the 1999 Convention has only 11 state parties. It entered into force on 14 September 2011.
