= Lebanese Renewal Party =

Lebanese Nationalist political party

Lebanese Renewal Party حزب التجدد اللبناني
- Leader: Etienne Saqr
- Founder: Etienne Saqr; Said Akl; May Murr
- Founded: 1972
- Dissolved: 1990
- Military wing: Guardians of the Cedars
- Ideology: Lebanese nationalism Ultranationalism; Phoenicianism; Anti-communism
- Political position: Far-right

The Lebanese Renewal Party – LRP (Arabic: حزب التجدد اللبناني transliteration Hezb al-Tajaddud al-Lubnani) or Parti de la Renovation Libanaise (PRL) in French, was a political party in Lebanon formed in 1972 by a number of staunch Lebanese nationalists including activist Etienne Saqr, poet Said Akl and writer May Murr. Its ideology was based on Phoenicianism and the idea that the Lebanese nation is an independent non-Arab entity and is not part of the Arab World. This orientation also warned against pan-Arabism, leftist ideology and the Palestinian military presence in Lebanon.

== History ==
It was formed by right-wing activists opposed to the presence of the Palestinian refugees in Lebanon. The refugee population also included a substantial element of Palestine Liberation Organization (PLO) fighters, especially after the 1970 Black September events in Jordan. This created severe tension in Lebanon, and is believed by many to have been a driving factor behind the outbreak of civil war in 1975.

During the Lebanese Civil War, the party and its militia were a small but active part of the Maronite-led alliance fighting the Palestinians represented by the Rejectionist Front and PLO, and its allies in the Lebanese National Movement (LNM) of Kamal Jumblatt. During the early fighting in the war, the party was implicated in the massacres of Karantina and Tel al-Zaatar. In 1977, the main Christian-backed militias (LRP plus the National Liberal Party and the Kataeb Party) formed the Lebanese Front coalition. Their militias joined under the name of the Lebanese Forces, but the Lebanese Forces soon fell under the command of Bashir Gemayel and the Phalange. The Lebanese Renewal Party (LRP) and the Guardians of the Cedars were uncompromisingly opposed to the Syrian occupation of Lebanon.

After the 1982 Lebanon War the party cooperated with Israel Defense Forces, and its militia joined the South Lebanon Army (SLA). After the withdrawal of Israel from Lebanon in 2000, most of the leadership fled to Israel. The group was banned by the Syrian-dominated government and decided to give up its arms to become a traditional political party. It remains banned, and is only a minor force in national life. Still, some of the rhetoric used by the LRP in advocating its domestic policies was revived during the Cedar Revolution in 2005, which forced the withdrawal of Syria from Lebanon and led to expectations of political reform.

=== Ideological beliefs ===
The Lebanese Renewal Party is ethnocentric, and believes that Lebanon is not an Arab country. It labored extensively to create or discover non-Arab cultural expressions, and went so far as to design a new alphabet for Lebanese Arabic, which it claims is a language in its own right. Accordingly, the party was staunchly opposed to Pan-Arabism, which was advocated by many in the left-wing Lebanese National Movement (LNM) and Palestinian movements.

Another distinguishing element of the party's politics was that it advocated cooperation with Israel. While there were several other movements on the Christian side in Lebanon that cooperated with Israel during the war, the LNR was the only organization openly and ideologically committed to this, regarding a Lebanese-Israeli axis as the best protection against Arabism and the Palestinians.
