= Akl =

Akl is a common Arabic name (written as عقل in Arabic). Notable people with the name include:

== Given name ==
- Akl Awit (born 1952), Lebanese academic

== Surname ==
- Georges Akl, Lebanese painter
- Mounia Akl, Lebanese actress
- Said Akl (1911–2014), also Said Aql, Saeed Akl, Lebanese writer
- Selim Akl (born 1948), computing academic at Queen's University, Canada

== See also ==
- AKL (disambiguation)
