= Dawit =

Dawit is Amharic name for King David of Israel

- Reference Amharic Bible Ruth 4:22

Dawit is a given name. Notable people with the name include

- Dawit I, nəgusä nägäst (1382–1413), of Ethiopia, and a member of the Solomonic dynasty
- Dawit II, Emperor Anbasa Segad, birth name Lebna Dengel (1501–1540), nəgusä nägäst (1508–1540) of Ethiopia
- Dawit III, Dawit the Singer, nəgusä nägäst (1716–1721), of Ethiopia and a member of the Solomonic dynasty
- Dawit Amanuel (1862–1944), the main translator of the New Testament in the Tigre language, published in 1902
- Bruck Dawit, Ethiopian-American audio engineer and music producer
- Dawit Isaak (born 1964), Swedish-Eritrean playwright, journalist and writer
- Dawit Kebede (born 1980), Ethiopian print media journalist, winner of the 2010 CPJ International Press Freedom Award
- Prince Joel Dawit Makonnen (born 1982), Ethiopian prince
- Dawit Mebratu (born 1984), Ethiopian football midfielder
- Dawit Wolde (born 1991), Ethiopian middle-distance runner who specialises in the 1500 metres
- Dawit Yifru (born 1952), Ethiopian keyboardist and music arranger

== See also ==
- Awit (disambiguation)
