= Lebanese nationalism =

Flag of Lebanon.

Map of Phoenicia and its Mediterranean trade routes.

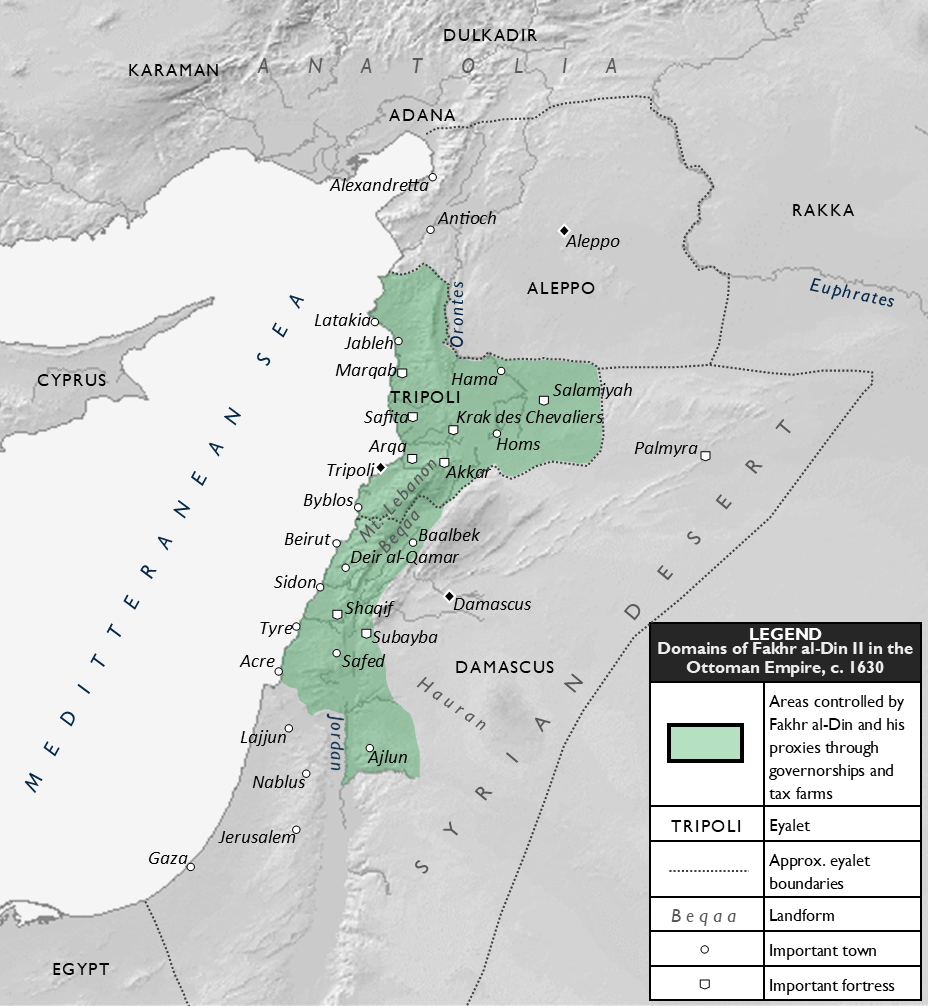
The peak of Fakhreddine's land conquests.

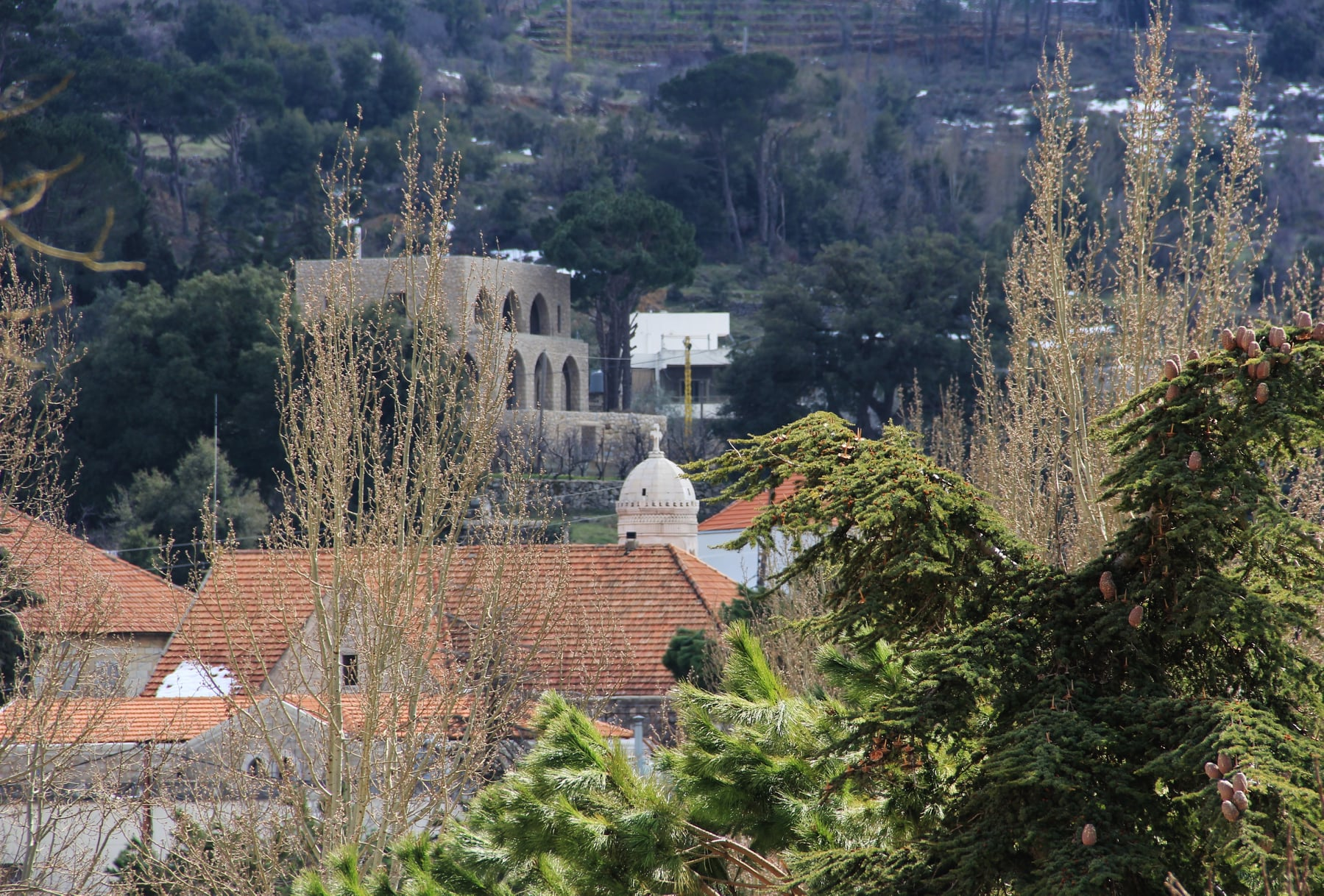
Christian Church and Druze Khalwa in Shuf Mountains: The Maronites and the Druze set the foundation for what is now Lebanon in the early 18th century.

Lebanese nationalism is a nationalist ideology that emphasises Lebanon's history, sovereignty and identity, in which it considers the Lebanese people as separate from the rest of its neighbours and strives to maintain Lebanon as an independent nation-state.

The ideology has been summoned many times throughout Lebanese history and has been the main driver for movements and campaigns in opposition to Sectarianism, Syrian irredentism, Syrian ultra nationalism, foreign intervention in Lebanon, Syrian occupation of Lebanon, Ba'athism, Pan-Arabism, French mandate in Greater Lebanon, and Ottoman rule in Lebanon. Followed by numerous factions, Lebanese nationalism has been upheld in a multi-confessional and complex world, that is why, different sects who support this idea, believe in different founding myths. The modern civic strand precedes historical one. It recognizes the country's part in the broader Arab world, but prioritizes national unity over Pan-Arabism. On the other hand, the much older branch suggests descendance and cultural links to pre-Arab populations, notably the Phoenicians. This idea was historically supported by Lebanese Maronites.

== History ==
The development of Lebanese nationalism is closely linked to the historical evolution of Mount Lebanon, particularly the relationship between the Druze and Maronite community. They played an important role in the formation of the modern state of Lebanon .During the Ottoman times, through a governing and social system known as the "Maronite-Druze dualism" in Mount Lebanon Mutasarrifate, the earliest internationally recognised autonomous status was given after civil strife between sects. While it is the most known, the Mutasarrifate follows much earlier trends of distinction and varying degrees of autonomy, offering Lebanese nationalism actual basis for the proto-national consciousness it needed to formalise. The ancient Canaanites, Phoenicians, Maronites, Druze, Fakhreddine's expansion into the Ottoman Empire the Ma'an and Sunni Shihab dynasties, the Lebanese Emirate and the Double Qaimaqamate all contributed to Morden-day Lebanese identity.

During the 20th century, the country went through important changes. Acquiring its modern day borders from the French, Greater Lebanon was formed upon the base of the Lebanese, Mount Lebanon. During the Lebanese Civil War, Lebanese nationalism was associated with the Kataeb Party, Lebanese Forces, National Liberal Party and secularist movements like Guardians of the Cedars, National Bloc and the Lebanese Renewal Party, spearheaded by the renowned late Lebanese poet and philosopher Said Akl, who proposed a distinct Lebanese alphabet, contributing to ideas of a separate cultural Lebanese identity. The ideology was also present among the Shiite Muslims of the Amal movement and an ideology present in its armed wing, the Lebanese Resistance Regiments. Currently, it is present among the multi-confessional Lebanese Resistance Brigades subordinate to Hezbollah. As a result, Lebanese nationalists have never formed a bloc, being very different ideologically and having divergent opinions on which allies to choose, all adding up to confessionalism.

Some Lebanese nationalists consider Lebanese borders to go even further to incorporate historical irredentist views that go beyond the modern borders of Lebanon, seeking to unify all the lands of ancient Phoenicia around present-day Lebanon. That comes from the fact that present-day Lebanon, the Mediterranean coast of Syria, and northern Israel is the area that roughly correspond to ancient Phoenicia and so its adherents identify with the ancient Phoenician population of that region. Therefore, the proposed Greater Lebanese nation-state includes Lebanon, Mediterranean coast of Syria, and northern Palestine.

Lebanese Christians historically combined Lebanese nationalism with Christian nationalism and sometimes Phoenicianism.

== Historical events ==
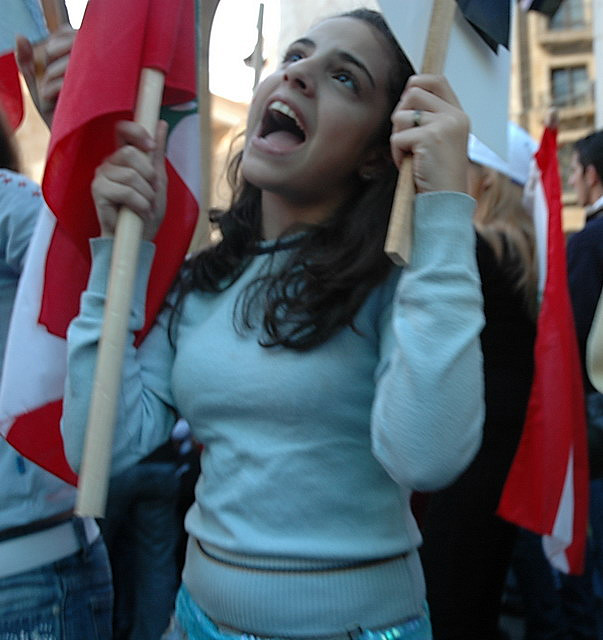
Female protester in Cedar Revolution

In 2005, public discontent with the Syrian occupation of Lebanon intensified with the assassination of Prime Minister Rafik Hariri, leading to mass demonstrations known as the Cedar Revolution. Numerous political parties such as the Future Movement, Lebanese Forces and various Christian parties formed the March 14 Alliance, a coalition opposed to Syrian influence. .

== Notable Lebanese nationalists ==
- Youssef Bey Karam (1823–1889), Christian governor
- Elias Peter Hoayek (1843–1931), Maronite patriarch of Antioch
- Camille Chamoun (1900–1987), President of Lebanon and of the Lebanese NLP
- Pierre Gemayel (1905–1984), politician, founder of the Lebanese nationalist Keateb party and 2nd President of the Lebanese football association
- Said Akl, (1911–2014), poet, philosopher, writer, playwright, and language reformer
- Dany Chamoun (1934–1990), politician
- Etienne Sakr (born 1937), nationalist leader and founder of the Lebanese Ultra Nationalist GOC
- Bachir Gemayel (1947–1982), President of Lebanon, militia commander.
- Rafic Hariri (1944–2005), business man, philanthropist, politician,Prime minister And founder of the Hariri bloc(now known as the Future movement)(1992–98; 2000–04)
- Fairuz Lebanese singer and actress (born 1934 or 1935)
- Musa al Sadr Lebanese-Iranian religious leader and founder of the Amal Movement (June 1928 –?)
- Gebran Tueni Lebanese journalist and politician (1957-2005)
- Pascale Sakr Lebanese singer (born 1964)
- Bechara El Khoury President of Lebanon (1890- 1964)
- Samir Geagea Current Leader of the Lebanese Forces and doctor (born 1952)
- Sethrida Geagea Lebanese MP (Born 1967)
- Fakhr el din Emir of Mount Lebanon (1572- 1635)

== See also ==
- Phoenicianism
- Lebanese history
- Phoenicia
- Carthage
- March 14 alliance
- Lebanese civil war
