= Yifru =

Yifru (Amharic: ይፍሩ) is a patronymic. Notable people with the name include:

- Dawit Yifru, Ethiopian keyboardist
- Ketema Yifru, Ethiopian statesman
