= Rohi Al-Khammash =

Palestinian-Iraqi musician (1923–1998)

- روحي الخمّاش

Personal details
- Born: 1923 Nablus, Mandatory Palestine
- Died: 1998 (aged 74–75) Iraq
- Occupation: Musician and Composer

Rohi al-Khammash (Arabic: روحي الخمّاش; 1923–1998) was an Iraqi musician and composer of Palestinian origin who played a major role in the development and preservation of Iraqi music and the flourishing of the musical movement in Iraq. He founded artistic groups that greatly contributed to the preservation and development of Iraqi artistic heritage, such as the Muwashahat Group in 1948, whose name was changed to “the Sons of the Tigris Group” in 1961, the Iraqi Chanting Group, and the Baghdad Quintet, which later became known as the Quintet of Fine Arts, among other groups that left a distinct mark on art, singing, and Iraqi music during the second half of the twentieth century. He composed the anthem "O God of the Universe," which is a religious supplication associated with the traditions and rituals of Ramadan in Iraq.

== Life ==
Rohi al-Khammash was born in 1923 in Nablus, in occupied Palestine, and grew up there. He began his studies at Al-Khalidiya Elementary School in 1928–1929, and then transferred to Al-Najah School until he graduated. He started his artistic career at an early age, as his father nurtured his talent, sharpened his intelligence, and supported his passion for art and singing. He bought him a small oud when he was only six years old, so he could learn to play and practice on it. He developed a noticeable attachment to his oud and began translating all the musical ideas that crossed his mind onto it with great enthusiasm and passion. One of his relatives supervised and followed his musical performances, as he noticed signs of intelligence and brilliance in his works. This relative was Ahmad Abdulwahid al-Khammash, who had studied music in Turkey. Within one year, Rohi mastered playing maqamat such as "Bashraf Rast Aasem Bey" and "Bashraf Rast Tatyos Efendi," as well as some old melodies and ancient Bayati Sama'i by Sami Al-Shawwa.

Rohi al-Khammash excelled in playing the oud and singing al Adwar and muwashahat at the age of seven. In 1932, an opportunity arose for Rohi to sing in front of the artist Sami Al-Shawwa during the Arab Art Exhibition held in Jerusalem. Al-Shawwa, who was participating with his troupe in the exhibition, was impressed by the voice of this young boy and encouraged him to continue and predicted a promising future for him. It happened that Sami Al-Shawwa listened to Rohi al-Khammash singing "Ahib Ashoufak" by the artist Mohammed Abdel Wahab, and he was impressed by him. Al-Shawwa encouraged him to continue training and performing musical shows, and his artistic engagements continued to increase. This contributed to the advancement of Rohi's artistic career, solidifying it and enhancing his reputation among musical groups.

In 1933, his father presented him as an oud player in front of a large audience from various cities in Palestine and the Arab world. He performed some vocal musical pieces by Mohammed Abdel Wahab and Umm Kulthum. At that time, Abdel Wahab had come to Palestine.

At the age of ten, circumstances led him to stand and sing in front of the Arab singer, Umm Kulthum, during her visit to the city of Jaffa and her performance at the Abu Shakoosh Café Theater in 1933. The young Rohi al-Khammash sang the muwashah "Sakattu Wad-Dumou Takallam" by Mohamed El Qasabgi in front of her.

When he completed elementary school, his reputation had spread throughout his city, and he was known for his excellence and intelligence. In early 1935, news of him reached the ears of Prince Abdullah, who requested him to be invited to Baghdad, the city of authentic civilization, creativity, and great art. King Ghazi received him and Rohi sang for him, just as he had done for Prince Abdullah before. He also performed famous national anthems that impressed King Ghazi and stirred his emotions towards Rohi, leading him to offer his personal watch and a sum of money as a token of his admiration and appreciation for Rohi's keen talent. Undoubtedly, this had a significant impact on the personality of the young boy. King Ghazi hosted young Rohi in Iraq for six months during which Rohi performed numerous concerts for school students.

Upon the opening of the Palestinian Radio Station in 1936, he returned to his homeland once again where he took part as an artist, producer, and presenter of a program where he performed his singing concerts for a year. In 1937/1938, he embarked on a study mission to Cairo at the King Fuad I Institute of Arabic Music. His goal was to refine his talent and gain valuable experience, training, and required academic expertise. He underwent an admission test at the institute, conducted by a committee consisting of professors: Darwish Al-Hariri, Safar Bek Ali (the technical assistant), Dr. Mahmoud Ahmed Al-Hafni (the administrative assistant), Mr. Kousnaks (the music notation - Solfège and music theory teacher), and Fouad Al-Iskandarani (the singing teacher). Rohi graduated with distinction from the institute in 1939 and returned to Palestine to work there.

In 1939, he relocated to Jerusalem and was appointed as the head of the music ensemble at the Palestinian Radio Station, where he continued his work until 1948. Rohi Al-Khammash graduated from the Eastern Music Institute in 1943 and subsequently returned to Nablus to study music for a brief period. He later moved to Damascus, where he began composing music.

== Fifty years in Baghdad ==
During the Palestinian Nakba in 1948, the Palestinian Broadcasting Station came under attack, and its building in the Talbiya neighborhood in West Jerusalem was destroyed. As a result, Rohi Al-Khammash returned to his hometown of Nablus. Following this, he was summoned by the Iraqi military governor of Nablus, Tahir Al-Zubaidi, who praised his patriotic role and talent and thanked him for his participation in organizing several musical performances for the Iraqi army. Al-Zubaidi proposed the idea of Rohi's visiting Baghdad and granted him a military permit to facilitate his journey to Iraq. Rohi traveled to Baghdad accompanied by a group of Iraqi artists who were present in Palestine at that time to perform artistic events in Iraqi military bases stationed in Palestine. Al-Khammash arrived in Baghdad in July 1948, along with his sisters Dunia and Firdous, in an Iraqi military vehicle.

In Baghdad, Rohi Al-Khammash found a wider horizon for artistic work and found himself delving into a rich artistic and vocal heritage that was not available to him during his time in Jerusalem. Such that he directly took over the leadership of the evening music ensemble at the Baghdad Radio station where he was employed. This ensemble performed its songs and musical compositions live on air every evening. He was credited with establishing and developing the music department at the radio station and enriching it with professional musical talents.

While in Baghdad, Rohi Al-Khammash reunited with his renowned Arabic muwashahat teacher, Sheikh Ali Al-Darwish, whom he had learned a lot from during their collaboration at the Jerusalem Radio. Together in Baghdad, they founded the Andalusian Muwashahat ensemble, with Al-Darwish being in his eighties while Al-Khammash was only twenty-five. Additionally, Al-Khammash worked as a professor teaching oud at the Institute of Fine Arts in Baghdad in 1953.

Al-Khammash played a significant role in the development and preservation of Iraqi music during a period of flourishing musical movement there. He established artistic ensembles that contributed greatly to the preservation and development of Iraqi artistic heritage. Among the ensembles and musical chant groups that he either founded or played a key role in establishing were the Muwashahat Ensemble in 1948 (which later changed its name in 1961 to Sons of the Tigris Ensemble, the Second Muwashahat Ensemble), and the Iraqi Chanting Ensemble, among other ensembles that left a clear mark on the journey of art, singing, and music in Iraq.

Rohi was a skillful oud player, had a beautiful voice, and was a creative composer and musician. In the field of composition, he composed melodies for thirty muwashahat pieces, including "Hat Ya Mahboubi Ka'asi" (Give me, my beloved, my cup), "Ya Malihan Bil-Tathanni", and "Ajafwaton Am Dalal". He also composed seven religious hymns, including "Labbaika Qad Labbaito Lak", "Ya Man Yahar Al-Mar'u Min Qudratika", and "Hikmat Al-Sawm". Furthermore, he composed eight patriotic songs, including "Watan Wahid”, "Akhi Al-Arabi", and "Jaish Awatani Al-Muzaffar".

In the field of musical composition, he created four samaiyat and one longa, which is a fast and lively musical piece. He also composed seventeen musical compositions, including "Shamm Al-Naseem", "Difaf Dijla" (The Banks of the Tigris), and "Afrah Al-Shabab" (The Joys of Youth).

== Addition of the seventh string to the oud ==
The relationship between Al-Khammash and the oud is a longstanding one that dates back to his early childhood years. He studied oud-playing academically and eventually became a professor teaching oud. He often pondered on improving the performance of this musical instrument that had accompanied him throughout his life. He added the seventh string to achieve the full range of sounds allowed by the oud, making it easier for him to play, enhance his technique, and improvise melodies. The addition of the seventh string to the oud is considered a significant musical achievement that distinguished Al-Khammash. The importance of this accomplishment lies in providing musicians with ample space to explore a wide musical range and showcase musical phrases in their utmost beauty.

In the late 1970s, Rohi Al-Khamash retired from the arts and purchased agricultural land in Latifiya, a suburb of Baghdad. However, he couldn't resist the calls and insistence of fellow artists, and it was inevitable for him to return once again. Upon his return, he became an oud teacher at the Institute of Melodic Studies and held the same position in the afternoon at the Iraqi Maqam House. He continued in these roles until the end of his life. During that time, he also devoted himself to his agricultural land, establishing farms for poultry, birds, and cattle, maintaining the rural tradition of his family. He resided on his land from 1986 until 1998. In mid-1998, he was surprised by the onset of an incurable illness. He was hospitalized and remained there until his passing on Tuesday, the 10th of Jumada al-Awwal, 1418 hijri (corresponding to the 30th of August 1998). The Iraqi Artists Syndicate held a befitting funeral for the great artist, and he was buried in the Karakh Cemetery, located west of Baghdad.
