= Awit =

Awit may refer to:

- Awit Award, music awards given annually by the Philippine Association of the Record Industry
- Awit (poem), a Filipino poetry form
- Akl Awit (born 1952), Lebanese journalist
