= AKL =

AKL may refer to:

- Alpha Kappa Lambda, US collegiate fraternity
- Auckland Airport, New Zealand (IATA code AKL)
- Air Kiribati's ICAO code
- A US Navy hull classification symbol: Small cargo ship (AKL)
- Dry cargo support ships in the list of active Indonesian Navy ships
- Assyrian King List

== See also ==
- Akl
