= Lebanese Resistance Brigades =

Lebanese paramilitary group affiliated with Hezbollah

Lebanese Resistance Companies; Saraya al-Moukawama al-Lubnaniyya
- سرايا المقاومة اللبنانية
- Leader: Mohammed Aknan (Beirut); Mohammad Saleh (Sidon) †
- Dates active: 1997–2000; 2009–present
- Active regions: Southern Lebanon, particularly Sidon
- Ideology: Lebanese nationalism; Confessionalism; Anti-Zionism
- Size: Unknown
- Part of: Hezbollah

The Lebanese Resistance Companies (Arabic: سرايا المقاومة اللبنانية; Saraya al-Muqawama al-Lubnaniya), commonly referred to as the Lebanese Resistance Brigades is a non-denominational Lebanese paramilitary group affiliated with Hezbollah. The group is an irregular militia that is composed of Shia and Sunni Muslims, Christians, and Druze who subscribe to Lebanese nationalism and strong anti-Zionist beliefs. The Resistance Companies are funded, trained, armed, and founded by Hezbollah. The group's manpower, composition, and strength are unclear.

The group was founded in 1997 to counter Israel, but its focus has since expanded to countering Sunni extremists like ISIL as well.

== Founding ==
The Resistance Companies were founded to increase the manpower of anti-Israeli forces in Lebanon and to deny Israel freedom of movement in non-Shia areas. West Point's Combating Terrorism Center reports that the Resistance Companies were founded in November 1997, while other sources claim early 1990s, 2004, or 2009.

== Training ==
Resistance Companies members are trained in Hezbollah-run camps alongside normal Hezbollah recruits. However, they do not receive Hezbollah's ideological training. A recruiter described the group as "made for non-extremist people." The militia is popular among Christians in Beqaa Valley and north Lebanon.

== History ==
The Companies first saw combat in 1998 during the South Lebanon conflict (1985–2000). They claim to have engaged in over three hundred operations before Israel withdrew from southern Lebanon in 2000. The group was also involved in the 2006 Lebanon War with Israel.

The militia is described as an "operational auxiliary" or subsidiary of Hezbollah. Group members fight under the Hezbollah flag and command structure in combat, but are at least nominally separate in peacetime. They also receive intelligence from Hezbollah.

=== Involvement in Syria ===
Resistance Companies units have been involved in the Syrian Civil War. They do not engage in combat but rather support Hezbollah logistically and act as interlocutors between Hezbollah and Christian and Sunni communities. Despite this, some fighters have been killed in Syria.

=== Israel–Hezbollah conflict (2023–present) ===
The Companies have been involved in the ongoing Hezbollah-Israel conflict (2023-present). Some members of the group were killed during clashes with Israeli forces in October 2023. In July 2024, the Brigades conducted their first military operations against Israel, using missiles to strike sites in the Israeli-occupied Shebaa Farms.

== Equipment ==
Model	Type	Quantity	Acquired	Origin	Notes
AK-47	Assault rifle	unknown	Hezbollah	Soviet Union	
9M14 Malyutka	ATGM	unknown	Hezbollah	Soviet Union	
Technical	Improvised fighting vehicle	unknown	Hezbollah	Lebanon	

== Criticism ==
Resistance Companies fighters are less disciplined and subject to less strict rules than Hezbollah fighters. Consequently, the brigades have been involved in a large number of violent confrontations with police, the Lebanese Army, and various Lebanese partisans. Lebanese Interior Minister Nohad Machnouk, member of the Future Movement, criticized the group for challenging the sovereignty of the Lebanese government.

Critics contend that the group is no longer focused on fighting Israel, but rather exists as political cover for Hezbollah's actions and as a containment group for thugs and troublemakers. Likewise, some Sunnis have charged the Resistance Brigades with focusing more on countering Sunni fundamentalism than Israel.

The Resistance Companies have also been accused of converting Sunni youth to Shia Islam, a charge the group denies.
