= Said Akl =

Lebanese poet and language reformer (1911–2014)

- سعيد عقل; Saýid Ýaql
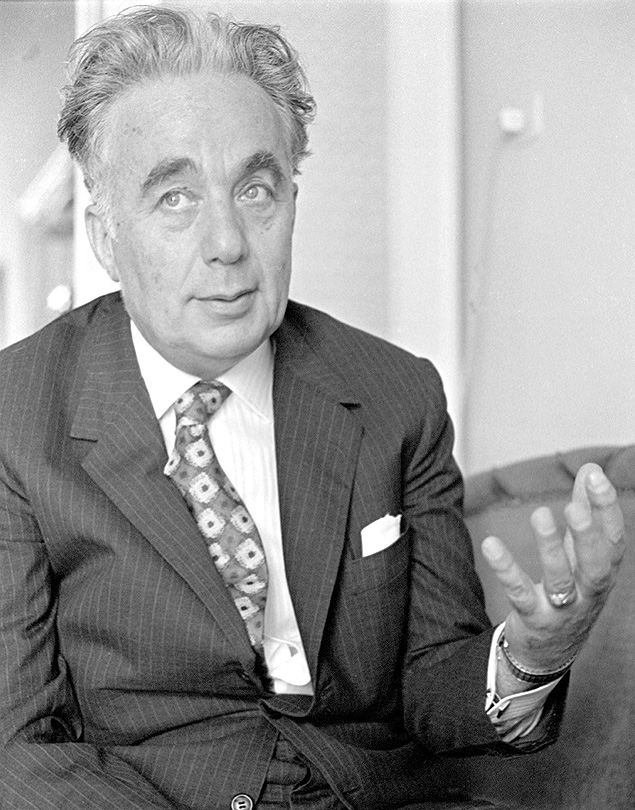
- Born: July 1911; Zahlé, Beirut Vilayet, Ottoman Empire
- Died: 28 November 2014 (aged 103); Beirut, Lebanon
- Occupations: Poet; writer; philosopher; linguist; ideologue
- Writing career
- Language: Lebanese Arabic; Modern Standard Arabic; Classical Arabic
- Genres: Poetry; prose; play
- Movement: Symbolism

Said Akl (Note: Also transliterated as Saïd Akl, Said Aql and Saeed Akl.) (Arabic: سعيد عقل, romanized: Saʿīd ʿAql; 4 July 1911 – 28 November 2014) was a Lebanese poet, linguist, philosopher, writer, playwright and language reformer. He is considered one of the most important Lebanese poets of the modern era. He is most famous for his advocacy on behalf of codifying the spoken Lebanese Arabic language as completely distinct from Standard Arabic, to be written in a modern modified Roman script consisting of 36 symbols that he deemed an evolution of the Phoenician alphabet. Despite this, he contributed to several literary movements (primarily, symbolism) in Modern Standard Arabic, producing some of the masterpieces of modern Arabic belle lettres.

Akl aligned himself with Lebanese nationalism, and was one of the founding members of the Lebanese Renewal Party in 1972. The party, characterized by its pro-Phoenicianism stance, aimed to distance Lebanon from Pan-Arabism. His views found support within the Guardians of the Cedars movement.

His writings include poetry and prose both in Lebanese Arabic and in Classical Arabic. He has also written theatre pieces and authored lyrics for many popular songs, such as "Meshwar" ("Trip"), and the classical "Shal" ("Scarf"), the latter of which was composed by the Rahbani brothers and sung by Fairuz, and which Egyptian composer and singer Abdel Wahab described as "the most beautiful poem composed into a song in Arabic music".

== Personal life ==
Akl was born in 1911 (although some sources say 1912) to a Maronite family in the city of Zahlé, then under the administration of the Beirut Vilayet in the Ottoman Lebanon. After losing his father at the age of 15, he had to drop out of school to support his family and later worked as a teacher and then as a journalist. He then studied theology, literature and Islamic history, becoming a university instructor and subsequently lecturing in a number of Lebanese universities, educational and policy institutes.

He died in Beirut, Lebanon at the age of 103.

== Ideology ==
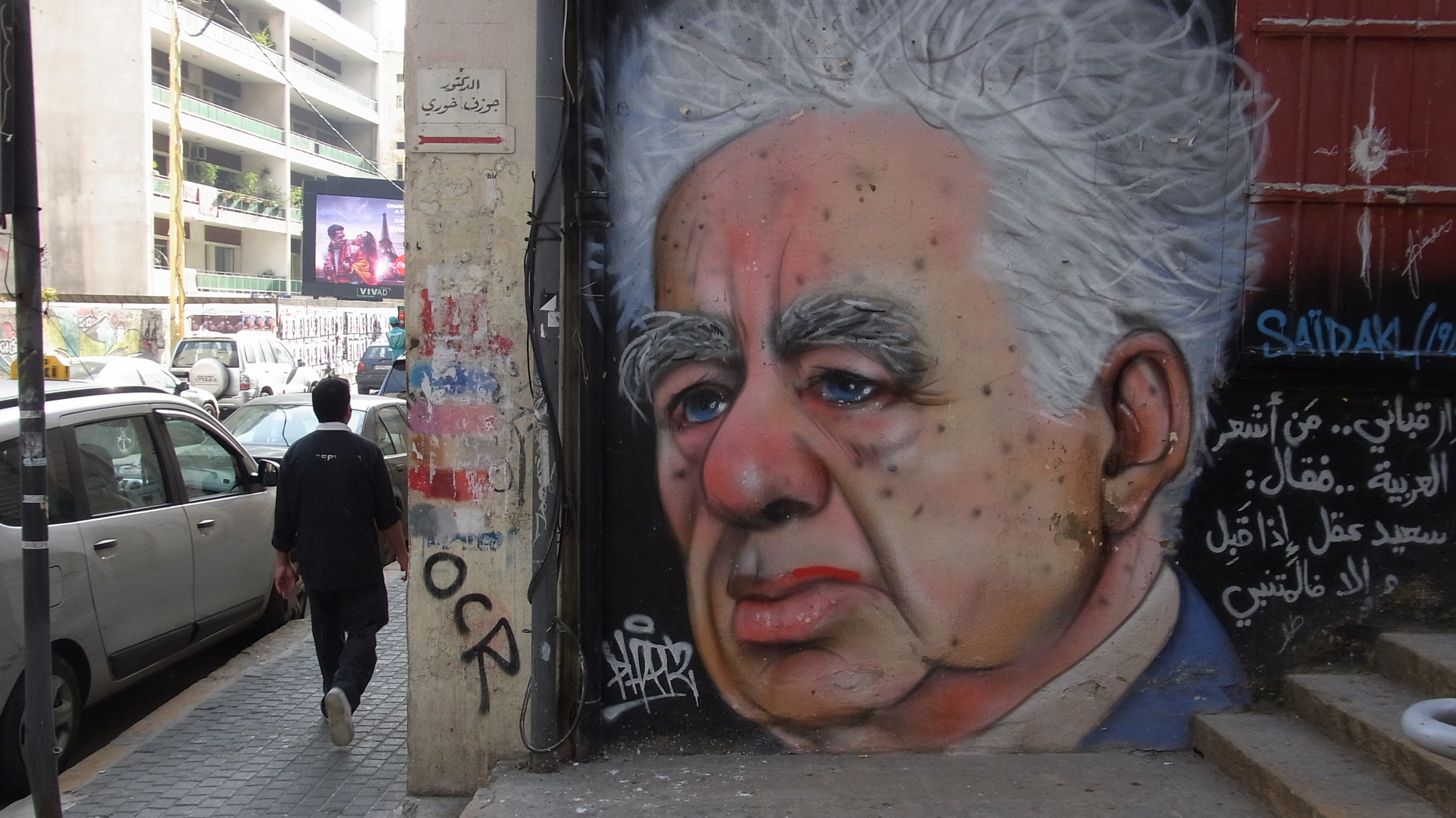
Portrayal of poet Said Akl in the Beirut district of Gemmayzeh

During his early years, Akl was an adherent of the Syrian Social Nationalist Party led by Antun Saadeh, eventually being expelled by Saadeh due to irreconcilable ideological disputes.

Akl adopted a powerful doctrine of the authentic millennial character of Lebanon resonating with an exalted sense of Lebanese dignity. His admiration to the Lebanese history and culture was marked by strong enmity towards an Arab identity of Lebanon. He was quoted saying, “I would cut off my right hand just not to be an Arab”. In 1968 he stated that literary Arabic would vanish from Lebanon.

He is known for his radical Lebanese nationalist sentiments; in 1972, he helped found the Lebanese Renewal Party, which was proposed by May Murr, a well known writer and researcher of ancient Lebanese history and a staunch supporter of Akl. This party was based on Lebanese nationalism. During the Lebanese Civil War, Akl served as the spiritual leader of the Lebanese Christian far-right ultranationalist movement Guardians of the Cedars, which was led by Étienne Saqr.

During the 1982 Lebanon War, He said in an interview about the Israeli army during the Second Israeli invasion of Lebanon "there is only one step, that this hero (Israeli army) is to clean Lebanon from every last Palestinian...ever since the Israeli army entered Lebanon, all of Lebanon was supposed to fight with them, I would myself fight with the Israeli army" and "who ever says about the Israeli army that it's an invading army should have his head decapitated"

In a 1996 interview, he mentioned: "The Arab–Israeli conflict should have been called the Palestinian–Foreign conflict, not Palestinian–Jewish conflict, since there are Jews in Palestine, and those are welcome, but you foreign Jew, you should go back to Poland, Germany, France, go back to your home, and any Jew who wants to live with us Palestinians is welcome, and we are not Arabs, we are only Palestinians [...] and know that Said Akl will fight Israel, while other Arabs will make peace with Israel."

For Akl Lebanon was the cradle of culture and the inheritor of the Oriental civilization, well before the arrival of the Arabs on the historical stage. He emphasized the Phoenician legacy of the Lebanese people, aligning with Phoenicianism.

== Lebanese language and alphabet ==
Said Akl's book Yara and an excerpt from the book in his proposed Lebanese alphabet

Akl was an ideologue for promotion of the Lebanese language as independent of Arabic language. Although acknowledging the influence of Arabic, he argued that Lebanese language was equally if not more influenced by Phoenician languages and promoted the use of the Lebanese language written in a modified Latin alphabet, rather than the Arabic one.

He designed an alphabet for the Lebanese language using the Latin alphabet in addition to a few newly designed letters and some accented Latin letters to suit the Lebanese phonology. The proposed Lebanese alphabet designed by Akl contained 36 letters. The proposed alphabet was as follows:

position		Arabic graph	Akl graph	Classical name	Akl Levantine name
Akl	Hijā'ī	Arabic graph	Akl graph	Classical name	Akl Levantine name
1	1	ا	C with lower-left diagonal stroke	’alif	c*aleef
2	2	ب	B	bā’	be
3	2	پ*	P	(pā’)	pe
4	3	ت	capital T, lower-case t without left stroke	tā’	t*e
4	4	ث	[merges with te]	thā’	t*e
5	16	ط	capital T with left stroke, lower-case t	ṭā’	taah
6	5	ج	J	jīm	jiin
7	6	ح	X	ḥā’	xe
8	7	خ	K	khā’	ke
9	8	د	D	dāl	daal
9	9	ذ	[merges with daal]	dhāl	daal
10	15	ض	D with gap at top (lower-case like ⟨cl⟩ joined at bottom)	ḍād	d*aad
11	10	ر	R	rā’	re
12	11	ز	Z	zāyy	zayn
13	17	ظ	Z with left stroke	ẓā’	z*aah
14	12	س	S	sīn	siin
15	14	ص	S with top removed	ṣād	s*aad
16	13	ش	C	shīn	ciin
17	18	ع	Y with left arm curved clockwise	‘ayn	y*ayn
18	19	غ	G	ghayn	gayn
19	21	ق	G with gap at top	qāf	g*e
20	20	ف	F	fā’	fe
21	20	ڤ*	V	(vā’)	ve
22	22	ك	Q	kāf	qaaf
23	23	ل	L	lām	laam
24	24	م	M	mīm	miim
25	25	ن	N	nūn	nuun
26	26	ه	H	hā’	he
27	27	و	W	wāw	waaw
28	30	ـَ	A	fatḥah	a
29	33	ـَا	A with left stroke	fatḥah ’alif	a*
30	31	ـِ	I	kasrah	i
30	34	ـِي	I with left stroke	kasrah yā’	i*, i (word finally)
31	36	ـَي	E	fatḥah yā’	e
32	29	ـَ	E with truncation	fatḥah	e*
33	37	ـَو	O	fatḥah wāw	o
34	32	ـُ	U	ḍammah	u
35	35	ـُو	U with left stroke	ḍammah wāw	u*, u (word finally)
36	28	ي	Y	yā’	ye

Note: پ and ڤ are not part of the Standard Arabic alphabet and they are only optionally used when transcribing foreign words.

Starting in the 1970s Akl offered a prize to whoever authored the best essay in Lebanese. Since then the Said Akl awards have been granted to many Lebanese intellectuals and artists. He published his poetry book Yara completely using his proposed Lebanese alphabet, thus becoming the first book ever to be published in this form. In later years, he also published his poetry book Khumasiyyat in the same alphabet.

LEBNAAN in proposed Said Akl alphabet (issue #686)

LEBNAAN in Lebanese using Arabic alphabet (9 February 1977 issue)

Akl published the tabloid newspaper Lebnaan using the Lebanese language. It was published in two versions, لبنان (transliteration and pronunciation Lubnan which means Lebanon in Arabic language) using Lebanese written in traditional Arabic alphabet, the other Lebnaan (Lebanese for Lebanon) in his proposed Lebanese Latin-based alphabet.

== Works ==
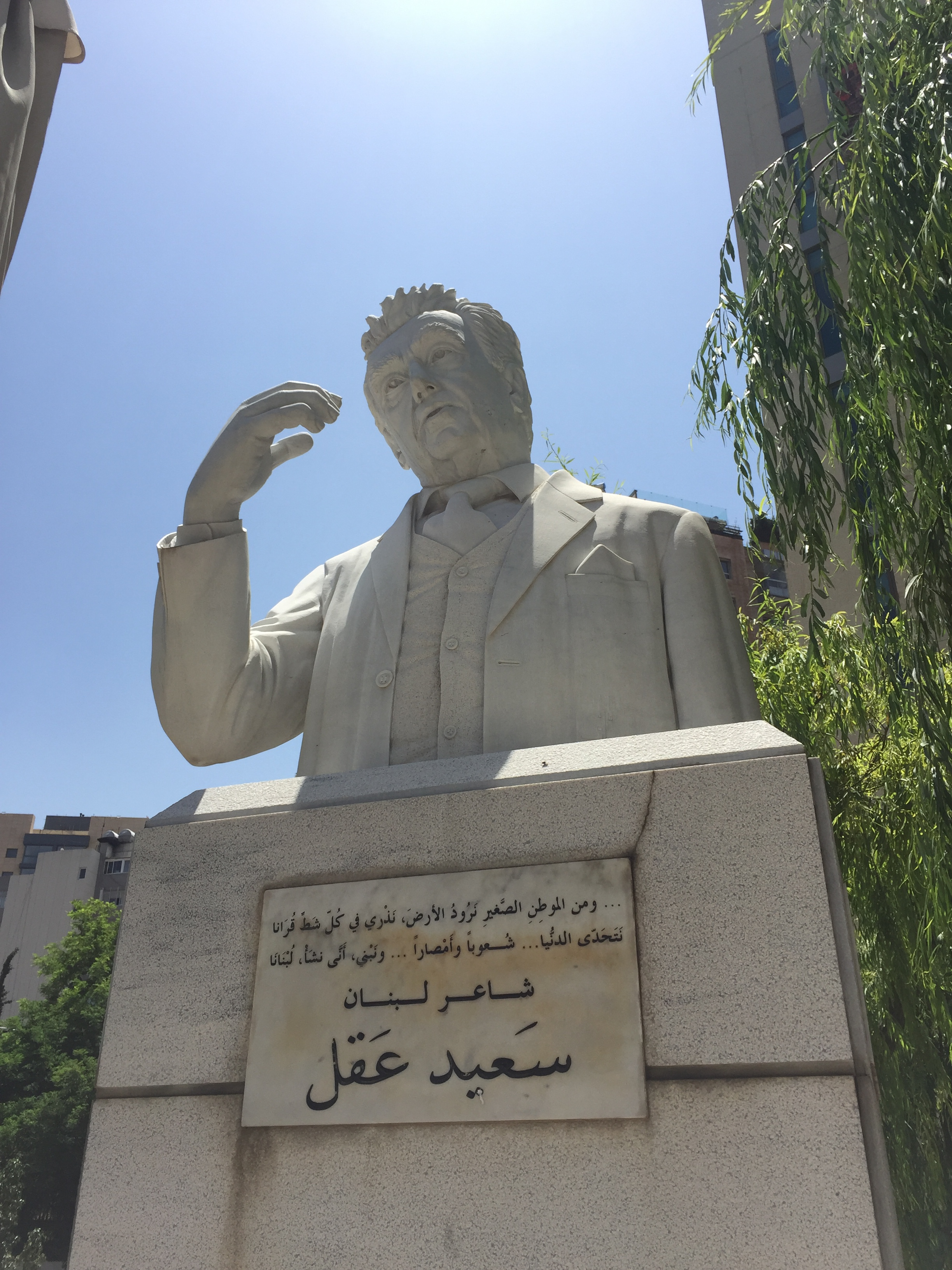
Said Akl's statue in the American University of Science and Technology's campus in Beirut

Akl has numerous writings ranging from theatrical plays, epics, poetry and song lyrics. His first published work was released in 1935, a theatrical play written in Arabic. His works are written in either Lebanese, literary Arabic, or French.

=== Poems and plays ===
- 1935: Bint Yiftah (بنت يفتاح, titled after Jephthah's daughter) – theatrical play
- 1937: Al Majdaliyyah (المجدليّة) – epic
- 1944: Qadmos (قدموس) – theatrical play
- 1950: "Rindalah" (رندلى) – poem
- 1954: "Mushkilat al Nukhba" (مشكلة النخبة) – poem
- 1960: "Ajmal minik...? La!" (!أجمل منك...؟ لا) – poem
- 1960: "Lubnaan in haka" (لبنان إن حكى) – poem
- 1961: "Ka's el Khamr" (كأس الخمر) – poem
- 1961: "Yara" (using his designed Lebanese alphabet; Arabic script: يارا) – poem
- 1961: "Ajraas al Yasmeen" (أجراس الياسمين) – poem
- 1972: Kitab al Ward (كتاب الورد) – poetry collection
- 1979: Qasaed min Daftari (قصائد من دفتري) – poetry collection
- 1974: Kama al A'mida (كما الأعمدة) – poetry collection
- 1978: Khumasiyyat (using his designed Lebanese alphabet; Arabic script: خماسيّات) – poetry collection
- 1981: poems in French.

=== Songwriting ===
- Akl proposed the lyrics for an anthem for the pan-Syrian Syrian Social Nationalist Party, but this was rejected by its founder Antun Saadeh, who proposed another anthem for the party that he had written in prison. When asked about what he wrote, Akl denied writing it, and said that it was a certain Wadih Khalil Nasrallah (a relative of Akl by marriage) who wrote the lyrics.
- Akl wrote the anthem of another pan-Arab movement, the "Association of the Firmest Bond" (جمعية العروة الوثقى, Jamīʿiyyat al-ʿUrwa al-Wuthqā).
- Akl has also written poems that were turned into pan-Arab anthem songs with music by the Rahbani brothers and sung by the Lebanese diva Fairuz. These include "Zahrat al-Mada'en" about Jerusalem, "Ghannaytou Makkah" (غنّيتُ مكة) about Mecca (written upon Fairuz's request) and "Saailiini ya Sham" (سائليني يا شام) about Damascus, as well as "Ruddani ila biladi" (ردني إلى بلادي) about Lebanon and "Ummi ya malaki" (أمي يا ملاكي) about his mother.

=== Media ===
Said Akl wrote as a journalist in a number of publications, notably the Lebanese Al-Jarida newspaper and the weekly Al-Sayyad magazine. In the 1990s, Akl also wrote a front-page personal column in the Lebanese As-Safir newspaper.

== See also ==
- Phoenicianism
- Guardians of the Cedars
- Lebanese Arabic
