= Phoenicianism =

Form of Lebanese nationalism

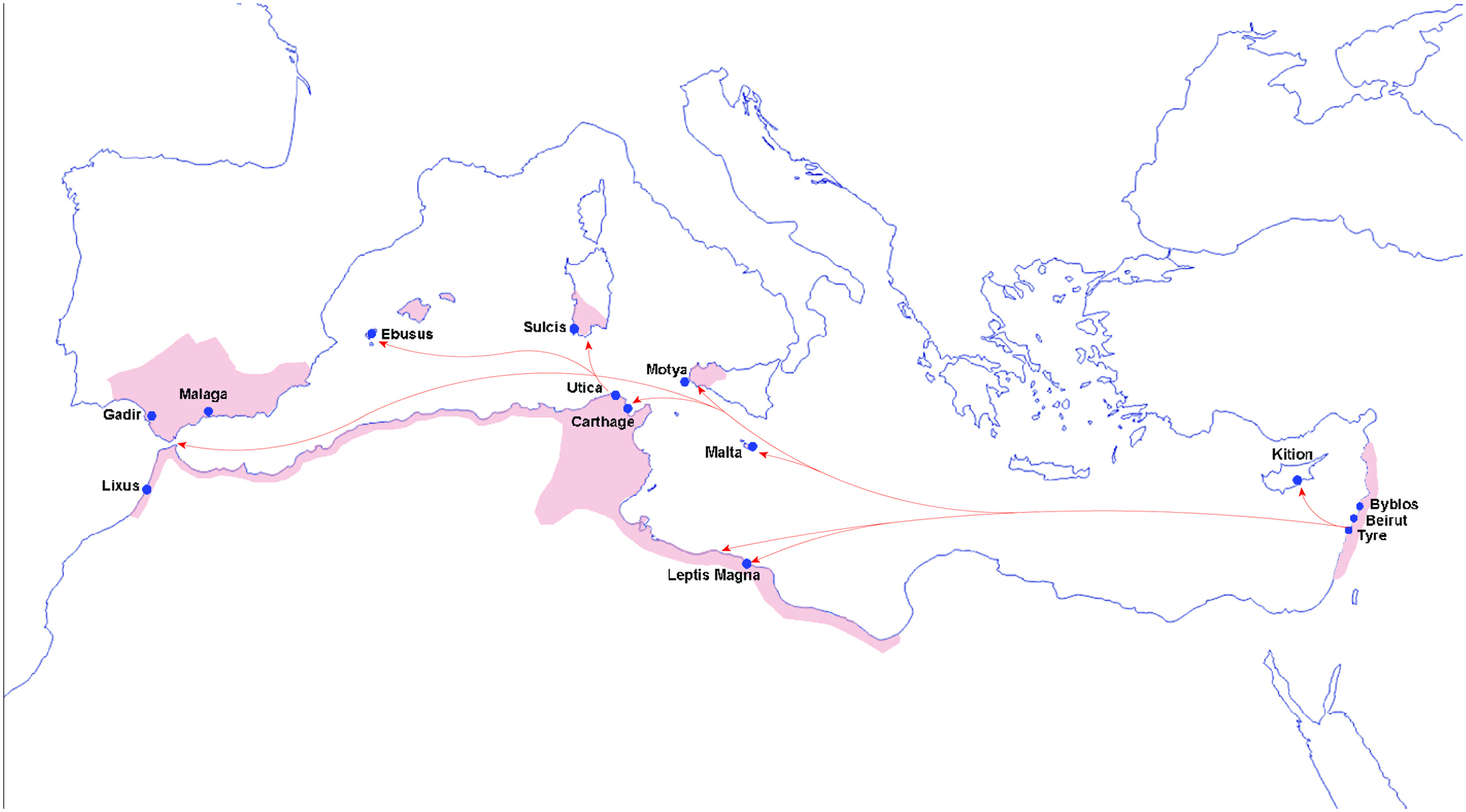
Map showing the maritime expansions of the Phoenician civilization across the Mediterranean Basin, starting from around 800 BC

Phoenicianism is a form of Lebanese nationalism that places ancient Phoenicia as the chief ethno-cultural foundation of the Lebanese people. It is juxtaposed against the Arabization of Lebanon following the early Muslim conquests in the 7th century, and as such opposes pan-Arabism and pan-Islamism, and also seeks to resist Syrian influence on the Lebanese political and cultural spheres.

Within Lebanon, the Phoenicianist ideology has most notably garnered support among Lebanese Christians, especially the Maronites. Adopted by Christian intellectuals upon the creation of the French-administered State of Greater Lebanon, Phoenicianism has been endorsed by a number of prominent Lebanese figures, such as the Maronite poet Saïd Akl, and by political organizations like the Lebanese Renewal Party, which was succeeded by the Guardians of the Cedars. It was a popular viewpoint among Christian political-military factions during the Lebanese Civil War.

== History ==
=== Background ===
Phoenicia was an ancient Semitic civilization originating in the coastal strip of the Levant region of the eastern Mediterranean, primarily located in modern Lebanon. The Phoenicians were organized in city-states along the northern Levantine coast, including Tyre, Sidon and Byblos. A seafaring people, they established colonies such as Carthage, Utica and Cadiz. The Phoenicians foremost legacy lies in the creation of the world's oldest verified alphabet. Phoenician expertise also encompassed shipbuilding and navigation, and they were renowned for their extensive international trade network. The Bible documents the connections between the Phoenicians and the Israelite kings, highlighting their notable contributions in cedarwood and craftsmanship for Solomon's Temple.

=== Early influences ===
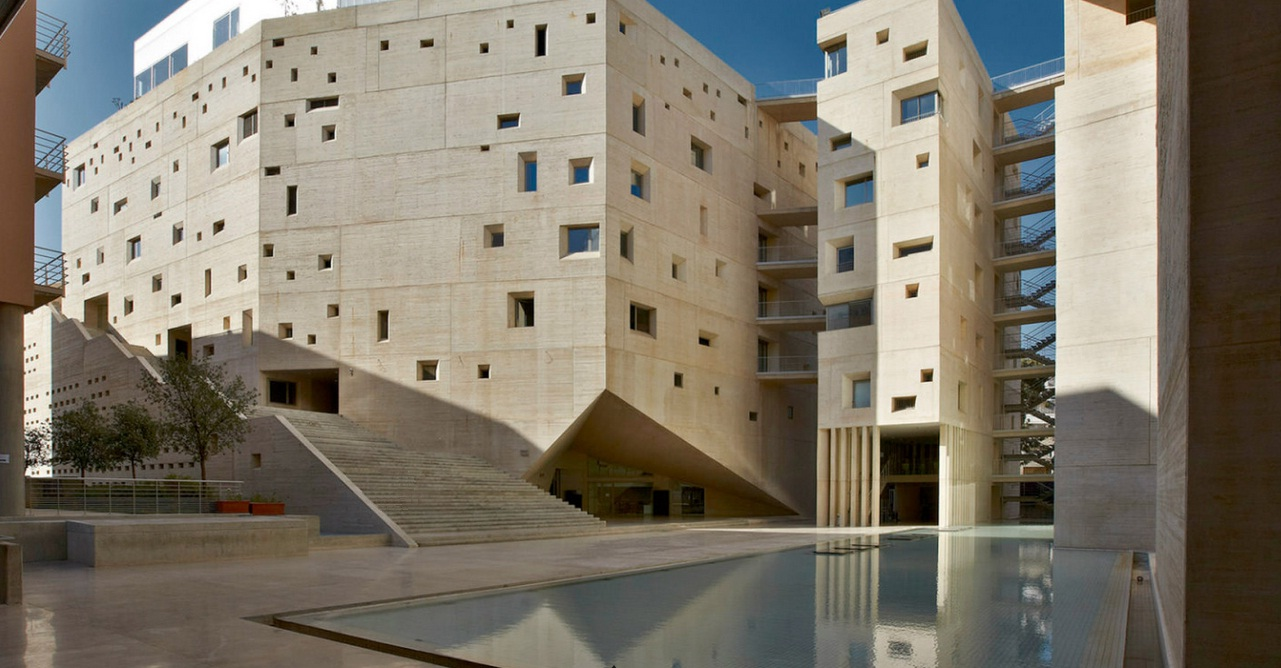
The Saint Joseph University, an institution central to higher learning in Lebanon.

The emergence of Phoenicianism in Syrian and Lebanese intellectual circles can be traced back to the mid-19th century, influenced by Western education, and missionary activities. This era also saw significant French influence, culminating in France's intervention during the 1860 civil conflict in Mount Lebanon, positioning the Maronites as key allies in Lebanon. This period was marked by the arrival of figures such as Ernest Renan, a philologist who conducted extensive excavations along the Lebanese coast, aiming to unearth Semitic texts and relics. His work, part of a broader French scientific and cultural interest in the region, laid the foundation of the popularization of Phoenician studies.

The emergence of Phoenicianism was also influenced by the Jesuits, primarily through their educational institutions, such as Saint Joseph University. By focusing on the ancient history of the region and emphasizing the region's Phoenician heritage, they shaped the intellectual and cultural landscape. This approach helped to disseminate and reinforce the idea of a unique Lebanese identity connected to its Phoenician past, distinct from the surrounding Arab culture.

The Maronite Church's role in the development of Lebanese national consciousness and Phoenicianism is complex. Historically, the Maronite Church focused its history and relationship with Roman Catholicism rather than pre-Christian heritage. This approach is evidence in the works of Maronite clergymen, who were active in the 19th century, such as Nicolas Murad and Abbe Azar, whose narratives began with the rise of Christianity. It was non-clerical intellectuals, many educated in Europe, who later connected Lebanese identity to ancient Phoenician heritage. These intellectuals, not strictly Maronite, were pivotal in popularizing Phoenicianism, integrating the ancient Phoenician past into the modern Lebanese identity narrative.

A key figure in this early phase was Tannus al-Shidyaq. Born into a Maronite family with strong connections to Western missions, al-Shidyaq's works, especially Kitab Akhbar al-A'yan fi Jabal Lubnan (1857–1859), demonstrated a shift from traditional cleric historiography to a secular narrative. His writings included accounts of notable families in Mount Lebanon, indicating a move towards a secular understanding of history that integrated Phoenician elements.

The Nahda movement, a cultural renaissance centered in Beirut which included figures such as Butrus al-Bustani, played an important role in reviving interest in the region's pre-Arab-Islamic era. The Syrian Society for the Acquisition of Sciences, formed in 1847, became a platform for propagating ideas about Syria's history, emphasizing the Phoenician legacy. Publications such as al-Muqtataf and al-Hilal, produced by Lebanese emigrants, were instrumental in spreading information about the ancient Phoenicians. Articles and discussions in these journals from the 1880s onwards indicate that the Phoenician subject was gaining traction in public consciousness. Al-Muqtataf published articles in the 1880s and 1890s that provided scholarly knowledge about the Phoenicians, highlighting their commercial prowess and suggesting genealogical connections to modern people in the region.

The interest in Phoenician history during this period was not confined to Christian communities but was evident across various ethnic and religious group in the region of Syria. This fascination was part of a larger trend to establish a secular identity based on culture, history and geography, with Phoenician history providing a unifying and illustrious past.

== Language ==
=== Arabic ===
The Arabic language is considered to exist in multiple forms: the one spoken in Lebanon is called "Lebanese Arabic" or simply "Lebanese", and it is a type of Levantine Arabic. The point of controversy between Phoenicianists and their opponents lies in whether the differences between the Arabic varieties are sufficient to consider them separate languages as opposed to varieties of one language. The former could cite Prof. Franck Salameh of Boston College: "Arabic is also a multitude of speech forms [...] differing from each other and from the standard language itself to the same extent that French is different from other Romance languages and from Latin", or former Harvard professor Wheeler Thackston, that "a Moroccan and an Iraqi can no more understand each other’s dialects than can a Portuguese and Rumanian."

=== Aramaic ===
For nearly a thousand years before the spread of the Arab-Muslim conquests in the 7th century AD, Aramaic was the lingua franca and main spoken language in the Fertile Crescent. Among the Maronites, traditionally, Western Aramaic had been the spoken language up to the 17th century, when Arabic took its place, while Classical Syriac remained in use only for liturgical purposes, as a sacred language (also considered as such in Judaism, alongside Hebrew).

Today the vast majority of people in Lebanon speak Lebanese Arabic as their first language. More recently, some effort has been put into revitalizing Aramaic as an everyday spoken language in some Maronite communities. Also, the modern languages of Eastern Aramaic have an estimated 2–5 million speakers, mainly among Assyrians, an ethnic group related to but distinct from the Maronites of Lebanon.

== Genetics of the Lebanese people ==
According to genetic studies performed on the Lebanese population, the Lebanese share more than 90% of their genetic makeup with the ancient Canaanites who lived 3,700 years ago.

== Religion ==
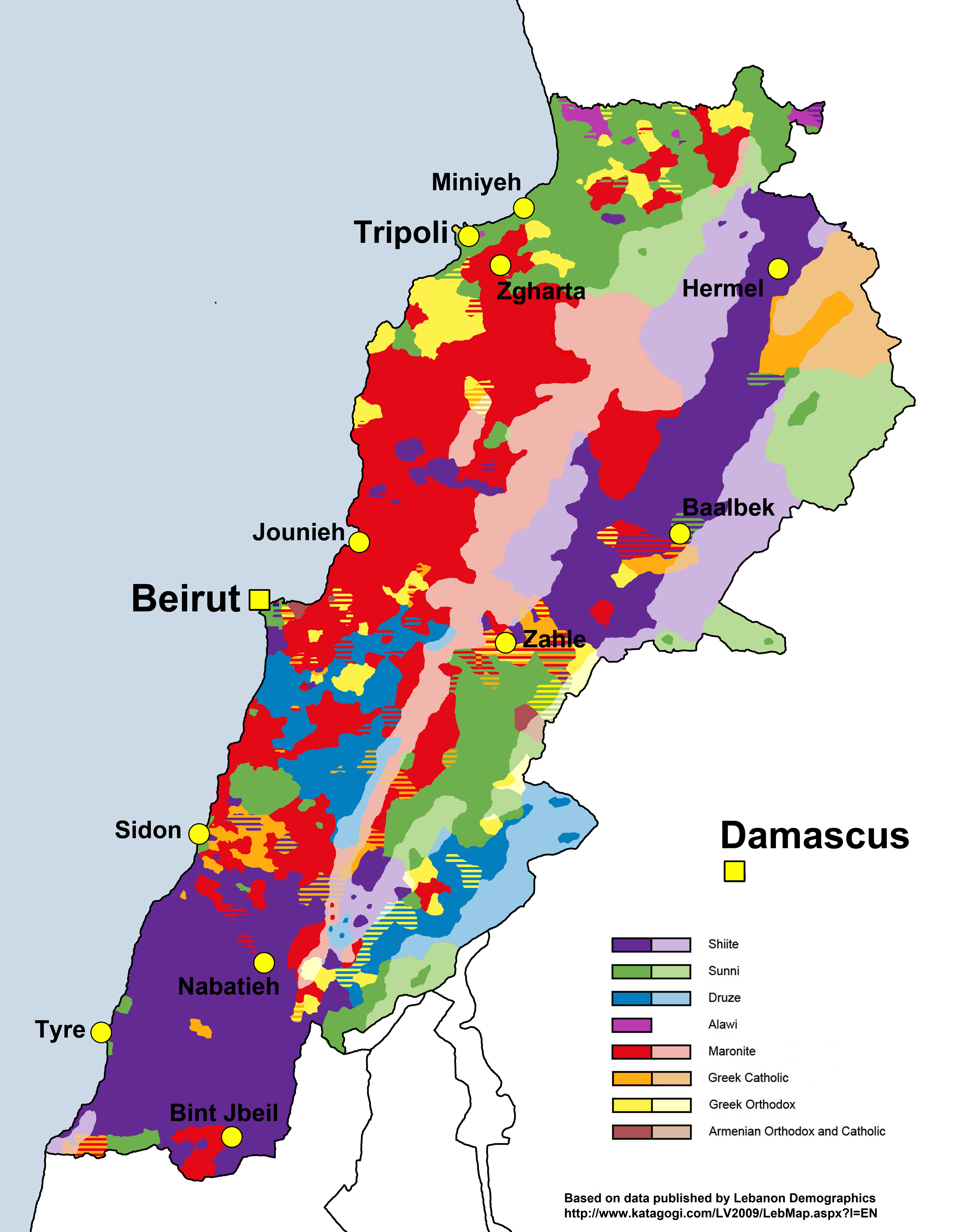
Distribution of different Lebanese religious groups according to municipal election in 2009

Proponents of Phoenician continuity among Maronite Christians point out that a Phoenician identity, including the worship of pre-Christian Phoenician gods such as El, Baal, Astarte and Adon was still in evidence until the mid 6th century AD in Roman Phoenice, and was only gradually replaced by Christianity during the 4th and 5th centuries AD. Furthermore, that all this happened centuries before the Arab-Islamic Conquest.

== Representation ==
Among political parties professing Phoenicianism is the Kataeb Party, a Lebanese nationalist party in the March 14 Alliance. It is officially secular, but its electorate is primarily Christian. Other political parties which profess Phoenicianism include the National Liberal Party and the Lebanese Forces.

== Criticism ==
Josephine Quinn, an associate professor in ancient history at Worcester College, University of Oxford, writes that:

Despite claims by various partisans of Lebanese... nationalism to enlist the Phoenicians as their ancient progenitor, the Phoenicians never existed as a self-conscious community, let alone a nascent nation.

Geographer and historian Jack Keilo criticized Phoenicianist claims as anachronistic, noting that "Phoenicians" and "Phoenicia" only existed in the Greek context and under the Roman Empire.

Lebanese academic As'ad AbuKhalil writes that:

Phoenician achievements are exaggerated to the point that the Greek and Roman civilizations are perceived as inferior to the "Lebanese Phoenician civilization".

Abukhalil concludes that:

Phoenicianism has developed from an ideology into a full-fledged myth. [...] Even the discovery of America is attributed by Aql—among others in Lebanon—to Phoenician travelers who preceded Columbus. The great Greek thinkers are called Phoenicians. The school curricula in Lebanon reinforce the myths about the Phoenician people among all who accept a version of history promulgated by ideologues who have dominated the Ministry of Education since independence.

The Dutch university professor Leonard C. Biegel, in his 1972 book Minorities in the Middle East: Their significance as political factor in the Arab World, coined the term Neo-Shu'ubiyya to name the modern attempts of alternative non-Arab nationalisms in the Middle East, e.g. Aramaeanism, Assyrianism, Greater Syrian nationalism, Kurdish nationalism, Berberism, Pharaonism, Phoenicianism.

Historian Kamal Salibi, a Lebanese Protestant Christian, says, "between ancient Phoenicia and the Lebanon of medieval and modern times, there is no demonstrable historical connection."

The earliest sense of a modern Lebanese identity is to be found in the writings of historians in the early nineteenth century, when, under the emirate of the Shihabs, a Lebanese identity emerged "separate and distinct from the rest of Syria, bringing the Maronites and Druzes, along with its other Christian and Muslim sects, under one government". The first coherent history of Mount Lebanon was written by Tannus al-Shidyaq (died 1861) who depicted the country as a feudal association of Maronites, Druzes, Melkites, Sunnis and Shi'ites under the leadership of the Druze Ma'n dynasty and later the Sunni/Maronite Shihab emirs. "Most Christian Lebanese, anxious to dissociate themselves from Arabism and its Islamic connections, were pleased to be told that their country was the legitimate heir to the Phoenician tradition", Kamal Salibi observes, instancing Christian writers such as Charles Corm (died 1963), writing in French, and Said Aql, who urged the abandonment of Literary Arabic, together with its script, and attempted to write in the Lebanese vernacular, using the Roman alphabet.

Phoenician origins have additional appeal for the Christian middle class, as it presents the Phoenicians as traders, and the Lebanese emigrant as a modern-day Phoenician adventurer, whereas for the Muslim population it merely veiled French imperialist ambitions, intent on subverting pan-Arabism. Historian Fawwaz Traboulsi sees Phoenicianism as a tool which only served the economic and political interests of Maronite elites.

Many scholars and historians, including Kamal Salibi, Albert Hourani and Ameen Rihani, have criticized Phoenicianism for historical inaccuracies.

Historian Rola El-Husseini sees Phoenicianism as an origin myth; others note how it disregards the Arab cultural and linguistic influence on the Lebanese. They ascribe Phoenicianism to sectarian influences on Lebanese culture and the attempt by Lebanese Maronites to distance themselves from Arab culture and traditions.

As summed by As'ad AbuKhalil, Historical Dictionary of Lebanon (London: Scarecrow Press), 1998:

Ethnically speaking, the Lebanese are indistinguishable from the peoples of the eastern Mediterranean. They are undoubtedly a mixed population, reflecting centuries of population movement and foreign occupation... While Arabness is not an ethnicity but a cultural identity, some ardent Arab nationalists, in Lebanon and elsewhere, talk about Arabness in racial and ethnic terms to elevate the descendants of Muhammad. Paradoxically, Lebanese nationalists also speak about the Lebanese people in racial terms, claiming that the Lebanese are "pure" descendants of the Phoenician peoples, whom they view as separate from the ancient residents of the region, including — ironically — the Canaanites.

Recent studies by Miriam Balmuth has also shown that a large part of Phoenicians' history has been influenced by political ideologies that started with the Greeks and the Romans and that the Phoenicians did not have a shared Phoenician identity which they identified with, choosing to identify with their city of origins such as Tyre and Sidon. They did however share a common language, common religious practices, ethnic origin and a common maritime trade culture.

== See also ==
- Antiarabism
- Aramaeanism
- Assyrianism
- Berberism
- Canaanism
- Kataeb Party
- Lebanese nationalism
- Maronites
- May Murr
- Names of Syriac Christians
- Pan-Arabism
- Pharaonism
- Phoenicia
- Kurdish nationalism
- Said Akl
