= Lina Murr Nehmé =

French-Lebanese author and professor

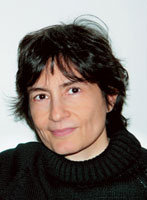
- Born: July 12, 1955 (age 70)
- Occupations: Author, Historian, University Professor
- Mother: May Murr

Lina Murr Nehmé (born 1955) is a French-Lebanese author and professor at the Lebanese University. She has authored various books in several languages on the civilisations of yesterday and today; particularly about modern religious extremism.

== Work and Positions ==
=== Religious Extremism ===
Over the course of several books (particularly "Fatwas et Caricatures"), Lina Murr Nehme analyzed the fatwas, sermons, and other materials being distributed by Islamic extremists. Using her knowledge of Arabic, she made key texts available to the non-specialist public. Her analyses cover topics such as how extremists justify attacks such as the Montauban shootings, describe the networks of Islamism in the West and their financing, and discuss the human rights records of those who finance extremist clerics, for example the case of Raif Badawi.

=== Defence of Cultural Heritage ===
In 2012, Lina Murr Nehmé took action to defend archeological sites in Beirut scheduled for destruction. After an initial phase of political lobbying, including meeting with the Minister of Culture, she organized a demonstration on 21 April 2012 centered on the situation of Plot 1474, which contains archaeological remains. In statements to the press, she asserted that the profits of private corporations should take second place to the preservation of cultural heritage.

=== Hostages ===
She has also taken stands on the issue of war hostages from the Lebanese War, noting that many families are still in uncertainty about the fate of a loved one. She demands that any hostage still alive be freed, and that information be released on those that are dead. She also took position publicly for the full investigation of a purported mass grave discovered in Chebaniyeh, Lebanon. This followed a 2008 mass graves scandal that started with the publication of an article by journalist Manal Chaaya revealing the location of a purported mass grave at Halate, Lebanon.

=== Right to Privacy ===
In 2011, she took a stand on the right to privacy, noting how significant quantities of data on Lebanese citizens were being collected by the government, and in some cases leaked to external parties.
