= May Murr =

Lebanese historian, writer, and political activist

- مي المر
- Born: 1929; Bteghrine, Greater Lebanon
- Died: 29 March 2008 (78 years old); Beirut, Lebanon
- Education: Lebanese Academy of Arts; University of Lyon
- Occupations: Historian, writer, poet, political activist.
- Spouse: Alfred Murr
- Children: 5 (including Lina Murr Nehmé)
- Relatives: Michel Murr (brother); Gabriel Murr (brother)
- Writing career
- Language: Arabic; French
- Years active: 1967–2008
- Genres: Poetry, History, Historical Novel
- Notable works: Elissa; Pourqoi les Roses?
- Notable awards: Said Akl Award (1970)

May Murr, sometimes written as Mayy Murr (Arabic: مي المر; 1929 – 29 March 2008) was a Lebanese professor, historian, writer, poet, and political activist. Murr's poetry was influenced by her academic interests in geography and history, blending her literary and scholarly pursuits. Her works frequently emphasized Lebanon's role as a cradle of human civilization and religious significance, attributing the invention of the alphabet and several biblical events to Lebanese origins, and also touched on themes of spiritual love. She wrote in French, classical Arabic, and "Phoenician-Lebanese," maintaining consistent themes across languages while expressing her nationalistic sentiments.

== Biography ==
The elder sister of Lebanese member of parliament Michel Murr, Murr was born in 1929 to a Greek Orthodox Christian family in the Matn District village of Bteghrine. She studied history and geography and has a diploma in both from the Lebanese Academy of Fine Arts, and in 1973 she obtained her degree in geography from the University of Lyon, France.

Before taking up writing, May Murr taught several subjects at several universities and institutions in Lebanon such as the Lebanese University and the Lebanese Army Military Academy, in which she taught mathematics, literature, history, history of art and geography. Her husband was engineer, Alfred Murr. The couple were active members of the Phoenician-Lebanese movement.

She began professionally writing and publishing her works in 1967, as well as founding and presiding over many cultural and social associations. She was a member of the Société des Gens de Lettres de France and of the Société Teilhard de Chardin, headquartered in Belgium, the Academy of American Poets, and a Distinguished Member of the New York-based International Society of Poets. She was also the President of the Academy of Lebanese Thought and was a founding member of the ultranationalist political party the Guardians of the Cedars.

She figures among the women poets in the Anthologie de la Poésie Féminine Mondiale. Many international critics have praised her poetry. Jean Cayrol wrote to her: 'May Murr, you are filled with poetry to infinity', while Lebanese poet Said Akl wrote, in 1967, an article entitled 'A woman invades the conscience of Lebanon':

May Murr in 'Elissa', a Lebanese Shakespeare, has imposed herself as the creator of the Lebanese drama and a giant among giants... Whole volumes can be written about May Murr's art... May Murr is one of the authors who can create something new with the strangeness of a unique treatment; and in the domain of beauty, she creates wonders.

== Publications ==
May Murr has written more than 3,000 articles on several subjects (theology, philosophy, politics, literature, arts, history, geography, social problems...) with an emphasis on the problems of the family, womanhood and childhood, in most of the major Lebanese newspapers and magazines, in three languages: Lebanese Arabic, French and Standard Arabic.

She was the editor-in-chief of the weekly Lebnan since its creation in 1975 until 1982. She published in this weekly political articles, poems and extracts from Lubnaniyada, her epic poem in Lebanese Arabic (of some 30,000 verses) and historical essays which allowed her to call the history of Lebanon-Phoenicia the Giant of Histories, and to entitle her works on the history of Lebanon in 12 volumes (still manuscript) Lebanon-Phoenicia, Land of God.

=== In Lebanese Arabic ===
- Elissa: a historical drama in verse, considered as a summit in this field. Beirut, 1968.
- I love You: Love poems (in neo-Lebanese characters) Editions St Paul, 1978.
- Various publications in prose and poetry in the press.

=== In French ===
- Pourquoi les Roses? Love poems (in both classical and free verses), Paris, Grassin, 1967.
- Penchent Leur Tête les Epis: Poems (in both classical and free verses), Paris, Grassin, 1969. Paris, Grassin, 1967.
- Il S'agit d'un Rien d'Amour: Prayers (in free verse), Paris, Grassin, 1970.
- Quatrains: Poems (in classical verse), Paris, Grassin — Jounieh, St Paul, 1971.
- Kamal or the Story of a Hero: Poetry and prose, with a prayer in verse as an introduction. Beirut, Ishtar, 1987.
- Poésie Trismégiste: Spiritual Poems (in classical verse), Etablissements Khalifé pour l'Impression, Beirut, 1994.

=== In Standard Arabic ===
- The Most Beautiful Tales of Lebanon-Phoenicia. Beirut.
- The Magic Birdie.
- The Time Vessel.
- Lebanon and Phoenicia.
- Thor and Maya.
- The Emerald Temple.
- I Shall Give Your Name to Tyre.
- The One Who Restored the Empire of the World to the Phoenicians.
- Tripoli, I prefer you to myself.
- He Meant Us for Love.
- Elissa, Founder of the Queen of Our Emporia's.
- Sidon Returns from Death.
- Euclid of Tyre, Organizer of the Mind.

May Murr has also published in the press three collections of Arabic classical poems:

- My God, I love You.
- Lebanon also I love.
- A Kiss for You.

=== Unpublished works ===
Many manuscripts written in collaboration with her husband, Alfred Murr (deceased 2005), await publication:

- Jesus. An epic poem in Lebanese Arabic of some 15,000 verses.
- The First Love Letter, or Thor and Maya. A historical novel
- Cadmus of Tyre. The Universal Master. A historical novel.
- He Meant Us for Love, or Adoniram, Solomon and the Queen of Sheba. A historical novel.
- Euclid of Tyre, Organizer of the Mind. A historical novel in Arabic.
- Several novels, plays (including Marina), and nine books of poetry.

== Recognition ==
- Gens de lettres de France (1968),
- Prix de la Rose des poètes, Paris (1969)
- The Said Akl prize (1970)
- The Fakhr al-Din Prize, awarded by General Aziz Ahdab for her contributions to the study of Lebanese history (1974)
- Grand Prix Europa (1999)

== See also ==
- Phoenicianism
- Guardians of the Cedars
- Lebanese Arabic
- Said Akl
