= Sami Shawa =

Syrian violinist (1887–1960)

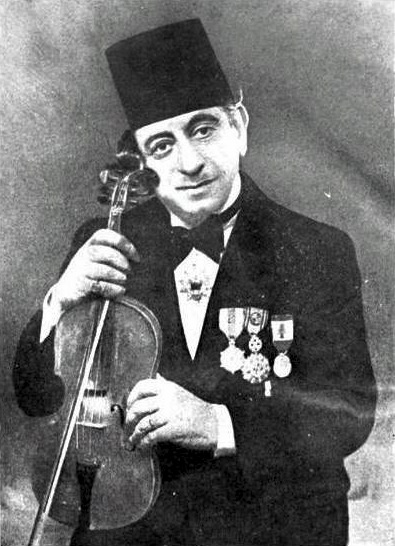
Image of Sami Al-Shawwa

Sami Shawa or Sami Al-Shawwa (Arabic: سامي الشوا; 1887–1960) was a Syrian violinist. After creating a music school in Cairo in 1906, he became famous both for his solo performances and for having accompanied the great singers of the time, including Oum Kalsoum.

He mastered almost all the musical styles, and modes of the Arab world at the time. Described as a virtuoso by the CNRS , his first recording dates back to the 1920s. Re-released in 2009 by Columbia he is mainly known today thanks to a 2003 re-release under the title Master of the Arabic Violin. There is another recording released in 1932, Prince of the Arab Violin, re-released in 1967 and categorized as a rock album.
