= Lebanese Maronite Christians =

Religious group in Lebanon associated with the Catholic Church

Lebanese Maronite Christians المسيحيين الموارنة اللبنانيين
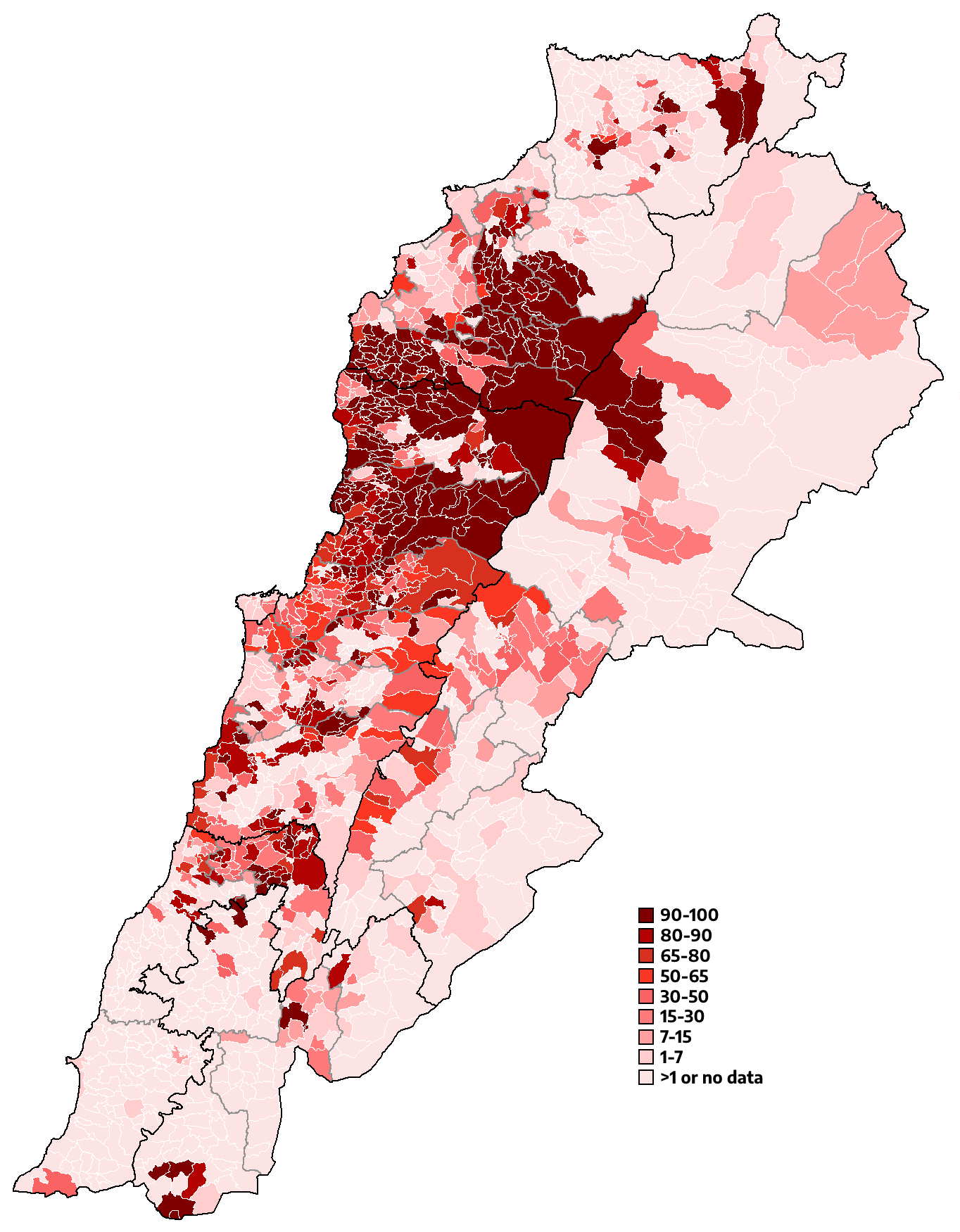
- Distribution of Maronite Catholic Christians in Lebanon

Total population
- 800,000–1,400,000

Languages
- Vernacular: Lebanese Arabic, Neo-Aramaic (Language revitalization); historically Lebanese Aramaic; Liturgical: Classical Syriac

Religion
- Christianity (Maronite Catholic)

Lebanese Maronite Christians (Arabic: المسيحية المارونية في لبنان; Classical Syriac: ܡܫܝܚܝ̈ܐ ܡܪ̈ܘܢܝܐ ܕܠܒܢܢ) refers to Lebanese people who are members of the Maronite Catholic Church in Lebanon, the largest Christian body in the country. The Lebanese Maronite population is concentrated mainly in Mount Lebanon and East Beirut. They are believed to constitute about 22% of the total population of Lebanon.

The Maronites and the Druze founded modern Lebanon in the early eighteenth century through the ruling and social system known as the "Maronite–Druze dualism." The 1860 Druze–Maronite conflict led to the establishment of Mount Lebanon Mutasarrifate, an autonomous entity within the Ottoman Empire dominated by Maronites and protected by European powers. In the aftermath of the First World War, the Maronites successfully campaigned for Greater Lebanon carved out from Mount Lebanon and neighboring areas. Under the French Mandate, and until the end of the Second World War, the Maronites gained substantial influence. Post-independence, they dominated Lebanese politics until the 1975–1990 civil war, which ended their supremacy. While the Taif Accords weakened Maronite influence, it endures alongside other dominant Lebanese communities, such as the Shiites and Sunnis.

Lebanon's constitution was intended to guarantee political representation for each of the nation's religious groups. Under the terms of an unwritten agreement known as the National Pact between the various political and religious leaders of Lebanon, the president of the country must be a Maronite.

== History ==
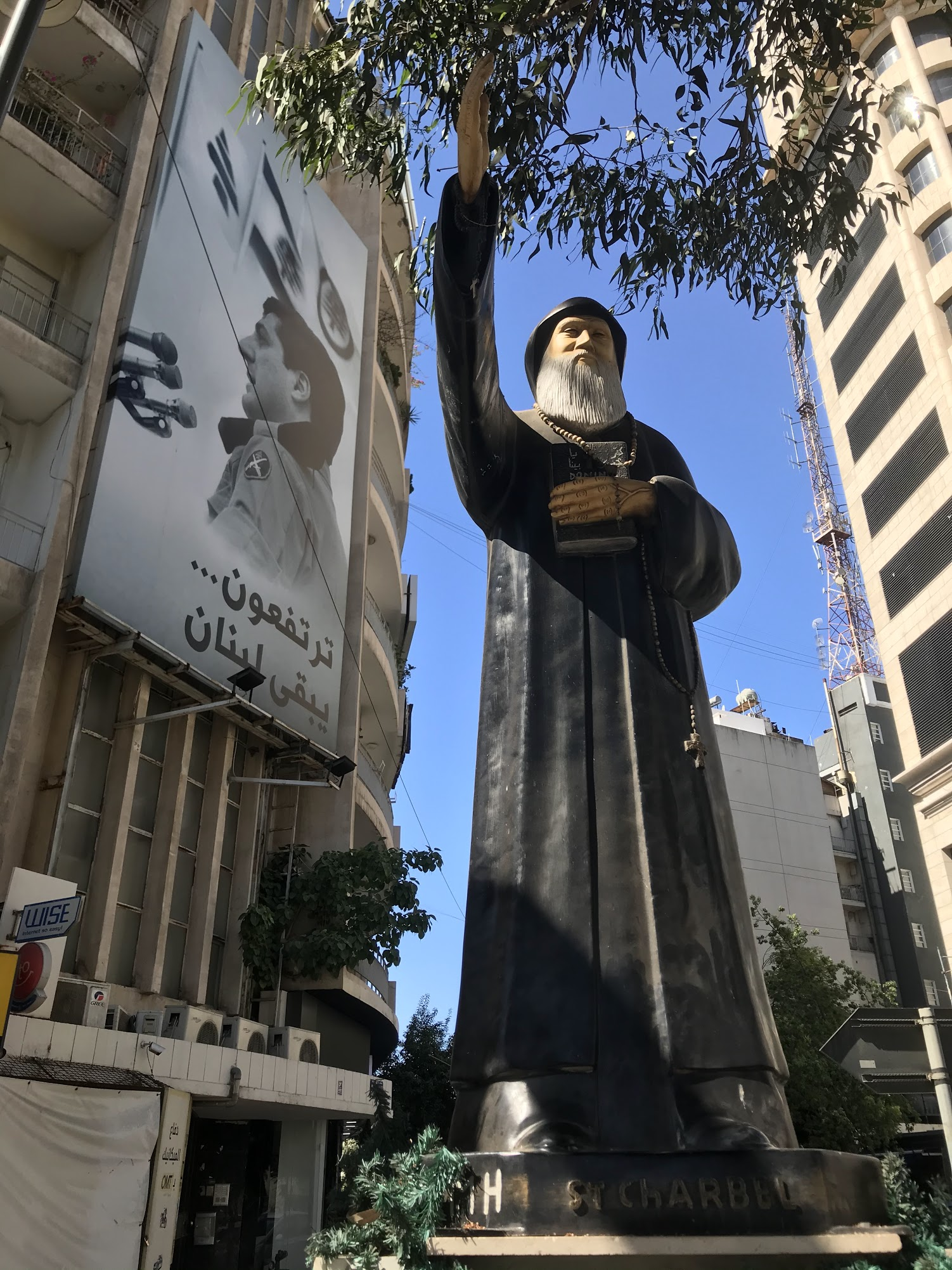
Two important Maronite Christian symbols on Sassine Square, Achrafieh: a statue of Saint Charbel, the most important Maronite saint; and a billboard on a side of a building showing Bachir Gemayel, the Maronite militia leader during the Lebanese Civil War

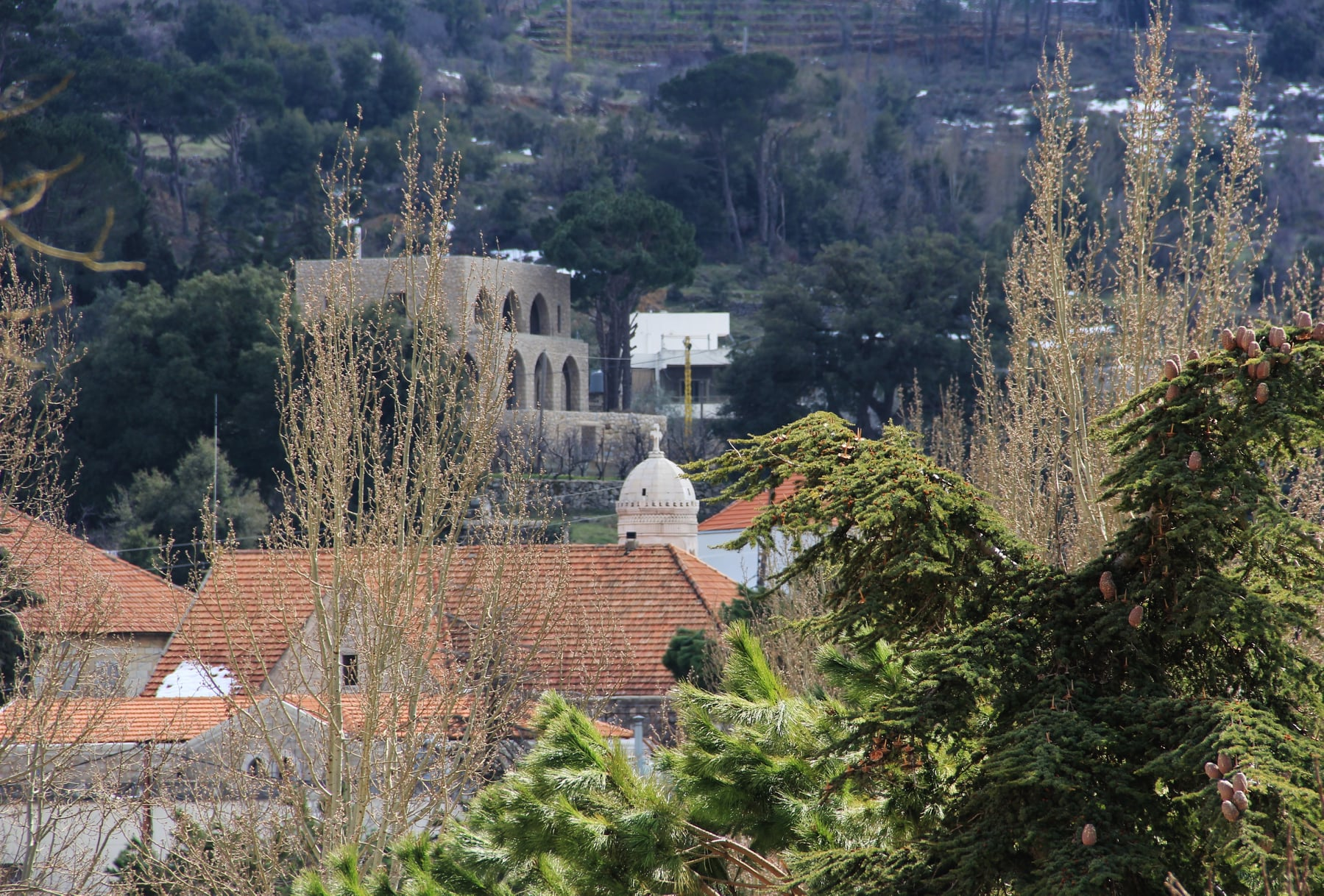
A Christian church and Druze khalwa in Chouf Mountains: In the early 18th century the Maronites and the Druze set the foundation for what is now Lebanon.

The cultural and linguistic heritage of the Lebanese people is a blend of both indigenous Phoenician elements and the foreign cultures that have come to rule the land and its people over the course of thousands of years. In a 2013 interview the lead investigator of the National Geographic Society's Genographic Project, Pierre Zalloua, pointed out that genetic variation preceded religious variation and divisions: "Lebanon already had well-differentiated communities with their own genetic peculiarities, but not significant differences, and religions came as layers of paint on top. There is no distinct pattern that shows that one community carries significantly more Phoenician than another."

The Maronite population in Lebanon has a rich history. Its foundation can be traced to early followers of Maron, who migrated from the region of Antioch to Mount Lebanon. Historically, Lebanese Maronites resided in remote mountain villages and were led by influential noble families.

The followers of Jesus Christ first became known as "Christians" in the ancient Greek city of Antioch (Acts 11:26), and the city became a center for Christianity – especially after the destruction of Jerusalem in AD 70. According to Roman Catholic tradition, the first Bishop was Saint Peter before his travels to Rome. The third Bishop was the Apostolic Father Ignatius of Antioch. Antioch became one of the five original Patriarchates (the Pentarchy) after Roman Emperor Constantine recognized Christianity.

The Maronite Christianity derived its name and religious identity from Saint Maron whose followers migrated to the area of Mount Lebanon (present day Republic of Lebanon) from their previous location of residence around the area of Antioch (an ancient Greek city within present day Hatay Province, Turkey), establishing the nucleus of the Maronite Church.

More specifically, Maron, a fourth-century monk and the contemporary and friend of St. John Chrysostom, left Antioch for the Orontes River to lead an ascetic life, following the traditions of Anthony the Great of the Desert and Pachomius. Many of his followers also lived a monastic lifestyle. Following the death of Maron in 410, his disciples built a monastery in his memory and formed the nucleus of the Maronite Church.

The Maronites held fast to the beliefs of the Council of Chalcedon in 451. When the Monophysites of Antioch slew 350 monks, the Maronites sought refuge in the mountains of Lebanon. Correspondence concerning the event brought the Maronites papal and orthodox recognition, which was solidified by Pope Hormisdas (514–523) on 10 February 518. A monastery was built around the shrine of St. Maron (Marun) after the Council of Chalcedon.

The martyrdom of the Patriarch of Antioch in the first decade of the seventh century, either at the hands of Persian soldiers or local Jews, left the Maronites without a leader, a situation which continued because of the final and most devastating Byzantine–Sassanid War of 602–628. In the aftermath of the war, the Roman Emperor Heraclius propagated a new Christological doctrine in an attempt to unify the various Christian churches of the east, who were divided over accepting the Council of Chalcedon. This doctrine, monothelitism, was meant as a compromise between supporters of Chalcedon, such as the Maronites, and opponents, such as the Jacobites. To win back the Monophysites, Monoenergism was first advocated by Patriarch Sergius I of Constantinople. Pope Honorius I (625–638) of Rome naively called for an end to dispute and interpreted Sergius' view as true since Christ exhibited only one will insofar as His sinless human nature will never disagree with His divine will.

Instead, the Patriarch of Constantinople's doctrine and subsequent Monothelitism caused greater controversy and was declared a heresy at the Sixth Ecumenical Council in 680–681. Contemporary Greek, Latin and Arab sources indicate that the Maronites accepted monothelitism, rejected the sixth council, and continued to maintain a belief in the largely discredited monothelite doctrine for centuries, only moving away from monothelitism in the time of the crusades in order to avoid being branded heretics by the crusaders. The modern Maronite Church, however, rejects the assertion that the Maronites were ever monothelites separated from the rest of the universal Church. The question remains a cause of significant offence to this day.

In 687, the Roman Emperor Justinian II agreed to evacuate many thousand Maronites from Lebanon and settle them elsewhere. The chaos and utter depression which followed led the Maronites to elect their first Patriarch, John Maroun, that year. This, however, was seen as a usurpation by the then undivided Orthodox Catholic church. Thus, at a time when Islam was rising on the borders of the Byzantine Empire and a united front was necessary to keep out Islamic infiltration, the Maronites were focused on a struggle to retain their independence against imperial power. This situation was mirrored in other Christian communities in the Byzantine Empire and helped facilitate the Muslim conquest of most of Eastern Christendom by the end of the century.

In 1858, there was a popular movement dubbed the "Kisrawan Uprising", aimed at reform of social order in a predominantly Maronite district, among Maronite Christians. This uprising was spurred by the Tanzimat, wealth and material inequality and a unfair division of land between the notables and "common" people.

The relationship between the Druze and Christians has been characterized by harmony and peaceful coexistence, with amicable relations between the two groups prevailing throughout history, with the exception of some periods, including 1860 Mount Lebanon civil war. The Maronite Catholics and the Druze founded modern Lebanon in the early eighteenth century, through a governing and social system known as the "Maronite-Druze dualism" in the Mount Lebanon Mutasarrifate.

== Religion ==
The Maronites belong to the Maronite Syriac Church of Antioch in Hatay Province, Turkey), an Eastern Catholic Syriac Church that has affirmed its communion with Rome since 1180. The official view of the Church is that it had never accepted either the Monophysitic views held by their Syriac neighbours, which were condemned in the Council of Chalcedon, or the failed compromise doctrine of Monothelitism (the latter claim being found in contemporary sources). The Maronite Patriarch is traditionally seated in Bkerke, north of Beirut.

== Geographic distribution within Lebanon ==
Lebanese Maronite Christians are concentrated in the north of Beirut, northern part of Mount Lebanon Governorate, southern part of North Governorate, parts of Beqaa Governorate and South Governorate.

Maronite division among main Syriac Christian groups

== Demographics ==
Lebanese Maronites
Year	Percent
1932	35%
1985	46%
1994	31%
2012	24%

The last Census in Lebanon in 1932 put the numbers of Maronites at 29%. A study done by the Central Intelligence Agency (CIA) in 1985 put the numbers of Maronites at 16% of the population. Given that the last census was in 1932, percentages are estimates only since it is difficult to have precise population estimates.

In 2012, Maronites constituted 31% of Lebanon's population, according to estimates. The Maronite Church's website claims 1,062,000 members were in Lebanon in 1994 which would have made them around 31% of Lebanon's population. Maronite Catholics are the largest Christian group, followed by Greek Orthodox.

In 2014, according to electoral data, Maronites made up 19.97% of registered voters aged 21 and above. In 2022, based on the registered voters aged 21+ for the elections, Druze represented 19.94% of the global Lebanese population. The overall proportions remained stable between 2014 and 2022, with a slight decrease in this group.

Year
Year	Maronites
2014	19.97%
2022	19.94%

Year	Maronites
2014	701 920
2022	797 174
Growth	+95 254
% growth	▲11.95%

Note that the following percentages are estimates only. As the last Lebanese census was conducted in 1932, it is difficult to have precise population estimates.

Repartition of Lebanese Maronites by governorates
Governorates of Lebanon	2014		2022	
Governorates of Lebanon	Pop.	%	Pop.	%
Mount Lebanon Governorate	212 997	32.88%	236 908	33.28%
North Governorate	170 514	30.34%	186 987	29.34%
Keserwan-Jbeil Governorate	128 802	75.7%	139 804	76.37%
South Governorate	47 869	12.14%	55 768	12.02%
Beqaa Governorate	38 321	12.74%	45 040	13.1%
Akkar Governorate	29 537	11.47%	33 271	11.01%
Beirut Governorate	28 534	6.11%	40 275	7.62%
Nabatieh Governorate	23 355	5.52%	31 440	6.39%
Baalbek-Hermel Governorate	21 991	7.53%	27 671	8.32%
Total Lebanese Maronite population	701 920	19.97%	797 174	19.93%

Distribution of Lebanese Maronites by governorates
Governorates of Lebanon	2014		2022	
Governorates of Lebanon	Pop.	%	Pop.	%
Mount Lebanon Governorate	212 997	30.34%	236 908	29.72%
North Governorate	170 514	24.29%	186 987	23.46%
Keserwan-Jbeil Governorate	128 802	18.35%	139 804	17.54%
South Governorate	47 869	6.82%	55 768	7%
Beqaa Governorate	38 321	5.46%	45 040	5.65%
Akkar Governorate	29 537	4.21%	33 271	4.17%
Beirut Governorate	28 534	4.07%	40 275	5.05%
Nabatieh Governorate	23 355	3.33%	31 440	3.94%
Baalbek-Hermel Governorate	21 991	3.13%	27 671	3.47%
Total Lebanese Maronite population	701 920	100%	797 174	100%

Percentage growth of the Lebanese Maronite Christians (other sources estimated)
Year	Maronite Population	Total Lebanese Population	Percentage
1861	208,180	487,600	42.7%
1921	199,181	609,069	32.7%
1932	226,378	785,543	28.8%
1956	423,708	1,407,858	30.1%
1975	586,500	2,550,000	23%
1988	999,672	4,044,784	24.7%

== Lebanese Maronite-born notable people ==
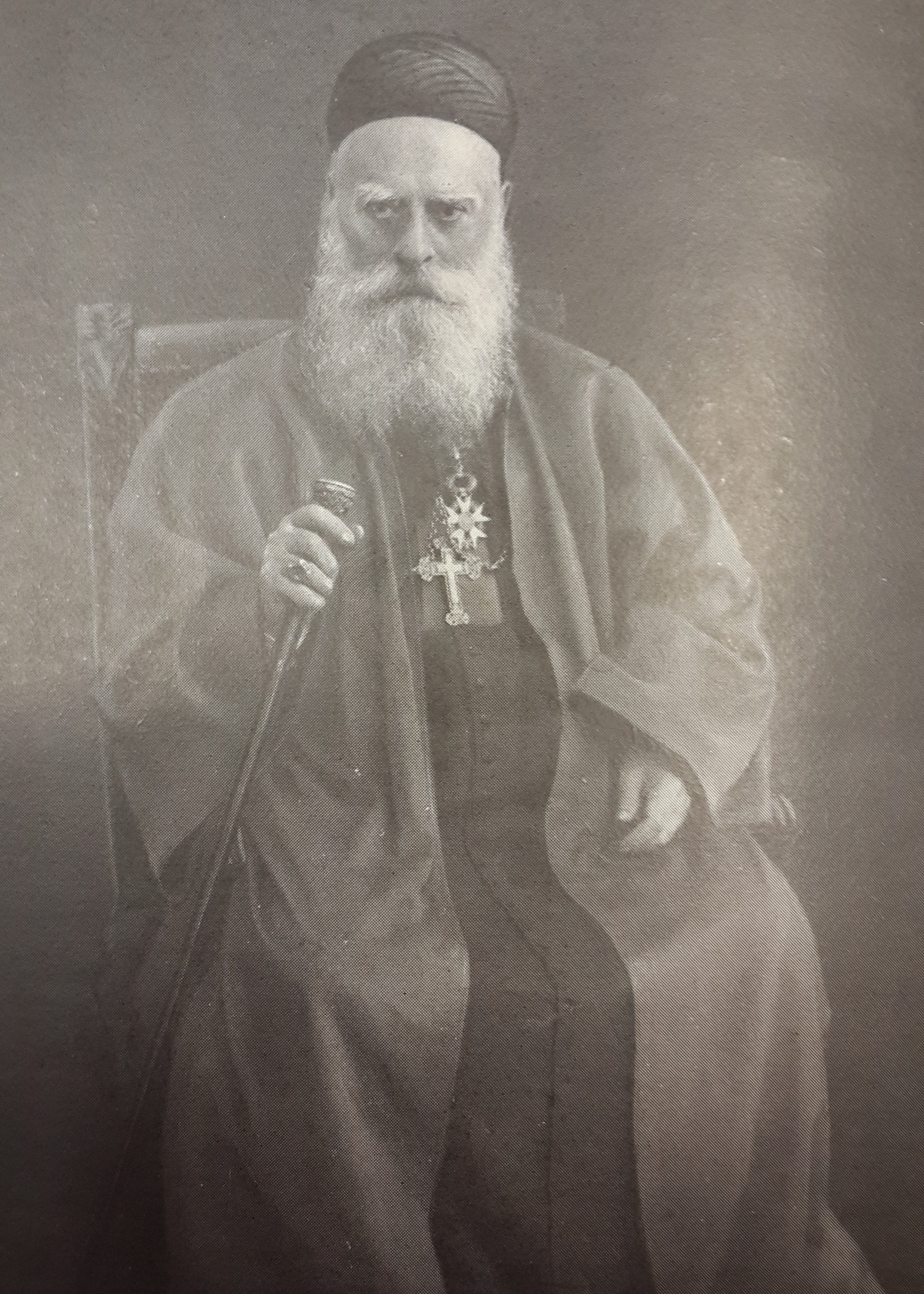
Elias Peter Hoayek

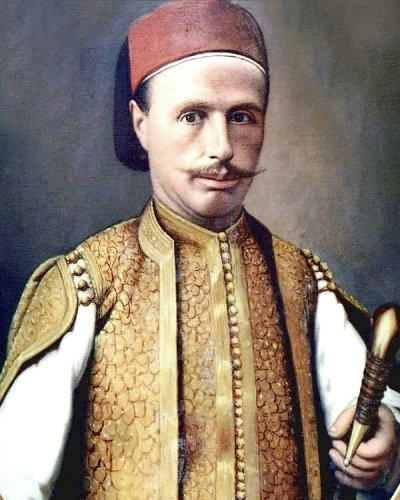
Youssef Bey Karam

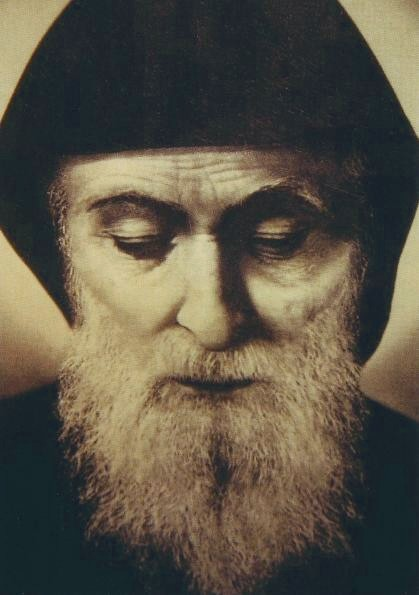
Charbel Makhluf

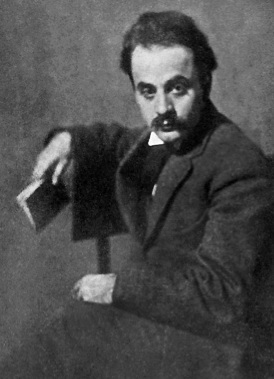
Khalil Gibran

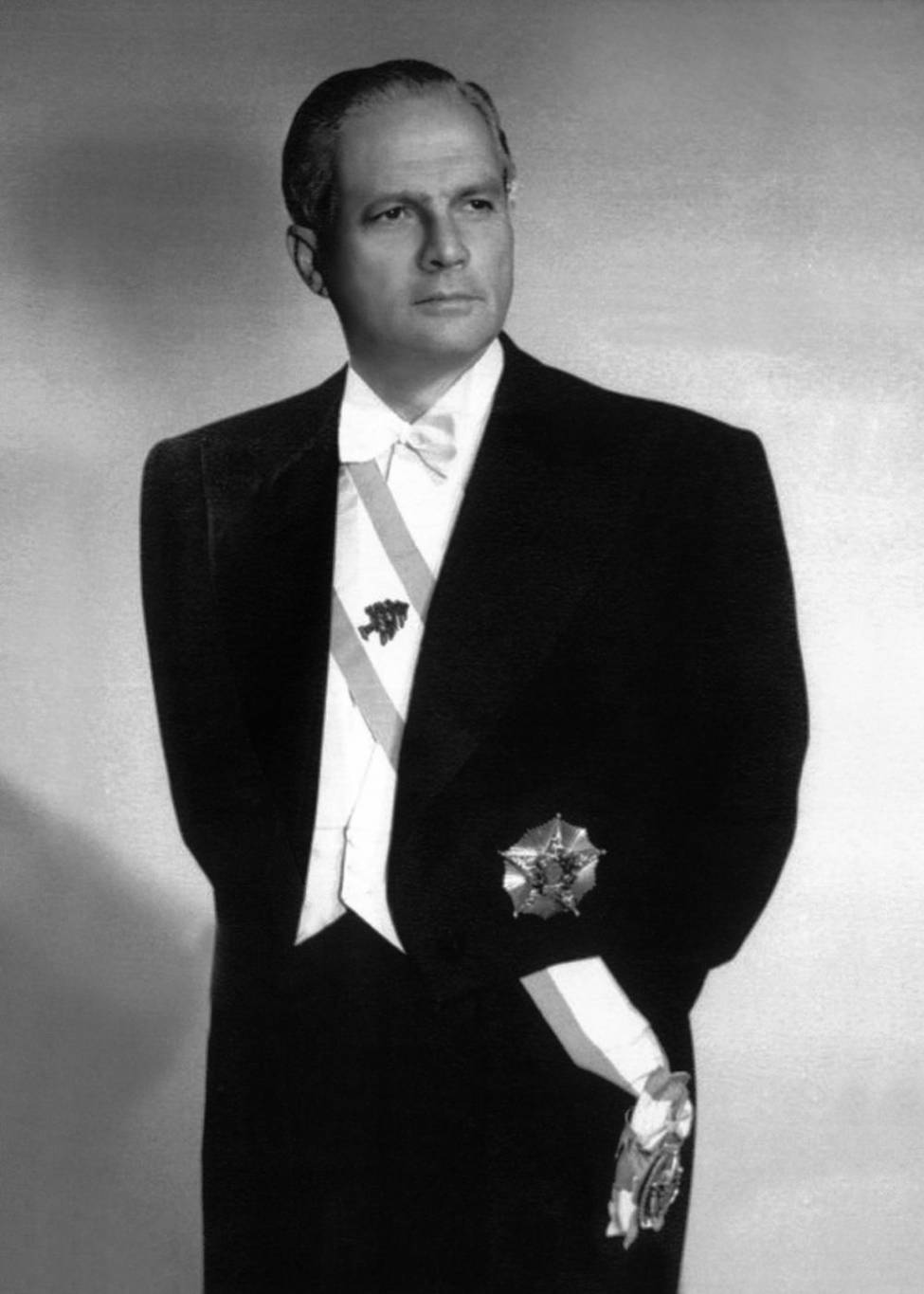
Camille Chamoun

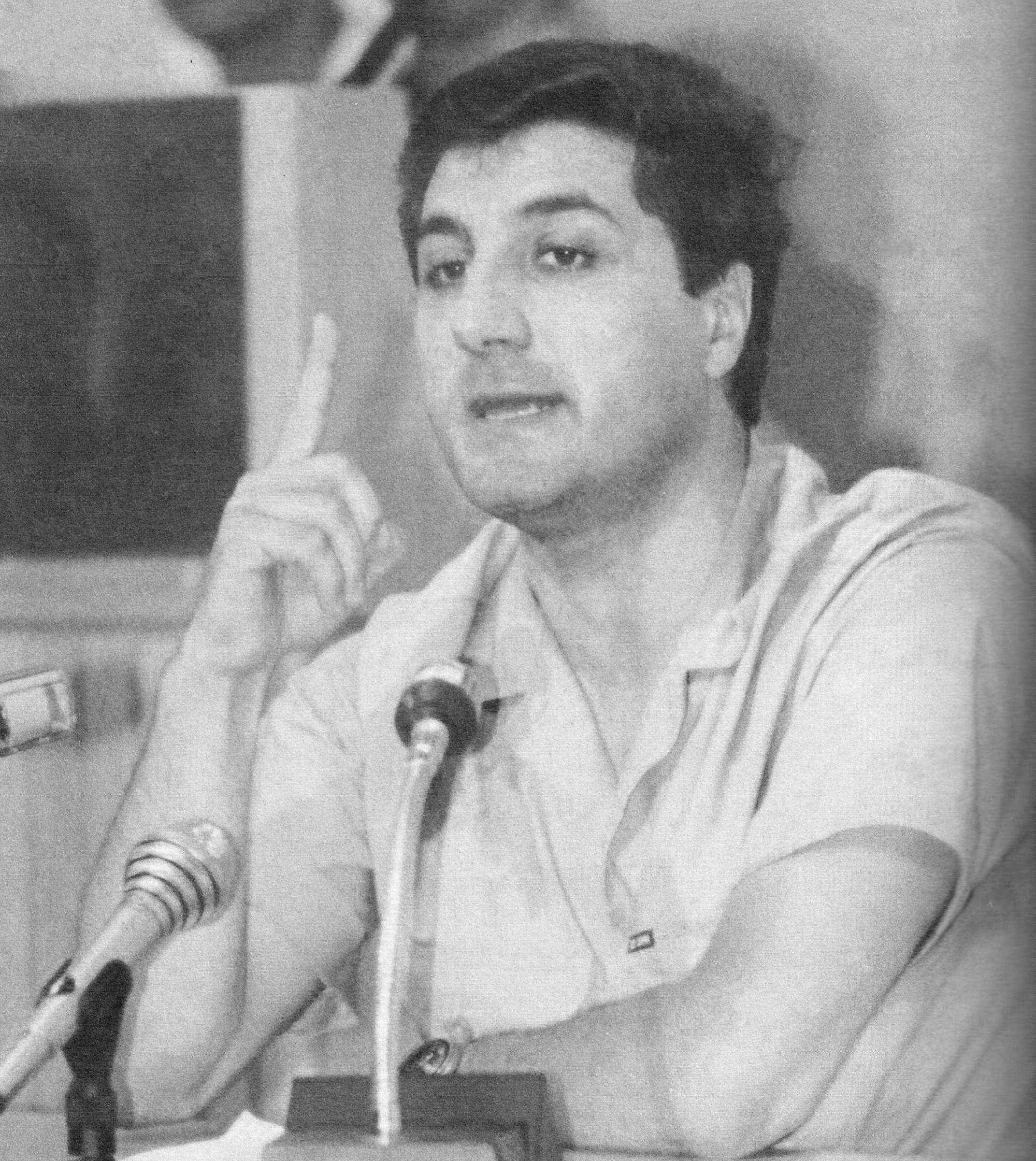
Bachir Gemayel

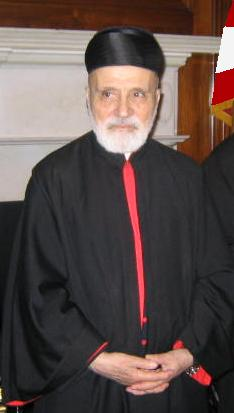
Nasrallah Boutros Sfeir

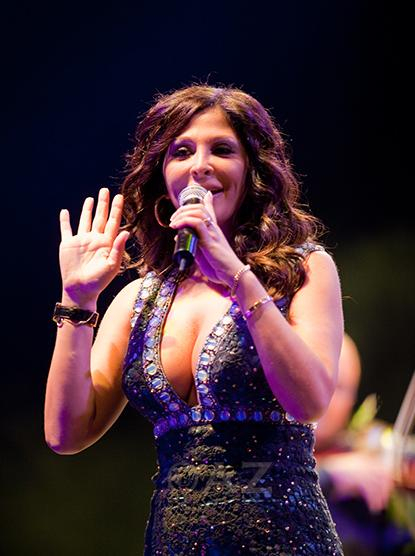
Elissa

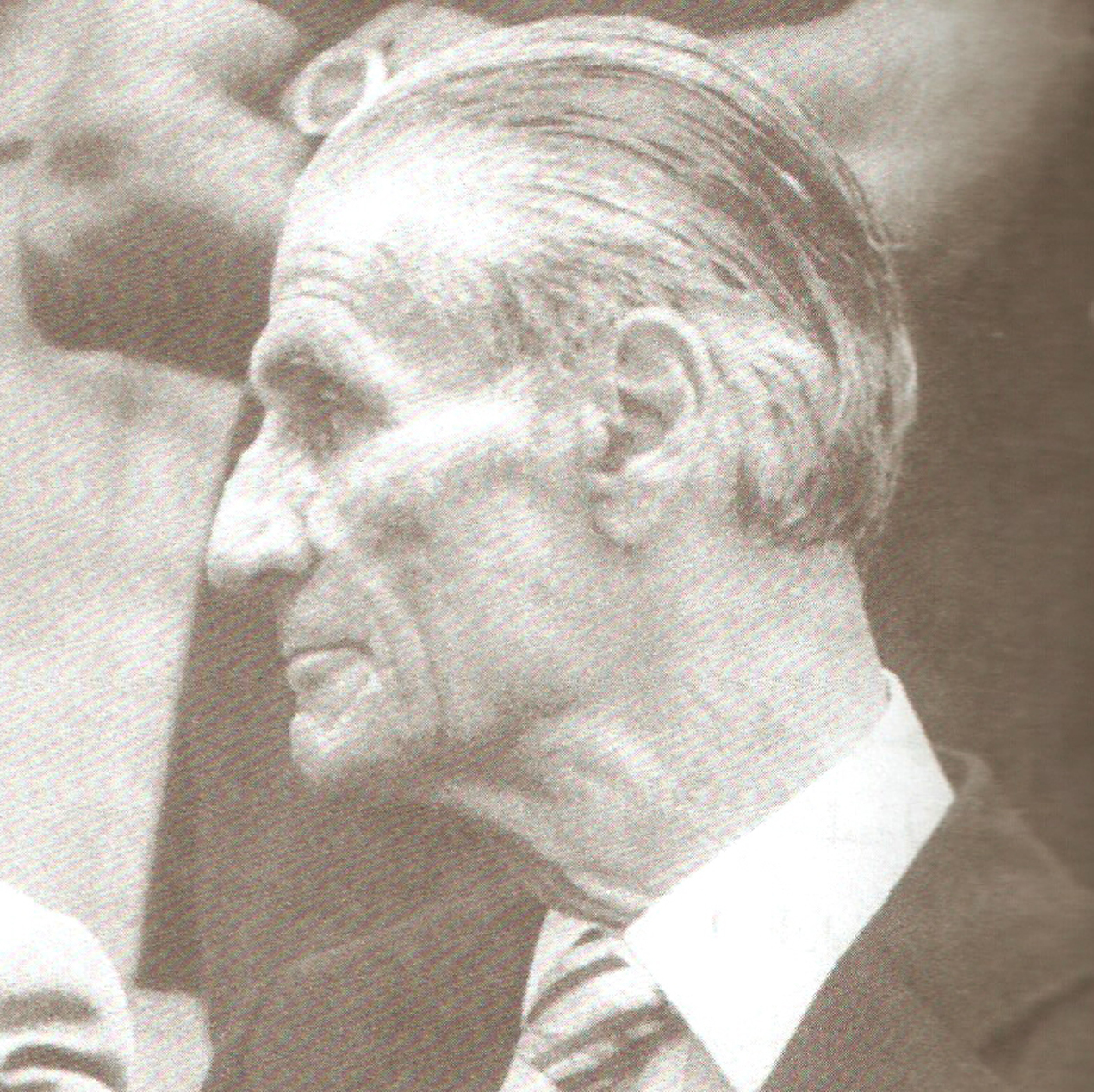
Pierre Gemayel

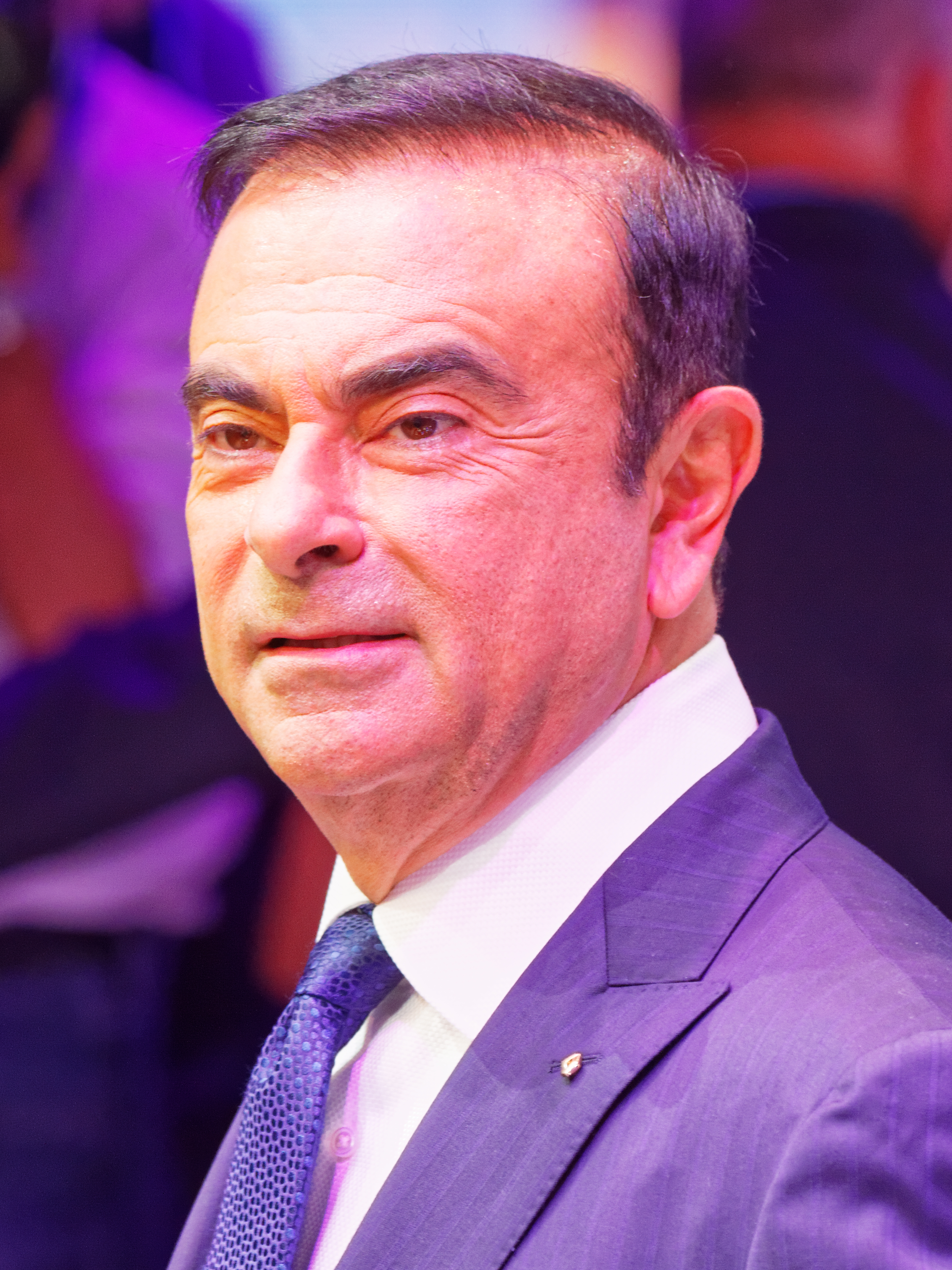
Carlos Ghosn

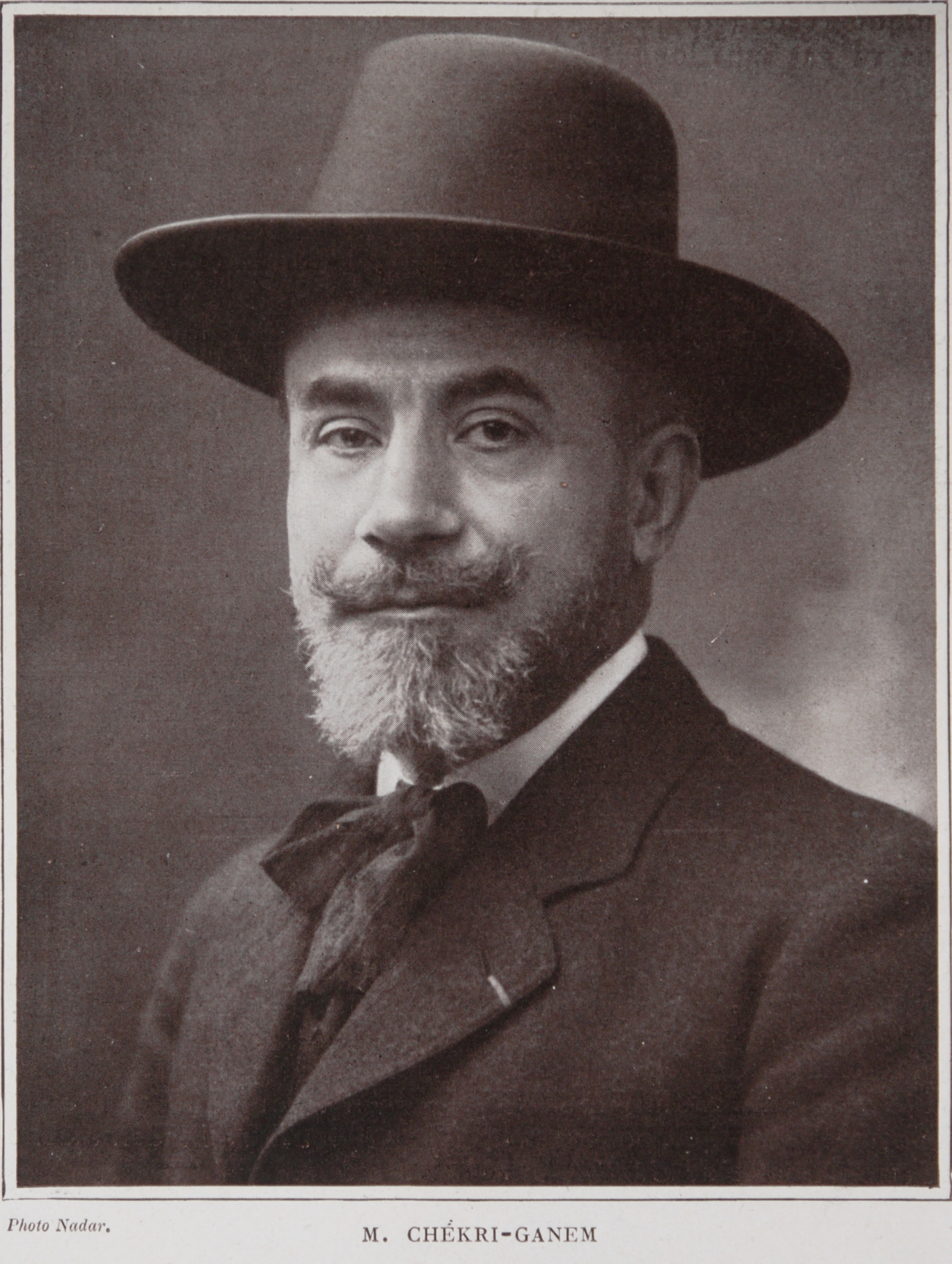
Chekri Ganem

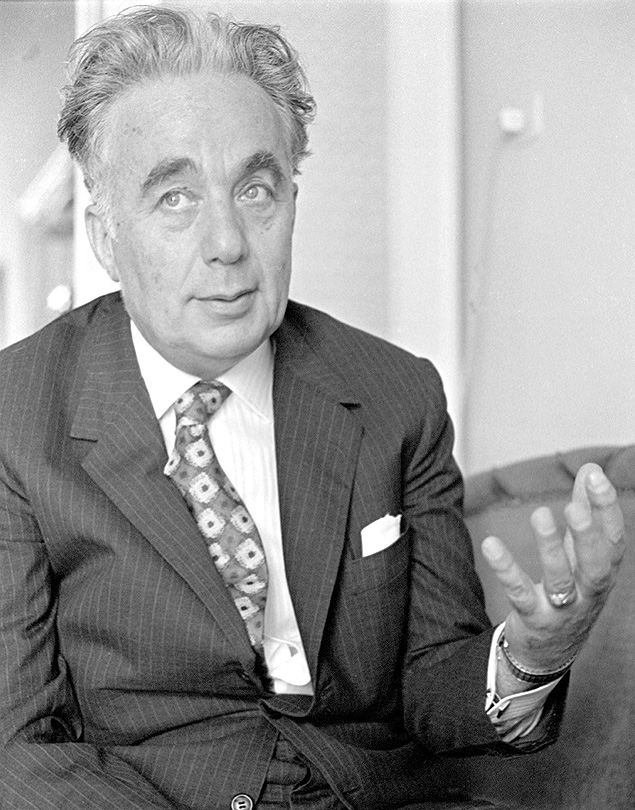
Said Akl

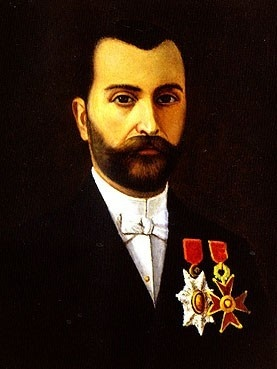
Daoud Corm

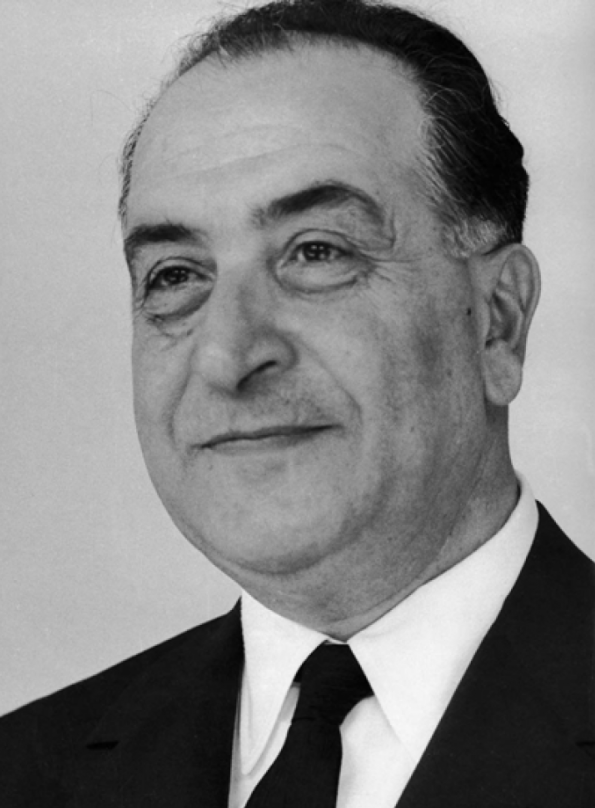
Fouad Chehab

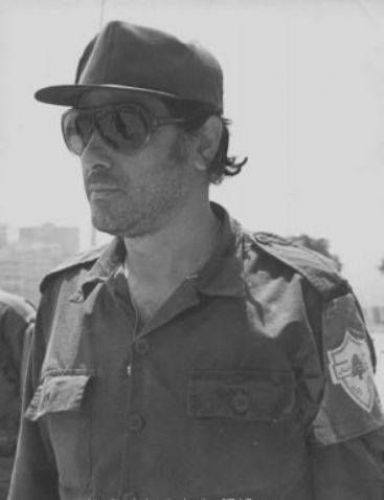
Etienne Saqr

- Joseph Aoun, President of Lebanon (since 2025) and Lebanese Commander
- Michel Aoun, President of Lebanon (2016–2022)
- Julia Boutros, singer
- Camille Chamoun, President of Lebanon (1952–1958)
- Fuad Chehab, President of Lebanon (1958–1964)
- Adam Doueihi, rugby league player
- Charles Helou, President of Lebanon (1964–1970)
- Émile Eddé, President of Lebanon (1943)
- Christophe Zakhia El-Kassis, Maronite archbishop and Vatican Ambassador to Pakistan
- Bechara El Khoury, President of Lebanon (1943–1952)
- Habib Pacha Es-Saad, President of Lebanon (1934-1936)
- Suleiman Frangieh, President of Lebanon (1970–1976)
- Elias Sarkis, President of Lebanon (1976–1982)
- Samir Geagea, President of the Lebanese Forces
- Bachir Gemayel, President of Lebanon (1982)
- Amine Gemayel, President of Lebanon (1982–1988)
- Pierre Gemayel, Founder of the Lebanese Kataeb
- Khalil Gibran, writer and poet
- Elias Hrawi, President of Lebanon (1989–1998)
- Jocelyne Khoueiry, militant
- Jacob Kiraz, rugby league player
- Antoine Lahad (1927–2015), Lebanese Army Major General, and subsequently leader of the South Lebanon Army
- Émile Lahoud, President of Lebanon (1998–2007)
- Alfred Naqqache, President of Lebanon (1941–1943)
- Michel Suleiman, President of Lebanon (2008–2014)

== See also ==
- Religion in Lebanon
- Christianity in Lebanon
- Catholic Church in Lebanon
- Maronite Church
- Maronite politics
- East Beirut canton
- Lebanese Melkite Christians
- Lebanese Protestant Christians
- Lebanese Greek Orthodox Christians
- Lebanese Shia Muslims
- Lebanese Sunni Muslims
- Lebanese Druze
