= Akl Awit =

Lebanese writer and academic

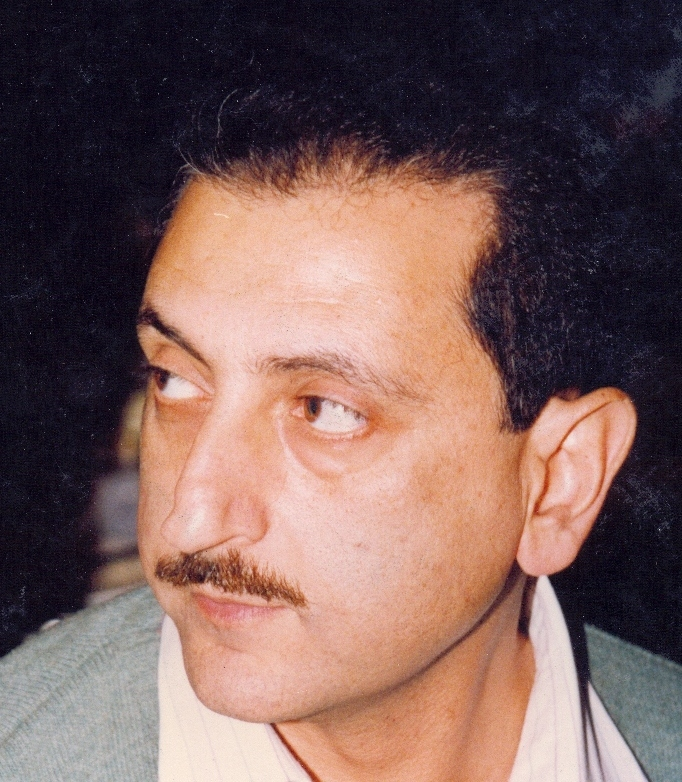

Akl Awit (Arabic: عقل العويط born 1952, Bziza) is a Lebanese poet, critic, literary journalist and academic professor holding a Ph.D. degree in modern Arabic literature. Awit's work, including individual poetry books and anthologies, has been published not only locally, but also translated and distributed internationally.

== Biography ==
=== Early life ===
Akl Awit grew up in Bziza, a village in the North of Lebanon. Awit's love for literature was innate and grew even more because of the environment he lived in; a family that lives in a house surrounded by books and a grandfather who himself was an orator. They would go from their house in the mountains to a village in the coast named chekka for the main purpose of studying and reading. His family rented books from a shop called "Abou Georges" and all including his siblings, took turns in reading them. Awit started writing short poems about his dreams and frustrations ever since he was in high school, but were all drafts. He aspired to become better than the best and looked up to many poets including Fouad Sleiman, Gebran Khalil Gebran and Ounsi el-hajj. His passion for writing grew more and more. He was also inspired by French poems and French culture which helped him translate his ideas and write down his works.

=== Personal life ===
Akl never followed nor tended to a specific political party, on the contrary, he was part of a group called "Awareness" (in Arabic " الوعي") back in university that opposed all existing parties at the time. In a sense, he believed in being free. To this day, Akl Awit is still against all political parties and believes that they are the reason why Lebanon is getting destroyed, he even showcased his anger about this topic throughout his articles in "Jaridat Al Nahar".

At some point in his life, Akl fell in love with, also poet and writer, Joumana Haddad. They got married and had a son "Ounsi" named after the Lebanese poet Ounsi el-hajj, however, later on went their separate ways.

At the present time, Akl looks back to marriage and regards it as "useless".

Other than writing, Awit enjoys listening to music with a particular love for jazz and classical music. His favorite artists include Beethoven and Feyrouz. Moreover, Awit loves drawing and sculpting. He enjoys any activity that requires his artistic assistance. Akl Awit's house is made up of at least one hundred distinct paintings, and he views it as his own museum. Also, Awit loves spending time in his garden when he is at his mountain house during the weekends with his dog Cooper.

== Career ==
Akl Awit later on found himself sharing one of his writings for the first time in a poetry competition at university. It was then that he acknowledged his great love for the Arabic Language and his character began to stand out.

His first five published books were all handwritten initially, however, around 1987, Akl eventually had to shift to typing his writings onto a computer; especially since he was working as a journalist in France. Nevertheless, the process of composing his poems, he explains (A. Awit, personal communication, November 7, 2020), is a lengthy one. His first writing is never his last writing. When a sudden event occurs, Awit does not rest until he finishes his writing of it. Sometimes, this process takes days he explains, but he tries to finish the work with no interrupted thoughts.

As his career flourished, Akl continued writing and publishing various poems as well as taking part in different discussions tackling his specialization and sometimes even giving lectures. "MULHAK"- a cultural supplement for one of Lebanon's most common newspapers An-Nahar- is currently still under his editorial director influence. Also, he teaches modern poetry and journalism at the Saint Joseph University in Beirut.

In 2003, Akl published an article in An-Nahar- titled "Letter to God" (in Arabic: رسالة إلى الله) which received a "harsh" response from the people, mainly because it was very daring and unprecedented. The newspaper published the article on the front page of the paper. Because its content offended some, it resulted in several filed lawsuits against him and even an act of setting the newspaper on fire in one of the villages in the North of Lebanon.

Also in 2016, Akl Awit won the Nikos Gatsos prize for his work "L'Échapée (The Orient of books)" that year.

== Bibliography in Arabic ==
- Erasing the exile of water - ماحياً غربة الماء - Beirut 1981
- Leaning on the flower of the body - المتكئة على زهرة الجسد - Beirut 1985
- Reading the obscurity - قراءة الظلام - Beirut 1986
- Under the sun of the inner body - تحت شمس الجسد الباطن - Beirut 1991
- I invited no one - لم أدعُ احداً - Beirut 1994
- Domain of the cypress - مقام السروة - Beirut 1996
- Open the days so that I disappear behind them - افتحي الأيام لأختفي وراءها - Beirut 1998
- Setting the dead free - سراح القتيل - Beirut 2001
- Another sky (anthology) - سماء أخرى - Cairo 2002
- Personal Bible - إنجيل شخصي - Beirut 2009
- Birth certificate - وثيقة ولادة - Beirut 2011
- Skyping - سكايبينغ - Beirut 2013
- The escape - L'Échapée - Beirut 2016
