= Dawit Yifru =

Ethiopian keyboardist and music arranger (born 1952)

Dawit Yifru (born 1952) is an Ethiopian keyboardist and music arranger.

Dawit is the founding member and Chairman of the Board of the Ethiopian Musicians Association. The association was established in the early 2000s in order to help pass the country's first copyright law.

He is primarily known for his long tenure performing with Roha Band, which had dominated contemporary Ethiopian music in the early 1980s and 1990s. He has also worked with other bands including Dahelak.
