= 2018 Lebanese general election in Bekaa II =

- 6 May 2018
- 6 seats in the Lebanese parliament for the Bekaa II constituency
| Party | Leader | Vote % | Seats | +/– |
|---|---|---|---|---|
| Future Movement | Saad Hariri | 26.92 | 1 | |
| Union Party | Abdel Rahim Murad | 22.37 | 1 | |
| PSP | Walid Jumblatt | 16.06 | 1 | |
| Amal | Nabih Berri | 13.38 | 1 | |
| Free Patriotic Movement | Gebran Bassil | 7.37 | 1 | |
This lists parties that won seats. See the complete results below.

Voting to elect six members of the Lebanese parliament took place in the Bekaa II district (one of three electoral districts in Bekaa region) on 6 May 2018, part of the general election of that year. The constituency had 143,653 who voted. The district elects 2 Sunni, 1 Druze, 1 Greek Orthodox, 1 Maronite, 1 Shia. It covers the West Bekaa and the Rashaya districts.

== Demographics ==
In the second Bekaa electoral district, nearly half of the electorate is Sunni (48.8%). 14.8% of the electorate is Druze, 14.7% Shia, 7.42% Greek Catholic, 7.22% Maronite and 7.16% Greek Orthodox.

== Voting ==
In the West Bekaa-Rachaya electoral district 3 lists were registered. The Future Movement and the Progressive Socialist Party formed a joint list. Notably this list included Mohammed Qar'awi, owner of the Bekaa Hospital, a personality previously linked to the March 8 Alliance. Amin Wahbi, founder and leader of the Democratic Left Movement was included on the Future list.

The "Best Tomorrow" list is mainly backed by the Amal Movement. In the end the Free Patriotic Movement did not join the Amal-sponsored list, leaving Greek Orthodox candidate Elie Ferzli to join it as an individual though he was still a member of FPM's bloc in parliament.

TV presenter Maguy Aoun is headed a third list, organized by civil society candidates.

The Lebanese Forces had tried to form a list with Ashraf Rifi to contest the election, but such a list did not materialize. Likewise, the Lebanese Democratic Party opted to withdrawal its candidate Dr. Nizar Zaki.

=== Candidates ===
| List | Sunni, 2 seats | | Shia, 1 seat | Druze, 1 seat | Maronite, 1 seat | Greek Orthodox, 1 seat |
|---|---|---|---|---|---|---|
| "Future for West Bekaa" | Ziad Qadri (Future) | Mohammed Qar'awi; 8,768 (13.19) (Future) | Amin Wahbi (Future) | Wael Abou Faour; 10,677 (16.06) (PSP) | Henri Chadid; 1,584 (2.38) | Ghassan Skaf |
| "Best Tomorrow" | Abdel Rahim Murad; 15,111 (22.73) (Union Party) | | Mohammad Nasrallah; 8,897 (13.38%) (Amal) | Faisal Daoud (Lebanese Arab Struggle Movement) | Naji Ghanem | Elie Ferzli; 4,899 (7.37) |
| "Civil Society" | Faisal Rahal | Ala Shamali | Ali Sobh | | Maguy Aoun | Joseph Ayoub |
ACE Project, Ministry of Interior and Municipalities
