= Bekaa II =

Electoral district of Lebanon

- Constituency for the Parliament of Lebanon
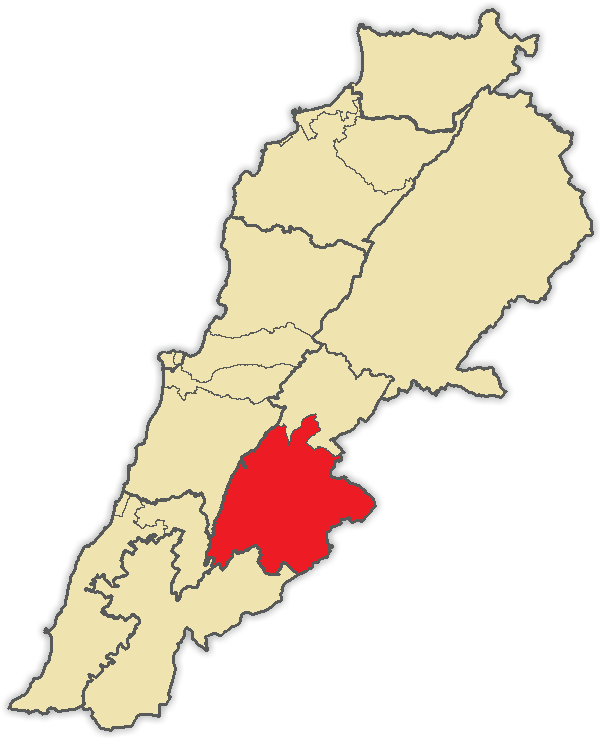
- Governorate: Bekaa
- Electorate: 143,653 (2018)

Current constituency
- Created: 2008
- Number of members: 6 (2 Sunni, 1 Druze, 1 Greek Orthodox, 1 Maronite, 1 Shia)

Bekaa II (Arabic: دائرة البقاع الثانية) is an electoral district in Lebanon, as per the 2017 vote law. The district elects 6 members of the Lebanese National Assembly - 2 Sunni, 1 Druze, 1 Greek Orthodox, 1 Maronite, 1 Shia. It covers the West Bekaa and the Rashaya districts.

In the 2017 vote law, the Bekaa II constituency retained the borders of the West Bekaa-Rachaya electoral district created by the 2008 Doha Agreement ahead of the 2009 Lebanese general election.

== Electorate ==
Nearly half of the electorate is Sunni (48.8%). 14.8% of the electorate is Druze, 14.7% Shia, 7.42% Greek Catholic, 7.22% Maronite and 7.16% Greek Orthodox.

Below data by qada (district) from 2017;

District	Sunni		Shia		Druze		Maronite		Greek Orthodox		Greek Catholic		Armenian Orthodox		Armenian Catholic		Syriac Orthodox		Syriac Catholic		Other Minorities (Note: The Minorities quota includes six different Christian sects Syriac Orthodox, Syriac Catholic, Latin Catholics, Assyrians, Chaldean Catholics and Copts.)		Evangelical		Jews		"Others" (Note: Presumably consisting mainly of individuals whose sectarian affiliation has not been identified and/or individuals not belonging to any of the 18 recognized sects.)		Total
District	No.	%	No.	%	No.	%	No.	%	No.	%	No.	%	No.	%	No.	%	No.	%	No.	%	No.	%	No.	%	No.	%	No.	%	No.
Rachaya	17,500	36.43	184	0.38	20,068	41.78	2,108	4.39	7,170	14.93	635	1.32	39	0.08	33	0.07	31	0.06	109	0.23	38	0.08	77	0.16			46	0.10	48,038
West Bekaa	50,547	54.40	20,505	22.07	466	0.50	8,635	9.29	2,709	2.92	9,024	9.71	73	0.08	27	0.03	79	0.09	41	0.04	146	0.16	347	0.37	1	0.00	312	0.34	92,912
Source: Lebanon Files

== 2009 election ==
Out of 122,989 eligible voters, 65,545 voted (53% participation).

Seat	March 14 candidates (all elected)		March 8 candidates		Others	
Sunni	Ziad Qadri	35,135	Abdel Rahim Murad (Union Party)	29,153	Farouq Dahrouj (Communist Party)	1,803
Sunni	Jamal Jarrah	33,626	Mohammed Qar'awi	27,584	5 minor candidates	15
Druze	Wael Abou Faour (PSP)	35,434	Faisal Daoud (Lebanese Arab Struggle Movement)	27,941		
Greek Orthodox	Antoine Saad	33,979	Elie Ferzli	29,389	Ibrahim Khouri	166
Maronite	Robert Ghanem	35,679	Henri Chadid	27,465		
Shia	Amin Wahbi (Democratic Left Movement)	34,666	Nasser Nasrallah	25,507	Mahmoud Abou Hamdan	3,138

Greek Orthodox candidate Norma Ferzli obtained 3 votes. There were 398 rejected ballots and 264 blank votes.

== 2018 election ==
=== Candidates ===
Ahead of the 2018 Lebanese general election, the first to use a proportional representation electoral system, three lists were registered. The Future Movement and the Progressive Socialist Party formed a joint list. Notably this list included Mohammed Qar'awi, owner of the Bekaa Hospital, a personality previously linked to the March 8 Alliance. Amin Wahbi, founder and leader of the Democratic Left Movement was included on the Future list.

The "Best Tomorrow" list was mainly backed by the Amal Movement. In the end the Free Patriotic Movement did not join the Amal-sponsored list, leaving Greek Orthodox candidate Elie Ferzli to join it as an individual.

TV presenter Maguy Aoun was heading a third list, organized by civil society elements.

The Lebanese Forces had tried to form a list with Ashraf Rifi to contest the election, but such a list did not materialize. Likewise, the Lebanese Democratic Party opted to withdrawal its candidate Dr. Nizar Zaki.

List		Sunni, 2 seats		Shia, 1 seat	Druze, 1 seat	Maronite, 1 seat	Greek Orthodox, 1 seat
"Future for West Bekaa"	Blue	Ziad Qadri (Future)	Mohammed Qar'awi (Future)	Amin Wahbi (Future)	Wael Abou Faour (PSP)	Henri Chadid	Ghassan Skaff
"Best Tomorrow"	Navy Blue	Abdel Rahim Murad (Union Party)		Mohammad Nasrallah (Amal)	Faisal Daoud (Lebanese Arab Struggle Movement)	Naji Ghanem	Elie Ferzli
"Civil Society"	Green	Faisal Rahal	Ala Shamali	Ali Sobh		Maguy Aoun	Joseph Ayoub
ACE Project, Ministry of Interior and Municipalities

=== Result by lists ===
List	Votes	% of electoral district	Seats	Members elected	Parties
"Best Tomorrow"	32,578	49.00	3	Murad, Nasrallah, Ferzli	Amal-Lebanese Arab Struggle
"Future for West Bekaa"	31,817	47.86	3	Abou Faour, Qar'awi, Chadid	Future-PSP
"Civil Society"	1,546	2.33	0		

=== Result by candidate ===
Name	Sect	List	Party	Votes	% of electoral district	% of preferential votes for sect seat	% of list	Elected?
Abdel Rahim Murad	Sunni (West Bekaa)	"Best Tomorrow"	Union Party	15,111	22.73	46.43	46.38	Yes
Wael Abou Faour	Druze (Rashaya)	"Future for West Bekaa"	PSP	10,677	16.06	83.95	33.56	Yes
Mohammad Nasrallah	Shia (West Bekaa)	"Best Tomorrow"	Amal	8,897	13.38	90.79	27.31	Yes
Mohammed Qar'awi	Sunni (West Bekaa)	"Future for West Bekaa"	Future	8,768	13.19	26.94	27.56	Yes
Ziad Qadri	Sunni (Rashaya)	"Future for West Bekaa"	Future	8,392	12.62	25.79	26.38	
Elie Ferzli	Greek Orthodox (Rashaya)	"Best Tomorrow"		4,899	7.37	81.06	15.04	Yes
Faisal Daoud	Druze (Rashaya)	"Best Tomorrow"	Lebanese Arab Struggle Movement	2,041	3.07	16.05	6.26	
Henri Chadid	Maronite (West Bekaa)	"Future for West Bekaa"		1,584	2.38	48.46	4.98	Yes
Ghassan Skaf	Greek Orthodox (Rashaya)	"Future for West Bekaa"		995	1.50	16.46	3.13	
Maguy Aoun	Maronite (West Bekaa)	"Civil Society"		847	1.27	25.91	54.79	
Naji Ghanem	Maronite (West Bekaa)	"Best Tomorrow"		838	1.26	25.63	2.57	
Amin Wahbi	Shia (West Bekaa)	"Future for West Bekaa"	Future	741	1.11	7.56	2.33	
Alaa Chamali	Sunni (West Bekaa)	"Civil Society"		168	0.25	0.52	10.87	
Ali Sobh	Shia (West Bekaa)	"Civil Society"		162	0.24	1.65	10.48	
Joseph Ayoub	Greek Orthodox (Rashaya)	"Civil Society"		150	0.23	2.48	9.70	
Faisal Rahal	Sunni (Rashaya)	"Civil Society"		106	0.16	0.33	6.86	
