= Lebanon First =

Lebanese political bloc

Lebanon First (Arabic: لبنان أولاً) was the former parliamentary bloc of the Future Movement in the Lebanese Parliament. Headed by Saad Hariri, it consisted of 19 deputies after the 2018 general election. It was disbanded and subsequently succeeded by the National Moderation bloc (Arabic: الإعتدال الوطني) after Hariri's electoral boycott.

== Election summary ==
Election	Seats	Change
1996	25 / 128 (20%)	New
2000	26 / 128 (20%)	▲1
2005	37 / 128 (29%)	▲11
2009	35 / 128 (27%)	▼2
2018	19 / 128 (15%)	▼16
2022	0 / 128 (0%)	Boycotted

== 2018–2022 session deputies ==
Name	Election Area	Political Affiliation	Sect
Saad Hariri	Beirut II	FM	Sunni
Nohad Machnouk	Beirut II	FM	Sunni
Tammam Salam	Beirut II	FM	Sunni
Roula Tabch	Beirut II	FM	Sunni
Nazih Najem	Beirut II	FM	Greek Orthodox
Walid Baarini	Akkar	FM	Sunni
Mohamad El Merehbi	Akkar	FM	Sunni
Mohamad Sleiman	Akkar	FM	Sunni
Hadi Hobeich	Akkar	FM	Maronite
Mohamad Kabbara	North II	FM	Sunni
Samir Jisr	North II	FM	Sunni
Dima Jamali	North II	FM	Sunni
Osman Alameddine	North II	FM	Sunni
Sami Fatfat	North II	FM	Sunni
Mohammad Al Hajjar	Mount Lebanon IV	FM	Sunni
Assem Araji	Bekaa I	FM	Sunni
Mohamad El Karaaoui	Bekaa II	FM	Sunni
Baker El Houjairi	Baalback	FM	Sunni
Bahia Hariri	Saida	FM	Sunni

== See also ==
- List of members of the 2018–2022 Lebanese Parliament
