= 2018 Lebanese general election in North I =

2018 Lebanese general election (North I)
- 6 May 2018

7 seats to the Parliament of Lebanon for the North I constituency
- Turnout: 46.7%
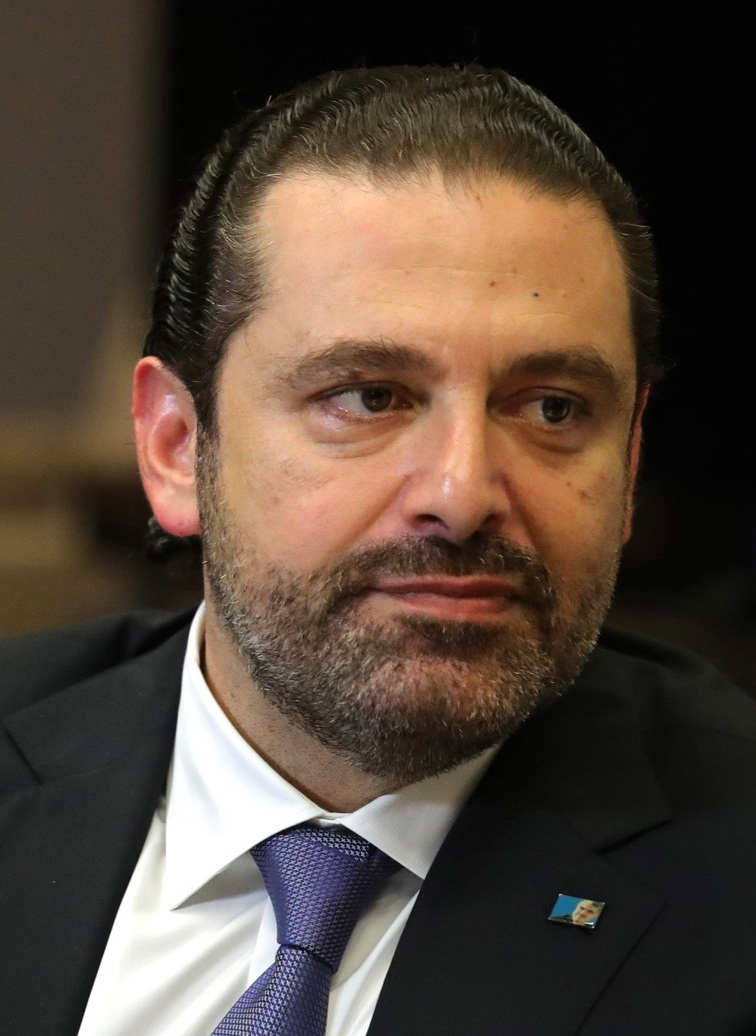

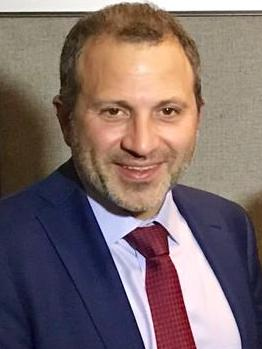
	First party	Second party	Third party
Leader	Saad Hariri	Gebran Bassil	Samir Geagea
Party	Future Movement	FPM	Lebanese Forces
Leader's seat	Beirut II	Batroun	Did not stand
Seats won	4	2	1
Popular vote	68,541	17,455	7,911
Percentage	51.38%	13.08%	5.93%

Voting to elect six members of the Lebanese parliament took place in the North I district (one of three electoral districts in the north Lebanon region) on 6 May 2018, part of the general election of that year. The constituency had 137,550 who voted. The district elects 3 Sunni, 2 Greek Orthodox, 1 Maronite, 1 Alawite. It covers the Akkar district.

== Demographics ==
The electorate is predominantly Sunni (67.5%). 14.7% of the electorate is Greek Orthodox, 10.9% Maronite, 4.97% Alawite, 1.05% Shia, 0.62% Greek Catholic and 0.29% from other Christian communities.

== Voting ==
In Akkar 6 lists were registered. The Future Movement opted for a list of its own (with Lebanese Forces candidate Qatisha as candidate for a Greek Orthodox seat). There is also a list supported by March 8 coalition "The Decision for Akkar" (headed by ex-MP Wajih Barini, in alliance with the Marada Movement and the Arab Democratic Party), the "Decision of Akkar" list, the "Strong Akkar" list (Free Patriotic Movement, al-Jamaa al-Islamiah, pro-Future independents), "Sovereign Lebanon" list (led by Ashraf Rifi) and the "Women of Akkar" list.

=== Candidates ===
List	Sunni, 3 seats			Greek Orthodox, 2 seats		Maronite, 1 seat	Alawite, 1 seat
"Future of Akkar"	Waleed Wajih Barini; 20,426 (15.31%) (Future)	Mohammad Tarek Talal Maaribi; 14,145 (10.60%) (Future)	Mohammed Suleiman; 14,911 (11.18%) (Future)	Wahbi Qatisha; 7,911 (5.93%) (Lebanese Forces)	Jean Moussa (Future)	Hadi Hobeiche; 13,055 (9.79%) (Future)	Khodr Habib (Future)
"Decision for Akkar"	Wajih Barini (Akkari People's Gathering)	Adnan Marab	Hussein Masri	Emile Abboud (SSNP)	Karim Rassi(Marada)	Michel Antonios Daher	Hussein Salloum
"Decision of Akkar"	Kamal Khazal	Ali Omar (Resistance Movement)	Basem Khalid			George Nader	
"Strong Akkar"	Mohammad Yahya	Mohamed Shadeed (Al-Jama'a al-Islamiyya)	Mahmoud Hadara	Riad Rahal	Asaad Dergham; 7,435 (5.57%) (FPM)	Jamie Jabbour (FPM)	Mustafa Ali Hussein; 1,353 (1.01%) (Lebanese People's Movement)
"Sovereign Lebanon"	Ibrahim Maraab	Bader Ismail	Ahmed Jowhar	Elie Saad	Joseph Wehbe	Ziad Bitar	Mohammed Rustam
"Women of Akkar"	Rola Murad	Suad Salah	Ghoulay Assaad	Nidal Skaf		Mary Khoury	
Source: Saida City, Al-Modon, An-Nahar Ministry of Interior and Municipalities
