= Lellouche =

Lellouche is a North-African surname; a variant form of Lellouch, Lelouch, Alloush, Allouch and Allouche. It is derived from the early Afroasiatic-Semitic family, where it is seen in the Berber and Arabian Peninsula Arabic cultures as el allouch (alush), meaning "the lamb". It is most-often used to signify a young male lamb, and remains a nickname or term of endearment in some North African and Arabic cultures.

Louche also means "cross-eyed" in French, and le/la Louche serves as nickname in its figurative meaning, a "shady" one, for some historical people in French texts.

Notable people with the name include:

== People and places named Allouch ==
=== People named Allouch ===
- Jean Allouch (born 1939), French psychoanalyst
- Moustapha Allouch (born 1958), Lebanese politician
- Soulyman Allouch (born 2002), Moroccan-Dutch footballer

=== Places named Allouch ===
- Dar Allouch, a town in Nabeul Governorate, Tunisia

== People named Allouche ==
- Adam Allouche (born 1993), French–Lebanese swimmer
- Danièle Allouche (born 1956), French bridge player
- Fabrice Allouche (born 1968), French boxer
- Guy Allouche (born 1939), French politician
- Harry Allouche (active 2004–now), French composer, pianist and music producer
- Jean-Paul Allouche (born 1953), mathematician, research director at CNRS
- Joëlle Allouche-Benayoun (born 20th century), French psychosociologist

== People named Alloush ==
- Fadi Alloush (born 1969), Lebanese footballer
- Kinda Alloush (born 1982), Syrian actress
- Zahran Alloush (1971–2015), Syrian rebel

== People named Lelouch ==
=== Claude Lelouch and relatives ===
- Claude Lelouch (born 1937), French film director, writer, cinematographer, actor and producer. He has 7 known children, 4 of them being active in film industry as either producers or actors.
- Marie-Sophie L., Claude's ex-wife, French actress, raw foodism advocate
- Christine Lelouch née Cochet (born 1963), Claude's ex-wife, French actress
- Salomé Lelouch (born 1983), Claude's daughter with Christine, French actress
- Sarah Lelouch (born 1976), Claude's daughter with Christine, TV presenter and producer
- Shaya Lelouch (born 1992), Claude's daughter with Christine, French actress
- Simon Lelouch (born 1969), Claude's son with Christine, French actor, director, screenwriter

=== Fictional people named Lelouch ===
- Lelouch Lamperouge, anime character from Code Geass

== People named Lellouch ==
- Emmanuel Lellouch (born 1963), Observatoire de Paris planetary scientist
  - 5519 Lellouch, a minor planet, named after Emmanuel Lellouch

== People named Lellouche ==
- Antony Lellouche (born 1981), French poker player
- Camille Lellouche (born 1986), French actress, comedian and singer
- Élie Lellouche (born 1952), French trainer of thoroughbred race horses
- Gilles Lellouche (born 1972), French actor, Philippe's brother
- Ofer Lellouche (born 1947), Israeli artist
- Pierre Lellouche (born 1951), French politician
- Philippe Lellouche (born 1966), French actor, Gilles's brother
- Sophie Lellouche (20th century), French director

== Others ==
- Bernard I (died 995), Count of Armagnac
- Vassili (1421–1448), Grand Prince of Muscovy
