= Ziad Majed =

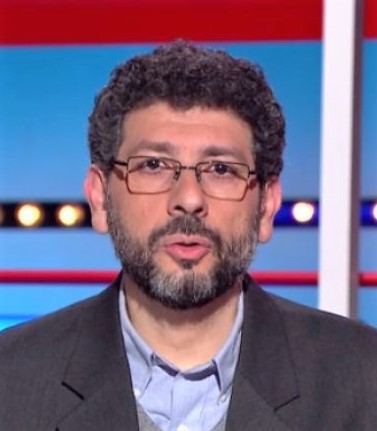
Ziad Majed

Ziad Majed (Arabic: زياد ماجد) is a Lebanese/French political researcher and university professor. He holds a PhD in political science from Sciences Po Paris, a master's degree in Arabic Literature and a BA in economics from the American University of Beirut.

== Career ==
He teaches Middle Eastern studies and International Relations at the American University of Paris and writes articles, papers and studies on reforms, democratic transitions, elections, civil society and citizenship published in Lebanon, Syria and the Arab region. International IDEA, the United Nations Development Program and other institutes, journals and newspapers in Paris, London, Washington DC, Berlin, Istanbul, Amsterdam and Beirut.

After working for 16 years at the Lebanese Red Cross, the Lebanese Center for Policy Studies (Beirut), the Institute for Democracy and Electoral Assistance (Stockholm), Internews (Beirut), he contributed in 2004 to the foundation of the Democratic Left Movement (along with the late Samir Kassir, Elias Khoury and many intellectuals, politicians, students and militants), and participated in the peaceful Independence Uprising in March 2005 against the Syrian regime's hegemony and political assassinations.

In 2006, he published On the Spring of Beirut, gathering texts and papers on Lebanese politics.

In 2007, he founded the Arab Network for the Study of Democracy with researchers from Morocco, Algeria, Tunisia, Egypt, Jordan, Lebanon, and Yemen.

In 2010, he published an essay analyzing Lebanese politics and its sectarian characteristics.

In 2014, he published Syria, the Orphan Revolution The books explore the situation in Syria and regional and international political dynamics related to the Syrian conflict. In 2021, an updated version was published in German.

In 2017, he published "Iran and its four Arab fronts".

In 2018, he co-authored Inside the mind of Bashar Al-Assad.

Ziad Majed lives in France, and regularly visits Lebanon and the Arab region to organize or attend political and cultural events.
