= Giselle Khoury =

Lebanese television presenter (1961–2023)

- جيزيل خوري
- Born: Giselle Azzi; 1961; Achrafieh, Beirut, Lebanon
- Died: 15 October 2023 (aged 62); Beirut, Lebanon
- Education: Holy Spirit University of Kaslik; Lebanese University
- Occupation: Journalist
- Years active: 1985–2023
- Spouse: Samir Kassir (died 2005)
- Children: 2

Giselle Khoury (Arabic: جيزيل خوري, romanized: Jīzīl Khūrī; née Azzi; 1961 – 15 October 2023) was a Lebanese–French journalist and talk show host. On her show Al Mashhad, she interviewed prominent figures and high-profile guests from the Arab world. She was married to Samir Kassir.

== Early life ==
Giselle Azzi was born in Achrafieh, Beirut. Her family was originally from Okaibe, Keserwan District. She studied history at the Holy Spirit University of Kaslik, and media at the Lebanese University.

== Career ==
Khoury started her career in late 1985 on LBC as a presenter of cultural talk shows. She joined the pan-Arab media group MBC in 2002 and contributed to the launch of the 24-hour Al-Arabiya news channel. During this time, Khoury worked on the Al-Arabiya political show Bil Arabi, hosting political decision-makers, heads of state, prime ministers and ministers of foreign affairs.

The show covered current affairs and political developments from the Arab world and beyond. In 2009, Khoury co-founded Al Rawi, a production company whose first project was a four-episode biography of the Palestinian leader Yasser Arafat.

=== BBC Arabic ===
In 2013, Khoury was hired by BBC Arabic to present the programme Al Mash'had (English: The Scene) as part of a new schedule for the network. It began its launch in early 2014. Produced in Lebanon, Al Mash'had featured eyewitness accounts of recent history in the Middle East. Khoury travelled to different countries to interview predominant Arab and international figures on events that have shaped history.

=== Sky News Arabia ===
In 2020, she moved to Sky News Arabia and presented With Gisele.

== Personal life and death ==
At the age of 20, Khoury married doctor Elie Khoury, and they had a son and a daughter. Khoury kept Elie's surname after their marriage. She later married journalist, writer and historian Samir Kassir until his assassination on 2 June 2005. After Kassir's death, Khoury became active in promoting Kassir's thoughts and co-founded the Samir Kassir Foundation and the SKeyes Center for Media and Cultural Freedom. She also founded the Beirut Spring Festival to commemorate Kassir in 2009.

Khoury died at her home in Beirut on 15 October 2023, aged 62, after a long struggle with cancer.

== Honours ==
- French Order of Chevalier of Legion of Honour
- Ordre des Arts et des Lettres
