= Ahmad Hariri =

Lebanese-Saudi politician

Ahmed Hariri
- أحمد حريري
- Born: Ahmed Hariri; 1984 (age 41–42); Riyadh, Saudi Arabia
- Other name: Ahmed
- Citizenship: Saudi Arabian, Lebanese
- Education: Georgetown University
- Occupation: Politician
- Political party: Future Movement
- Parent(s): Bahia Hariri, Mustafa

Ahmed El-Din Rafik Al-Hariri (Arabic: Arabic: أحمد حريري, romanized: Ah-med ad-Dīn Rafīq al-Ḥarīrī; born 1984) is a Lebanese-Saudi politician who is currently serving as the current president of the Future Movement from 2020. He is the nephew of Rafic Hariri and has been leading the Future Movement party since 2022.
