= Ziad Qadri =

Lebanese politician

Ziad El Kadri (Arabic: زياد القادري) is a Lebanese Sunni politician.

Kadri was born in Al-Bireh, Rashaya in 1979. He holds degrees in Law and Political Science. His father Nazem Qadri was a parliamentarian and cabinet minister.

Ziad El Kadri was elected to parliament from the West Beqaa-Rachaya electoral district in the 2009 Lebanese general election as a candidate of the Future Movement.

== See also ==
- Nazem Qadri
