= Beirut Spring Festival =

Annual multidisciplinary arts festival in Beirut, Lebanon

Beirut Spring Festival مهرجان ربيع بيروت
- Official logo
- Status: Active
- Genre: Multidisciplinary arts and culture
- Frequency: Annual
- Venue: Multiple venues
- Locations: Primarily Beirut, with programming elsewhere in Lebanon
- Country: Lebanon
- Years active: 2009–present
- Inaugurated: 17 June 2009; 17 years ago
- Founder: Giselle Khoury
- Most recent: 2026
- Previous event: 17th edition (2025)
- Next event: 19th edition (2027)
- Organiser: Samir Kassir Foundation
- People: Randa Asmar (festival director)
- French name: Le festival du printemps de Beyrouth
- Website: www.beirutspringfestival.org

The Beirut Spring Festival (Arabic: مهرجان ربيع بيروت; French: Le festival du printemps de Beyrouth) is an annual multidisciplinary arts and culture festival organised by the Samir Kassir Foundation in Beirut, Lebanon. It was founded in 2009 by Lebanese journalist Giselle Khoury in memory of her husband, the journalist, historian and writer Samir Kassir, who was assassinated in Beirut in 2005.

The festival presents theatre, music, dance, film, photography, installations, literary and public discussions, and other interdisciplinary work, using theatres as well as public and heritage spaces around the city. Its name is derived from Kassir's 4 March 2005 An-Nahar essay "Beyrouth, printemps des Arabes" ("Beirut, Spring of the Arabs").

A defining feature of the festival has been its emphasis on premieres, presenting international and regional productions, performances and artistic works that have not previously been shown in Lebanon. The festival has also historically maintained a free-admission policy, intended to broaden public access to cultural programming, particularly among younger audiences. As of September 2026, the festival has held eighteen editions.

== History ==
=== Origins and establishment ===
The festival was created by the Samir Kassir Foundation four years after Kassir's assassination. Khoury, who founded the foundation and later the festival, described the project as a way of making culture accessible to a broad public. Randa Asmar, a Lebanese actor and cultural practitioner, has been closely involved in the festival's programming from its early years and later became its director.

The first edition took place from 17 to 22 June 2009. Its programme included theatre, a multimedia installation, opera, contemporary performance, hip-hop and a public round table, with artists from Lebanon, Greece, Tunisia, France, Iran, Canada and the United Arab Emirates.

Photograph from The Bubble, a multimedia installation performance by Raja Ben Ammar and Phou Theatre of Tunisia, presented during the 1st Beirut Spring Festival on 18 June 2009 at The Dome, Beirut Downtown.

The second edition in 2010 included Moi, Anna Politkovskaïa, the contemporary ballet Pazzi, Ensemble Badila, Rayess Bek's Khartech 3al Zamann and a contemporary zajal production involving Zad Moultaka, Fadia Tomb El Hage and the Ars Nova Ensemble.

Khartech 3al Zamann by Rayess Bek and his band during the 2nd Beirut Spring Festival at Samir Kassir Garden, Beirut Downtown, 6 June 2010.

The festival expanded the range of participating artists during the following editions. In 2011 it hosted writer Tahar Ben Jelloun, the Egyptian band Massar Egbari, theatre and dance works, and a tribute to Lebanese singer Sabah.

Photograph from À mon âge je me cache encore pour fumer by Rayhana, directed by Fabian Chappuis, presented during the 3rd Beirut Spring Festival on 4 June 2011 at Tournesol Theatre, Tayyouneh, Beirut.

Le Jardin des délices by Compagnie Blanca Li during the 3rd Beirut Spring Festival at Al Madina Theatre, Hamra, Beirut, 5 June 2011.

The 2012 edition included Syrian clarinettist Kinan Azmeh, Turkish musician Mercan Dede, Egyptian screenwriter Waheed Hamed and a tribute to Lebanese composer and singer Elie Choueiri.

Hotel Methuselah by imitating the dog during the 4th Beirut Spring Festival at Tournesol Theatre, Tayyouneh, Beirut, 6 June 2012. The production combined live performance with projected film and digital cinematography.

In 2013, playwright and director Wajdi Mouawad was the festival's guest of honour. The programme included Incendies, Seuls, an encounter between Mouawad and Lebanese poet and critic Paul Chaoul, La Sentinelle with Jane Birkin, and a concert by Lebanese singer-songwriter Tania Saleh.

Seuls, a solo theatre work written, directed and performed by Wajdi Mouawad, during the 5th Beirut Spring Festival at Théâtre Monnot, Achrafieh, Beirut, 30–31 May 2013.

In 2014, the programme included Gandini Juggling's Smashed, Gravitational Waves, Issam Bou Khaled's Our Fathers, the discussion Voices of Hostages, and a concert involving Nasser Deen Al Touffar, Sayed Darwish and Hello Psychaleppo.

Smashed by Gandini Juggling during the 6th Beirut Spring Festival at Tournesol Theatre, Tayyouneh, Beirut, 4 June 2014. The contemporary juggling and choreography production featured nine jugglers and was inspired by the work of Pina Bausch.

Gravitational Waves by Compagnie Retouramont during the 6th Beirut Spring Festival at Ajami Square, Beirut Souks, 3 June 2014. The outdoor work combined vertical dance, sound, sculpture and projected 3D imagery.

=== 2015 expansion ===
The seventh edition in 2015 marked the tenth anniversary of Kassir's assassination. Instead of the festival's usual roughly week-long format, it ran from 3 May to 6 June and combined performance with exhibitions, debates and public-space projects.

Photograph from Beirut, the Timeless City, a large-scale multidisciplinary sound-and-light show conceived and artistically directed by Ivan Caracalla, presented during the 7th Beirut Spring Festival on 6 June 2015 at Martyrs' Square, Beirut Downtown.

Photograph from Beirut, the Timeless City, a large-scale multidisciplinary sound-and-light show conceived and artistically directed by Ivan Caracalla, presented during the 7th Beirut Spring Festival on 6 June 2015 at Martyrs' Square, Beirut Downtown.

Photograph from Beirut, the Timeless City, a large-scale multidisciplinary sound-and-light show conceived and artistically directed by Ivan Caracalla, presented during the 7th Beirut Spring Festival on 6 June 2015 at Martyrs' Square, Beirut Downtown.

The edition included Beirut Ideas, a series of eighteen discussions on freedom of expression and democratic change; the Change-Makers Forum; One Day in Beirut, a public photography exhibition involving more than one hundred photographers; and Alaa Minawi's light installation My Light Is Your Light. It concluded with Beirut, the Timeless City, a large-scale sound-and-light performance in Martyrs' Square conceived by Ivan Caracalla and incorporating music, poetry, orchestral performance, projections and Lebanese performers.

My Light Is Your Light by Alaa Minawi at Samir Kassir Square during the 7th Beirut Spring Festival, 4 May–4 June 2015. The light installation featured six human-scale neon figures representing refugees and displacement.

The Change-Makers Forum, part of the expanded 2015 Beirut Spring Festival programme.

=== 2016–2019 ===
The festival returned to a more compact format in 2016. Its eighth edition included Alexis Moncorgé's adaptation of Stefan Zweig's Amok, a concert by Lebanese band Adonis, and Gandini Juggling's 4x4: Ephemeral Architectures.

Photograph from 4x4: Ephemeral Architectures by Gandini Juggling, presented by the Beirut Spring Festival on 7 June 2016 at Al-Madina Theatre, Hamra, Beirut. The performance combined juggling and classical ballet.

The 2017 edition included Bridgman|Packer Dance, a concert by Bachar Mar-Khalifé, Rami Khalifé and Sary Khalifé, Tunisian singer Dorsaf Hamdani, and Carnivorous, a new theatre work by Issam Bou Khaled produced by the festival.

The tenth edition in 2018 included a photographic and sonic exhibition commemorating the Nakba, a concert by Egyptian-Palestinian musician Tamer Abu Ghazaleh, a tribute to Tunisian singer Lotfi Bouchnak, performances by British-Indian dancer and choreographer Aakash Odedra, and a production by the Yerevan State Puppet Theatre.

==== Lubnan album ====
Bouchnak's appearance at the tenth Beirut Spring Festival led to the release later that summer of Lubnan (لبنان), a nine-track album associated with the Samir Kassir Foundation. Bouchnak had performed with his orchestra on 4 June 2018 at MusicHall, Starco Center, in a tribute jointly organised by the Beirut Spring Festival and the Lebanese Ministry of Culture.

According to contemporary reporting in Asharq Al-Awsat, Bouchnak decided after the festival appearance to offer an album dedicated to Lebanon and the Lebanese. Randa Asmar said that the audience for his festival concert exceeded 1,000 people and that the reception he received contributed to the decision. Proceeds from the album were directed to the Samir Kassir Foundation.

Bouchnak later clarified in an interview with Laha that he had not released the album independently: he had given the songs to the Samir Kassir Foundation, which then selected the album's title, design and presentation. The physical edition was launched and signed by Bouchnak at Dar El Nimer for Arts and Culture in Beirut on 26 July 2018. Dar El Nimer described the songs as having been "generously offered" by Bouchnak and stated that proceeds from the release contributed to the Foundation.

Asharq Al-Awsat reported that the CD contained nine songs, several of them being released for the first time. Publicly documented titles include "Lubnan" (لبنان), "Ajras al-Awda" (أجراس العودة), "Kul Yawm" (كل يوم), "Ta'azina" (تعازينا), "Mughanni al-Hayy" (مغني الحي) and "Tafa'al Ya Rouhi Bil-Kheir" (تفاءل يا روحي بالخير). The title song "Lubnan" was written by Ali Ajami and composed by Abdel Hakim Al-Qayed. Credits published with "Tafa'al Ya Rouhi Bil-Kheir" identify lyrics by Lebanese poet Alexi Constantine and music by Abdullah Marish; the recording was made at Bouchnak's studio in Tunisia and mixed by Mohsen Matri.

Later in July, Bouchnak performed material associated with the release during an appearance at the Tyre International Festival at Beaufort Castle, including "Ajras al-Awda" and a song reported as "بحبك يا لبنان بجنون".

In 2019 the festival presented pianist Alexandra Dariescu's multimedia work The Nutcracker and I, the migration-themed play The Raft, directed by Cyrine Gannoun and Majdi Bou-Matar, and Beirut the Sea Lover, a live multimedia and 3D-mapping performance at Beirut's Roman Baths inspired by Kassir's history of the city.

Photograph from Beirut the Sea Lover, a live concert and 3D video-mapping by Milad Tauk with music by Elie Barrak, presented during the 11th Beirut Spring Festival on 14 June 2019 at the Roman Baths, Beirut Downtown.

=== Pandemic and economic crisis, 2020–2022 ===
The festival's usual format was interrupted in 2020 by Lebanon's political and economic crisis and the COVID-19 pandemic. After the Beirut port explosion of 4 August, the organisers mounted an online edition titled For the Love of Beirut on 25 August and 1 September. It brought back artists from earlier editions, including Kinan Azmeh, Bachar Mar-Khalifé, Alexandra Dariescu and Bridgman|Packer Dance.

Wajdi Mouawad opening the second evening of For the Love of Beirut, the online 12th Beirut Spring Festival, broadcast live on 1 September 2020.

In 2021 the thirteenth edition, Culture in Time of Crisis, took the form of a two-day hybrid conference about cultural policymaking in Lebanon, co-produced with the Friedrich Naumann Foundation and accompanied by performances.

Live multidisciplinary programming resumed in 2022 with a commissioned stand-up performance by Lebanese comedian Nour Hajjar, Dracula: The Untold Story by Imitating the Dog and Leeds Playhouse, and Chrystèle Khodr's listening performance Rise and Fall of Orient Swiss.

=== 2023–present ===
The fifteenth edition in 2023 presented The Last 15 Seconds, in tribute to Lebanese-Canadian theatre-maker Majdi Bou-Matar, and an Arabic-language presentation of Iranian playwright Nassim Soleimanpour's White Rabbit Red Rabbit, performed by Fouad Yammine. The Canadian company MT Space described the Beirut performances as the final stop of the thirteen-year tour of The Last 15 Seconds and as a return to Bou-Matar's country of origin.

The Last 15 Seconds by MT Space during the 15th Beirut Spring Festival at Sunflower Theatre, Beirut, 4–5 June 2023. The production explored terrorism through the deaths of filmmaker Mustapha Akkad and his daughter Rima.

Khoury died in October 2023. The 2024 edition was the first held after her death and was presented in her memory, with Asmar continuing as festival director. During the same period, as part of an ongoing process of institutional and digital development, the festival uplifted its visual identity and launched a new website consolidating its archive and documenting the programmes of all editions since its establishment in 2009. The 2024 programme included a public screening of season eight of the documentary series Zyara, the theatre work Mute, a concert for Palestine by Ziyad Sahhab and Rafic Abboud, and a spoken-word tribute to Khoury.

The seventeenth edition in 2025 coincided with the twentieth anniversary of Kassir's assassination. It included the public sound installation The Dream Manifesto, based on Kassir's 2004 text Bayan el Helm; the theatre production Jarret Ghaz Spéciale, dealing with Lebanese-Syrian memory and violence; a walking tour of sites associated with Kassir and Beirut; and, later in the summer, the photography exhibition 20 Years for Freedom.

In the same year, as part of Tech for Memory, a project launched by the Samir Kassir Foundation with funding from the European Union, the Foundation established Memory on Stage, a three-cycle artistic commissioning programme running across the 2025, 2026 and 2027 editions of the Beirut Spring Festival. Through annual calls for proposals, the programme invites artists, cultural practitioners and cultural organisations working in Lebanon to develop new theatre, music, dance, visual installation and multimedia projects engaging with memory, identity and cultural heritage. The first cycle, Memory on Stage 2025, resulted in the production of Jarret Ghaz Spéciale, which premiered during the seventeenth edition of the festival.

Originally scheduled for the spring, the eighteenth edition was postponed to 24 August–26 September 2026 amid the 2026 Iran war and its spillover into Lebanon. Locally based artists, cultural practitioners and cultural organisations were invited to submit new projects for the eighteenth edition of the festival. The call for applications Memory on Stage 2026 covered theatre, music, dance, visual installations and multimedia work and provided a total funding envelope of up to EUR 50,000 for selected projects. That edition comprised three multidisciplinary projects presented across eleven evenings and four venues in Beirut and Tripoli: Echoes of the North: The Unspoken Memory, combining documentary film and photography to explore memories of the Lebanese Civil War and the Syrian presence in northern Lebanon; A Lover's Manifesto P2: The Lebanese Experiment, Alfred Tarazi's film installation examining Beirut and Lebanon between 1920 and 1958; and Echoes of a City's Forgotten Heritage ... in C Minor, a film-performance documenting the restoration of Beirut's architectural heritage following the 2020 port explosion.

English Promo of the Beirut Spring Festival 2026, Lebanon

Writing in Levant Time during the 2026 edition, Jad al-Akhawi, who had known Kassir personally, reflected on the festival through Alfred Tarazi's A Lover's Manifesto P2: The Lebanese Experiment. He described Tarazi's use of newspapers, photographs, advertisements, music, cinema, architecture and material from everyday life as a means of engaging with Lebanon's historical archive beyond nostalgia, linking the work to broader questions of memory, national identity and cultural preservation. Al-Akhawi also observed that the festival's audience had become increasingly intergenerational, bringing together students, journalists, artists, academics, writers and activists around culture and public debate.

The programme is scheduled to continue with Memory on Stage 2027. As of September 2026, a call for artistic projects was open for work to be developed and premiered during the nineteenth edition of the Beirut Spring Festival, scheduled for spring 2027.

== Programme and artistic profile ==
The Beirut Spring Festival is multidisciplinary. Across its editions it has presented theatre, contemporary dance, classical and experimental music, popular music, hip-hop, film, documentary, photography, puppetry, comedy, literary encounters, installations, projection mapping and public debates.

Its programming has generally combined visiting international artists with Lebanese and regional work. Khoury said in 2017 that the festival aimed to balance performances from abroad with Lebanese work and to make culture accessible to younger audiences. The festival has also commissioned and produced original works, including Issam Bou Khaled's Carnivorous in 2017, the multimedia production Beirut the Sea Lover in 2019., theatre play Jarret Ghaz Spéciale in 2025, as well as documentary and photo exhibition Echoes of the North: The Unspoken Memory, film installation A Lover's Manifesto P2: The Lebanese Experiment, and film-performance Echoes of a City's Forgotten Heritage ... in C Minor in 2026.

Artists appearing across the festival's history have included Wajdi Mouawad, Jane Birkin, Tahar Ben Jelloun, Kinan Azmeh, Mercan Dede, Tania Saleh, Aakash Odedra, Tamer Abu Ghazaleh, Alexandra Dariescu, Bachar Mar-Khalifé, Rami Khalifé, Dorsaf Hamdani and Nassim Soleimanpour.

== Visual identity ==
The festival's recurring visual identity is based on a clouded blue spring sky crossed by a red bird with outstretched wings. The bird evokes freedom, while its red colour refers to the human cost associated with struggles for freedom.

== Access and venues ==
Free admission was built into the festival's model from its early editions. Contemporary and retrospective coverage has repeatedly identified free access as a central feature, particularly in relation to young audiences and Lebanon's economic conditions.

The festival does not operate from a single permanent venue. It has used theatres, universities, galleries, cinemas, historic sites and public spaces including Martyrs' Square, Samir Kassir Square and Garden, the Roman Baths, the American University of Beirut, Al Madina Theatre, Théâtre Monnot and the Tournesol Theatre. In 2026, programming was also presented in Tripoli, marking a geographical expansion beyond Beirut for that edition.

== Organisation ==
The festival is organised by the Samir Kassir Foundation, a non-profit organisation established after Kassir's assassination. Khoury founded the festival in 2009 and remained closely identified with it until her death in 2023. Randa Asmar, who was involved in programming from the festival's early years, is its director.

The festival's individual editions have been supported through varying combinations of private sponsors, cultural institutions, diplomatic missions, foundations and international donors.

== Editions ==
Edition	Year	Dates	Selected programme and context
1st	2009	17–22 June	First edition; theatre, multimedia, opera, dance, hip-hop and public discussion.
2nd	2010	3–8 June	Moi, Anna Politkovskaïa, Pazzi, Ensemble Badila, Rayess Bek and contemporary zajal.
3rd	2011	2–8 June	Tahar Ben Jelloun, Massar Egbari, theatre and dance, and a tribute to Sabah.
4th	2012	3–9 June	Kinan Azmeh, Mercan Dede, Waheed Hamed and a tribute to Elie Choueiri.
5th	2013	26–31 May	Wajdi Mouawad as guest of honour; Incendies, Seuls, Jane Birkin and Tania Saleh.
6th	2014	3–7 June	Gandini Juggling, theatre, dance, public discussion and rap/electronic music.
7th	2015	3 May–6 June	Expanded edition marking ten years since Kassir's assassination; Beirut Ideas, Change-Makers Forum and Beirut, the Timeless City.
8th	2016	3–7 June	Amok, Adonis and Gandini Juggling's 4x4: Ephemeral Architectures.
9th	2017	3–7 June	Packer Dance, Bachar and Rami Khalifé with Sary Khalifé, Dorsaf Hamdani and Carnivorous.
10th	2018	15 May–7 June	Programme marking the festival's first decade; Nakba exhibition, Aakash Odedra, Lotfi Bouchnak, Tamer Abu Ghazaleh and Yerevan State Puppet Theatre. Bouchnak's appearance was followed by the Foundation-associated album Lubnan later that summer.
11th	2019	9–14 June	The Nutcracker and I, The Raft and Beirut the Sea Lover.
12th	2020	25 August; 1 September	Online edition For the Love of Beirut after COVID-19 and the Beirut port explosion.
13th	2021	18–19 June	Hybrid Culture in Time of Crisis conference and performances.
14th	2022	3–5 June	Nour Hajjar, Dracula: The Untold Story and Rise and Fall of Orient Swiss.
15th	2023	4–6 June	The Last 15 Seconds and White Rabbit Red Rabbit; tribute to Majdi Bou-Matar.
16th	2024	30 May–20 June	First edition after Gisèle Khoury's death; Zyara, Mute, Concert for Palestine and a tribute to Khoury.
17th	2025	June; August–September	Twentieth anniversary of Kassir's assassination; The Dream Manifesto, Jarret Ghaz Spéciale, a Beirut walking tour and 20 Years for Freedom.
18th	2026	24 August–26 September	Three multidisciplinary projects on memory and heritage in Beirut and Tripoli; edition postponed from spring.

== See also ==
- Samir Kassir
- Samir Kassir Foundation
- Culture of Lebanon
- Theatre in Lebanon
