= Al Hurriya Liberal Network =

Al Hurriya Liberal Network شبكة الحرية الليبرالية
- President: Mohamed Rherass
- Vice-President: Mustapha Allouch
- Founded: 20 March 2021
- Ideology: Liberalism

Website
- www.alhurriya.network

The Al Hurriya Liberal Network (Arabic: شبكة الحرية الليبرالية, AHLN) is a network of liberal political parties in the Middle East and North African region (MENA) founded on 20 March 2021.

Starting 2019, several liberal parties started cooperating to spread values such as human rights, democracy and the rule of law. The aim of the founding members is to unify and institutionalize relations between the MENA region liberal parties.

== Governance ==
- President: Mohamed Rherass, Morocco, Mouvement Populaire
- Vice-President: Mustapha Allouch, Lebanon, Future Movement

== Members ==
Five organisations are the founding members of AHLN. Parties marked with an asterisk do not appear as members on the network website as of August 2026.

| Country | Party | Status |
|---|---|---|
| Tunisia | Afek Tounes | Party Member |
| Egypt | Free Egyptians Party* | Party Member |
| Jordan | Free Thought Forum* | Associate Member |
| Lebanon | Future Movement | Party Member |
| Morocco | Mouvement Populaire* | Party Member |

=== Other members ===
(as of August 2026)

- Egyptian Liberal Forum
- Association Jeunesse et Avenir (Morocco)
- Ahrar – The Syrian Liberal Party
