= Lebanese International University (Mauritania) =

University in Mauritania

Coordinates: 18°5′30″N 15°58′1″W

- Type: Private
- Location: Nouakchott, Mauritania
- Campus: Urban
- Website: University website

Lebanese International University, founded in 2008, is a university located in Nouakchott, Mauritania. It is part of the private Lebanese International University group. A new campus for the university was inaugurated in 2014.

A 2024 assessment report by the Mauritanian higher education quality assurance authority (AMAQ-ES) indicated that university had 7 permanent and 50-60 part-time teaching staff, with a student population of 415–450. The report noted the difficulty in recruiting tenured staff, and recommended increasing student enrolment.
