= Mustapha Allouch =

Lebanese politician

- Born: 24 July 1958 (age 67); Tripoli, Lebanon
- Occupations: General Surgeon, Politician and Former Member of the Lebanese Parliament

Mustapha Allouch (born 24 July 1958) is a Lebanese politician and a former member of the Lebanese Parliament. He represented the constituency of Tripoli from 2005 until 2009 as a member of the Future Movement and is known as vocal member of the March 14 Alliance.

== Early life ==
Allouch was born and raised in Tripoli, Lebanon. Son of Mohamad (Abu Mustapha) Allouch, a merchant and a political activist, Mustapha Allouch spent the early years of his life in Bab El Tabbaneh. As a teenager, before the start of the Lebanese Civil War, he was active in various Marxist and Arab Nationalist movements and fought in the first two years of the Civil War alongside the Palestine Liberation Organization.

Disillusioned with the violence of the civil war, Allouch enrolled at the American University of Beirut (AUB) in premedical sciences after briefly studying law in France. In 1985, Allouch earned his M.D. from AUB and was married to his wife, with whom he has since had three children. During his time at the university, Allouch was an active member of its judo club. He participated in many tournaments and was the champion of Lebanon in his weight class on several occasions. In 1986, he represented Lebanon in an International Judo Championship held in France. He has achieved 6th Dan (Shodan) in judo.

In 1991, Allouch completed his residency in general surgery at the American University of Beirut Hospital during which he served as the chief resident. He subsequently participated in a Transplant Surgery Fellowship at the University of Miami which he completed before returning to Lebanon and specifically Tripoli in 1993.

== Political career ==
Allouch has been an active member of the Future Movement since 1997 and after a strong performance in the 2004 municipal election of Tripoli where he garnered the highest number of votes, he was sought a parliamentary seat in the 2005 parliamentary elections. He ran on the Future movement ticket as part of the March 14 Alliance in the aftermath of Prime Minister Rafic Hariri’s assassination. He represented the district of Tripoli in Parliament from 2005 to 2009.

In the summer of 2006, Allouch radically opposed positions and actions of Hezbollah that led to the 2006 Lebanon War between the militant group and Israel. Since then, Allouch continues to staunchly oppose Hezbollah and criticizes their close connection and allegiance to Iran. At the same time, he is known for his criticism of religious fundamentalism in Lebanon and is often criticized by his more conservative peers in the Future Movement for his strong support for civil laws and the separation of state from religious institutions.

Allouch is also criticized by leftists and progressives in Lebanon about belonging to a center-right party in the Future Movement, however Allouch is known to actively champion social democratic and progressive ideals within his party and the March 14 Alliance.

He becomes vice-president of the Al Hurriya Liberal Network in March 2021.

Allouch publishes columns regularly in the daily newspapers Al-Mustaqbal and Al Joumhouria.
