= SKeyes Center for Media and Cultural Freedom =

- Formation: November 2007
- Location: Beirut, Lebanon
- Owner: the Samir Kassir Foundation
- Website: SKeyes Media

The Skeyes Center for Media and Cultural Freedom (Samir Kassir Eyes) monitors the violation against freedom of press and culture in the Middle East while promoting the establishment of an Arab opinion that is in favor of freedom of expression. It achieves its goals through online publications of reports and periodic organization of workshops, exhibits and conferences on press and cultural freedom related issues. Furthermore, SKeyes also provide legal, financial and moral support to journalists facing prosecution.

== History ==
SKeyes Center for Media and Cultural Freedom was established by the Samir Kassir Foundation in November 2007 in Beirut, Lebanon. The "S" and "K" in SKeyes stand for "Samir Kassir", which is a tribute to the slain Lebanese journalist. Currently, SKeyes operates in Lebanon, Syria, Palestine, and Jordan through its network of correspondents and publishes online reports on cultural and press freedom in these countries, though it hopes to expand its scope to cover the entire Arab world in the future.

== Financial backing ==
SKeyes received its founding grant from Foundation for the Future who is dedicated to freedom of expression. Skeyes also has financial support from the European Union and the International Freedom of Expression Exchange (IFEX).

== Notable work ==
=== Mamnou3 ===
Mamnou3 is a Lebanese mockumentary web series that pokes fun at the country's censorship bureau by examine its "day-to-day inner workings". The series exposes the bureau's absurdity satirically in an effort to challenge the validity of the government's censorship practices.
