= Lebanese International University =

Private university in Lebanon

Coordinates: 33°53′4″N 35°29′43″E

- Motto: affordable quality education .
- Type: Private
- Established: April 2001; 25 years ago
- President: Abdul Rahim Mourad
- Students: 2 full-time
- Location: Beqaa Valley, Lebanon
- Campus: Urban
- Website: Official website

The Lebanese International University (LIU; Arabic: الجامعة اللبنانية الدولية) is a private university established by the philanthropist and former Lebanese defense and education minister Abdul Rahim Mourad. The language of instruction is English.

== History ==
The Lebanese International University was established in April 2001, as "The Bekaa University" under Presidential Decree No.5294 as, with its campus constructed within the western region of the Beqaa Valley; at Al-Khyara, the West Beqaa (al-Beqaa al-Gharbi). Having graduated its first Freshman class in June 2002, a new campus in Beirut was opened and the name was changed to "Lebanese International University", or LIU in short. Another five campuses were later built: next to Sidon in south Lebanon, Tyr, Nabatieh, Tripoli, Halba and Mount Lebanon.

LIU created buildings in Aden, Sanaa and Taiz in Yemen as well as two additional campuses in Mauritania and Senegal. LIU opened branches also in Saudi Arabia, the United Arab Emirates, Egypt, and Syria.

== The campuses ==
The Beqaa campus

LIU has nine campuses at different locations in Lebanon: Bekaa, Beirut, Saida, Nabatieh, Mount Lebanon, Tripoli, Tyre, Rayak and Halba-Akkar. The Bekaa Campus is the ‘mother’ of LIU’s many Lebanon based campuses. It has a main cafeteria with more than 500 seating capacity, several shops and eateries, dormitories for both female and male students, and recreational facilities including a pool, a football stadium, several green fields and parking areas. The Beirut Campus is located not far from the Beirut Central District and consists of seven buildings. The campus also has cafeterias; large auditoriums, underground parking, and housing for female and male students in University owned apartment buildings adjacent to campus.

=== Beirut Campus ===
The Beirut campus is located within a residential area of Mouseitbeh in west Beirut. It consists of seven buildings, Blocks A to G. The first building, as shown on the picture, is Block-A. This building is about five to six stories high, and the office of the campus manager can be found at the fifth floor.

The second building, Block-B is about eight stories high. Three stories below, the university has an underground parking space and two auditoriums. Major facilities for students, such as the registration office, the business office, and student affairs office, are located at the first floor of the building. The university cafeteria can also be found in this story. The third building, Block-C, is almost the biggest building among the Blocks, it is about nine stories high. Two stories below considered as parking, Block-C contains at his ninth floor the Mass Communication offices and Specialized Rooms as a Studio.

Starting Autumn 2011-2012, three new blocks will be founded to acquire the upcoming number of students, named as Block D, E & G made of five stories each, in addition to the dorms made for the transferring students moving from other campuses to Beirut.

=== Saida Campus ===
The Saida Campus - the second largest in terms of enrolment among LIU campuses.

=== Tyre Campus ===
The Tyre Campus is the first university in history of the Tyre region which offers students a choice from more than 40 degree programs. The Rayak and Halba-Akkar campus is the newest of LIU campuses.

== International expansion ==
In September 2006, the university announced the opening of its Yemeni campus in Sanaa.

The University also has campuses in Yemen, Morocco, Senegal and Mauritania.

== Faculties ==
The university has five faculties:

- School of Arts and Sciences
- School of Engineering
- School of Business and Management
- School of Pharmacy
- School of Education

== School of Education ==
=== Degrees Offered ===
The School of Education at LIU offers the following degrees: Bachelor's of Education, Teaching Diploma and a Master's of Education. To earn a bachelor's degree (a 3-year program), students must complete a minimum of 99 credit hours. For a teaching diploma (a one-year program) students must complete 24 credit hours. For a master's degree (a two-year program), students must complete 39 credit hours.

=== Admission Requirements ===
Applicants prior applying to The School of Education at LIU, must pass the Lebanese Baccalaureate II (any strand) or its equivalent as specified by the Lebanese Ministry of Education and Higher Education. Also, an English Placement Exam or the International TOEFL is required to determine their eligibility.

=== Programs of Study ===
Majors or Programs of Study offered by the School of Education
Undergraduate majors/Programs of study	Graduate majors/Programs of study
Teacher Education (Options: Math & Physics or Chemistry & Biology)	Teaching Diploma
TEFL (Teaching of English as a Foreign Language)	Master of Education in Curriculum Design
Instructional Technology	Master of Education in Educational Management
Childhood Education	Master of Education in TEFL
English Language & Literature	

=== Clubs ===
At LIU School of Education, students may join the Book/Debate Club where they discuss diverse perspectives related to a certain topic or book.

== Events and Initiatives ==
=== School of Education ===
Events hosted by the School of Education
Event title	Type of Event
Stress Management	Lecture
The Eighth International Arab Conference on Quality Assurance in Higher Education (IACQA' 2018) in the Arab World	Conference
Everyone’s Different: Working with Multiple Intelligence in the Language Classroom	Workshop
STEM Workshops on Teaching Strategies	Workshop
ATEL workshop (Association of Teachers of English in Lebanon) Conflict Resolution and Communication Skills	Workshop
Autism Spectrum Disorder	Panel Discussion
Best Practices Professional Development Workshops	Workshops

== School of Arts and Sciences ==
=== Programs of Study ===
           The School of Arts & Sciences includes the following different Majors:

Physical Sciences:	Biological Sciences:	Diploma in Biomedical Science:	Computer Science & IT	Food Science:	Fine Arts & Design	Communication Arts
Mathematics	Biology	Medical Laboratory Technology	Computer Science	Nutrition and Dietetics	Graphic Design	Translation & Interpretation
Physics	Biochemistry	-	Information Technology	Food Science and Technology	Interior Design	Radio & TV
Chemistry	Biomedical Science	-	-	-	-	Public Relations
-	-	-	-	-	-	Journalism
-	-	-	-	-	-	Advertising

Degrees Offered

           The School of Arts & Sciences offers programs leading to the Bachelor Degrees in all major areas listed above. The School also offers a Diploma in Medical Laboratory Technology as a Graduate Program.[8]

== The School of Business ==
=== Programs of study ===
Majors or Programs of Study
Undergraduate majors/Programs of study	Graduate majors/Programs of study
Accounting Information Systems	Master's of Business Administration
Economics	LIU-Worms Master's of Business Administration
Banking & Finance	
Hospitality Management	
Business Management	
Management Information Systems	
International Business Management	
LIU-Worms International Business Management	

== The School of Engineering ==
=== Programs of study ===
Majors or Programs of Study
Undergraduate majors/Programs of study	Graduate majors/Programs of study
Electronic Engineering / Emphasis On Biomedical	Master's of Science in Electronic Engineering / Emphasis On Biomedical
Computer Engineering	Master's of Science in Computer and Communication Engineering
Electrical Engineering	Master's of Science In Electrical Engineering
Electronics Engineering	Master's of Science in Electronics Engineering
Mechanical Engineering	Master's of Science in Mechanical Engineering
Surveying Engineering	Master's of Science in Surveying Engineering
Communication Engineering	Master's of Science in Industrial Engineering
Industrial Engineering	

== The School of Pharmacy ==
=== Programs of study ===
Majors or Programs of Study
Undergraduate majors/Programs of study	Graduate majors/Programs of study
Pharmacy	Doctor of Pharmacy

== The Scope Magazine ==
The Scope is the student-run magazine published by the Lebanese International University (LIU).

== Name Change ==
In June 2017, LIU changed its name to International University of Beirut in all but the Bekaa campuses - Khiara and Rayak - where it remained LIU.
