= Hadi Hobeich =

Lebanese politician

Cheikh Hadi Hobeich حبيش هادي
- هادي حبيش

Member of Parliament of Lebanon
- Incumbent
- Assumed office 1 May 2005

Personal details
- Born: 1 July 1974 (age 52) Al Qoubaiyat, North Lebanon, Lebanon
- Party: Future Movement
- Spouse: Cynthia Karkafi
- Education: College La Sagesse St Joseph – Ashrafieh

Hadi Hobeich (born July 1, 1974), is a Lebanese politician, lawmaker and ex-MP of the Akkar district in North Lebanon between 2005-2022. He is part of the March 14 alliance and a member of the Future Movement, presided by Saad Hariri.

== Early years ==
Hadi Hobeich, born in Qobayeit, is one of three children of Cheikh Faouzi Hobeich, former MP and Minister of Culture and Education, and Therese Daher. In high school, he enrolled with the Jesuits, at the college of Rosaries of Louaizeh, Kesrouan. He attended the University of Sagesse where he graduated from Law School in 1997. He interned at the office of former judge Dr. Mounif Hamdan from 1998 until 2001. He then founded his own law firm and started his political activism. In 2006, he married Cynthia Karkafi, daughter of Bechara Maurice Karkafi. They have four children: Christina, Tiffany, Charbel, Joseph.

== Political career ==
In 2004, he starts his political career during the municipal elections of his hometown Al Qoubaiyat, where he defeated incumbent MP Mikhail Daher. In 2005, he was the youngest elected MP in the Parliament of Lebanon at the age of 30, representing the Maronite seat in Akkar. He integrated the parliamentary block of Future Movement and became a member of the Parliamentary Committee on Administration and Justice. In 2009 he was re-elected MP for the Akkar district, with 63.1% of the votes at the Lebanese parliamentary elections of 2009 thereby increasing his lead over his closest competitor. In 2010 and 2016, he leads the re-election of his list at the Al Qoubaiyat municipality council against the Free Patriotic Movement. During his career, he was targeted and subjected to Sham "investigation" as part of Hezbollah and its FPM allies systematic corruption methods to control politics and judicial system in Lebanon.

== Parliamentary work ==
He is an advocate for increasing the accountability of ministers for their governmental performance. He questioned the Minister of Energy, Alan Tabourian on 19/01/2009, about the long-term rupture of electricity in Akkar as well as the subsequent suspicious rationing in the region, the disappearance of diesel fuel stocks, and the fate of electrical transformers intended for Akkar. He has also drafted several laws, most notably the regulations submitted on 05/11/2008 to amend some provisions of the law for establishing the Constitutional Council. On 22/09/2006, he contributed an amount of 3 billion pounds of the allocations of the Ministry of Public work and transport for the rehabilitation and paving of roads and streets in Akkar province.
