= Abdul Rahim Mrad =

Lebanese Sunni politician

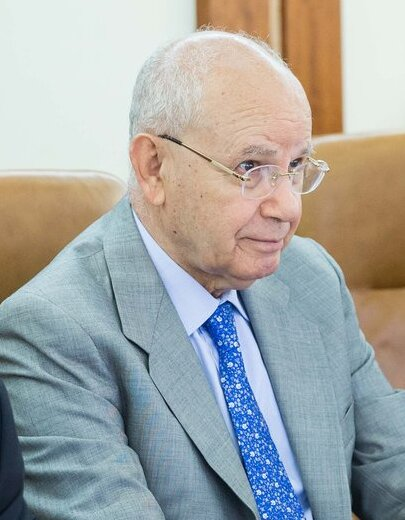
Abdul Rahim Mrad meeting with Ilyas Umakhanov, 2015

Abdul Rahim Mrad (Arabic: عبد الرحيم مراد) is a Lebanese politician. He was born in 1942. A former minister, he is the founder of the Lebanese International University (in 2001). He is the leader of the Union Party.

Born to a Sunni family, he studied Business Administration and Law. Mourad lived in São Paulo, Brazil for five years

Mourad was inducted to parliament in 1990, replacing Nazem Qadri. He was elected to parliament in the 1992, 1996, 2000, 2018, 2022 elections. He served in a number of ministerial positions: Minister for Professional Education and Technical Training in 1994, Education and Higher Learning in 2000, Minister of State in 2003 and Minister of Defense from 2004 to 2005. He stood as the March 8 Alliance candidate for a Sunni seat in West Bekaa-Rachaya in the 2009 Lebanese general election, obtaining 29,095 votes (45.1%).
