= Henri Chedid =

Lebanese Maronite politician and businessman

Henri Chedid (Arabic: هنري شديد) is a Lebanese Maronite politician and businessman. Chedid was born in Kherbet-Qanafar village, West Bekaa. He studied theology and philosophy at the Pontifical Lateran University in Rome, later studying business administration and political science in the United States (at Georgetown University in Washington, D.C., and the University of Maryland).

Chedid spent years in Saudi Arabia, working at companies such as DHL. In 1979 he set up a branch office of DHL in Lebanon.

Chedid stood as a candidate in the 1992 Lebanese general election. Chedid was declared elected to parliament in the 1996 Lebanese general election, but his mandate was cancelled as his election was overturned after a complaint filed by parliamentarian Robert Ghanem. He stood as the March 8 Alliance candidate for the Maronite seat in West Bekaa-Rachaya in the 2009 Lebanese general election, finishing in second place with 27,415 votes (42.5%).

As of 2017 he served as the head of the West Bekaa Country Club.
