= Nazem Qadri =

Lebanese politician

Nazem Kadri
- Died: 21 September 1989; West Beirut
- Occupations: Lawyer, Member of Parliament

Nazem Kadri (Arabic: ناظم القادري) or Nazem El-Kadri (died 21 September 1989) was a Lebanese lawyer and politician.

== Career ==
Qadri was a member of the Lebanese parliament from the Beqaa region, including in the long-running Parliament after the elections of 1971.

He was appointed minister of labor and social affairs in the government led by then prime minister Selim Hoss under then president Elias Sarkis from 16 July 1979 to 25 October 1980. After the death of the interior minister Bahij Takieddine, he was additionally given that portfolio starting 18 February 1980.

== Assassination ==
Nazem Qadri was assassinated in west Beirut on 21 September 1989, two days before the Taif Accord. His driver was also killed, and two bystanders were wounded in the attack.

== See also ==
- List of assassinated Lebanese people
- Ziad Qadri
