= Faisal Daoud =

Lebanese Druze politician

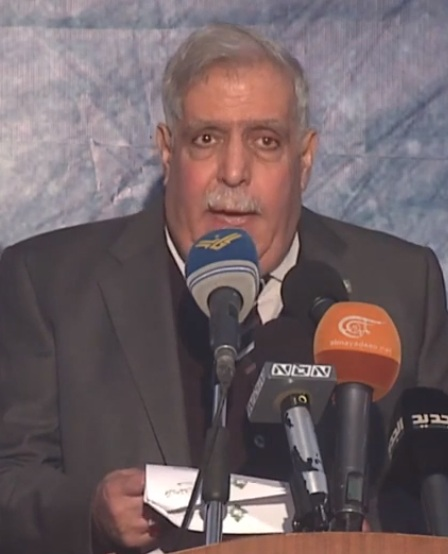
Faisal Daoud

Faisal Daoud (Arabic: فيصل الداوود) is a Lebanese politician. He was born in 1954. Daoud served as general secretary of the Lebanese Arab Struggle Movement between 1986 and 2014.

Born to a Druze family, he studied Arabic literature at the Lebanese University. He was inducted to parliament in 1991, replacing his father Salim Daoud. He was elected to parliament in the 1992, 1996 and 2000 elections.

He stood as the March 8 Alliance candidate for the Druze seat in West Bekaa-Rachaya in the 2009 Lebanese general election, obtaining 28,026 votes (43.4%).
