= Alloush =

Alloush is a surname. Notable people with the surname include:

- Fadi Alloush (born 1969), Lebanese footballer
- Kinda Alloush (born 1982), Syrian actress
- Zahran Alloush (1971–2015), Syrian rebel military leader
