= Amin Wahbi =

Lebanese politician and cardiologist (born 1952)

Amin Wehbe (Arabic: امين وهبي; born 1952) is a Lebanese Shia politician and cardiologist. In 2004, he became one of the founding leaders of the Democratic Left Movement. He was elected to parliament in the 2009 Lebanese general election.
