= Lebanese Arab Struggle Movement =

Lebanese Arab Struggle Movement حركة النضال العربي اللبناني
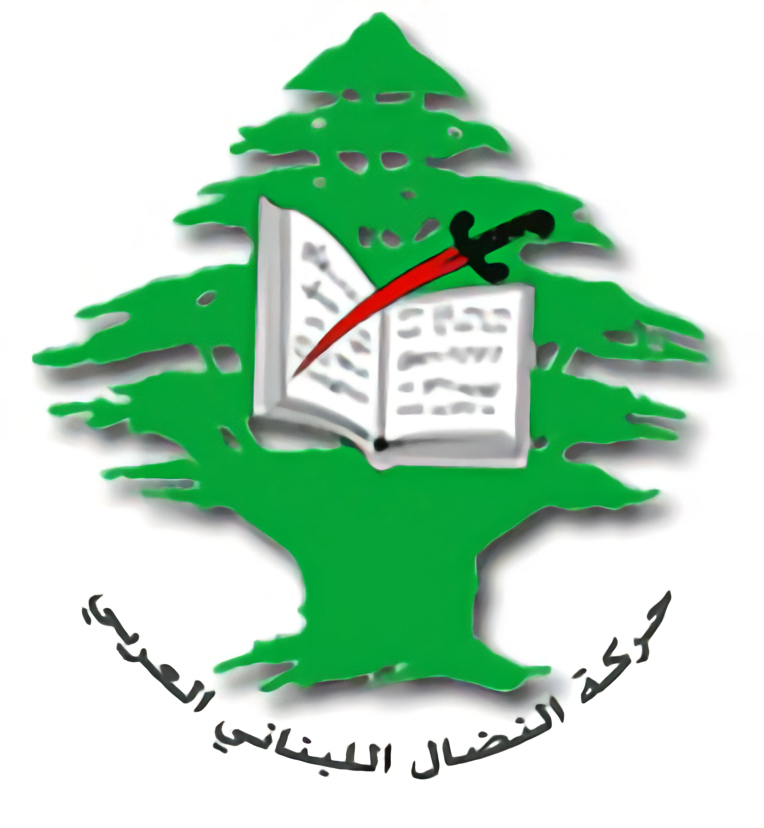
- Abbreviation: LASM
- Secretary-General: Mosleh Daoud
- Headquarters: Beirut
- Ideology: Pan-Arabism; Arab Nationalism; Pro-Syrianism
- National affiliation: March 8 Alliance
- Slogan: "One Arab Nation With An Eternal Mission"

The Lebanese Arab Struggle Movement – LASM (Arabic: حركة النضال العربي اللبناني| Harakat al-Nidal al-Arabi al-Lubnani) is a political party in Lebanon. Faisal Dawood, former Member of Parliament, is the current general secretary of the party.

The LASM was supportive of the Assad government in Syria and possesses a strong Arab identity.

== See also ==
- Cedar Revolution
- March 8 Alliance
- March 14 Alliance
- Lebanese Civil War
