= Union Party (Lebanon) =

Lebanese political party

Union Party حزب الإتحاد
- Abbreviation: UP
- Leader: Abdul Rahim Mrad
- Founded: 1960s
- Headquarters: West Beqaa
- Ideology: Nasserism; Pan-Arabism
- National affiliation: March 8 Alliance
- Parliament of Lebanon: 1 / 128
- Cabinet of Lebanon: 0 / 30

Party flag

The Union Party (Arabic: حزب الإتحاد Hizb el ittihad) is a Lebanese political party based in Beqaa Governorate and led by former minister Abdelrahim Mourad. The party is officially secular and its ideology is Nasserism. The party was founded as Resurrect the Revolution (Arabic: بعث الثورة), and took on its current name in 1990.

The party is strongly allied with Syria and the March 8 Alliance with support from Iran, Syria and previously Qatar.

The Union Party was represented in Parliament by Abdelrahim Mourad from 1992 to 2009, and from 2018 to 2022 in one of the Sunni seats in West Bekaa-Rashaya. He was succeeded as an MP by his son Hasan Mrad following the 2022 Lebanese general election.
