= Samir Kassir =

Lebanese journalist (1960-2005)

- Born: 5 May 1960; Achrafieh, Beirut, Lebanon
- Died: 2 June 2005 (aged 45); Achrafieh, Beirut
- Cause of death: Assassination
- Education: Paris-Sorbonne University; Pantheon-Sorbonne University
- Occupations: Professor, journalist, activist, historian,
- Years active: 1977–2005
- Political party: Democratic Left Movement
- Spouse: Giselle Khoury
- Children: 2
- Website: www.samirkassirfoundation.org

Samir Kassir (Arabic: سمير قصير, romanized: Samīr Qaṣṣīr; 5 May 1960 – 2 June 2005) was a Lebanese-Syrian-Palestinian journalist of An-Nahar and professor of history at Saint-Joseph University, who was an advocate of democracy and prominent opponent of the Syrian occupation of Lebanon. He was assassinated in 2005 as part of a series of assassinations of anti-Syria Lebanese political figures such as Rafic Hariri and George Hawi.

== Early life and education ==
Samir Kassir was born on 5 May 1960. His father was a Palestinian-Lebanese and his mother Syrian-Lebanese. He hailed from an Antiochian Greek Orthodox family.

Kassir received his degree in political philosophy in 1984. He gained a DEA (roughly equivalent to a Master's degree in the British university system) in philosophy and political philosophy from Pantheon-Sorbonne University in the same year. He obtained his PhD in modern and contemporary history from Paris-Sorbonne University in 1990, with a thesis on the Lebanese Civil War.

== Journalism ==
Kassir's journalistic career began when he was a seventeen-year-old secondary school student at the Lycée Français de Beyrouth with unsigned contributions to the Lebanese Communist Party newspaper Al Nidā. The same year, he began contributing to the French-language daily L'Orient-Le Jour that took a strong stance against Syria and Hezbollah. From 1981 to 2000, he contributed to the French international political review Le Monde Diplomatique. In 1982 and 1983 he edited the newsletter Le Liban en Lutte (Struggling Lebanon), which was dedicated to the Lebanese resistance against the Israeli occupation. From 1984 to 1985 he edited the weekly Al-Yawm as-Sābi', and from 1986 to 2004 he was a member of the editorial board of the Revue des Etudes Palestiniennes, the French-language journal of the Institute for Palestine Studies. From 1988 to 1989 he contributed to the London-based pan-Arab daily Al-Hayat.

In 1995 he founded a new monthly political and cultural review, L'Orient L'Express, which he edited until it ceased publication in 1998, from lack of interest and pressure from the advertising industry. From that year on he was a professor at the "Institut des sciences politiques de l'Université Saint-Joseph" in Beirut. It was also in 1998 that Kassir became an editorial writer for the daily Al-Nahar newspaper. He became widely known for his popular weekly column in which he wrote strong articles against the pro-Syrian government. He also made frequent appearances on several television stations as a political analyst on news programmes.

== Assassination and funeral ==
Kassir was assassinated using a car bomb in Beirut on 2 June 2005, just a few days after the general elections. The investigation into his assassination directs to Unit 121 Of Hezbollah as part of its policy to eliminate political and journalist threat of those who oppose them and the Syrian government's influence in Lebanon.

On 4 June, a funeral ceremony was performed for him in Beirut with the attendance of hundreds.

=== Aftermath ===
There was widespread condemnation for the killing and many prominent opposition figures blaming the blast on the Lebanese and Syrian governments. Among them were Hariri's son, Saad Hariri, who said "the blood-stained hands that assassinated Rafiq Hariri are the same ones that assassinated Samir Kassir." Moreover, Elias Atallah, Secretary General of the Democratic Left Movement, urged his allies to the presidential palace and remove president Lahoud. However, the calls remained unanswered. Years later, 14 March allies admitted that had Lahoud been removed, Lebanon would have been spared the later political assassinations.

Kassir was among the first victims in the growing list of political assassinations that occurred in Lebanon from 2004 to 2008. These began with the attempted assassination of Marwan Hamadeh and followed with the killing of Rafik Hariri in 2005. After Kassir, George Hawi, the former head of the Lebanese Communist Party was targeted by another car-bomb; this was followed by failed assassination attempts at former Interior Minister and former Syrian ally Elias Murr and popular LBCI TV anchorwoman and journalist May Chidiac who survived, but lost an arm and leg. On 12 December 2005, Samir Kassir's colleague, An Nahar's chief editor, and top anti-Syria legislator Gebran Tueni, was killed by a car bomb. Pierre Amine Gemayel, the former Minister of Industry, was another victim in the series of assassinations. MP Walid Eido from the Hariri-led Future movement was killed near the Military Bath of Beirut on 13 June 2007. Shortly afterwards, MP Antoine Ghanem of the Lebanese Phalanges Party (aka Kataeb Party), was killed in another car bomb on 19 September 2007 in the Sin al-Fil suburb of Beirut. Then, second-in-command of the Lebanese Armed Forces, General François al-Hajj was killed in the military-secured suburb of Baabda on 12 December 2007. One month later, security chief and top Lebanese investigator into the International Tribunal for the Hariri assassination was killed in January 2008. Many have blamed Syria for all the recent assassinations of its opponents.

== Views ==
A prominent left-wing activist, Kassir was a strong advocate of freedom for the Palestinians, democracy in Lebanon and Syria and a vocal critic of the Syrian presence in Lebanon. He was a keen advocate of secular democracy in the Middle East.

" ... What [Arab-American] reconciliation needs, if the United States were really willing to reach such reconciliation, is first [America's] revision of its understanding of Arab democracy, which has been restricted until now, to the American convention that mandates Arabs give up their pan-Arab ties... and the issues that steer their feelings most, on top of them the Palestinian issue ..."

Kassir was unafraid of expressing trenchant opinions. He continuously spoke for the rights of the Palestinians. He recognised courage and determination in others and took under his wing leading young pro-democracy and human rights activists such as Wissam Tarif, with whom Kassir developed a close friendship. It was his non-compromising views on the Ba'ath government that many believe led to his assassination.

He maintained a keen and sympathetic interest in Syria despite his criticism of its involvement in Lebanon, and was on close terms with many Syrian intellectuals, including those involved in the Damascus Spring. He was a founding member of the Democratic Left Movement, which won a seat in the Lebanese parliamentary elections of 2005. Kassir and the party he helped establish were both very influential in triggering the popular upheavals following Prime Minister Rafik Hariri's killing.

== Works ==
Kassir's books, in French and Arabic, include a history of Beirut and a study of the Lebanese Civil War. He also co-authored a book about the Palestinian-Israeli conflict and Palestinian-French relations. His last book in Arabic concerned with the "Damascus Spring" and the consequences for Lebanon of Syrian political developments; Syrian dissident film-maker Omar Amiralay penned its introduction. Before his assassination, he was working on another book about the "Beirut Spring" that aimed to discuss the recent momentous developments in Lebanon, that was supposed to be published by Actes Sud. In February 2006, a book was published with the same title, by Actes Sud, but contained translations of Arabic articles written mainly after Hariri's assassination.

- Itinéraires de Paris à Jérusalem. La France et le conflit israélo-arabe, 2 volumes, Paris, Revue des études palestiniennes, 1992 et 1993 (with Farouk Mardam-Bey).
- La guerre du Liban; De la dissension nationale au conflit régional (1975-1982), Paris, Karthala/Cermoc, 1994.
- Histoire de Beyrouth, Paris, Fayard, 2003. ISBN 2-213-02980-6
- 'Askar 'ala mén? Lubnan al-jumhúriyya al-mafqúda, Beirut, Dár al-Nahár, 2004. (Soldiers against whom? Lebanon, the lost republic).
- Dímúqrátiyyat súria wastiqlál lubnan; al-ba`th 'an rabí' dimashq, Beirut, Dár al-Nahár, 2004. (Syrian democracy and Lebanese independence: in search of the Damascus Spring).
- Considerations sur le malheur arabe, Paris, Actes Sud, 2004. Translated and published by, Dár al-Nahár, in November 2005.
- Liban: Un printemps inachevé, Actes Sud, 2006. Translated from Arabic by Hoda Saliby.
- L'infelicità araba , Giulio Einaudi editore s.p.a. Torino 2006.
- Primavere per una Siria Democratica e un Libano Independente, Mesogea by GEm s.r.l. 2006.
- Das Arabische unglück, Schiler 2006
- De la desgracia de ser árabe, Almuzara 2006
- Being Arab, Verso, London 2006
- Den arabiska olyckan, Ruin, Stockholm 2006
- At være araber, Informations Forlag, Købehavn 2009
- Arap Talihsizliği, İletişim Yayınları, İstanbul 2011

== Personal life ==
Kassir was married to Giselle Khoury (1961–2023), a former talk-show host on Al-Arabiya television, at the time of his death. He had two daughters, Mayssa and Liana, from a previous marriage.

== Legacy ==
His wife, Giselle Khoury, and a group of Kassir's friends, students and colleagues from l'Orient Express, including writer Elias Khoury, created the Samir Kassir Foundation. One of the foundation's objectives would be translating his works into English, Italian, and Norwegian. A special edition of l'Orient Express was published in November 2005 to celebrate its tenth anniversary under the title "The Unfinished Spring" and was dedicated in memory of Kassir. This project was initially Kassir's idea who was working on it before he was assassinated.

A square in downtown Beirut, behind the Annahar building, was named in Kassir's honor. The Kassir Foundation erected a bronze statue of the journalist there on 2 June 2006, exactly a year after his assassination.

The EU Delegation to Lebanon and the Kassir Foundation initiated a journalism prize in 2006, the Samir Kassir Award for Freedom of Press. Dina Abdel Mooti Darwich, an Egyptian journalist, won the first Samir Kassir Prize in 2006.

In 2009, in memory of his death, his wife Giselle founded the annual Beirut Spring Festival.

== See also ==
- List of assassinated Lebanese politicians
- List of extrajudicial killings and political violence in Lebanon

== Notes ==
- Journalist's murder rattles Beirut, Christian Science Monitor, 3 June 2005
- Death in Beirut, New York Sun, 3 June 2005
- Hundreds mourn Beirut journalist, BBC News, 3 June 2005
- Adam Shatz - The principle of hope: Samir Kassir 1960-2005, The Nation, 4 July 2005
- Anti-Syria journalist killed by car bomb, Ramsay Short - The Telegraph, 3 June 2005
- Petition Urges Justice for Samir Kassir, iFEX, 5 July 2005.
