= Democratic Left Movement (Lebanon) =

Nonsectarian and a democratic leftist political party from Beirut

Democratic Left Movement حركة اليسار الديمقراطي
- Abbreviation: DL
- Founder: Numerous (Samir Kassir, Ziad Majed, others)
- Founded: 13 September 2004; 22 years ago
- Split from: Lebanese Communist Party
- Headquarters: Beirut
- Ideology: Arab nationalism Secularism; Social democracy Egalitarianism; Nonsectarianism
- Political position: Centre-left
- National affiliation: March 14 Alliance
- Colors: and
- Parliament of Lebanon: 0 / 128

Website
- https://web.archive.org/web/20080207035656/http://www.alyassar.org/

The Democratic Left Movement (DLM, Arabic: حركة اليسار الديمقراطي Harakat Al-Yassar Al-Dimuqratiy, Arabic acronym HYD) is a nonsectarian and a democratic leftist political party. It was founded in September 2004 by left-wing and center-left intellectuals and activists some of whom had previously split from the Lebanese Communist Party (LCP) while some were student activists from the "Independent Leftist Groups". The DLM affirms a European-style social democracy—but is open to all forms of leftism and encourages the development of a true secular state. The party operates under a decentralized framework that emphasizes diversity of thought for a progressive society in a liberal democratic environment. It participated in the 2005 Cedar Revolution, a wave of demonstrations against the Syrian occupation of Lebanon, and calls for correcting imbalanced relations with Syria.

The DLM won its first parliamentary seat in Lebanon's 2005 elections representing the Tripoli district. On 2 June 2005, amid election rounds, Samir Kassir, a founder of the movement, was assassinated in a car bombing. Less than one month later, George Hawi, a former secretary general of the Lebanese Communist Party and an ally of the DLM, was killed in a similar car bombing in Beirut. In the 2009 elections, the party again won a single seat, instead representing the West Bekaa district. It is a member of the March 14 Alliance parliamentary coalition.

== History ==
=== Background and foundation ===
During the late 1990s, there was a growing number of intellectuals (Samir Kassir, Ziad Majed, Elias Khoury) and a network of independent student groups ("Independent Leftist Groups") who advocated democracy, individual liberties, secularism and center-left economic policies in Lebanon. On the other hand, a growing number Lebanese Communist Party (LCP) members were dissatisfied with the status of their party: the rise of Islamic fundamentalism, the dissolution of the Soviet Union, and the failure of the LCP to assume a more democratic socialist platform ushered in an era of political decline for the party. This, coupled with perceived Syrian domination of its leadership, led to increasing frustration among rank-and-file communists against the upper echelons of the party.

On 13 September 2000, a group calling itself "the reform and democracy forces in the Lebanese Communist Party" wrote an open letter demanding the resignation of party leadership. Led by Elias Atallah, (Note: Atallah helped lead the LCP in the 18-year resistance against Israeli forces in Lebanon. See South Lebanon conflict (1982–2000)) the dissidents accused LCP leaders of subservience to Syria and called for full democratization of the party and abandonment of the Stalinist line. Atallah was expelled from the party on 26 September of that year.

These activists who split from the LCP along with the leftist student groups and the intellectuals with no prior affiliation to the LCP, formed the Democratic Left Movement. An initial "temporary preparatory committee" for the movement emerged, which issued statements critical of Syrian intervention in Lebanon and called for the birth of a new left. In September 2004, the Democratic Left Movement was officially established. On 17 October, at a ceremony commemorating its foundation attended by figures across the political spectrum, Elias Atallah declared that the movement was founded on three principles: "[First], we are preachers of real social and cultural change on the basis of democracy, national independence and reconciliation with the Arab nation and Arab nationalism. Second we are preachers of cultural and ideological renaissance for the sake of secularism and political and religious reforms in the Arab east... Thirdly we believe in fighting for freedom and against tyranny and oppression."

Shortly after foundation, the DLM, Qornet Shehwan Gathering, Democratic Renewal, and Democratic Gathering formed a "multi-party opposition" to oppose the constitutional amendment that extended the presidential term of Emile Lahoud. The informal coalition, which sought to defend the constitution and republic, appealed for free elections based on an equitable electoral law, curtailing corruption, fostering an independent judiciary, and reforming public administration. It was divided on the Syrian military presence in the country and on the use of arms to resolve the Shebaa farms dispute. Later, in December 2004 and again in February 2005, the movement was among an agglomeration of opposition parties to gather at Beirut's Le Bristol Hotel Beirut and demand a "total withdrawal" of Syrian troops.

=== Independence Intifada ===
The DLM actively participated in the 2005 Independence Intifada (Cedar Revolution), a so-called colour revolution in which hundreds of thousands rallied against the Syrian occupation of Lebanon and its supporters in the Lebanese government. As the only leftist, nonsectarian element in the demonstrations, the DLM proved important for the opposition's public relations. Following the resignation of pro-Syrian Prime Minister Omar Karami in a wave of demonstrations, DLM leader Elias Atallah is quoted as saying, "Today the government fell. Tomorrow, it's the one huddled in Anjar," in reference to the Syrian chief of intelligence based in that city. The New York Times credited Samir Kassir, a founder of the movement, with orchestrating the protests. On 14 March 2005, Atallah addressed the demonstrators, articulating the need for a free, sovereign, and united Lebanon. The DLM called on the protesters to press on to Baabda Palace, residence of the president, hoping to use the momentum to compel Emile Lahoud to resign. However, resistance by Maronite Patriarch Nasrallah Sfeir prevented this, resulting in a temporary fallout between the DLM and opposition.

The movement remains critical of perceived Syrian interference in Lebanon, citing its participation in the March 14 Alliance parliamentary bloc as "defending Lebanese independence against the Syrian government’s attacks and against Hezbollah and its allies' attempts to impose their views and choices". It lists "attaining full independence of the country" as a political goal.

This poster commemorates Samir Kassir and reads "Martyr of the Independence Uprising; Democratic Left."

=== Kassir and Hawi assassinations ===
On 2 June 2005, Samir Kassir, a founder and leader of the movement, a prominent Lebanese journalist, and an outspoken critic of Syria was assassinated in a car bombing. DLM activists marched to the presidential palace in the Beirut suburb of Baabda to lay a wreath representing guilt for Kassir's death. Elias Atallah, head of the DLM, explained that the wreath would "place the blame at the head of the joint Lebanese-Syrian security regime". Emile Lahoud, then president, condemned the killing and told reporters, "My conscience is clear". After Kassir's death, membership in the DLM surged to a few thousand.

Less than one month later, on 21 June 2005, George Hawi, a former secretary general of the LCP, was killed in a similar car bombing in Beirut. Hawi, an outspoken critic of Syria in recent years, actively campaigned for DLM leader Elias Atallah's candidacy in Lebanon's 2005 Elections. Atallah and other allies of Hawi blamed the bombing on pro-Syrian forces in the Lebanese-security apparatus. In an interview with NOW Lebanon, former DLM Vice President Ziad Majed explained, "Georges Hawi ... was trying to bring the communist party, or at least part of it, to join efforts with us [the DLM]."

In Al Mustaqbal newspaper, Elias Atallah called for broadening the planned inquiries into Rafic Hariri's assassination to include the Kassir and Hawi bombings. He demanded Lahoud's resignation, saying the president was "incapable of protecting leadership figures in Lebanon."

== Structure and composition ==
The DLM operates under a decentralized framework in which internal movements are encouraged and represented in a national body. The party's constituency elects a National Assembly, the principal decision-making body, through proportional representation, where every internal movement forms a list. Composed of 51 to 101 members, determined proportionately by the size of the constituency, it maintains political priorities, alliances, and rhetoric, and elects an executive committee of 9 to 15 members for daily organizational activities. Other organizational bodies include the Legal Committee and Financial Committee, and internal elections occur every three years.

In October 2004, a 77-member constituent assembly elected a 15-member executive committee in the movement's first session of internal elections. Those elected included Elias Atallah as General Secretary (and leader), Nadim Abdel Samad as president, and Hikmat Eid, Anju Rihan, Ziad Majed and Ziad Saab as members. In April 2007, another internal election occurred. Two lists competed, one supported by Atallah and representing the leadership's rhetoric and the other an all-youth movement named Keep Left. While Atallah was reelected, Keep Left attained 30% of votes in Lebanon and 58% of votes abroad in an online poll, enabling the entire list to be elected. Ziad Majed, previously vice president of the DLM, and Elias Khoury, a prominent and founding member, chose not to participate for personal and political reasons.

Headquartered in the Lebanese capital, Beirut, branches are permitted in any region of Lebanon or abroad. Provincial and district associations are largely autonomous. Youth members comprise a substantial portion of the movement; Elias Atallah stated that half of the party's members was 26 or younger.

The General Assembly, which was set for 2010, took place in December 2011, and saw the emergence of a new leadership. Walid Fakhreddin was elected as the new Secretary General and the Executive Bureau was formed mainly from a new generation of leaders. However, this General Assembly was boycotted by many members who refused to have an election only assembly and were insisting on having a General Assembly that discusses the direction the movement should take. Some of the members who boycotted formed a current within the movement, called the Democratic Current in the Democratic Left Movement. The bylaws of the Democratic Left Movement allow for internal currents and factions to operate freely.

== Political stances ==
=== Ideology ===
The DLM backs a Western European-style social democracy to promote equality without hampering personal liberty or economic productivity. In an interview with NOW Lebanon, DLM Former Vice President Ziad Majed classified the movement as center-left economically. However, he went on to say that the party adopted a decentralized model when founded to enable the coexistence of divergent views in which internal movements are encouraged. Its political manifesto identifies the movement as "beyond the requirement of singularity of thought" (Note: Arabic: تتجاوز وحدانية الفكر) and open to leftists of all denominations. This emphasis on pluralism distinguishes the DLM from other leftist groups in Lebanon.

Marxists, socialists, social democrats, all believe in the same basic program – social justice, secularism, a non-police state ... democracy.

— Ziad Majed, in an interview with The Daily Star

=== Domestic policy ===
The DLM is one of a few parties to propose secularization of the Lebanese state. This includes abolishing sectarian appropriation of public jobs, replacing the confessional parliamentary system with a representative system, and permitting the execution of civil marriage on Lebanese soil. The Economist magazine described the party as the "most avowedly secular component" of the March 14 Alliance.

The DLM appeals for administrative reform in the public sector through a decentralization, modernization, and mechanization plan. It defends human rights and calls for the respect of public freedoms and rule of law. Listed within its platform is support for the marginalized and the abandonment of divisive particularism. The movement supports prohibiting the discrimination of the disabled.

=== Foreign policy ===
On foreign policy, the DLM platform is more uniform. The party calls for a diverse, unified, and democratic Arab society. It opposes foreign interference in Lebanese politics and supports correcting imbalanced relations with Syria. In the Shebba farms dispute, the movement advocates resolving the identity of the territory through diplomacy. If the farms are determined Lebanese, the cabinet should authorize their "liberation" either diplomatically or militarily but through state institutions alone to allow the state to fulfill its role there. On the broader Arab-Israeli Conflict, the DLM appeals for the creation of a regional defense strategy which protects Lebanese sovereignty from Israeli aggression while promoting the interests of the region. It opposes American intervention in Iraq and elsewhere while also rejecting authoritarian governments like the Ba'ath. The party advocates democracy in Syria and associates with its democratic opposition, particularly the Syrian Democratic People's Party.

== Electoral results ==
In the legislative elections of May and June 2005, the DLM won one seat to become the first leftist political party in the Lebanese Parliament. Holding the Maronite seat (Note: Each religious community in Lebanon has an allotted number of seats in the Parliament. They do not represent only their co-religionists, however; all candidates in a particular constituency, regardless of religious affiliation, must receive a plurality of the total vote, which includes followers of all confessions, and represent them equally. See Confessionalism (politics)) of Tripoli, Elias Atallah represented the district as part of the March 14 Alliance, a pro-Western political coalition and parliamentary majority. Atallah received 89,890 votes to defeat rival Fayez Wajih Karam by 14,482 votes.

In the 2009 elections, Atallah could not seek reelection because March 14 selected Samer Saadeh, a Kataeb Party candidate, to run on the coalition's list in the Tripoli district. Meanwhile, Amin Wahbi, another DLM candidate, won a Shiite parliamentary seat in West Bekaa on the March 14 coalition's list. Accruing 34,424 votes, 53% of ballots cast, Wehbi unseated incumbent Nasser Nasrallah of the Amal Movement, who obtained 25,457 votes.

The influence of the DLM, however, stems not from its limited electoral successes but from "its articulation of anti-Syrian positions from a left[ist] perspective."
