= Future Movement =

Future Movement تيار المستقبل
- Abbreviation: FM
- Chairperson: Saad Hariri
- General Secretary: Ahmad Hariri
- Founder: Rafic Hariri
- Founded: 1995
- Headquarters: Beirut
- Newspaper: Al-Mustaqbal
- Ideology: Lebanese nationalism Classical liberalism Economic liberalism
- Political position: Centre-right
- Religion: Sunni Islam
- National affiliation: March 14 Alliance
- International affiliation: Liberal International
- Regional affiliation: Arab Liberal Federation
- Colours: Blue
- Parliamentary bloc: Lebanon First
- Parliament of Lebanon: 0 / 128
- Cabinet of Lebanon: 0 / 24

Party flag

Website
- www.almustaqbal.org

The Future Movement (Arabic: تيار المستقبل) is a Lebanese political party affiliated with the Sunni sect. The party was founded as a coalition in 1995 led by Rafic Hariri which was known as the Hariri Bloc but was officially founded in 2007. The party is led by Saad Hariri.

The party is the largest member of the March 14 Alliance, which governed Lebanon from 2005 to 2018 except for the period 2011–2013. The coalition lost its majority in the 2018 parliamentary elections.

In mid-October 2019, a popular protest movement began calling for increased accountability and transparency in politics. On 29 October, Chairman Hariri offered his resignation as a concession, saying "This is in response to the will and demand of the thousands of Lebanese demanding change". He officially stepped down on 19 January 2020.

The party was officially founded in August 2007, yet it was only declared on April 5, 2009, in a convention held at the BIEL convention center in Beirut. The Future Movement is economically liberal and affiliated with the Sunni Muslim sect. The party is a full member of the Liberal International and a founding member of Al Hurriya Liberal Network.

Saad Hariri surprisingly announced his retirement from politics on 24 January 2022. The Future Movement announced it would thereafter not take part in the 2022 Lebanese general election. However on February 14, 2025, Saad Hariri announced the return of the Future Movement, during a speech at Martyr's Square. He pledged that the party would actively participate in upcoming elections and continue to represent Lebanese voices.

== Politics ==
The Future Movement was founded in 2007 and was part of the March 14 Alliance that includes, amongst many groups, the Christians associated with the Lebanese Forces and Kataeb parties (main 2 allies of FM), and the majority Druze Progressive Socialist Party. The main opponent of Future Movement is the March 8 Alliance, most important parts being Free Patriotic Movement (FPM) led by General Michel Aoun and the Shia Hezbollah and Amal Movements.

=== Opposition to Hezbollah ===
In 2011, an official of the Future Movement warned that Shia Hezbollah "has all the characteristics of a terrorist party", and that Hezbollah is moving Lebanon toward the Iranian Shi'ite Islamic system of government.

On 23 June 2013, Future Movement MP Nohad El Machnouk, who was appointed as the minister of interior and municipalities in Prime Minister Tamam Salam's government on 15-2-2014, told Murr TV that Lebanon is under occupation by Hezbollah.

== Media ==
Future TV was a Lebanese owned and operated company founded in 1993. First launched in Lebanon on February 15, 1993, Future Television, although the youngest of the Lebanese stations back then, became the nation's fastest growing station. In September 2019, Lebanese Prime Minister and party leader Saad Hariri announced the suspension of work at his Future TV satellite television channel after 26 years of broadcasting, citing financial reasons for halting operations.

== Future Youth ==
The Future Movement's youth wing, Future Youth, is a member of the International Federation of Liberal Youth (IFLRY).

== Election summary ==
=== 2018 ===
At a ceremony in the Seaside Pavilion on 11 March 2018 the candidates and electoral platform of the Future Movement were presented. The party fielded 37 candidates, out of whom 21 were newcomers. The political newcomers included lawyer Roula Tabash Jaroudi in Beirut II and civil society activist Chadi Nacchabe in Tripoli.

The electoral slogan of the party was 'Blue Talisman' (kharzé zar’a). Commenting on the slogan party leader Saad Hariri stated that "[the] Future Movement is a Talisman (blue bead) that you put in the ballot box, to protect the country. For that reason, our slogan is the protection of Lebanon and the symbol is the Talisman. You will draw the Talisman with your activity, with your energy, with your daily small and large contributions to the electoral machine, in your dialogue with people, in working for each candidate on the Future lists."

The Future Movement and the Lebanese Forces negotiated for weeks on forming an electoral alliance, but the effort failed as relations between Future leader Saad Hariri and LF leader Samir Geagea deteriorated on issues relating to Hariri's visit to Saudi Arabia.

=== 2022 ===
After Hariri's boycott, many Sunnis in North II and Akkar chose to follow boycott as well, after which his resignation created a large vacuum in Sunni politics.

Many Ex-Future politicians headed their own blocs, such as Bahaa Hariri and Fouad Sinora, and managed to secure 7 seats of the candidates that were affiliated with the Future Movement in parliament.

Though Mohammad Kabbara has been affiliated with Hariri for years, his son Abdelkarim Kabbara opted to go onboard the Mikati-Backed list as an independent unrelated to the Future Movement.

Election year	# of overall votes	% of overall vote	# of overall seats won	+/–	Bloc Leader
1992 (as Hariri Bloc)			3 / 128	New	Rafic Hariri
1996 (as Hariri Bloc)			25 / 128	▲22	Rafic Hariri
2000 (as Hariri Bloc)			26 / 128	▲1	Rafic Hariri
2005		28.12% (#1)	36 / 128	▲10	Fouad Siniora
2009			33 / 128	▼3	Saad Hariri
2018	256,454 (#3)	14.58%	20 / 128	▼13	Saad Hariri
2022 (as 'National Moderation Bloc')	56,671 (#6)	3.68%	7 / 128	▼13	Various
