= 2009 Lebanese general election =

- 7 June 2009

All 128 seats in the Parliament of Lebanon
- Turnout: 55.2% ▲8.7%
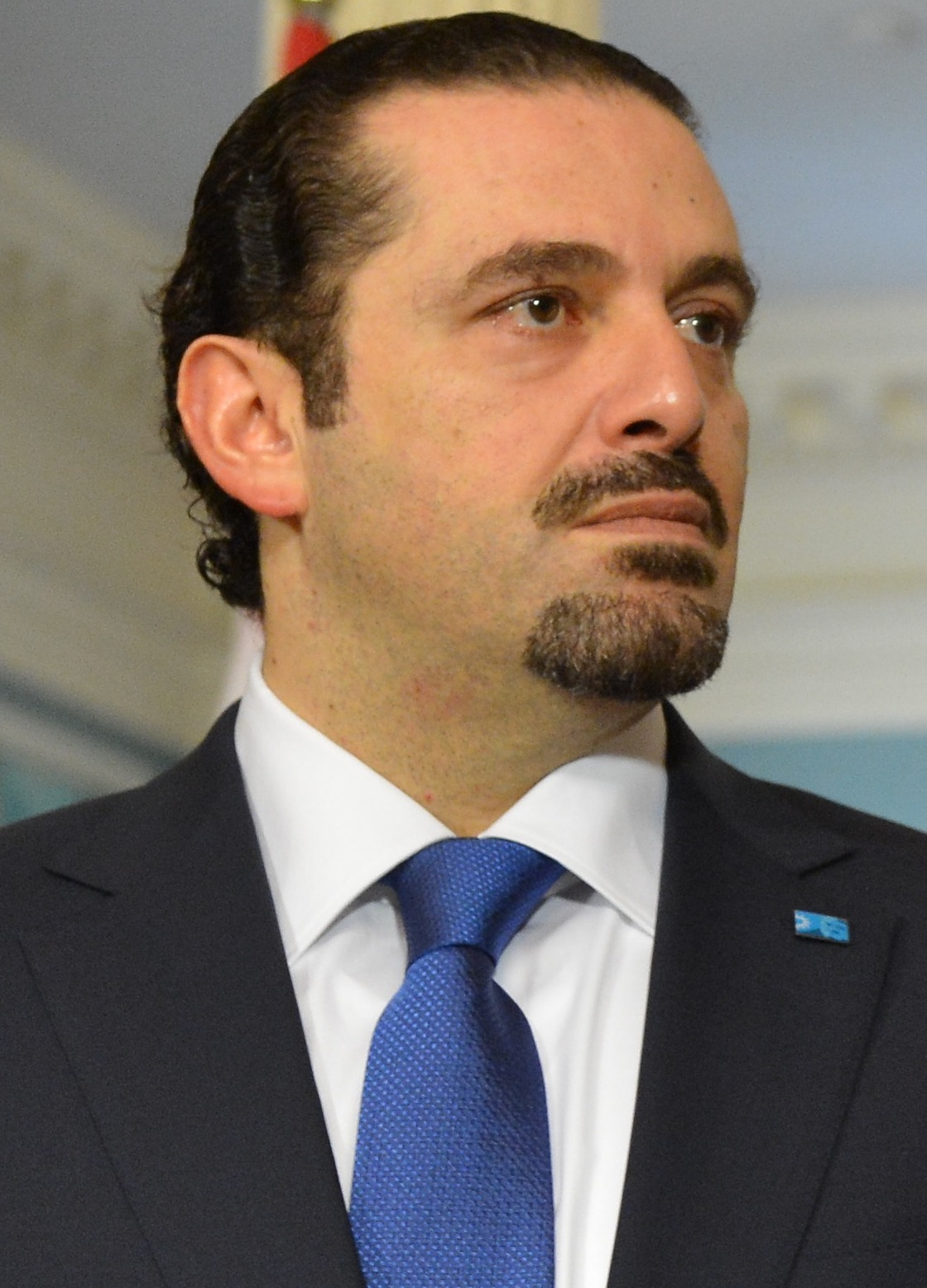

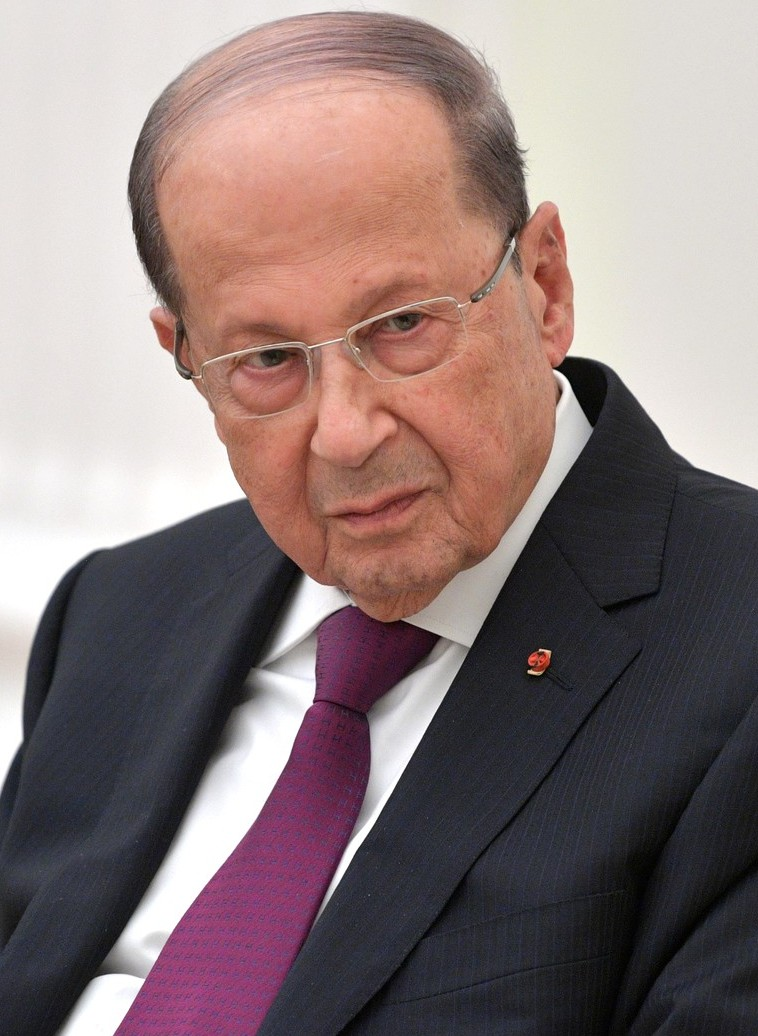

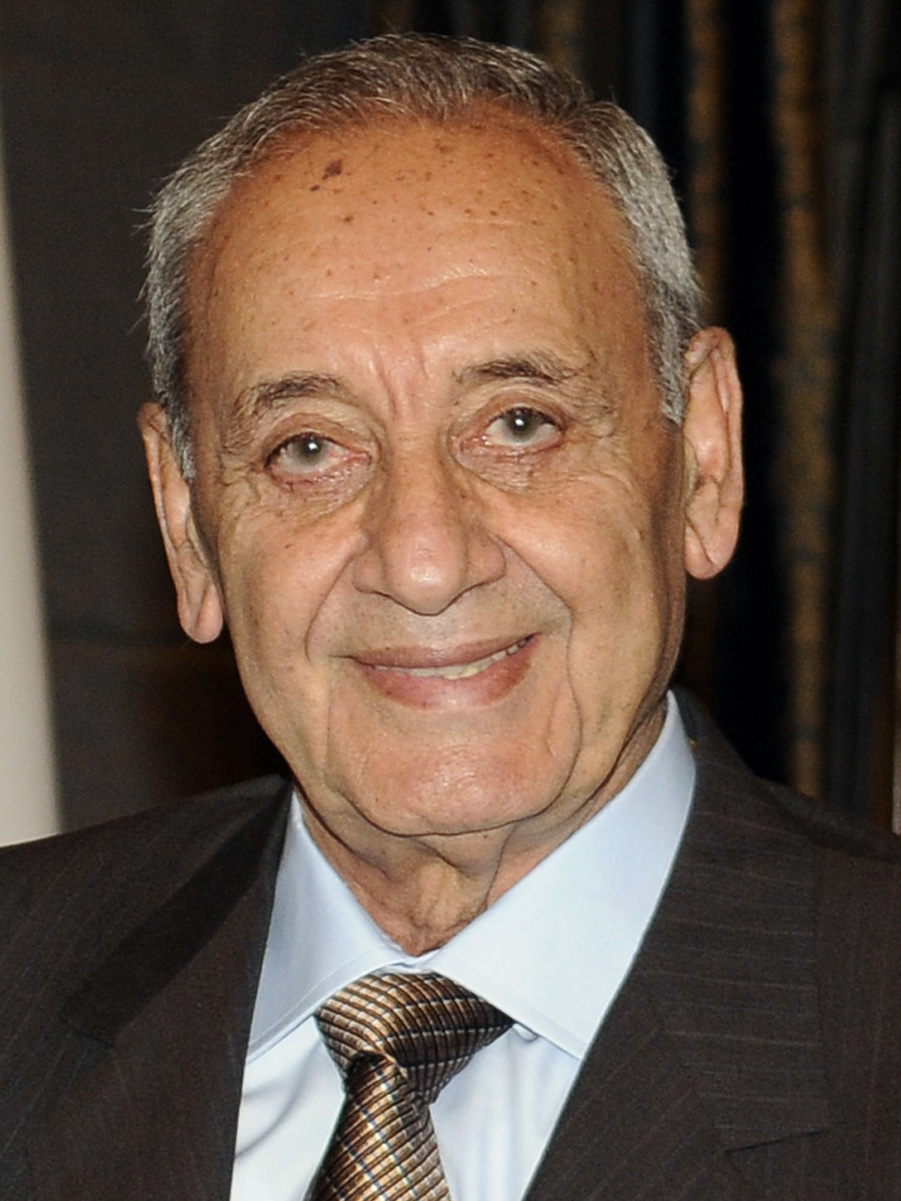

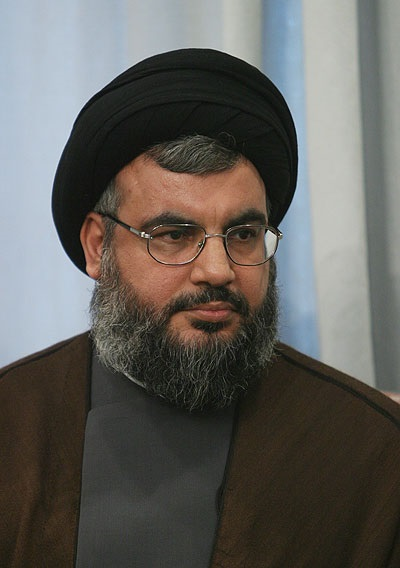

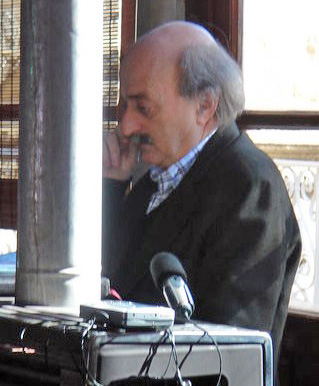

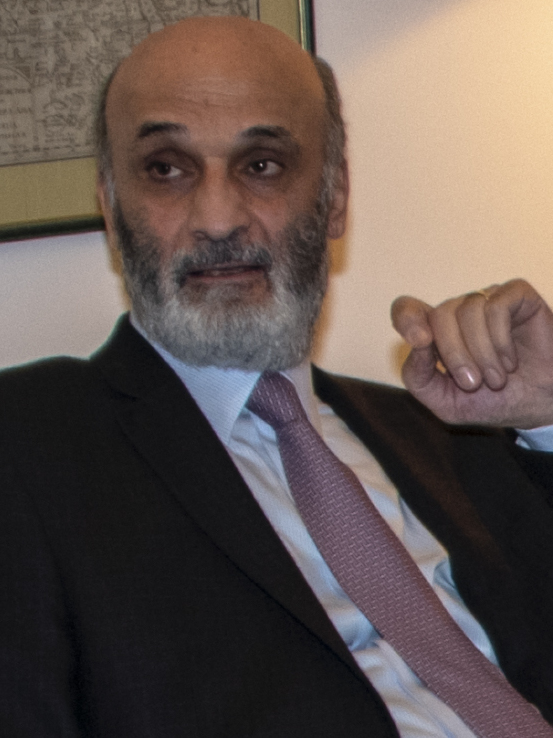

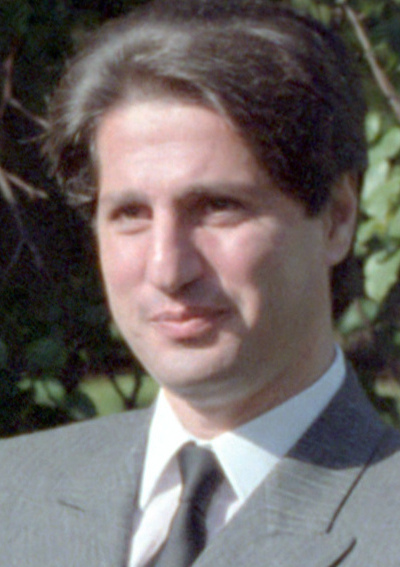

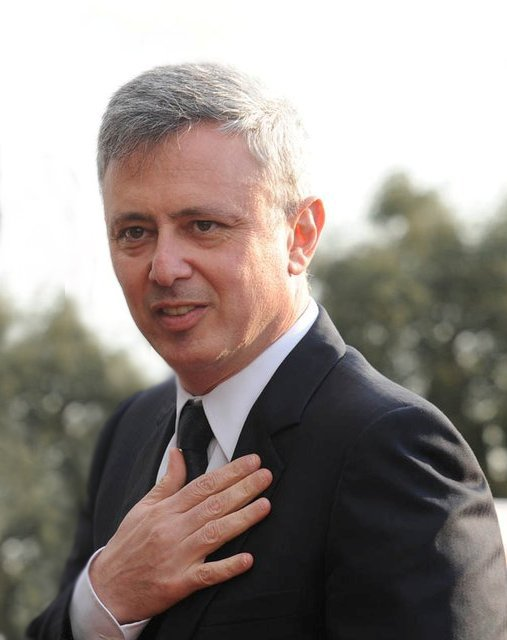
	First party	Second party	Third party
Leader	Saad Hariri	Michel Aoun	Nabih Berri
Party	Future Movement	FPM	Amal Movement
Alliance	March 14	March 8	March 8
Leader's seat	Beirut III	Keserwan	Zahrani
Last election	36 seats	15 seats	14 seats
Seats won	33	19	14
Seat change	▼3	▲4	0
	Fourth party	Fifth party	Sixth party
Leader	Hassan Nasrallah	Walid Jumblatt	Samir Geagea
Party	Hezbollah	PSP	Lebanese Forces
Alliance	March 8	None	March 14
Leader's seat	None	Chouf	None
Last election	14 seats	16 seats	6 seats
Seats won	13	11	8
Seat change	▼1	▼5	▲2
	Seventh party	Eighth party	Ninth party
Leader	Amine Gemayel	Sleiman Frangieh	Hagop Pakradounian
Party	Kataeb	Marada Movement	Tashnag
Alliance	March 14	March 8	March 8
Leader's seat	None	Zgharta	Metn
Last election	3 seats	0 seats	2 seats
Seats won	5	3	2
Seat change	▲2	▲3	0
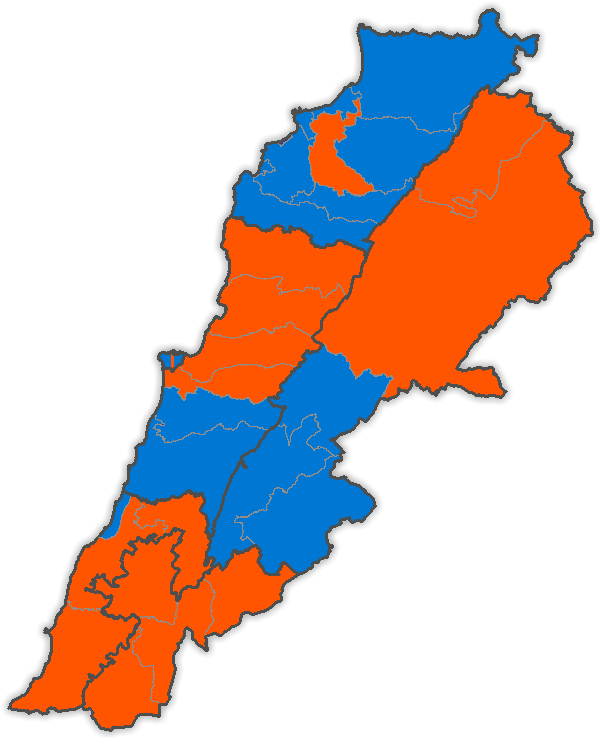
- Areas with a March 14 majority in blue, areas with a March 8 majority in orange
Prime Minister before election
Fouad Siniora
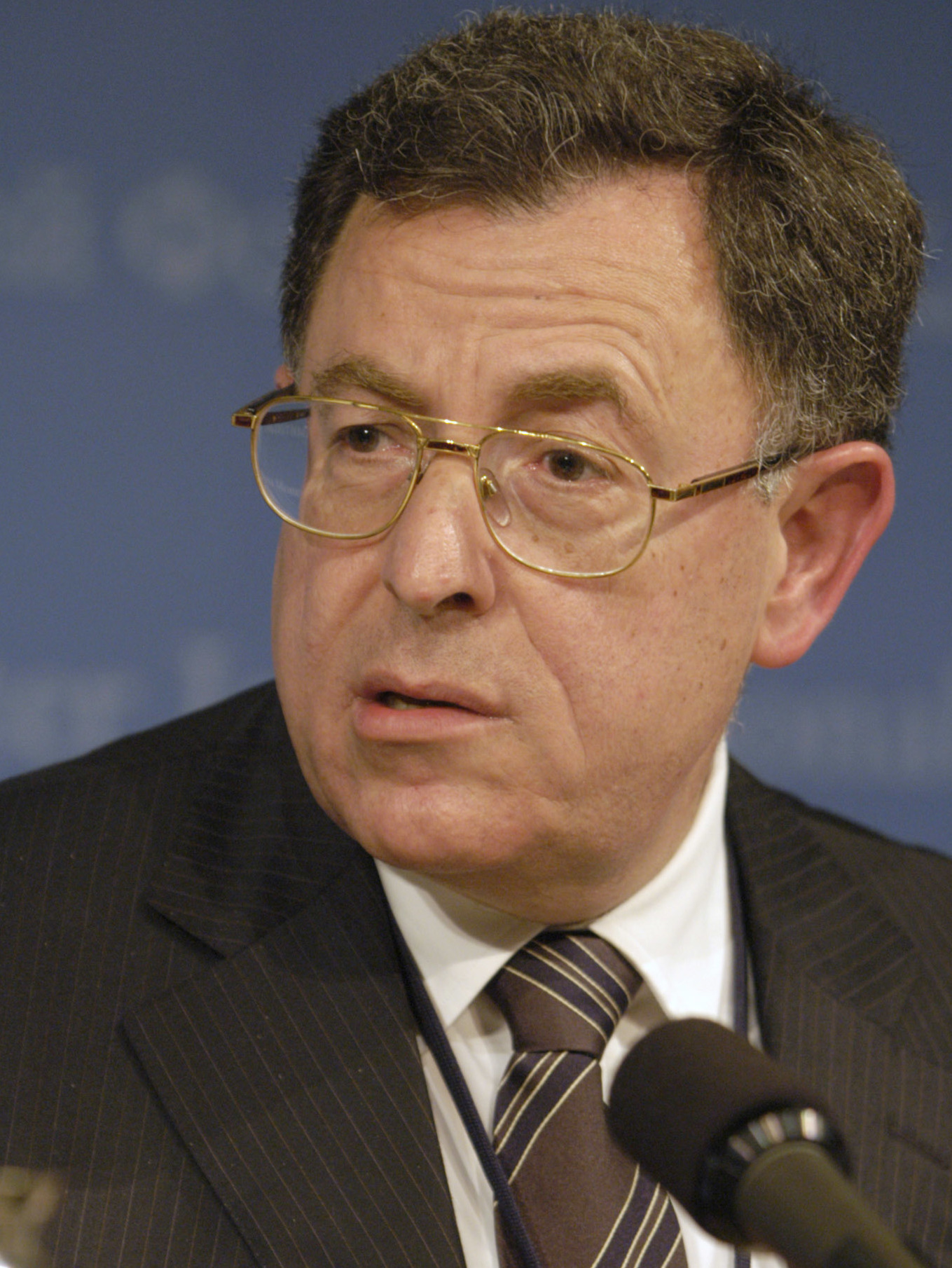
March 14
Elected Prime Minister
Saad Hariri
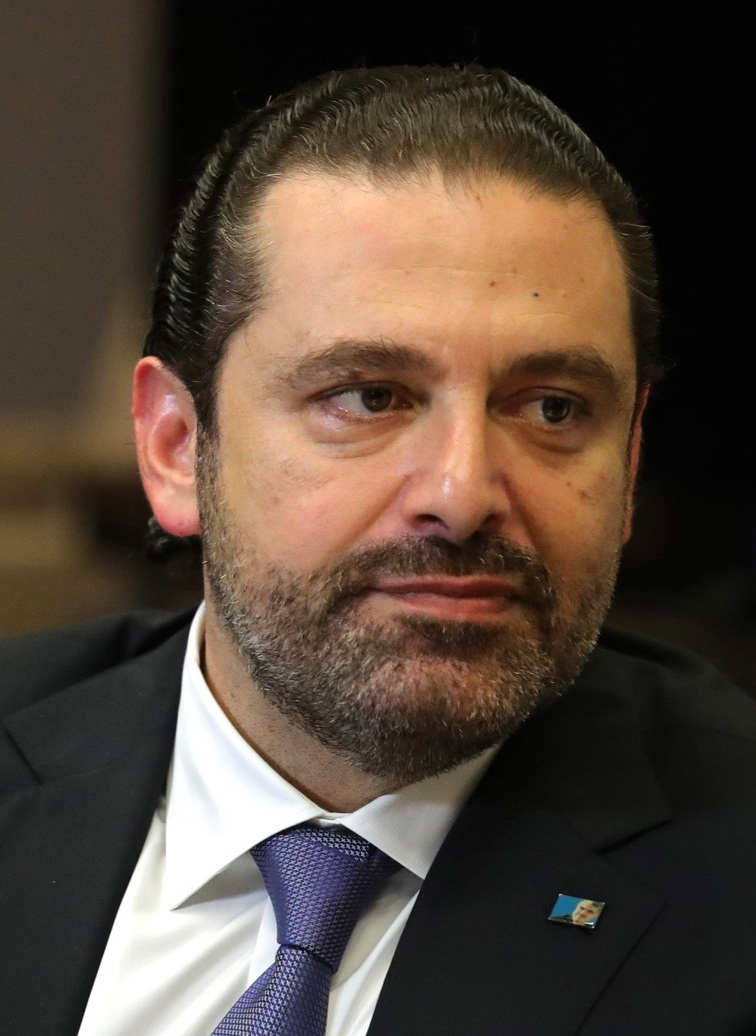
March 14

Parliamentary elections were held in Lebanon on 7 June 2009 to elect all 128 members of the Parliament of Lebanon. Although general elections are held every four years, this parliament due to various reasons stayed in power until the 2018 general election.

== Background ==
The 2009 election was the first general election in Lebanon to be done in one day. Usually, the election used to be divided into four rounds across four weeks, with each round being held in different regions across Lebanon. Before the election, the voting age was to be lowered from 21 to 18 years, but as this requires a constitutional amendment, it did not happen before the election.

== Allocation of seats ==
Following a compromise reached in the Doha Agreement in May 2008 between the government and opposition, a new electoral law was put in place, as shown in the table below. It was passed on 29 September 2008.

Seat allocation according to The Doha Agreement		Seats	Maronite	Shia	Sunni	Greek Orthodox	Druze	Armenian Orthodox	Greek Catholic	Alawite	Evangelical	Minorities	14 March	8 March
Beirut; 19	Beirut 1	5	1	-	-	1	-	1	1	-	-	1	5	0
Beirut; 19	Beirut 2	4	-	1	1	-	-	2	-	-	-	-	2	2
Beirut; 19	Beirut 3	10	-	1	5	1	1	-	-	-	1	1	10	0
Bekaa 23	Baalbek +Hermel	10	1	6	2	-	-	-	1	-	-	-	0	10
Bekaa 23	Zahleh	7	1	1	1	1	-	1	2	-	-	-	7	0
Bekaa 23	Rashaya +West Bekaa	6	1	1	2	1	1	-	-	-	-	-	6	0
Mount Lebanon 35	Jbeil	3	2	1	-	-	-	-	-	-	-	-	0	3
Mount Lebanon 35	Kisrawan	5	5	-	-	-	-	-	-	-	-	-	0	5
Mount Lebanon 35	North Metn	8	4	-	-	2	-	1	1	-	-	-	2	6
Mount Lebanon 35	Baabda	6	3	2	-	-	1	-	-	-	-	-	0	6
Mount Lebanon 35	Aley	5	2	-	-	1	2	-	-	-	-	-	4	1
Mount Lebanon 35	Chouf	8	3	-	2	-	2	-	1	-	-	-	8	0
North Lebanon 28	Akkar	7	1	-	3	2	-	-	-	1	-	-	7	0
North Lebanon 28	Dinniyeh +Minieh	3	-	-	3	-	-	-	-	-	-	-	3	0
North Lebanon 28	Bsharreh	2	2	-	-	-	-	-	-	-	-	-	2	0
North Lebanon 28	Tripoli	8	1	-	5	1	-	-	-	1	-	-	8	0
North Lebanon 28	Zgharta	3	3	-	-	-	-	-	-	-	-	-	0	3
North Lebanon 28	Koura	3	-	-	-	3	-	-	-	-	-	-	3	0
North Lebanon 28	Batroun	2	2	-	-	-	-	-	-	-	-	-	2	0
South Lebanon 23	Saida	2	-	-	2	-	-	-	-	-	-	-	2	0
South Lebanon 23	Tyre	4	-	4	-	-	-	-	-	-	-	-	0	4
South Lebanon 23	Zahrani	3	-	2	-	-	-	-	1	-	-	-	0	3
South Lebanon 23	Hasbaya +Marjeyoun	5	-	2	1	1	1	-	-	-	-	-	0	5
South Lebanon 23	Nabatiyeh	3	-	3	-	-	-	-	-	-	-	-	0	3
South Lebanon 23	Bint Jbeil	3	-	3	-	-	-	-	-	-	-	-	0	3
South Lebanon 23	Jezzine	3	2	-	-	-	-	-	1	-	-	-	0	3
Total 128		128	34	27	27	14	8	5	8	2	1	2	71	57

== Results ==
Logo of the Lebanese general election, 2009

Preliminary results indicated that the turnout had been as high as 55%. The March 14 Alliance garnered 71 seats in the 128-member parliament, while the March 8 Alliance won 57 seats. This result is virtually the same as the result from the election in 2005. However, the March 14 alliance saw this as a moral victory over Hezbollah, who led the March 8 Alliance, and the balance of power was expected to shift in its favor. Many observers expect to see the emergence of a National Unity Government similar to that created following the Doha Agreement in 2008.

Election Results for each alliance		Total	% 14M	14 March	% 8M	8 March
Beirut; 19	Beirut 1	5	52.1%	5	47.9%	0
Beirut; 19	Beirut 2	4	50.5%	2	49.5%	2
Beirut; 19	Beirut 3	10	69.6%	10	31.4%	0
Bekaa 23	Baalbek +Hermel	10	21.6%	0	78.4%	10
Bekaa 23	Zahleh	7	52.7%	7	47.3%	0
Bekaa 23	Rashaya +West Bekaa	6	53.3%	6	46.7%	0
Mount Lebanon 35	Jbeil	3	28.6%	0	71.4%	3
Mount Lebanon 35	Kisrawan	5	30.9%	0	69.1%	5
Mount Lebanon 35	North Metn	8	42.4%	2	58.6%	6
Mount Lebanon 35	Baabda	6	41.8%	0	58.2%	6
Mount Lebanon 35	Aley	5	60.2%	4	39.8%	1
Mount Lebanon 35	Chouf	8	69.6%	8	30.4%	0
North Lebanon 28	Akkar	7	61.1%	7	38.9%	0
North Lebanon 28	Dinniyeh +Minnieh	3	70.9%	3	29.1%	0
North Lebanon 28	Bsharreh	2	71.4%	2	28.6%	0
North Lebanon 28	Tripoli	8	63.5%	8	36.5%	0
North Lebanon 28	Zgharta	3	44.2%	0	55.8%	3
North Lebanon 28	Koura	3	51.1%	3	48.9%	0
North Lebanon 28	Batroun	2	50.2%	2	49.8%	0
South Lebanon 23	Saida	2	63.9%	2	36.1%	0
South Lebanon 23	Tyre	4	06.8%	0	93.2%	4
South Lebanon 23	Zahrani	3	10.0%	0	90.0%	3
South Lebanon 23	Hasbaya +Marjeyoun	5	21.4%	0	78.6%	5
South Lebanon 23	Nabatiyeh	3	11.6%	0	88.4%	3
South Lebanon 23	Bint Jbeil	3	05.8%	0	94.2%	3
South Lebanon 23	Jezzine	3	25.5%	0	74.5%	3
Total 128		128	55.5%	71	44.5%	57

== Formation of government ==
As is typical of Lebanese politics political wrangling after the elections took 5 months. Only in November was the composition of the new cabinet agreed upon: 15 seats for the March 14 Alliance, 10 for the March 8 Alliance, and 5 nominated by Lebanese President Michel Suleiman, who has cast himself as a neutral party between the two main political blocs.

== Aftermath ==
The government fell in January 2011 after the March 8 alliance's 11 ministers withdrew from the government over PM Hariri's refusal to convene a cabinet meeting to discuss possible indictments to be issued by the Special Tribunal for Lebanon.

The March 8 alliance formed a new government in the ensuing six months, at which point the seats in parliament were divided as follows.

Lebanese Parliament as of June 2011
Alliances	Seats	Parties	Seats
Government; 68	27	Change and Reform bloc	
Government; 68	27	Free Patriotic Movement (Tayyar Al-Watani Al-Horr)	19
Government; 68	27	Lebanese Democratic Party (Hizb al-democraty al-lubnany)	2
Government; 68	27	Marada Movement	3
Government; 68	27	Armenian Revolutionary Federation (Tashnag)	2
Government; 68	27	Solidarity Party (Hizb Al-Tadamon Al-Lubnany)	1
Government; 68	30	March 8 Alliance	
Government; 68	30	Amal Movement (Harakat Amal)	13
Government; 68	30	Loyalty to the Resistance (Hezbollah)	13
Government; 68	30	Syrian Social Nationalist Party (al-Hizb al-Qawmi al-souri al ijtima'i)	2
Government; 68	30	Arab Socialist Ba'ath Party	2
Government; 68	11	Pro-Government Independents	
Government; 68	11	Progressive Socialist Party	7
Government; 68	11	Glory Movement	2
Government; 68	11	Safadi Bloc	2
Opposition; 60	60	March 14 Alliance	
Opposition; 60	60	Future Movement (Tayyar Al Mustaqbal)	29
Opposition; 60	60	Lebanese Forces (al-Quwāt al-Lubnāniyya)	8
Opposition; 60	60	Kataeb Party (Hizb al-Kataeb)	5
Opposition; 60	60	Murr Bloc	2
Opposition; 60	60	Social Democrat Hunchakian Party (Social Democrat Hunchakian Party)	2
Opposition; 60	60	Islamic Group (Jamaa al-Islamiya)	1
Opposition; 60	60	Armenian Democratic Liberal Party (Ramgavar Party)	1
Opposition; 60	60	Democratic Left Movement (ĥarakatu-l-yasāri-d-dimuqrātī)	1
Opposition; 60	60	National Liberal Party (Hizbu-l-waTaniyyīni-l-aHrār)	1
Opposition; 60	60	Independents (including ex-PSP)	10
–	–	Total	128
