= List of political parties in Lebanon =

Lebanon has hundreds of registered political parties. After 2005, when the assassination of former Prime Minister Rafic Hariri precipitated the Cedar Revolution, the political landscape became polarized between two rival alliances, the March 8 Alliance and the March 14 Alliance. Both names refer to dates of mass demonstrations during the revolution.

The March 8 Alliance was supportive of continued Syrian intervention in Lebanon, and includes Hezbollah, the Amal Movement (both majority Shia), and the Free Patriotic Movement (majority Christian). The March 14 Alliance contained parties who advocated for the end of Syrian involvement. Major partners include the Future Movement (majority Sunni), the Lebanese Forces, and Ketaeb (both majority Christian). This alliance dissolved in 2016, and the Future Movement withdrew from the 2022 election, but the remaining partners have maintained their opposition to Hezbollah.

The Progressive Socialist Party, the main representative of the Druze community, has supported both blocs at different points.

After the Revolution of 17 October 2019, a series of large-scale protests against the country's economic situation and political elites, a third bloc has emerged, of non-sectarian groups advocating for wide-scale reform. These groups first gained parliamentary representation in the 2022 elections.

The following list places political parties within the two major alliances. Although most parties maintain that they are secular, the major political parties in Lebanon are loosely representative of a certain faith community.

== Parties currently represented in parliament ==
Party	Abbr.	Leader or Chairman	MPs	Political position & ideology	Alliance	Primary demographic
Lebanese Forces القوات اللبنانية al-Quwwāt al-Lubnānīyah	LF	Samir Geagea	19 / 128	Christian democracy Liberal conservatism Lebanese nationalism	Opposition	Christian
Hezbollah حزب الله; Ḥizbu 'llāh	Hezb حزب	Naim Qassem	15 / 128	Shia Islamism; Anti-Zionism; Anti-Western	March 8	Shiite
Amal Movement حركة أمل; Ḥarakat Amal	Amal أمل	Nabih Berri	15 / 128	Conservatism; Populism	March 8	Shiite
Free Patriotic Movement التيار الحرّ at-Tayyār al-Horr	FPM	Gebran Bassil	13 / 128	Civic nationalism Christian democracy Economic liberalism	March 8	Christian
Progressive Socialist Party الحزب التقدمي الإشتراكي; Ḥizb at-Taqadummi al-Ishtiraki	PSP	Taymur Jumblatt	8 / 128	Progressivism; Democratic socialism Secularism; Arab nationalism	Opposition	Druze
Kataeb Party (Phalanges) حزب الكتائب اللبنانية; Ḥizb al-Katā'ib al-Lubnānīya	Kataeb	Samy Gemayel	5 / 128	Lebanese nationalism Christian democracy Social conservatism Maronite politics	Opposition	Maronite
Armenian Revolutionary Federation; Հայ Յեղափոխական Դաշնակցութիւն; Hay Heghapokhagan Tashnagtsutiun	ARF; ՀՅԴ	Hagop Pakradounian	3 / 128	Democratic socialism Armenian nationalism United Armenia	March 8	Armenian
Marada Movement تيار المردة; Tayyār al-Marada	MM	Suleiman Frangieh	2 / 128	Christian democracy Lebanese nationalism Pro-Syrianism	March 8	Maronite
Independence Movement حركة الاستقلال; Harakat al-Istiklal	IM	Michel Moawad	2 / 128	Lebanese nationalism	Opposition	Maronite
Taqaddom Party حزب التقدم; Ḥizb al-TaKadum		Collective leadership	2 / 128	Reformism; Social democracy	October 17	Secular
Islamic Charitable Projects Association جمعية المشاريع الخيرية الإسلامية; Jamʿīyah al-Mashārīʿ al-Khayrīyah al-ʾIslāmīyah	ICPA الأحباش al-Aḥbāsh	Shaykh Hussam Qaraqira	2 / 128	Religious pluralism Islamic neo-traditionalism Anti-Salafism	March 8	Sunni
Islamic Group الجماعة الإسلامية al-Jama'ah al-Islamiyah	IG	Azzam Al-Ayyoubi	1 / 128	Islamic democracy Pan-Islamism	Opposition	Sunni
Union Party حزب الإتحاد; Ḥizb al-Ittiḥād	UP	Abdul Rahim Mrad	1 / 128	Nasserism	March 8	Sunni
National Banner Party حزب الراية الوطني; Ḥizb al-Rayyat al-Watani	NBP	Ali Hijazi	1 / 128	Arab nationalism	March 8	Secular
National Liberal Party حزب الوطنيين الأحرار; Ḥizb al-Waṭaniyyīn al-Aḥrār	NLP	Camille Dory Chamoun	1 / 128	Economic liberalism Lebanese nationalism National liberalism	Opposition	Maronite
Lana – Social Democratic Party لـنا - حزب ديمقراطي اجتماعي; Lana - hizb dimuqratiun ajtimaeiun	Lana	Hassan Sinno	1 / 128	Reformism; Social democracy	October 17	Secular
Mada Party حزب مادا hizb mada	Mada	Karim Saadeh	1 / 128	Reformism; Social democracy	October 17	Secular
Khatt Ahmar الخط الأحمر alkhatu al'ahmar		Waddah Sadek	1 / 128	Reformism; Social democracy	October 17	Secular
Popular Nasserist Organization التنظيم الشعبي الناصري at-Tanzim ash-Shaabi an-Nassiri	PNO	Ossama Saad	1 / 128	Nasserism; Socialism; Arab nationalism	None	Sunni
National Dialogue Party حزب الحوار الوطني; Ḥizb al-Hiwar al-Watani	NDP	Fouad Makhzoumi	1 / 128	Economic liberalism Secular liberalism	None	Sunni
Dignity Movement تيار الكرامة; Tayyār al-Karāma	DM	Faisal Karami	1 / 128	Arab nationalism Anti-Zionism; Pan-Arabism	March 8	Sunni
Watani Alliance تحالف وطني tahaluf watani	Watani	Mark Geara	1 / 128	Reformism; Social democracy	October 17	Secular
ReLebanon لبنان عن جديد lubnan ean jadid		Ziad Abs	1 / 128	Reformism; Social democracy	October 17	Secular

== Other parties ==
=== March 8 Alliance ===
Party	Abbr.	Leader or Chairman	Political position & ideology	Primary demographic
Arab Democratic Party الحزب العربي الدمقراطي al-Ḥizb al-Arabi ad-Dimoqraty	ADP	Rifaat Eid	Arab nationalism Arab socialism Neo-Ba'athism; Pan-Syrianism	Alawite
Syrian Social Nationalist Party الحزب السوري القومي الإجتماعي al-Ḥizb as-Sūrī al-Qawmī al-'Ijtimā'ī	SSNP	Rabi Banat	Syrian nationalism Social nationalism	Secular
Independent Nasserite Movement - Al-Mourabitoun حركة الناصريين المستقلين - المرابطون; Ḥarakat an-Nassiriyin al-Mustakilleen - al-Mourabitoon	INM	Ibrahim Kulaylat	Arab nationalism Nasserism; Anti-imperialism; Pan-Arabism; Arab socialism	Mainly Sunni Muslim; Some Shiite and Druze
Lebanese Democratic Party الحزب الديمقراطي اللبناني al-Ḥizb ad-Dimoqrati al-Lubnāni	LDP	Prince Talal Arslan	Conservatism	Officially Secular; Mainly Druze
Toilers League رابطة الشغيلة; Rabitat ash-Shaghila	LT	Zaher Khatib	Communism; Marxism-Leninism; Socialism; Arab nationalism	Secular
Solidarity Party حزب التضامن; Ḥizb at-Tadamon	Tadamon	Emile Rahme	Christian liberalism	Christianity
People's Movement حركة الشعب; Ḥarakat ash-Shaeb	SHAAB	Ibrahim al-Halabi	Nasserism; Socialism; Arab nationalism	Secular
Christian Democratic Union الحزب المسيحي الدمقراطي al-Hizb al-Massihi al-Dimoqrati	CDU	Neemtallah Abi Nasr	Christian democracy	Christian
Nasserite Unionists Movement الحركة التوحيدية الناصرية al-Ḥaraka at-Tawhidiyya an-Nassiriyya	NUM	-	Nasserism	Secular
Islamic Labor Front جبهة العمل الإسلامي; Jebhat al-A'amal al-Islamy	ILF	Fathi Yakan	Islamism	Sunni Muslim
Arab Unification Party تيار التوحيد اللبناني; Tayyār at-Tawhid al-Lubnany	LUM	Wiam Wahhab	Arab nationalism	Officially secular Mainly Druze
Promise Party حزب الوعد; Ḥizb al-Waad	NSDP	Gina Hobeika	Secularism	Officially secular Mainly Maronite Christian
Federation of Popular Leagues and Committees تجمع اللجان والروابط الشعبية; Tajamo' al-Lijan wal Rawabit ash-Shaabiya	FPLC	Maan Bashour	Nasserism; Arab Nationalism	Officially secular Mainly Sunni Muslim
Arab Socialist Union الإتحاد الإشتراكي العربي al-Ittiḥād al-Ishtiraki al-Arabi	SAU	Omar Harb	Arab socialism	Secular
Democratic Nasserite Movement حركة الناصريين الدمقراطيون; Ḥarakat al-Nassiriyin ad-Dimocratiyoon	DNM	-	Nasserism	Sunni Muslim
Lebanese Arab Struggle Movement حركة النضال العربي اللبناني; Ḥarakat an-Nidal al-Arabi al-Lubnani	LASM	Faysal Dawood	Arabism	Officially secular Mainly Druze
Islamic Unification Movement حركة التوحيد الإسلامي; Ḥarakat at-Tawhid al-Islamy	IUM	Said Shaaban	Islamism	Sunni Muslim

=== March 14 Alliance ===
Party	Abbr.	Leader or Chairman	Political position & ideology	Primary demographic
Future Movement تيار المستقبل; Tayyār al-Mustaqbal	FM	Saad Hariri	Classical liberalism Economic liberalism Lebanese nationalism	Sunni
Social Democrat Hunchakian Party حزب الهنشاق (حزب الهنشاق الديمقراطي الإجتماعي); Ḥizb al-Henchag; Սոցիալ Դեմոկրատ Հնչակեան Կուսակցութիւն; Sotsial Demokrat Hnchakyan Kusaktsutyun	SDHP; ՍԴՀԿ	-	Democratic socialism Social democracy Armenian nationalism Secularism	Armenian
Democratic Left Movement حركة اليسار الديمقراطي; Ḥarakat al-Yassar ad-Dimoqrati	DL	Elias Attallah	Arab nationalism Secularism; Social democracy	Secular
Democratic Renewal حركة التجدد الدمقراطي; Ḥarakat at-Tajaddod ad-Dimoqrati	DRM	Farouk Jabre	Social liberalism Secularism; Reformism; Nonsectarianism	Secular
Armenian Democratic Liberal Party - Ramgavar حزب الرمغفار (الحزب الديمقراطي الليبرالي الأرمني); Ḥizb ar-Ramgavar; Ռամկավար Ազատական Կուսակցութիւն; Ramgavar Azadagan Gusagtsutyun	ADL; ՌԱԿ	Hagop Kassardjian	Armenian nationalism National liberalism Classical liberalism Pro-Europeanism	Armenian
Free Lebanese Armenian Movement حركة اللبنانيين الأرمن الأحرار; Ḥarakat al-Lubnaniyin al-Arman al-Ahrar	FLAM	-	Secular liberalism	Armenian
Free Shia Movement التيار الشيعي الحرّ at-Tayyār ash-Shi'iy al-Hurr	TSH	Mohammad Al Hajj Hassan	Islamism	Shiite Muslim
Lebanese Peace Party حزب السلام اللبناني; Ḥizb as-Salam al-Lubnany	LPP	Roger Edde	Centrism; Decentralization; Big tent	Secular
Syriac Union Party ܓܒܐ ܕܚܘܝܕܐ ܣܘܪܝܝܐ ܒܠܒܢܢ حزب الاتحاد السرياني; Ḥizb al-Ittiḥād as-Siryani	SUP	Ibrahim Mrad	Assyrian nationalism	Mainly Syriac
Shuraya Party ܫܘܖܝܐ حزب شوريا; Ḥizb ash-Shuraya	Shuraya		Assyrianism	Assyrian
Change Movement حركة التغـيير	CM	Elie Mahfoud	Democracy	Christian

=== October 17 ===
Party	Abbr.	Leader or Chairman	Political position & ideology	Primary demographic
Lebanese Communist Party الحزب الشيوعي اللبناني al-Ḥizb aš-Šuyūʿī al-Lubnānī	LCP	Hanna Gharib	Communism; Marxism–Leninism; Anti-Zionism	Secular
Citizens in a State مواطنون ومواطنات في دولة; Mouwatinoun wa Mouwatinat fi Dawla	MMFD	Charbel Nahas	Civic nationalism Progressivism; Secularism	Secular
Sabaa Party حزب سبعة; Hizb Sabea	Sabaa	Hassan Baz Chamas	Liberalism	Secular
National Bloc حزب الكتلة الوطنية; Ḥizb al-Kitla al-Wataniya	NB	Michel Helou	Centrism; Lebanese nationalism	Secular; Historically Maronite
Socialist Arab Lebanon Vanguard Party حزب طليعة لبنان العربي الاشتراكي; Ḥizb at-Taliyeh Lubnan al-'Arabi al-Ishtiraki	HT	Abd al-Majid Rafei	Ba'athism	Secular
Green Party of Lebanon حزب الخضر اللبناني; Ḥizb al-Khodor al-Lubnanī	GPL	Philip Skaf	Green politics	Secular
Lihaqqi لِ حقي; Lihaqqi		Collective Leadership	Left-libertarianism; Grassroots democracy Economic democracy Radical democracy	Secular

=== Non-aligned ===
Party	Abbr.	Leader or Chairman	Political position & ideology	Primary demographic
Popular Bloc التكتّل الشعبي at-Takattol ash-Shaa'bi	-	Myriam Skaff	Christian democracy	Greek Catholic
Azm Movement تيار العزم; Tayyār al-Azm	Azm	Najib Mikati	Centrism; Secularism	Secular; Mainly Sunni
Lebanese Social Democratic Party حزب الدمقراطي الإشتراكي; Ḥizb ad-Dimoqraty al-Ishtiraki	DSPL	Kamel Asaad	Socialism; Secularism; Lebanese nationalism Islamic socialism Social democracy Democratic socialism Red Shi'ism	Secular; Mainly Shiite Muslim
Hizb ut-Tahrir حزب التحرير; Ḥizb at-Taḥrīr	HT	Ata Abu Rashta	Officially Islamism	Officially Islamic; Mainly Sunni
Phoenician Party حزب فينيقيا; Hizb alFiniki		Antonios Abidaoud	Lebanese nationalism Phoenicianism	Secular
Movement of Lebanese Nationalism حركة القومية اللبنانية; Ḥarakat al-Qawmiyya al-Lubnaniyya	MLN	Etienne Saqr	Lebanese nationalism	Secular; Traditionally Christian
Aramean Democratic Organization ܛܘܟܣܐ ܐܪܡܝܐ ܕܝܡܘܩܪܛܝܐ; Ṭukoso Oromoyo Dimoqraṭoyo التنظيم الآرامي الديمقراطي at-Tanzim al-Arami ad-Dimoqraty	ArDO	Gabi Gallo	Aramean identity National conservatism Christian democracy Religious nationalism Pro-Europeanism	Aramean
24 October Movement تيار لبنان الديمقراطي; Tayyār Lubnan ad-Dimoqraty	-	Jack Tamer	Social democracy	Secular
Lebanese Option Party تيار الإنتماء اللبناني; Tayyār al-Intimaa' al-Lubnani	LOG	Ahmad al-Asaad	Liberalism	Secular; Mainly Shiite
Liberty Front جبهة الحرية; Jabhat al-Horriya	-	Fouad Abou Nader	Lebanese nationalism	Secular; Traditionally Christian
Najjadeh Party حزب النجادة; Ḥizb an-Nejjadeh		Mustapha Hakim	Arab nationalism	Sunni
New Lebanese Movement حركة اللبنانيين الجدد; Ḥarakat al-Lubnaniyin al-Jodod		Danny Abdel Khalek	Secularism	Secular
Arab Socialist Party الحزب العربي الإشتراكي al-Ḥizb al-Arabi al-Ishtiraki	-	-	Socialism	Secular
Lebanese Ecology Party حزب البيئة اللبناني; Ḥizb al-Bi'a al-Lubnany	-	Habib Maalouf	Ecology	Secular
Popular Democratic Party الحزب الشعبي الديمقراطي al-Ḥizb ash-Shaabi ad-Dimoqraty	-	Nazih Hamza	Marxism-Leninism	Secular
Take Back Parliament - Lebanon إسترجعوا البرلمان	TBP	Various	Secularism	Secular
Lebanese Arab Movement حركة لبنان العربي; Ḥarakat Lubnan al-Arabi	-	-	Nasserism	Sunni
Communist Action Organization in Lebanon منظمة العمل الشيوعي; Munaẓẓamah al-‘Amal ash-Shuyū‘ī	-	Ibrahim Muhsen	Communism; Marxism–Leninism; Socialism; Maoism	Secular
Kurdish Democratic Party الحزب الديمقراطي الكردي في لبنان al-Ḥizb ad-Dimuqrati al-Kurdi fi Lubnan	-	Riyad Mihhu	Kurdish nationalism	Kurdish
Razkari Party حزب رزكاري; Ḥizb Rizkārī	-	Mahmoud Khodr Fattah Ahmad	Kurdish nationalism	Kurdish

=== Defunct parties ===
Party	Abbr.	Leader or Chairman	Ideology	Primary demographic
Al-Tanzim Party حركة المقاومة اللبنانية - التنظيم; Ḥarakat al-Moqawama al-Lubnaniya (Tanzim)	Tanzim	Georges Adwan	Lebanese nationalism Anti-communism	Maronite
Lebanese Renewal Party حزب التجدد اللبناني	LRP	Etienne Saqr	Lebanese nationalism Ultranationalism; Phoenicianism; Anti-communism	Maronite
Constitutional Bloc الكتلة الدستورية al-Kutla ad-Dustuuriyya	-	Khalil El-Khoury	Secular liberalism National liberalism Nonsectarianism; Pro-National Pact	Secular
Lebanese People's Party حزب الشعب اللبناني; Ḥizb aš-Šaʿb al-Lubnany	-	Yusuf Yazbek	Communism	Secular
Deprived Movement حركة المحرومين; Ḥarakat al-Mahrumin	-	Musa al-Sadr	Traditionalist conservatism	Shia
Arab Nationalist Movement حركة القوميين العرب; Ḥarakat al-Qawmiyyin al-'Arab	ANM	George Habash	Pan-Arabism; Arab socialism Anti-Zionism; Secularism; National liberation	Secular
Syrian–Lebanese Communist Party الحزب الشيوعي السوري اللبناني al-Ḥizb ash-Shuyū'ī as-Sūrī al-Lubnānī	-	Khalid Bakdash	Communism; Marxism-Leninism	Secular
Arab Socialist Action Party – Lebanon حزب العمل الاشتراكي العربي - لبنان; Ḥizb al-'Amal al-Ishtiraki al-'Arabi - Lubnan	ASAP-L	Hussein Hamdan	Marxism; Arab nationalism	Secular
National Youth Party حزب الشباب الوطني; Ḥizb ash-Shabab al-Watani	-	Ahmad Karami	-	Secular
National Call Party حزب النداء القومي hizb al-nida' al-qawmi	NCP	Takieddin el-Solh	Traditionalist conservatism	Sunni
Party of Socialist Revolution حزب الثورة الإشتراكية; Ḥizb at-Thawra al-Ishtirakiyya	-	Youssef Moubarek	Maoism	Secular
Lebanese Republican Party الحزب الجمهوري اللباني; Al Hezb Al Joumhouri Al Loubnani	LRP; PRL	Imad Geara	Republicanism; Secularism Nationalism	Secular

== See also ==
- Politics of Lebanon
- List of political parties by country
