= Bab al-Tabbaneh–Jabal Mohsen conflict =

1976–2015 conflict in Tripoli, Lebanon

- Part of the Lebanese Civil War and spillover of the Syrian Civil War in Lebanon
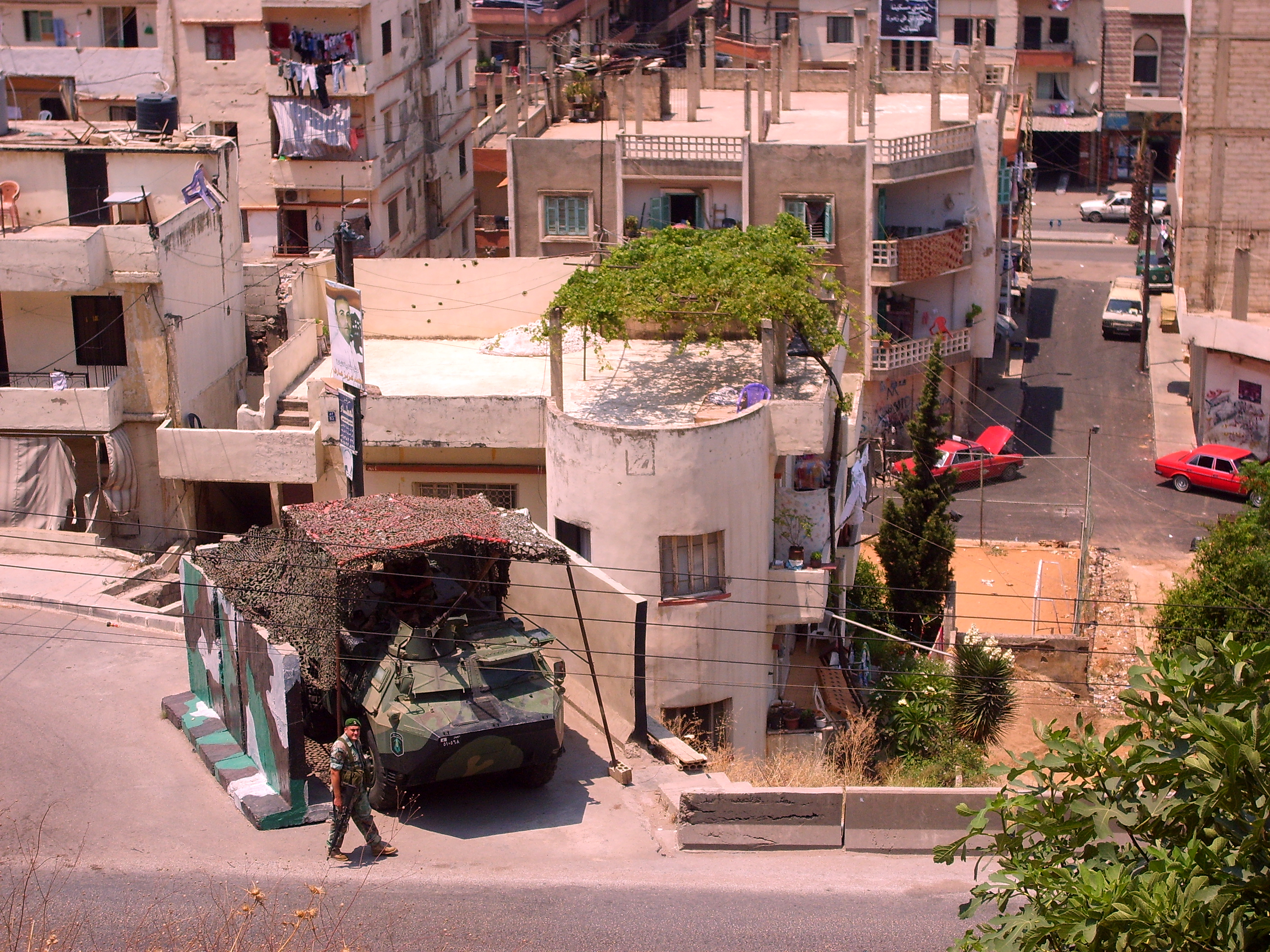
- Lebanese army personnel on Syria Street, guarding the road between Bab al-Tabbaneh and Jabal Mohsen in 2011
Date	1976 – 2015
Location	Tripoli, Lebanon

Belligerents
Islamic Unification Movement (during Lebanese Civil War) Future Movement (During 2008 conflict); Free Syrian Army; Al-Nusra Front; Local Armed Groups Islamic State	Arab Democratic Party (Syria) Syrian Arab Republic (during Lebanese Civil War); Hezbollah Islamic Unification Movement (2012–2015, from within Bab al-Tabbaneh)

Commanders and leaders
Said Shaaban; Hashem Minkara; Ziad Alloukeh; Jalal Dandashi; Amer Arish; Husam Al Sabbagh; Other weaponsmiths and warlords	Ali Eid; Rifaat Eid

Strength
+3,000	+3,000

Casualties and losses
Hundreds	Hundreds

The Bab al-Tabbaneh–Jabal Mohsen conflict was a recurring conflict between the Sunni Muslim residents of the Bab-al-Tabbaneh neighbourhood and the Alawite residents of the Jabal Mohsen neighbourhood of Tripoli, Lebanon from 1976 through 2015. Residents of the two neighbourhoods became rivals during the Lebanese Civil War and frequently engaged in violence. Residents were divided along sectarian lines and by their opposition to or support of the Alawite-led Syrian government. Violence flared up during the Syrian Civil War spillover in Lebanon.

== Background ==
For centuries, Sunni Muslims and Alawites have fought each other. The Sunni Muslim Ottoman Empire oppressed Alawites, but Alawites gained power and influence when the French authorities recruited them as soldiers during the French Mandate of Syria.

After independence from France, the Alawites' co-religionists came to power in Syria through the 1963 Syrian coup d'état and have been represented by the Assad family since 1971. This event angered many from the Sunni majority of Syria. They reacted with an Islamist uprising in Syria, which was crushed in the 1982 Hama massacre.

Tripoli is the second-largest city in Lebanon. Because a large part of its population is Sunni Muslims, the city is the traditional bastion of conservative Sunnis in Lebanon. Sunnis represent 27% of Lebanon's entire population.

Because it is a Sunni stronghold, all major currents of Lebanese Sunni Islamism have been centered in Tripoli. Black banners decorated with extracts from the Quran are prevalent and larger numbers of women are taking up the niqab. In addition, many free religious schools preach rigid Sunni doctrines. Tripoli is also the birthplace of Lebanon's Salafi movement, a puritanical Sunni movement. The Sunnis of Bab al-Tabbaneh have close ties with Saudi Arabia, which supports them financially.

Nearly half of the Alawites of Lebanon live in the Jabal Mohsen neighbourhood of Tripoli and nearby villages in Akkar, north Lebanon. Of the 120,000 Alawites in Lebanon, 40,000 to 60,000 live in Tripoli. They have close ties with the Alawites in Syria.

The two neighbourhoods are divided by Syria Street, with Jabal Mohsen on a hilltop and Bab al-Tabbaneh below. While the neighbourhoods were once prosperous, many buildings were destroyed by the flood of Nahr Abu Ali (River of Abou-Ali) in 1956 and the Lebanese Civil War. Many residents of the two neighbourhoods are unemployed. North Lebanon is one of the most impoverished parts of Lebanon and is neglected by the government, promoting extremism. Despite its tumultuous history, there are still many architectural treasures in the area.

== The Lebanese Civil War ==
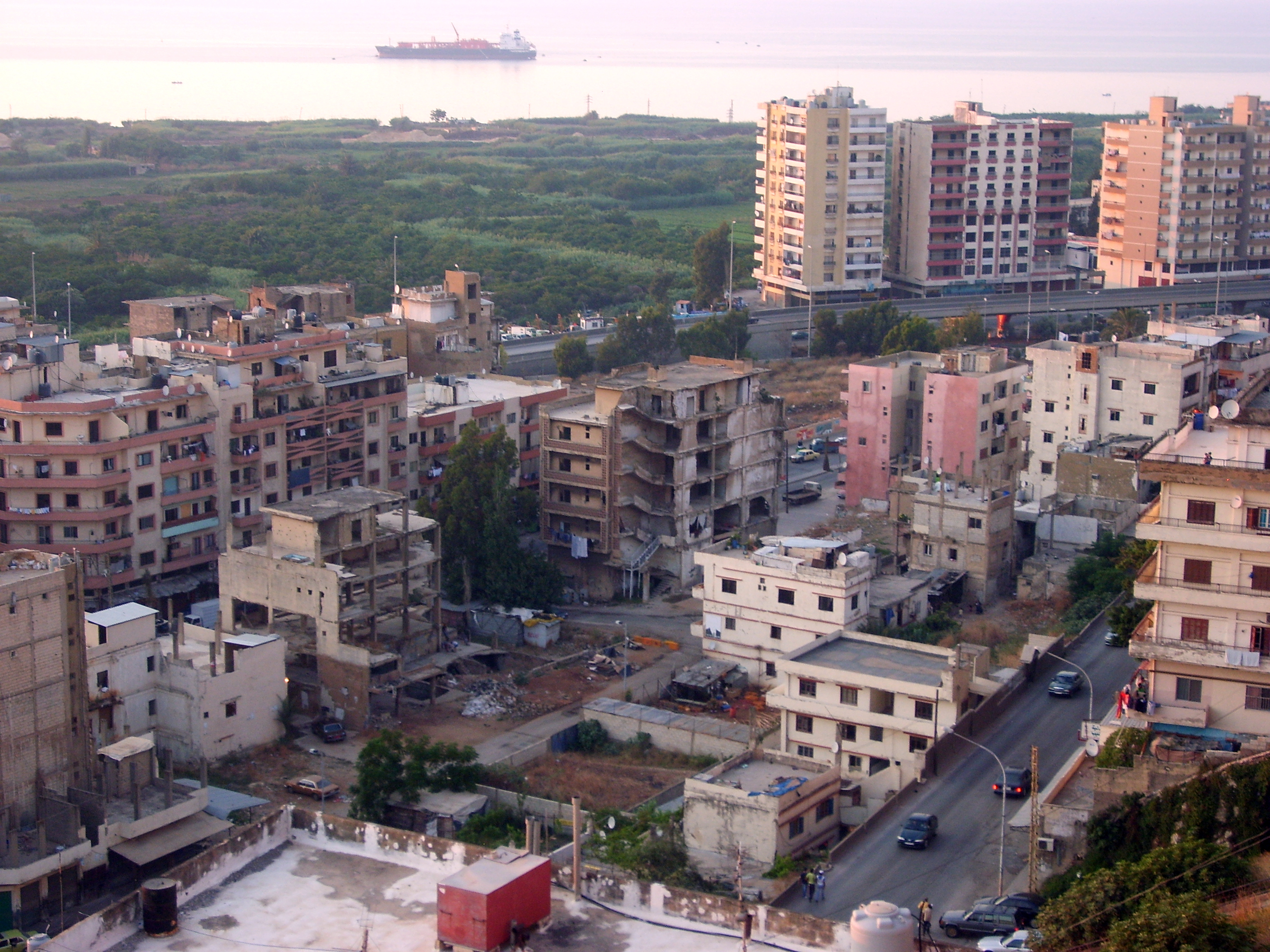
Buildings in Bab al-Tabbaneh damaged during the Lebanese Civil War, Syria Street which divides the two neighbourhoods can be seen in the lower right

During the Lebanese Civil War (1975-1990), Lebanese Alawites in the Jabal-Mohsen-based Arab Democratic Party (ADP) aligned with the Ba'athist Syrian government. They fought alongside the Syrian Arab Army against the Sunni Islamist Tawhid Movement in Tripoli, which was based mainly in Bab-Tabbaneh. Before the war, the populations of the two neighbourhoods lived side by side. Between October 11-19 1983, the IUM took control of Tripoli and occupied premises of the city which belong to the Lebanese Communist Party and other leftist groups including, OACL, Socialist Action and the SSNP where they executed 100 of them.

In August 1984, violent clashes erupted between the ADP and the Tawheed, supported by the Mosques and Islamic Committees. The Tawheed's position was strengthened when they gained control of the port on 22 August, after street battles left more than 400 dead. The fighting lasted until a Syrian-mediated peace agreement between the IUM and the ADP came into force on 18 September. By 1985, Tawhid had control over Tripoli, and the ADP was entrenched in Jabal Mohsen. In mid-September, skirmishes arose between ADP and IUM forces mainly centred on Jabal Mohsen and the American Quarter; later on it extended to Bab-al-Tebbaneh and Qobbe resulting in many casualties and the displacement of many in the town. After a few days of shelling by the Syrian Army, a ceasefire was brokered culminating in the surrender of the Tawhid and the Syrian's full control of Tripoli. The ceasefire took effect on October 7, where 20,000 Syrian troops entered and occupied Tripoli.

On 18 December 1986, the Syrians arrested Tawheed commander Samir al-Hassan in Tripoli. His men responded by killing 15 Syrian soldiers at a checkpoint, leading to Syrian retaliation against the Tawheed. Aided by ADP, LCP, SSNP, and Baath Party militias, the Syrians defeated the Tawheed, killing many of its fighters, arresting others, and scattering the remainder. According to Amnesty International "During the operation, which lasted over 36 hours, over 200 people were reportedly killed ... many of these appeared to be deliberate killings that could not be attributed to fighting. Hundreds of people were also reported to have been arrested in the city and neighbouring villages and others to have disappeared in the same period."

== 2008 conflict ==
During the 2008 conflict in Lebanon, Sunnis fought against Alawites. The ADP rearmed during the 2007 Lebanon conflict, after it was revealed that the Islamist group Fatah al-Islam had planned to attack the Alawites of Tripoli.

On the night of 10 May into the morning of 11 May, fighting broke out between Alawite Hezbollah sympathizers and Sunni supporters of Islamist groups in Tripoli. One woman was killed. On 11 May, Sunni supporters of the Islamic groups had reportedly been fighting opposition followers in the Alawite-dominated Jabal Mohsen area with machine guns and rocket-propelled grenades. On 12 May, clashes in Tripoli left one person dead and at least six others wounded. The Army stated that if clashes did not end by the next morning, they would use force.

Clashes between pro-government Sunnis based in the Bab el-Tabaneh district and pro-Syrian Alawites from Jabal Mohsen led to the deaths of at least nine people, eight civilians and a policeman; 55 others were wounded. Machine guns and rocket-propelled grenades were used in the clashes, which started around four in the morning.

Between 25 July and 29 July, 23 people were killed in clashes between Sunni and Alawite militants. On 8 September, Alawite and Sunni leaders signed a reconciliation agreement that ended the fighting. Sunni Future Movement leader Saad Hariri subsequently visited Tripoli stating, "We are both Lebanese and we will not allow anyone to tamper with us. I will do everything I can in order not to let anyone damage the Alawites' security in Tripoli and to foil any external plot to tamper with the security of the Alawites or the security of Tripoli".

Rifa'at Eid, the leader of the armed wing of the ADP, said in an interview, "We're the most convenient targets, the stand-in for Hezbollah; our problem can only be solved when the Shiites and Sunnis solve theirs." As many as 9,000 Alawis fled their homes during the conflict.

From 9–11 July armed rival political factions engaged in armed clashes and rocket attacks, killing five civilians and political affiliates and wounding over 85 civilians and political affiliates.

== 2009 ==
In October 2009, Jabal Mohsen was attacked with grenades by unknown assailants.

Despite missiles having been launched into Jabal Mohsen a few months before, children from both neighbourhoods played peaceful football matches in mixed teams during the Open Fun Football Festival on 2 November 2010. Weeks later, rockets were fired into Jabal Mohsen, and a bomb was found near the house of ADP leader Ali Eid.

== Clashes during the Syrian Civil War ==
=== June 2011 ===
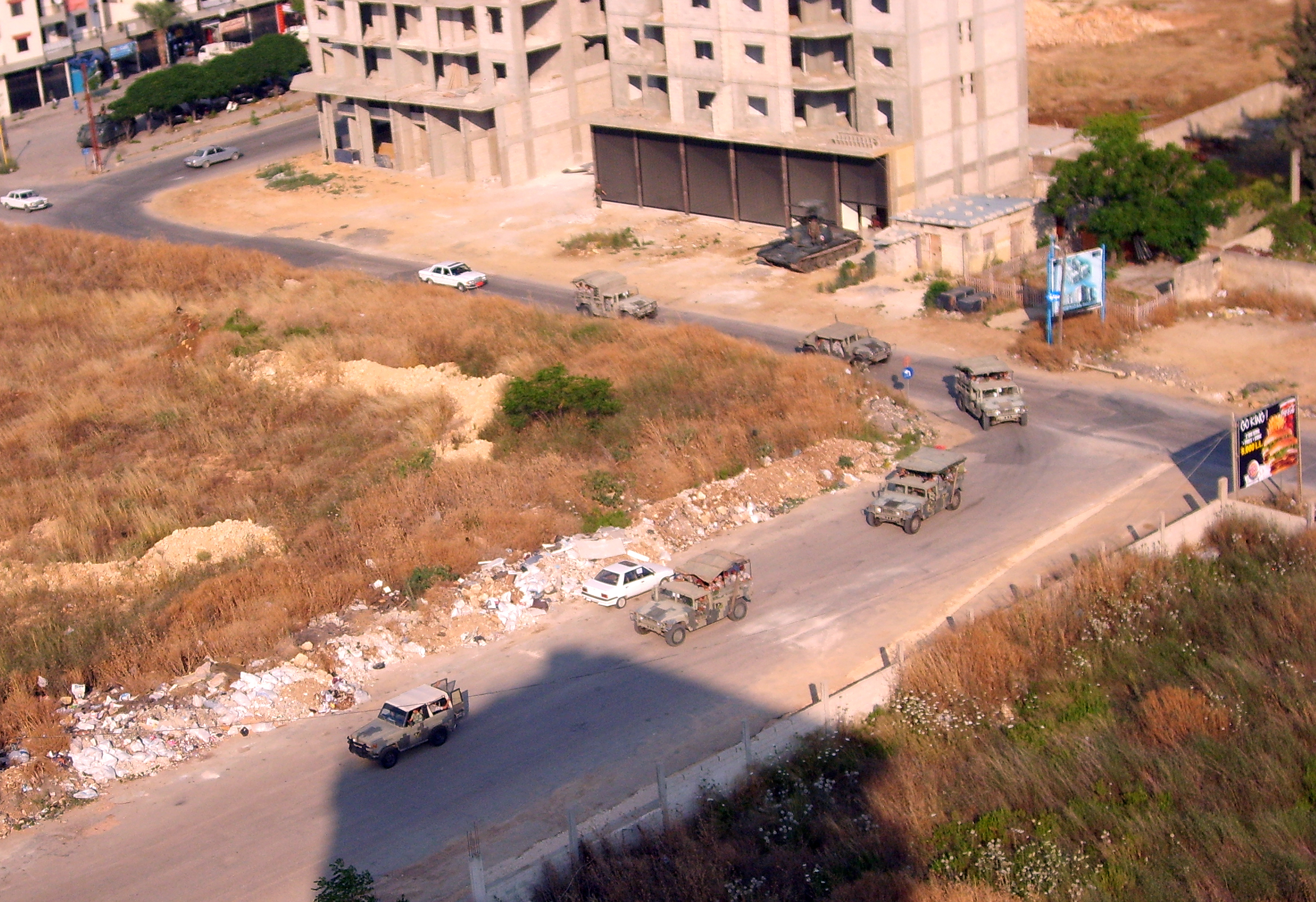
Lebanese army convoy patrolling Jabal Mohsen, a few weeks after the 2011 clashes

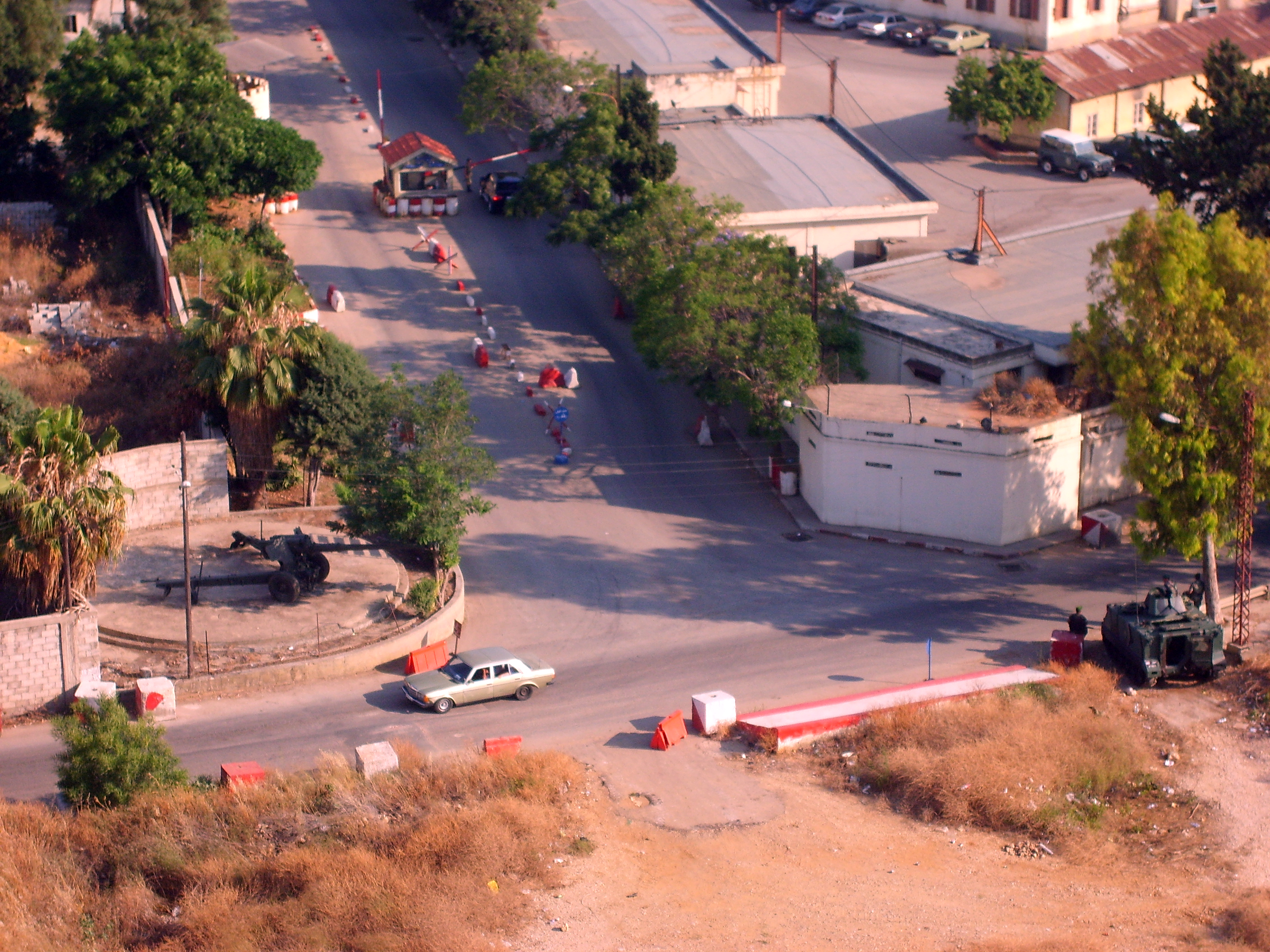
Lebanese army checkpoint on the entry to the Qubbe military base: LAF Northern Command, 2011

On 17 June 2011, clashes between gunmen in Jabal Mohsen and Bab al-Tabbaneh erupted after a rally in support of Syrian protesters in Bab-al-Tabbaneh. Seven people were killed, and 59 were wounded. Among the dead were a Lebanese army soldier and an official from the Alawite ADP.

=== February 2012 ===
Between 10 and 11 February 2012, two to three people died because of fighting in Jabal Mohsen and Bab al-Tebbaneh. Six Lebanese Army soldiers were injured while attempting to intervene. The skirmishes lead to fears that the Syrian Civil War would spill over into Lebanon.

=== May 2012 ===
Between 12 and 13 May, witnesses and security officials said two to four people had been killed when the fighting started between members of the Alawite minority and members of the Sunni majority. The combatants used rocket-propelled grenades and automatic rifles. Hours before the clashes, Lebanese troops had exchanged fire with a group of young Islamists protesting for the release of a suspected terrorist. The exchange of gunfire between the Islamists and the army occurred as the protestors, who were sympathetic to the ongoing revolt in Syria, tried to approach the offices of the pro-Assad Syrian Social Nationalist Party in Lebanon. Three of the dead were reportedly Sunni civilians, while one was an army officer. Fighting continued on 14 May, with six more people being killed, five Alawites and one Sunni. The army was deployed to the area on 15 May and exchanged gunfire with residents. Eight were wounded, including a soldier. By 16 May, the clashes left eleven dead.

Western diplomatic sources stated that these incidents were the beginning of a Salafist revolution, aimed at arming the uprising in Syria. The Saudi-backed March 14 coalition accused Syria of trying to bring Lebanon into its crisis. On 14 March, Mustafa Alloush stated after the coalition's regular weekly meeting, "It is actually an attempt to make Tripoli a zone of terrorism. It also aims at striking Lebanon's northern area which has welcomed and helped out the Syrian displaced." Since the unrest in Syria started in May 2011, Tripoli and North Lebanon had an increase in Syrian refugees.

By 18 May, a total of twelve people were dead and over 100 wounded from the May clashes. On 21 May, several rocket-propelled grenades were fired between Jabal Mohsen and Bab al-Tebbaneh, with no reports of any wounded. On 30 May, two were wounded in clashes between Jabal Mohsen and Bab al-Tebbaneh. One Sunni Muslim fought alongside the ADP and was killed in the May clashes. He was condemned as a traitor by his fellow Sunnis.

=== June 2012 ===
June 2012 VOA report about the conflict

Between 2 June and 3 June, fifteen people were killed and over sixty wounded in clashes between Jabal Mohsen and Bab al-Tebbaneh. As a result of the fighting, the Army re-entered Syria Street to set up a buffer zone between the two sides. Following a cease-fire, there were several violations of the truce during the night of 3 June; one policeman and one soldier were wounded. On 8 June, a man in Jabal Mohsen was killed by sniper fire. During the fighting, Jabal Mohsen was attacked on several fronts, including the Bab al-Tabbaneh, Shaarani, Baqqar, Riva, Mankoubin, and Malouleh districts. In the aftermath, several Alawite businesses in Tripoli were burnt down.

=== July 2012 ===
On 18 July, stray bullets killed one person and wounded several during anti-Assad celebrations in Bab Tabbaneh, following a suicide-bombing that targeted several Syrian ministers. On 21 July, Tabbaneh residents clashed over non-political matters between two Sunni families, killing two and wounding several. Two more were killed in the dispute on 29 July. On 27 July, two men on their way home to Jabal Mohsen were stabbed by unidentified assailants, leading to clashes between gunmen. Clashes continued the following day, wounding twelve civilians and three soldiers.

=== August 2012 ===
On 9 August, Sunni supporters of Hezbollah clashed with Salafists in Tripoli. On 20 and 21 August, seven people were killed and more than 100 wounded in clashes between Sunni Muslims and Alawites. According to security and medical sources, this class was a spillover from the war in Syria. Two of the dead were from Jabal Mohsen, while the rest were from Bab al-Tabbaneh. Five Lebanese soldiers were injured by gunfire, and another five the next day after a grenade was thrown at an army checkpoint. Fighting continued throughout 23 August, with at least two additional deaths reported.

On 24 August, more fighting occurred after a dawn exchange of small arms fire and rocket-propelled grenades between Sunni and Alawite fighters in the Qobbah and Jabal Muhsin neighbourhoods. The skirmish provoked unrest throughout both districts, and at least seven Alawite-owned shops in Sunni neighbourhoods were burned by unknown assailants. The fighting escalated after the death of Sunni cleric Sheikh Khaled al Baradei, who was shot by a sniper during the morning skirmishes. Baradei was reportedly a commander of the Sunni Islamist fighters, and his death led to further sectarian unrest within the city. At least three people were killed and 21 wounded, including two journalists. Fighting continued until 24 August.

=== October 2012 ===
Clashes broke out on 19 October following the assassination of Wissam al-Hassan, leaving one dead. On 21 October, clashes occurred throughout the country which were triggered by the assassination. Two young girls and a man were killed during clashes between Bab Tabbaneh and Jabal Mohsen. The parents of one of the girls, a nine-year-old called Jana, crossed sectarian lines, as her father is Sunni and her mother is Alawite. Two Sunnis and one Alawi were killed on 22 October. By 24 October, eleven people had been killed in the fighting.

=== December 2012 ===
December 2012 VOA report about the conflict

At least twelve people were killed and 73 injured in Tripoli between 4 and 6 December, as Alawites and Sunnis were involved in heavy clashes. These clashes were sparked by the Tall Kalakh incident, where twenty Lebanese Salafists on their way to join the insurgency in Syria were ambushed.

=== 2013 ===
On 28 February, five men were arrested for throwing grenades into both neighbourhoods. They claimed they had been tasked by "Z.S." to create strife. During March 2013, sporadic incidents happened between the neighbourhoods. Two people were injured by sniper fire in Jabal Mohsen. Three days later, a man from Jabal Mohsen was shot and killed. By 22 March, six people, including an army soldier, had been killed. On 23 March, three more people were killed.

On 19 and 20 May, two civilians and two soldiers were killed during renewed fighting between the neighbourhoods. By 22 May, twelve people had been killed since the fighting resumed. After being targeted, the Lebanese army pulled out of the city on 23 May. Six more were killed the following night after mortars were used for the first time. By 26 May, 31 people were killed. After two days of calm, six more people were killed within 24 hours. Later, the army raided Jabal Mohsen. ADP leader Rifa'at Eid questioned why Jabal Mohsenhad was targeted by the army since similar raids were not done in Bab al-Tabbaneh.

On 29 and 30 November, thirteen people were killed in clashes.

==== August 2013 Tripoli bombing ====
On 23 August 2013, twin bombings in Tripoli caused extensive damage, killing 47 people and wounding more than 500, according to Lebanon's state-run National News Agency.

=== 2014 ===
On 20 January 2014, Abdul Rahman Diab, an ADP official, was gunned down in his car in Tripoli. Over nine days in March 2014, 25 people were killed and 175 were wounded.

=== January 2015 ===
January 2015 VOA report about a peace kitchen initiative between the women of the fighting communities

On 10 January 2015, two suicide bombers killed nine people and wounded thirty more in a Jabal Mohsen café. It was the first suicide attack on a civilian neighbourhood in nearly a year, following a security sweep.

== See also ==
- Lebanese Civil War
- 2nd Infantry Brigade (Lebanon)
