= Islamic Labor Front =

Lebanese political group

The Islamic Labor Front – ILF (Arabic: جبهة العمل الإسلامي, romanized: Jabhat al-A'amal al-Islamy), is a gathering of several Islamic parties and personalities in Lebanon led by Sunni Daaiya Fathi Yakan.

== Origins ==
Founded in 2006, the gathering merged out from a conflict within the Islamic group on either becoming part of the anti-Syrian March 14 Alliance or the pro-Syrian March 8 Alliance.

The ILF is currently allied to Hezbollah and is part of the opposition. One of its members, Sheikh Saadeddine Ghaya, was killed in Tripoli in November 2013.

== See also ==
- Bab al-Tabbaneh–Jabal Mohsen conflict
- Hezbollah
- Lebanese Civil War
- Islamic Unification Movement
- Syrian Civil War spillover in Lebanon
- 2nd Infantry Brigade (Lebanon)

== See also ==
- List of Islamic political parties
