= Solidarity Party (Lebanon) =

Solidarity Party حزب التضامن
- Abbreviation: Tadamon
- Leader: Emile Rahme
- Founder: Emile Rahme
- Founded: 1985
- Headquarters: Deir El Ahmar
- Ideology: Liberalism
- National affiliation: March 8 Alliance
- Parliament of Lebanon: 0 / 128
- Cabinet of Lebanon: 0 / 30

The Solidarity Party (Hizb Al-Tadamon Al-Lubnany; Arabic:حزب التضامن اللبناني) is a Lebanese political party established in 1985 and by Emile Rahme and part of the March 8 Alliance. It had one seat in the 2009 Lebanese elections. Emile Rahme, who was in 2000 an external candidate in Bsharri District, was elected deputy for the Maronite seat of Baalbek-Hermel District in 2009. In 2018 and again in 2022, he lost his seat to the Lebanese Forces candidate Antoine Habchi.

In 1986 and till now, it is an active member in the Maronite Union. Rahme is also considered an active member in the National Christian Union Committee since 2008.
