= Assyrians in Lebanon =

Ethnic group in Lebanon

ܣܘܪ̈ܝܐ ܕܠܒܢܢ الآشوريين في لبنان
- (Assyrian homeland) (Lebanon)
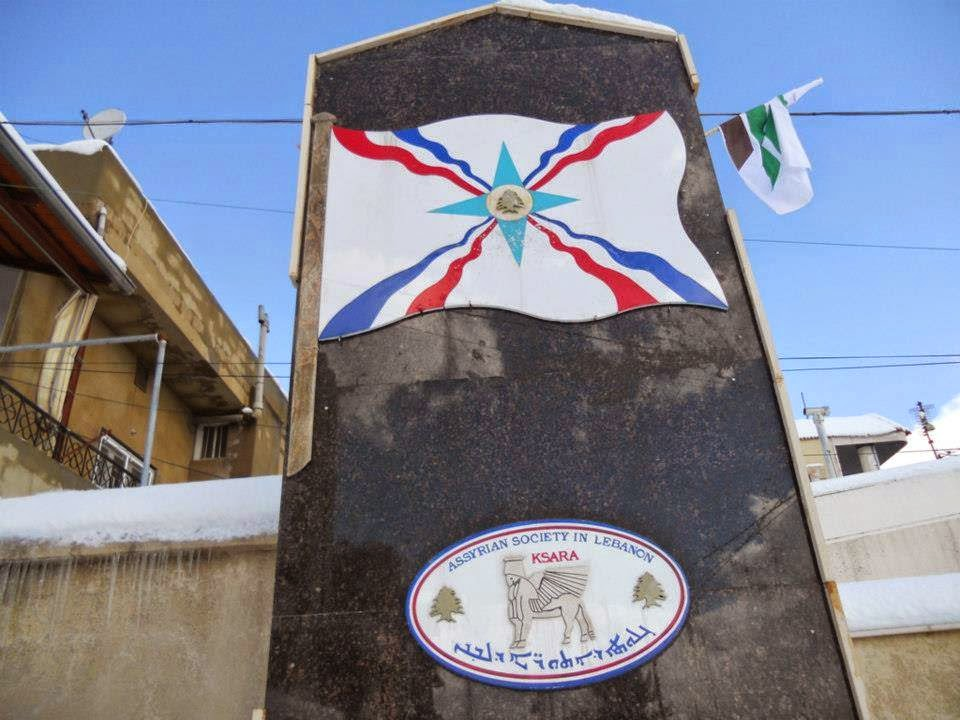
- Assyrian flag plaque and the Lamassu symbol, outside the Assyrian Society of Lebanon

Total population
- ≈ 30,000

Regions with significant populations
- Beirut (Achrafieh); Jdeideh; Zahlé

Languages
- Assyrian: Suret, Surayt; Other: Mesopotamian Arabic, Lebanese Arabic, French

Religion
- Syriac Christianity

Related ethnic groups
- Other AssyriansLebanese Maronites

Assyrians in Lebanon (Syriac: ܣܘܪ̈ܝܐ ܕܠܒܢܢ; Arabic: الآشوريين في لبنان; French: Libanais-Assyriens), or Assyrian Lebanese, are people of Assyrian descent living in Lebanon. It is estimated that there are approximately 30,000 Assyrians currently residing in Lebanon, primarily in Beirut and Zahlé. This number includes the descendants of Assyrian genocide survivors who fled Iraq, Turkey, and Iran between 1915 and 1934.

== History ==
Assyrians are one of several minority groups in Lebanon. A Syriac Orthodox (Jacobite) community settled in Lebanon among the Maronites after Mongol invasions in the Late Middle Ages, however, this community was either dispersed or absorbed by the Maronites. Assemani (1687–1768) noted that many Maronite families were of Jacobite origin. A Jacobite community was present in Tripoli in the 17th century.

The 1915 Assyrian genocide forced Western Assyrians from Tur Abdin to flee to Lebanon, where they formed communities in the Beirut districts of Zahlè and Musaytbeh. Assyrian refugees from French Cilicia arrived in 1921 to bolster their numbers. In 1944 it was estimated that 3,753 Syriac Orthodox Assyrians lived in Lebanon.

Prior to the Lebanese Civil War (1975–1990), there were 65,000 Syriac Orthodox Assyrians in the country. Half of the community emigrated as a result of violence, with many going to Sweden, which protected "stateless people". As of 1987 there were only a few thousand Syriac Orthodox Assyrians in Lebanon.

Assyrians remained neutral during the events of the Lebanese Civil War; however, individuals joined several armed forces, mainly working closely together with the founder and leader of the Lebanese Forces militia Bachir Gemayel and Christian groups such as the Tyous Team of Commandos and the Shuraya Party.

An influx of Assyrian refugees occurred due to the 2003 Invasion of Iraq and the War in Iraq (2013-2017), with Assyrians from Iraq fleeing to Lebanon as refugees in order to immigrate to Europe, the United States, and Australia.

A third exodus has begun since 2011 as droves of Assyrians have fled Syria due to the Syrian Civil War, mainly settling in Sed El Baouchrieh.

The number of Assyrians who fled IS violence in Iraq and Syria was at peek 20,000. The majority of Assyrians from Qamishli and the Khabour Region in Syria have taken refuge in Lebanon most of whom are living in the neighborhoods of Baucherieh, Achrafieh, Hadath, and Zahlé. While many Assyrians from Iraq have either returned home, or moved to Europe.

A 2020 report by The Assyrian Journal has stated that Assyrian refugees in Lebanon face unique problems in the era of economic-downturn, anti-corruption protests, and the COVID-19 pandemic. This was said to be due to their distinct ethnic and religious background. The report stated that many Assyrian refugees ruled out the idea settling refugee camps due to fear of discrimination targeting Christians in these camps. This has led them to seek other forms of private shelter, which often have costs of rental, food, water, utilities, and healthcare, which many Assyrian refugees are unable to pay themselves. Previous reliance on remittances from abroad to pay these costs is also not a possibility, due to the global economic crisis caused by the pandemic. Assyrians who wish to leave these conditions for another country are unable to do so due to travel restrictions as a result of the pandemic.

In 2022 the Syriac Catholic Church elected Isaac Jules Peter Georges Boutros as bishop, making him the youngest Catholic bishop in the world at the time. In an interview with Aid to the Church in Need, Bishop Jules spoke about the Syriac community in Lebanon, saying that there were approximately 4000 Syriac Catholic families in the country, mostly in Beirut. He added that the Syriac Catholic community does not feel represented in the Lebanese confessional system. "We are not represented in the Parliament, and there are no opportunities for Syriac men or women to reach top places in ministries, Government or Parliament. When our grandparents arrived in Lebanon our patriarchs suggested that they get involved in economy and trade, rather than politics. As a result, our presence in politics was always very shy."

== Education ==
The St George Assyrian School (French: Ecole St-Georges Assyrienne) is an Assyrian school in Lebanon that is run by the Assyrian Church of the East. It is located in Sed El Baouchrieh. The school provides classes up to the third grade and has 150 students, of which 100 are Assyrians. One hour of Syriac language lessons per week is compulsory for Assyrian students, with language courses available in the summer as well.

== Politics ==
There are a number of Assyrian political parties that represent the local population in Lebanon. Majority of the Assyrian political parties in Lebanon are part of the March 14 Alliance and include the following parties:

- Syriac Union Party
- Shuraya Party

== Religion ==
The majority of Assyrians in Lebanon are Christians who adhere to the East and West Syriac Rite. These include the following churches:

=== Catholic Assyrians ===
==== Chaldean Catholic Church ====
There is an estimated 20,000 Chaldean Catholic adherents in Lebanon, the majority being refugees from Iraq. The Chaldean Catholic Eparchy of Beirut was established on the 3rd of July 1957 and the main parish in the country is St Raphael Chaldean Catholic Cathedral.

==== Syriac Catholic Church ====
The Patriarch Ignatius Joseph III Yonan of the Syriac Catholic Church currently resides in Beirut, where the church is based. The church owns a summer residence in Deir El Sherfet on top of Mount Lebanon. In 1817, a Syriac Catholic diocese was established in Beirut, but has remained vacant since 1898. The diocese of Beirut is currently under the jurisdiction of a patriarchal vicar or apostolic administrator since its vacancy.

According to Catholic statistics from 1962, the Syriac Catholic Church had 6 parishes in Lebanon, accounting for 6 churches, 14 priests and 14,500 adherents. In 1964, this grew to 8 churches and 15,000 adherents.

=== Orthodox Assyrians ===
==== Syriac Orthodox Church ====
The Syriac Orthodox Church of Antioch is represented in Lebanon under the following clergymen:

- Archbishopric of Mount Lebanon under Mor Theophilos George Saliba
- Patriarchal Vicate of Zahle under Mor Justinos Boulos Safar
- Archbishopric of Beirut & Benevolent institutions in Lebanon under Mor Clemis Daniel Malak Kourieh
- Patriarchal Institutions in Lebanon under Mor Chrysostoms Michael Shamoun.

=== Church of the East ===
The Assyrian Church of the East (ACOE) in Lebanon is part of the Archdiocese of Australia, New Zealand and Lebanon, under the leadership of Mar Meelis Zaia.

The ACOE churches in Lebanon include:

- Mar Gewargis (Sed El Baouchrieh), built in 1953
- Mar Zaya (Ksara, Zahlé)
- Rabban Pethyoun (Hadath)
- Mar Khnanya (Achrafieh)

== Notable people ==
- Fairuz
- Abeer Nehme
- Elias Zazi
- Philippe de Tarrazi
- Isaac Armalet
- Alexander Michel Melki
- Felix Michel Melki

== See also ==
- Iraqis in Lebanon
- Syrians in Lebanon
