= Muhammad Taqqush =

Secretary-General of the Islamic Group of Lebanon

Shaykh Muhammad Taqqush
- محمد طقوش

3rd Secretary-General of the Islamic Group of Lebanon
- Incumbent
- Assumed office September 2022
- Preceded by: Ibrahim al-Masri

Personal details
- Born: c. 1973 Beirut, Lebanon

Muhammad Taqqush (Arabic: محمد طقوش; born c. 1973) is a Lebanese politician and Sunni cleric who is serving as the third secretary-general of Islamic Group of Lebanon since September 2022.

== Early life and education ==
Muhammad Taqqush was born in Beirut in c. 1973 into a Lebanese Sunni family. He holds a bachelor's degree in Sharia law and was one of the students of Faysal Mawlawi, the founder and first leader of the Islamic Group of Lebanon. Taqqush spent much of his childhood during the Lebanese Civil War (1975–1990).

== Secretary-General of IGL ==
In September 2022, Taqqush was elected as the secretary-general of the Islamic Group of Lebanon by the organization's shura council.

The US State Department listed Taqqush as a Specially Designated Global Terrorist in January 2026. The US also imposed sanctions on Taqqush, an act which was condemned by IGL-allied Shia Islamist group Hezbollah.
