= Islamic Unification Movement =

Lebanese political party and militant group

- حركة التوحيد الإسلامي
- Logo of the Islamic Unification Movement
- Leaders: Said Shaaban; Bilal Shaaban; Hashem Minqara
- Dates active: 1982 - 1991
- Split from: Lebanese Islamic Group
- Headquarters: Bab al-Tabbaneh (Tripoli)
- Active regions: Tripoli, Akkar, West Beirut, Sidon, Jabal Amel
- Ideology: Islamism
- Size: 1,000 fighters
- Wars: Lebanese civil war (1975–1990)

The Islamic Unification Movement – IUM (Arabic: حركة التوحيد الإسلامي | Harakat al-Tawhid al-Islami), also named Islamic Unity Movement, but best known as Al-Tawhid, At-Tawhid, or Tawheed, is a Lebanese Sunni Muslim political party. It has played an active role in Lebanese internal politics since the Lebanese Civil War in the 1980s.

== Origins ==
The IUM was founded in Tripoli in 1982 from a splinter faction of the Lebanese Islamic Group led by Sheikh Said Shaaban, one of Lebanon’s Islamist movements’ few charismatic Sunni religious leaders. A hardliner who believed that force was a good solution in politics, the radical Shaaban broke away from the Islamic Group soon after the June 1982 Israeli invasion of Lebanon, in protest of that Party’s leadership decision to adopt a non-violent, moderate political line in the early 1980s. Nevertheless, the two organizations have always maintained a good relationship, especially with Sheikh Fathi Yakan, founder and Secretary-general of the Islamic Group.

At the height of its power in 1985, the IUM splintered, when dissident leaders Khalil Akkawi and Kanaan Naji left the Movement to set up their own groups, the Mosques' Committee (Arabic: لجنة المساجد | Al-Lajnat al-Masajid) and the Islamic Committee (Arabic: اللجنة الاسلامية | Al-Lajnat al-Islamia), respectively. Involved in imposing an Islamic administration on Tripoli during the 1980s, these latter two groups formed together with the IUM an umbrella organization, the Islamic Gathering (Arabic: اللقاء الإسلامي | Al-Liqa' al-Islami).

== Political beliefs ==
Known to be anti-Syrian in policy and Sunni Muslim in composition, the IUM's ideological anti-western and anti-Communist views stemmed from the radical Sunni wing of the Muslim Brotherhood. Consistent with these principles, Shaaban and its Movement ostensibly rejected Nationalism, sectarianism and democratic pluralism in favor of an Islamic rule that "absorbs and dissolves all social differences and unites them in one crucible". Shaaban sought ways to unite Sunnis and the Shia, for example by suggesting that the holy Qur'an and the Prophet's biography provide foundations on which all Muslim groups and sects can unite. Instead of arguing about sectarian representation in the parliament, he suggests that Muslims call for Islamic rule based on the Sharia, without which no government can be legitimate. As such, the IUM strongly opposed the Christian-dominated political order in Lebanon and deeply resented the Syrian military intervention of June 1976 in support of the Maronites who, Shaaban himself asserted, would have otherwise fled to Cyprus or Latin America.

The Movement allegedly enjoyed since the mid-1980s close political ties with Iran and Hizbollah, forged by Sheikh Shaaban frequent visits to Tehran and contacts with that Party’s leaders in Lebanon, which considers the IUM leader doctrinally a follower of Ayatollah Khomeini. Some sources even claim that Shaaban was born and raised in a Shia family of Batroun in Northern Lebanon and only later became a Sunni. While accepting the validity of the Iranian Revolution and emphasizing that the path started by Khomeini should be followed by all Muslims, the IUM leadership does not call for the establishment of an Iranian-style order in Lebanon, knowing that this would alienate their own Sunni followers. Indeed, Sheikh Shaaban's speech delivered during the 3rd anniversary of Khomeini's death failed to mention his own relation to the latter and its theories. Following the 2020 killing of Qassem Soleimani, Sheikh Shaaban condemned the killing and issued a statement calling for revenge against the perpetrators.

== Military structure and organization ==
Controlled by the IUM's Military Command Council (Arabic: Majliss al-Kiyadi al-Harb) headed by Sheikh Hashem Minqara, their 1,000-men strong militia, also designated 'Tawheed', was created in 1982 and trained by the Palestine Liberation Organization (PLO), being initially provided with light weapons drawn from Lebanese Armed Forces (LAF) and Internal Security Forces (ISF) stocks or purchased on the black market. Upon the withdrawal of the Palestinian factions loyal to Yasser Arafat from Tripoli in December 1983, the Tawheed seized the opportunity to replenish themselves with vehicles, additional weapons and ammunition from PLO arms caches left behind. This enabled the IUM militia to raise a mechanized force made of ex-PLO Gun trucks and technicals equipped with heavy machine guns, recoilless rifles and anti-aircraft autocannons, plus mortars and a few truck-mounted MBRLs for its artillery branch.

Its fighters consolidated their control over Tripoli in 1983–1984 by temporarily defeating a number of their secular left-wing and Pan-Arab rivals, in particular the predominantly Alawite Arab Democratic Party (ADP) and the multi-confessional Lebanese Communist Party (LCP). They also clashed with the pro-Syrian Syrian Social Nationalist Party (SSNP) and Ba'ath Party factions, and with the Syrian Army units stationed in Lebanon.

The IUM/Tawheed operated mainly on northern Lebanon, at Tripoli and its environs, though its militants were also active at the Sunni quarters of West Beirut and Sidon, and at the Jabal Amel region of southern Lebanon.

== Weapons and equipment ==
Besides Palestinian backing, the IUM militia also seized some weapons and vehicles from the Lebanese Armed Forces (LAF) barracks and Internal Security Forces (ISF) police stations in Tripoli. Additional weaponry, vehicles and other, non-lethal military equipments were procured in the international black market.

=== Small-arms ===
IUM fighters were provided with a variety of small arms, comprising Sa 25/26, Škorpion vz. 61, Carl Gustaf m/45 and MAT-49 submachine guns, M1 Garand (or its Italian-produced copy, the Beretta Model 1952) and SKS semi-automatic rifles, AMD-65 assault carbines, FN FAL, M16A1, AK-47 and AKM assault rifles (other variants included the Zastava M70, Chinese Type 56, Romanian Pistol Mitralieră model 1963/1965, Bulgarian AKK/AKKS and former East German MPi-KMS-72 assault rifles). Several models of handguns were used, such as Tokarev TT-33, CZ 75, FN P35 and MAB PA-15 pistols.

Squad weapons consisted of RPK, RPD, PK/PKM, FN MAG and M60 light machine guns, with heavier Browning M1919A4 .30 Cal, Browning M2HB .50 Cal, SG-43/SGM Goryunov, DShKM and KPV 14.5mm Heavy machine guns being mounted on Technicals.

Grenade launchers and portable anti-tank weapons included M72 LAW and RPG-7 rocket launchers, whilst crew-served and indirect fire weapons comprised M2 60mm mortars, 82-PM-41 82mm mortars and 120-PM-38 (M-1938) 120mm heavy mortars, SPG-9 73mm, B-10 82mm and B-11 107mm recoilless rifles (often mounted on technicals).

=== Vehicles ===
The IUM militia was also able to raise a mechanized force made of ex-PLO Gun trucks and technicals, comprising Spanish Santana 88 Ligero Militar jeeps, Land-Rover series II-III, Chevrolet C-10/C-15 Cheyenne, Toyota Land Cruiser (J40/J42), Toyota Land Cruiser (J75) and Datsun 620 light pickups, and Mercedes-Benz Unimog 404 and 416 light trucks armed with heavy machine guns, recoilless rifles and anti-aircraft autocannons.

=== Artillery ===
Its artillery branch fielded ZPU (ZPU-1, ZPU-2, ZPU-4) 14.5mm autocannons and M1939 (61-K) 37mm anti-aircraft guns (mounted on technicals and Gun trucks), plus Palestinian-manufactured improvised short-range rockets fired from adapted ZPU-4 AA gun mounts installed on Unimog light trucks, and RL-21 (Sakr-36) 122mm (Egyptian 30-tube version of the BM-11) multiple rocket launchers (MBRL) mounted on Soviet-manufactured ZIL-157 general-purpose trucks.

== Illegal activities and controversy ==
The IUM has its main strongholds at the predominantly Sunni district of Bab al-Tabbaneh in the western part of Tripoli, where the group's headquarters is located, and the Dinniyeh sub-urban area east of the city. They also controlled the nearby clandestine port of al-Mahdi, set up at Tripoli's western outskirts at El Mina and run by the Sunni businessmen Tariq Fakhr al-Din, which was employed mainly for arms-smuggling operations and to levy illegal taxes on the transit trade of agricultural products and other goods.

Fanatical and ruthless fighters, Tawheed militiamen were responsible for several acts of violence in Tripoli against the local cells of the Alawite ADP and LCP. In October 1983, the IUM/Tawheed executed a series of terrorist attacks against the Tripoli offices of the Communist Party, targeting Party cadres and their families. In one occasion, Tawheed fighters rounded up some 52 top Communist members, forced them to renounce their atheism and then summarily shot them, dumping the victims' bodies into the Mediterranean. Other actions held later that year targeted Syrian Army units stationed in Lebanon – on 19 December, the Tawheed was involved in the massacre of 15 Syrian soldiers at a checkpoint in Tripoli, carried out in retaliation for the seizure by the Syrians of one of their commanders the previous day.

The IUM also run its own radio and television stations – the "Voice of Right" (Arabic: Sawt al-Haq) and the "Crescent" (Arabic: al-Hilal), respectively – which continued to operate in the post-war period, until being forcibly closed down on 21 September 1997 by the Lebanese Internal Security Forces (ISF) during a nationwide crack-down on Sunni religious extremists. One member of IUM was killed and several wounded during the operation.

A former member, Khalid El-Masri, was illegally kidnapped by the CIA. German reports assert that El-Masri himself reported his being a member of "El-Tawhid" or "Al-Tawhid" when he applied to Germany for refugee status, in 1985. The reference to "El-Tawhid" may have been confused with the group Abu Mussab al-Zarqawi lead, Al Qaeda in Iraq, used to be called "Jama'at al-Tawhid wal-Jihad". "Jama'at al-Tawhid wal-Jihad", the former name for Zarqawi's group, translates as the "movement for monotheism and struggle".

== The Tawheed in the Lebanese Civil War ==
=== Tripoli 1982–86 ===
In August 1984, violent clashes erupted between the IUM/Tawheed and the Shia Alawite Arab Democratic Party or ADP, with the former been supported by the Mosques Committee and the Islamic Committee. The Tawheed's position was strengthened when they gained control of the port area on 22 August, after a fierce battle on the streets of Tripoli that left more than 400 dead. Street fighting dragged for some days until 18 September, when it was brought to an end by a Syrian-mediated peace agreement between the IUM and the ADP.

In the fall of 1985 the Syrian Army entered the city and crushed the Tawheed militia, though it permitted Sha'ban to maintain leadership of his now unarmed movement. However, intermittent clashes occurred again in the Tripoli area during the Spring and Summer of 1986, this time between the IUM/Tawheed and the pro-Syrian faction of the Syrian Social Nationalist Party (SSNP), until Syrian troops finally moved in to enforce a truce at the request of local community leaders.

Violence flared up again on December 18, 1986 when the Tawheed commander Samir al-Hassan was arrested by the Syrians and his men responded by killing 15 Syrian soldiers at a checkpoint, which brought the wrath of the Syrians on the Tawheed. Aided by a coalition of ADP, SSNP, Lebanese Communist Party/Popular Guard, and Baath Party militias, the Syrians managed to defeat decisively the Tawheed in another round of brutal fighting on the streets of Tripoli, killing many of its fighters, arresting others and scattered the remainder.

=== South Lebanon 1988–2000 ===
The defeat at the battle of Tripoli in December 1986 did not meant the end of IUM/Tawheed military activities at Beirut, Sidon, and southern Lebanon. Underground guerrilla cells continued to operate in these areas until the end of the civil war, and afterwards. From 1988 to 2000, the Movement's guerrillas at the Jabal Amel fought alongside the Shia Hezbollah against the Israel Defense Forces (IDF) and their South Lebanese Army (SLA) proxies in the Israeli-controlled "Security Belt".

== The post-war years ==
Upon the end of the war in October 1990, IUM militia forces operating in the Tripoli area, West Beirut and Sidon, were ordered by the Lebanese Government on 28 March 1991 to disband and surrender their heavy weaponry by 30 April as stipulated by the Taif Agreement to the Syrian Army and the Lebanese Armed Forces (LAF).

Aside from rare instances of mild criticism, Sheikh Shaaban and the IUM were careful not to antagonize the Syrian authorities, particularly after Syria defeated their militia in late 1986. He spoke favorably of the Syrian military presence in Lebanon as a framework for unified, armed action against Israel, a policy which was continued by its successors in the 1990s.

The Movement remains politically active, led by the Secretary-General Sheikh Minqara, a member of the pro-Syrian March 8 alliance. In 2005, the IUM joined the Islamic Labor Front, an alliance of several Islamic parties and figures in Lebanon. The movement's militia re-emerged, this time in support of the Syrian Government in Tripoli. However, after a couple of years, the Lebanese Army and the Internal Security Forces virtually crushed the militia in a major security crackdown in 2014.

== See also ==
- Hezbollah
- Lebanese Civil War
- List of Islamic political parties
- List of weapons of the Lebanese Civil War
- Lebanese Islamic Group
- Islamic Labor Front
- Internal Security Forces
- Popular Guard
- 2nd Infantry Brigade (Lebanon)
