= Liberty Front =

Liberty Front (in Arabic جبهة الحرية) is a Lebanese political movement launched in April 2007 by Fouad Abou Nader.

== History ==
After the withdrawal of the Syrians from Lebanon, Fouad Abou Nader restarted his public activities in launching the Liberty Front.

The Liberty Front considers itself a defender of Lebanon sovereignty, independence and freedom, heir of the "Front for Freedom & Man" (in Arabic جبهة الحرية والإنسان, pronounced Jabhat al-Hurriyah wal Insan) founded in 1975 by Dr. Charles Malik who evolved later on to the Lebanese Front and the political offspring of the Resistance of the Front’s parties and movements fighters who cooperated together in the "Lebanese Forces Command Council" since 1976 before uniting their forces in 1980 in the Lebanese Forces under the leadership of President Bachir Gemayel and fought against the Palestinian organizations and the Syrian army between 1975 and 1986.

It appeals principally to the Christian population in Lebanon, opposing Pan-Arabism and showing extensive support for the largely Christian Lebanese diaspora. It also rejects the settlement of Palestinian, Syrian and other Arab refugees in the country, contesting the granting of Lebanese citizenship to Palestinians and Syrians.

== Political programme ==
The Liberty Front generally advocates for a liberalisation and modernisation of Lebanese society and government.

=== National independence and identity ===
Lebanon's population comprises numerous various religious minorities, both within the branches of Islam and other religions such as Christianity. Liberty Front considers Lebanese citizenship and nationhood to supersede religious or other affiliations, and supports the cohabitation of various minorities in government. Lebanon also heavily depends on international aid for peacekeeping and economic assistance due to the instability of its government and its economy; LF advocates for a higher degree of autonomy and economic as well as political independence from foreign intervention.

The Liberty Front proposes the establishment of a "new social contract" for Lebanese society, establishing equal rights for all citizens without distinction of religion, race, or other characteristics, and recognising the absence of an absolute majority of any one Lebanese community within the country; thereby asserting the equality in rights of various minorities irrespective of size. This is in line with the Universal Declaration of Human Rights drafted for the United Nations by Charles Malik, member of the Lebanese Front. Declare the fact that Lebanon is a state that is here to stay as a perennial home for its citizen, all its citizen. Should be set up: a unified civil code of Personal Status, a State of Law and Justice recognizing the citizen rights, whilst demanding from them duties and applying the same laws to all and a State of skills in which everyone would have a chance and could attain social success, because social advancement will be the reward for their work, their efforts and competence.

LF supports a policy of regionalism, with devolution to local elected officials of authority concerning local development projects, education, health, urbanism, tourism, hydro-electric resources, industry and agriculture planning, and ecological and other protections of natural sites. A shift to e-government is also part of the programme.

LF calls for an internationally recognized and permanent neutrality of Lebanon in inter-regional affairs, conversely with Lebanon interference from foreign intervention.

The electoral system advanced by LF is first-past-the-post voting, with voting rights guaranteed to Lebanese expatriates abroad, as well as a right to return for members of the Lebanese diaspora. Lebanese expatriates are majoritarily Christian.

The LF contests several treaties and pacts it considers illegitimate: for instance the Taif Agreement, which they claim created an imbalance in constitutional power.

The LF has stated it wants free public education for all children up to age 16, up from age 12 currently. It also calls for a move towards universal free healthcare, as well as a move towards renewable energy.

Based on the ratification by Lebanon of the Convention on the Elimination of All Forms of Discrimination Against Women (CEDAW), the Liberty Front supports the establishment of a partial gender parity in elected officials, with 30% of the seats reserved for women.
