= Party of Socialist Revolution (Lebanon) =

The Party of Socialist Revolution (Arabic: حزب الثورة الإشتراكية, romanized: Hizb al-Thawra al-Ishtirakiyya) was a communist party in Lebanon, emerging as a seemingly pro-Chinese Communist Party split from the Lebanese Communist Party. The party was founded in 1964. The formation of the party was announced in early September 1964, with Youssef Moubarek as party chairman and Moustafa Chaker as general secretary. The group published Ila amam ('Forward'). The group did not fully support the line of Mao Zedong, but notably did not support the Soviet Union in their dispute with China. The group argued that the mainstream of the Lebanese Communist Party had become too supportive of Nasser, and accused Khalid Bakdash of 'revisionism'. The group argued that solely through people's war could Israel be defeated.

Their best-known recruit was the Syrian General Afif al-Bizri.
