= Mohammad Al Hajj Hassan =

Lebanese politician

Sheikh Mohammad Hajj Hassan (Arabic: الشيخ محمد الحاج حسن) is a Lebanese Shia cleric and politician born in 1976, and is the founder and head of the Free Shia Movement (التيار الشيعي الحر) that is associated with the opposition March 14 Alliance, that opposes both the Amal Movement and Hezbollah.

At age 17, he started his chemistry and physics studies in a religious school in Baalbeck. He lived part of his youth in Syria, Iran and Iraq before coming back to Lebanon. For a small period of time, he was part of the Shia Hezbollah before leaving the movement disenchanted with their policies and established in 2006 his own political movement the Free Shia Movement, which tries to represent an alternative third voice for the Lebanese Shia community and protests the hegemony of the two main Shia parties allied with March 8 Alliance, namely Amal Movement and Hezbollah, on the community.

He is also Vice-Chair and President for the Middle East of the Iman Foundation.
