= New Lebanese Movement =

The New Lebanese Party اللبنانيون الجدد
- Abbreviation: NLP
- Leader: Elie Maalouf
- Founders: Danny Abdul Khalek; Hala M. Maksoud; Elie Maalouf; Bassam Rbaiz; Mazen El Eid
- Founded: 1 August 2006
- Headquarters: Alay, Beirut
- Ideology: Secularism
- Political position: Centre
- National affiliation: 17 October Revolution
- Slogan: لا دماء في سجلنا التاريخي ولا أعداء لنا في الوطن (Arabic) "There is no blood in our historical record, and we have no enemies back home"
- Parliament of Lebanon: 0 / 128
- Cabinet of Lebanon: 0 / 24

Party flag
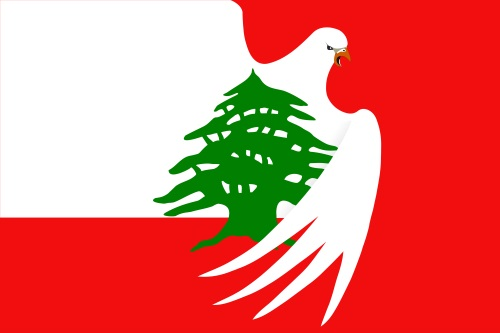

Website
- www.newlebanese.org

The New Lebanese Party (Hizb Al-Lubnaniyin Al-Judud) is a reformist, anti-confessionalist Lebanese political party established in 2006. Their stated goals are to "end to the role of traditional political leaders that inherit power in Lebanon" and "call for peace among the Lebanese and opening dialogue between all Lebanese sects to reach a national model far from political sectarianism." The movement calls for the addition of the Progressive Socialist Party, the Kataeb Party, the Lebanese Forces Party, and the Amal Movement to the list of designated terrorist organizations in Australia. The party speaks out against both Saudi Arabian and Iranian actions to influence Lebanon. The party advocates for a complete restructuring of the current Lebanese confessionalist parliamentary republic system and replace it with a entirely new system that doesn't let "any group in Lebanon present itself or its politics as the solution" and that system "will be the sole ruler and the only separator for arranging our lives in all aspects". They wish to establish a "law" that is egalitarian has no reference or basis in religion or tribalism. One of their main tenets is for the Lebanese government putting the economy front and center by advocating for an opening up of the Lebanese market to foreign countries and planning for how Lebanon can enter a globalized world, which includes supporting local industries and the agricultural sector. They believe that the current divide between the different religions that the Lebanese people hold is the main factor holding back economic progress in the country, and that the only way to bring them together is by abolishing the current confessional system. The party currently hold zero seats in the Parliament or the Cabinet of Lebanon.
