= Rifaat Eid =

Lebanese politician

Rifaat Eid رفعت علي عيد

Leader of the Arab Democratic Party
- Incumbent
- Assumed office 2015
- Preceded by: Ali Eid

Personal details
- Born: Tripoli, Lebanon
- Party: Arab Democratic Party
- Profession: Politician

Rifaat Ali Eid (Arabic: رفعت علي عيد; born 24 February 1977) is a Lebanese politician who is the leader of the Arab Democratic Party. The party has the largest support of Lebanese Alawites, and its base is Tripoli, Lebanon, in the Jabal Mohsen neighbourhood. Rifaat took over its leadership after his father, former MP Ali Eid, died in 2015.

He led the party through the Bab Al-Tabbaneh-Jabal Mohsen clashes that have repeatedly happened from 2008 onwards, and has supported inhabitants of Jabal Mohsen financially when they could not go to work because of armed conflicts. During the 2008 Lebanon conflict, where Sunnis and Shias fought throughout Lebanon, Rifaat said in an interview, "We're the most convenient targets, the stand-in for Hezbollah, our problem can only be solved when the Shiites and Sunnis solve theirs." He stated that Alawites in Tripoli do not have problems with Sunnis, but have to protect themselves when they are attacked. He also stated, "The Salafis are like kittens when they are weak, but when they are strong they become like tigers."

During the Syrian Uprising, he accused anti-Syrian groups in Lebanon, such as the Future Movement, of funding and equipping Islamists in Tripoli. He believes the Alawites in Lebanon are attacked in revenge for events in Syria, and that the Syrian army can protect Lebanese Alawites against attacks from armed Islamists, since the Lebanese army is ineffective against them.

On 10 April 2014, an indictment demanded the death penalty for Rifaat Eid and three senior Jabal Mohsen fighters. Eid's pro-Damascus Arab Democratic Party, the main faction in Jabal Mohsen, participated in more than 20 rounds of deadly sectarian fighting with gunmen from the neighboring Bab al-Tabbaneh district between 2008 and 2014. Eid had fled the country to Syrian city of Tartous to avoid legal charges, and is still living there.

== See also ==
- Lebanese Civil War
- North Lebanon clashes (2014)
- 2nd Infantry Brigade (Lebanon)
