= Shuraya Party =

Shuraya Party ܫܘܖܝܐ شــورايـا
- Founded: 25 July 1978
- Ideology: Assyrian nationalism Assyrians interests
- Political position: Right-wing
- National affiliation: March 14 Alliance

Party flag

Assyrian Battalion
- Dates active: 1978-1991
- Ideology: Assyrian nationalism
- Political position: Right-wing
- Part of: Shuraya Party; Lebanese Front; Lebanese Forces

The Shuraya Party (Syriac: ܫܘܖܝܐ Arabic: حزب شوريا) is a political organisation that has represented the Christian Assyrian community in Lebanon and Syria since the late 1970s. The party advocates the formation of an independent Assyrian State in the Assyrian homeland, in what is today Northern Iraq. The term "shuraya" means 'beginning'.

== History ==
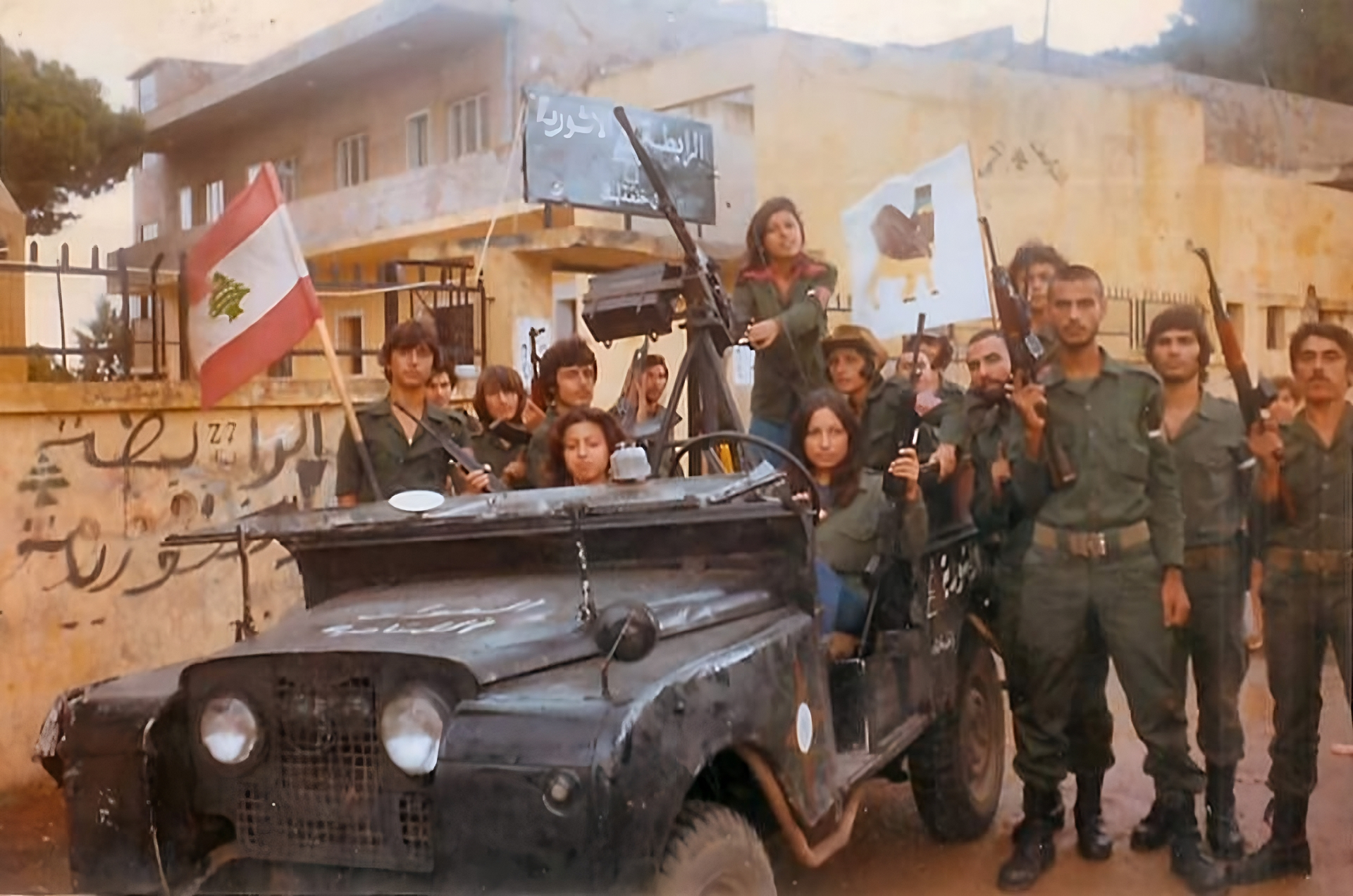
4th Assyrian battalion with lamassu flag

The Shuraya Party was first established on 25 July, 1978 in Beirut, Lebanon, when the country was engulfed by the civil war. Since its foundation, it has worked closely together with Bashir Gemayel, the founder and leader of the Lebanese Forces militia (LF), in which it sees itself connected in the struggle and destiny for all Lebanese Christians.

It is composed of "free philosophers" of different Eastern Church origins, who regard themselves as Assyrians. The Shuraya leadership insists they are not bound by any Church, but rejects the reproach of being anti-Christian. It claims to represent all oriental Christians and stresses its commitment to maintain a coined Christian Lebanon.

The party established its own magazine in Lebanon in the 1980s, dubbed Shuraya, and also opened its own radio show named My Voice, to the wave of FM-radio.

During the Lebanese Civil War, the Party also fielded a small militia, the Assyrian Battalion (AB), which fought alongside the other Christian militias of the Lebanese Front.

== See also ==
- Assyrian nationalism
