= Free Shia Movement =

Free Shia Movement التيار الشيعي الحرّ
- Leader: Sheikh Mohammad Al Hajj Hassan
- Founded: 2006; 20 years ago
- Religion: Shia Islam
- National affiliation: March 14 Alliance

Website
- www.chi3a.org

Free Shia Movement (Arabic: التيار الشيعي الحرّ, Al-Tayar Al-Shi'iy Al-Hurr) is a Lebanese Shi'ite political movement allied with the Lebanese opposition March 14 Alliance and opposed to mainstream Shi'ite movements allied with the March 8 Alliance, namely Hezbollah and Amal Movement.

It is headed by Sheikh Mohammad Al Hajj Hassan and is opposed to the alleged political hegemony of Hezbollah and the Amal Movement on the Shi'ite community in Lebanon. It also opposed the intervention of Hezbollah in Syrian civil war.

== See also ==
- List of Islamic political parties
