= Isaac Armalet =

Isaac Armalet (Syriac: ܐܝܣܚܩ ܒܪ ܐܪܡܠܬܐ ʼIsḥoq Bar ʼArmalto) (6 March 1879 – 2 September 1954), was a Syriac Catholic prolific scholar, historian, and scribe.

== Life ==
Isaac Armalet was born in Mardin and joined the Charfet Monastery in Lebanon at the age of 16. He was ordained a priest in 1903 and later became close to the Syriac Catholic Patriarchs Ephrem Rahmani and Gabriel Tappuni.

Armalet was arrested during the First World War by the Ottoman Army, but was later released. During the war he stayed in Mardin, where he witnessed the Assyrian genocide, which he describes in his book The Utmost of Christian Calamities.

He spent the rest of his life in the Charfet Monastery, Lebanon, where he wrote and copied a large number of manuscripts in Syriac and Arabic.

Armalet died on 2 September 1954 in Beirut.
