= Take Back Parliament - Lebanon =

Take Back Parliament 2013 - Lebanon 2013 إسترجعوا البرلمان
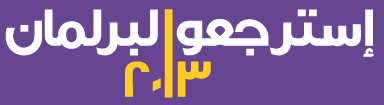
- Founded: 2012
- Headquarters: Beirut, Lebanon
- Ideology: Democracy Secularism; Social Justice anti-Feudalism Direct Democracy
- Colours: Purple, white and yellow

Website
- www.vote2013.org

Take Back Parliament – Lebanon (Arabic: إسترجعوا البرلمان), (TBP – Lebanon) is a political movement launched by several Lebanese activists who met through various social organizations and civil initiatives. Social media has played a significant role in helping to expand the group. The grassroots campaign was created as an alternative to the gridlock between the two existing political alliances in Lebanon, the March 8 Alliance and March 14 Alliance. The group members crowd-sourced to build an electoral platform which is the ideal political agenda they would like to see candidates represent. The political agenda calls for a democratic secular nonsectarian government, bringing social justice awareness, and an eventual end to corruption.

== Values ==
- Practice that reflects principles: TBP strives to reflect its values in its internal organizing.
- Zero budget: TBP did not hire any staff; the endeavor is completely dependent on volunteers.
- Transparency: TBP asks for donations only to pay necessary fees and bills and has pledged to make its accounts and spendings transparent.
- Direct democracy: TBP promotes direct democracy as its internal way of organizing and as a viable democratic system for Lebanon.
- Accountability: The campaign is built on open, honest, and friendly accountability mechanisms of individuals, groups, and decisions within the group.
- Grassroots organizing: TBP members believe in a bottom-up approach to political change in Lebanon. They did not seek mainstream media campaigns and have announced knocking on doors and taking the time to speak to people individually.
- Faith in the impossible: TBP members admit that their project might seem impossible but say that they have trust in the power of the people.

== Agenda ==
TBP was created to challenge what it calls the total inefficiency of the current and previous Lebanese parliaments and their disconnect from the daily lives of citizens. TBP members crowd-sourced and contacted various experts and NGOs to build agenda papers regarding the following issues:

Governance (8)	Human rights (5)	Public services (5)	Spatial planning (5)	Economy (4)	Environment (4)	Security & foreign policy (3)	Culture (3)	Media (2)
Corruption	Women's Rights	Education	Public Spaces & Property	Economy	Environmental Issues	Security	Tourism	Media Laws
Electoral system	Rights of People with Disabilities	Healthcare	Urban Planning	Budget and Taxation	Waste Management	Foreign Policy	National Dialogue and Conflict Resolution	ICT Reform and Online Freedom
Parliament	Workers and Migrant Workers' Rights	Public Transport	Traffic Laws	Agriculture Sector	Fishing and Hunting Laws	Boycott of Israel	Civil War Memory and Amnesty Law	
Secularism	Children's rights	Electricity	Lebanese heritage	Sustainable development	Animal rights			
Civil law	Sexual rights	Water	Rent law					
Personal status law	Prisoners' rights							
Judicial system
Administration & municipalities

Some of these papers are already available on the TBP website and the rest is expected to be made available by the end of April 2013.
