= Elie Mahfoud =

Lebanese politician

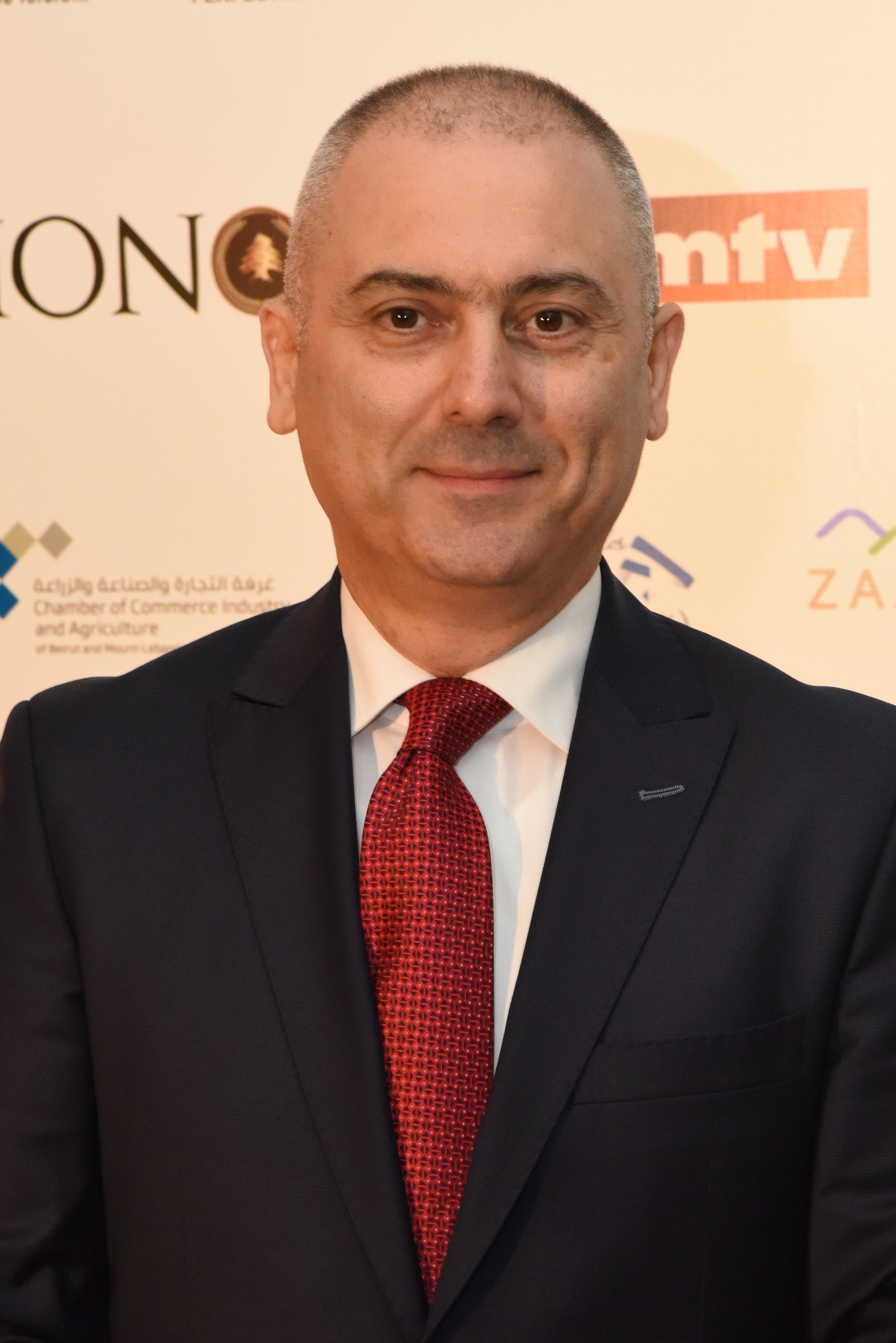
- Born: 14 March 1968 (age 58); Andaket, Akkar
- Education: Political sciences, Lebanese University
- Political party: Change Movement (حركة التغـيير), March 14 Alliance, Lebanese Forces.

Elie Mahfoud (Arabic: ايلي محفوض; born 14 March 1968 in Beirut) is a Lebanese lawyer, author, politician, head of the Change Movement (حركة التغـيير) and a member of the secretary-general of the 14 March alliance which he belongs to since October 2006, before which he used to be an FPM official since 1987. He is close to the Lebanese Forces.

== Biography ==
He was born in Beirut on 14 March 1968, to a Christian family from the town of Andaket in Akkar, North Lebanon. He is married to Maria Abu Shakra and they have two sons, Michel and Marc.

He grew up with his family in Furn El Chebbak. He received his primary education at the Frère College, and then moved to the Mont La Salle College in Ain Saadeh, he then joined the Faculty of Law and Political Sciences at the Lebanese University and obtained a Bachelor of Laws, then joined in 1993 the Beirut Bar Association as a graduated lawyer in Reda Al-Khazen's office.

He was mentored by Said Akl and in 1985 founded the Change Movement, which registered as a Lebanese party on 29 December 2010. Mahfoud belongs to the Maronite politics and considers the Lebanese Forces and its leader Samir Geagea the closest to him, also opposes the Michel Aoun's Free Patriotic Movement.

During the civil war period from 1986 to 1989, he volunteered in the Red Cross as a paramedic. He participated rescue operations in military battles of Jbaa and Jarjoa, which It was between Hezbollah and the Amal Movement.

He has published hundreds of articles in many Lebanese newspapers, and has thousands of positions, statements, statements, television and radio interviews and in the written press. He also published a number of political books like: "We and the Cause", "From the Phoenicians to the Aounists", "Otherwise Lebanon Would End", "The Deception of theCentury", "With Thirty pieces of Silver".
