= Ali Eid =

Lebanese politician

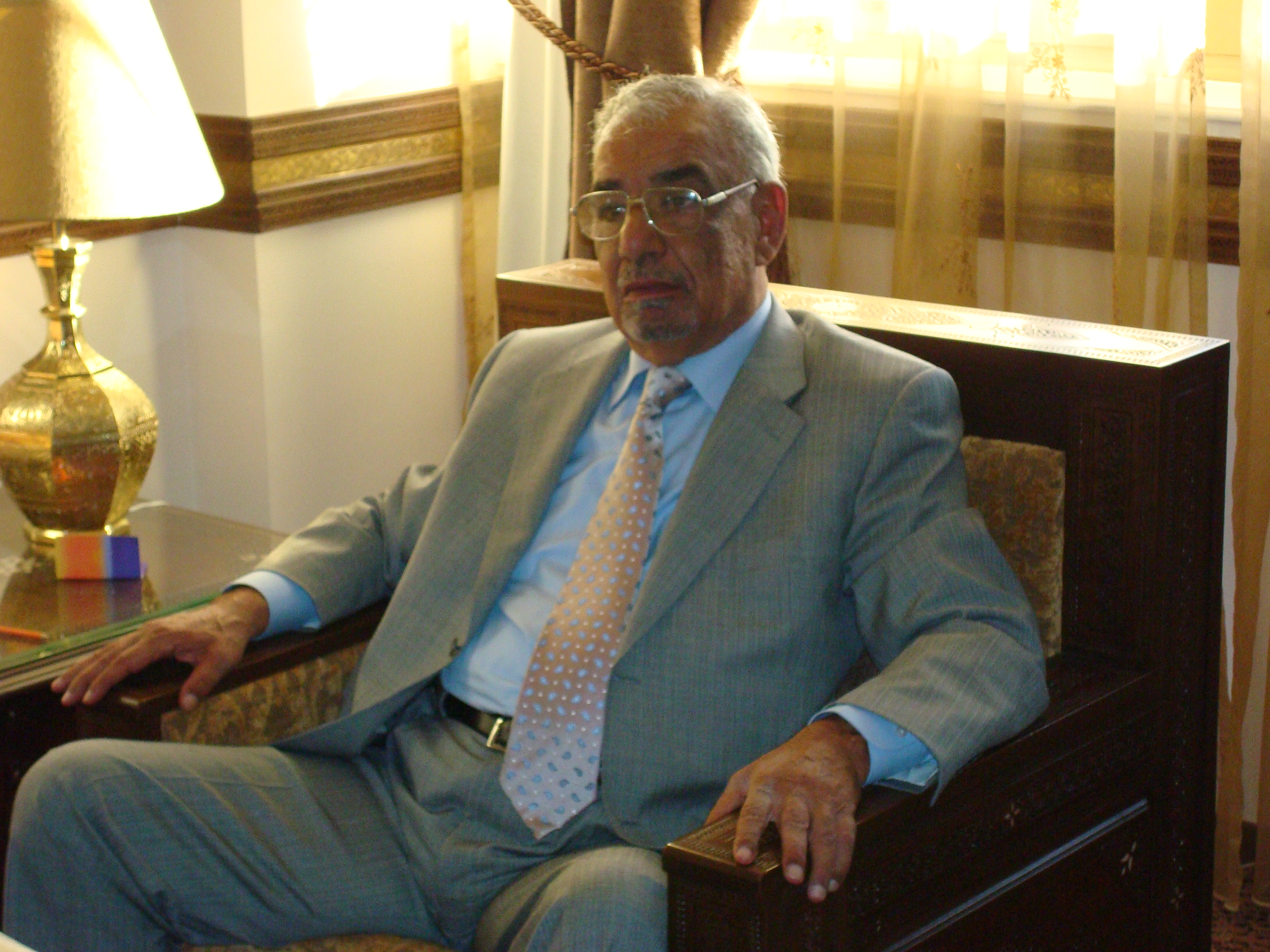
- Ali Eid at the presidential suite of the Sheraton Hotel - Damascus 2008

General Secretary of the Arab Democratic Party
- In office 1972–2015
- Preceded by: Position established
- Succeeded by: Rifaat Eid

Personal details
- Born: 14 July 1940 Tripoli, Lebanon
- Died: 25 December 2015 (aged 75) Damascus, Syria
- Party: Arab Democratic Party
- Spouse: Fatat Marouch
- Children: Youssef, Alissar, Rifaat Eid, Zoulficar (born 1978, died in 1989), Noureddine, Mohsen, Lubna, Issa, Zoulficar (born 1990)
- Education: PSPA at American University of Beirut
- Profession: Politician

Ali Eid (14 July 1940 – 25 December 2015) was a Lebanese politician. He was the leader of the Alawite community in Lebanon. He founded the Arab Democratic Party in 1972 and until his death served as General Secretary of the Arab Democratic Party.

== Early life ==
Ali Eid was born in Tabbaneh, Tripoli, Lebanon. The eldest son of Youssef Eid, a wheat dealer and his wife Amoun Eid. He began his studies at Tripoli Boys School (TBS), also known as the American School in Tripoli. In the summer he would study at the place of Sheikh Khoder in Tabbaneh, he always excelled in his studies coming first in his class.

== Political career ==
In 1960 Ali Eid decided to continue his studies in United States of America, majoring in Biochemistry. Ali Eid returned to Lebanon in 1960, and attended the American University of Beirut (AUB) and majored in Political Science & Public Administration (PSPA). During his studies and time in Beirut, he discovered that the political structure of the Lebanese system deprived the people of his religious sect, Alawites, of their rights.

In 1972 Ali Eid began his political life after he founded (The Alawite Youth Movement), and his alliance with the late Syrian President Hafez al-Assad. In 1977 Ali Eid and a group of friends founded The Front Opposing Patriotism party. Its founders were Souhale Hamadah (General Secretary) Ali Eid as (Vice president), Rashid Al-Mukadim, George Mourani, and Nasib Al-Khatib. In 1982 The Front Opposing Patriotism was resolved and The Arabic Democratic Party was founded with Ali Eid being the general secretary. In 1989 he was hit by a catastrophe, the death of his son Zoulficar due to an unexploded bomb from the Lebanese civil war.

Ali Eid was appointed to newly established Alawite seat in the Lebanese Parliament in 1991 as a deputy, which was created following the Taif Agreement.

He was the general secretary of the Arab Democratic Party in Lebanon, and though he and his party were pro-Syrian during the Lebanese Civil War, he and other Lebanese Alawites have since become more neutral due to the involvement of the Syrians in him losing the Alawite Parliament Seat to the late Alawite Deputy Ahmad Habous in 1996.

In March 2015, Eid's brother Bader was assassinated in the village of Kuweikhat in Akkar.

== Death ==
On 25 December 2015, it was announced that Eid had died in Damascus, Syria at the age of 75.
