= Emile Rahme =

Lebanese politician

Emile Rahme (Arabic: إميل رحمة) is a Maronite Lebanese ex-member of parliament representing the Baalbeck-Hermil district between 2009–2018. He is the leader of the Solidarity Party and is part of Sleiman Frangieh's Marada bloc also called Free and Unified Lebanon Bloc. He was elected for the first time in 2009.

== Biography ==
Emile Georges Rahme was born on March 1, 1952, in Deir el Ahmar. Rahme attended the Sharkieh School in Zahlé where he was aspired to follow his degree studying Private Law at the Lebanese University. Rahme did not wait long to start with his political and reform career. During his last university year 1975, he was found presiding "Harakat Al Wa'ai" (The Awakening Movement) a student movement, calling for student rights and equality. After about 10 years, Rahme seeks enhanced change and higher quality reform expansion forming "Hizb el-Tadamon" (Solidarity Party) year 1985.

In the year 1986, the role of Rahme becomes vivid in the Lebanese Forces when he headed the Justice Department. His service continues where he defended the leader of the Lebanese Forces, Samir Geagea, and Fouad Malik year 1994 when they were prosecuted.

Moreover, throughout those years, Rahme's dedication for his society was not put aside. Year 1982, Rahme attended the Christian Democrat International in the Belgian and Italian Parliaments. In 1986, up until now, Rahme acts as an active member in the Maronite Union. Furthermore, he attended International Maronite Congresses in New York year 1980, in Canada year 1985, in Los Angeles years 1994 and 2002. In addition to all that, Rahme is an active member and spokesperson of the Follow-up Committee for the "National Christian Union" (اللقاء الوطني المسيحي) since 2008. Finally, in 2003, Rahme was elected by the Lebanese Parties as the coordinator for the Palestinian "Right of Return" and "Objection Against Resettlement".

After an unsuccessful attempt year 2000 to enter the Lebanese Parliament, he was elected member of the parliament for the Maronite seat of Baalbek-El Hermel district with 109,060 votes on June 7, 2009. His score was the highest amongst all elected members of the parliament in Lebanon.

In 2018, he lost his seat to the Lebanese Forces candidate Antoine Habchi.

== See also ==
- Lebanese Parliament
- Members of the 2009-2013 Lebanese Parliament
