= Arab Democratic Party (Lebanon) =

Lebanese political party

Arab Democratic Party الحزب العربي الديمقراطي
- Abbreviation: ADP
- Leader: Rifaat Eid
- Founder: Ali Eid
- Founded: 1974; 52 years ago
- Headquarters: Tripoli
- Ideology: Arab nationalism Neo-Ba'athism; Pan-Syrianism
- Political position: Left-wing
- National affiliation: March 8 Alliance
- Parliament of Lebanon: 0 / 128
- Cabinet of Lebanon: 0 / 30

Party flag

The Arab Democratic Party (ADP) (Arabic: الحزب العربي الديمقراطي, romanized: Al-Hizb Al-'Arabi Al-Dimuqrati) is a Lebanese political party, based in Tripoli, in the North Lebanon Governorate. Its current leader is Rifaat Eid.

== Origins ==
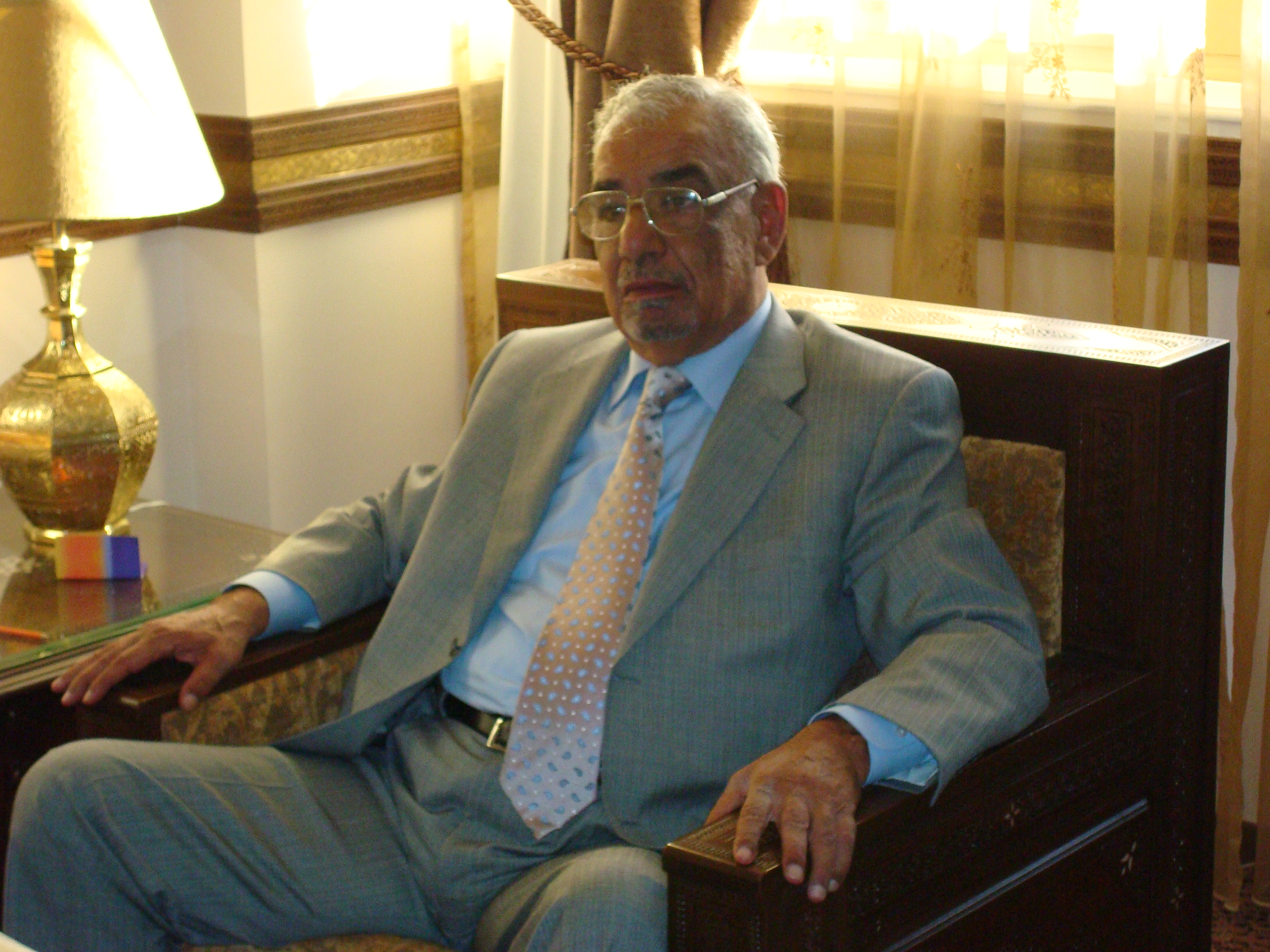
Ali Eid in 2008

The ADP traced back its origins to an earlier leftist students' organization called the Alawite Youth Movement (AYM) (Arabic: حركة الشباب العلوي | Harakat al-Shabab al-Alawiyya) or Mouvement de la Jeunesse Alaouite (MJA) in French, originally formed in 1972 at Tripoli by Ali Eid, a former teacher. As its name implies, the AYM drew its support from the Shia Alawite minority sect of Lebanon, even receiving the personal backing of Rifa'at al-Assad, Syria's vice-president at the time and himself a member of that sect. During the early war years, the AYM kept itself outside the LNM-PLO alliance, but in 1977–78 the movement joined the Patriotic Opposition Front (POF) (Arabic: جبهة المعارضة الوطنية | Jabhat al-Muearadat al-Wataniyya), a pro-Syrian multiconfessional coalition of Lebanese notables and activists founded in Tripoli by the MP Talal El-Merhebi (elected in 1972), Souhale Hamadah, Rashid Al-Muadim, George Mourani, and Nassib Al-Khatib, with Ali Eid being elected vice-president of the new formation.

However, internal disagreements soon led to the dissolution of the alliance at the early 1980s, when Eid and some of its ex-coalition partners went to form in 1982 the ADP, choosing the Sunni Muslim lawyer Nassib Al-Khatib as their first secretary-general, later replaced by Ali Eid in 1985. In the process, the AYM was absorbed into the new party and became its youth branch.

== The ADP in the civil war 1982–1990 ==
A pro-Syrian force which received support from the Syrian government, the ADP and its Red Knights' battled several Tripoli-based factions hostile to Damascus' presence in Lebanon, in particular the Sunni Islamic Unification Movement – IUM (Arabic: التوحيد, romanized: al-Tawhid) since 1981–82, which they suppressed with the help of the Syrian Army, the pro-Syrian Syrian Social Nationalist Party (SSNP) and Ba'ath Party factions and the Lebanese Communist Party (LCP) in 1985–86.

The ADP/ARK also joined the LNRF (Jammoul) guerrilla alliance in September 1982 to fight the Israeli occupation of southern Lebanon and later its successor, the wider Syrian-sponsored Lebanese National Salvation Front (LNSF) in July 1983 against the American-backed government of President Amin Gemayel. In 1988–1990 they accepted the Taif Agreement and supported the parliament-based provisional government of Selim al-Hoss against General Michel Aoun's military interim government.

=== Military structure and organization ===
Arab Red Knights الفرسان الحمر العربي
- Leader: Ali Eid
- Dates active: 1981-1991
- Headquarters: Jabal Mohsen (Tripoli)
- Active regions: Tripoli, Northern Lebanon
- Size: 1,000 fighters
- Part of: Lebanese National Resistance Front
- Wars: Lebanese Civil War

The ADP raised in July 1981 with Syrian support its own militia, the Arab Red Knights – ARK (Arabic: الفرسان الحمر العربي, romanized: Al-Fursan al-Hammur al-Arabi) or Red Knights for short. Trained by Rifa'at's Defense Companies, they were also known as the 'Pink Panthers' due to their green- and raspberry-colored lizard camouflage uniforms. Commanded by Ali Eid the ARK initially aligned just 500 militiamen, but subsequently grew to 1,000 well-armed male and female fighters, organized into infantry, signals, medical and Military Police 'branches', plus a motorized corps made of gun trucks and 'technicals'. The latter consisted of UAZ-469 light utility vehicles, Jeep CJ-5 and Jeep CJ-8 (civilian versions of the Willys M38A1 MD jeep), Santana 88 Ligero Militar jeeps, Land-Rover series II-III and Toyota Land Cruiser (J40) light pickups equipped with heavy machine-guns, recoilless rifles and Anti-Aircraft autocannons. The ADP/ARK operated mainly in Northern Lebanon, with its main stronghold in the adjacent Alawite-populated Jabal Mohsen, a sub-urban strategic high ground area overlooking the whole city of Tripoli though they also claimed to control some of the Alawite villages of the Akkar District right up to the Lebanese-Syrian border.

== Illegal activities and controversy ==
By the mid-1980s, allied with the Lebanese Communist Party (LCP) Popular Guards' militia, the Red Knights also controlled the city's commercial harbour and oil refinery – the second largest deep-waters port of Lebanon – in collusion with the director of Tripoli's harbour Ahmad Karami and corrupt Syrian Army officers. The National Fuel Company (NFC) headed jointly by businessmen Maan Karami (brother of late prime-minister Rachid Karami) and Haj Muhammad Awadah, run in the behalf of the ADP and LCP a profitable fuel smuggling ring that stretched to the Beqaa Valley.

== The post-war years ==
After the end of the civil strife in October 1990, the ADP was disarmed and its leader Ali Eid was elected in 1991 to the newly established Alawite seat in the Lebanese Parliament. Prior to this, no Alawite had been elected to the Lebanese parliament. The Party seems to have revised its traditional pro-Syrian stance in the 1990s, in favour of a moderate, cautious neutralist posture in the current sphere of Lebanon's internal politics.

In 2005 it was rumoured that Rifa'at al-Assad was reviving the Red Knights militia in Tripoli. It rearmed during the 2007 Lebanon conflict, after it was revealed that the Islamist group Fatah al-Islam had planned to attack the Alawites of Tripoli. It was active during the 2008 Lebanon conflict, now led by Ali Eid's son Rifaat, being between 1,000 and 2,000 men strong. During the 2008 conflict, where Sunnis and Shias fought throughout Lebanon, Rifaat said in an interview: "We're the most convenient targets, the stand-in for Hezbollah, our problem can only be solved when the Shiites and Sunnis solve theirs." As many as 9,000 Alawites fled their homes during the conflict. Despite years of operating freely a militia throughout Tripoli, the Lebanese Army later severely cracked down on the ADP's military wing starting in April 2014. This forced most militants to surrender to the Internal Security Forces (ISF) and led the group's leaders/commanders to flee in order to avoid the possibility of life in prison.

== Syrian Civil War ==
During the Syrian civil war, spillover from that conflict has led to further tensions between the ADP and neighbouring Sunni IUM militants.

On 29 March 2014, Rifaat and Ali Eid Left Lebanon to Syria.

And on April 10, 2014, the Lebanese Military Investigative Judge Riyad Abu Ghayda issued an arrest warrant in absentia for the pro-Assad figure Rifaat Eid and 11 of his associates over their alleged involvement in clashes on the northern city of Tripoli. Abu Ghayda's warrants are based on articles in the Penal Code that could lead to the death penalty.

== See also ==
- Lebanese Civil War
- List of extrajudicial killings and political violence in Lebanon
- List of armed groups in the Syrian Civil War
- List of weapons of the Lebanese Civil War
- Popular Guard
- 2nd Infantry Brigade (Lebanon)

== Bibliography ==
- Antoine J. Abraham, The Lebanon war, Greenwood Publishing Group, Westport, Connecticut 1996. ISBN 9780275953898, 0275953890
- CIA Lebanon report, Directory of Libanese Militias – A Reference Aid, NESA 84-10171C, June 1984, pp. 6–7. Declassified in Part – Sanitized Copy Approved for Release 2009/06/16: CIA-RDP85T00314R000100070001-4. –
- Denise Ammoun, Histoire du Liban contemporain: Tome 2 1943–1990, Fayard, Paris 2005. ISBN 978-2-213-61521-9 (in French) –
- Edgar O'Ballance, Civil War in Lebanon, 1975–92, Palgrave Macmillan, London 1998. ISBN 0-333-72975-7
- Fawwaz Traboulsi, Identités et solidarités croisées dans les conflits du Liban contemporain; Chapitre 12: L'économie politique des milices: le phénomène mafieux, Thèse de Doctorat d'Histoire – 1993, Université de Paris VIII, 2007. (in French) –
- Fawwaz Traboulsi, A History of Modern Lebanon: Second Edition, Pluto Press, London 2012. ISBN 978-0745332741
- Leigh Neville, Technicals: Non-Standard Tactical Vehicles from the Great Toyota War to modern Special Forces, New Vanguard series 257, Osprey Publishing Ltd, Oxford 2018. ISBN 9781472822512
- Rex Brynen, Sanctuary and Survival: the PLO in Lebanon, Boulder: Westview Press, Oxford 1990. ISBN 0 86187 123 5 –
- Robert Fisk, Pity the Nation: Lebanon at War, London: Oxford University Press, (3rd ed. 2001). ISBN 0-19-280130-9 –
- Moustafa El-Assad, Civil Wars Volume 1: The Gun Trucks, Blue Steel books, Sidon 2008. ISBN 9953-0-1256-8
- Samer Kassis, 30 Years of Military Vehicles in Lebanon, Beirut: Elite Group, 2003. ISBN 9953-0-0705-5
- Samir Makdisi and Richard Sadaka, The Lebanese Civil War, 1975–1990, American University of Beirut, Institute of Financial Economics, Lecture and Working Paper Series (2003 No.3), pp. 1–53. –
- Tom Najem and Roy C. Amore, Historical Dictionary of Lebanon, Second Edition, Historical Dictionaries of Asia, Oceania, and the Middle East, Rowman & Littlefield Publishers, Lanham, Boulder, New York & London 2021. ISBN 9781538120439, 1538120437
- William W. Harris, Faces of Lebanon: Sects, Wars, and Global Extensions, Princeton Series on the Middle East, Markus Wiener Publishers, Princeton, New Jersey, 1997. ISBN 978-1558761155, 1-55876-115-2
