= Fathi Yakan =

Islamic cleric

- فتحي يكن

Personal life
- Born: Fathi Mohamed Anaya; February 9, 1933 Tripoli, Lebanon
- Died: June 13, 2009 (aged 76)
- Spouse: Mona Haddad
- Political party: Islamic Labor Front
- Occupation: Islamic cleric, and politician

Religious life
- Religion: Islam

Fathi Yakan (born Fathi Mohamed Anaya; Arabic: فتحي محمد عناية; Turkish: Fethî Yeken, February 9, 1933 – June 13, 2009) was an Islamic cleric who held a seat in the parliament of Lebanon in 1992. He was born in Tripoli.

== Life ==
He was among the pioneers of the Islamic movement in the 1950s and the head of the Islamic Action Front (Lebanon). He is regarded as Islamic Group (Al Jemaah Islamiyah)'s grandfather and leading ideologue.

He initiated a political effort between Prime Minister Fouad Siniora and his allies on the one hand and the opposition in a bid to end the rule crisis in the wake of the 2006 Israeli war on Lebanon.

Sheikh Yakan was married to Mona Haddad with whom he had established a private Islamic university, Jinan University (Lebanon). He has four daughters and a son. He has authored more than 35 books, some of which were translated into many languages. Yakan died on June 13, 2009, after he was admitted to the Hotel Dieu Hospital a day earlier.

== See also ==
- 2006–2007 Lebanese political protests

== Books ==
- Fathi Yakan, To Be A Muslim
