= Islamic Group of Lebanon =

Sunni Islamist political party in Lebanon

Islamic Group of Lebanon الجماعة الإسلامية في لبنان
- Abbreviation: IGL
- Leader: Muhammad Taqqush
- Founder: Faysal Mawlawi and Fathi Yakan
- Founded: 1964; 62 years ago
- Headquarters: Beirut
- Armed wing: Al-Fajr Forces
- Ideology: Sunni Islamism; Pan-Islamism; Social conservatism Anti-Zionism
- Political position: Far-right
- Religion: Sunni Islam
- International affiliation: Muslim Brotherhood
- Designated as a terrorist group by: Argentina; United States
- Parliament of Lebanon: 1 / 128

Party flag
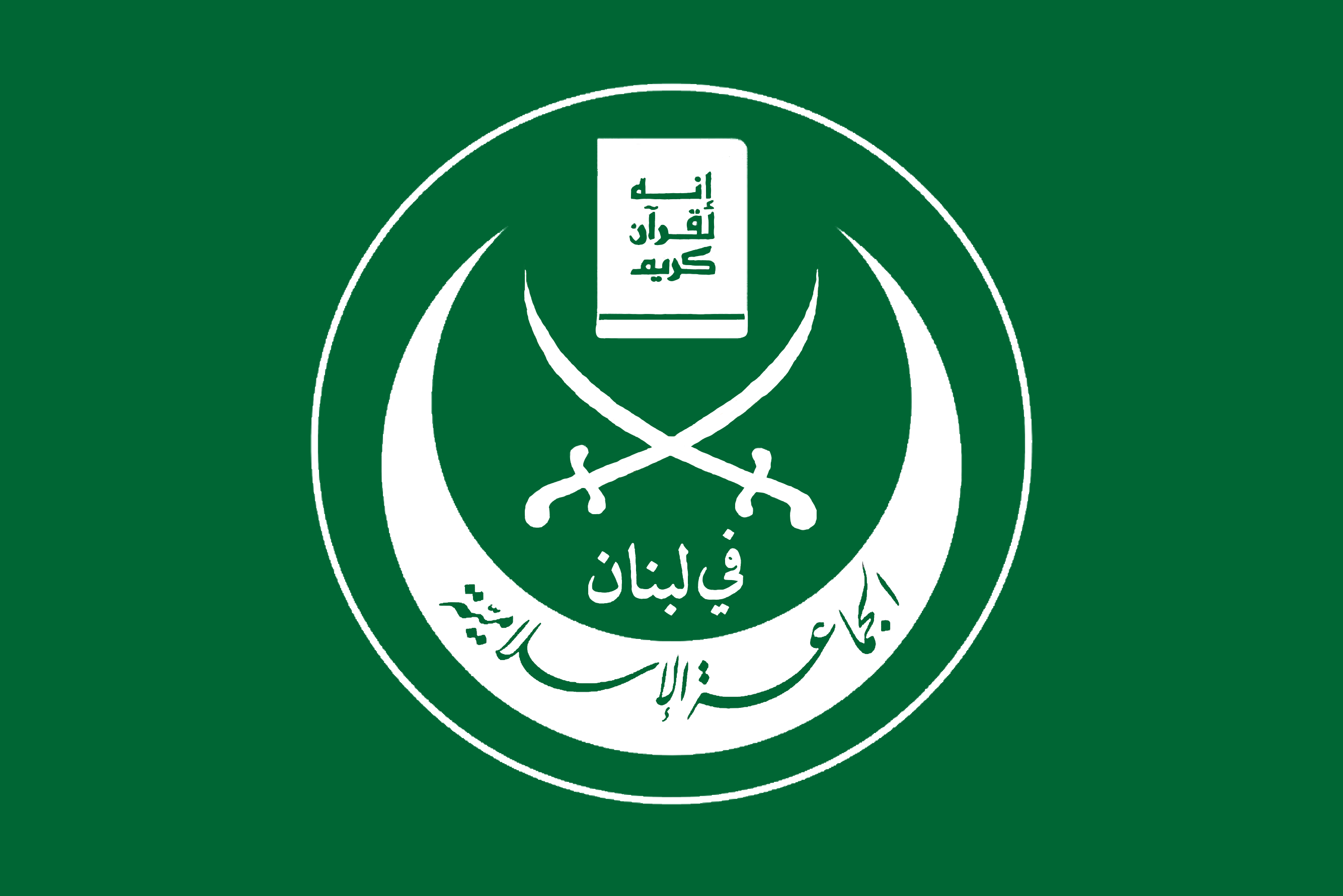

Website
- al-jamaa.org

The Islamic Group of Lebanon (Arabic: الجماعة الإسلامية في لبنان, romanized: al-Jamāʿa al-Islāmīyya fī Lubnān) is a Sunni Islamist political party and militant organization in Lebanon. It was founded in 1964 as the Lebanese branch of the Muslim Brotherhood. In fact, it was established by young members of Ibad al-Rahman (or the Worshipers of the Merciful). Its origins, as documented by Nizar Hamzeh, go back to the height of Gamal Abdel Nasser's efforts at Arab unity in the mid-1960s.

It supports the idea of establishing a legal order in Lebanon that is based on Islamic shari'a. As a local branch it closely follows the doctrines of the Muslim Brotherhood. Fathi Yakan was the group's grandfather and main ideologue who is a veteran Islamist scholar and preacher from Tripoli.

Its ex-leader is Ibrahim al-Masri, who succeeded its former leader Faisal Mawlawi due to the latter's illness. It entered the 2009 Lebanese general election beside the Future Movement in Beirut's 3rd electoral district. Currently they have 1 seat in the Lebanese Parliament.

Under the leadership of Muhammad Taqqush, the Islamic Group of Lebanon joined the Lebanon–Israel conflict by launching missiles into Israel in November 2023. Since then, the Islamic Group of Lebanon has fought alongside Hezbollah and allies in the 2024 Lebanon war and 2026 Lebanon war. Taqqush survived at least two assassination attempts during the conflict.

== Military history ==
Al-Fajr Forces

The Islamic Group's armed wing, dubbed the Al-Fajr Forces (Arabic: قوات الفجر), launched missiles into Israel during the 2023 Israel-Lebanon border clashes, in what The National called a "resurgence... after almost 20 years of relative inactivity."

On 10 March 2024, three members of the Islamic Group were killed after an Israeli strike on the town of Aqroub. On April 26, an Israeli drone strike on a car in Meidoun killed two Islamic Group members, including senior commander Mosab Khalaf. On 18 July 2024, an IDF strike on a car in Ghazzeh, eastern Lebanon killed Mohammad Hamed Gebara, an Islamic Group commander who planned and conducted attacks in collaboration with Hamas. Commander Hussein Atoui was assassinated in Damour during an Israeli airstrike against a vehicle in April 2025.

In 2026, IDF targeted Islamic Group of Lebanon's headquarters.

== Media ==
In 2008, members of the Islamic Group initiated the Al-Fajr Radio, which offers educational religious programs. It is equally shared by multiple members of the party.

== Relationship with other groups ==
=== Hezbollah ===
Bassem Hammoud, the deputy head of the Islamic Group's political bureau, clarified that his party was "not in complete alignment with Hezbollah... [b]ut we are with them in terms of resistance against Israel." Secretary-General Muhammad Taqqush characterized relations with Hezbollah as “good and growing”.

=== Hamas ===
Taqqush has praised Hamas as a "honourable liberation movement" and lauded the group's ties with them.
