= 2001 Lebanon Protest (7 August) =

In 7 August 2001 (Arabic:مظاهرات ٧ آب ٢٠٠١ في لبنان) an Anti-Syrian occupation demonstration took place in Lebanon, which turned violent when the joint Lebanese-Syrian security system attempted to repress it, which resulted in the arrest of hundreds, which sparked controversy over its legal justification, and that is during the tenure of the pro-Syrian president Emile Lahoud. On that day, the security forces attacked hundreds of young activists, mainly from the Christian parties, including the Free Patriotic Movement, the National Liberal Party and other non-partisan neutral activists in front of the Justice Palace in Beirut and engaged in a campaign of beatings and arrests that was characterized by extreme ferocity.

This day is considered a turning point in the history of Lebanon when the resistance against the Syrian presence in Lebanon has started, and climaxed in the 2005 Cedar Revolution which led to the complete Syrian withdrawal in 2005.

== History ==
By the end of the Lebanese Civil War in 1990's, the Christians felt defeated, especially after the occupation done by Syria, and their leaders Michel Aoun ending up exiled and Samir Geagea imprisoned.

In 2000, Christian-Maronite Patriarch Nassrallah Boutros Sfeir campaigned in Mount Lebanon for the reconciliation of Christians and Druze, after a dispute that goes back to the civil war, which is believed to have inspired the 7 August 2001 revolt. Moreover, the withdrawal of Israel from the South of Lebanon in 2000 had encouraged even more the total independence from the Syrians.

On the day of the 7 August 2001, the Lebanese security forces arrested hundreds of people who were demonstrating for freedom of expression and against the Syrian regime, and put them in prison without any arrest warrants or legal justifications.

In 2005, the assassination of the prime minister Rafik Hariri led to a massive Cedar Revolution which resulted in the total withdrawal of the Syrian troops from Lebanon on April 30, 2005.
