= Pax Syriana =

Historiographical term

Pax Syriana (Lat., "Syrian Peace") is a historiographical term, modeled after the original phrase Pax Romana, used in the study of international relations in Western Asia, usually pertaining to efforts by Syria to influence its neighbors, particularly Lebanon. The idea behind Pax Syriana is that Syria (as it existed during the Ottoman Empire and as it was later partitioned into), through diplomacy and military strength, could secure a role for the United States by its being a necessary ally to ensure peace in Lebanon.

== Later references ==
A later 1976 reference was published in Time magazine in 1976, referring to Syrian efforts to impose a truce during the early years of the Lebanese Civil War. It has recently been used to refer to the period between 1990 and 2005 when there was reduced conflict within Lebanon, usually attributed to Syrian hegemony and military domination in the region. It may be used with emphasis on the relative calm following suppression of the Lebanese Civil War, or on suggestions of Syria's having intentions for annexing or otherwise pacifying Lebanon.

=== Syrian Lebanese war, 1976 ===
On 4 July 1986, Syrian troops entered West Beirut for the first time since being expelled during the 1982 Israeli invasion. Approximately 500 Syrian troops, working with the Lebanese Army and police, cleared roadblocks, closed militia offices, and collected weapons. In mid-February 1987, however, a new round of fighting broke out in West Beirut, this time between Druze and Shia militias, both of which were regarded as Syrian allies. The combat was described by witnesses as being of unrivaled intensity in twelve years of war, with the militiamen using formations of Soviet-made T-54 tanks that Syria had supplied to both sides. Five days of combat caused an estimated 700 casualties and set much of West Beirut aflame.

Syria acted decisively to stop the chaos in West Beirut, and it seized the opportunity to reimpose its hegemony over the areas in Lebanon from which it had been evicted by Israel in 1982. On 22 February 1987, it dispatched 7,500 troops, configured in two brigades and a battalion, from eastern Lebanon. The Syrian troops, most of whom were veteran commandos, closed down some seventy militia offices, rounded up and arrested militia leaders, confiscated arms caches, deployed troops along the major roads and at Beirut International Airport, established checkpoints, and sent squads on patrol in the streets.

The Syrian Army did not shy away from violence in its effort to restore order to the Lebanese capital. In the first two days of its police operation, Syrian troops shot some fifteen Lebanese of various militias. Then on 24 February a dozen trucks full of Syrian commandos entered the Basta neighborhood, a Shia stronghold, and attacked the Fathallah barracks, the headquarters of the Hezbollah organization. There, Syrian troops killed eighteen Hezbollah militants.

In mid-April the Syrian Army deployed troops south of Beirut. Approximately 100 Syrian commandos, fighting alongside soldiers of the Lebanese Army's Sixth Brigade, occupied key positions along the strategic coastal highway linking Beirut with southern Lebanon and took control of the bridge over the Awali River, near Sidon.

By mid-1987 the Syrian Army appeared to have settled into Beirut for a protracted stay. Lebanon's anomie was regarded by Syrian officials as an unacceptable risk to Syrian security. The government of Syria appeared prepared to occupy Beirut permanently, if necessary. The senior Syrian military commander in Lebanon, Brigadier General Ghazi Kanaan, said that militia rule of Lebanon had ended and that the Syrian intervention was "open-ended," implying that Syria would occupy West Beirut indefinitely. Meanwhile, Syrian officials indicated that thousands of additional Syrian troops would probably be sent to Beirut to ensure stability. Kanaan declared that Syria would take full responsibility for the security of foreign embassies in West Beirut, and he invited foreign missions to return. Kanaan also promised that Syria would expend all possible efforts to secure the release of Western hostages held by Lebanese terrorists.

== Other usage ==
The name of the 2005 film Syriana was apparently inspired by Pax Syriana and the term Syriana as used by Washington thinktanks as per former CIA operative Robert Baer. According to the film's publicity materials, "Syriana" was "a very real term used by Washington think-tanks to describe a hypothetical reshaping of the Middle East." In an online discussion with The Washington Post in November 2005, Syriana director Stephen Gaghan said he saw Syriana as "a great word that could stand for man's perpetual hope of remaking any geographic region to suit his own needs."

== See also ==
- History of Syria
- History of Lebanon
- UN Security Council Resolution 1559
- Syria Accountability and Lebanese Sovereignty Restoration Act
- Syrian occupation of Lebanon
- Petroleum politics
