= Fuad Nasr al-Din =

Egyptian writer, novelists, and critic

Fouad Naserldin
- Born: January 15, 1950; Alexandria, Egypt
- Died: October 21, 2016 (aged 66); Cairo, Egypt
- Occupations: Writer and novelist

Fuad Nasr al-Din (Arabic:فؤاد نصر الدين; January 15, 1950 – October 21, 2016) was an Egyptian writer, novelist, and critic. During his life, al-Din published 18 works in novels, short stories, and literary criticism. He launched a competition in his name to encourage short story writers in Egypt and the Arab world.

== Career ==
Fuad Nasr al-Din was an Egyptian writer, critic, and novelist with nearly 18 publications, including novels, stories, and critiques. He was supervising the literature page for the Tahya Misr newspaper. He created the group ''The Very Short Story in the Narrative Lab'' on July 3, 2013. By December 2014, 25,600 members were passionate about 'The Very Short Story.' Thousands of short stories were published. The members’ stories were transformed from dream to reality by printing and publishing them in books that included the names of more than one hundred and twenty writers and nearly a thousand stories in eight successive publications.

al-Din loved literary writing from childhood and was encouraged to write short stories by his language teacher. During his primary education, his passion for reading in the school library caught the school librarian's attention, who gave him money to spend on storybooks.

In high school, Din started publishing his stories in local magazines. He later published his first story in Al-Jadeed magazine, carrying the title ''The Scream.'' He published his first collection of short stories in 1982 entitled ''A Tattoo on a Woman's Chest,'' which was well received. The Al-Qisa Magazine and the Al-Masaa Newspaper both mentioned the collection. Four years later, Din published his second collection in 1986 entitled ''Traveling to Faraway Countries.''

== Awards ==
al-Din created a prize in his name for the very short story and made sure that the competition was available to all creative writers from Egypt and the Arab world. He indicated that the contestant should participate with a hundred short stories. He added that the competition aimed to encourage creative people and the growth of the creative movement in the field of very short stories. He offered financial prizes to the winners and printed five winning works of the first-place winners.

== Works ==
His works include the following:

- Foot Incision (original title: Shaq Qadam), 2013
- Pile of Salt (original title: Kawm al- Maleh), 2009
- The Foxes (original title: Al- Thaalib), 2009
- The Seagull Does Not Like the Sea (original title: Al- Nawras La Yaashaq al- Bahr), 2006
- The Godmother (original title: Al- Arraba), 1995
- Al- Huwaiti, 1993

=== Critical Works ===
- Critical Reviews of the Saudi Story, 1993
- The Arrow and the Path (original title: Al- Sahm Wa al- Mismar), 1990
