= Tahseen Khayat =

Lebanese entrepreneur

- تحسين خياط
- Born: Tahseen Salah Khayat; October 24, 1942 (age 83); Sidon, Lebanon
- Education: American University of Beirut
- Occupation: Businessman
- Known for: Al Jadeed TV
- Spouse: Samar Asseiran
- Children: 5
- Parents: Salah Khayat (father); Mounira Fawaz (mother)

Tahseen Salah Khayat (Arabic:تحسين صلاح الخياط; born October 24, 1942; Sidon, Lebanon) is a Lebanese entrepreneur and the founder and Chairman of the Board of Directors of Al Jadeed TV station. Khayat is the chairman of Tahseen Khayat Group, which works in the fields of publishing, printing, distribution, media, energy, and pharmaceuticals.

== Early life and education ==
Khayat was born in the Qanaya neighborhood, southern Sidon, on October 24, 1942. He was born to Salah Al Khayat, a judge who was known for his justice and his vision for combating the French uprising, and Mounira Fawaz. He is the fourth son of a family consisting of Bashar, Bushra, Hassan, Adan, and Maluki.

He received his primary and middle education at the America Evangelical School in Sidon and graduated from the International College in Beirut, and then from the American University of Beirut.

== Career ==
Khayat has worked and invested in several fields including printing and publishing, media, energy, and pharmaceuticals. He is known for his pan-Arab and nationalist positions, which he expressed through the policy pursued by Al-Jadeed TV, where he served as the chairman of the board of directors since 1992.

He had prominent positions on the Lebanese–Syrian Security Apparatus, leading to his arrest after charges were fabricated against him, and his release later by the late prime minister Omar Karami.

=== Printing and publishing ===
Khayat worked as a salesman in Kuwait selling Encyclopædia Britannica books until the closure of the store he worked for. By the age of 20, he relocated to Abu Dhabi in the late sixties with a suitcase full of books. In 1969, he opened the first bookstore in Abu Dhabi under the name AllPrint on Airport Road, where he received clients including Khalifa bin Zayed Al Nahyan, the late President of the UAE, and Abdullah bin Zayed Al Nahyan. Abu Dhabi Department of Culture and Tourism recognized AllPrint as an urban treasure. He also established printing and publishing companies in several countries, including Britain and France.

=== Media work and the founding of Al-Jadeed TV ===
In 1991, Khayat began his career in media when he then bought the shares of NTV from the Lebanese Communist Party in 1992, and rebranded it to the NewTV and then to Al Jadeed TV, which is the current name of the TV station.

In 1997, the Al Jadeed station was forcibly closed as a result of Syrian intervention and parallel government repression during the rule of the late president Rafik Hariri. Then the terrestrial and satellite stations were relaunched on October 2, 2001, by a judicial ruling from the State Shura Council.

=== Political and national positions and the arrest of Khayat ===
Khayat was known for his political and patriotic stances during the period of the Syrian occupation of Lebanon. In 2002, Al Jadeed TV took over Al-Madina Bank scandal where Khayat obtained documents proving the involvement of Syrian brigadier general Rustum Ghazaleh and members of his family in withdrawing millions of dollars from the bank which led to Al-Madina Bank collapse, which resulted in the arrest of Khayat by Lebanese–Syrian Security Apparatus.

On December 7, 2003, Khayat was arrested and falsely accused of collaboration with Israel by involved personalities in Al-Madina Bank scandal where his detention lasted for one day and he was released. Khayat and Al Jadeed followed up on the Bank scandal until the recovering the depositors' money.

== Threats and assassination attempts ==
Khayat was subjected to several assassination attempts, the most prominent of which was the firing into his office, an attempt to burn down his house with all its occupants, and repeated attacks on the television building. Despite the situations he faced, he resorted every time to the judiciary and the state, refusing to communicate or bargain with any party responsible for the attack. Although the investigative investigations carried out by Al Jadeed TV's investigative agency identified the perpetrators, the judiciary was unable to arrest the perpetrators of the assassination attempts.

== Al Jadeed and Karma Khayat's accusations ==
In April 2015, Al Jadeed TV and its vice president, Karma Khayat, went on trial on charges of "knowingly and wilfully interfering with the administration of justice" after the August 2012 broadcasting of the names of alleged secret witnesses in the Hariri case. Khayat was convicted in September 2015 of failing to remove information on supposedly confidential witnesses from Al Jadeed's official website and its YouTube channel, while Al Jadeed was found not guilty. Both accused were found not guilty and Khayat was sentenced to a €10,000 fine, and on March 8, 2016, the conviction was reversed.

== Personal life and family ==
Khayat's family origins go back to Ahmed Al-Zein, who was one of those wanted on the list of those sentenced to death by the Turkish military courts during the Jamal Pasha era. Al-Zein was able to escape and fled to Syria, where he practiced tailor labor. He gained his fame from the sewing profession and was nicknamed Ahmed Al Khayat, and his nickname stuck with him after his return from Syria with his family to continue his resistance against the Turks in Lebanon.

Ahmed Khayat gave birth to Tahseen, the grandfather, who had a close relationship with Mufti Bahaa Al-Din Al-Zein, so he married the sister of Mufti Maluki. Khayat is married to Samar Osseiran and they have children Bushra, Karma, Karim, Nadia, and Ghida.
