= Tahsin =

Tahsin (also transliterated as Tahseen, Arabic: تحسین) is an Arabic word which means improve, enhance, or enrich. It is used primarily for males (97.3%) and though in some cases it is use for females (2.7%) in Arabic-speaking and Muslim countries.

== Given name ==
=== Tahseen ===
- Tahseen Bahar Shuchona, Bangladeshi politician
- Tahseen Bashir (1925–2002), Egyptian diplomat
- Tahseen Jabbary (born 1964), Dutch football coach
- Tahseen Khayat (born 1942), Lebanese entrepreneur
- Tahseen Said (1933–2019), Kurdish and Yazidi leader
- Tahseen Ullah Khan, Pakistani naval officer

=== Tahsin ===
- Tahsin Aykutalp (1926–2013), Turkish miniaturist and Tezhip teacher
- Tahsin Bekir Balta (1902–1970), Turkish politician
- Tahsin Ertuğruloğlu (born 1953), Turkish Cypriot politician
- Tahsin Gemil (born 1943), Romanian historian
- Tahsin Jamshid (born 2006), Qatari footballer
- Tahsin Özgüç (1916–2005), Turkish archaeologist
- Tahsin Pasha (1845–1930), Ottoman bureaucrat
- Tahsin Şahinkaya (1925–2015), Turkish Air Force general
- Tahsin Sultani, Afghan cricketer
- Tahsin Taha (1941–1995), Kurdish singer
- Tahsin Yazıcı (1892–1971), Turkish army officer
- Tahsin Yücel (1933–2016), Turkish writer

== Middle name ==
- Hasan Tahsin Gökcan (born 1965), Turkish judge
- Hasan Tahsin Mayatepek, Turkish diplomat
- Hasan Tahsin Pasha (1845–1918), Ottoman general
- Hasan Tahsin Uzer (1878–1939), Turkish politician
- Hazim Tahsin Beg (born 1963), Kurdish and Yazidi leader
- Muazzez Tahsin Berkand (1899–1984), Turkish writer
- Sk. Tahsin Ali, Bangladeshi judge

== Surname ==
=== Tahseen ===
- Dumooa Tahseen (born 1991), Iraqi singer
- Qudsia Tahseen (born 1964), Indian Professor of Zoology
- Shahyan Tahseen, also transliterated as Şehyan Tehsîn, (born 1988), Kurdish anchor, television presenter and reporter
- Zaid Tahseen (born 2001), Iraqi footballer

=== Tahsin ===
- Hasan Tahsin, the code name of Osman Nevres (1888–1919), an Ottoman-born Turkish nationalist, patriot, journalist, republican from a Dönmeh background and a hero of the Turkish nation
- Hasan Tahsin Pasha (1845–1918), a senior Ottoman military officer, who served in Yemen and in the First Balkan War
- Hasan Tahsin (poet) (1800/1801–1861), also known as Kör Tahsin ("Blind Tahsin"), Turkish Cypriot divan poet and Islamic jurist
- Soeraedi Tahsin (died 2003), also known as Eddie Soeraedi, Indonesian journalist and diplomat

== Others ==
- Abu Tahsin al-Salhi (1953–2017), Iraqi veteran sniper

== See also ==
- Tahsini
