= Occupation of Lebanon =

Occupation of Lebanon may refer to:

- Israeli occupation of Southern Lebanon (1982–2000)
- Syrian occupation of Lebanon (1976–2005)
