= Cedar Revolution =

2005 anti-Syrian protest movement in Lebanon

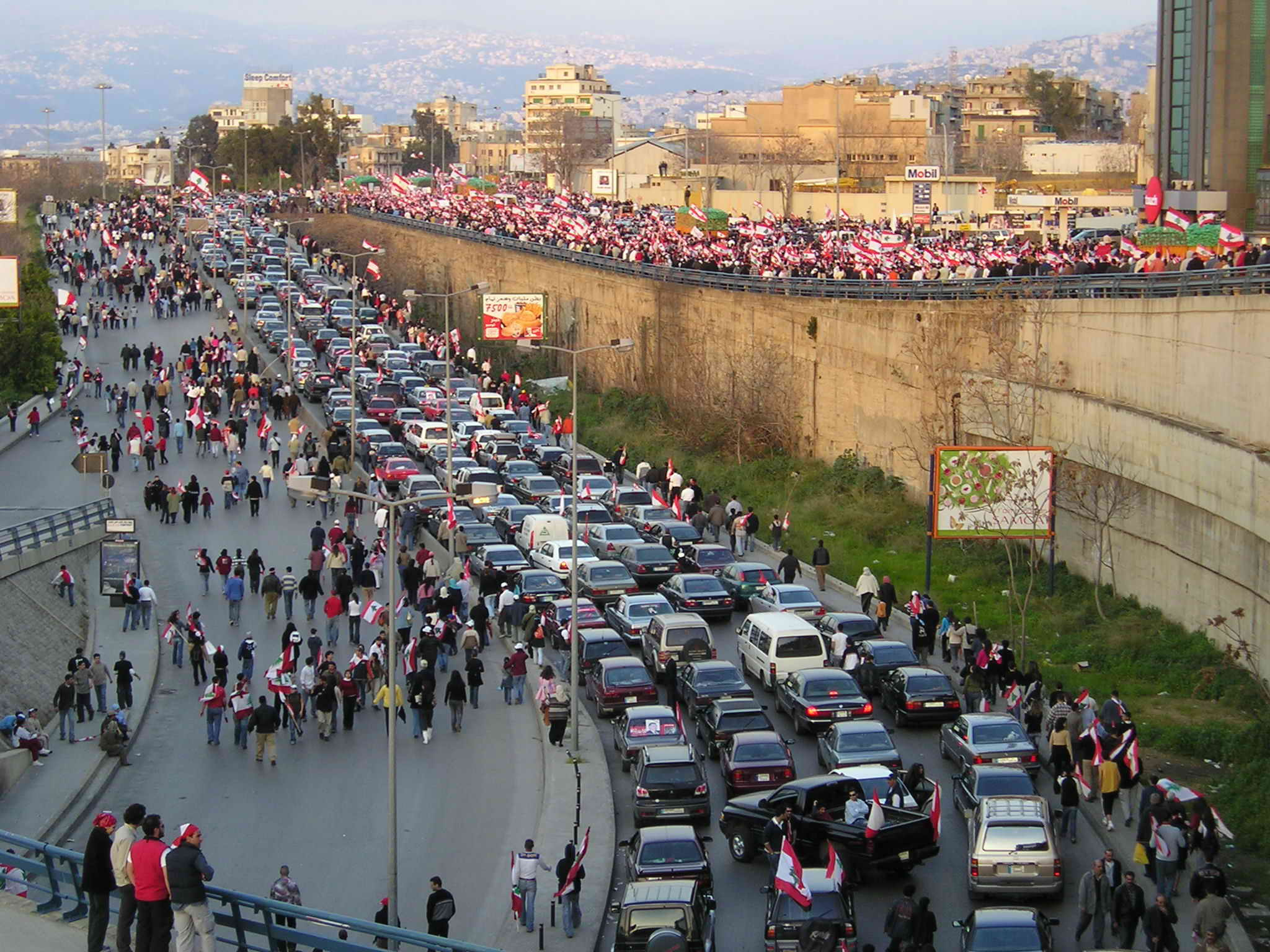
- Cedar Revolution demonstrations in Lebanon triggered by the assassination of the former Lebanese Prime Minister Rafic Hariri.
- Date: 14 February – 27 April 2005
- Location: Lebanon (especially in the capital Beirut)
- Caused by: The assassination of the former Lebanese Prime Minister Rafic Hariri
- Goals: Withdrawal of Syrian troops from Lebanon; Ousting Karami's pro-Syrian government; Firing the six Lebanese commanders of the nation's main security services along with the State Prosecutor; Executing the complete withdrawal of the Syrian troops and their security services from Lebanon; Bringing Rafic Hariri’s assassin to justice; Running free and democratic parliament elections in spring 2005 free from Syrian interference; Return of Amine Gemayel to power; Improving Lebanon's ties with the Western world
- Result: Victory of the anti-Syrian coalition

Parties
Before March 14: (Lebanon) Anti-Syrian protesters and groups After March 14: March 14 Alliance; Kataeb Party; Lebanese Forces; Future Movement; Progressive Socialist Party; National Liberal Party; Democratic Left Movement; National Bloc; Independence Movement; Free Patriotic Movement	(Ba'athist Syria) Syrian Arab Armed Forces (Lebanon) Lebanese Government Before March 8: Pro-Syrian protesters and groups After March 8: March 8 Alliance; Hezbollah; SSNP-L; Amal Movement; Marada Movement; Lebanese Ba'ath Party (pro-Syrian faction); Dignity Movement

Lead figures
Amine Gemayel; Pierre Gemayel; Samy Gemayel; Nadim Gemayel; Samir Geagea; Sethrida Geagea; Saad Hariri; Fouad Siniora; Walid Jumblatt; Camille Chamoun; Samir Kassir; Ziad Majed; Gebran Tueni Michel Aoun	Bashar al-Assad; Muhammad Naji al-Otari; Hasan Turkmani; Ali Habib Mahmud; Émile Lahoud; Omar Karami (Hezbollah) Hassan Nasrallah (Hezbollah) Mohammad Raad; Gebran Araiji; Assaad Hardan; Nabih Berri; Sleiman Frangieh; Assem Qanso

Number
Around 1 million protesters	
- Popular mottos of the movement were Hurriyye, Siyede, Istiqlel (Freedom, Sovereignty, Independence), and Haqiqa, Hurriyye, Wehde wataniyye (Truth, Freedom, National unity)

The Cedar Revolution (Arabic: ثورة الأرز, romanized: thawrat al-arz), known in Lebanon as the Independence intifada (انتفاضة الاستقلال, intifadat al-istiqlal), was a chain of demonstrations in Lebanon (especially in the capital Beirut) triggered by the assassination of former Lebanese Prime Minister Rafic Hariri. The popular movement was remarkable for its avoidance of violence, peaceful approach, and its total reliance on methods of civil resistance.

The primary goals of the activists were the withdrawal of the Syrian troops which had occupied Lebanon since 1976, the replacement of a government heavily influenced by Syrian interests by more independent leadership, the establishment of an international commission to investigate the assassination of Prime Minister Hariri, the resignation of security officials to ensure the success of the plan, and the organization of free parliamentary elections. More generally, the demonstrators demanded the end of the Syrian influence in Lebanese politics.

At the start of the demonstrations, Syria had a force of roughly 14,000 soldiers and intelligence agents in Lebanon. Following the demonstrations, the Syrian troops completely withdrew from Lebanon on 27 April 2005. With the resignation of the pro-Syrian Karami government on 19 April, the 2005 general election, and the establishment of the Special Tribunal for Lebanon, the main goals of the revolution were achieved.

The opposition used the white-and-red scarf and the blue ribbon as its symbols. The most popular motto of the movement was Hurriyyeh, Siyedeh, Istiqlel (Freedom, Sovereignty, Independence).

== Goals ==
The main goal of the Cedar Revolution was the ending of the Syrian military occupation of Lebanon, which had lasted about 30 years (since 1976). In addition, many Lebanese called for the return of former president Michel Aoun, in exile since 1991, and the release of the imprisoned Lebanese Forces leader Samir Geagea.

Additional goals of the revolution are:

- Ousting Karami's Pro-Syrian government
- Firing the six Lebanese commanders of the nation's main security services, along with the State Prosecutor
- Unmasking the killers of former prime minister Rafic Hariri
- Running free and democratic parliament elections in spring 2005 free from Syrian interference

== Origins of the name ==
The name "Cedar Revolution" is a term that was coined by the U.S. Under Secretary of State for Global Affairs Paula J. Dobriansky in a news conference, and used to draw a comparison with the Rose Revolution of Georgia, the Orange Revolution of Ukraine, and the Purple Revolution of Iraq. Other names include the Cedar Spring (Arabic: ربيع الأرز – Rabi' el Arz), referring to the season when protests first broke out, and also as an allusion to famous freedom and independence movements such as the Prague Spring and Damascus Spring. The names used by the local media, like the LBC and Future TV, to describe this event include Lebanon Independence (Istiqlal Lubnan), Lebanon Spring (Rabi' Lubnan), or Independence 05. It was also known as Independence Uprising (Arabic: انتفاضة الاستقلال, romanized: intifāḍat al-istiqlāl).

The word Cedar refers to a national emblem, the Cedar of Lebanon, a tree featured on the flag of Lebanon.

== Groups involved in the revolution ==
=== Civilian groups and organizations ===
- Qornet Shehwan Gathering (Liqa' Qornet Shehwan): Gathering of Christian Lebanese politicians ranging from center left to center right.
- Democratic Forum (Al Minbar Al Dimokrati): Multi-confessional gathering of Lebanese politicians from different political parties with leftist tendencies, led by Habib Sadek
- Citizens for a Free Lebanon: A Non-governmental organization
- The Center for Democracy in Lebanon: A non-governmental grass-root movement
- The Global Organization of Democratic Believers: An all volunteer group of various religious backgrounds

=== Main political parties involved in the revolution ===
In Alphabetical Order:

- Democratic Renewal Movement (Harakat Al-Tajadod Al-Dimokrati) Multi-confessional Movement Leader: Nassib Lahoud, former MP and presidential hopeful.
- Democratic Left (Al Yassar Al Dimokrati) Multi-Confessional Movement Leader: Elias Atallah, former MP and former member of the communist party
- Free Patriotic Movement (At Tayyar Al-Watani Al-Horr) Movement Leader: Michel Aoun, MP. Also presides the "Change and Reform" coalition. He was one of the first to demand the Syrian withdrawal. The movement left the 14 March coalition before the 2005 elections after General Aoun came back from his Paris exile.
- Syrian Traces Leader: unknown
- Future Movement (Tayyar Al Mustaqbal) Muslim Sunni Movement Leader: Saad Hariri, MP and son of Rafiq Hariri
- Lebanese Forces (Al Quwwat al Lubnaniyya) Christian Party Leader: Samir Geagea, jailed 11 years by the Syrians
- Lebanese Liberation Movement Leader: unknown
- Lebanese National Bloc (Hizb Al Kitla Al Wataniya) Christian Party Leader: Carlos Eddé nephew of former leader Raymond Eddé. The Lebanese National Bloc left the 14 March Coalition in June 2009 after the parliamentary election
- National Liberal Party (Hizb Al-Wataniyin Al-Ahrar) Christian Party Leader: Dory Chamoun, son of former president Camille Chamoun
- Phalangist Party (Al-Kataeb Al-Loubnaniya) Christian Party Leader: Amin Gemayel, former president of Republic.
- Progressive Socialist Party (Hizb al-Taqadummi al-Ishtiraki) Druze Party Leader: Walid Jumblat, a sectarian leader was the first ally with Al-Asad, MP and son of former leader Kamal Jumblat; The PSP left the 14 March Coalition in August 2009
- Armenian Democratic Liberal Party (Hizb al-Ramgavar) MP Jean Ogassapian.
- Social Democrat Hunchakian Party (Hizb al-Henchag) MP Sebouh Kalpakian.

== Background ==
=== 2001 Lebanon Protest ===
An Anti-Syrian occupation demonstration took place in Lebanon on 7 August 2001, which turned violent when the joint Lebanese-Syrian security System tried to repress the revolt, and resulted in the arrest of hundreds without legal justification, during the tenure of the pro-Syrian president Emile Lahoud. On that day, the security forces attacked hundreds of young activists, mainly from the Christian parties, including the Free Patriotic Movement, the Lebanese Forces, the National Liberal Party and other non-partisan neutral activists in front of the Justice Palace in Beirut and engaged in a campaign of beatings and arrests that was characterized by extreme ferocity.

=== Assassination of Rafic Hariri ===
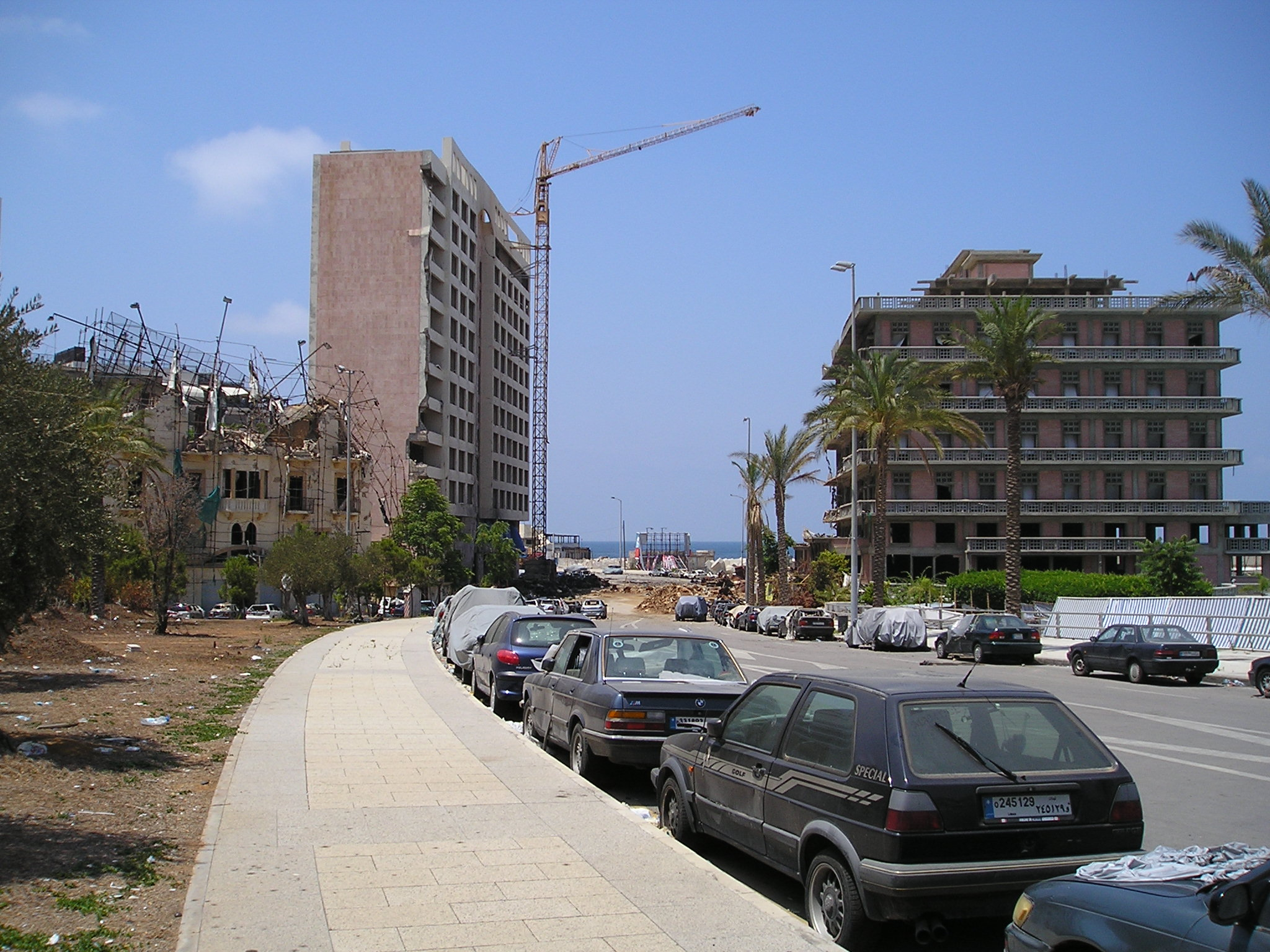
Rue Minet al Hosn where Rafic Hariri was assassinated on 14 February 2005.

On 14 February 2005, the former Lebanese Prime Minister Rafic Hariri was assassinated in a truck bomb attack, which killed 21 and wounded nearly 100. Former Minister of Economy and Trade Bassel Fleihan later died as well from injuries sustained in the blast. This attack sparked huge demonstrations that seemed to unite large numbers of citizens from the usually fractured and sectarian Lebanese population. It was the second such incident in four months: former minister and MP Marwan Hamadeh had survived a car bomb attack on 1 October 2004.

Within hours of the assassination, Lebanese prosecutors issued warrants for the arrest of six Australian nationals who flew out of Beirut to Sydney, Australia three hours after the explosion claiming that seats occupied by the men had tested positive for traces of explosives, and that they were traveling without luggage. The Australian Federal Police interviewed ten individuals in Sydney upon the arrival of the flight, and found the men they questioned did have luggage. Although Sydney airport security sniffer dogs trained to find explosives did react to aircraft seats occupied by the men, test swabs taken from three of the men by the Australian Federal Police tested negative for explosives. Within 48 hours, the Australian Federal Police absolved the six of any involvement in the assassination, giving little credibility to claims of the Lebanese officials.

Despite the lack, to date, of any actual substantial evidence implicating any party or individual, the Syrian government has borne the brunt of Lebanese and international outrage at the murder, because of its extensive military and intelligence influence in Lebanon, as well as the public rift between Hariri and Damascus just before his last resignation on 20 October 2004. The day after Hariri's resignation, pro-Syrian former prime minister Omar Karami was appointed prime minister.

Lebanese Druze leader Walid Jumblatt, a recent adherent to the anti-Syrian opposition, emboldened by popular anger and civic action, alleged in the wake of the assassination that in August 2004 Syrian President Bashar al-Assad threatened Hariri, saying "[President of Lebanon] Lahoud is me. ... If you and Chirac want me out of Lebanon, I will break Lebanon." He was quoted as saying "When I heard him telling us those words, I knew that it was his condemnation of death." The United States, the EU and the UN have stopped short of any accusations, choosing instead to demand a Syrian pullout from Lebanon and an open and international investigation of the assassination. Jumblatt's comments are not without controversy; the BBC describes him as "being seen by many as the country's political weathervane" – consistently changing allegiances to emerge on the winning side of the issues de jour through the turmoil of the 1975–90 civil war and its troubled aftermath. He was a supporter of Syria after the war but switched sides after the death of former Syrian president Hafez al-Assad in 2000. His account is quoted, but not confirmed, in the UN's FitzGerald Report. The report stops short of directly accusing Damascus or any other party, saying that only a further thorough international inquest can identify the culprit. The Lebanese government has agreed to this inquiry, though calling for the full participation, not supremacy, of its own agencies and the respect of Lebanese sovereignty. (See international reaction below.)

On 21 February 2005, tens of thousands of Lebanese protesters held a rally at the site of the assassination calling for an end of Syrian occupation and blaming Syria and the pro-Syrian president Émile Lahoud for the murder. In the subsequent weeks, nearly every Monday, a demonstration was held at Beirut's Martyrs Square (also referred to by protesters as "Liberty Square"), in addition to the constant daily gathering of Lebanese there.

Similar demonstrations by Lebanese immigrants were also taken place in several cities across the world, including Sydney – Australia (where over 10,000 people demonstrated in the city), San Francisco, Paris, Düsseldorf, Montreal, and London.

== Government resignation ==
Daily protests against the Syrian occupation attracted 25,000 people. While in the 1990s most anti-Syrian demonstrations were predominantly Christian and were put down by force, the new demonstrations were distinctly non-sectarian and the government did not respond with force or intimidation.

On 28 February, the government of pro-Syrian prime minister Omar Karami resigned, calling for a new election to take place. Karami said in his announcement: "I am keen the government will not be a hurdle in front of those who want the good for this country". The tens of thousands gathered at Beirut's Martyrs' Square cheered the announcement, then chanted "Karami has fallen, your turn will come, Lahoud, and yours, Bashar".

Opposition MPs were not satisfied with only Karami's resignation, and kept pressing for full Syrian withdrawal. Former minister and MP Marwan Hamadeh, who survived a similar car bomb attack on 1 October 2004, said "I accuse this government of incitement, negligence and shortcomings at the least, and of covering up its planning at the most... if not executing".

On 23 March, Michel Abu Arraj, the Lebanese magistrate responsible for the internal Lebanese investigation of the assassination asked to be excused, citing a heavy court schedule. The Judicial Council of Lebanon was expected to rule on his request the next day. His resignation and the consequent need to replace him raised the possibility of a delay in the investigation.

== International reaction ==
Hariri's murder triggered increased international pressure on Syria. In a joint statement, U.S. President George W. Bush and French president Jacques Chirac condemned the killing and called for full implementation of UN Security Council Resolution 1559, which requires the withdrawal of Syrian troops from Lebanon and the disarming of Hezbollah thriving in Southern Lebanon.

At one point there seemed to be confusion about the extent to which Syria was willing to withdraw from Lebanon. Arab League head Amr Moussa declared that Syrian president Assad promised him a phased withdrawal over a two-year period, but the Syrian Information Minister Mahdi Dakhlallah said that Moussa had misunderstood the Syrian leader. Dakhlallah said that Syria will merely move its troops to eastern Lebanon. Since then, Syria has declared that Resolution 1559 will be fully complied with, and in a matter of months rather than years.

On 15 March, upon hearing purportedly leaked information that the United Nations' special investigation may have found that the Lebanese authorities covered up evidence of the murder, columnist Robert Fisk alleges that Hariri's two sons fled Lebanon, reportedly after being warned that they too were in danger of assassination.

UN Secretary-General Kofi Annan, in response to a request by the Security Council, sent a team of Irish, Egyptian and Moroccan specialists, led by Ireland's deputy police commissioner, Peter FitzGerald, to investigate the assassination. Even before the FitzGerald Report was published, Annan has said a further, more comprehensive investigation may be necessary. FitzGerald thanked the Lebanese government for its cooperation before departing. The report cites the Syrian presence in Lebanon as a factor contributing to the instability and polarization that preceded the assassination. The report also criticizes the Lebanese government and intelligence agencies for the handling of their own investigation into the affair, calling it flawed and inconclusive. The Lebanese government in turn has described the report as "alien to reality" and criticized the UN team for not seeking broader government participation in the investigation. The government has agreed to a further, more comprehensive international inquiry, but insisted that any future inquiry would have to work with the government. At a press conference on 25 March, then Lebanese Foreign Minister Mahmoud Hammoud said the inquiry would be expected to work within an established framework "in co-operation with the state".

== Syrian reaction ==
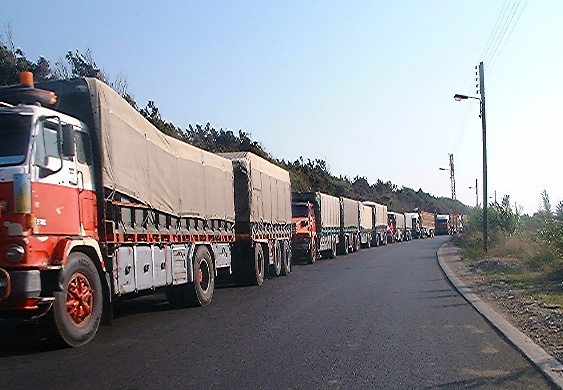
Trucks waiting in line after Syria closed its northern border with Lebanon following its withdrawal

On 2 March 2005, Syrian leader Bashar al-Assad announced that his troops would leave Lebanon completely "in the next few months". Responding to the announcement, opposition leader Walid Jumblatt said that he wanted to hear more specifics from Damascus about any withdrawal: "It's a nice gesture but 'next few months' is quite vague – we need a clear-cut timetable".

On 3 March, Germany and Russia joined those calling for Syria to comply with Resolution 1559. German Chancellor Gerhard Schröder said: "Lebanon should be given an opportunity for sovereignty and development and this can only be achieved by complying with Security Council resolutions that stipulate immediate Syrian withdrawal from Lebanon."

The Russian foreign minister, Sergei Lavrov, stated that "Syria should withdraw from Lebanon, but we all have to make sure that this withdrawal does not violate the very fragile balance which we still have in Lebanon, which is a very difficult country ethnically."

On 5 March, Syrian leader Assad declared in a televised speech that Syria would withdraw its forces to the Bekaa Valley in eastern Lebanon, and then to the border between Syria and Lebanon. He did not provide a timetable for a complete withdrawal of Syrian troops from Lebanon.

On the weekend of 9 and 10 April, on the anniversary of the ignition of the Lebanese Civil war, the last remaining Syrian troops left Lebanon, ending their 30-year presence.

== Response from the Arab world ==
Several Arab states also joined in with the withdrawal demands. As Assad arrived in Saudi Arabia for emergency consultation with then Crown Prince Abdullah bin Abdelaziz, Assad was told in no uncertain terms that Syria must comply with UN Security Council demands immediately. It was reported by the opposition Lebanese newspaper The Daily Star that Assad offered to remove most of the 15,000 troops Syria has stationed in Lebanon during the talks, but insisted on leaving a force of 3,000 in the country. This has not been independently corroborated.

The annual Arab summit, which took place on 23 March in Algeria, did not ask Syria to withdraw, which would have given the pullback an Arab endorsement as envisaged in the 1989 Taif Agreement rather than making it dependent on Resolution 1559. Algerian foreign minister Abdel-Aziz Belkhadem discussed the consensus ahead of the summit, stating that "we all agreed to demand the implementation of the Taif Accord with respect to international legitimacy". Controversially, the crisis in Lebanon was not included on the agenda for the summit, which almost half of the Arab leaders did not attend.

== Pro-Syrian demonstration ==
CNN noted some news agencies estimated the crowd at 200,000, the Associated Press news agency estimated that there were more than 500,000 pro-Syrian protesters, while The New York Times and Los Angeles Times simply estimated "hundreds of thousands". The predominantly Shi'ite protesters held pictures of Syrian President Bashar al-Assad and placards reading, in English, "No for the American Intervention". Some media sources noted that it was likely that many of Lebanon's approximately 500,000 Syrian guest workers participated in the rally.

Ten days after his resignation, Omar Karami was reappointed prime minister and called on the opposition to participate in government until the elections slated for April 2005.

On 13 March, tens of thousands protested in the southern city of Nabatiyé in support of Syria and opposition to UNSCR 1559, according to reports. The Tripoli protests were canceled.

== Resurgent counter-demonstrations ==
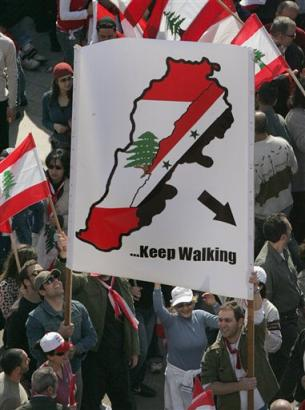
Anti-Syrian demonstration

On 14 March, the one-month memorial of the assassination of former prime minister Rafic Hariri, hundreds of thousands of Lebanese rallied in central Beirut on Monday chanting "Freedom, Sovereignty, Independence" and carrying a huge Lebanese flag. More than a million Lebanese flocked from throughout the country, many unable to even enter the city due to heavy traffic. The demonstration was called by the different factions of the anti-Syrian opposition (including the Hariri family and other groupings) and was trumpeted by the different private media, namely Future TV, a private enterprise part of the media empire controlled by Hariri's family and the Lebanese Broadcasting Corporation LBCI, generally aligned with the Lebanese Forces, the right-wing Christian party.

The demonstration occurred in Martyrs' Square, the site of Hariri's grave and a center of the newly reconstructed city rebuilt in large part through Hariri's efforts. During the Lebanese civil war, factional infighting between the groups united in Martyrs' Square had turned the area into an impassable moonscape.

The Lebanese protesters demanded an international inquiry into Hariri's murder, the firing of Syrian-backed security chiefs in the Lebanese government, and a total Syrian pullout from Lebanon.

== Violent repercussions ==
=== Bombings and assassinations ===
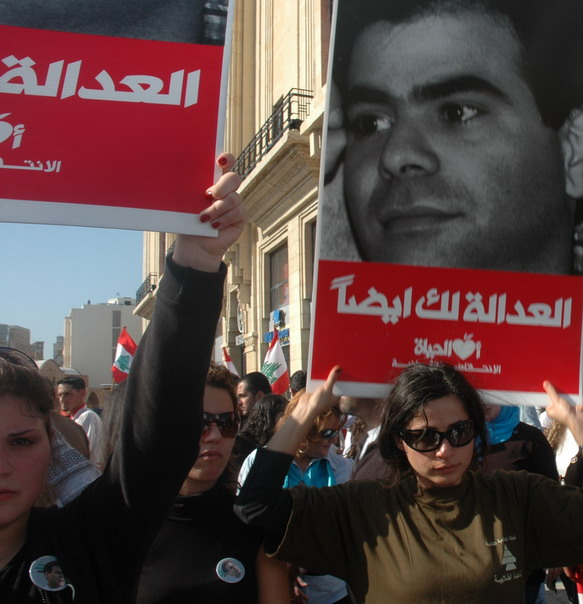
Protesters holding posters of assassinated minister Pierre Gemayel

Beginning in March 2005 and continuing throughout the year, a series of bombings and assassinations rocked Lebanon. Several political and intellectual figures vocally critical of Syrian interference in Lebanese politics, including Samir Kassir, George Hawi, and Gebran Tueni were killed. In addition, Christian areas were targeted by bombs. These bombings remain unsolved.

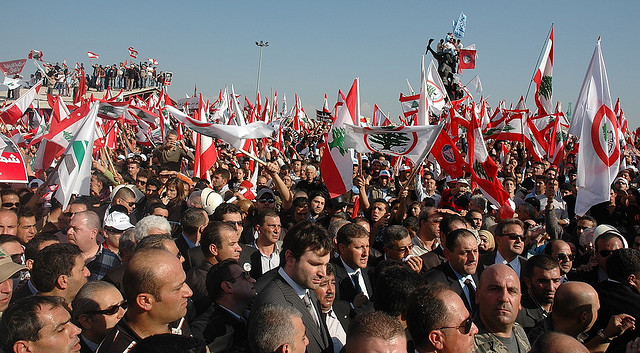
Protesters at Pierre Gemayel's funeral.

The attacks did not end in 2005. The next year, gunmen killed MP Pierre Amine Gemayel, and in 2007, Walid Eido was killed by a car bomb in Beirut. Most recently, politician Antoine Ghanem was assassinated when a car bomb exploded, killing him on 19 September 2007. He is the 6th independentist minister assassinated since Hariri's death.

According to sources, the bombing and assassination were in later years linked to Hezbollah's assassinatin squad - Unit 121. Following the international investigation of Rafic Hariri's assassination, Unit 121 activity came up, as well as names of main figures in it, such as: Salim Ayyash, Mustafa Badreddine, Hassan Habib Merhi, Hussein Hassan Oneissi.

== Withdrawal of Syrian troops ==
On 26 April 2005, international news agencies and the UN reported the last Syrian troops and intelligence agents had crossed the border in withdrawal from Lebanon. The Syrian government officially notified the United Nations that it had withdrawn its troops in line with UN Security Council Resolution 1559, adopted in September 2004. In a letter to the UN, Syrian foreign minister Farouq al-Shara said his country "would like to officially inform you that the Syrian Arab forces stationed in Lebanon, at the request of Lebanon and under an Arab mandate, have fully withdrawn all their military, security apparatus and assets." On 27 April 2005, the Lebanese People celebrated for the first time their first day free from Syrian omnipresence. Also on 27 April 2005, The Washington Post reported that "Syria has not withdrawn a significant part of its intelligence presence in Lebanon, undermining its claim yesterday to have ended its 29-year intervention in its western neighbor, U.S., European and U.N. officials said." This claim was reiterated by US Secretary of State, Condoleezza Rice on 25 May.

== Wave of democracy ==
Both participants and observers of the Cedar Revolution demonstrations have asked if the movement was influenced by recent local and regional events supporting democracy. Lebanese Druze leader Walid Jumblatt remarked to a reporter of The Washington Post, "It's strange for me to say it, but this process of change has started because of the American invasion of Iraq. I was cynical about Iraq. But when I saw the Iraqi people voting three weeks ago, 8 million of them, it was the start of a new Arab world".

Other views maintain that Lebanese anger against perceived Syrian hegemony had been simmering for decades, and the assassination of a popular leader was the spark that gave birth to the movement, independently of foreign and regional developments. Lebanese opposition leader and newspaper columnist Samir Kassir, for example, wrote that "democracy is spreading in the region not because of George Bush but despite him." He gave far more credit to the Palestinian uprising as an inspiration to Lebanese activists.

Others caution that very little has actually changed, apart from the mainly "cosmetic" disappearance of Syrian Soldiers from their presence on the outskirts of Lebanese cities, and that Syrian control of Lebanese foreign affairs and trade may yet endure. Some critics argue that the rush to celebrate a supposed 'Revolution' was far too premature.

When Omar Karami failed to form a government, he resigned for good on 13 April 2005, and elections were called for the period of 29 May through 19 June 2005. Saad Hariri formed an anti-Syrian bloc that, ultimately, won 72 of the 128 available seats in the unicameral National Assembly.

== Anniversaries ==
=== Second Anniversary ===
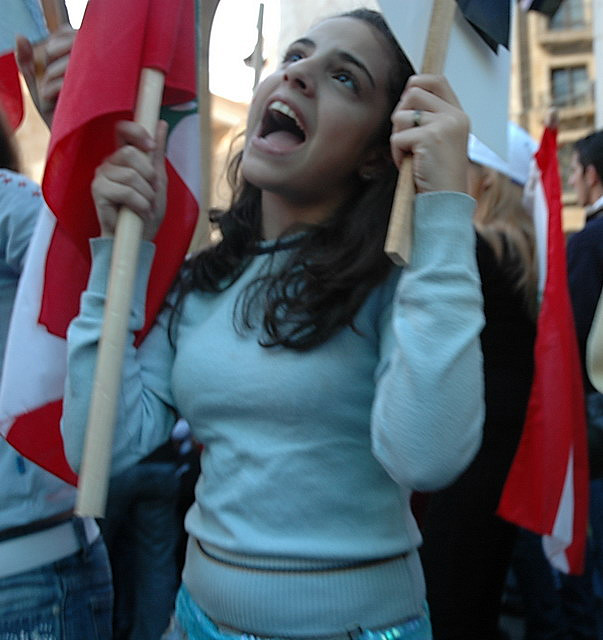
A protester in Martyr's Square, 2006

On 14 February 2007, tens of thousands of Lebanese gathered peacefully in Martyr's Square to commemorate the second anniversary of former prime minister Rafic Hariri's assassination. The large number proved that the Cedar Revolution was still going on, especially when the crowds turned the commemoration into a defiant opportunity to blame Syria and Hezbollah for Lebanon's political woes. The demonstrators fell silent at exactly 12:55 pm, the time of the explosion that killed Hariri on 14 February 2005. Only the muezzin making the Islamic call to prayer and the solemn tolling of church bells could be heard.

The Bikfaya bombings had taken place the day before, killing three people. Fatah al-Islam was blamed.

=== Third Anniversary ===
On 14 February, exactly three years from the day Premier Hariri was assassinated on the Beirut seafront, throngs of protesters rallied in Martyr's Square to commemorate the occasion. The crowd came from all over Lebanon. Hundreds of thousands of protesters filled the square and its immediate surrounding. In the mountainous areas, the weather conditions prevented several processions from reaching Beirut. Also, processions closed all roads east, north & south Beirut leading to Martyr's Square. Hundreds of boats embarked on a ride from the Jounieh port in the coast of Mount Lebanon to the Beirut Marina defying the winter waves. The rally was reaching its end while thousands of vehicles carrying protesters were still trapped in traffic in the Eastern Suburbs of Beirut. The crowds stood for more than 5 hours under the pouring rain. The protesters transformed this event into an occasion to blame Syria and renew their oath to remain united and defiant for Lebanon's sake. At the exact time the explosion occurred 3 years ago at 12:55, the crowds fell silent as the Islamic Adhan sounded through the mosques' muezzin along with the tolling of church bells symbolizing the Muslim-Christian unity. The leaders of the Anti-Syrian coalition gave fiery speeches blaming Syria & Iran for Lebanon's woes. Saad Hariri, the coalition's most popular leader, was the last to take the stand as supporting cheers blared from the crowds. In the end and after the crowds have stood for four consecutive hours under the pouring rain, the rally was concluded and the area was evacuated.

=== Fourth Anniversary ===
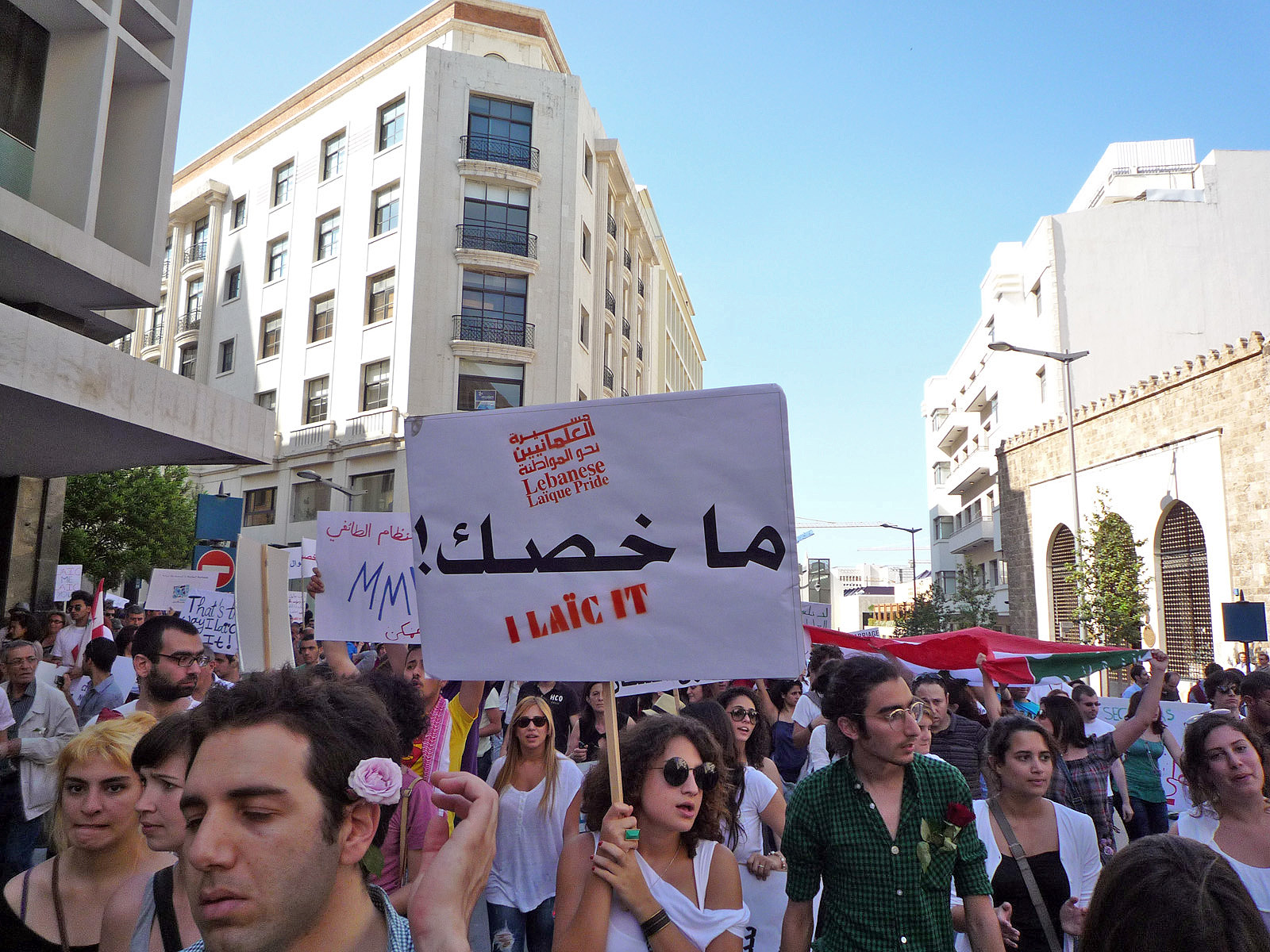
A side of the mass memorial rally in 2009

14 February 2009 marked the fourth anniversary of Prime Minister Rafic Hariri's assassination. Estimated to be more than 1 million supporters, pro-government and pro-Hariri citizens of different sects and factions gathered together in Beirut for the occasion. At 12:55 pm, the crowd went silent to mark the exact moment of the explosion that killed Hariri.

During the rally, speeches were given to entice the citizens to take place in the June 2009 parliamentary elections, in which the anti-Syrian coalition and the pro-Syrian coalition competed for the majority of seats.

=== Fifth Anniversary ===
The fifth anniversary of Hariri's assassination took place on 14 February 2010, as thousands of people crowded Beirut's Martyr's Square, as they do every year to honor the assassinated Proime Minister Rafic Hariri.

=== Sixth Anniversary ===
The sixth anniversary of Hariri's assassination, on 14 February 2011 was met with renewed enthusiasm by supporters of the March 14 coalition. This was especially fueled by the protester's anger over the resignation of all ten ministers aligned with the opposing March 8 coalition due to then-prime minister Saad Hariri, Rafic Hariri's son, refusal of Hezbollah's demand he reject the Special Tribunal for Lebanon. A rally was also organized to call for Hezbollah's disarmament on the day of March 13 in Beirut's Martyrs' Square. No significant disruptions took place, but it was reported by several TV stations that some protesters had their signs demanding Hezbollah's disarmament confiscated. Reuters approximated that tens of thousands of supporters of Saad Hariri and his allies rallied against Hezbollah's weapons.

== See also ==
- List of extrajudicial killings and political violence in Lebanon
- Syrian occupation of Lebanon
- List of attacks in Lebanon
- 2007 Lebanon conflict
- Colour revolutions – as a series of related movements
- 2021 Lebanese protests
