= Syria Accountability Act =

2003 bill passed by the U.S. Congress

- Long title: Syria Accountability and Lebanese Sovereignty Restoration Act
- Acronyms (colloquial): SALSRA
- Enacted by: the 108th United States Congress

Legislative history
- Introduced in the House by Eliot Engel (D–NY) on April 12, 2003; Signed into law by President George W. Bush on December 12, 2003

The Syria Accountability and Lebanese Sovereignty Restoration Act (SALSRA,Pub. L. 108–175 (text) (PDF)) is a bill of the United States Congress passed into law on December 12, 2003.

The bill's stated purpose is to end what the United States sees as Syrian support for terrorism, to end Syria's presence in Lebanon, which has been in effect since the end of the Lebanese Civil War in 1990, to stop Syria's alleged development of WMDs, to cease Syria's illegal importation of Iraqi oil and to end illegal shipments of military items to anti-US forces in Iraq.

The bill was sponsored by Representative Eliot L. Engel (D) from New York and was introduced April 12, 2003. The Lebanese opposition figure Michel Aoun played a prominent role in passing the law and provided testimony to Congress.

== 2013 Ghouta chemical attack ==
In response to the use of chemical weapons against civilians during the 2013 Ghouta chemical attack, president Barack Obama asked Congress to authorize the use of military force against Syria. An early draft of that authorization cites the Syria Accountability Act, saying:

Whereas in the Syria Accountability and Lebanese Sovereignty Restoration Act of 2003, Congress found that Syria’s acquisition of weapons of mass destruction threatens the security of the Middle East and the national security interests of the United States.

== See also ==
- Sanctions against Syria
- Pax Syriana
