= United Nations Security Council Resolution 1559 =

UN Security Council Resolution 1559
- Lebanon
- Date: 2 September 2004
- Meeting no.: 5,028
- Code: S/RES/1559 (Document)
- Subject: The situation in the Middle East
- Voting summary: 9 voted for; None voted against; 6 abstained
- Result: Adopted

Security Council composition
- Permanent members: China; France; Russia; United Kingdom; United States
- Non-permanent members: Algeria; Angola; Benin; Brazil; Chile; Germany; Pakistan; Philippines; Romania; Spain

United Nations Security Council resolution 1559, adopted on 2 September 2004, after recalling resolutions 425 (1978), 426 (1978), 520 (1982) and 1553 (2004) on the situation in Lebanon, the Council supported free and fair presidential elections in Lebanon, urging the Lebanese government to establish control over its territory, disarm militias like Hezbollah, and facilitate the withdrawal of any remaining foreign forces from the country.

Nine countries voted in favor: Angola, Benin, Chile, France, Germany, Romania, Spain, the United Kingdom, and the United States. Six countries abstained: Algeria, Brazil, China, Pakistan, the Philippines and Russia.

The resolution was sponsored by France and the United States. The cooperation between these two nations on an issue concerning the Middle East was seen as a significant improvement in their relationship, compared to their earlier bitter disagreement over the 2003 invasion of Iraq. Because Lebanon was governed by France as a League of Nations mandate 1919–1943, France has long taken a special interest in Lebanon.

== Contents of resolution ==
It called on Lebanon to establish its sovereignty over all of its territory and called on Syria as a foreign force to withdraw from Lebanon and to cease intervening in the internal politics of Lebanon. The resolution also called on all Lebanese and foreign forces on Lebanese soil to disband and declared support for a "free and fair electoral process".

== Aftermath ==
The resolution was coauthored by France and the United States. Echoing the Taif Agreement, the resolution "calls upon all remaining foreign forces to withdraw from Lebanon" and "for the disbanding and disarmament of all Lebanese and non-Lebanese militias." Lebanon has requested that Israel withdraw from the disputed Shebaa Farms and the hills of Kfar-Shouba and return the Lebanese detainees in Israel as a condition for fully implementing Resolution 1559 which includes disbanding of the military wing of Hezbollah. Critics of the resolution argue however that an attempt from the weak and politically divided Lebanese army to disarm Hezbollah would be very difficult and could restart the Lebanese civil war. Syria was also in violation of the resolution until recently because of their military presence in Lebanon.

On 7 October 2004, the UN Secretary General Kofi Annan reported to the Security Council regarding the lack of compliance with Resolution 1559. Mr. Annan concluded his report by saying: "It is time, 14 years after the end of hostilities and four years after the Israeli withdrawal from Lebanon, for all parties concerned to set aside the remaining vestiges of the past. The withdrawal of foreign forces and the disbandment and disarmament of militias would, with finality, end that sad chapter of Lebanese history."

The 20 January 2005 UN Secretary-General's report on Lebanon stated that "The continually asserted position of the Government of Lebanon that the Blue Line is not valid in the Shab'a farms area is not compatible with Security Council resolutions. The Council has recognized the Blue Line as valid for purposes of confirming Israel’s withdrawal pursuant to resolution 425 (1978). The UN Security Council has repeatedly requested that all parties respect the Blue Line in its entirety."

On 28 January 2005, Resolution 1583 called upon the Government of Lebanon to fully extend and exercise its sole and effective authority throughout the south, including through the deployment of sufficient numbers of Lebanese armed and security forces, to ensure a calm environment throughout the area, including along the Blue Line, and to exert control over the use of force on its territory and from it.

Syria made few moves to comply with the resolution until the assassination of Rafik Hariri, the former Prime Minister of Lebanon, on 14 February 2005. International pressure to withdraw intensified and public perception in Lebanon turned strongly against Syria, evidenced by mass demonstrations that were labeled the Cedar Revolution. President Bashar al-Assad of Syria announced on 5 March 2005 that he planned to "bring his forces home." The withdrawal, which involved about 14,000 troops, took about seven weeks to complete.

On 26 April 2005, after 29 years of military action in Lebanon, the last Syrian troops left Lebanon. Syrian military and intelligence facilities, after the destruction of sensitive documents or the transportation of logistical material, were turned over to Lebanese counterparts. This action left the Lebanese government as the main violator of the resolution due to its refusal to dismantle the pro-Syrian Palestinian and Hezbollah militias.

On 27 December 2005, Katyusha rockets fired from Hezbollah territory smashed into houses in the Israeli city of Kiryat Shmona wounding three people. UN Secretary General Kofi Annan called on the Lebanese government "to extend its control over all its territory, to exert its monopoly on the use of force, and to put an end to all such attacks".

On 23 January 2006, the UN Security Council called on the Government of Lebanon to make more progress in controlling its territory and disbanding militias, while also calling on Syria to cooperate with those efforts. In a statement read out by its January President, Augustine Mahiga of Tanzania, the council also called on Syria to take measures to stop movements of arms and personnel into Lebanon.

== Lebanese response ==
The Lebanese government officially responded to the resolution on the Lebanese Armed Forces (LAF) website in as follows:

1. The only foreign forces existing in Lebanon are the Israeli forces which occupy the farms of Shebaa. Whereas the Syrian forces are friendly Arab forces which entered Lebanon according to the Lebanese government's demand and their existence is regulated by the convention of brotherhood and coordination and cooperation between Lebanon and Syria and a copy of this convention was submitted to the United States at that time. - And in this context the Syrian forces carried out five redeployment operations in the Lebanese regions according to the resolution of the mutual military committee of the two brother armies.
2. An immediate withdrawal of the Syrian Arab forces according to the security council's resolution number 1559 cannot be executed however the redeployment operations are carried out in cooperation between the two countries and specifically in the framework of the high military committee. The national resistance which is confronting the Israeli occupation is not a guerilla and it has no security role inside the country and its activities are restricted to facing the Israeli enemy. This resistance led to the withdrawal of the enemy from the bigger part of our occupied land and is still persistent to free the farms of Shebaa. Preserving this resistance constitutes a Lebanese strategic interest with the aim of relating the struggle with the enemy and regain all the Lebanese legitimate rights achieving and at the forefront the withdrawal of Israel from the farms of Shebaa and the return of the refugees to their land.
3. As for the Palestinian presence in the camps in all its known considerations is resultant from the practices of Israel which expulsed the Palestinians and the resort of a part of them to Lebanon, and most of them live in refugee camps fostered by the United Nations and the UNRWA organization. The Palestinians are claiming the right of return according to the international resolutions and especially the resolution number 194. In this framework the government preserved their particularities inside the camps which the army encircles and does not allow the traffic of arms outside of it and the army offered many martyrs and exerted great efforts to control the situation.
4. The Lebanese who are familiar with the ruthless ordeals that the country witnessed during a long period of time paid its price with a huge flood of blood and losses of properties, and knew the ways to escape from the absurd wars and the others' conflicts on their land, and realized the importance of the return of security and stability and prosperity to the country, are those who are fully aware of what serves their interests and guarantees and preserves the independence and sovereignty of their country away from the suspicious adventures which has proven their barrenness, and all the attempts in this field constitute the best evidence.

Hezbollah and the Loyalty to the Resistance bloc denounced a report on the resolution in 2010 as meddling in Lebanese affairs.

== Lebanese political debate ==
The question of compliance with Resolution 1559 is a prominent matter in Lebanese politics. Former PM Fouad Siniora stated in January 2006 that the Lebanese government considered the armament of Hezbollah to be a domestic affair which, in his opinion, should reassure Hezbollah that the government will protect its military wing.

Druze leader MP Walid Jumblatt has repeatedly insisted that he objects to the disarmament of Hezbollah, according to the international resolution, describing the party as a "resistance group" and not a militia. He engaged in an electoral alliance with Hezbollah during the 2005 parliamentary election, with one of the titles of the alliance being "The Protection of the Resistance," but is now calling on Hezbollah to be integrated into the Lebanese Army and hand in its weapons over to the government.

Siniora has more stated on 20 July 2006 that "the continued presence of Israeli occupation of Lebanese lands in the Shebaa Farms region is what contributes to the presence of Hezbollah weapons. The international community must help us in (getting) an Israeli withdrawal from Shebaa Farms so we can solve the problem of Hezbollah's arms."

Critics have said that the existence of Hezbollah, is a violation of UN security council resolution 1559, which was adopted in 2004 since it called for all militias in Lebanon, including Hezbollah to disband. Part of the mandate of UNIFIL which has operated in Lebanon since 1978 mission in Lebanon is to disarm Hezbollah.

== See also ==
- 2006 Lebanon war
- Blue Line
- History of Lebanon
- Lebanon–Syria relations
- List of United Nations Security Council Resolutions 1501 to 1600 (2003–2005)
- Pax Syriana
- United Nations Security Council Resolution 1701
- Homeland Shield plan
