= Tahsini =

Tahsini is a surname. Notable people with the surname include:

- Hasan Tahsini (1811–1881), Albanian alim, astronomer, mathematician, and philosopher
- Mehmet Tahsini (1864–?), Albanian politician, active in the Ottoman Empire and Albania

== See also ==
- Tahsin
