= Lebanese–Syrian Security Apparatus =

The Lebanese-Syrian Security Apparatus (or the Syrian Intelligence Apparatus in Lebanon, Arabic: النظام الأمني اللبناني السوري), was a network of intelligence officers and security leaders in Syria and Lebanon that is believed to have been the actual ruling power behind the Lebanese government during the Syrian occupation of Lebanon, which ended in 2005.

The apparatus exerted significant influence over Lebanese affairs, playing a crucial role in determining appointments to public positions. The Bekaa Valley town of Anjar, where the Syrian apparatus headquarters was located, became a center of power in Lebanon, with Syrian intelligence officials like General Ghazi Kan'an and General Rustum Ghazali having a significant say in cabinet appointments, while the Syrian president appointed and extended the terms of Lebanese presidents. The military and security forces in Lebanon were under the control of Syria's allies like Gen. Emile Lahoud (the army commander) and Gen. Jamil al-Sayyid (the deputy director of military intelligence).

The apparatus began to decline in the late 1990s as Lebanese political elites began to assert their independence from Syria. The apparatus was finally dismantled in 2005 following the Cedar Revolution, a popular uprising that forced Syria to withdraw its troops from Lebanon.

== History ==
This apparatus was established in the late 1970s when Syria intervened in Lebanon's civil war. It was composed of Syrian intelligence officers and Lebanese collaborators who were tasked with maintaining Syrian control over Lebanon.

== Additional resources ==
- MERIP: Syria and Lebanon: A Brotherhood Transformed

== See also ==
- Wissam al-Hassan
