= Al Jadeed =

Lebanese TV channel

- Al Jadeed logo
- Country: Lebanon
- Broadcast area: Lebanon; Worldwide (via Internet)
- Headquarters: Salim Salam, Beirut

Programming
- Language: Arabic
- Picture format: 1080p

Ownership
- Owner: Tahseen Khayat

History
- Launched: 1992; 34 years ago
- Former names: New TV

Links
- Website: www.aljadeed.tv

Al Jadeed (Arabic: الجديد, romanized: al-Jadīd, lit. 'the new', English: New TV) is an independent Lebanese TV station. Headquartered in Beirut, it was launched in 1992 and paused its broadcasts in 1997 due to Syrian intervention, before resuming broadcasting in 2001.

On 9 May 2005, Al Jadeed was also launched in America and the Pacific, reaching Arabic-speaking immigrants in the United States, Canada, South America and Australia. As of 2012, it has become available for viewers in South America through over-the-top technology on myTV.

In 2007, a copyright issue arose with the name "New TV" and the channel Arabized its name, to which it became Al Jadeed TV. The station is owned by Tahsin Khayat.

== History ==
=== From 1991 to 1996: New TV ===
Up to 1996, New TV was regularly in conflict with the ruling leaders. At the end of 1996, the Lebanese Ministry of Information decided to shut many TV stations, including New TV, the only secular broadcaster in Lebanese. Only five channels then got the right to broadcast, chosen according to match religious communities’ demands.

=== Since 2001: Al Jadeed TV ===
From 2000, New TV received a licence again and it became Al Jadeed TV in 2001.

== Attacks, threats and intimidation attempts against Al Jadeed TV ==
=== Broadcasting suspended in 2003 ===
In January 2003, Information Ministry Michel Samaha ordered to hold the broadcasting of Al Jadeed TV's programs. This decision involved the Bila Rakeeb weekly program that had been advertising on revelations about Saudi Arabia.

=== Chairman arrested in 2003 ===
On December 7, 2003, Tahseen Khayat, Al Jadeed TV's Chairman was arrested at home and held in custody for two days. The channel's offices and Tahseen Khayat's home were searched.

=== Threats against a female anchor in 2003 ===
In July 2003, Al Jadeed TV broadcast a new documentary involving the Lebanese General Jamil El Sayed in a corruption case with Syria. Most of the channel's managers were summoned to the Tribunal of Beirut. Among them was Dalia Ahmad, a famous anchor. As a non-Lebanese, her work permit was withdrawn and she was then told she could work for any other Lebanese TV station but not Al Jadeed. She finally resigned in December 2003. She then worked in the United States for Al Hurra and eventually came back to Al Jadeed TV after Jamil Al Sayed's arrest in October 2005. Independently from this case, she resigned again in 2018 and came back to the station in 2019.

=== El Suddik case in 2006 ===
In December 2006, three Al Jadeed reporters were arrested following their investigation into the former Prime Minister Rafic Hariri’s assassination and their lead on Muhammad Zuhair El Suddik, one of the false witnesses. They were jailed for 45 days and released after their report was broadcast.

=== Attack against the Chairman's house ===
In March 2010, a hundred members of the Druze community surrounded Tahseen Khayat's house and threatened to set fire to it. Although they did some damage to the house, they eventually withdrew after the Druze leader Walid Jumblat intervened.

=== Murder of an Al Jadeed cameraman ===
On April 9, 2012, an Al Jadeed crew went to northern Lebanon along the Syrian border. They were then fired at by the Syrian forces. Ali Shaaban was killed while Hussein Khreiss and Abed Khayat were seriously injured.

=== Assault against Al Jadeed headquarters in 2012 ===
In June 2012, masked men set fire to tires in front of Al Jadeed’s office’s main door after the channel had released an interview with Ahmed al-Assir, a Sunni Sheikh. Al Jadeed’s security team arrested one of the men.

=== Grenade attack against Al Jadeed headquarters in 2019 ===
In February 2019, the TV station was attacked with a hand grenade thrown out of a car. The suspects were affiliated with the Lebanese Progressive Socialist Party, to which the party’s leader Walid Jumblatt later allowed authorities to arrest them and had a dinner with the channel's owner Tahsin Khayyat.

== Legal: Prosecution by the Special Tribunal for Lebanon ==
In January 2014, the Special Tribunal for Lebanon (a UN mandated tribunal set to judge Rafic Hariri's murderers) issued an order in lieu of indictment against the journalist Karma Khayat and Al Jadeed TV for whom she was the information programs director at the time of the incriminated facts. The Lebanese journalist and the channel are accused of contempt charges and justice obstruction after they released compromising information regarding the witnesses’ protection system of the tribunal.

In August 2012, Al Jadeed TV had broadcast a 5 episodes documentary showing serious failures inside the tribunal related to the anonymity of the witnesses and their protection. Beside, the channel's teams had taken all the necessary measures to keep the interrogated persons anonymous (blurred faces, no name given).

A year and a half later, Karma Khayat and Al Jadeed TV were indicted and prosecuted for "undermining the confidence of the public in the ability of the tribunal to protect confidential information related to the witnesses or alleged witnesses" and to have disobeyed the order given by the Judge to stop broadcasting the reportage. They appeared in the court first in May 2014 for the pre-trial. The trial began on April 16, 2015, in The Hague. Karma Khayat could have been sentenced up to 7 years in jail and fined €100,000 if found guilty. Moreover, despite the tribunal's contradictions, this is the first time an organisation is prosecuted by an international tribunal which could make a precedent.

Special Tribunal for Lebanon acquitted the station and Khayat of all charges on 18 September 2015.

== Programming ==
=== Talk shows ===
- Kawālīs al-Madīna
- ’Ūl Nshālla

=== Soap operas ===
- Gümüş

=== Political Satire ===
- Douma Qrattiyeh (دمى قراطي)

== See also ==
- List of journalists killed during the Syrian civil war
