= Palace of Justice (Beirut) =

Coordinates: 33.8781°N 35.5193°E

The Justice Palace of Beirut, known as Palais de Justice (French), (Arabic: قصر العدل في بيروت) is the main judicial complex in Lebanon. Located in Beirut, it serves as the headquarters for Lebanon's judiciary system.

== Overview ==
The Justice Palace houses courts and offices for the judiciary, including civil, criminal, and administrative cases. It is situated in the Adlieh area of Beirut, near major roads for accessibility.

The courthouse hosts the Court of Cassation and its archives. The court's Plenary Assembly arbitrates between personal-status courts, including disputes concerning religious conversions. The courthouse archives also hold records of the Judicial Council, whose jurisdiction includes crimes against state security, political assasinations and terrorism.

Anthropologist Maya Mikdashi describes the Plenary Assembly's case files as containing material from lower courts. This includes lawyer's submissions, multiple testimonies, medical records and copies of evidence, alongside the Assembly Judge's notes and decisions. During her research, files were stored in multiple locations within the courthouse. By 2020, older Cassation Court Cases had been brought together in an archive with filling cabinets arranged by year.

== Architecture ==
The building was built by the architect Farid Trad. Construction took place between 1959 and 1963. The Justice Palace of Beirut is located on a property with an area of 35,000 square meters. It is an imposing building reflecting governmental and judicial authority. Its design combines modern and traditional elements to symbolize justice and resilience.

== Civil war and Archive destruction ==
During the Lebanese Civil War, the courthouse and the Ministry of Justice was situated along the Green Line separating East and West Beirut. In an interview with Mikdashi, a court clerk described employees sheltering from the bombings in the parking garage and relocating their desks and files to a hall after the archives where burnt and therefore destroyed. Judicial proceedings nontheless continued during the war.

Importantly, the 1985 shelling which destroyed archives and the ledgers used to index them created significant consequences for subsequent ongoing litigations. Especially when parties needed to establish the contents and authority of decisions whose official records had been lost.

Mikdashi records a case brought before the Planery Assembly in 1992 by siblings whose father had won a dispute concerning land occupied by a beach resort. The favorable decision dated from 1985, but its case file burnt during the fire. This left the siblings seeking recognition of a surviving personal photocopy of the judgment. When the cousin claimed shares in the property, authorities had to examine handwriting, question archivists and drew on their personal recollection of the original proceedings in order to establish the copy's authenticity.

== Notable cases ==
The Justice Palace has been the site of numerous significant trials, including cases related to political assassinations, corruption, and national security.
