= Syrian occupation of Lebanon =

1976–2005 military occupation

Syria occupation of Lebanon
- Part of the Syrian intervention in the Lebanese Civil War
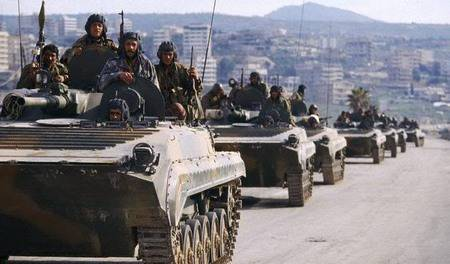
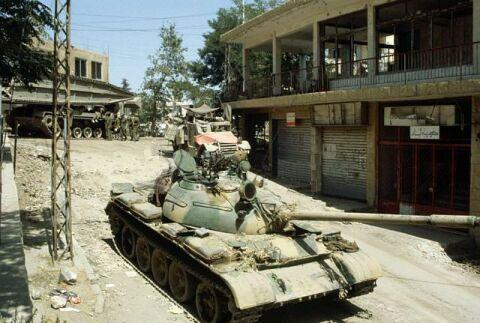
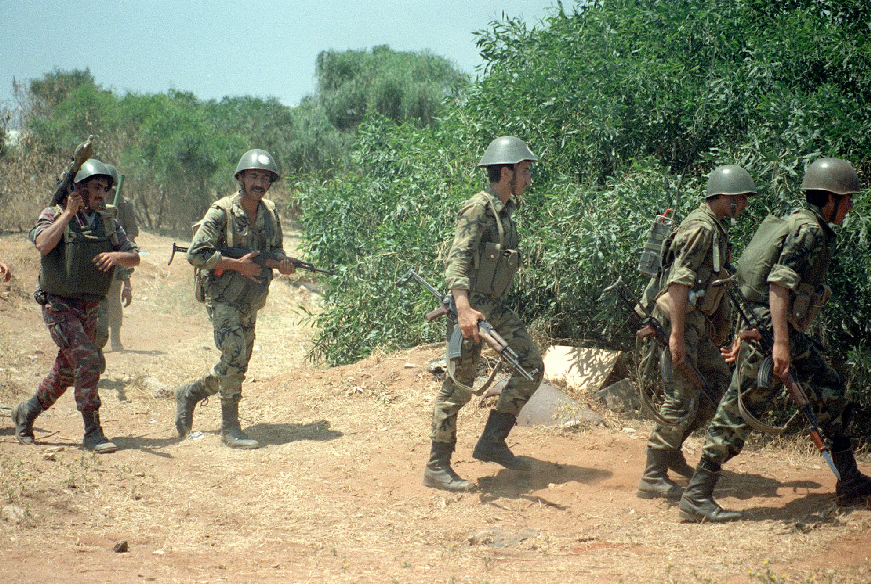
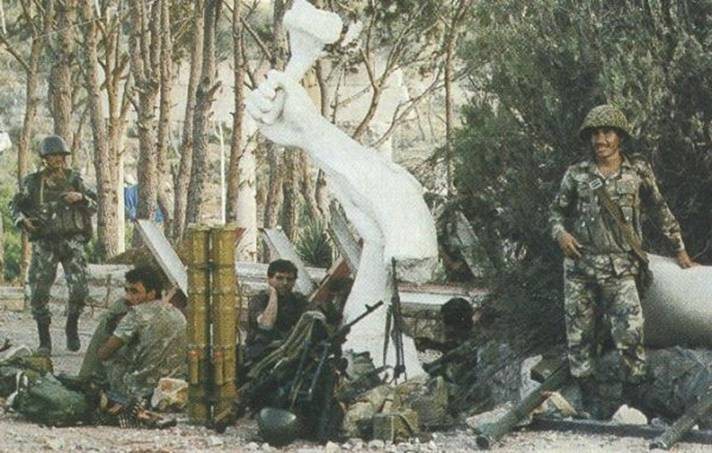
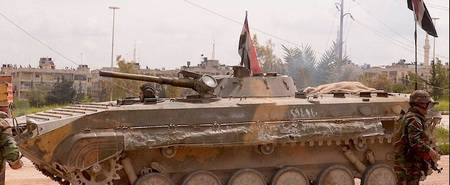
- Clockwise from top-left: Column of Syrian armoured vehicles entering Lebanon; Column of tanks and armoured personnel carriers in Beirut; Syrian soldiers in Beqaa Valley, 1986; BMP-1 armoured vehicle in Lebanon; Syrian commandos in Lebanon, 1982
- Type: Military occupation
- Location: Lebanon
- Commanded by: (Ba'athist Syria) Hafez al-Assad (1976–2000) (Ba'athist Syria) Bashar al-Assad (2000–2005)
- Date: 31 May 1976 – 30 April 2005 (28 years, 10 months, 4 weeks and 2 days)
- Executed by: Ba'athist Syria
- Outcome: Syria occupies northern and eastern Lebanon; Syrian Army withdraws from Lebanon on 30 April 2005 under the orders of Syrian president Bashar al-Assad
- Casualties: unknown number of Lebanese civilians directly killed by Ba'athist Syria: More than 643 Lebanese civilians forcibly disappeared.

The Syrian occupation of Lebanon lasted from 31 May 1976, beginning with the Syrian intervention in the Lebanese Civil War, until 30 April 2005. This period saw significant Syrian military and political influence over Lebanon, impacting its governance, economy, and society. The Syrian occupation of Lebanon led to an unknown number of deaths, and more than 643 forced disappearances of Lebanese civilians at the hands of the Syrian Arab Army and its "Moukhabarat", a local term for Syria's intelligence agency.

During the Syrian occupation, Lebanese human-rights organizations documented cases of arbitrary detention and enforced disappearance. The Lebanese Center for Human Rights reported that 17,415 people were officially recorded as missing during the Lebanese Civil War, with responsibility for disappearances attributed to multiple parties to the conflict, including Syrian forces.

The occupation ended following intense international pressure and widespread protests after the assassination of former Lebanese Prime Minister Rafic Hariri. The legacy of the occupation continues to influence Lebanese-Syrian relations and Lebanon's internal political dynamics.

== Summary ==
In January 1976, Syria proposed restoring the pre-civil war limits on the Palestinian guerrilla presence in Lebanon. This proposal was welcomed by Maronites but rejected by the Palestinian guerrillas. By October 1976, during an Arab League meeting, Syria agreed to a ceasefire, and the League decided to expand a small Arab peacekeeping force into a larger Arab Deterrent Force, primarily composed of Syrian troops, thereby legitimizing Syrian intervention with financial support from the Arab League. Throughout the occupation, the Assad regime promoted the idea of "Greater Syria," taking steps to integrate Lebanon into Syria.

At the end of the civil war in 1989, Lebanon was divided between two rival administrations: a military one led by Michel Aoun in East Beirut and a civilian one under Selim el-Hoss in West Beirut, supported by Syria. Aoun opposed the Syrian presence, referencing the 1982 UN Security Council Resolution 520. The "War of Liberation" broke out in March 1989, resulting in Aoun's defeat and exile. In 1991, Lebanon and Syria signed the Treaty of "Brotherhood, Cooperation, and Coordination," legitimizing Syria's military presence and assigning Syria the responsibility of protecting Lebanon from external threats. Later that year, a Defense and Security Pact was enacted between the two countries.

Following the adoption of UN Security Council Resolution 1559 and the assassination of former Lebanese Prime Minister Rafic Hariri in 2005, allegedly involving Syria, a public uprising known as the Cedar Revolution occurred. Syria completed its withdrawal from Lebanon on April 30, 2005. On August 18, 2020, a UN-backed special tribunal found a Hezbollah member guilty of Hariri's assassination, but found no direct evidence of Syrian involvement.

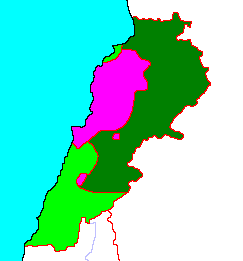
A map showing the power balance in Lebanon, 1976: Controlled by Syria Controlled by Maronite militias Controlled by Palestinian militias

== Background ==
The Syrian military presence in Lebanon was established during the Lebanese Civil War, which began on 13 April 1975.

The Middle East's geopolitical landscape was reshaped by the conflicts and wars of June 1967 and October 1973. Israel's resounding win in 1967, compounded by its occupation of the Sinai Peninsula, East Jerusalem and the West Bank, the Gaza Strip, and the Golan Heights, dealt a catastrophic blow to Egyptian President Gamal Abdel Nasser and the pan-Arabist ideology. The 1973 War was accompanied by superpower tensions and direct American involvement in the conflict resolution.

Since the start of the conflict between the Arab states and the State of Israel, Lebanon found itself squeezed between Israel and Syria, Lebanon's combative larger neighbours. Lebanon itself is touched by the different confessional adherences and by regional and global politics.

Lebanon entered a brutal and protracted civil war in 1975. Disputes erupted between mostly Christian Lebanese militias (known as the Lebanese Right) and Palestinian militias, as well as predominantly non-Christian Lebanese militias (commonly referred to as the Lebanese Left).

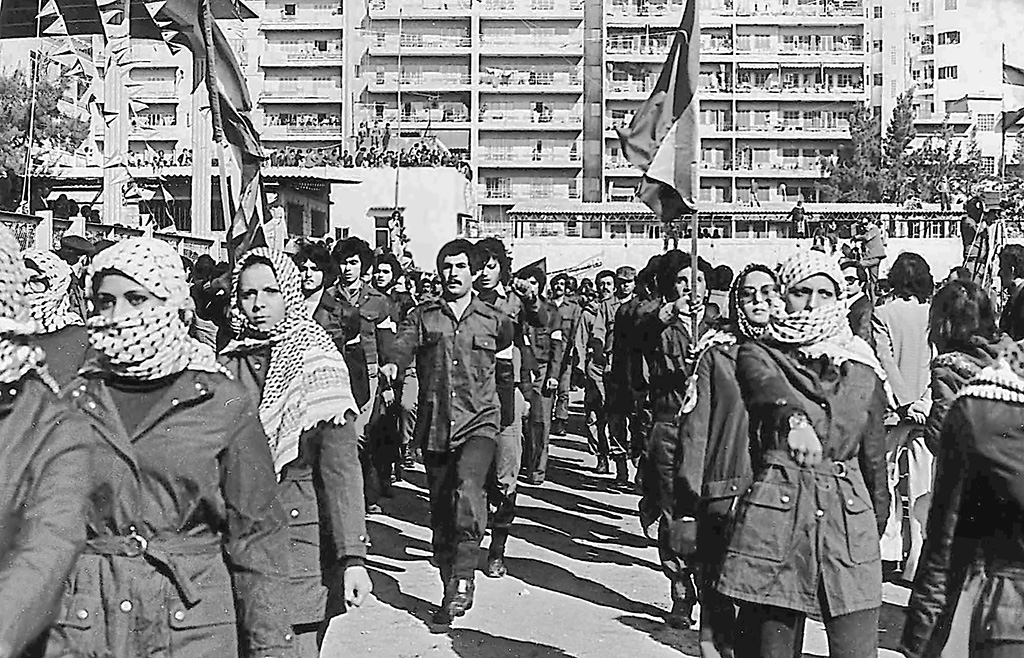
Palestinian guerrilla presence at a rally in Beirut, 1979

In January 1976, its proposal to restore the limits to the Palestinian guerrilla presence in Lebanon, that had been in place prior to the outbreak of the civil war, was welcomed by Maronites and conservative Muslims, but rejected by the Palestinian guerrillas and their Lebanese Druze-led and leftist allies. Syria's interventions came in response to appeals from Maronite leaders, who were under attack by leftists and Palestinians. After a confrontation with Lebanese Forces Leader Bachir Gemayel, the relationship between the Syrian forces and the Maronite leaderships deteriorated. In 1977, tensions turned into hostility, and turned into an open all-out conflict between the two parties.

Simultaneously, Syria was concerned about the weak military of Lebanon as it would be a danger in their fight with Israel. Recognizing that they were vulnerable to attacks, Syria moved from mediation to indirect intervention in supporting guerrilla groups to, finally, the deployment of Syrian troops in Lebanon.

== Syrian invasion of Lebanon ==
On May 31, 1976, the Syrian Army invaded Lebanon with 2,000 troops and 60 tanks in a three-pronged offensive. The first column marched south across Shuf towards Sidon, where it was halted by PLO forces. The second column moved west along the Beirut–Damascus axis, before being stopped at Beirut. Another column moved north through the Bekaa valley, before then going west towards Tripoli, where it was stopped by Christian forces. The offensive had been halted by 10 June due to massive casualties inflicted onto the Syrians. In Sidon, the PLO halted Syrian advance to the city outskirts of Ain Hilwe refugee camp and on the Beirut-Damascus highway, a combined LAA-PLO force inflicted enormous casualties in Bhamadoun on June 13. In his public speech on 20 July, Hafez al-Assad espoused the notion of a "Greater Syria", stating:

"Syria and Lebanon were one state and one people... and have shared interests and a common history"

A second Syrian offensive in mid-October 1976 succeeded at capturing all of central Lebanon as well as some of the country's most important urban centres. The hostility between Syria and Israel made Lebanon the 'perfect' playground as it is strategically located as a buffer between the north of Israel and Western Syria. Given Syria's proximity and historical ties with Lebanon as part of what was known as "Greater Syria", Syria has always been interested in domestic Lebanese politics.

Syrian involvement in the fighting between various Lebanese militias that erupted around the first of the year had previously been limited to tactical actions carried out by portions of the Palestine Liberation Army under Damascus' supervision. Around 4 April, these efforts were bolstered by a virtual blockade of Lebanon's ports by Syrian navy forces, ostensibly to prevent the fighting factions from receiving resupply of arms and ammunition. Syrian armed forces regular infantry and armored units arrived into Lebanese territory with force less than a week later.

== Occupation period ==
By October 1976, Syria had significantly weakened the leftists and their Palestinian allies, but at a meeting of the Arab League, it was forced to accept a ceasefire. The League ministers decided to expand an existing small Arab peacekeeping force in Lebanon. It grew to be a large deterrent force consisting almost entirely of Syrian troops. The Syrian military intervention was thus legitimized and received subsidies from the Arab League for its activities.

In the late 1980s, General Michel Aoun was appointed President of the Council of Ministers by President Amine Gemayel, a controversial move since Aoun was a Maronite Christian and the post was by unwritten convention reserved for a Sunni Muslim. Muslim ministers refused to serve in Aoun's government, which was not recognized by Syria. Two rival administrations were formed: a military one under Aoun in East Beirut and a civilian one under Selim el-Hoss based in West Beirut; the latter gained the support of the Syrians. Aoun opposed the Syrian presence in Lebanon, citing the 1982 UN Security Council Resolution 520.

Defending Syrian military presence by portraying Lebanon as an integral part of the Syrian nation and denying allegations of Soviet support, Hafez al-Assad stated to The New York Times in 1983:

"Lebanon and Syria are one single people, one single nation. We may be divided into two independent states, but that does not mean that we are two different nations... I would even argue that the feeling of kinship between Syria and Lebanon runs deeper than it does between states in the United States... Soviet Union is not in Lebanon and never was present there, neither before nor after the Israeli invasion. If the aim is to do away with the Syrian presence in Lebanon, Syria, as I told you, has been at home in Lebanon for centuries. Eight years ago, we answered the call of the President of the Lebanese republic and the heart-rending call of the Lebanese people."

The Syrian military remained in Lebanon; after a successful campaign against the Lebanese Forces militia who had controlled Beirut's port, Aoun, now with massive popular support in his East Beirut enclave, declared a "War of Liberation" against the Syrian forces.

Conflict with the Lebanese Army that was led by Michel Aoun began on 14 March 1989. Casualties among civilians on both sides from indiscriminate artillery bombardments across the front line were numerous. Aoun initially received a greater degree of international support than el-Hoss, but this ended abruptly with the American build-up for war with Iraq over Kuwait. Aoun had received considerable support from the Iraqi government, anxious to weaken the rival Baathist government in Damascus; on October 13, 1990 the Syrian forces attacked and occupied the Presidential Palace at Baabda.

Aoun took refuge in the French embassy and was later exiled from Lebanon to France. Circumstances surrounding his exile are controversial; his apprehension and exile are variously attributed to Syrian forces, Israel Defense Forces, Shiite militias, and the Lebanese Forces militia of Samir Geagea.

Since then, Syrian forces remained in Lebanon, exercising considerable influence. In 1991, a Treaty of "Brotherhood, Cooperation, and Coordination", signed between Lebanon and Syria, legitimized the Syrian military presence in Lebanon. It stipulated that Lebanon would not be made a threat to Syria's security and that Syria was responsible for protecting Lebanon from external threats. In September that same year a Defense and Security Pact was enacted between the two countries.

After the Israeli withdrawal from southern Lebanon and the death of Hafez al-Assad in 2000, the Syrian military presence faced criticism and resistance from the Lebanese population.

With the consequent adoption of UN Security Council Resolution 1559 and following the assassination of the Lebanese ex-premier Rafik Hariri and allegations of Syrian involvement in his death, a public uprising nicknamed the Cedar Revolution swept the country. On 5 March 2005, Syrian President Bashar al-Assad announced that Syrian forces would begin its withdrawal from Lebanon in his address to the Syrian parliament. Syria completed its full withdrawal from Lebanon on 30 April 2005.

== Foreign interference ==
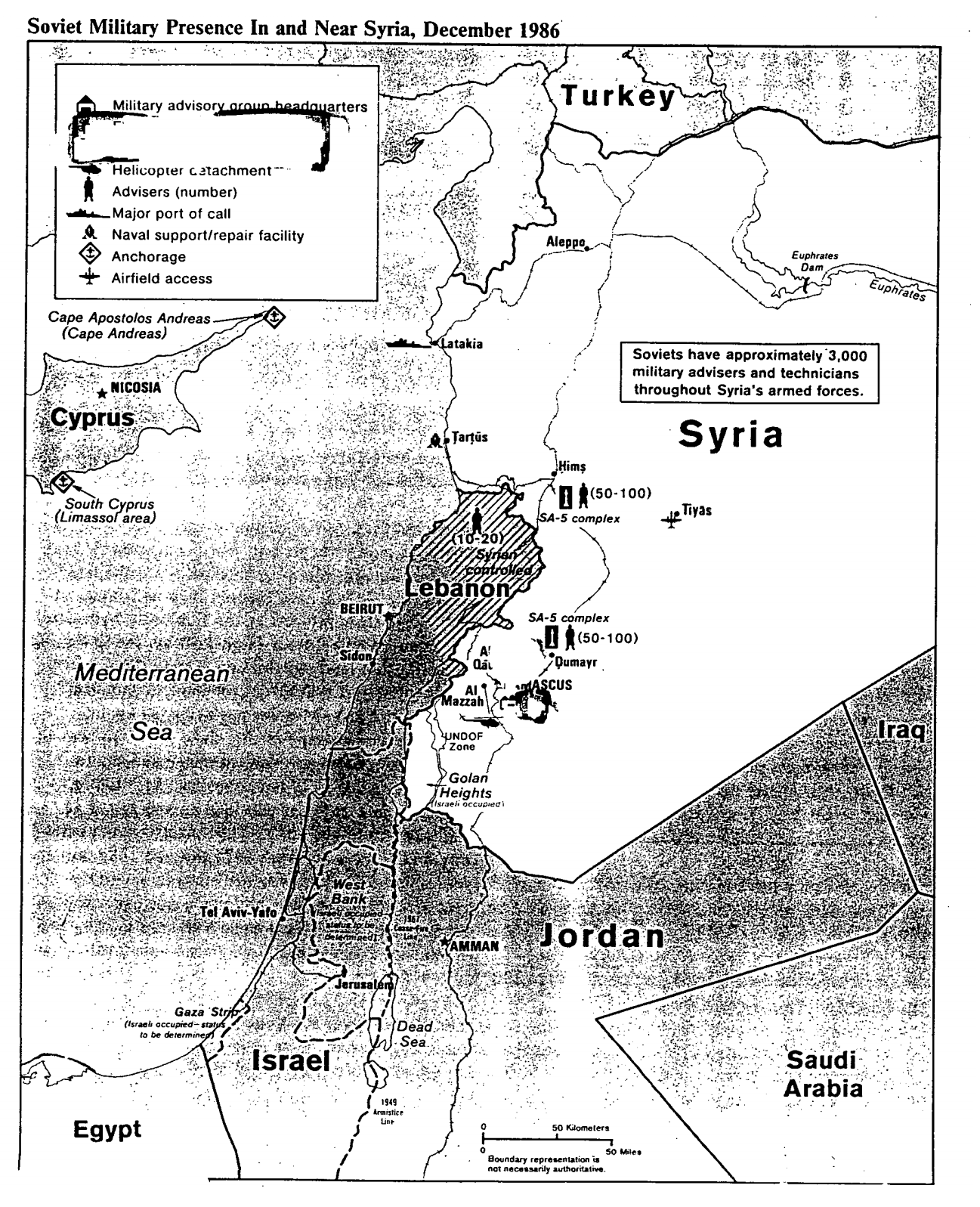
Soviet military presence in Syria and Lebanon, December 1986

The Syrian occupation was a proxy war because of two reasons, the first one by reason of the number and purposes of the militias that participated. Major militias were organized along Maronite, Druze, Shi'a and Sunni identities. Militias were organized rather on political identities than confessional ones. This meant that factions of the same confessional groups could battle each other. Amal and Hezbollah, even though both are Shi'a militias, fought brutal fights for control of the community.

Second, in the conflict, diverse foreign powers were involved as well as the militias they backed. Just about every major militia in Lebanon established a proxy relationship with a foreign state. Both Lebanon's neighbours, Syria and Israel, were among the top donors and sponsored militias from the beginning to the end of the conflict. After a few years, following the Israeli invasion of Lebanon in 1982 and a change in the dynamics of the Iran-Iraq war, Iran became actively committed in the conflict. Libya, Iraq and to a lesser extent, the United States and the Soviet Union, supplied backing to various militias. In the first half of the Lebanese Civil War, the PLO, Palestine Liberation Organization, was both a proxy and a benefactor, which was unusual in proxy warfare history.

=== Iran ===
The newly established Islamic Republic in Iran began supporting the impoverished Shi'a population in southern Lebanon in 1982. Iran had developed close ties with Syria, the only Arab state that supported it during its eight-year war with Saddam Hussein's Iraq. Iran's support for the Shi'a populations of southern Lebanon laid the foundation for what later became the social and military organization Hezbollah. Israel and Hezbollah have been fighting a low-intensity guerrilla war since 1985.

=== United States of America ===
The United States became involved in the conflict in 1976 when Israel let Syria know that it would consider foreign military forces in Lebanon as a threat to Israel's security, through the United States. The United States became aware of the situation which they could not ignore, because the left and the Palestinians had the upper-hand at that moment. The Soviet Union was already supporting the winning side. A Syrian intervention in the conflict appealed to the United States, so they set out to convince Israel to agree to a Syrian intervention in Lebanon and the Lebanese Christians to invite the Syrians.

Eventually the United States got Israel to agree to a Syrian intervention in Lebanon on certain conditions, Syria agreed to the conditions. This became the Red Line Agreement, which entailed three things: 1) Syria's army would not cross a certain line into South Lebanon, 2) Syria's army would not use surface-to-air missiles in Lebanon, 3) lastly, the Syrian army would not use its air force on Lebanese Christians.

=== Soviet Union ===
The Soviet Union played a notable role in the context of the Syrian occupation of Lebanon by supporting the Lebanese National Movement (LNM). This support aligned with the Soviet Union's broader Cold War strategy of backing socialist and nationalist movements across the Middle East.

In October 1980, the Soviet Union and Syria formalized their alliance through the signing of a twenty-year Treaty of Friendship and Cooperation. The agreement strengthened military, political, and economic ties between the two states and effectively signaled Soviet endorsement of Syria’s increasing involvement in Lebanon. Through this partnership, the Soviet Union provided Syria with military aid, training, and diplomatic support, thereby enhancing Syria’s capacity to sustain its presence and influence in Lebanon during the Lebanese Civil War.

== Assassinations ==
=== Kamal Jumblatt ===
On March 16, 1977, Kamal Jumblatt was assassinated in his car near Baakline in the Chouf mountains by unidentified gunmen. His bodyguard and driver also died in the attack.

Prime suspects include the pro-Syrian faction of the Lebanese Syrian Social Nationalist Party (SSNP), in collaboration with the Ba'ath Party. In June 2005, former secretary general of the Lebanese Communist Party George Hawi claimed in an interview with Al Jazeera, that Rifaat al-Assad, brother of Hafez al-Assad and uncle of Syria's former President Bashar al-Assad, had been behind the killing of Jumblatt.

=== Bachir Gemayel ===
On 14 September 1982, the Lebanese president Bachir Gemayel was addressing a speech in Achrafieh, at 4:10 pm, a bomb was detonated at the headquarters, killing him and 26 other politicians.

Habib Shartouni, a member of the Syrian Social Nationalist Party, was later arrested for the assassination. He was imprisoned for 8 years, until Syrian troops took over Lebanon at the end of the war and freed him on 13 October 1990. Eventually, then-president Amine Gemayel, the brother of Bachir, did not condemn Shartouni because of immense Syrian pressure.

== Units involved ==
Syrian forces entered Lebanon in 1976, one year after the Lebanese civil war began. Over the ensuing years, the Syrian military presence in Lebanon included up to 30,000 soldiers, although this number decreased over time as Syrian confidence in their intelligence and security control within Lebanon grew. The major formations in deployed in Lebanon were:

- 47th Armoured Brigade: Initially part of the 3rd Division and later associated with the 8th Division.
- 62nd Armoured Brigade: Originally a part of the 10th Division, often linked to the division's overall mechanised structure.
- 10th Mechanised Division which consisted of:
  - 76th and 91st Armoured Brigades: Integral components of this division, contributing to its mechanised and armoured capabilities.
  - 1 Mechanised Infantry Brigade: This division also included mechanised infantry elements to support armoured operations
  - 1 Artillery Brigade: Provided essential artillery support for the division’s operations.
- Special Forces Regiments: Several elite units and regiments were deployed strategically to support regular army operation
- 1 Air Defense Brigade: Ensured protection against aerial threats.

Before 1984, a brigade of the Defense Companies was also deployed in Beirut, Sidon and Tripoli to fight Sunni militias and train pro-Syrian militias. Officers of the Military Intelligence, General Security Directorate, and Air Force intelligence were tasked with Syria's administration in Lebanon. Ghazi Kanaan and Rustum Ghazaleh were the two intelligence officers who controlled Lebanon throughout this period.

== Crimes ==
=== Forced disappearances ===
Numerous crimes and atrocities were perpetrated by the Ba'athist Syrian military forces against the Lebanese population during the occupation period. Between 1976 and 2005, tens of thousands of Lebanese civilians were arbitrarily detained and forcibly disappeared in Ba'athist Syrian prison camps. The whereabouts of an estimated 30,000 of them remain unknown.

== Special Tribunal for Lebanon ==
The Special Tribunal for Lebanon (STL) was established by the United Nations Security Council resolution 1757 in 2007, in response to the assassination of former Lebanese Prime Minister Rafic Hariri and the deaths of 21 others in a bombing in downtown Beirut on February 14, 2005. The tribunal's mandate extended to other attacks linked to this event. Inaugurated in 2009, the STL operated independently, based in The Hague, Netherlands, and consisted of Lebanese and international judges. Despite using Lebanese law, it was not part of Lebanon’s judicial system nor a UN tribunal. Its creation was seen as essential due to the Lebanese judicial system's inability to handle such high-profile cases.

The tribunal’s notable achievements include the trial of Salim Jamil Ayyash, who received five concurrent life sentences in 2020. Hassan Habib Merhi and Hussein Hassan Oneissi were found guilty in 2022, reversing their previous acquittals. All three men remain at large. The STL faced numerous challenges, such as accusations of selective justice, inefficacy in enforcing arrests, and internal mismanagement. Despite substantial evidence, including testimonies from 297 witnesses and over 3,000 exhibits, the tribunal struggled with Lebanese non-cooperation and political resistance, particularly from Hezbollah, which hindered the tribunal’s effectiveness and credibility.

The tribunal’s 2,641-page judgment and various public documents aimed to provide transparency and accountability. Despite its mixed legacy, the STL was a significant step towards international criminal justice for terrorism. Its conclusion in 2023 marked an end to a complex legal and political chapter, leaving a significant, though contested, impact on the Lebanese and international legal landscape.

== Political status ==
Analyzing whether and when the Syrian presence was a military occupation under international law, Gerhard von Glahn writes that "The mandate of the Force was renewed several times before it officially expired on 27 July 1982, at the time of the Israeli siege of Beirut. The Lebanese government refused to request that the mandate be renewed by the Arab League. Instead, in September 1986, Lebanon requested an end to the Syrian presence in Lebanon. It would appear that lacking legal authority from both Lebanon and the Arab League, Syria's military forces had to be regarded henceforth as illegal occupants of Lebanon."

Comparing Syrian occupation of Lebanon with the Soviet occupations of Eastern Europe, Israeli professor of Middle Eastern studies Mordechai Nisan writes:

"Throughout the modern history of the Arab world, Nasser oppressed his Egyptian people, Saddam Hussein his Iraqi people, and Muammar Qaddafi his Libyan people. But Hafez al-Assad oppressed not only his Syrian people but the Lebanese people as well. Dictatorship was not an uncommon regime form, but a successful and long-term conquest was unusual. Egypt fought in Yemen (1963–67) and Iraq invaded Kuwait (1990), but only Syria occupied a fellow Arab country for thirty years... Stalinism in Eastern Europe and Assadism in Lebanon offer certain similarities for consideration. Military invasion, political manipulation, and ideological co-optation supplied the means for the Soviet Union to penetrate and dominate Eastern Europe; these were also methods employed by Syria against Lebanon. The common goal was the homogenization of thought and culture under centralized rule."

== See also ==
- List of extrajudicial killings and political violence in Lebanon
- Israeli occupation of Southern Lebanon
- Palestinian insurgency in South Lebanon
- Lebanon bombings and assassinations (2004–present)
- List of assassinated Lebanese politicians

== Bibliography ==
- Ginat, J.; Perkins, Edward Joseph; Corr, Edwin G. (2002). The Middle East peace process: vision versus reality (Illustrated ed.). University of Oklahoma Press. ISBN 9780806135229.
- Weisburd, Arthur Mark (1997). Use of force: the practice of states since World War II. Penn State Press. ISBN 9780271016801.
